= 2021 Liga DIMAYOR =

Liga BetPlay Dimayor
- Season: 2021
- Dates: 16 January – 22 December 2021
- Champions: Apertura: Deportes Tolima (3rd title); Finalización: Deportivo Cali (10th title)
- Relegated: Boyacá Chicó; Deportes Quindío; Atlético Huila
- Copa Libertadores: Deportes Tolima; Deportivo Cali; Millonarios; Atlético Nacional (via 2021 Copa Colombia)
- Copa Sudamericana: Junior; América de Cali; La Equidad; Independiente Medellín (via 2020 Copa Colombia)
- Matches: 411
- Goals: 928 (2.26 per match)
- Top goalscorer: Apertura: Three players (11 goals each); Finalización: Harold Preciado (13 goals)
- Biggest home win: Atlético Nacional 7–1 Patriotas (18 April)
- Biggest away win: A. Petrolera 0–5 Dep. Tolima (25 February); Atlético Huila 0–5 Deportivo Cali (1 November)
- Highest scoring: Atlético Nacional 7–1 Patriotas (18 April)

The 2021 Categoría Primera A season (officially known as the 2021 Liga BetPlay Dimayor season for sponsorship reasons) was the 74th season of the Categoría Primera A, Colombia's top-flight football league. The season began on 16 January and ended on 22 December 2021. América de Cali entered the season as defending champions having won back-to-back titles in the 2019 Finalización and 2020 tournaments.

The Torneo Apertura was won by Deportes Tolima, who claimed their third league title on 20 June after beating Millonarios by a 2–1 score in the second leg of the finals and a 3–2 score on aggregate, whilst the Torneo Finalización was won by Deportivo Cali, who beat the defending champions Deportes Tolima by a 3–2 aggregate score in the finals to claim their tenth league title.

== Format ==
The competition format for this season was approved by the General Assembly of DIMAYOR on 17 December 2020:

- Two tournaments with three stages each were played in the season. The Torneo Apertura was contested by 19 teams, while the Torneo Finalización was played by 20 teams.
- The first stage of both tournaments was contested on a single round-robin basis, with each team playing the other teams once for a total of 18 or 19 games. The additional match against a regional rival would not be played in this season. The top eight teams after the 19 rounds of each tournament qualified for the next stage.
- The second stage of each tournament had a knockout round contested by the top eight teams at the end of the first stage, with the top four teams being seeded for the quarter-finals and paired against a rival decided by draw. The quarter-finals were played under a format of double-legged series with the winners advancing to the semi-finals, which were also played over two legs.
- The finals in both tournaments were contested by the winners of each semi-final tie, playing a double-legged series for the championship.
- One team was relegated to Categoría Primera B at the end of the Torneo Apertura, being replaced in the Torneo Finalización by two teams promoted from the Primera B in order to return to 20 teams for the second half of the year. This was due to the decision of DIMAYOR's General Assembly to postpone relegation from the 2020 season to the end of the first semester of 2021, in order to ensure teams could be able to play the same number of matches as originally scheduled before the onset of the COVID-19 pandemic and the temporary suspension of the previous season. At the end of the Torneo Finalización and the season, two teams were relegated to the second tier.

On 12 July 2021, DIMAYOR announced changes to the format of the Torneo Finalización, including the extra match against a regional rival for a total of 20 first stage games and replacing the knockout stage for a semi-final stage in which the eight qualified teams were split into two groups of four where they will play each other team in their group twice. The group winners advanced to the double-legged final series.

== Teams ==
21 teams took part in the season, 19 of them returning from last season plus Atlético Huila and Deportes Quindío, who were promoted from the 2021 Primera B. Cúcuta Deportivo, who also competed in the top flight in 2020, did not take part in the competition this season as they entered liquidation, were forced to forfeit their final two games of the previous tournament, and were ultimately disaffiliated from DIMAYOR on 25 November 2020.

Locations of the 2021 Categoría Primera A teams

=== Stadia and locations ===
Team	Manager	City	Stadium	Capacity
Águilas Doradas	(Peru) Johan Fano (caretaker)	Rionegro	Alberto Grisales	14,000
Alianza Petrolera	(Colombia) Hubert Bodhert	Barrancabermeja	Daniel Villa Zapata	10,400
América de Cali	(Colombia) Juan Carlos Osorio	Cali	Pascual Guerrero	33,130
Atlético Bucaramanga	(Argentina) Néstor Craviotto	Bucaramanga	Alfonso López	28,000
Atlético Nacional	(Colombia) Alejandro Restrepo	Medellín	Atanasio Girardot	40,043
Boyacá Chicó	(Mexico) Mario García	Tunja	La Independencia	20,630
Deportes Tolima	(Colombia) Hernán Torres	Ibagué	Manuel Murillo Toro	28,100
Deportivo Cali	(Venezuela) Rafael Dudamel	Palmira	Deportivo Cali	44,000
Deportivo Pasto	(Colombia) Flabio Torres	Pasto	Departamental Libertad	20,665
Deportivo Pereira	(Colombia) Alexis Márquez	Pereira	Hernán Ramírez Villegas	30,297
Envigado	(Colombia) Alberto Suárez	Envigado	Polideportivo Sur	11,000
Independiente Medellín	(Uruguay) Julio Comesaña	Medellín	Atanasio Girardot	40,043
Jaguares	(Colombia) César Torres	Montería	Jaraguay	12,000
Junior	(Colombia) Arturo Reyes	Barranquilla	Metropolitano Roberto Meléndez	49,692
La Equidad	(Colombia) Alexis García	Bogotá	Metropolitano de Techo	8,000
Millonarios	(Colombia) Alberto Gamero	Bogotá	Nemesio Camacho El Campín	36,343
Once Caldas	(Colombia) Diego Corredor	Manizales	Palogrande	28,678
Patriotas	(Colombia) Juan David Niño	Tunja	La Independencia	20,630
Santa Fe	(Colombia) Grigori Méndez	Bogotá	Nemesio Camacho El Campín	36,343

The following two teams competed in the 2021 Finalización tournament, replacing Boyacá Chicó who were relegated to Primera B at the end of the Apertura tournament:

Team	Manager	City	Stadium	Capacity
Atlético Huila	(Colombia) Carlos Abella (caretaker)	Neiva	Guillermo Plazas Alcid	22,000
Deportes Quindío	(Argentina) Óscar Quintabani	Armenia	Centenario	20,716

=== Managerial changes ===
Team	Outgoing manager	Manner of departure	Date of vacancy	Position in table	Incoming manager	Date of appointment
Torneo Apertura
Atlético Nacional	(Colombia) Alejandro Restrepo	End of caretaker spell	28 November 2020	Pre-season	(Costa Rica) Alexandre Guimarães	30 November 2020
Alianza Petrolera	(Colombia) Dayron Montesino	End of caretaker spell	9 December 2020	Pre-season	(Colombia) Wilson Gutiérrez	23 November 2020
Independiente Medellín	(Colombia) Humberto Sierra	End of caretaker spell	10 December 2020	Pre-season	(Colombia) Hernán Darío Gómez	11 December 2020
Águilas Doradas	(Venezuela) Francesco Stifano	End of contract	12 December 2020	Pre-season	(Colombia) Hubert Bodhert	4 January 2021
Deportivo Pereira	(Colombia) Alexis Márquez	End of caretaker spell	22 December 2020	Pre-season	(Uruguay) Jorge Artigas	30 December 2020
Once Caldas	(Colombia) Hubert Bodhert	Resigned	1 January 2021	Pre-season	(Colombia) Eduardo Lara	3 January 2021
Boyacá Chicó	(Colombia) Belmer Aguilar	Sacked	14 January 2021	Pre-season	(Mexico) Mario García	14 January 2021
Atlético Bucaramanga	(Uruguay) Guillermo Sanguinetti	Mutual consent	15 February 2021	14th	(Colombia) Sergio Novoa (caretaker)	15 February 2021
Atlético Bucaramanga	(Colombia) Sergio Novoa	End of caretaker spell	23 February 2021	10th	(Colombia) Luis Fernando Suárez	23 February 2021
Alianza Petrolera	(Colombia) Wilson Gutiérrez	Mutual consent	26 February 2021	19th	(Colombia) Dayron Montesino (caretaker)	26 February 2021
Deportivo Pereira	(Uruguay) Jorge Artigas	Mutual consent	26 February 2021	18th	(Colombia) Alexis Márquez (Note: Originally as caretaker manager, appointed on a permanent basis on 22 April 2021.)	26 February 2021
Águilas Doradas	(Colombia) Hubert Bodhert	Resigned	2 March 2021	15th	(Venezuela) Francesco Stifano	3 March 2021
Alianza Petrolera	(Colombia) Dayron Montesino	End of caretaker spell	7 March 2021	19th	(Colombia) Hubert Bodhert	7 March 2021
Envigado	(Spain) José Arastey	Sacked	24 March 2021	13th	(Colombia) Andrés Orozco (caretaker)	25 March 2021
Deportivo Pasto	(Colombia) Diego Corredor	Sacked	9 April 2021	11th	(Colombia) Giovanny Ruiz (Note: Originally as caretaker manager, appointed on a permanent basis on 22 June 2021.)	9 April 2021
Envigado	(Colombia) Andrés Orozco	End of caretaker spell	16 April 2021	15th	(Colombia) Alberto Suárez	18 May 2021
Patriotas	(Spain) Abel Segovia	Sacked	27 April 2021	17th	(Colombia) Jhon Mario Ramírez	10 May 2021
América de Cali	(Argentina) Juan Cruz Real	Mutual consent	28 April 2021	8th, quarter-finals	(Colombia) Jersson González (caretaker)	28 April 2021
Jaguares	(Colombia) Alberto Suárez	Signed by Envigado	11 May 2021	10th	(Colombia) César Torres	25 May 2021
Atlético Nacional	(Costa Rica) Alexandre Guimarães	Mutual consent	5 June 2021	1st, quarter-finals	(Colombia) Alejandro Restrepo	9 June 2021
América de Cali	(Colombia) Jersson González	End of caretaker spell	16 June 2021	8th, quarter-finals	(Colombia) Juan Carlos Osorio	16 June 2021
Torneo Finalización
Atlético Bucaramanga	(Colombia) Luis Fernando Suárez	Signed by Costa Rica	21 June 2021	Pre-tournament	(Colombia) Óscar Upegui	8 July 2021
Patriotas	(Colombia) Jhon Mario Ramírez	Deceased	26 June 2021	Pre-tournament	(Colombia) Jorge Luis Bernal (Note: Originally appointed as caretaker manager due to John Mario Ramírez's health issues.)	22 June 2021
Deportivo Pasto	(Colombia) Giovanny Ruiz	Demoted	10 August 2021	20th	(Colombia) Flabio Torres	10 August 2021
Once Caldas	(Colombia) Eduardo Lara	Sacked	15 August 2021	15th	(Argentina) Fernando Dortti (caretaker)	15 August 2021
Atlético Huila	(Colombia) Dayron Pérez	Resigned	17 August 2021	19th	(Lebanon) Alberto Rujana	18 August 2021
Junior	(Colombia) Luis Amaranto Perea	Mutual consent	17 August 2021	12th	(Colombia) Arturo Reyes	17 August 2021
Patriotas	(Colombia) Jorge Luis Bernal	Change of role	17 August 2021	17th	(Colombia) Juan David Niño	17 August 2021
Santa Fe	(Colombia) Harold Rivera	Mutual consent	22 August 2021	17th	(Colombia) Grigori Méndez	22 August 2021
Once Caldas	(Argentina) Fernando Dortti	End of caretaker spell	27 August 2021	18th	(Colombia) Diego Corredor	26 August 2021
Atlético Bucaramanga	(Colombia) Óscar Upegui	Sacked	30 August 2021	5th	(Colombia) Sergio Novoa (caretaker)	1 September 2021
Deportivo Cali	(Uruguay) Alfredo Arias	Mutual consent	6 September 2021	13th	(Venezuela) Rafael Dudamel (Note: Ítalo Cervino was the caretaker manager for the 2021 Copa Colombia quarter-final first leg against América de Cali.)	8 September 2021
Independiente Medellín	(Colombia) Hernán Darío Gómez	Resigned	6 September 2021	14th	(Uruguay) Julio Comesaña (Note: David Montoya was the caretaker manager for the Torneo Finalización 9th round match against Jaguares.)	7 September 2021
Atlético Bucaramanga	(Colombia) Sergio Novoa	End of caretaker spell	13 September 2021	5th	(Argentina) Néstor Craviotto	13 September 2021
Atlético Huila	(Lebanon) Alberto Rujana	Resigned	25 October 2021	20th	(Colombia) Carlos Abella (Note: Caretaker manager until the end of the tournament.)	25 October 2021
Águilas Doradas	(Venezuela) Francesco Stifano	Sacked	16 November 2021	14th	(Peru) Johan Fano	16 November 2021

== Torneo Apertura ==
=== First stage ===
==== Standings ====
Pos	Team	Pld	W	D	L	GF	GA	GD	Pts	Qualification
1	Atlético Nacional	18	10	4	4	37	15	+22	34	Advance to the knockout stage
2	Santa Fe	18	9	6	3	25	14	+11	33	Advance to the knockout stage
3	Millonarios	18	10	3	5	25	18	+7	33	Advance to the knockout stage
4	Deportivo Cali	18	8	7	3	19	14	+5	31	Advance to the knockout stage
5	Deportes Tolima	18	8	6	4	22	14	+8	30	Advance to the knockout stage
6	La Equidad	18	8	6	4	21	18	+3	30	Advance to the knockout stage
7	Junior	18	8	5	5	21	13	+8	29	Advance to the knockout stage
8	América de Cali	18	7	8	3	19	12	+7	29	Advance to the knockout stage
9	Independiente Medellín	18	6	8	4	17	15	+2	26	
10	Jaguares	18	7	4	7	21	21	0	25	
11	Atlético Bucaramanga	18	6	6	6	20	16	+4	24	
12	Deportivo Pasto	18	4	11	3	19	20	−1	23	
13	Boyacá Chicó	18	5	4	9	17	20	−3	19	
14	Deportivo Pereira	18	4	6	8	16	24	−8	18	
15	Once Caldas	18	3	8	7	20	23	−3	17	
16	Envigado	18	3	8	7	15	23	−8	17	
17	Patriotas	18	5	2	11	17	31	−14	17	
18	Águilas Doradas	18	2	8	8	13	24	−11	14	
19	Alianza Petrolera	18	0	6	12	10	39	−29	6	

Source: Dimayor, Soccerway
Rules for classification: 1) Points, 2) Goal difference, 3) Goals for, 4) Away goals for, 5) Away goals against, 6) Effective time of play, 7) Drawing of lots.

==== Results ====
Home \ Away	AGU	APE	AME	BUC	NAC	BOY	TOL	CAL	PAS	PER	ENV	DIM	JAG	JUN	EQU	MIL	ONC	PAT	SFE
Águilas Doradas	—	—	—	—	1–1	0–3 (Note: Match ended after 79 minutes of play due to the withdrawal of Águilas Doradas player Giovanny Martínez by injury, leaving the team below the minimum number of players required per tournament regulations (seven). The score at the time of suspension was 0–3.)	—	—	1–1	—	1–1	0–2	—	—	1–2	0–0	2–2	—	0–2
Alianza Petrolera	1–2	—	0–2	1–3	—	—	0–5	—	—	2–2	1–1	—	—	—	—	0–2	0–0	—	0–3
América de Cali	1–1	—	—	0–0	—	—	2–0	—	—	1–0	0–0	1–2	—	—	0–1	2–1	—	—	0–0
Atlético Bucaramanga	4–1	—	—	—	3–2	2–0	—	1–0	—	2–0	—	0–1	—	—	0–0	—	1–1	0–1	—
Atlético Nacional	—	5–0	2–2	—	—	2–0	—	—	—	5–2	3–0	—	3–1	1–0	—	—	—	7–1	2–0
Boyacá Chicó	—	2–0	1–2	—	—	—	2–1	0–1	0–0	—	3–0	—	0–0	2–1	—	0–1	—	—	—
Deportes Tolima	1–0	—	—	0–0	2–1	—	—	—	—	—	—	2–1	3–2	0–1	1–0	—	1–1	3–1	—
Deportivo Cali	1–0	1–1	0–2	—	1–0	—	0–0	—	1–1	—	1–1	—	1–0	—	—	—	—	—	1–1
Deportivo Pasto	—	1–0	1–1	1–1	0–0	—	0–1	—	—	—	—	—	2–2	0–0	2–2	—	—	1–0	—
Deportivo Pereira	0–0	—	—	—	—	0–0	0–0	0–1	4–2	—	—	1–0	—	—	0–0	—	2–0	1–2	—
Envigado	—	—	—	1–0	—	—	0–0	—	0–1	0–1	—	1–1	1–1	2–2	—	—	—	3–0	2–1
Independiente Medellín	—	2–2	—	—	0–0	1–0	—	1–1	2–2	—	—	—	1–0	—	1–1	0–0	—	2–1	—
Jaguares	0–2	2–0	0–0	2–1	—	—	—	—	—	2–0	—	—	—	0–2	2–1	—	—	3–2	0–1
Junior	0–0	2–0	2–1	1–1	—	—	—	1–2	—	3–0	—	1–0	—	—	—	2–0	—	—	1–1
La Equidad	—	1–1	—	—	1–0	2–1	—	2–5	—	—	3–1	—	—	1–0	—	1–0	0–0	—	1–2
Millonarios	—	—	—	2–1	1–2	—	0–0	3–1	3–1	3–2	1–0	—	0–2	—	—	—	4–3	—	—
Once Caldas	—	—	1–1	—	0–1	4–2	—	0–0	0–1	—	3–1	2–0	1–2	1–2	—	—	—	—	—
Patriotas	2–1	3–1	0–1	—	—	1–1	—	0–1	—	—	—	—	—	1–0	1–2	0–2	1–1	—	—
Santa Fe	—	—	—	2–0	—	2–0	3–2	—	2–2	1–1	—	0–0	—	—	—	1–2	2–0	1–0	—

Source: Dimayor, Soccerway
Legend: Blue = home team win; Yellow = draw; Red = away team win.

=== Knockout stage ===
==== Bracket ====
Quarter-finals
Deportes Tolima	3	0	3
4	Deportivo Cali	0	2	2
La Equidad	1	2	3
1	Atlético Nacional	0	2	2
Junior	3	0	3
2	Santa Fe	1	0	1
América de Cali	1	0	1
3	Millonarios	2	0	2

Semi-finals
Deportes Tolima	1	2	3
La Equidad	1	1	2
Junior	3	0	3
Millonarios	2	2	4

Finals
Deportes Tolima	1	2	3
Millonarios	1	1	2

==== Quarter-finals ====
Team 1	Agg.	Team 2	1st leg	2nd leg
La Equidad	3–2	Atlético Nacional	1–0	2–2
Junior	3–1	Santa Fe	3–1	0–0
América de Cali	1–2	Millonarios	1–2	0–0
Deportes Tolima	3–2	Deportivo Cali	3–0	0–2

===== First leg =====
24 April 2021	América de Cali	1–2	Millonarios	Cali
15:30	Cabrera 53'	Report	Uribe 13'; Arango 80'	Stadium: Pascual Guerrero; Attendance: 0 Referee: Carlos Ortega

25 April 2021	Junior	3–1	Santa Fe	Barranquilla
15:30	González 30'; Borja 48', 54'	Report	Palacios 56'	Stadium: Metropolitano Roberto Meléndez; Attendance: 0 Referee: Wilmar Roldán

25 April 2021	Deportes Tolima	3–0	Deportivo Cali	Ibagué
17:40	Estupiñán 39'; Albornoz 84'; Campaz 87'	Report		Stadium: Manuel Murillo Toro; Attendance: 0 Referee: Jorge Tabares

25 April 2021	La Equidad	1–0	Atlético Nacional	Bogotá
20:00	Zapata 66'	Report		Stadium: Metropolitano de Techo; Attendance: 0 Referee: John Hinestroza

===== Second leg =====
1 May 2021	Millonarios	0–0 (2–1 agg.)	América de Cali	Ibagué
18:00		Report		Stadium: Manuel Murillo Toro; Attendance: 0 Referee: Wilmar Roldán

2 May 2021	Santa Fe	0–0 (1–3 agg.)	Junior	Armenia
13:00		Report		Stadium: Centenario; Attendance: 0 Referee: Carlos Ortega

2 May 2021	Atlético Nacional	2–2 (2–3 agg.)	La Equidad	Medellín
15:30	Andrade 64'; Perlaza 68'	Report	Mahecha 56'; Herazo 78' (pen.)	Stadium: Atanasio Girardot; Attendance: 0 Referee: Carlos Betancur

4 June 2021	Deportivo Cali	2–0 (2–3 agg.)	Deportes Tolima	Valledupar
15:30	G. Rodríguez 22' (pen.); Á. Rodríguez 33'	Report		Stadium: Armando Maestre Pavajeau; Attendance: 0 Referee: John Hinestroza
Note: Match originally scheduled for 1 May 2021, 20:00 local time but suspended due to public order disturbances in the Valle del Cauca Department.

==== Semi-finals ====
Team 1	Agg.	Team 2	1st leg	2nd leg
Deportes Tolima	3–2	La Equidad	1–1	2–1
Junior	3–4	Millonarios	3–2	0–2

===== First leg =====
10 June 2021	Junior	3–2	Millonarios	Barranquilla
16:00	Valencia 10', 39'; Sambueza 44'	Report	Uribe 19'; Arango 56'	Stadium: Metropolitano Roberto Meléndez; Attendance: 0 Referee: Carlos Betancur

10 June 2021	Deportes Tolima	1–1	La Equidad	Ibagué
18:05	Orozco 6'	Report	Mahecha 37'	Stadium: Manuel Murillo Toro; Attendance: 0 Referee: Carlos Ortega

===== Second leg =====
13 June 2021	Millonarios	2–0 (4–3 agg.)	Junior	Bogotá
13:30	Uribe 3' (pen.), 12'	Report		Stadium: El Campín; Attendance: 0 Referee: Jorge Tabares

14 June 2021	La Equidad	1–2 (2–3 agg.)	Deportes Tolima	Bogotá
19:00	Herazo 63' (pen.)	Report	Estupiñán 16'; Mosquera 51' (pen.)	Stadium: Metropolitano de Techo; Attendance: 0 Referee: John Hinestroza

==== Finals ====
17 June 2021
20:00 UTC−5

Deportes Tolima	1–1	Millonarios
Caicedo 36'	Report	Pereira 90+7' (pen.)

Estadio Manuel Murillo Toro, Ibagué
Attendance: 0
Referee: Carlos Betancur

20 June 2021
15:00 UTC−5

Millonarios	1–2	Deportes Tolima
Ruiz 23'	Report	Caicedo 61', 69'

Estadio El Campín, Bogotá
Attendance: 0
Referee: Carlos Ortega

Deportes Tolima won 3–2 on aggregate.

=== Top scorers ===
Rank	Name	Club	Goals
1	(Colombia) Jefferson Duque	Atlético Nacional	11
1	(Colombia) Diego Herazo	La Equidad	11
1	(Colombia) Fernando Uribe	Millonarios	11
4	(Colombia) Cristian Arango	Millonarios	9
5	(Colombia) Miguel Borja	Junior	8
6	(Argentina) Agustín Vuletich	Independiente Medellín	7
7	(Colombia) Jarlan Barrera	Atlético Nacional	6
7	(Colombia) David Lemos	Once Caldas	6
7	(Colombia) Brayan Moreno	Boyacá Chicó	6
7	(Colombia) Kelvin Osorio	Santa Fe	6
7	(Colombia) Pablo Rojas	Jaguares	6

Source: Soccerway

=== Relegation ===
A separate table is kept to determine the teams that are relegated to the Categoría Primera B for the next season. This table is elaborated from a sum of all first stage games played for the current season and the previous two seasons (six tournaments). For purposes of elaborating the table, promoted teams are given the same point and goal tallies as the team in the 18th position at the start of the season.

Due to the postponement of promotion and relegation from the previous season to the end of the first semester of 2021 and the disaffiliation of Cúcuta Deportivo, one team was relegated to Primera B at the end of the Torneo Apertura.

Pos	Team	2018 Pts	2019 Pts	2020 Pts	2021 Pts	Total Pld	Total GF	Total GA	Total GD	Total Pts	Relegation
1	Atlético Nacional	71	66	35	34	116	180	112	67	206	
2	Deportes Tolima	72	64	37	30	116	159	98	61	203	
3	Deportivo Cali	58	67	34	31	116	152	111	41	190	
4	Junior	62	63	33	29	116	139	90	49	187	
5	Millonarios	51	67	30	33	116	150	122	28	181	
6	América de Cali	47	67	33	29	116	146	131	15	176	
7	Santa Fe	56	46	40	33	116	145	99	46	175	
8	Independiente Medellín	69	59	20	26	116	162	135	27	174	
9	Once Caldas	63	56	29	17	116	140	121	19	165	
10	La Equidad	61	42	32	30	116	132	117	15	165	
11	Atlético Bucaramanga	58	46	21	24	116	123	135	–12	149	
12	Deportivo Pasto	35	54	34	23	116	115	118	–3	146	
13	Águilas Doradas	57	40	31	14	116	121	143	–22	142	
14	Envigado	46	47	23	17	116	121	143	–22	133	
15	Patriotas	49	50	17	16	116	100	147	–47	132	
16	Alianza Petrolera	42	55	19	6	116	112	166	–54	122	
17	Jaguares	39	38	17	25	116	102	164	–62	119	
18	Deportivo Pereira	39	38	18	18	116	93	161	–68	113	
19	Boyacá Chicó (R)	39	38	15	19	116	90	166	–76	111	Relegation to Categoría Primera B

Source: Dimayor
Rules for classification: 1st points; 2nd goal difference; 3rd goals scored; 4th away goals scored.

== Torneo Finalización ==
=== First stage ===
==== Standings ====
Pos	Team	Pld	W	D	L	GF	GA	GD	Pts	Qualification
1	Atlético Nacional	20	12	6	2	32	13	+19	42	Advance to the semi-finals
2	Millonarios	20	11	3	6	36	23	+13	36	Advance to the semi-finals
3	Deportes Tolima	20	9	9	2	25	13	+12	36	Advance to the semi-finals
4	Junior	20	8	9	3	25	21	+4	33	Advance to the semi-finals
5	Deportivo Pereira	20	9	6	5	24	21	+3	33	Advance to the semi-finals
6	Alianza Petrolera	20	8	7	5	27	18	+9	31	Advance to the semi-finals
7	Deportivo Cali	20	8	7	5	27	21	+6	31	Advance to the semi-finals
8	América de Cali	20	8	5	7	25	19	+6	29	Advance to the semi-finals
9	Envigado	20	7	6	7	24	23	+1	27	
10	Atlético Bucaramanga	20	7	6	7	26	29	−3	27	
11	Jaguares	20	7	6	7	23	26	−3	27	
12	Independiente Medellín	20	5	11	4	14	15	−1	26	
13	Águilas Doradas	20	7	4	9	24	25	−1	25	
14	Santa Fe	20	6	7	7	21	22	−1	25	
15	La Equidad	20	6	7	7	20	21	−1	25	
16	Deportes Quindío	20	6	4	10	18	24	−6	22	
17	Once Caldas	20	5	5	10	18	30	−12	20	
18	Patriotas	20	4	6	10	14	21	−7	18	
19	Deportivo Pasto	20	4	4	12	13	28	−15	16	
20	Atlético Huila	20	2	4	14	12	35	−23	10	

Source: Dimayor, Soccerway
Rules for classification: 1) Points, 2) Goal difference, 3) Goals for, 4) Away goals for, 5) Away goals against, 6) Effective time of play, 7) Drawing of lots.

==== Results ====
Home \ Away	AGU	APE	AME	BUC	HUI	NAC	QUI	TOL	CAL	PAS	PER	ENV	DIM	JAG	JUN	EQU	MIL	ONC	PAT	SFE
Águilas Doradas	—	1–0	1–3	3–0	—	—	—	1–1	1–2	—	0–1	1–1	—	1–2	1–2	—	—	—	1–0	—
Alianza Petrolera	—	—	—	2–0	1–0	1–3	—	—	2–3	2–0	—	—	3–0	1–1	1–1	1–0	—	—	3–0	—
América de Cali	—	1–1	—	—	1–0	0–2	0–1	—	1–1	3–0	—	—	—	2–3	3–1	—	—	1–0	0–0	—
Atlético Bucaramanga	—	1–2	2–1	—	1–1	—	—	1–1	—	2–1	—	2–1	—	0–1	1–1	—	3–4	—	—	4–3
Atlético Huila	0–2	—	—	—	—	1–4	0–0	1–2	0–5	—	0–2	—	3–1	—	—	1–1	—	—	2–2	1–2
Atlético Nacional	1–0	—	—	0–0	—	—	1–0	1–0	2–0	1–1	—	—	1–1	—	—	2–0	1–3	2–0	—	—
Deportes Quindío	2–1	1–0	—	2–3	—	—	—	—	—	1–2	2–3	—	1–0	2–0	—	—	—	2–1	0–3	1–1
Deportes Tolima	—	1–1	0–1	—	1–0	—	3–1	—	1–1	1–0	1–0	2–0	—	—	—	—	3–2	—	—	0–0
Deportivo Cali	—	—	0–1	1–2	—	—	1–0	—	—	—	2–1	—	0–0	—	1–1	2–2	2–2	0–0	2–0	—
Deportivo Pasto	0–2	—	—	—	1–0	—	1–0	—	2–0	—	1–2	0–2	1–1	—	—	—	1–3	0–1	—	0–1
Deportivo Pereira	—	0–2	1–5	1–1	—	3–2	—	—	—	—	—	0–1	—	0–0	1–1	—	1–0	3–0	—	1–1
Envigado	4–1	2–1	1–0	—	0–1	2–2	1–1	—	1–2	—	—	—	—	—	—	3–2	2–1	1–2	—	—
Independiente Medellín	1–1	—	2–0	1–0	—	0–0	—	2–2	—	—	0–0	0–0	—	—	0–0	—	—	3–1	—	0–0
Jaguares	—	—	—	—	2–0	0–0	—	0–3	1–0	4–1	—	1–1	0–1	—	1–1	—	4–3	1–1	—	—
Junior	—	—	—	—	3–0	1–3	0–0	0–0	—	2–1	—	1–0	—	2–1	—	1–0	—	4–2	1–0	—
La Equidad	2–2	—	2–1	1–0	—	—	1–0	1–1	—	0–0	1–1	—	0–0	1–0	—	—	—	—	1–3	—
Millonarios	1–0	1–1	0–0	—	3–1	—	2–1	—	—	—	—	—	2–0	—	4–1	0–1	—	—	1–0	0–1
Once Caldas	2–3	1–1	—	1–1	1–0	—	—	0–2	—	—	0–1	—	—	—	—	2–1	0–2	—	1–1	2–1
Patriotas	—	—	—	0–2	—	0–3	—	0–0	—	0–0	1–2	0–0	0–1	3–0	—	1–0	—	—	—	0–1
Santa Fe	0–1	1–1	1–1	—	—	0–1	—	—	1–2	—	—	3–1	—	3–1	1–1	0–2	0–2	—	—	—

Source: Dimayor, Soccerway
Legend: Blue = home team win; Yellow = draw; Red = away team win.

=== Semi-finals ===
The eight teams that advanced to the semi-finals were drawn into two groups of four teams, with the top two teams of the first stage being seeded in each group. The group winners advanced to the finals.

==== Group A ====
Pos	Team	Pld	W	D	L	GF	GA	GD	Pts	Qualification	CAL	JUN	NAC	PER
1	Deportivo Cali	6	4	1	1	11	6	+5	13	Advance to the Finals	—	2–0	3–1	2–1
2	Junior	6	1	4	1	9	8	+1	7		2–2	—	1–1	3–0
3	Atlético Nacional	6	1	3	2	10	9	+1	6		1–2	1–1	—	5–1
4	Deportivo Pereira	6	1	2	3	6	13	−7	5		1–0	2–2	1–1	—

Source: Dimayor, Soccerway
Legend: Blue = home team win; Yellow = draw; Red = away team win.
Rules for classification: 1) Points, 2) Goal difference, 3) Goals for, 4) Away goals for, 5) Away goals against, 6) Yellow cards, 7) Red cards, 8) Drawing of lots.

==== Group B ====
Pos	Team	Pld	W	D	L	GF	GA	GD	Pts	Qualification	TOL	MIL	AME	APE
1	Deportes Tolima	6	3	3	0	11	5	+6	12	Advance to the Finals	—	1–1	2–0	2–2
2	Millonarios	6	3	2	1	9	5	+4	11		1–1	—	2–1	3–0
3	América de Cali	6	2	0	4	6	9	−3	6		0–1	2–1	—	2–1
4	Alianza Petrolera	6	1	1	4	6	13	−7	4		1–4	0–1	2–1	—

Source: Dimayor, Soccerway
Legend: Blue = home team win; Yellow = draw; Red = away team win.
Rules for classification: 1) Points, 2) Goal difference, 3) Goals for, 4) Away goals for, 5) Away goals against, 6) Yellow cards, 7) Red cards, 8) Drawing of lots.

=== Finals ===
19 December 2021
18:00 UTC−5

Deportivo Cali	1–1	Deportes Tolima
Preciado 42'	Report	Ramírez 60'

Estadio Deportivo Cali, Palmira
Referee: Wilmar Roldán

22 December 2021
19:30 UTC−5

Deportes Tolima	1–2	Deportivo Cali
Quiñónes 14'	Report	Vásquez 59'; Preciado 75' (pen.)

Estadio Manuel Murillo Toro, Ibagué
Referee: Alexander Ospina

Deportivo Cali won 3–2 on aggregate.

=== Top scorers ===
Rank	Name	Club	Goals
1	(Colombia) Harold Preciado	Deportivo Cali	13
2	(Colombia) Fernando Uribe	Millonarios	12
3	(Colombia) Jefferson Duque	Atlético Nacional	10
4	(Colombia) Bayron Garcés	Alianza Petrolera	9
5	(Colombia) Juan Fernando Caicedo	Deportes Tolima	7
5	(Venezuela) Luis González	Junior	7
5	(Colombia) Adrián Ramos	América de Cali	7
8	(Colombia) Larry Angulo	América de Cali	6
8	(Colombia) Edwuin Cetré	Junior	6
8	(Colombia) Wilfrido de La Rosa	Deportivo Pereira	6
8	(Colombia) Teófilo Gutiérrez	Deportivo Cali	6
8	(Uruguay) Pablo Lima	La Equidad	6
8	(Colombia) Juan David Pérez	Once Caldas	6
8	(Paraguay) Gustavo Ramírez	Deportes Tolima	6
8	(Colombia) Andrés Rentería	Jaguares	6

Source: Soccerway

=== Relegation ===
The bottom two teams of the relegation table were relegated to Categoría Primera B for the 2022 season at the end of the Torneo Finalización, with this table taking into consideration the six most recent tournaments (2018–II, 2019–I, 2019–II, 2020, 2021–I and 2021–II). For purposes of elaborating the table, Atlético Huila and Deportes Quindío, who were promoted from Primera B at the end of the first half of the season, were given the same point and goal tallies as the team in the 18th position at the start of the Finalización tournament (Deportivo Pereira).

Pos	Team	2018–II Pts	2019 Pts	2020 Pts	2021 Pts	Total Pld	Total GF	Total GA	Total GD	Total Pts	Relegation
1	Atlético Nacional	30	66	35	76	117	189	115	74	207	
2	Deportes Tolima	39	64	37	66	117	162	97	65	206	
3	Deportivo Cali	29	67	34	62	117	153	115	38	192	
4	Millonarios	25	67	30	69	117	167	127	40	191	
5	Junior	32	63	33	62	117	145	95	50	190	
6	América de Cali	25	67	33	58	117	149	119	30	183	
7	Santa Fe	31	46	40	58	117	146	102	44	175	
8	Independiente Medellín	34	59	20	52	117	144	127	17	165	
9	La Equidad	36	42	32	55	117	133	122	11	165	
10	Once Caldas	36	56	29	37	117	132	125	7	158	
11	Atlético Bucaramanga	35	46	21	51	117	127	140	–13	153	
12	Deportivo Pasto	15	54	34	39	117	113	127	–14	142	
13	Águilas Doradas	32	40	31	39	117	127	146	–19	142	
14	Envigado	20	47	23	44	117	126	147	–21	134	
15	Alianza Petrolera	19	55	19	37	117	115	158	–43	127	
16	Patriotas	20	50	17	35	117	97	150	–53	122	
17	Jaguares	14	38	17	53	117	109	167	–58	121	
18	Deportivo Pereira	14	38	18	51	117	101	159	–58	121	
19	Deportes Quindío (R)	14	38	18	40	117	95	162	–67	110	Relegation to Categoría Primera B
20	Atlético Huila (R)	14	38	18	28	117	89	172	–83	98	Relegation to Categoría Primera B

Source: Dimayor
Rules for classification: 1st points; 2nd goal difference; 3rd goals scored; 4th away goals scored.

== Aggregate table ==
The aggregate table includes the results of teams in all stages in the Torneo Apertura and Torneo Finalización, and awards one berth to the Copa Libertadores and three berths to the Copa Sudamericana. As an exceptional measure for this season, and due to promotion and relegation being implemented halfway into the season, the two teams promoted for the Torneo Finalización (Atlético Huila and Deportes Quindío) entered with the same matches, points, and goals as the team in 19th place in this table at the end of the Apertura tournament (Alianza Petrolera).

Pos	Team	Pld	W	D	L	GF	GA	GD	Pts	Qualification
1	Deportes Tolima (C)	52	23	21	8	69	41	+28	90	Qualification for Copa Libertadores group stage
2	Millonarios	50	26	10	14	78	53	+25	88	Qualification for Copa Libertadores second stage (Note: Atlético Nacional qualified for the 2022 Copa Libertadores second stage by winning the 2021 Copa Colombia.)
3	Atlético Nacional	46	23	14	9	81	40	+41	83	Qualification for Copa Libertadores second stage
4	Deportivo Cali (C)	48	22	16	10	62	46	+16	82	Qualification for Copa Libertadores group stage
5	Junior	48	19	19	10	61	47	+14	76	Qualification for Copa Sudamericana first stage
6	América de Cali	46	17	14	15	51	42	+9	65	Qualification for Copa Sudamericana first stage
7	La Equidad	42	15	15	12	46	44	+2	60	Qualification for Copa Sudamericana first stage
8	Santa Fe	40	15	14	11	47	39	+8	59	
9	Deportivo Pereira	44	14	14	16	46	58	−12	56	
10	Independiente Medellín	38	11	19	8	31	30	+1	52	Qualification for Copa Sudamericana first stage (Note: Independiente Medellín qualified for the 2022 Copa Sudamericana first stage by winning the 2020 Copa Colombia.)
11	Jaguares	38	14	10	14	44	47	−3	52	
12	Atlético Bucaramanga	38	13	12	13	46	45	+1	51	
13	Envigado	38	10	14	14	39	46	−7	44	
14	Alianza Petrolera	44	9	14	21	43	70	−27	41	
15	Águilas Doradas	38	9	12	17	37	49	−12	39	
16	Deportivo Pasto	38	8	15	15	32	48	−16	39	
17	Once Caldas	38	8	13	17	38	53	−15	37	
18	Patriotas	38	9	8	21	31	52	−21	35	
19	Deportes Quindío	38	6	10	22	28	63	−35	28	
20	Boyacá Chicó	18	5	4	9	17	20	−3	19	
21	Atlético Huila	38	2	10	26	22	74	−52	16	

Source: Dimayor
Rules for classification: 1) Points, 2) Goal difference, 3) Goals for, 4) Away goals for, 5) Away goals against, 6) Effective time of play, 7) Drawing of lots.
(C) Champions

== See also ==
- 2021 Categoría Primera B season
- 2021 Copa Colombia
