= 2017 Categoría Primera A season =

Liga Águila
- Season: 2017
- Dates: 3 February – 17 December 2017
- Champions: Apertura: Atlético Nacional (16th title); Finalización: Millonarios (15th title)
- Relegated: Cortuluá; Tigres
- Copa Libertadores: Atlético Nacional; Millonarios; Santa Fe; Junior (cup winners)
- Copa Sudamericana: Independiente Medellín; América de Cali; Deportivo Cali; Jaguares
- Matches: 428
- Goals: 923 (2.16 per match)
- Top goalscorer: Apertura: Dayro Moreno (14 goals); Finalización: 4 players (11 goals each)
- Biggest home win: Deportivo Pasto 5–0 Patriotas (21 February)
- Biggest away win: Cortuluá 0–4 Deportivo Pasto (3 February); Alianza Petrolera 1–5 Atlético Nacional (11 March)
- Highest scoring: Independiente Medellín 4–3 Atlético Nacional (28 May); Deportivo Pasto 3–4 Deportivo Cali (13 August)

The 2017 Categoría Primera A season (officially known as the 2017 Liga Águila season for sponsorship reasons) was the 70th season of Colombia's top-flight football league. Santa Fe were the defending champions having won the title in the 2016 season's Finalización tournament. The season started on 3 February and concluded on 17 December.

In the Torneo Apertura, Atlético Nacional won its sixteenth title after beating Deportivo Cali in the finals, while in the Torneo Finalización Millonarios defeated crosstown rivals Santa Fe in the finals to win its fifteenth title.

== Format ==
The league was played under the same format used since the 2015 season. The Apertura and Finalización tournaments were divided into three stages: a First Stage which was contested on a single round-robin basis, with each team playing the other teams once and playing a regional rival once more for a total of 20 matches. The top eight teams after the twenty rounds advanced to a knockout round, where they were pitted into four ties to be played on a home-and-away basis, with the four winners advancing to the semifinals and the winner of each semifinal advancing to the final of the tournament, which was played on a home-and-away basis as well. The winner of the final in each tournament was declared the tournament champion and will participate in the 2018 Copa Libertadores, as well as the top team in the aggregate table not yet qualified and the Copa Colombia champions. The next four best teams in the aggregate table qualified for the 2018 Copa Sudamericana.

== Teams ==
20 teams took part, eighteen of them returning from last season plus América de Cali and Tigres, who were promoted from the 2016 Primera B. The former returned to the top tier after 5 years while the latter competed in the Primera A for the first time ever. Both promoted teams replaced Boyacá Chicó and Fortaleza who were relegated at the end of the last season.

=== Stadia and locations ===
Locations of the 2017 Categoría Primera A teams

Team	Manager	Home city	Stadium	Capacity
Alianza Petrolera	(Argentina) Juan Cruz Real	Barrancabermeja	Daniel Villa Zapata	10,400
América de Cali	(Uruguay) Jorge da Silva	Cali	Pascual Guerrero	33,130
Atlético Bucaramanga	(Colombia) Jaime de la Pava	Bucaramanga	Alfonso López^{a}	28,000
Atlético Huila	(Argentina) Néstor Craviotto	Neiva	Guillermo Plazas Alcid	22,000
Atlético Nacional	(Spain) Juan Manuel Lillo	Medellín	Atanasio Girardot	40,043
Cortuluá	(Colombia) Néstor Otero	Tuluá	Pascual Guerrero^{b}	33,130
Deportes Tolima	(Colombia) Alberto Gamero	Ibagué	Manuel Murillo Toro	28,100
Deportivo Cali	(Colombia) Sergio Angulo (caretaker)	Cali	Deportivo Cali^{c}	52,000
Deportivo Pasto	(Colombia) Flabio Torres	Pasto	Departamental Libertad	20,665
Envigado	(Colombia) Rubén Darío Bedoya	Envigado	Polideportivo Sur	11,000
Independiente Medellín	(Spain) Ismael Rescalvo (caretaker)	Medellín	Atanasio Girardot	40,043
Jaguares	(Colombia) Hubert Bodhert	Montería	Jaraguay	12,000
Junior	(Uruguay) Julio Comesaña	Barranquilla	Metropolitano Roberto Meléndez^{d}	49,692
La Equidad	(Colombia) Luis Fernando Suárez	Bogotá	Metropolitano de Techo^{e}	8,000
Millonarios	(Argentina) Miguel Ángel Russo	Bogotá	Nemesio Camacho El Campín	36,343
Once Caldas	(Colombia) Herney Duque (caretaker)	Manizales	Palogrande	28,678
Patriotas	(Colombia) Diego Corredor	Tunja	La Independencia	20,630
Rionegro Águilas	(Colombia) Diego Edison Umaña	Rionegro	Alberto Grisales	14,000
Santa Fe	(Uruguay) Gregorio Pérez	Bogotá	Nemesio Camacho El Campín	36,343
Tigres	(Colombia) John Jairo Bodmer	Bogotá	Metropolitano de Techo^{f}	8,000

a: Played its Torneo Apertura home games at Estadio Álvaro Gómez Hurtado in Floridablanca due to remodeling works at Estadio Alfonso López.
b: Temporarily plays its home games at Estadio Pascual Guerrero in Cali since Estadio Doce de Octubre failed to meet league requirements. Cortuluá used the Estadio Francisco Rivera Escobar in Palmira for its home game against Deportes Tolima.
c: Deportivo Cali used the Estadio Pascual Guerrero for its home games against Atlético Huila and Cortuluá.
d: Junior used the Estadio Jaime Morón León in Cartagena for its home games until late March due to works on the pitch at Estadio Metropolitano Roberto Meléndez.
e: La Equidad used the Estadio El Campín for its home games against América de Cali and Atlético Nacional.
f: Tigres used the Estadio El Campín for its home game against Atlético Nacional.

=== Managerial changes ===
Team	Outgoing manager	Manner of departure	Date of vacancy	Position in table	Incoming manager	Date of appointment
Torneo Apertura
Junior	(Colombia) Giovanni Hernández	Sacked	21 November 2016	Pre-season	(Colombia) Alberto Gamero	21 December 2016
Patriotas	(Colombia) Harold Rivera	Resigned	5 December 2016	Pre-season	(Colombia) Diego Corredor	14 December 2016
Independiente Medellín	(Colombia) Leonel Álvarez	Sacked	7 December 2016	Pre-season	(Argentina) Luis Zubeldía	14 December 2016
Atlético Huila	(Colombia) Virgilio Puerto	End of caretaker spell	12 December 2016	Pre-season	(Argentina) Jorge Vivaldo	12 December 2016
Deportivo Pasto	(Colombia) José Fernando Santa	Sacked	15 December 2016	Pre-season	(Colombia) Flabio Torres	18 December 2016
Atlético Bucaramanga	(Colombia) Flabio Torres	Sacked	16 December 2016	Pre-season	(Colombia) Harold Rivera	18 December 2016
Deportes Tolima	(Colombia) Alberto Gamero	Signed by Junior	18 December 2016	Pre-season	(Uruguay) Gregorio Pérez	23 December 2016
Millonarios	(Argentina) Diego Cocca	Resigned	21 December 2016	Pre-season	(Argentina) Miguel Ángel Russo	22 December 2016
Deportes Tolima	(Uruguay) Gregorio Pérez	Sacked	8 February	7th	(Argentina) Óscar Héctor Quintabani	10 February
Atlético Bucaramanga	(Colombia) Harold Rivera	Sacked	5 March	11th	(Colombia) Fernando Castro	9 March
Deportivo Cali	(Colombia) Mario Yepes	Resigned	9 March	9th	(Colombia) Héctor Cárdenas	13 March
Junior	(Colombia) Alberto Gamero	Sacked	26 March	19th	(Uruguay) Julio Comesaña	29 March
Rionegro Águilas	(Colombia) Néstor Otero	Resigned	17 April	18th	(Colombia) Óscar Pérez	4 May
Once Caldas	(Argentina) Hernán Lisi	Mutual consent	24 April	16th	(Colombia) Herney Duque	24 April
Atlético Huila	(Argentina) Jorge Vivaldo	Mutual consent	22 May	19th	(Colombia) Jorge Bermúdez	22 May
Cortuluá	(Colombia) Jaime de la Pava	End of contract	29 May	20th	(Colombia) Néstor Otero	30 May
Once Caldas	(Colombia) Herney Duque	End of caretaker spell	29 May	16th	(Colombia) Francisco Maturana	2 June
La Equidad	(Colombia) Arturo Boyacá	Sacked	1 June	13th	(Colombia) Luis Fernando Suárez	2 June
Deportes Tolima	(Argentina) Óscar Héctor Quintabani	Sacked	2 June	17th	(Colombia) José Eugenio Hernández	6 June
Atlético Huila	(Colombia) Jorge Bermúdez	End of caretaker spell	5 June	15th	(Argentina) Néstor Craviotto	6 June
Independiente Medellín	(Argentina) Luis Zubeldía	Resigned	6 June	2nd, Quarterfinals	(Colombia) Juan José Peláez	11 June
Santa Fe	(Argentina) Gustavo Costas	Resigned	9 June	9th	(Uruguay) Gregorio Pérez	14 June
Torneo Finalización
Atlético Nacional	(Colombia) Reinaldo Rueda	Resigned	20 June	Pre-season	(Spain) Juan Manuel Lillo	21 June
Atlético Bucaramanga	(Colombia) Fernando Castro	Resigned	30 July	19th	(Colombia) Jaime de la Pava	2 August
Envigado	(Spain) Ismael Rescalvo	Resigned	2 August	19th	(Colombia) Rubén Darío Bedoya	2 August
Rionegro Águilas	(Colombia) Óscar Pérez	Sacked	6 August	20th	(Colombia) Diego Edison Umaña	12 August
Deportes Tolima	(Colombia) José Eugenio Hernández	Sacked	22 August	11th	(Colombia) Alberto Gamero	22 August
América de Cali	(Colombia) Hernán Torres	Resigned	2 September	14th	(Uruguay) Jorge da Silva	4 September
Independiente Medellín	(Colombia) Juan José Peláez	Mutual consent	15 October	9th	(Spain) Ismael Rescalvo	16 October
Deportivo Cali	(Colombia) Héctor Cárdenas	Sacked	17 October	11th	(Colombia) Sergio Angulo	17 October
Alianza Petrolera	(Colombia) Jorge Luis Bernal	Sacked	22 October	20th	(Argentina) Juan Cruz Real	24 October
Once Caldas	(Colombia) Francisco Maturana	Sacked	14 November	18th	(Colombia) Herney Duque	14 November

== Torneo Apertura ==
=== First stage ===
The First stage began on 3 February and consisted of twenty rounds including a series of regional rivalries in the tenth round. It ended on 29 May with the top eight teams at the end of this stage advancing to the knockout phase.

==== Standings ====
Pos	Team	Pld	W	D	L	GF	GA	GD	Pts	Qualification
1	Atlético Nacional	20	15	4	1	33	9	+24	49	Advanced to the knockout phase
2	Independiente Medellín	20	13	3	4	35	23	+12	42	Advanced to the knockout phase
3	Deportivo Pasto	20	10	5	5	31	20	+11	35	Advanced to the knockout phase
4	Millonarios	20	10	3	7	29	17	+12	33	Advanced to the knockout phase
5	Jaguares	20	8	7	5	18	16	+2	31	Advanced to the knockout phase
6	Deportivo Cali	20	7	9	4	27	20	+7	30	Advanced to the knockout phase
7	América de Cali	20	8	5	7	26	21	+5	29	Advanced to the knockout phase
8	Atlético Bucaramanga	20	8	5	7	16	17	−1	29	Advanced to the knockout phase
9	Santa Fe	20	7	7	6	16	20	−4	28	
10	Alianza Petrolera	20	7	6	7	24	24	0	27	
11	Patriotas	20	5	9	6	17	18	−1	24	
12	Junior	20	6	5	9	25	26	−1	23	
13	La Equidad	20	5	8	7	15	18	−3	23	
14	Rionegro Águilas	20	4	9	7	14	21	−7	21	
15	Atlético Huila	20	6	3	11	16	25	−9	21	
16	Once Caldas	20	5	6	9	18	29	−11	21	
17	Deportes Tolima	20	5	5	10	24	28	−4	20	
18	Tigres	20	4	7	9	11	23	−12	19	
19	Envigado	20	4	6	10	18	26	−8	18	
20	Cortuluá	20	4	6	10	19	31	−12	18	

Source: Dimayor, Soccerway
Rules for classification: 1) Points, 2) Goal difference, 3) Goals for, 4) Away goals for, 5) Away goals against, 6) Drawing of lots

==== Results ====
Home \ Away	APE	AME	BUC	HUI	NAC	COR	TOL	CAL	PAS	ENV	DIM	JAG	JUN	EQU	MIL	ONC	PAT	RIO	SFE	TIG
Alianza Petrolera	—	3–3	1–2	0–1	1–5	1–2	2–1	—	—	—	1–2	—	—	2–0	2–0	—	1–0	—	—	—
América de Cali	—	—	—	—	0–0	—	—	3–0	1–0	2–0	—	0–2	3–1	—	—	4–2	—	0–0	0–1	2–0
Atlético Bucaramanga	2–0	1–0	—	—	0–1	—	2–1	1–1	1–0	1–1	—	—	—	1–0	—	1–2	—	—	—	0–1
Atlético Huila	—	2–0	0–1	—	0–1	2–3	1–0	—	0–1	2–0	2–1	—	—	0–2	—	—	1–1	—	—	—
Atlético Nacional	—	—	—	—	—	—	—	0–0	2–1	2–0	3–1	2–0	2–1	—	—	1–0	—	3–0	3–1	0–0
Cortuluá	—	0–1	0–0	—	0–1	—	2–2	—	0–4	1–3	2–2	—	—	2–1	—	1–1	0–0	—	—	—
Deportes Tolima	—	2–1	—	2–0	0–0	—	—	2–2	—	2–1	—	—	—	1–1	—	2–3	—	1–1	3–1	3–0
Deportivo Cali	2–2	2–1	—	4–0	—	2–0	—	—	0–0	—	—	1–1	3–1	—	1–1	—	—	3–0	0–0	—
Deportivo Pasto	1–0	—	—	—	—	2–2	1–0	—	—	—	—	0–0	1–2	1–1	2–1	—	5–0	2–2	3–1	—
Envigado	0–0	—	—	—	—	—	—	2–0	1–2	—	—	1–1	0–0	—	1–2	0–0	—	1–1	0–1	3–2
Independiente Medellín	—	2–2	0–1	—	4–3	—	3–2	3–1	4–1	2–1	—	—	—	1–1	—	1–0	—	—	—	3–0
Jaguares	0–2	—	1–1	0–0	—	2–1	1–0	—	—	—	0–1	—	—	0–2	1–0	—	1–1	—	—	2–1
Junior	1–2	—	3–1	3–3	—	2–1	1–0	—	—	—	2–0	1–2	—	—	1–1	3–0	0–0	—	—	—
La Equidad	—	0–3	—	—	0–2	—	—	0–1	—	1–0	—	—	1–0	—	—	2–0	0–0	2–2	0–0	0–0
Millonarios	—	3–0	3–0	2–0	0–1	2–1	3–0	—	—	—	1–2	—	—	1–0	—	—	2–0	—	3–0	—
Once Caldas	0–2	—	—	2–1	—	—	—	0–2	2–3	—	—	0–0	3–3	—	2–1	—	—	1–0	0–0	0–0
Patriotas	—	0–0	0–0	—	0–1	—	2–0	3–2	—	3–1	0–1	—	—	1–1	—	2–0	—	—	—	3–0
Rionegro Águilas	0–0	—	1–0	1–0	—	0–1	—	—	—	1–2	0–1	0–1	1–0	—	0–0	—	2–1	—	—	—
Santa Fe	1–1	—	1–0	1–0	—	2–0	—	—	—	—	0–1	0–2	1–0	—	2–1	—	0–0	2–2	—	—
Tigres	1–1	—	—	0–1	—	1–0	—	0–0	0–1	—	—	2–1	1–0	—	1–2	—	—	0–0	1–1	—

Source: Dimayor, Soccerway
Legend: Blue = home team win; Yellow = draw; Red = away team win.

=== Knockout phase bracket ===
Quarterfinals
1	Atlético Nacional	3	3	6
5	Jaguares	1	2	3
4	Millonarios	2	2	4
8	Atlético Bucaramanga	2	0	2
2	Independiente Medellín	1	3	4
6	Deportivo Cali	4	1	5
3	Deportivo Pasto	0	0	0
7	América de Cali	0	1	1

Semifinals
1	Atlético Nacional	0	1	1
4	Millonarios	0	0	0
6	Deportivo Cali	0	2	2
7	América de Cali	0	0	0

Finals
1	Atlético Nacional	0	5	5
6	Deportivo Cali	2	1	3

=== Quarterfinals ===
Team 1	Agg.	Team 2	1st leg	2nd leg
Jaguares	3–6	Atlético Nacional	1–3	2–3
Deportivo Cali	5–4	Independiente Medellín	4–1	1–3
América de Cali	1–0	Deportivo Pasto	0–0	1–0
Atlético Bucaramanga	2–4	Millonarios	2–2	0–2

==== First leg ====
31 May 2017	Jaguares	1–3	Atlético Nacional	Montería
15:15	Vanegas 66'	Report	Moreno 29'; Quiñones 53'; Torres 70'	Stadium: Estadio Jaraguay; Attendance: 4,500; Referee: Andrés Rojas

31 May 2017	América de Cali	0–0	Deportivo Pasto	Cali
18:00		Report		Stadium: Estadio Pascual Guerrero; Attendance: 0^{†} Referee: Hervin Otero

31 May 2017	Atlético Bucaramanga	2–2	Millonarios	Floridablanca
20:00	Mejía 68'; Palacios 88'	Report	Riascos 38'; Del Valle 90+2' (pen.)	Stadium: Estadio Álvaro Gómez Hurtado; Attendance: 10,000; Referee: Carlos Betancur

1 June 2017	Deportivo Cali	4–1	Independiente Medellín	Palmira
18:00	Sambueza 22' 51'; Orejuela 35'; Benedetti 54'	Report	Quintero 75' (pen.)	Stadium: Estadio Deportivo Cali; Attendance: 10,000; Referee: Mario Herrera

†: Match played behind closed doors.

==== Second leg ====
3 June 2017	Deportivo Pasto	0–1 (0–1 agg.)	América de Cali	Pasto
18:30		Report	Hernández 72'	Stadium: Estadio Departamental Libertad; Attendance: 13,500; Referee: Carlos Anaya

3 June 2017	Atlético Nacional	3–2 (6–3 agg.)	Jaguares	Medellín
20:15	Moreno 67', 90+3'; Rodríguez 74'	Report	Vanegas 16'; Steer 63'	Stadium: Estadio Atanasio Girardot; Attendance: 21,131; Referee: Gustavo Murillo

4 June 2017	Millonarios	2–0 (4–2 agg.)	Atlético Bucaramanga	Bogotá
17:30	Cadavid 45+1'; Riascos 45+4'	Report		Stadium: Estadio El Campín; Attendance: 20,981; Referee: Nicolás Gallo

4 June 2017	Independiente Medellín	3–1 (4–5 agg.)	Deportivo Cali	Medellín
19:30	Quintero 18' (pen.); Angulo 45+1' (o.g.); Arias 90+1'	Report	Benedetti 59'	Stadium: Estadio Atanasio Girardot; Attendance: 21,130; Referee: Wilson Lamouroux

=== Semifinals ===
Team 1	Agg.	Team 2	1st leg	2nd leg
Millonarios	0–1	Atlético Nacional	0–0	0–1
América de Cali	0–2	Deportivo Cali	0–0	0–2

==== First leg ====
7 June 2017	Millonarios	0–0	Atlético Nacional	Bogotá
19:05		Report		Stadium: Estadio El Campín; Attendance: 21,750; Referee: Mario Herrera

8 June 2017	América de Cali	0–0	Deportivo Cali	Cali
20:00		Report		Stadium: Estadio Pascual Guerrero; Attendance: 0^{†} Referee: Gustavo Murillo

†: Match played behind closed doors.

==== Second leg ====
11 June 2017	Deportivo Cali	2–0 (2–0 agg.)	América de Cali	Palmira
17:15	Benedetti 54'; Orejuela 70'	Report		Stadium: Estadio Deportivo Cali; Attendance: 20,000; Referee: Nicolás Gallo

11 June 2017	Atlético Nacional	1–0 (1–0 agg.)	Millonarios	Medellín
19:30	Moreno 90+1'	Report		Stadium: Estadio Atanasio Girardot; Attendance: 38,251; Referee: Luis Sánchez

=== Finals ===
14 June 2017
19:00 UTC−5

Deportivo Cali	2–0	Atlético Nacional
Mera 45'; Duque 65'	Report

Estadio Deportivo Cali, Palmira
Attendance: 22,868
Referee: Mario Herrera

18 June 2017
19:00 UTC−5

Atlético Nacional	5–1	Deportivo Cali
Torres 8'; Uribe 17'; Ibargüen 41'; Moreno 75' (pen.); Quiñones 78'	Report	Duque 20'

Estadio Atanasio Girardot, Medellín
Attendance: 44,189
Referee: Andrés Rojas

Atlético Nacional won 5–3 on aggregate.

=== Top goalscorers ===
Rank	Name	Club	Goals
1	(Colombia) Dayro Moreno	Atlético Nacional	14
2	(Colombia) Feiver Mercado	Cortuluá	11
2	(Colombia) Jefferson Duque	Deportivo Cali	11
4	(Colombia) César Arias	Alianza Petrolera	9
4	(Colombia) Santiago Tréllez	Deportivo Pasto	9
4	(Colombia) Cristian Martínez Borja	América de Cali	9

Source: Dimayor

== Torneo Finalización ==
=== First stage ===
The First stage began on 7 July and featured the same format used in the Torneo Apertura, with reversed fixtures. It concluded on 19 November with the top eight teams at the end of this stage advancing to the knockout stage.

==== Standings ====
Pos	Team	Pld	W	D	L	GF	GA	GD	Pts	Qualification
1	Junior	20	12	3	5	32	15	+17	39	Advance to the knockout phase
2	Santa Fe	20	11	6	3	21	10	+11	39	Advance to the knockout phase
3	Atlético Nacional	20	12	2	6	25	12	+13	38	Advance to the knockout phase
4	Millonarios	20	10	6	4	26	14	+12	36	Advance to the knockout phase
5	Deportes Tolima	20	9	6	5	25	20	+5	33	Advance to the knockout phase
6	América de Cali	20	8	7	5	19	15	+4	31	Advance to the knockout phase
7	La Equidad	20	7	9	4	25	18	+7	30	Advance to the knockout phase
8	Jaguares	20	7	7	6	25	21	+4	28	Advance to the knockout phase
9	Independiente Medellín	20	7	6	7	23	20	+3	27	
10	Atlético Huila	20	7	6	7	21	23	−2	27	
11	Envigado	20	7	5	8	19	23	−4	26	
12	Tigres	20	7	5	8	13	19	−6	26	
13	Cortuluá	20	7	3	10	17	28	−11	24	
14	Deportivo Cali	20	6	5	9	25	32	−7	23	
15	Deportivo Pasto	20	6	3	11	25	29	−4	21	
16	Patriotas	20	4	9	7	19	25	−6	21	
17	Once Caldas	20	5	6	9	16	24	−8	21	
18	Alianza Petrolera	20	5	4	11	16	28	−12	19	
19	Atlético Bucaramanga	20	4	6	10	18	23	−5	18	
20	Rionegro Águilas	20	4	6	10	16	26	−10	18	

Source: Dimayor, Soccerway
Rules for classification: 1) Points, 2) Goal difference, 3) Goals for, 4) Away goals for, 5) Away goals against, 6) Drawing of lots

==== Results ====
Home \ Away	APE	AME	BUC	HUI	NAC	COR	TOL	CAL	PAS	ENV	DIM	JAG	JUN	EQU	MIL	ONC	PAT	RIO	SFE	TIG
Alianza Petrolera	—	—	2–1	—	—	—	—	2–1	4–2	1–2	—	1–1	1–0	—	—	0–1	—	2–0	0–0	0–1
América de Cali	2–1	—	1–0	3–1	—	2–1	3–0	0–1	—	—	2–0	—	—	1–1	0–0	—	3–2	—	—	—
Atlético Bucaramanga	1–0	—	—	0–1	—	0–1	—	—	—	—	1–1	2–2	1–3	—	1–3	—	2–0	2–2	2–1	—
Atlético Huila	2–0	—	—	—	—	—	2–0	2–2	—	—	—	3–3	1–1	—	0–0	1–0	—	2–0	0–2	1–0
Atlético Nacional	4–0	2–0	2–1	1–0	—	3–0	1–0	—	—	—	0–0	—	—	1–1	3–2	—	3–0	—	—	—
Cortuluá	0–0	—	—	2–1	—	—	—	2–1	3–2	—	—	1–3	1–0	—	0–2	—	—	1–0	0–1	1–0
Deportes Tolima	3–0	—	1–0	1–0	—	2–0	—	—	3–0	—	2–1	0–0	2–2	—	1–1	—	2–1	—	—	—
Deportivo Cali	—	0–0	2–1	—	1–0	—	1–2	—	—	4–2	1–3	—	—	1–1	—	1–2	0–0	—	—	1–1
Deportivo Pasto	—	1–0	0–0	4–0	2–0	1–1	—	3–4	—	1–2	1–0	—	—	—	—	2–1	—	—	—	3–1
Envigado	—	2–1	0–0	1–2	0–2	2–0	3–1	—	—	—	0–2	—	—	2–1	—	—	0–0	2–0	—	—
Independiente Medellín	3–1	—	—	1–1	1–0	1–0	—	—	—	—	—	2–0	1–2	—	1–1	—	3–2	1–2	0–1	—
Jaguares	—	0–0	—	—	0–1	—	—	3–2	2–0	2–0	—	—	0–1	—	—	1–0	—	2–0	2–2	1–0
Junior	—	3–0	—	—	2–0	—	—	1–0	1–0	2–0	—	—	—	3–0	—	3–0	—	2–2	0–1	2–0
La Equidad	1–1	—	0–0	1–0	—	3–0	0–1	—	3–2	—	2–2	2–1	—	—	0–1	—	4–1	—	—	—
Millonarios	1–0	—	—	—	—	—	—	5–1	1–0	1–0	—	1–0	1–2	—	—	2–0	—	1–1	0–1	1–1
Once Caldas	—	0–0	0–2	—	0–1	2–1	2–1	—	—	1–1	0–0	—	3–2	0–0	—	—	0–0	—	—	—
Patriotas	2–0	—	—	1–1	—	2–2	—	—	0–0	—	—	2–2	1–0	1–1	1–2	—	—	1–0	0–0	—
Rionegro Águilas	—	0–1	—	—	0–1	—	1–1	0–1	2–1	0–0	—	—	—	0–1	—	2–2	—	—	2–1	2–1
Santa Fe	—	0–0	—	—	1–0	—	1–1	2–0	1–0	2–0	—	—	—	0–0	1–0	3–2	—	—	—	0–1
Tigres	—	0–0	2–1	—	1–0	—	1–1	—	—	0–0	1–0	1–0	—	0–3	—	1–0	0–2	—	—	—

Source: Dimayor, Soccerway
Legend: Blue = home team win; Yellow = draw; Red = away team win.

=== Knockout phase bracket ===
Quarterfinals
2	Santa Fe	0	4	4
8	Jaguares	0	1	1
3	Atlético Nacional	0	2	2 (1)
5	Deportes Tolima (p)	1	1	2 (3)
4	Millonarios	1	2	3
7	La Equidad	1	1	2
1	Junior	0	2	2 (2)
6	América de Cali (p)	0	2	2 (4)

Semifinals
2	Santa Fe	1	1	2
5	Deportes Tolima	0	1	1
4	Millonarios	2	0	2
6	América de Cali	1	0	1

Finals
2	Santa Fe	0	2	2
4	Millonarios	1	2	3

=== Quarterfinals ===
Team 1	Agg.	Team 2	1st leg	2nd leg
América de Cali	2–2 (4–2 p)	Junior	0–0	2–2
Jaguares	1–4	Santa Fe	0–0	1–4
Deportes Tolima	2–2 (3–1 p)	Atlético Nacional	1–0	1–2
La Equidad	2–3	Millonarios	1–1	1–2

==== First leg ====
25 November 2017	La Equidad	1–1	Millonarios	Bogotá
19:30	Blanco 53'	Report	Del Valle 43'	Stadium: Estadio Metropolitano de Techo; Attendance: 3,204; Referee: Gustavo Murillo

26 November 2017	Jaguares	0–0	Santa Fe	Montería
15:10		Report		Stadium: Estadio Jaraguay; Attendance: 6,000; Referee: Alexander Ospina

26 November 2017	Deportes Tolima	1–0	Atlético Nacional	Ibagué
17:05	Mosquera 73'	Report		Stadium: Estadio Manuel Murillo Toro; Attendance: 15,000; Referee: Luis Sánchez

27 November 2017	América de Cali	0–0	Junior	Cali
19:45		Report		Stadium: Estadio Pascual Guerrero; Attendance: 36,973; Referee: Andrés Rojas

==== Second leg ====
29 November 2017	Millonarios	2–1 (3–2 agg.)	La Equidad	Bogotá
19:45	Cadavid 16' (pen.); Silva 85'	Report	Valencia 77'	Stadium: Estadio El Campín; Attendance: 20,677; Referee: Nicolás Gallo

30 November 2017	Santa Fe	4–1 (4–1 agg.)	Jaguares	Bogotá
18:45	Urrego 14'; Morelo 54'; Valencia 83'; Pérez 86'	Report	López 65'	Stadium: Estadio El Campín; Attendance: 16,887; Referee: Gustavo Murillo

2 December 2017	Atlético Nacional	2–1 (2–2 agg.) (1–3 p)	Deportes Tolima	Medellín
19:45	Ruiz 46'; Moreno 51' (pen.)	Report	Pérez 56' (pen.)	Stadium: Estadio Atanasio Girardot; Attendance: 20,985; Referee: Bismark Santiago
	Penalties
	J. Mosquera (penalty missed); Bocanegra (penalty missed); Torres (penalty scored); Ruiz (penalty missed)		(penalty scored) S. Mosquera; (penalty scored) Lloreda; (penalty missed) Villa; (penalty scored) Rivas

3 December 2017	Junior	2–2 (2–2 agg.) (2–4 p)	América de Cali	Barranquilla
17:15	T. Gutiérrez 20'; G. Gutiérrez 38'	Report	Angulo 27'; Castañeda 88'	Stadium: Estadio Metropolitano Roberto Meléndez; Attendance: 26,631; Referee: Wilmar Roldán
	Penalties
	T. Gutiérrez (penalty scored); Sánchez (penalty scored); Mier (penalty missed); Chará (penalty missed)		(penalty scored) Lizarazo; (penalty missed) Angulo; (penalty scored) Arboleda; (penalty scored) Castañeda; (penalty scored) Martínez Borja

=== Semifinals ===
Team 1	Agg.	Team 2	1st leg	2nd leg
América de Cali	1–2	Millonarios	1–2	0–0
Deportes Tolima	1–2	Santa Fe	0–1	1–1

==== First leg ====
6 December 2017	Deportes Tolima	0–1	Santa Fe	Ibagué
20:00		Report	Morelo 56'	Stadium: Estadio Manuel Murillo Toro; Attendance: 22,000; Referee: Wilmar Roldán

7 December 2017	América de Cali	1–2	Millonarios	Cali
19:45	Martínez Borja 69' (pen.)	Report	Del Valle 33'; Silva 72'	Stadium: Estadio Pascual Guerrero; Attendance: 36,000; Referee: John Hinestroza

==== Second leg ====
9 December 2017	Santa Fe	1–1 (2–1 agg.)	Deportes Tolima	Bogotá
19:00	Roa 82'	Report	Correa 60'	Stadium: Estadio El Campín; Attendance: 34,139; Referee: Gustavo Murillo

10 December 2017	Millonarios	0–0 (2–1 agg.)	América de Cali	Bogotá
19:15		Report		Stadium: Estadio El Campín; Attendance: 33,084; Referee: Bismark Santiago

=== Finals ===
13 December 2017
19:30 UTC−5

Millonarios	1–0	Santa Fe
De Los Santos 32'	Report

Estadio El Campín, Bogotá
Attendance: 32,288
Referee: Luis Sánchez

17 December 2017
19:00 UTC−5

Santa Fe	2–2	Millonarios
Morelo 18' (pen.), 83'	Report	Cadavid 55'; Rojas 85'

Estadio El Campín, Bogotá
Attendance: 36,000
Referee: Wilmar Roldán

Millonarios won 3–2 on aggregate.

=== Top goalscorers ===
Rank	Name	Club	Goals
1	(Colombia) Yimmi Chará	Junior	11
1	(Colombia) Ayron del Valle	Millonarios	11
1	(Colombia) Dayro Moreno	Atlético Nacional	11
1	(Colombia) Carmelo Valencia	La Equidad	11
5	(Colombia) Ángelo Rodríguez	Deportes Tolima	9
6	(Colombia) Wilson Morelo	Santa Fe	8
6	(Colombia) Marco Pérez	Deportes Tolima	8
6	(Argentina) Agustín Vuletich	Rionegro Águilas	8
9	(Colombia) Teófilo Gutiérrez	Junior	7
9	(Colombia) Pablo Rojas	Jaguares	7

Source: Soccerway

== Aggregate table ==
Pos	Team	Pld	W	D	L	GF	GA	GD	Pts	Qualification
1	Atlético Nacional (C)	48	32	7	9	72	29	+43	103	Qualification to Copa Libertadores group stage
2	Millonarios (C)	50	24	14	12	67	39	+28	86	Qualification to Copa Libertadores group stage
3	Santa Fe	46	20	16	10	45	35	+10	76	Qualification to Copa Libertadores second stage
4	Independiente Medellín	42	21	9	12	62	48	+14	72	Qualification to Copa Sudamericana first stage
5	América de Cali	48	17	17	14	49	42	+7	68	Qualification to Copa Sudamericana first stage
6	Junior	42	18	10	14	59	43	+16	64	Qualification to Copa Libertadores second stage (Note: Junior qualified for the Copa Libertadores second stage by winning the 2017 Copa Colombia.)
7	Deportivo Cali	46	16	15	15	62	61	+1	63	Qualification to Copa Sudamericana first stage
8	Jaguares	44	15	15	14	47	47	0	60	Qualification to Copa Sudamericana first stage
9	Deportivo Pasto	42	16	9	17	56	50	+6	57	
10	Deportes Tolima	44	15	12	17	52	52	0	57	
11	La Equidad	42	12	18	12	42	39	+3	54	
12	Atlético Bucaramanga	42	12	12	18	36	45	−9	48	
13	Atlético Huila	40	13	9	18	37	48	−11	48	
14	Alianza Petrolera	40	12	10	18	40	52	−12	46	
15	Patriotas	40	9	18	13	36	43	−7	45	
16	Tigres	40	11	12	17	24	42	−18	45	
17	Envigado	40	11	11	18	37	49	−12	44	
18	Once Caldas	40	10	12	18	34	52	−18	42	
19	Cortuluá	40	11	9	20	36	59	−23	42	
20	Rionegro Águilas	40	8	15	17	30	47	−17	39	

Source: Dimayor
Rules for classification: 1) Points, 2) Goal difference, 3) Goals for, 4) Away goals for, 5) Away goals against, 6) Drawing of lots
(C) Champions

== Relegation ==
A separate table is kept to determine the teams that get relegated to the Categoría Primera B for the next season. The table includes an average of all first stage games played for the current season and the previous two seasons. For purposes of elaborating the table, promoted teams are given the same point and goal tallies as the team in the 18th position at the start of the season.

Pos	Team	2015 Pts	2016 Pts	2017 Pts	Total Pts	Total Pld	Avg	Relegation
1	Atlético Nacional	79	76	87	242	120	2.017	
2	Independiente Medellín	70	73	69	212	120	1.767	
3	Millonarios	62	70	69	201	120	1.675	
4	Santa Fe	62	70	67	199	120	1.658	
5	Junior	69	65	62	196	120	1.633	
6	Deportivo Cali	67	66	53	186	120	1.55	
7	Deportes Tolima	68	57	53	179	120	1.492	
8	Patriotas	58	61	45	164	120	1.367	
9	Envigado	61	51	44	156	120	1.3	
10	Rionegro Águilas	54	60	39	153	120	1.275	
11	Once Caldas	57	51	42	150	120	1.25	
12	La Equidad	54	42	53	149	120	1.242	
13	Atlético Huila	57	42	48	147	120	1.225	
14	Alianza Petrolera	53	47	46	146	120	1.217	
15	Deportivo Pasto	39	44	56	139	120	1.158	
16	América de Cali	31	46	60	137	120	1.142	
17	Jaguares	31	46	59	136	120	1.133	
18	Atlético Bucaramanga	31	55	47	133	120	1.108	
19	Cortuluá (R)	45	45	42	132	120	1.1	Relegation to Categoría Primera B
20	Tigres (R)	31	46	45	122	120	1.017	Relegation to Categoría Primera B

Source: Dimayor
Rules for classification: 1st average; 2nd goal difference; 3rd number of goals scored; 4th away goals scored.

== See also ==
- 2017 Categoría Primera B season
- 2017 Copa Colombia
- 2018 Superliga Colombiana
