= Fernando Torres (disambiguation) =

Fernando Torres is a Spanish footballer.

Fernando Torres may also refer to:

- Fernando Torres (actor) (1927–2008), Brazilian actor
- Fernando Torres (Colombian footballer) (born 2004), Colombian footballer
- Fernando Torres Durán (1937–2019), prelate of the Roman Catholic Church
- Fernando Torres-Gil, U.S. academic and public functionary
- Fernando Torres Graciano (born 1970), Mexican politician
- Fernando Torres-Polanco (1898–1971), Spanish hockey player
- Fernando Torres de Portugal y Mesía, 16th-century viceroy of Peru
- Fernando Torres (weightlifter) (1941–2009), Puerto Rican Olympic weightlifter

== See also ==
- Estadio Fernando Torres, sports stadium in Madrid, Spain
