= Juan Fernando Caicedo =

Colombian footballer (born 1989)

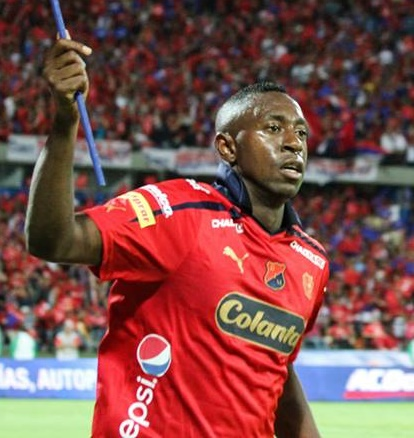

Personal information
- Full name: Juan Fernando Caicedo Benítez
- Date of birth: 13 July 1989 (age 37)
- Place of birth: Carepa, Colombia
- Height: 1.80 m (5 ft 11 in)
- Position: Forward

Team information
- Current team: Llaneros F.C.
- Number: 9

Senior career*
Years	Team	Apps	(Gls)
2010	Cortuluá	8	(1)
2011–2012	Deportes Quindío	42	(19)
2013–2014	Independiente	14	(2)
2013–2014	→ Santa Fe (loan)	12	(1)
2014	→ Atlético Huila (loan)	21	(14)
2015–2020	Independiente Medellín	155	(42)
2019	→ New England Revolution (loan)	28	(5)
2020–2023	Deportes Tolima	76	(22)
2023	Atlético Huila	10	(0)
2024	A.D. Municipal Liberia	11	(2)
2024	Llaneros	17	(5)
2025	Universidad San Martin		
2026	Boca Juniors de Cali	12	(1)
- * Club domestic league appearances and goals as of 29 June 2024

Juan Fernando Caicedo Benítez (born 13 July 1989) is a Colombian professional footballer who plays for Categoría Primera B club Boca Juniors de Cali.

== Career ==
Caicedo began his career with Cortuluá in 2010, scoring 1 goal in 8 appearances. He then transferred to Deportes Quindio in 2011, staying with them for two seasons. Caicedo had a great season in 2012, scoring 13 league goals, including a hat trick against Deportes Tolima. However, he missed two trainings without explanation, which made it seem like he was going to leave, and in January 2013, Caicedo signed with Danubio F.C. of Uruguay. Despite the transfer, he only played a few preseason matches before being released from the club because of problems with Deportes Quindio.

In February 2013, Caicedo signed a 1.5 year deal with CA Independiente of Argentina. His first two goals for the club came in a 3–1 victory against San Martín de San Juan. He was loaned out to Independiente Santa Fe after scoring 2 goals in 14 games. He joined Atletico Huila in 2014 and had a great season, being second in the top scorers list behind Germán Cano with 14 goals. Caicedo's performances interested Independiente Medellín, and they signed him the next year, in 2015.

In his first season with the club, he was one of the top scorers, and was part of the squad that finished runner-up that season. In the next season, he won his first title with the club, the 2016 season.

He signed on loan with New England Revolution of Major League Soccer in December 2018. The deal included a purchase option for New England at the end of the 2019 MLS season, which they decided not to take because of Caicedo's desire to return to Colombia and his subpar performances. On 27 April 2019, he scored two goals against Sporting Kansas City in a 4–4 draw.

Caicedo rejoined Independiente after his loan expired, but signed with Deportes Tolima midway through the 2020 season. He scored on his debut on 14 September against Deportivo Pasto in a 3–1 win. Caicedo scored in the opening match of the 2021 season on 18 January, as well as scoring in the semifinal in the Copa Colombia on 28 January against Pasto. Caicedo was unavailable as Tolima lost in the final against Caicedo's old club, Independiente. After missing the months of March and April with injury, Caicedo returned on 12 May in the Copa Sudamericana, with the league season paused in the quarterfinals of the knockout stage. Caicedo returned to the starting line-up for the knockout stage and scored all three goals for Tolima in the two-legged final against Millonarios, as they won their third title, 3–2 on aggregate.

== Honors ==
Independiente Medellín

- Categoría Primera A: 2016 Apertura

Deportes Tolima

- Categoria Primera A: 2021 Apertura

== Career statistics ==
As of match played on 20 June 2021

Appearances and goals by club, season and competition
Club	Season	League			Cup		Continental (Note: Includes the Copa Sudamericana and Copa Libertadores)		Other (Note: Includes the 2017 Superliga Colombiana)		Total	
Club	Season	Division	Apps	Goals	Apps	Goals	Apps	Goals	Apps	Goals	Apps	Goals
Cortuluá	2010	Categoría Primera A	8	1	0	0	—				8	1
Deportes Quindío	2011	Categoría Primera A	16	6	4	1	—				20	7
Deportes Quindío	2012	Categoría Primera A	26	13	7	3	—				33	16
Deportes Quindío	Total		42	19	11	4	0	0	0	0	53	23
Independiente	2012–13	Argentine Primera División	14	2	0	0	—				14	2
Santa Fe (loan)	2013	Categoría Primera A	12	1	0	0	—				12	1
Atlético Huila (loan)	2014	Categoría Primera A	21	14	3	1	—				24	15
Independiente Medellín	2015	Categoría Primera A	43	17	5	2	—				48	19
Independiente Medellín	2016	Categoría Primera A	38	9	4	0	8	1	—		50	10
Independiente Medellín	2017	Categoría Primera A	27	5	5	1	4	0	1	0	37	6
Independiente Medellín	2018	Categoría Primera A	42	11	1	0	2	1	—		45	12
Independiente Medellín	2020	Categoría Primera A	5	0	–		6	0	–		11	0
Independiente Medellín	Total		155	42	15	3	20	2	1	0	191	47
New England Revolution (loan)	2019	Major League Soccer	28	5	2	0	—		1	0	31	5
Deportes Tolima	2020	Categoría Primera A	7	1	3	1	1	0	–		11	2
Deportes Tolima	2021	Categoría Primera A	11	5	0	0	3	1	–		14	6
Deportes Tolima	Total		18	6	3	1	4	1	0	0	25	8
Career totals			298	90	34	9	24	3	2	0	358	102
