= Henry Rojas =

Colombian footballer (born 1987)

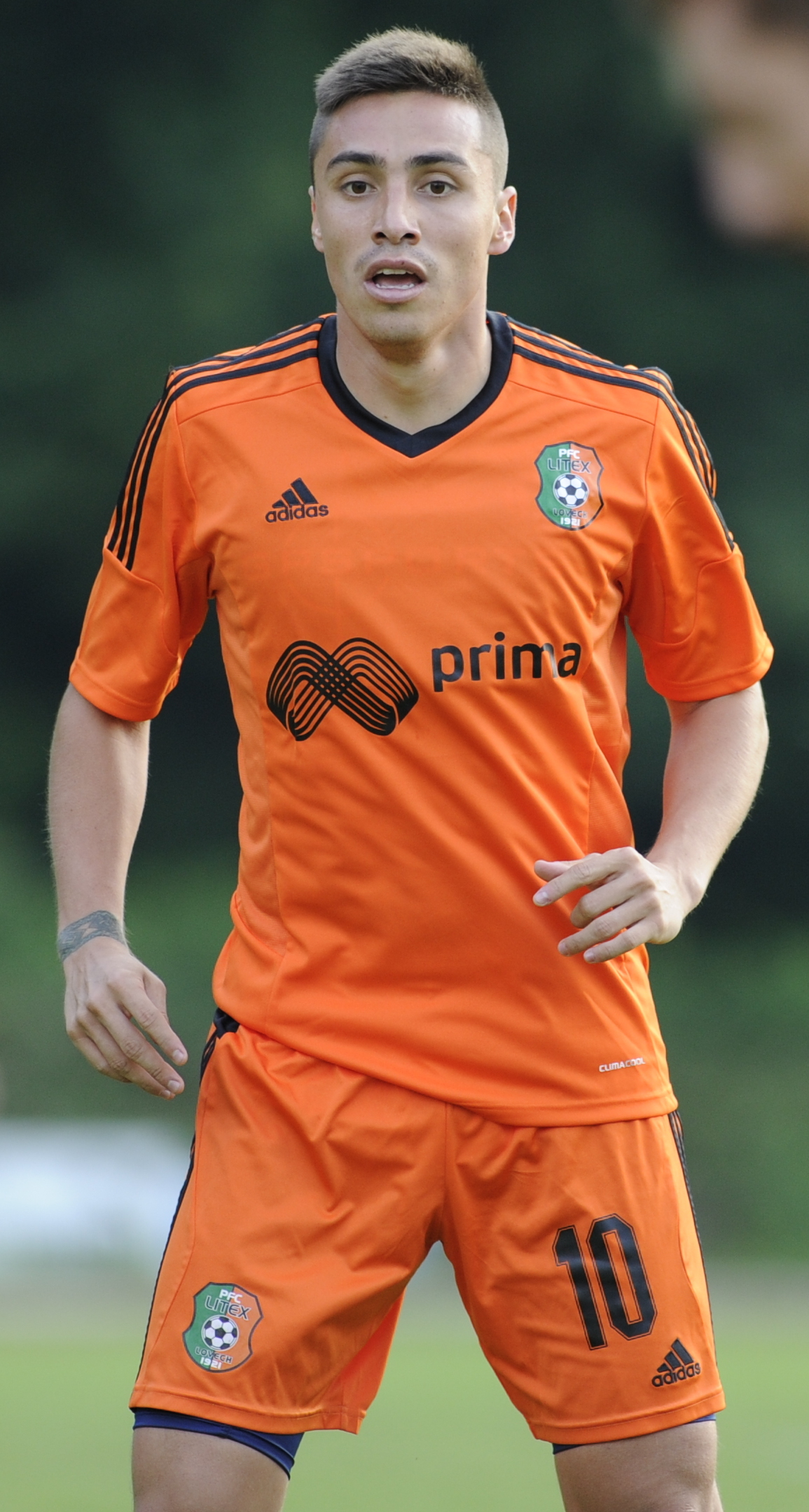

Personal information
- Full name: Henry Andrés Rojas Delgado
- Date of birth: 27 July 1987 (age 39)
- Place of birth: Ibagué, Colombia
- Height: 1.86 m (6 ft 1 in)
- Position: Midfielder

Team information
- Current team: Cortuluá
- Number: 17

Youth career
- –2006: Atlético Nacional

Senior career*
| Years | Team | Apps | (Gls) |
| 2006–2007 | Atlético Nacional | 11 | (0) |
| 2008–2010 | Atlético Huila | 13 | (0) |
| 2009–2010 | → Once Caldas (loan) | 37 | (4) |
| 2010 | Atlético Junior | 3 | (0) |
| 2011 | Atlético Huila | 27 | (3) |
| 2012–2013 | Deportes Tolima | 26 | (2) |
| 2014–2015 | Alianza Petrolera | 45 | (7) |
| 2015 | Litex Lovech | 15 | (2) |
| 2015 | Litex Lovech II | 1 | (1) |
| 2016–2018 | Millonarios | 87 | (9) |
| 2019 | Deportivo Pasto | 33 | (2) |
| 2020– | Atlético Bucaramanga | 7 | (0) |
- * Club domestic league appearances and goals as of 11:27, 25 May 2020 (UTC)

Henry Andres Rojas Delgado (born 27 July 1987) is a Colombian footballer who currently plays as a midfielder for Cortuluá in the Categoria Primera A.

== Career ==
Rojas started his career in the minor divisions of Deportes Tolima and played there from 2002 to 2004. He was later transferred to Nacional minor divisions on 30 March 2004, and earned a spot on the A Squad in 2006. Rojas debuted as a professional on 5 March of the same year against his old team, Tolima. Later in 2006, he was selected to play in the Colombia national U20 team where he earned his starting spot on the team. On 31 January 2008 Rojas went on loan to Atletico Huila for a year. With his impressive play, Henry received several offers from different team later that year and ultimately decided to play in Manizales, Colombia for Once Caldas. His impact on the team was so great, he led Once Caldas to a Champion in the Copa Mustang. Rojas was once constantly referred to as the leader of the team. In 2010, he moved to Junior. In June 2015, Rojas signed a contract with Bulgarian club Litex Lovech, where he remained until December 2015.

== Titles ==
| Season | Club | Title |
|---|---|---|
| 2007 | Atlético Nacional | Categoría Primera A - Torneo Apertura |
| 2007 | Atlético Nacional | Categoría Primera A - Torneo Finalización |
| 2009 | Once Caldas | Categoría Primera A - Torneo Apertura |
| 2017 | Millonarios | Categoría Primera A - Torneo Finalización |
