= Michael Gomez (disambiguation) =

Michael Gomez (born 1977) is an Irish former boxer. Michael Gomez or variations may also refer to:

- Mike Gomez (born 1951), American actor
- Michael A. Gomez (born 1955), American historian
- Mikey Gomez (born 1982), Paraguayan mixed martial artist
- Michael Gómez (born 1997), Colombian footballer

== See also ==
- Mike Gomes (born 1988), Swiss football defender
- Michel Gomes (born 1989), Brazilian actor
