= Sergio Román =

Colombian footballer (born 1995)

Personal information
- Full name: Sergio Felipe Román Palacios
- Date of birth: 21 May 1995 (age 31)
- Place of birth: Manizales, Colombia
- Height: 1.85 m (6 ft 1 in)
- Position: Goalkeeper

Team information
- Current team: Patriotas Boyacá
- Number: 1

Senior career*
Years	Team	Apps	(Gls)
2014–2020	Once Caldas	28	(0)
2021–2022	La Equidad	22	(0)
2023–	Patriotas Boyacá	41	(0)
- * Club domestic league appearances and goals

Sergio Felipe Román Palacios (born 21 May 1995) is a Colombian professional footballer who plays for Categoría Primera B club Patriotas Boyacá.

== Early life ==
Sergio Román was born on 21 May 1995, in Manizales, Colombia.
