= Juan David Niño =

Colombian footballer and manager

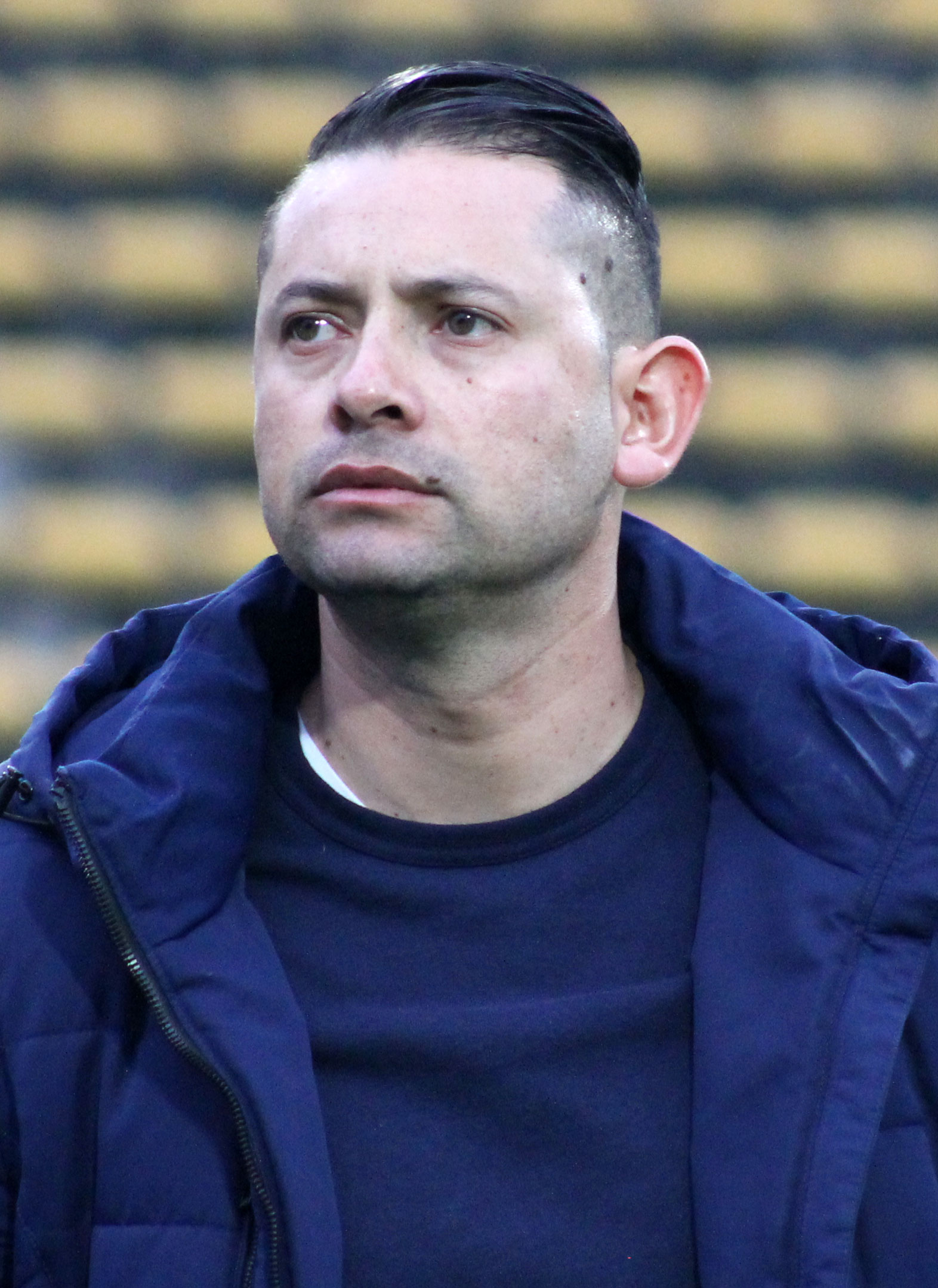
- Niño in 2025

Personal information
- Full name: Juan David Niño Castiblanco
- Date of birth: 27 June 1988 (age 38)
- Place of birth: Tunja, Colombia

Managerial career
- Years: Team
- 2019–2021: Patriotas (assistant)
- 2021–2022: Patriotas
- 2023: Patriotas
- 2024–2025: Real Cundinamarca
- 2026: Águilas Doradas

Juan David Niño Castiblanco (born 27 June 1988) is a Colombian football manager.

== Career ==
Born in Tunja, Boyacá, Niño was a sporting director at local side Patriotas before being named assistant manager of Diego Corredor in 2019. On 17 August 2021, he was named manager of the side in the place of Jorge Luis Bernal.

After avoiding relegation, Niño began the 2022 season in charge of the club, but was sacked on 7 February of that year. However, at the end of the year Patriotas confirmed his return to the helm of the first team ahead of the 2023 Primera B championship.

On 28 May 2024, he was appointed as manager of Categoría Primera B club Real Cundinamarca. With Real Cundinamarca, Niño reached the finals of the 2025 Torneo II in which the team lost on penalties to Cúcuta Deportivo, but left the club on 16 December 2025. The following day he was appointed as manager of Categoría Primera A side Águilas Doradas.

Niño left Águilas Doradas on 5 June 2026, after failing to qualify for the play-offs of the 2026 Apertura tournament.
