= Giovanny Ruiz =

Colombian football manager

Personal information
- Full name: Luis Giovanny Ruiz Guerrero
- Date of birth: 2 May 1975 (age 51)
- Place of birth: Pasto, Colombia

Team information
- Current team: Deportivo Pasto (youth manager)

Managerial career
- Years: Team
- 2002–2019: Deportivo Pasto (youth)
- 2015: Deportivo Pasto (interim)
- 2020: Deportivo Pasto (women)
- 2021: Deportivo Pasto (assistant)
- 2021: Deportivo Pasto (interim)
- 2021: Deportivo Pasto
- 2021–: Deportivo Pasto (youth)

Luis Giovanny Ruiz Guerrero (born 2 May 1975) is a Colombian football manager, currently in charge of Deportivo Pasto's youth categories.

== Career ==
Born in Pasto, Ruiz joined hometown side Deportivo Pasto in 2002, being named manager of the youth categories. In the 2011 Categoría Primera B winning campaign, he was a fitness coach of the main squad.

In 2014, Ruiz managed Pasto on three Copa Colombia matches, as the club played with the under-20 squad as the first team was unavailable due to a strike. On 27 March 2015, he was named interim manager after the departure of Óscar Quintabani. He remained in the role until the appointment of Guillermo Berrío as manager in May.

In the 2020 season, Ruiz was in charge of Pasto's women's squad. On 10 April of the following year, he was again named interim after Diego Corredor was sacked, and was permanently appointed manager on 22 June.
