= Alberto Suárez (football manager) =

Colombian football manager (born 1961)

Personal information
- Full name: José Alberto Suárez Giraldo
- Date of birth: 22 February 1961 (age 65)
- Place of birth: Cali, Colombia
- Height: 1.72 m (5 ft 8 in)

Team information
- Current team: Envigado (manager)

Managerial career
- Years: Team
- 1995–1996: River Plate de Buga
- 1996–1997: Lanceros Boyacá
- 1997–1998: Cortuluá
- 1999: Deportivo Pereira
- 2000–2004: América de Cali (youth)
- 2002: América de Cali (interim)
- 2004–2005: América de Cali
- 2005: Unión Magdalena
- 2006–2008: Cortuluá
- 2013–2014: Jaguares de Córdoba
- 2014–2015: Cúcuta Deportivo
- 2015–2016: América de Cali
- 2017–2019: Deportes Quindío
- 2020–2021: Jaguares de Córdoba
- 2021–2023: Envigado
- 2026–: Envigado

José Alberto Suárez Giraldo (born 22 February 1961) is a Colombian football manager, currently in charge of Envigado.

== Career ==
Born in Cali, Suárez began his career with Categoría Primera B side River Plate de Buga in the 1995–96 season. In August 1996, he took over fellow league team Lanceros Boyacá, and moved to Cortuluá in the following year; in May 1998, he resigned from the latter.

In 2000, after a short period at Deportivo Pereira, Suárez joined América de Cali to work in the club's youth categories. For the 2004 season, he was named first team manager of América, after being an interim during the 2002 campaign.

Suárez left América in 2005, and subsequently managed Unión Magdalena in that year. He returned to Cortuluá in 2006, leaving in 2008 to work at C.D. Escuela Carlos Sarmiento Lora as a coach.

Suárez returned to managerial duties on 6 June 2013, after taking over Jaguares de Córdoba. He was named in charge of Cúcuta Deportivo on 12 June 2014, but resigned the following 9 March.

Suárez returned to América de Cali on 13 August 2015, as the club was struggling to achieve promotion from the second division. He left the club in April of the following year, and was subsequently replaced by Hernán Torres; América went on to finally achieve promotion back to the top tier as champions.

On 2 January 2017, Suárez was named at the helm of second division side Deportes Quindío. After three seasons missing out promotion in the final stages, he left the club, and returned to Jaguares on 17 July 2020.

Suárez opted to leave Jaguares in May 2021, and was named manager of Envigado shortly after. He managed Envigado for two years, leaving on 25 July 2023 after a poor start to the 2023 Finalización tournament.

After working for the amateur Valle del Cauca Football League as sporting director for nearly three years, Suárez returned to Envigado on 25 March 2026 with the team in the second-tier league Torneo DIMAYOR.
