= Michael Gómez =

Colombian footballer (born 1997)

Personal information
- Full name: Michael Nike Gómez Vega
- Date of birth: 4 April 1997 (age 29)
- Place of birth: Barrancabermeja, Colombia
- Height: 1.81 m (5 ft 11 in)
- Position: Striker

Team information
- Current team: Boyacá Chicó F.C.
- Number: 30

Senior career*
Years	Team	Apps	(Gls)
2015–2021	Envigado	128	(13)
2023–2024	Boyacá Chicó	61	(10)
2025	Jaguares de Córdoba	6	(0)
2025–	Boyacá Chicó	16	(1)

International career
2017	Colombia U20	6	(0)
- * Club domestic league appearances and goals as of 12 December 2025

Michael Nike Gómez Vega (born 4 April 1997) is a Colombian footballer who plays as a striker for Boyacá Chicó.

== Career statistics ==
=== Club ===
As of 2 October 2021.

Club	Division	Season	League		Cup		Continental		Total	
Club	Division	Season	Apps	Goals	Apps	Goals	Apps	Goals	Apps	Goals
Envigado F.C.	Categoría Primera A	2015	10	0	2	0	—		12	0
Envigado F.C.	Categoría Primera A	2016	19	4	7	0	—		26	4
Envigado F.C.	Categoría Primera A	2017	22	2	3	1	—		25	3
Envigado F.C.	Categoría Primera A	2018	10	2	0	0	—		10	2
Envigado F.C.	Categoría Primera A	2019	33	4	3	0	—		36	4
Envigado F.C.	Categoría Primera A	2020	12	1	2	0	—		14	1
Envigado F.C.	Categoría Primera A	2021	22	0	1	0	—		23	0
Career total			128	13	18	1	0	0	156	14
