= Dayron Pérez =

Colombian footballer and manager (born 1978)

Personal information
- Full name: Dayron Alexander Pérez Calle
- Date of birth: 24 December 1978 (age 47)
- Place of birth: Medellín, Colombia
- Height: 1.76 m (5 ft 9 in)
- Position: Midfielder

Team information
- Current team: Barranquilla (manager)

Youth career
- Once Caldas

Senior career*
Years	Team	Apps	(Gls)
2001–2003	Once Caldas	6	(0)
2004	Estudiantes de Mérida	15	(2)
2005	Deportivo Italchacao	17	(3)
2006–2007	Boyacá Chicó	62	(8)
2008–2010	Once Caldas	63	(6)
2010	Deportivo Pereira	11	(2)
2011–2012	Cúcuta Deportivo	56	(2)
2013–2014	Atlético Huila	54	(4)
2015	Águilas Doradas	17	(1)
2015–2016	Jaguares de Córdoba	23	(3)
Total		331	(31)

Managerial career
- 2016: Atlético Huila (assistant)
- 2016–2020: Atlético Huila (youth)
- 2018–2019: Atlético Huila (interim)
- 2019: Atlético Huila (interim)
- 2020–2021: Atlético Huila
- 2022–2023: Atlético Chiriquí
- 2023–2024: Envigado
- 2024: Patriotas
- 2025: Yaracuyanos
- 2025–: Barranquilla
- * Club domestic league appearances and goals

Dayron Alexander Pérez Calle (born 24 December 1978) is a Colombian football manager and former player who played as a midfielder. He is the current manager of Colombian club Barranquilla.

== Playing career ==
Born in Medellín, Pérez started his career with Once Caldas, but only featured rarely for the first team during his first spell. He then represented Venezuelan sides Estudiantes de Mérida and Deportivo Italchacao before returning to his home country with Boyacá Chicó.

In 2008, Pérez returned to Once Caldas, and featured regularly before losing his starting spot and moving to Deportivo Pereira in the middle of 2010. In January 2011, he agreed to a deal with América de Cali, but the move was later declared void after being deemed surplus to requirements by manager Álvaro Aponte; the player, however, stated that he was "lied to" by the board of the club.

Pérez subsequently joined Cúcuta Deportivo, being a regular starter before moving to Atlético Huila for the 2013 campaign. After leaving the latter club in 2014, he subsequently represented Águilas Doradas and Jaguares de Córdoba, retiring with the latter in 2016.

== Managerial career ==
Shortly after retiring, Pérez returned to former club Atlético Huila, being named assistant manager for Oswaldo Duran and later manager of their youth sides. On 10 September 2018, he was named interim manager after Néstor Craviotto was sacked.

Pérez returned to his former role after the appointment of Luis Fernando Herrera in March 2019, but was again named interim in October after Jorge Luis Bernal was dismissed. He then returned to his previous role for the 2020 campaign, after the appointment of Flavio Robatto.

On 30 September 2020, Pérez was definitely appointed manager in the place of Robatto who resigned a few days later. He remained as manager after the team's promotion to Categoría Primera A but resigned on 17 August 2021.

On 18 July 2022, Pérez was appointed as manager of Panamanian side Atlético Chiriquí, managing them for 32 matches until his departure on 30 June 2023. Nearly three months later he returned to Colombia, being named as manager of Envigado. He left Envigado on a mutual agreement on 1 April 2024.

On 16 September 2024, Pérez was appointed as manager of Categoría Primera A club Patriotas. He left on 8 December after the club's relegation, and moved abroad on 17 March of the following year, being presented at Venezuelan side Yaracuyanos. On 23 July 2025, Pérez left Yaracuyanos and returned to Colombia, after being appointed as manager of Categoría Primera B club Barranquilla.

== Honours ==
=== Player ===
Once Caldas

- Categoría Primera A: 2009

=== Manager ===
Atlético Huila

- Categoría Primera B: 2020
