= Juan Carlos Díaz =

Colombian footballer (born 2001)

Personal information
- Full name: Juan Carlos Díaz Mena
- Date of birth: 20 May 2001 (age 25)
- Place of birth: Chocó, Colombia
- Height: 1.77 m (5 ft 10 in)
- Position: Left winger

Team information
- Current team: Boyacá Chicó
- Number: 28

Youth career
- –2016: Linaje FC
- 2017–2019: Independiente Medellín

Senior career*
Years	Team	Apps	(Gls)
2018–2022	Independiente Medellín	47	(0)
2022–2023	Coritiba	4	(0)
2023	→ Londrina (loan)	2	(0)
2024	Patriotas Boyacá	30	(0)
2025	Once Caldas	19	(0)
2026-	Boyacá Chicó	0	(0)
- * Club domestic league appearances and goals as of 7 March 2026

Juan Carlos Díaz Mena (born 20 May 2001) is a Colombian footballer who plays as a left winger for Boyacá Chicó.

== Club career ==
=== Independiente Medellín ===
Díaz joined Independiente Medellín in 2017 at the age of 15 from Club Linaje FC in Quibdó. He was promoted into the first team squad in 2018 and was summoned to a league game for the first time in November 2018.

His official debut came on 15 July 2019 against Patriotas Boyacá in the Categoría Primera A, when he came in as a substitute for Yesid Díaz in the 73rd minute.

=== Coritiba ===
On 11 August 2022 it was confirmed, that Díaz had joined Campeonato Brasileiro Série A side Coritiba on a deal until the end of 2023. In January 2023, Díaz joined Londrina on loan until the end of the season. Unable to establish himself in the team, making only three appearances - one of them as a starter - Londrina confirmed on 20 April 2023, that they had terminated the contract with Díaz. The Colombian then returned to Coritiba.

On 30 June 2023 it was confirmed, that Díaz was one of a few players that had been released by Coritiba.

=== Once Caldas ===
After playing the 2024 season at Patriotas Boyacá, which ended with relegation, Díaz joined Once Caldas ahead of the 2025 season.

In November 2025 it was confirmed, that Díaz was one out of five players that would leave the club at the end of the year.
