= Carlos Abella =

Colombian footballer (born 1986)

Personal information
- Full name: Carlos Andrés Abella Parra
- Date of birth: 25 January 1986 (age 40)
- Place of birth: Pitalito, Colombia
- Height: 1.87 m (6 ft 2 in)
- Position: Goalkeeper

Youth career
- Atlético Huila

Senior career*
Years	Team	Apps	(Gls)
2004–2015	Atlético Huila	30	(0)
2005	→ Atlético Nacional (loan)	0	(0)
2006	→ Envigado (loan)	6	(0)
2007	→ Atlético Bucaramanga (loan)	0	(0)
2012	→ Boyacá Chicó (loan)	29	(0)
Total		65	(0)

Managerial career
- 2021: Atlético Huila (interim)
- 2022: Atlético Huila (interim)
- * Club domestic league appearances and goals

Carlos Andrés Abella Parra (born 25 January 1986) is a Colombian football coach and former player who played as a goalkeeper.

== Career ==
Abella was the first-choice goalkeeper for Boyacá Chicó F.C. in the 2012 Categoría Primera A season. He previously played for Atlético Huila.

He was one of the goalies who took part in Colombia national under-20 football team that won the Sudamericana and went to the 2005 FIFA World Youth Championship.
