= Jorge Vivaldo =

Argentine footballer and manager

Personal information
- Full name: Jorge Antonio Vivaldo
- Date of birth: 18 February 1967 (age 59)
- Place of birth: Luján, Argentina
- Height: 1.83 m (6 ft 0 in)
- Position: Goalkeeper

Senior career*
Years	Team	Apps	(Gls)
1989–1990	Arsenal de Sarandí		
1991–1992	Deportivo Español	0	(0)
1992–1993	Arsenal de Sarandí		
1993–1995	Colón	70	(0)
1997–1998	Arsenal de Sarandí		
1998–2002	Chacarita Juniors		
2002–2004	Olimpo	69	(0)
2004–2005	Chacarita Juniors		
2005–2006	Tiro Federal	30	(0)
2006–2008	Independiente Rivadavia	63	(0)
2008–2009	Temperley	1	(0)
2011	Unión de Del Viso		

Managerial career
- 2009–2010: Temperley
- 2010: C.A.I.
- 2011–2012: Tristán Suárez
- 2012–2014: Comunicaciones
- 2014–2015: Sud América
- 2016: Villa Dálmine
- 2016: Comunicaciones
- 2017: Atlético Huila
- 2017–2018: Villa San Carlos
- 2018: Chacarita Juniors
- 2019–2021: Villa San Carlos
- 2021: Comunicaciones
- 2022: Acassuso
- 2023–2024: Sport Boys (assistant)
- 2024: Brown de Adrogué
- 2025: Los Chankas
- 2025: Talleres RE
- * Club domestic league appearances and goals

Jorge Antonio Vivaldo (born 18 February 1967 in Luján) is an Argentine football manager and former player who played as a goalkeeper.

Vivaldo is nicknamed El Flaco.

== Career ==
Vivaldo played for several Argentine teams in his career such as Arsenal de Sarandí, Deportivo Español, Chacarita Juniors, Colón de Santa Fe, Tiro Federal and Independiente Rivadavia. His most important achievement was the promotion to the Argentine First Division with Colón de Santa Fe in 1995.

In 2004, he was close to signing with Boca Juniors under the request of then coach Carlos Bianchi but the deal fell through in a scandalous way when Vivaldo was being the guest of an Argentine football TV show. During the show, the host had a live communication with a board member of Boca Juniors who confirmed that the club was no longer interested in Vivaldo even after he had a verbal agreement with the coach.

== Managerial career ==
In 2009 Vivaldo became manager of Club Atlético Temperley of the Primera B Metropolitana, he then stepped up a division to take over as manager of C.A.I. of the Primera B Nacional.
