= Fernando Torres (Colombian footballer) =

Colombian footballer

Personal information
- Full name: Jonnier Fernando Torres Bazán
- Date of birth: 17 August 2004 (age 22)
- Place of birth: Buenaventura, Spain
- Position: Midfielder

Team information
- Current team: Patriotas

Youth career
- Patriotas

Senior career*
Years	Team	Apps	(Gls)
2024–	Patriotas	26	(2)
2025–2026	→ Gimnàstic (loan)	3	(0)
- * Club domestic league appearances and goals as of 4 March 2026

Jonnier Fernando Torres Bazán (born 17 August 2004) is a Colombian professional footballer who plays as a midfielder for Patriotas Boyacá.

== Career ==
Born in Buenaventura, Torres played for Patriotas Boyacá as a youth, and made his first team – and Categoría Primera A – debut on 3 March 2024, coming on as a late substitute in a 3–0 away loss to Atlético Bucaramanga. He only featured in three further matches during the Apertura tournament, as his side suffered relegation at the end of the year.

A regular starter during the 2025 Categoría Primera B, Torres scored his first goals on 17 March of that year, netting a brace in a 2–0 home win over Internacional FC de Palmira. On 23 July, he moved to Spanish Primera Federación side Gimnàstic de Tarragona on a trial period, and agreed to a one-year loan deal with the club eight days later.

On 4 March 2026, Torres' loan was cut short after just four appearances overall.
