= Cheche Hernández =

Colombian footballer and manager (born 1956)

Personal information
- Full name: José Eugenio Hernández Sarmiento
- Date of birth: 18 March 1956 (age 70)
- Place of birth: Bogotá, Colombia
- Height: 1.75 m (5 ft 9 in)
- Position: Midfielder

Senior career*
Years	Team	Apps	(Gls)
1978–1986	Millonarios		
1987–1988	Deportivo Cali		

International career
1985	Colombia	1	(0)

Managerial career
- 1995–1996: Deportivo Cali (assistant)
- 1998–1999: Deportivo Cali
- 2001: Atlético Nacional
- 2002: Millonarios
- 2004–2005: Panama
- 2006–2007: Alajuelense
- 2007–2008: Colombia (assistant)
- 2008–2009: Deportivo Cali
- 2011–2012: Junior
- 2014–2015: UTC
- 2015: Dominican Republic
- 2016: Deportes Quindío
- 2017: Deportes Tolima
- 2019–2022: Técnico Universitario
- 2022: Patriotas
- 2025: Técnico Universitario
- 2026: Comerciantes Unidos
- * Club domestic league appearances and goals

José Eugenio "Cheche" Hernández Sarmiento (born 18 May 1956) is a Colombian football manager and former player who played as a midfielder.

Hernández played for local sides Millonarios and Deportivo Cali, and also competed in the men's tournament at the 1980 Summer Olympics. He subsequently switched to a managerial role, and was formerly a manager of the Panama and the Dominican Republic national teams, aside from managing clubs in Costa Rica, Peru and Ecuador.
