= Jorge Luis Bernal =

Colombian football manager

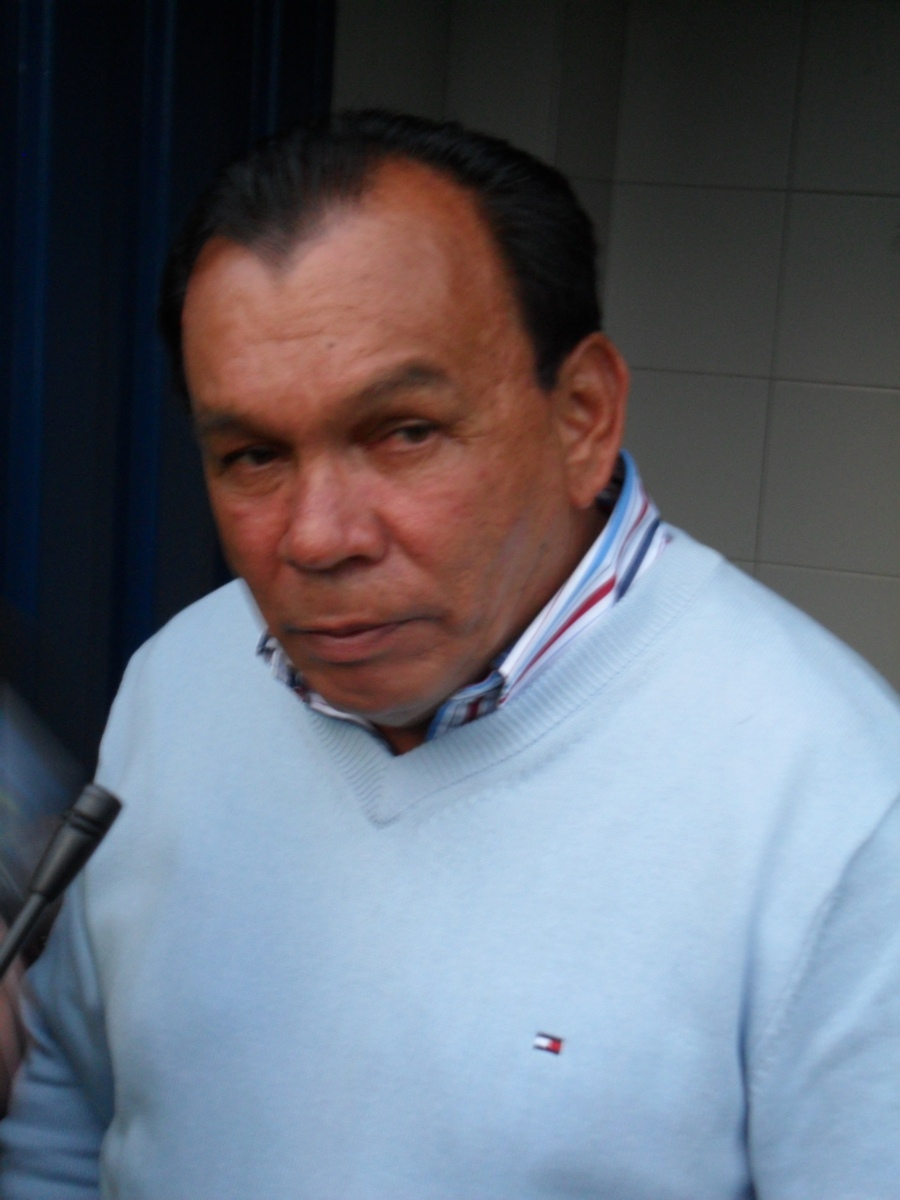

Personal information
- Full name: Jorge Luis Bernal Caviedes
- Date of birth: 27 September 1952 (age 74)
- Place of birth: Ibagué, Colombia
- Position: Forward

Managerial career
- Years: Team
- Ariel Armel
- San Simón
- Deportes Tolima (youth)
- 1986–1987: Deportes Tolima
- 1986: Colombia U20
- 1987: Colombia U23
- 1988–1989: Marítimo de Venezuela
- 1990: San Simón
- 1990–1991: Deportes Tolima
- 1992–1993: Guadalajara de Buga
- 1993–1994: Deportes Tolima
- 1994–1996: Cooperamos Tolima
- 1996: Deportes Tolima
- 1996–2000: Cooperamos Tolima
- 2001–2005: Deportes Tolima (youth)
- 2005–2006: Deportes Tolima
- 2007: Cúcuta Deportivo
- 2008: Deportes Tolima
- 2008: Once Caldas
- 2009: Deportivo Pasto
- 2010: Deportivo Cali
- 2010: Deportivo Pasto
- 2012: Deportes Tolima
- 2013: Itagüí Ditaires
- 2014: Deportivo Pasto
- 2014: Águilas Pereira
- 2015: Jaguares de Córdoba
- 2016–2017: Alianza Petrolera
- 2018–2019: Rionegro Águilas
- 2019: Atlético Huila
- 2021: Patriotas
- 2023: Mineros

Jorge Luis Bernal Caviedes (born 27 September 1952) is a Colombian football manager and former player who played as a forward.

== Career ==
Born in Ibagué, Bernal played amateur football in the 1960s, reaching the Tolima regional team in the end of the decade, but had to retire after a severe arm injury. He then created a club named Ariel Armel Arenas in his native neighborhood, and started his coaching career at the club.

Bernal subsequently worked at local side Club Deportivo San Simón before joining the youth setup of Deportes Tolima in the late 1970s. In the 1980s, he still managed San Simón while working at Tolima, but left the former in 1986 to work permanently for the latter; shortly after a trip to watch the 1986 FIFA World Cup, he was named manager of Tolima's first team.

During his first spell at Tolima, Bernal also managed the Colombia under-20 team in the 1986 South American Games, and the under-23 team in the 1987 Pan American Games. In the latter tournament, his was last of their group, and under poor club form, he was sacked.

After spending the most of 1988 in Argentina, Bernal was subsequently named manager of Marítimo de Venezuela and featured in the 1989 Copa Libertadores with the club. Back to Colombia in 1990, he took over San Simón for a brief period before being appointed in charge of Deportes Tolima.

Bernal left Tolima in 1991, with the club in a severe financial crisis, and managed Guadalajara de Buga before returning to Tolima in 1993, with the club seriously threatened with relegation. Despite winning 21 points out of 30 under his tenure, the club was ultimately relegated, and he was sacked in the 1994 Categoría Primera B.

Shortly after leaving Tolima, Bernal was named manager of Cooperamos Tolima in their first season as a professional club. He won the 1995 Categoría Primera C with the club before returning to Deportes Tolima in 1996, in the place of Julio Comesaña.

Bernal then returned to Cooperamos, where he remained until the club's last campaign in 2000. He then moved back to Deportes Tolima in 2001, now to work in the club's youth categories, before being appointed manager of the first team in 2005.

In 2007, Bernal was named manager of Cúcuta Deportivo, reaching the semifinals of the 2007 Copa Libertadores with the club and qualifying the club to the 2008 Copa Libertadores. He resigned in January 2008, and returned to Tolima before leaving in March.

In May 2008, Bernal replaced sacked Juan Carlos Bedoya at the helm of Once Caldas, but was sacked on 21 November after losing the 2008 Copa Colombia. The following 22 March, he took over Deportivo Pasto, but was sacked in November after again losing the cup and being relegated.

On 2 December 2009, Bernal was appointed in charge of Deportivo Cali, but was relieved of his duties the following 10 April after a poor start of the season. He subsequently returned to Pasto, but was fired at the end of the season after failing to achieve promotion.

On 17 December 2011, Bernal returned to Deportes Tolima after nearly six years, but was dismissed on 26 August. He took over Itagüí Ditaires on 8 January 2013, reaching the quarterfinals of the 2013 Copa Sudamericana before leaving in November as the club was licensed.

Bernal then returned to Pasto for the 2014 season, but was sacked and subsequently took over Águilas Pereira. Sacked by the latter after only two months in charge, he was named manager of Jaguares de Córdoba on 10 August 2015.

On 5 May 2016, Bernal was appointed manager of Alianza Petrolera, where he led the club to an impressive run during the 2016 campaign, but was sacked in October 2017 after a poor run of form. On 31 May 2018, he replaced Hernán Torres at the helm of Rionegro Águilas.

On 1 March 2019, Bernal left Águilas on a mutual consent, and took over Atlético Huila on 15 August. On 26 October, with the club nearing relegation, he was dismissed.

Bernal stayed more than a year without a club before joining Patriotas Boyacá in June 2021, after manager John Mario Ramírez was away on quarantine (and subsequently deceased) due to the COVID-19.

== Honours ==
Cooperamos Tolima

- Categoría Primera C: 1995
