= Fernando Torres (weightlifter) =

Puerto Rican weightlifter (1941–2009)

Personal information
- Nationality: Puerto Rican
- Born: December 14, 1941 Ponce, Puerto Rico
- Died: January 7, 2009 (aged 67) Ponce, Puerto Rico

Sport
- Sport: Weightlifting

Fernando Torres (December 14, 1941 – January 7, 2009) was a Puerto Rican weightlifter. He competed at the 1960 Summer Olympics, the 1964 Summer Olympics and the 1968 Summer Olympics.
