= Jhon Mario Ramírez =

Colombian footballer (1971–2021)

Personal information
- Date of birth: December 2, 1971
- Place of birth: Bogotá, Colombia
- Date of death: June 26, 2021 (aged 49)
- Place of death: Tunja, Colombia
- Height: 1.78 m (5 ft 10 in)
- Position: Midfielder

Senior career*
Years	Team	Apps	(Gls)
1992–1998	Millonarios		
1998	Independiente Medellín		
1999	Deportivo Cali		
1999	Deportes Tolima		
2000	Deportes Quindío		
2001	Atlético Bucaramanga		
2001	Millonarios	13	(0)
2002	Independiente Medellín		
2003	Carabobo		
2003	Santa Fe		
2005–2006	Boyacá Chicó	20	(3)
2007	Bogotá		
2008	Deportivo Pereira	8	(1)

International career
1996–1997	Colombia	6	(2)

Managerial career
- 2010–2012: Millonarios (assistant)
- 2021: Patriotas
- * Club domestic league appearances and goals

Jhon Mario Ramírez (2 December 1971 – 26 June 2021) was a Colombian football manager and former player who played as a midfielder. He last worked as manager of Patriotas.

== Club career ==
Ramírez was well known in Bogotá, where he was a fan favorite during the mid-1990s when he played for Millonarios. He also played club football for Deportivo Cali, Deportes Tolima, Independiente Santa Fe, Boyacá Chicó F.C. and Deportivo Pereira. Ramírez filed a claim against his former team Deportes Tolima, arguing that the club had cancelled his playing contract without cause. In 2008, the Supreme Court of Colombia denied Ramirez's claim for compensation.

== International career ==
He was also part of the Colombia national team. His last game for the national team was a friendly against Norway in 1997.

== Death ==
Ramírez died on 26 June 2021, aged 49 at San Rafael hospital in Tunja after contracting COVID-19 amid the COVID-19 pandemic in Colombia.
