= Patriotas Boyacá =

Association football team from Colombia

Patriotas
- Full name: Patriotas Boyacá S.A.
- Nicknames: Lancero (Lancer); Rojo de Boyacá (Boyacá's Red); Libertador (Liberator); El Verdadero equipo de Boyacá (Boyacá's real team)
- Founded: 18 February 2003; 23 years ago
- Ground: La Independencia
- Capacity: 20,630
- President: César Guzmán
- Head coach: Carlos Giraldo
- League: Categoría Primera B
- 2025: Primera B, 3rd of 16
- Website: www.patriotasboyaca.co
Home colours	Away colours	Third colours

Patriotas Boyacá, also known as Patriotas, is a professional Colombian football team based in Tunja, that plays in the Categoría Primera B. They play their home games at the La Independencia stadium.

== History ==
Patriotas was founded in 2003 by the then-governor of Boyacá Miguel Ángel Bermúdez, together with the then Coldeportes chairman and the owners of hardware business G&J. In its first year in the Primera B, the club reached the semifinals, where it was eliminated by Bogotá Chicó.

In 2004 the team again advanced to the semifinals, where the team played against Deportivo Antioquia, Centauros Villavicencio and Expreso Rojo, but did not qualify. In 2005 Patriotas was second in the general table but in the semifinals was eliminated by Bajo Cauca F.C. In 2009 some changes were implemented in the tournament. Patriotas was first in Group B but was eliminated again in the semifinals and ended up in third place.

In 2011 the team was promoted to the Categoría Primera A after beating América de Cali by penalties in the promotion/relegation playoff. In 2016, the team qualified for the final stages of the top tier for the first time, after placing eighth in the first stage. That year, the team also managed to qualify for the 2017 Copa Sudamericana, which was the first participation of the team in an international competition, reaching the second stage.

Patriotas's first spell in Primera A lasted 10 years as they were relegated back to Primera B at the end of the 2022 season, sealing their relegation on 16 October 2022 with two matches to go in the first stage of the 2022 Finalización tournament after a scoreless draw with Millonarios and a victory for Unión Magdalena against Deportivo Pereira, which ensured the team would end the season in the bottom two places of the relegation table. The team made a quick return to the top flight, winning the 2023 Primera B's Torneo I and later defeating Fortaleza CEIF in the season's grand final to earn promotion.

== Honours ==
=== Domestic ===
- Categoría Primera B
  - Winners (1): 2023

== Performance in CONMEBOL competitions ==
Season	Competition	Round	Opponent	Home	Away	Agg.
2017	Copa Sudamericana	FS	(Chile) Everton	1–0	0–1	1–1 (4–3 p)
2017	Copa Sudamericana	SS	(Brazil) Corinthians	1–1	0–2	1–3

== Players ==
=== Current squad ===
As of 7 October 2026

Note: Flags indicate national team as defined under FIFA eligibility rules; some limited exceptions apply. Players may hold more than one non-FIFA nationality.

No.	Pos.	Nation	Player
2	DF	COL	Alexander Carabalí
3	DF	COL	Diego Montien
4	DF	COL	Juan José Hurtado
5	DF	COL	Erick Zapata
6	MF	COL	Fernando Torres
7	FW	COL	Johan Campaña
8	FW	COL	Carlos Copete
9	FW	COL	Johan Montes
10	MF	COL	Kevin Álvarez
11	MF	COL	Ángel Mora
12	GK	COL	Andrés Palacios
14	FW	COL	José Montes
16	MF	COL	Tomás Molina (on loan from Santa Fe)
17	DF	COL	Hánser Angulo (on loan from Independiente Medellín)
18	MF	COL	Jean Paul Angulo
19	MF	VEN	Freyn Figueroa
20	MF	COL	Estefano Arango

No.	Pos.	Nation	Player
21	DF	COL	Luis Rentería
22	DF	COL	Alexander Porras
24	MF	COL	Juan Sarmiento
25	DF	COL	Samuel Bello
26	GK	COL	Andrés Macea
27	MF	COL	Miguel Bedoya
28	MF	COL	César Salguero
29	FW	COL	Juan Esteban Sánchez (on loan from Santa Fe)
30	FW	COL	Michael Gómez
32	GK	COL	Xavi Betancur
34	DF	COL	Yilberto Palacios
38	MF	COL	Jhoan Ruiz
40	DF	COL	Santiago Martínez
42	MF	COL	Everth Cruz
—	DF	COL	Angelino Mosquera
—	MF	COL	Gerbin Silva

=== Out on loan ===
Note: Flags indicate national team as defined under FIFA eligibility rules; some limited exceptions apply. Players may hold more than one non-FIFA nationality.

No.	Pos.	Nation	Player

== Managers ==
Country	Name	Dates
Colombia	Álvaro de Jesús Gómez	2003
Colombia	Álvaro Zuluaga	2004
Colombia	Harold Morales	January 2005 – June 2006
Colombia	Epimenio Cristancho	July 2006 – December 2006
Colombia	Hernán Pacheco	January 2007 – June 2007
Colombia	Juan Carlos Grueso	June 2007 – June 2008
Colombia	Nelson Abadía	June 2008 – December 2008
Argentina	Mario Vanemerak	January 2009 – June 2009
Colombia	Eduardo Retat	July 2009 – December 2009
Colombia	Orlando Restrepo	January 2010 – March 2010
Colombia	Carlos Hoyos	April 2010 – December 2010
Colombia	Miguel Augusto Prince	January 2011 – October 2012
Colombia	Eduardo Retat	October 2012 – December 2012
Colombia	Arturo Reyes	January 2013 – April 2013
Argentina	Juan Díaz	April 2013 – June 2013
Uruguay	Julio Comesaña	July 2013 – February 2014
Colombia	Harold Rivera	April 2014 – December 2016
Colombia	Diego Corredor	January 2017 – October 2019
Colombia	Nelson Gómez	October 2019 – November 2020
Spain	Abel Segovia	November 2020 – April 2021
Colombia	Jhon Mario Ramírez	May 2021 – June 2021
Colombia	Jorge Luis Bernal	July 2021 – August 2021
Colombia	Juan David Niño	August 2021 – February 2022
Colombia	Arturo Boyacá	February 2022 – May 2022
Colombia	José Eugenio Hernández	June 2022 – December 2022
Colombia	Juan David Niño	February 2023 – September 2023
Spain	Jonathan Risueño	September 2023 – December 2023
Colombia	Harold Rivera	January 2024 – September 2024
Colombia	Dayron Pérez	September 2024 – December 2024
Spain	Jonathan Risueño	January 2025 – August 2025
Colombia	Andrés Cárdenas (caretaker)	August 2025 – December 2025
Colombia	Carlos Giraldo	January 2026 – Present

Source: Worldfootball.net
