= Hernán Torres =

Colombian footballer and manager (born 1961)

Personal information
- Full name: Hernán Torres Oliveros
- Date of birth: 31 May 1961 (age 65)
- Place of birth: Ibagué, Colombia
- Position: Goalkeeper

Senior career*
Years	Team	Apps	(Gls)
1979–1987	Deportes Tolima	113	(0)
1988	Deportes Quindío		
1989	Deportivo Pereira		
1989	Atlético Nacional		
1990–1992	Independiente Medellín	73	(0)
1993	Millonarios	3	(0)
1994	Lanceros Boyacá		
1995	Bello		
1996	Once Caldas		
1997–1998	Cooperamos Tolima		

Managerial career
- 2000–2001: Deportes Tolima (assistant)
- 2001–2003: Deportivo Cali (assistant)
- 2003: Atlético Huila (assistant)
- 2004: Deportivo Pasto (assistant)
- 2004–2005: Deportes Tolima (assistant)
- 2005–2006: Millonarios (assistant)
- 2006–2007: Deportes Tolima (assistant)
- 2007–2011: Deportes Tolima
- 2012: Itagüí
- 2012–2013: Millonarios
- 2014–2015: Independiente Medellín
- 2015: Alajuelense
- 2016–2017: América de Cali
- 2018: Rionegro Águilas
- 2018: Melgar
- 2019: Alajuelense
- 2019: Atlético Bucaramanga
- 2020–2023: Deportes Tolima
- 2023–2024: Emelec
- 2024: Deportivo Cali
- 2025–2026: Millonarios
- 2026: Orense
- * Club domestic league appearances and goals

Hernán Torres Oliveros (born 31 May 1961) is a Colombian football manager and former footballer who played as a goalkeeper.

== Playing career ==
Torres started his career with Deportes Tolima, being involved in the first team squad in 1979. He only made his debut in 1981 in a match against Atlético Nacional, replacing injured Óscar Quintabani.

In 1988, Torres signed for Deportes Quindío. He spent the 1989 season with Deportivo Pereira and Atlético Nacional, before moving to Independiente Medellín in 1990.

Torres joined Millonarios in 1993, but was only a backup option, and moved to Categoría Primera B side Lanceros Boyacá in the following year. He subsequently represented Bello, Once Caldas and Cooperamos Tolima, retiring with the latter in 1998 at the age of 37.

== Managerial career ==
After retiring, Torres became an assistant and goalkeeping coach of his first club Deportes Tolima. He subsequently worked under the same roles at Deportivo Cali, Atlético Huila, Deportivo Pasto, another stint at Tolima and Millonarios before returning to Tolima in January 2007, as an assistant of Jaime de la Pava.

On 11 April 2007, Torres was named manager of Tolima, replacing de la Pava who had resigned the day before; initially an interim, he was later confirmed as permanent manager of the club. He led the club to impressive campaigns in the 2009 and 2010 seasons, but resigned on 28 November 2011.

On 4 January 2012, Torres was appointed Itagüí manager. He left the club on 8 July, and took over Millonarios the following day.

With Millonarios, Torres won the 2012 Finalización tournament and reached the semifinals of the 2012 Copa Sudamericana. On 3 December 2013, after failing to win any accolades during the campaign, he was sacked.

On 22 February 2014, Torres was named manager of another club he represented as a player, Independiente Medellín. He left on 4 May 2015, and moved abroad for the first time in his career on 5 June, taking over Alajuelense in Costa Rica.

On 28 December 2015, after reaching the finals of the 2015 Campeonato de Invierno but losing to Saprissa, Torres was dismissed by LDA. He returned to Colombia the following 4 May, after being named in charge of América de Cali.

After winning the 2016 Categoría Primera B, Torres resigned from América on 2 September 2017, and returned to Itagüí (now named Águilas Doradas) on 13 December. He resigned from the latter on 17 May 2018, and was appointed manager of Peruvian side FBC Melgar seven days later.

Torres left Melgar on 7 November 2018, and returned to Alajuelense the following 29 January. He again left the club on 3 May 2019, and was appointed Atlético Bucaramanga manager six days later.

Torres resigned from Bucaramanga on 8 September 2019, and returned to Deportes Tolima on 6 December. With the club, he won the 2021 Apertura tournament and the 2022 Superliga Colombiana, the latter being the club's first-ever title in the competition.

On 24 April 2023, Torres left Tolima on a mutual agreement, and took over Emelec of the Ecuadorian Serie A on 8 June. Although he helped the latter to avoid relegation in 2023, the club failed to be in contention for international berths and was also unable to win the first stage of the following Serie A season. He then left Emelec by mutual agreement on 1 June 2024.

On 8 June 2024, seven days after leaving Emelec, Torres returned to his home country, being confirmed as manager of Deportivo Cali. However, his tenure only lasted three months, leaving the club by mutual consent on 19 September after a poor campaign.

On 22 August 2025, Torres returned to Millonarios for a second stint as manager. He was dismissed on 28 January 2026 after Millonarios began their 2026 Apertura campaign with three losses in a row, and returned to Ecuador on 23 March, taking over Orense.

On 20 July 2026, Torres left Orense by mutual consent.

== Honours ==
Millonarios

- Categoría Primera A: 2012 Finalización

América de Cali

- Categoría Primera B: 2016

Deportes Tolima

- Categoría Primera A: 2021 Apertura
- Superliga Colombiana: 2022
