= Diego Corredor =

Colombian footballer and manager (born 1981)

Personal information
- Full name: Diego Andrés Corredor Hurtado
- Date of birth: 30 June 1981 (age 45)
- Place of birth: Tunja, Colombia
- Height: 1.79 m (5 ft 10 in)
- Position: Midfielder

Youth career
- Corber de Tunja
- 1998–1999: → Deportes Tolima (loan)

Senior career*
Years	Team	Apps	(Gls)
1999–2003	Deportes Tolima	49	(1)
2003	→ Atlético Huila (loan)	2	(0)
2004–2011	Patriotas		

Managerial career
- 2012–2014: Patriotas (youth)
- 2013–2016: Patriotas (assistant)
- 2016: Patriotas (interim)
- 2017–2019: Patriotas
- 2020–2021: Deportivo Pasto
- 2021–2023: Once Caldas
- 2023–2025: Atlético Huila
- * Club domestic league appearances and goals

Diego Andrés Corredor Hurtado (born 30 June 1981) is a Colombian football manager and former player who played as a midfielder. He most recently managed Atlético Huila.

== Playing career ==
Corredor was born in Tunja, and was bought by Deportes Tolima in 1999 from CD Corber de Tunja. He subsequently made his first team debut for the former club, but was not able to establish himself in the first team, and was loaned to Atlético Huila in 2003.

In 2004, Corredor moved to hometown side Patriotas Boyacá, and helped in their promotion to the Categoría Primera A in 2011. He retired in that year, after struggling severely with injuries.

== Managerial career ==
Immediately after retiring, Corredor became a manager of Patriotas' youth setup. In 2013, he became an assistant of Julio Comesaña in the main squad while also working for the youths, and in 2014 he became the assistant of Harold Rivera.

In April 2016, after Rivera took a personal license, Corredor was named interim manager of Patriotas. On 14 December of that year, he was named permanent manager after Rivera left.

On 3 October 2019, Corredor resigned from Patriotas in order to take a trip to Europe for studies. On 5 December, he was appointed Deportivo Pasto manager for the 2020 campaign.

Sacked by Pasto on 9 April 2021, Corredor took over Once Caldas also in the top tier on 26 August. On 13 February 2023, he left Once Caldas on a mutual agreement, and was signed by Atlético Huila on 22 August. Despite Huila's relegation in that same season, Corredor remained in charge of the team for the following two seasons, leaving the club on 16 December 2025 after his contract ended.

== Personal life ==
Corredor's father Luis Arturo was also a manager, while his younger brother Iván was also a footballer and midfielder. Both Diego and Iván played together at Patriotas.
