= Julio Comesaña =

Uruguayan footballer and manager (born 1948)

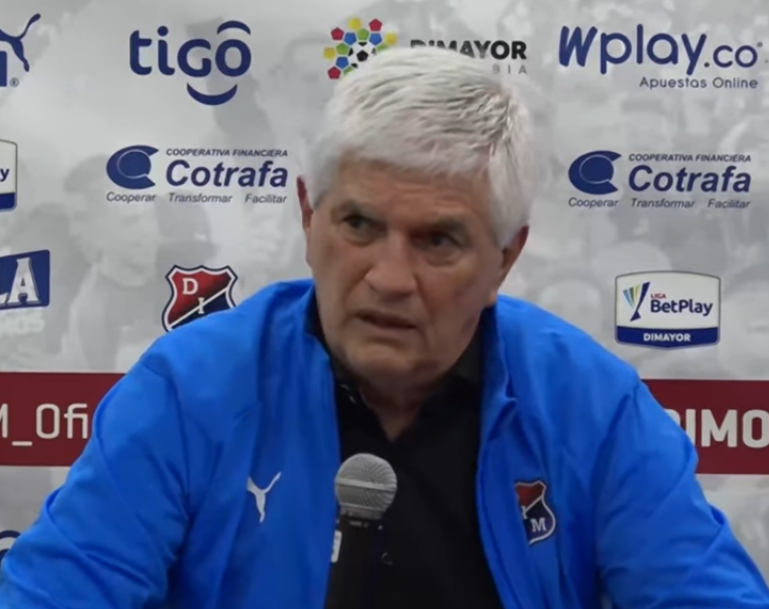
- Comesaña with Independiente Medellín in 2021

Personal information
- Full name: Julio Avelino Comesaña López
- Date of birth: 10 March 1948 (age 78)
- Place of birth: Montevideo, Uruguay
- Position: Midfielder

Youth career
- 1964–1967: Peñarol

Senior career*
Years	Team	Apps	(Gls)
1967–1968	Racing Montevideo		
1969–1970	Gimnasia y Esgrima La Plata	29	(1)
1971	Kimberley	11	(0)
1972–1973	Millonarios	26	(0)
1973	Atlético Junior	25	(2)
1974	Ferro Carril Oeste	4	(0)
1975–1979	Atlético Junior	210	(0)
1980–1981	Independiente Medellín	44	(0)

Managerial career
- 1982–1986: Independiente Medellín
- 1987: Deportivo Cali
- 1988: Guaraní
- 1989–1990: Danubio
- 1991: Atlético Junior
- 1992: Independiente Medellín
- 1992–1994: Atlético Junior
- 1995–1996: Independiente Santa Fe
- 1996: Deportes Tolima
- 1996: Unión Española
- 1997: Atlético Junior
- 2000: Independiente Medellín
- 2002: Atlético Junior
- 2003–2004: Independiente Santa Fe
- 2005: Deportivo Cuenca
- 2006: Real Cartagena
- 2008–2009: Atlético Junior
- 2011: Deportivo Pereira
- 2011: Colombia (assistant)
- 2012: Deportivo Cali
- 2013–2014: Patriotas
- 2014: Atlético Junior
- 2015–2016: Sud América
- 2016: Racing Montevideo
- 2016: River Plate Montevideo
- 2017: Atlético Junior
- 2018: Atlético Junior
- 2019: Colón de Santa Fe
- 2019–2020: Atlético Junior
- 2021–2022: Independiente Medellín
- 2022: Atlético Junior
- * Club domestic league appearances and goals

Julio Avelino Comesaña López (born 10 March 1948) is a former Uruguayan naturalized Colombian professional football manager and former football player.

== Playing career ==
=== Club ===
Comesaña played for 7 clubs during his career as a footballer: Racing Montevideo (1967–1968) in Uruguay; Gimnasia y Esgrima La Plata (1969–1970), Kimberley (1971), and Ferro Carril Oeste (1974) in Argentina; Millonarios (1972–1973), Atlético Junior (1973, and 1975–1979), and Independiente Medellín (1980–1981) in Colombia.

== Coaching career ==
=== Club ===
As a manager, Comesaña has coached 16 teams: Independiente Medellín (1982–1986, 1992, 2000 and 2021–2022), Deportivo Cali (1987 and 2012), Atlético Junior (1991, 1992–1994, 1997, 2002, 2008–2009, 2014, 2017, 2018, 2019–2020 and 2022), Independiente Santa Fe (1995–1996 and 2003–2004), Deportes Tolima (1996), Real Cartagena (2006), Deportivo Pereira (2011), and Patriotas (2013–2014) in Colombia; Guaraní (1988) in Paraguay; Danubio (1989–1990), Sud América (2015–2016), Racing Montevideo (2016), and River Plate Montevideo (2016) in Uruguay; Unión Española (1996) in Chile; Deportivo Cuenca (2005) in Ecuador; Colón de Santa Fe (2019) in Argentina. He also served as assistant coach of Leonel Álvarez in the Colombia national team in 2011.

== Personal life ==
Comesaña naturalized Colombian by residence in 1976.

== Honours ==
=== Player ===
Millonarios

- Categoría Primera A: 1972

Atlético Junior

- Categoría Primera A: 1977

=== Manager ===
Atlético Junior

- Categoría Primera A: 1993, 2018-II, 2019-I
- Copa Colombia: 2017
- Superliga Colombiana: 2020
