= Atlético Huila =

- Full name: Club Deportivo Atlético Huila S.A.
- Nicknames: Los Opitas (The Opitas, from the Opita Spanish language dialect of Tolima and Huila); Bambuqueros (Bambuco Dancers); El Barcino (Light-haired steer)
- Founded: 29 November 1990; 35 years ago
- Ground: Estadio Guillermo Plazas Alcid
- Capacity: 27,000
- Owner: Felipe Olave
- League: Categoría Primera B
- 2025: Primera B, 5th of 16
- Website: www.clubatleticohuila.com.co
Home colours	Away colours	Third colours

Atlético Huila was a professional Colombian football team based in Neiva, that last played in the Categoría Primera B. The club was founded in 1990, making it one of the youngest professional football clubs in Colombia.

The club's best seasons came in the late 2000s; they finished runners-up in 2007 and again in 2009. They played their home games at the Estadio Guillermo Plazas Alcid, which has a capacity of 27,000. The club entered into a hiatus at the end of the 2025 season, following infrastructure issues with its home stadium that led its owners to move the squad to Yumbo, Valle del Cauca Department along with their membership in Dimayor, while its brand stayed in Neiva after it was transferred to a new owner.

Huila had a long-standing rivalry with Deportes Tolima, known as the Tolima Grande derby. The club also had a futsal team named Ultrahuilca Coomotor.

== History ==
The club was founded on 29 November 1990 and was admitted into the Categoría Primera B tournament the following year. In 1992, Alberto Rujana was appointed as manager. That same season, the club purchased midfielder Guillermo Berrío from América de Cali; Rujana named him captain and made him the centerpiece of the squad. As a result, promotion to the top flight followed. The club managed to last in the top flight until the end of the 1996–97 season, when they finished last in the relegation table and were sent back to Primera B.

Rafael Corrales took over the club in 1997, and led them to an immediate promotion back to the top flight. The club managed to consolidate itself in the league, although relegation was a constant danger. Huila escaped relegation only on goal differential in 2002 and had to win a relegation playoff against Valledupar in 2006. This was why the club's performance in 2007 was almost entirely unexpected.

Under the management of Néstor Otero for the 2007 season, the club finished third in the Apertura and qualified for the semifinal phase. They further surprised by winning their semifinal group (beating Millonarios on the final day of the round robin) to reach the Apertura finals, where they were beaten by Atlético Nacional 2–1 over two legs. A similarly unexpected result came in the second half of the 2009 season (Finalización tournament), when the club finished third in the first stage and topped its semifinal group. Once again they were beaten in the finals, this time by Independiente Medellín by a 3–2 aggregate score. The strong performance in the 2009 season allowed Atlético Huila to qualify for the following year's Copa Sudamericana for the first time in history, in which they beat Venezuelan team Trujillanos in the first stage, but were knocked out by San José from Bolivia in the second stage.

The club placed first in the first stage of the 2015 Torneo Apertura, however they were eliminated in the quarterfinals by Deportes Tolima.

After 22 years in the top flight, Atlético Huila were relegated back to the second tier at the end of the 2019 season, finishing in last place of both the relegation table and the year's aggregate table. Their relegation was confirmed on the last day of the regular season with a 1–0 defeat against Jaguares, who were also involved in the relegation struggle.

Following their return to Primera B, Atlético Huila won the 2020 tournament, which did not grant promotion for the following season given that promotion and relegation were postponed for six months due to the effects of the COVID-19 pandemic in Colombia, however they were able to seal their promotion back to Primera A by beating Deportes Quindío, winners of the first tournament of the 2021 season, in a double-legged grand final. Although their return to the top flight was short-lived and they were relegated back to Primera B at the end of 2021, in their return to the second tier for the 2022 season they were able to bounce back from a poor performance in the first half of the season by winning the Torneo II which allowed them to qualify for the Primera B Grand Final against the Torneo I winners Boyacá Chicó. Their defeat in that series forced them to play a double-legged play-off against Deportes Quindío for the final promotion spot, which they won by beating the cuyabro side by a 2–1 score on aggregate, allowing them to return to Primera A for 2023.

On 4 May 2023, 97.203% of the club's shares were sold to the international holding Sociedad FARLAY S.A. led by businessman Michel Deller, who also owns the Ecuadorian club Independiente del Valle. That same year, Atlético Huila suffered a fourth relegation to the second tier, after a poor performance in the first half of the season.

The failed refurbishment works of Estadio Guillermo Plazas Alcid, which were paused since 2016 following the death of two workers after a section of a grandstand collapsed, posed a problem for the club in its later years. After playing away from Neiva while the stadium was closed, in 2018 Atlético Huila had to invest on temporary locker rooms as well as the stadium's lighting system in order for it to be enabled to host games. Without a definitive solution from government entities for the reconstruction of the stadium, it was banned for professional matches due to its structural damage on 28 October 2025, forcing the club to look for a new stadium to host their games. On 14 November 2025, the club announced an agreement with the local authorities of Yumbo, Valle del Cauca Department to move there, pending approval from Dimayor. On 11 December 2025, the Assembly of Dimayor approved the move. As part of the agreement reached with the Yumbo Municipality, the club ceased to play as Atlético Huila, making way for a new club named Independiente Yumbo.

On 25 December 2025, Maruan Issa, club chairman since 2023, handed over the Atlético Huila brand to local businessman Felipe Olave, who sought to build a new stadium for the club as well as returning it to professional competition by acquiring another club's license.

== Honours ==
=== Domestic ===
- Categoría Primera A
  - Runners-up (2): 2007–I, 2009–II
- Categoría Primera B
  - Winners (3): 1992, 1997, 2020

== Performance in CONMEBOL competitions ==
- Copa CONMEBOL: 1 appearance

1999: First round

- Copa Sudamericana: 1 appearance

2010: Second round

== Players ==
=== Notable players ===
- (Colombia) Guillermo Berrío (1992–96), (1998), (2003–04)
- (Colombia) Jefferson Lerma ((2013-2016)
- (Colombia) Fredy Montero (2006–07)
- (Argentina) Rodrigo Marangoni (2006–08)
- (Colombia) Víctor Guazá (2007), (2008–10)
- (Colombia) Lewis Ochoa (2008–09)
- (Colombia) Hernan Córdoba (2009)
- (Panama) Gabriel Torres (2009)
- (Colombia) Iván Velásquez (2009–10)
- (Argentina) Nicolás Ayr (2009–11)
- (Panama) Amílcar Henríquez (2009–12)
- (Colombia) Carlos Carbonero (2010)
- (Colombia) Daniel Bocanegra (2010–12)
- (Colombia) Rafael Castillo (2010)
- (Colombia) Andrés Andrade (2011)
- (Equatorial Guinea) Jimmy Bermúdez (2011)
- (Colombia) Sebastián Hernández (2011–12)
- (Panama) Nelson Barahona (2012)
- (Panama) Alejandro Vélez (2012)
- (Argentina) Hernán Hechalar (2014)
- (Colombia) Juan Fernando Caicedo (2014)

== Managers ==
- (Colombia) Víctor Quiñónez (1991)
- (Lebanon) Alberto Rujana (January 1992 – December 1995)
- (Colombia) Nelson Abadía (1995–1996)
- (Colombia) Rafael Corrales (1997–1999)
- (Colombia) Nelson Gallego (2000)
- (Colombia) Juan Eugenio Jiménez (2001–2002)
- (Colombia) Bernardo Redín (2002–2003)
- (Colombia) Iván Arroyo (2003)
- (Colombia) Félix Valverde (2004)
- (Colombia) Bernardo Redín (2005)
- (Colombia) Néstor Otero (May 2006 – August 2007)
- (Colombia) Javier Álvarez Arteaga (2008)
- (Colombia) Miguel Augusto Prince (January 2009 – March 2009)
- (Colombia) Guillermo Berrío (March 2009 – June 2011)
- (Colombia) Néstor Otero (July 2011 – September 2012)
- (Colombia) Álvaro de Jesús Gómez (September 2012 – June 2013)
- (Colombia) Javier Álvarez Arteaga (July 2013 – September 2013)
- (Colombia) Virgilio Puerto (September 2013 – August 2014)
- (Colombia) Fernando Castro (August 2014 – December 2014)
- (Colombia) José Santa (January 2015 – May 2016)
- (Colombia) Oswaldo Durán (May 2016 – September 2016)
- (Colombia) Virgilio Puerto (September 2016 – December 2016)
- (Argentina) Jorge Vivaldo (January 2017 – May 2017)
- (Colombia) Jorge Bermúdez (May 2017 – June 2017)
- (Argentina) Néstor Craviotto (July 2017 – September 2018)
- (Colombia) Dayron Pérez (September 2018 – March 2019)
- (Colombia) Luis Herrera (March 2019 – August 2019)
- (Colombia) Jorge Luis Bernal (August 2019 – October 2019)
- (Colombia) Dayron Pérez (October 2019 – December 2019)
- (Argentina) Flavio Robatto (January 2020 – September 2020)
- (Colombia) Dayron Pérez (January 2021 – July 2021)
- (Lebanon) Alberto Rujana (August 2021 – November 2021)
- (Colombia) José Santa (January 2022 – March 2022)
- (Colombia) Carlos Abella (March 2022 – June 2022)
- (Argentina) Néstor Craviotto (June 2022 – August 2023)
- (Colombia) Diego Corredor (August 2023 – December 2025)

== Women ==
Atlético Huila Femenino was the women's section of Atlético Huila. They participated in the Colombian Women's Football League organized by Dimayor, the top level women's football league in Colombia.

Atlético Huila won the league championship in 2018, having finished runner-up in the previous season. That same year, they also won the Copa Libertadores Femenina, thus becoming the first Colombian team to win the continental club competition. In 2020, the team entered a hiatus when it withdrew from the domestic league owing to financial reasons. Although they returned to the league for the 2022 season, the team did not enter the league since 2024 as the club's owners opted to focus on the men's and youth teams.
