= 1986 Copa Libertadores finals =

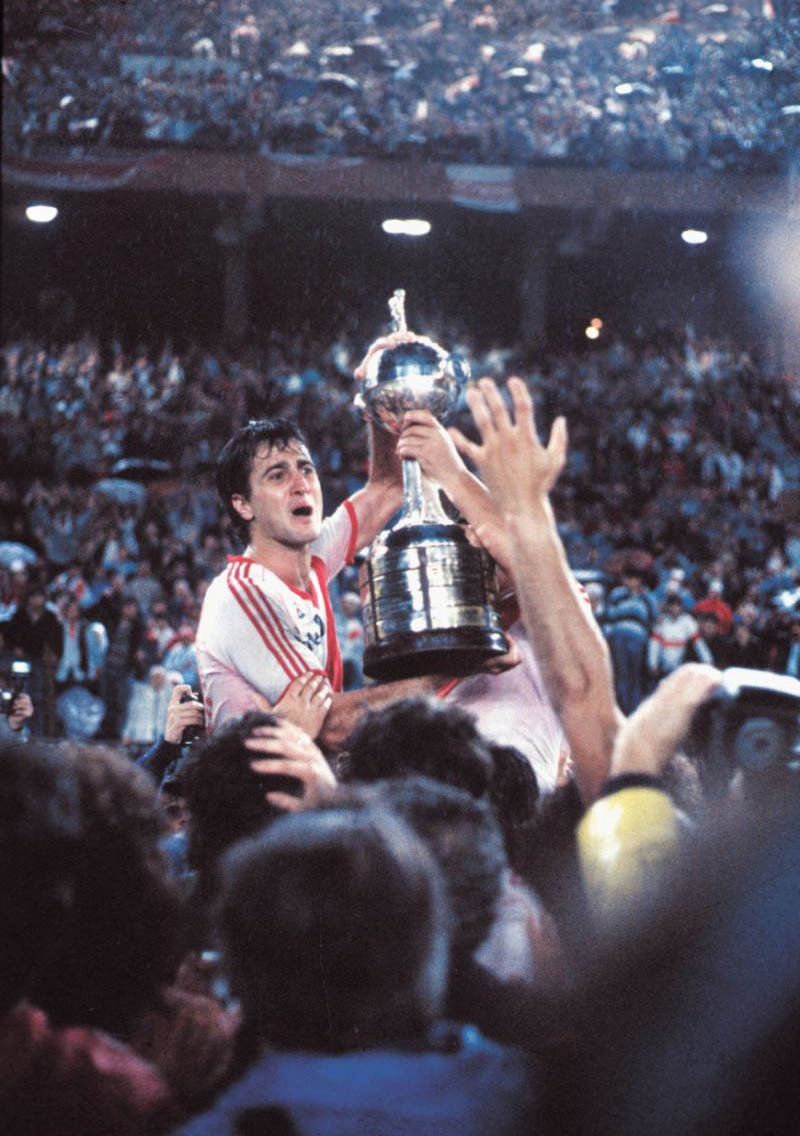
- River Plate, winners.
- Event: 1986 Copa Libertadores
América de Cali	River Plate
(Colombia)	(Argentina)
1	3

First leg
América de Cali	River Plate
1	2
- Date: 22 October 1986
- Venue: Pascual Guerrero, Cali
- Referee: Juan Cardellino (Uruguay)
- Attendance: 50,000

Second leg
River Plate	América de Cali
1	0
- Date: 29 October 1986
- Venue: Monumental, Buenos Aires
- Referee: José R. Wright (Brazil)
- Attendance: 76,857

The 1986 Copa Libertadores finals were the final matches of the 1986 Copa Libertadores, South America's primary club football competition. The two-legged event was contested between América de Cali of Colombia and River Plate of Argentina. The first leg was played at the Estadio Pascual Guerrero, Cali, on 22 October 1986 and the second leg was played on 29 October 1986 at the Estadio Monumental, Buenos Aires. River Plate were making their third appearance in a Copa Libertadores final, while América de Cali were appearing for the first time.

Each club needed to top two group stages to reach the final, playing ten matches in total. América de Cali won their initial group and then topped their semi-final group to progress to the final. River Plate also advanced from their preliminary group, but finished tied on points with reigning champions Argentinos Juniors in their semi-final group. A tiebreaker match was held to determine the remaining finalist, which ended goalless, ensuring River Plate's progression due to a better goal difference.

A crowd of 50,000 observed the first leg at the Estadio Pascual Guerrero, in which the visitors took the lead in the series courtesy of goals from Juan Gilberto Funes and Norberto Alonso. Roberto Cabañas pulled one back for América de Cali, but the score remained. Watched by a crowd of 76,857 at the Estadio Monumental, River Plate extended their aggregate lead in the second half thanks to a Funes goal. No further goals were scored, thus crowning River Plate as winners of their first Copa Libertadores.

== Qualified teams ==
Team	Previous finals app.
(Colombia) América de Cali	1 (1985)
(Argentina) River Plate	2 (1966, 1976)

- **Bold** indicates winning years

== Venues ==
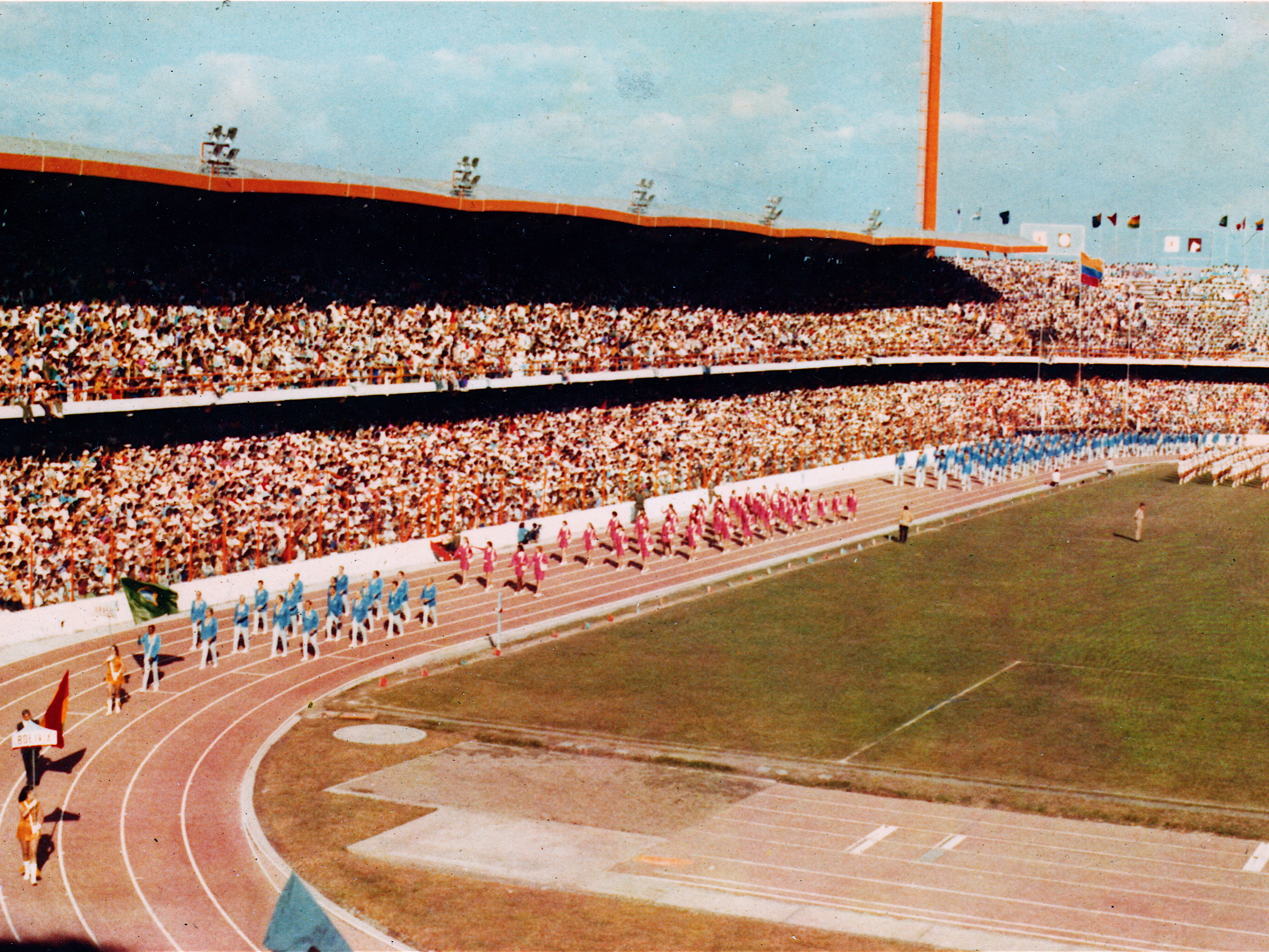
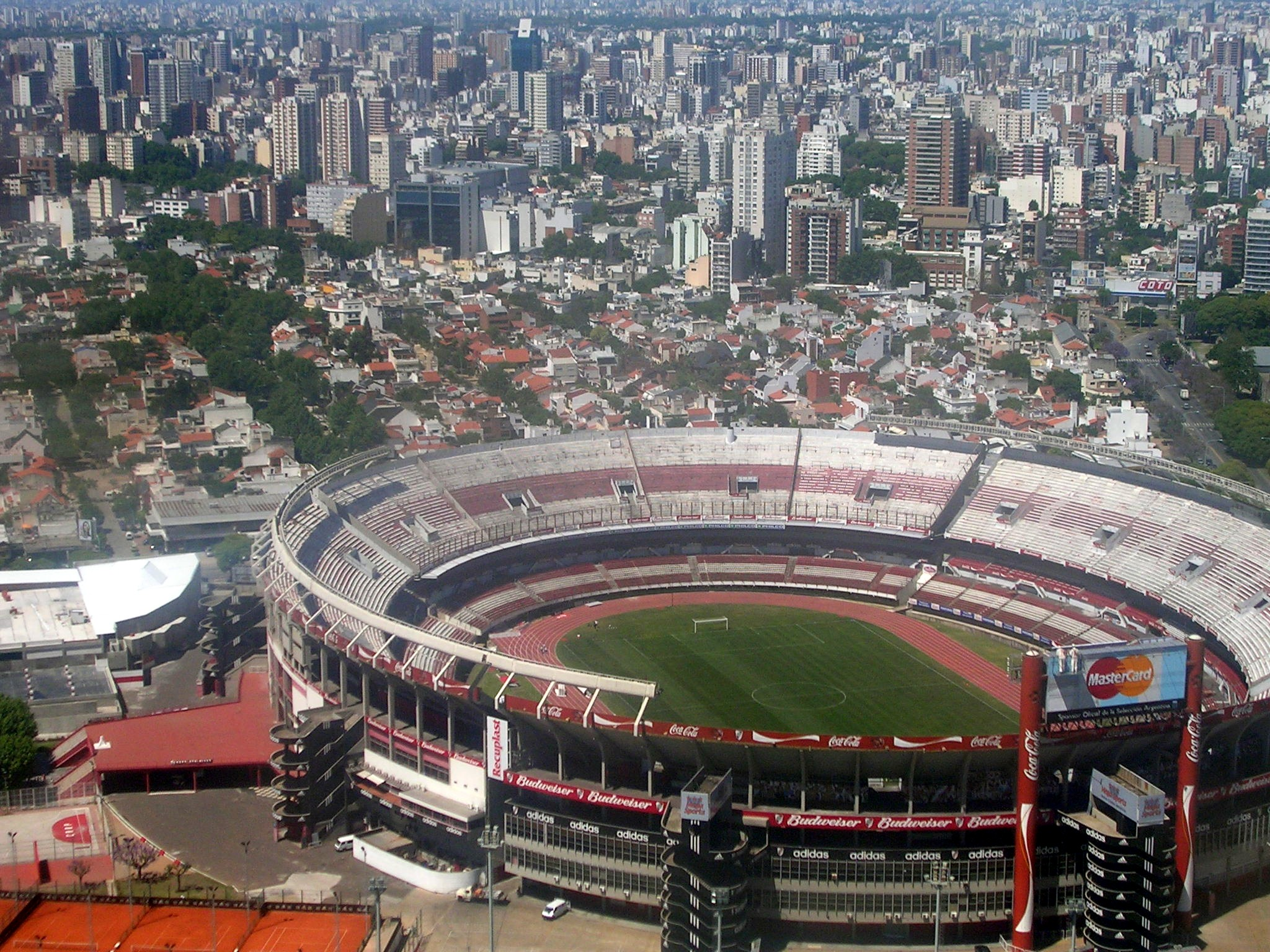
Estadio Pascual Guerrero (Cali) and Monumental (Buenos Aires), venues for the finals

== Match details ==
=== First leg ===
1986 Copa Libertadores finals
22 October 1986
First leg

América de Cali (Colombia)	1–2	(Argentina) River Plate
Cabañas 46'		Funes 22'; Alonso 25'

Estadio Pascual Guerrero, Cali
Attendance: 50,000
Referee: Juan Cardellino (Uruguay)

**América de Cali**	**River Plate**

GK	1	(Argentina) Julio César Falcioni
DF	2	(Colombia) Hugo Valencia
DF	3	(Colombia) Víctor Espinoza (c)
DF		(Colombia) Enrique Esterilla
DF	5	(Colombia) Jorge Porras
MF	8	(Paraguay) Gerardo González Aquino
MF	12	(Argentina) Carlos Ischia	(substituted off) 75'
MF	10	(Paraguay) Roberto Cabañas
FW	9	(Colombia) Willington Ortiz	(substituted off) 75'
FW	15	(Argentina) Ricardo Gareca
FW	7	(Paraguay) Juan Manuel Battaglia
Substitutes:
MF	16	(Colombia) Álex Escobar	(substituted on) 75'
MF	19	(Colombia) Antony de Ávila	(substituted on) 75'
Manager:
(Colombia) Gabriel Ochoa Uribe

GK	1	(Argentina) Nery Pumpido
DF	4	(Argentina) Jorge Gordillo
DF	2	(Uruguay) Nelson Gutiérrez
DF	6	(Argentina) Oscar Ruggeri
DF	3	(Argentina) Alejandro Montenegro
MF	8	(Argentina) Héctor Enrique
MF	5	(Argentina) Américo Gallego **(c)**
MF	10	(Argentina) Norberto Alonso	(substituted off) 78'
MF	11	(Argentina) Roque Alfaro	(substituted off) 67'
FW	19	(Uruguay) Antonio Alzamendi
FW	7	(Argentina) Juan Gilberto Funes
Substitutes:
MF		(Argentina) Pedro Troglio	(substituted on) 67'
MF		(Argentina) Daniel Sperandío	(substituted on) 78'
Manager:
(Argentina) Héctor Veira

=== Second leg ===
October 29, 1986
Second leg

River Plate (Argentina)	1–0	(Colombia) América de Cali
Funes 69'

Estadio Monumental, Buenos Aires
Attendance: 74,300
Referee: José Wright (Brazil)

**River Plate**	**América de Cali**

GK	1	(Argentina) Nery Pumpido
RB	4	(Argentina) Jorge Gordillo
CB	2	(Uruguay) Nelson Gutiérrez
CB	6	(Argentina) Oscar Ruggeri	(yellow card) 73'
LB	3	(Argentina) Alejandro Montenegro	(red card) 52'
MF	8	(Argentina) Héctor Enrique
MF	5	(Argentina) Américo Gallego **(c)**	(yellow card) 48'
MF	10	(Argentina) Norberto Alonso
MF	11	(Argentina) Roque Alfaro		(substituted off) 55'
FW	19	(Uruguay) Antonio Alzamendi		(substituted off) 78'
FW	7	(Argentina) Juan Gilberto Funes	(yellow card) 11'
Substitutes:
MF	14	(Argentina) Rubén Darío Gómez		(substituted on) 55'
MF	17	(Argentina) Daniel Sperandío		(substituted on) 78'
Manager:
(Argentina) Héctor Veira

GK	1	(Argentina) Julio César Falcioni
RB	2	(Colombia) Hugo Valencia		(substituted off) 73'
CB	3	(Colombia) Víctor Espinoza	(yellow card) 48'
CB	5	(Colombia) Víctor Luna	(yellow card) 8'
LB	4	(Colombia) Jorge Porras
MF	8	(Paraguay) Gerardo González Aquino (c)	(yellow card) 63'	(substituted off) 68'
MF	12	(Argentina) Carlos Ischia
MF	10	(Paraguay) Roberto Cabañas	(yellow card) 57'
FW	9	(Colombia) Willington Ortiz
FW	15	(Argentina) Ricardo Gareca	(red card) 52'
FW	7	(Paraguay) Juan Manuel Battaglia
Substitutes:
MF	16	(Colombia) Álex Escobar		(substituted on) 68'
MF	19	(Colombia) Antony de Ávila		(substituted on) 73'
Manager:
(Colombia) Gabriel Ochoa Uribe

== See also ==
- 1996 Copa Libertadores finals – contested by same teams
- 1986 Intercontinental Cup
- 1986 Copa Interamericana
