= List of América de Cali managers =

Throughout history, América de Cali has had a large number of coaches. Following the list of coaches since the beginning of professionalism:

== List of managers ==
Name	Nationality	Seasons
Fernando Paternoster	Argentina	1948
Emilio Reuben	Argentina	1949
Julio Tocker	Argentina	1950
Adelfo Magallanes	Peru	1951
Julio Tocker	Argentina	1952
Ricardo Ruiz	Argentina	1954
Edgar Mallarino	Colombia	1955–1959
Alejandro Genes	Paraguay	1959
Adolfo Pedernera	Argentina	1960–1961
Manuel Sanguinetti	Uruguay	1961
Porfirio Rolón	Paraguay	1961–1962
Miguel Ortega	Paraguay	1962–1963
Francisco Pacheco	Colombia	1963
Porfirio Rolón	Paraguay	1963–1964
Francisco Solano	Paraguay	1964
Porfirio Rolón	Paraguay	1965 (i)
Juan Eulogio Urriolabeitía	Argentina	1965
José María Minella	Argentina	1966
Carlos Tulio Obonaga	Colombia	1966
Porfirio Rolón	Paraguay	1967 (i)
Julio Tocker	Argentina	1967
Porfirio Rolón	Paraguay	1968 (i)
Angel Perucca	Argentina	1968–1970
Guillermo Reynoso	Argentina	1970–1971
Edgar Barona	Colombia	1972
Jorge Ruiz	Argentina	1972–1973
Vilic Simo	Yugoslavia	1973–1975
Pedro Nel Ospina	Colombia	1975 (i)
Antonio Da Corso	Argentina	1976
Julio Tocker	Argentina	1976
Adolfo Pedernera	Argentina	1977
Pedro Nel Ospina	Colombia	1977
Víctor Pignanelli	Uruguay	1978
Gabriel Ochoa Uribe	Colombia	1979–1988
Humberto Ortiz	Colombia	1988
Gabriel Ochoa Uribe	Colombia	1988–1991
Diego Edison Umaña	Colombia	1992
Francisco Maturana	Colombia	1992–1994
Diego Edison Umaña	Colombia	1993 (i)
Hugo Gallego	Colombia	1994
Pedro Sarmiento	Colombia	1994 (i)
Diego Edison Umaña	Colombia	1994–1996
Luis Augusto García	Colombia	1996–1997
Diego Edison Umaña	Colombia	1998
Jaime de la Pava	Colombia	1998–2002
José Alberto Suárez	Colombia	2002 (i)
Fernando Castro	Colombia	2002–2003
José Alberto Suárez	Colombia	2004–2005
Ricardo Gareca	Argentina	2005
Otoniel Quintana	Colombia	2005 (i)
Luis Augusto García	Colombia	2005
Hernán Darío Herrera	Colombia	2006
Bernardo Redín	Colombia	2006
Gerardo González Aquino	Paraguay	2006–2007
Roberto Cabañas	Paraguay	2007
Otoniel Quintana	Colombia	2007 (i)
Diego Edison Umaña	Colombia	2007–2009
Juan Carlos Grueso	Colombia	2010
Jorge Bermúdez	Colombia	2010
Álvaro Aponte	Colombia	2010–2011
Wilson Piedrahita	Colombia	2011
Eduardo Lara	Colombia	2012
Diego Edison Umaña	Colombia	2013
Jhon Jairo López	Colombia	2014
Salvador Suay	Spain	2014 (i)
Luis Augusto García	Colombia	2014–2015
Fernando Velasco	Colombia	2015
José Alberto Suárez	Colombia	2015–2016
Hernán Torres	Colombia	2016–2017
Jorge Da Silva	Uruguay	2017–2018
Carlos Asprilla	Colombia	2018
Pedro Felício Santos	Portugal	2018
Jersson González	Colombia	2018
Fernando Castro	Colombia	2018–2019
Jersson González	Colombia	2019
Alexandre Guimarães	Costa Rica	2019–2020
Juan Cruz Real	Colombia	2020–2021
Jersson González	Colombia	2021
Juan Carlos Osorio	Colombia	2021–2022
Alexandre Guimarães	Costa Rica	2022–2023
Lucas González	Colombia	2023–2024
Cesar Farías	Venezuela	2024
Jorge Da Silva	Uruguay	2024–2025
Diego Raimondi	Argentina	2025
David González	Colombia	2025-currently

Source: Worldfootball.net

== Managers by nationality ==
Country	# Coaches
Colombia	37
Argentina	15
Paraguay	6
Uruguay	4
Peru	1
Portugal	1
Spain	1
Yugoslavia	1
Brazil	1
Venezuela	1

== Titles by manager ==
Coach	Titles	Finalist
Gabriel Ochoa Uribe	7	2
Jaime de la Pava	3	1
Diego Edison Umaña	1	2
Francisco Maturana	1	0
Luis Augusto García	1	0
Alexandre Guimarães	1	0
Juan Cruz Real	1	0
Adolfo Pedernera	0	1
Angel Perucca	0	1
