= Hugo Valencia (footballer) =

Colombian footballer (born 1955)

Personal information
- Full name: Hugo Enrique Valencia
- Date of birth: 27 June 1955 (age 71)
- Place of birth: Jamundí, Colombia
- Height: 1.77 m (5 ft 9 1/2 in)
- Position: Full-back

Youth career
- 1976–1979: América de Cali

Senior career*
Years	Team	Apps	(Gls)
1979–1988	América de Cali	364	(2)

International career
1981	Colombia	1	(0)

Managerial career
- 1999: Deportivo Táchira
- 2012–????: Jamundí FC
- * Club domestic league appearances and goals

Hugo Enrique Valencia (born 27 June 1955), nicknamed El Pitillo, is a Colombian former footballer who played as a full-back.

== Career ==
Valencia started playing amateur football as both a sweeper and midfielder, before one of his coaches moved him to the full-back position. In 1976, he joined América de Cali, before being promoted to the first team in 1979 and making his league debut under Gabriel Ochoa Uribe on 28 February 1979 in a match against Deportes Quindío.

At América de Cali, he was part of a defense that was made up of himself, Luis Eduardo Reyes, Aurelio Pascuttini, and José Chaparro. His final appearance for the club came on 18 December 1899, against Deportivo Pereira. Overall, he made 364 league appearances for América de Cali, as well as 64 appearances in the Copa Libertadores. At the time of his retirement, he was known as the "The Six-Star General", having won six league titles with the club.

Valencia made one appearance for the Colombia national team in 1981, during a 1–1 friendly match against Spain.

== Personal life ==
Valencia has two daughters. His nickname, 'El Pitillo' ('Little Cigarette'), was given to him by journalist Mario Alonso Escobar because of his skinny legs.

In October 2015, Valencia suffered a stroke. At the time, he had been coaching Jamundí FC for three years.

== Honours ==
- Campeonato Profesional: 1979, 1982, 1983, 1984, 1985, 1986
- Copa Libertadores runners-up: 1985, 1986, 1987
