= Álex Escobar =

Colombian footballer (born 1965)

Personal information
- Full name: Alexander Escobar Gañán
- Date of birth: 8 February 1965 (age 61)
- Place of birth: Cali, Colombia
- Height: 1.70 m (5 ft 7 in)
- Position: Midfielder

Team information
- Current team: América de Cali (U20 and assistant manager)

Senior career*
Years	Team	Apps	(Gls)
1983–1996	América de Cali	505	(75)
1996	→ Atlético Mineiro (loan)	8	(0)
1997–2000	LDU Quito	126	(26)
2001	Millonarios	21	(0)
2001	Deportivo Pereira	21	(0)
2002–2005	LDU Quito	111	(8)
Total		792	(109)

International career
1985–1995	Colombia	12	(1)

Managerial career
- 2005–2006: LDU Quito (assistant)
- 2007: América de Cali
- 2007–2009: América de Cali (assistant)
- 2010: Junior (assistant)
- 2011: Juan Aurich (assistant)
- 2013: América de Cali (assistant)
- 2016–2017: Orsomarso
- 2024–: América de Cali U20
- 2024: América de Cali (caretaker)
- 2025: América de Cali (caretaker)
- 2025–: América de Cali (assistant)
- * Club domestic league appearances and goals

Alexander Escobar Gañán (born 8 February 1965), also known as Álex Escobar, is a Colombian football manager and former footballer who played as a midfielder. He is the current manager of the under-20 squad of América de Cali and assistant manager for the first team.

Escobar is highly regarded in América de Cali and LDU Quito, as well as in the Colombia national team. With América, he won six Primera A titles, whilst with the Ecuadorian club he won four Serie A titles. He is also the player with most appearances in América de Cali.

== Club career ==
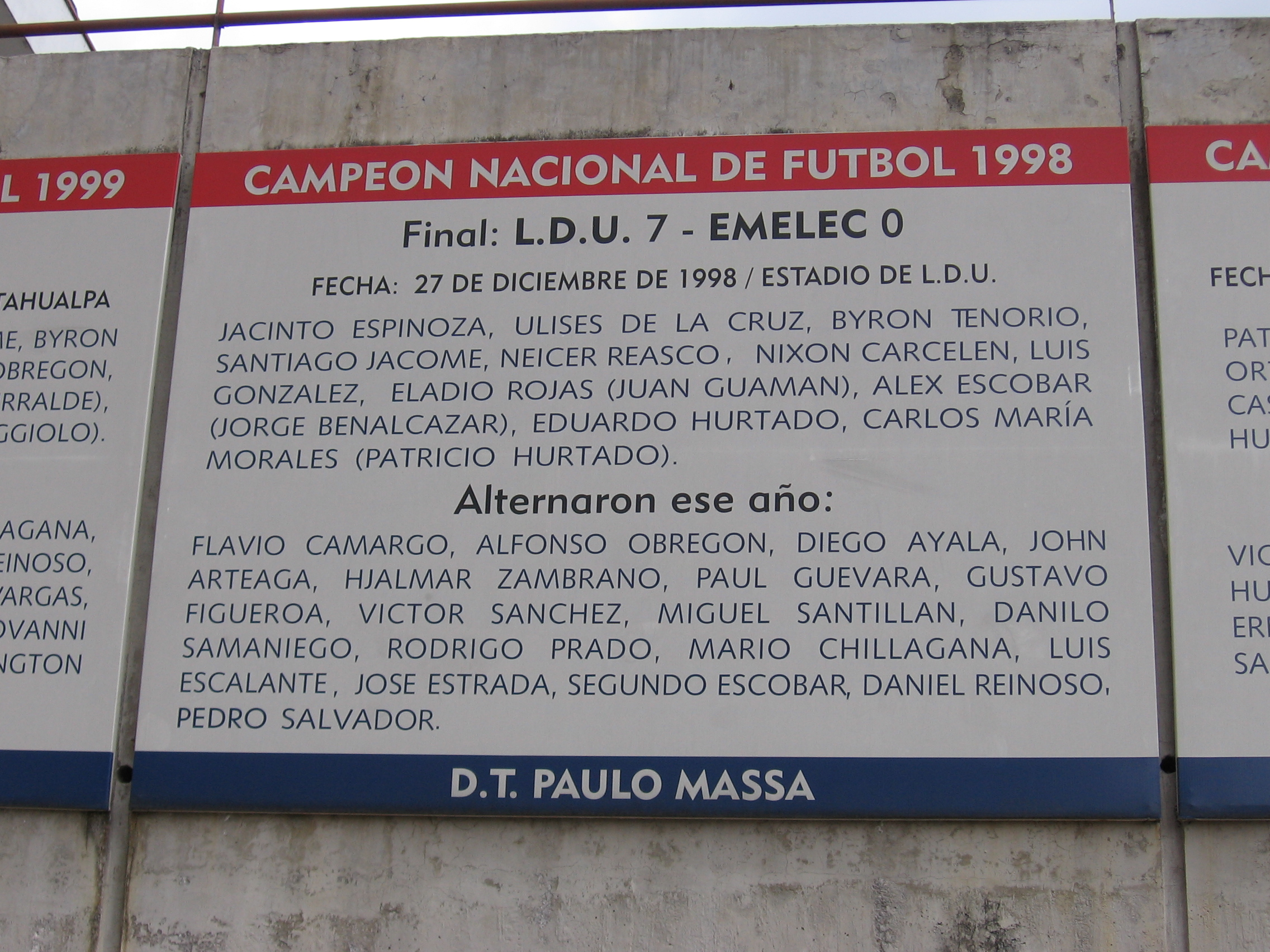
Escobar in the commemorative plaque of the 1998 LDU Quito Final.

Escobar was born in Cali on 8 February 1965. His father was Hernán Escobar Echeverry, a retired defender that played in América de Cali, Atlético Nacional and Independiente Medellín. Escobar scored 14 goals in 83 matches in the Copa Libertadores from 1984 to 2004, making him the 9th player with most appearances in the tournament on 27 March 2004.

=== América de Cali ===
Escobar was part of the youth team of América de Cali, and played for the national football team of Valle del Cauca on 1982 and 1983. He debuted for América on 1983, and played for the team until 1997, when was transferred to LDU de Quito. Escobar is the player with most appearances for América, with 505 games played, and with 75 goals scored.

== International career ==
Escobar made his international debut on 3 November 1985 (at just 20 years old), while playing for América de Cali, in the match against Paraguay for the 1986 FIFA World Cup qualifying. The match ended with a 2–1 win, but Colombia (who had lost the previous game 4–0) was eliminated.

Two years later he was part of the national squad for the 1987 Copa América, in which Colombia finished third. Escobar only played one match, the 2–1 win against the host Argentina in the third-place match.

Escobar scored his only goal for the national team in the 74th minute of the 2–2 draw against South Korea on 26 February 1994 in a friendly match.

== Career statistics ==
=== Club ===
This table is incomplete, thus some stats and totals could be incorrect.

Club performance			League		Cup		Continental		Total	
Season	Club	League	Apps	Goals	Apps	Goals	Apps	Goals	Apps	Goals
Colombia			League		Cup		South America		Total	
1983	América de Cali	Campeonato Profesional	2	1	0	0	0	0	2	1
1984	América de Cali	Campeonato Profesional	38	8	0	0	-	0	38	8
1985	América de Cali	Campeonato Profesional	47	4	0	0	-	0	47	4
1986	América de Cali	Campeonato Profesional	43	3	0	0	2+	1	45	4
1987	América de Cali	Campeonato Profesional	37	4	0	0	3+	3	40	7
1988	América de Cali	Campeonato Profesional	37	5	0	0	-	0	37	5
1989	América de Cali	Campeonato Profesional	36	8	0	0	0	0	36	8
1990	América de Cali	Categoría Primera A	43	9	0	0	0	0	43	9
1991	América de Cali	Categoría Primera A	38	4	0	0	8	1	46	5
1992	América de Cali	Categoría Primera A	46	3	0	0	1+	1	47	4
1993	América de Cali	Categoría Primera A	21	3	0	0	13	3	34	6
1994	América de Cali	Categoría Primera A	46	7	0	0	0	0	46	7
1995	América de Cali	Categoría Primera A	20	2	0	0	0	0	20	2
1995–96	América de Cali	Categoría Primera A	42	14	0	0	15	4	57	18
Brazil			League		Cup		South America		Total	
1996	Atlético Mineiro	Campeonato Brasileiro	8	0	0	0	0	0	8	0
Colombia			League		Cup		South America		Total	
1996–97	América de Cali	Categoría Primera A	9	0	0	0	3+	1	12	1
Ecuador			League		Cup		South America		Total	
1997	LDU de Quito	Ecuadorian Serie A	?	?	-	-	-	-	?	?
1998	LDU de Quito	Ecuadorian Serie A	?	?	-	-	?	0	?	?
1999	LDU de Quito	Ecuadorian Serie A	34	4	-	-	7	0	41	4
2000	LDU de Quito	Ecuadorian Serie A	28	2	-	-	6	0	34	2
Colombia			League		Cup		South America		Total	
2001	Millonarios	Categoría Primera A	21	0	0	0	0	0	21	0
2001	Deportivo Pereira	Categoría Primera A	21	0	0	0	0	0	21	0
Ecuador			League		Cup		South America		Total	
2002	LDU de Quito	Ecuadorian Serie A	34	3	0	0	0	0	34	3
2003	LDU de Quito	Ecuadorian Serie A	38	2	-	-	4	0	42	2
2004	LDU de Quito	Ecuadorian Serie A	37	3	-	-	5	0	42	3
2005	LDU de Quito	Ecuadorian Serie A	2	0	-	-	0	0	2	0
Total	Brazil		8	0	0	0	0	0	8	0
Total	Colombia		547	75	0	0	45	14	592	89
Total	Ecuador		237	34	0	0	22	0	259	34
Total	Career total		792	109	0	0	67	14	859	123

=== International ===
==== International appearances ====
Team	Year	Apps	Goals
Colombia	1985	1	0
Colombia	1987	1	0
Colombia	1991	2	0
Colombia	1994	7	1
Colombia	1995	1	0
Total		12	1

==== International goals ====
International goals
No.	Date	Venue	Opponent	Score	Result	Competition
1	1994-02-26	Weingart Stadium, Los Angeles, USA	South Korea	1–2	2–2	Friendly match

== Honours ==
=== Player ===
América de Cali

- Primera A (6): 1983, 1984, 1985, 1986, 1990, 1992

Runner-up (3): 1987, 1991, 1995

- Copa Libertadores

Runner-up (4): 1985, 1986, 1987, 1996

Atlético Mineiro

- Copa Master de CONMEBOL

Runner-up (1): 1996

LDU Quito

- Serie A (4): 1998, 1999, 2003, 2005 Apertura

=== Assistant coach ===
América de Cali

- Primera A (1): 2008 Finalización

Runner-up (1): 2008 Apertura

Juan Aurich

- Torneo Descentralizado (1): 2011

Junior

- Primera A (1): 2010 Apertura
