= FSS (brand) =

Colombian sports apparel manufacturer

Fabricamos Su Sudadera (FSS)
- Type: Private
- Industry: Sportswear
- Founded: 1987
- Headquarters: Bogotá, Colombia,
- Products: Footwear; Sportswear
- Website: fss.com.co

Fabricamos su Sudadera Ltda is a sports apparel manufacturer founded in 1987 in Bogotá, Colombia. FSS have manufactured, with the proper approval and permits, uniforms for international brands like Adidas, Topper, Fila, Puma, Patrick, and Reebok.

FSS has a production plant involved in every step of the creation process: cutting, stamping, confection. FSS makes and distributes sporting goods, but the creation of uniforms for different schools and corporate sports leagues is its main production source. FSS produces about 15,000 articles per year.

== Sponsorship ==
FSS has sponsored several teams of Colombian professional soccer from Categoría Primera A and Categoría Primera B, some participants in the Copa Libertadores and in the 2004 Intercontinental Cup. Some teams:

- (Colombia) Real Cartagena
- (Colombia) Unión Magdalena
- (Colombia) Atlético Juventud

== Affiliates ==
Over the years 2008 and 2009 FSS had two subsidiaries brands on account of its sponsorship to América de Cali.

=== América Sport Wear (ASW) ===
ASW logo

América Sport Wear (ASW) was a sportswear brand owned by América de Cali, this brand was created in 2008 because the sponsorship deal with sports brand FSS it had at the time for your clothes was affected because América de Cali was on the Clinton law list. However FSS continued to design and manufacture of ASW. ASW was short-lived, only use in 2008 when América de Cali was crowned champion of the 2008 Categoría Primera A season.

=== Nuevo América Sport (NAS) ===
NAS logo

First NAS logo

Nuevo América Sport (NAS) was a sportswear brand owned by New América de Cali, this brand was born in 2009 in conjunction with the process of democratization of América de Cali and to continue the same management that had been given in 2008 to the sponsorship of the sports brand FSS responsible for the design and manufacture of NAS. NAS was used only in the year 2009.
