= Hugo Valencia =

Hugo Valencia might refer to:

- Hugo Valencia (footballer), Colombian international footballer
- Hugo Valencia (swimmer), Mexican swimmer who competed at the 1972 Summer Olympics
