= Roberto Cabañas =

Paraguayan footballer (1961–2017)

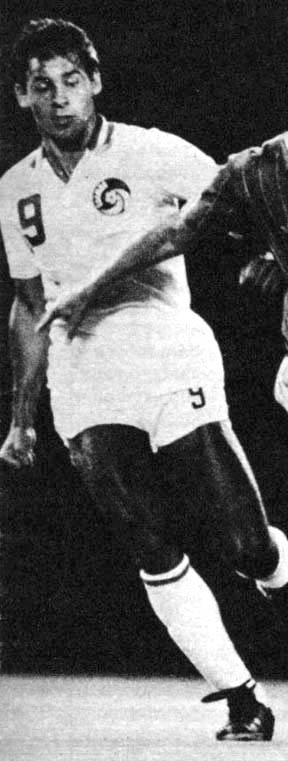
- Cabañas with the NY Cosmos in 1984

Personal information
- Full name: Roberto Cabañas González
- Date of birth: 11 April 1961
- Place of birth: Pilar, Paraguay
- Date of death: 9 January 2017 (aged 55)
- Place of death: Asunción, Paraguay
- Height: 1.83 m (6 ft 0 in)
- Position: Forward

Senior career*
Years	Team	Apps	(Gls)
1978–1980	Cerro Porteño	0	(0)
1980–1984	New York Cosmos	97	(63)
1984–1987	América de Cali	75	(40)
1988–1990	Brest	53	(31)
1990–1991	Lyon	27	(9)
1991–1993	Boca Juniors	56	(16)
1993–1994	Barcelona SC		
1995	Boca Juniors	4	(0)
1996	Libertad	0	(0)
1996	Independiente Medellín	7	(2)
2000	Real Cartagena	9	(2)

International career
1979–1993	Paraguay	28	(11)
- * Club domestic league appearances and goals

Roberto Cabañas González (11 April 1961 – 9 January 2017) was a Paraguayan professional footballer who played as a forward.

== Career ==
During his career, Cabañas played for Cerro Porteño of Paraguay, Brest and Lyon of France, the New York Cosmos (winning the 1980 and 1982 NASL championship and top scorer and NASL MVP in 1983), América de Cali of Colombia (helping the team in reaching three consecutive Copa Libertadores finals) and Boca Juniors of Argentina (winning the 1992 Apertura tournament and the 1992 Copa Master de Supercopa).

After representing Paraguay at the 1979 FIFA World Youth Championship, Cabañas became a key player of the Paraguay national team during the 1980s. Cabañas was not only pivotal in Paraguay's qualification for the Mexico 1986 World Cup, but he also scored the two goals against Belgium in the pivotal third group match, thus tying the game at 2–2. This allowed Paraguay to qualify second in their group, behind Mexico.

== Later life and death ==
After retiring, Cabañas settled in Cali, Colombia, where he married and had two children.

Cabañas died of a heart attack in Asunción in January 2017, Paraguay. He was 55.

== Honours ==
New York Cosmos

- NASL:
  - Seasons: 1980, 1982
  - National Conference : 1980, 1981, 1982
  - Eastern Division: 1980, 1981, 1982, 1983

América de Cali

- Primera A: 1985, 1986

Boca Juniors

- Primera División: 1992 Apertura
- Copa Master de Supercopa: 1992

Paraguay

- Copa América: 1979

Individual

- South American Team of the Year: 1986
