= Copa Centenario Batalla de Boyacá =

The Copa del Centenario de la Batalla de Boyacá was the second official tournament in the history of the Colombian football, organized to commemorate 100 years since the Battle of Boyacá. The format of the tournament was similar to the 1918 Campeonato Nacional format, because it was played only between teams from the same city: Cali. This tournament was divided in two groups, each group having three teams with only one champion.

== Copa de Menores 1919 ==
The first tournament was disputed on August 3, 1919. All the matches were disputed the same day.

Teams:

- América F.C.
- Latino del Valle
- Ayacucho Cali

=== First Round ===
August 3, 1919

| Ayacucho Cali | 1–2 | Latino del Valle |
|---|---|---|
| | Report |

Cali

=== Final ===
August 3, 1919

| América F.C. | 3–0 | Latino del Valle |
|---|---|---|
| | Report |

Cali

1919 Copa de Menores Champion
América F.C.
First Title

== Senior Cup ==
The second tournament was disputed on August 7, 1919. All the matches were disputed the same day.

Teams:

- Hispania de Cali
- Valle F.C.
- Palmira XI

=== First Round ===
August 7, 1919

| Palmira XI | 2–1 | Hispania de Cali |
|---|---|---|
| | Report |

Cali

=== Final ===
August 7, 1919

| Valle F.C. | 3–0 Awarded | Palmira XI |
|---|---|---|
| | Report |

Cali

1919 Copa del Centenario Champion
Valle F.C.
First Title
