= Gerardo González Aquino =

Paraguayan footballer (born 1953)

Personal information
- Full name: Sabino Gerardo González Aquino
- Date of birth: 27 October 1953 (age 73)
- Place of birth: Asunción, Paraguay
- Height: 1.66 m (5 ft 5 in)
- Position: Midfielder

Senior career*
Years	Team	Apps	(Gls)
1973–1975	Club Nacional		
1975–1978	Cerro Porteño		
1979–1987	América de Cali	302	(11)

International career
1976–1977	Paraguay	17	(0)

Managerial career
- 1989: Deportivo Pereira
- 1991–1992: Once Caldas
- 1994–1995: Cerro Porteño
- Club Guaraní
- 1996: Deportes Tolima
- 2006–2007: América de Cali
- 2011: Paraguay U17
- 2015: Paraguay U15
- * Club domestic league appearances and goals

Sabino Gerardo González Aquino (born 27 October 1953) is a Paraguayan football manager and former footballer who played as a midfielder.

== Playing career ==
In 1979, both he and teammate Juan Manuel Battaglia signed for Colombian side América de Cali. His league debut for the club came on 18 February 1979 against Cúcuta Deportivo, during the opening match of the 1979 Campeonato Profesional, later helping the club win their first professional title that season. He made a total of 302 league appearances for América de Cali, scoring 11 goals, winning six titles with the club, with his last appearance being against Independiente Medellín on 6 December 1987.

González Aquino made 17 appearances for the Paraguay national team between 1976 and 1977.

== Managerial career ==
In 1989, he was appointed the manager of Colombian side Deportivo Pereira. After stints in Paraguay with Cerro Porteño and Club Guaraní, he returned to Colombia in 1996 with Deportes Tolima.

In 2011, he managed the Paraguay under-17 national team at the that year's South American U-17 Championship. In 2015, he managed the Paraguay under-15 national team, and was their manager for the 2015 South American U-15 Championship.
