= Ricardo Gareca =

Argentine footballer and manager (born 1958)

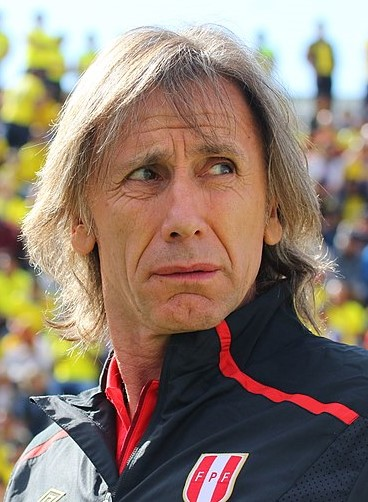
- Gareca as Peru manager in 2017

Personal information
- Full name: Ricardo Alberto Gareca Nardi
- Date of birth: 10 February 1958 (age 68)
- Place of birth: Tapiales, Argentina
- Height: 1.86 m (6 ft 1 in)
- Position: Forward

Youth career
- 1977: Boca Juniors

Senior career*
Years	Team	Apps	(Gls)
1978–1984	Boca Juniors	130	(64)
1981	→ Sarmiento (loan)	33	(13)
1985	River Plate	12	(4)
1985–1988	América de Cali	53	(31)
1989–1992	Vélez Sarsfield	118	(24)
1993–1994	Independiente	41	(11)
Total		387	(147)

International career
1981–1986	Argentina	20	(5)

Managerial career
- 1995: San Martín
- 1996–1997: Talleres
- 1997: Independiente
- 1997–2000: Talleres
- 2000: Colón
- 2001: Talleres
- 2002: Quilmes
- 2003: Argentinos Juniors
- 2005: América de Cali
- 2006: Santa Fe
- 2006: Talleres
- 2007–2008: Universitario
- 2009–2013: Vélez Sarsfield
- 2014: Palmeiras
- 2015–2022: Peru
- 2023: Vélez Sarsfield
- 2024–2025: Chile
Medal record
Men's football
Representing Peru (as manager)
Copa América
Runner-up	2019 Brazil
Bronze medal – third place	2015 Chile
- * Club domestic league appearances and goals

Ricardo Alberto Gareca Nardi (Spanish pronunciation: [riˈkaɾðo alˈβeɾto ɣaˈɾeka ˈnaɾði]; born 10 February 1958), nicknamed el Tigre and el Flaco ("Tiger " and "Slim"), is an Argentine football manager and former player. He was recently the manager of the Chile national team.

During his playing career, Gareca played for four of the most important teams in Argentina (Boca Juniors, River Plate, Vélez Sársfield and Independiente). He also had a successful experience in Colombia with América de Cali, winning two league titles and being runner-up of three Copa Libertadores.

Since 1996, Gareca has worked as a manager. He has won four league titles in Argentina (with Vélez Sarsfield); as well as a second division championship and a Copa CONMEBOL with Talleres de Córdoba.

== Playing career ==
=== Club ===
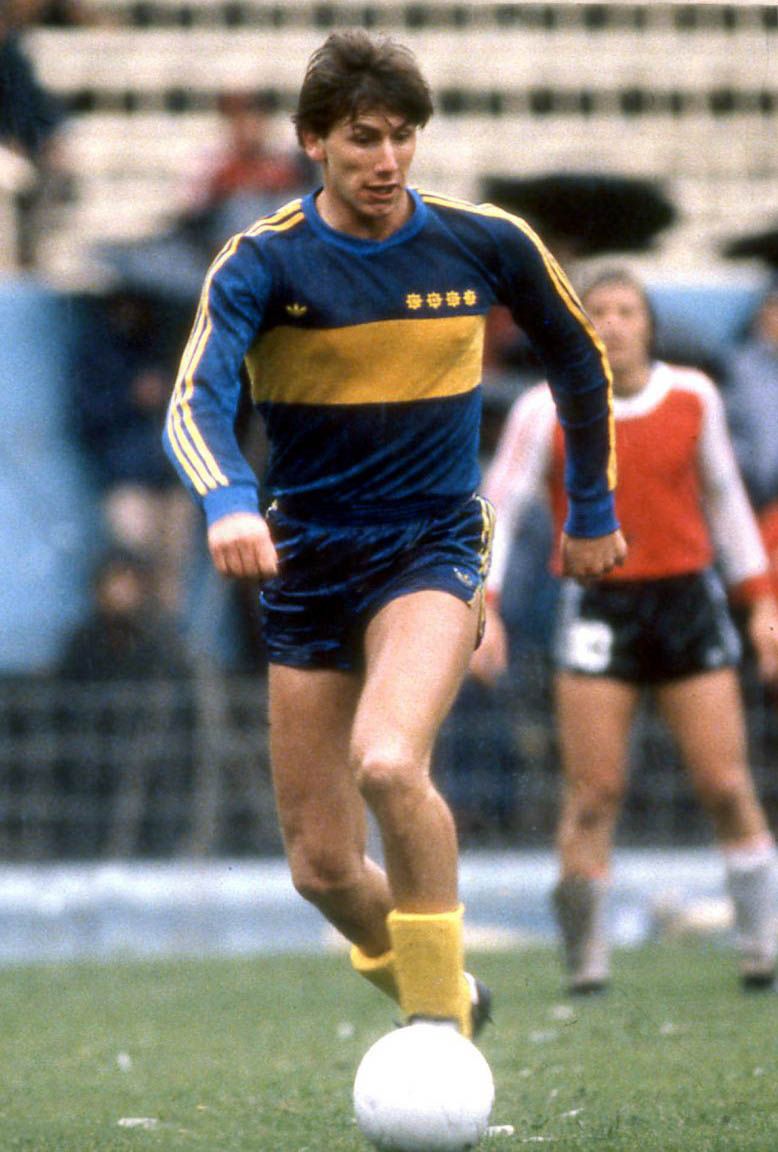
Gareca with Boca Juniors in 1980

Gareca started his professional career in 1978 with Boca Juniors, where he only played 16 games in his first three years with the club. In 1981, he was loaned out to Sarmiento for the 1981 Metropolitano, but he returned to Boca for the Nacional where he played alongside Diego Maradona, scoring 8 goals in the championship.

In 1985, Gareca earned the eternal hatred of many Boca fans for transferring directly to their fiercest rivals, River Plate, along with Oscar Ruggeri. However, unlike Ruggeri, his time with River was short, and the fans started losing that hatred, as he soon joined Colombian team América de Cali later in 1985. Gareca won two league titles with América, in 1985 and 1986. He also had the misfortune of being on the losing side of the Copa Libertadores final three times in a row (1985, 1986 and 1987). He was also the top scorer of the 1987 edition, with 7 goals. During his time at América, Gareca was almost assassinated by Pablo Escobar.

In 1989, Gareca returned to Argentina, where he played for Vélez Sársfield until 1992. In 1993, he joined Independiente for the last years of his career, making him one of a select band of players to have played for four of the most successful teams in Argentine football. While playing for Independiente he also won his first Argentine Primera División title, in the 1994 Clausura. Shortly after winning the league title, he officially retired.

=== National team ===
Gareca (right) playing for Argentina during a match against Colombia in 1984

Gareca made his debut for the Argentina national team in 1981, playing against Poland. He went on to play 20 caps for his country, scoring 5 goals, including one against the team he would eventually go to coach, Peru, which eliminated the Peruvians from reaching the 1986 FIFA World Cup and had costed Peru into a World Cup drought for 36 years.

== Coaching career ==
=== Early career in Argentina ===
Gareca started his managerial career with San Martin de Tucuman in 1995 Talleres in 1996. In 1997, he left the club to take over at Independiente, but results were not forthcoming and he returned to Talleres later that year. Gareca led Talleres to the Primera B Nacional (Argentine second division) championship in 1997–98, which earned them promotion to the Primera División. In 1999, he led them to their first major title, the Copa CONMEBOL, making them the first team in Argentina from outside the Buenos Aires and Santa Fe provinces to win an international competition. In 2000, Gareca joined Colón de Santa Fe, but soon returned to Talleres for a third spell with the club.

In 2002, the former forward took over at Quilmes in the second division, and then in 2003 he became manager of Argentinos Juniors. Having led Argentinos to the brink of promotion, the club faced a playoff against Gareca's former team Quilmes, which they lost, missing out on promotion.

=== Elche, América de Cali, Santa Fe, returning to Talleres and Universitario ===
Gareca then teamed up with former teammate Oscar Ruggeri in 2004 to work as his field assistant at Elche in Spain. In 2005, he became manager of his former club, América de Cali, followed by a spell in charge of Independiente Santa Fe, both in Colombia.

In 2006, he returned for a fourth spell with Talleres, but couldn't prevent them from struggling in the Argentine second division. In October 2007, he became the manager of Peruvian Universitario, and in July 2008 he led the team to the Torneo Apertura title.

=== Vélez Sarsfield ===
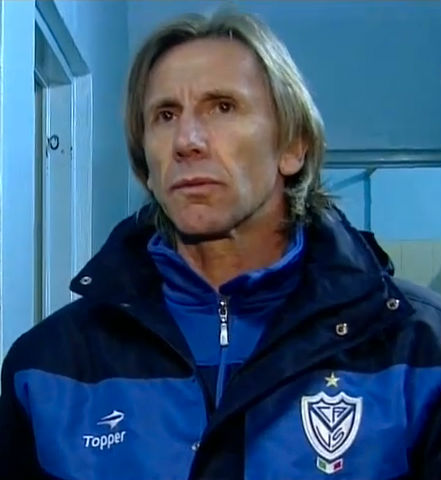
Gareca as manager of Vélez

Gareca returned to Argentina in 2009 to become manager of Vélez Sarsfield. In his first championship season with the club, he led them to the Clausura championship. Vélez lost only one of their 19 games throughout the championship. The 2010–11 season was a very successful one, as Gareca led Vélez to a runner-up finish in the Apertura, making a 43-points campaign (3 more than in their championship winning campaign of 2009), and to another championship in the Clausura. Gareca won his third league title with Vélez in 2012, helping the team obtain the 2012 Inicial.

=== Palmeiras ===
On 21 May 2014, Gareca was announced as the new manager of Brazilian side Palmeiras, signing a contract until June 2015. However, he was sacked after just three months due to Palmeiras' poor results. During that time, he was contacted by the Ghana Football Association to become coach of Ghana, but ultimately fell short to Avram Grant.

=== Peru national team ===
In February 2015, Gareca was named the manager for the Peruvian national team. At the first moment he got appointed, the decision had sparked a number of criticism among Peruvian football platforms due to the fact he was the man behind the current Peru's football crisis, blaming him for the goal that killed Peru's dream to qualify for the 1986 FIFA World Cup. Taking over shortly before the 2015 Copa América, Gareca faced a difficult task to encourage an already demoralized Peruvian team to achieve some football feat and to prove his worthiness as coach. Peru's first match under Gareca however, was a friendly defeat to Venezuela, and the pressure increased.

However, Gareca turned the struggling Peruvians around and led them to the semi-finals of the competition and eventually occupied third place. This was the repeat of the 2011 Copa América and thus he got some good credits, although skepticism remained high due to previous experience with Sergio Markarián in the 2014 World Cup qualifiers.

Gareca then led Peru in the 2018 World Cup qualifiers, but his journey was extremely rocky. Throughout seven games, Peru only managed a lone home win to Paraguay, as the team lost the others. Following the dented 0–2 away loss to minnows Bolivia, Gareca faced possible sacking, however the pressure was relieved when the Bolivians were found to have fielded ineligible player and the result was forfeited to a 3–0 win for Peru away. Although it was less meaningful at that time, Gareca was capable to utilize this lone advantage to lead a successful Peruvian resurgence in the remaining games, with the team only lost to Brazil and Chile, especially two encouraging draws to Argentina, his homeland, and a home win to Uruguay, eventually brought Peru to the playoff for the first time since 1986. On 15 November 2017, Gareca led Peru to a 2–0 on aggregate victory against New Zealand, confirming their place in the 2018 FIFA World Cup, its first ever FIFA World Cup after 36 years absence. It had been described as the greatest irony of world's football, since Gareca himself had put Peru into a World Cup drought 32 years before. Interestingly, Ricardo Gareca also shared a coincidence record with another late player and manager, Didi Pereira, who was responsible for eliminating Peru from the 1958 FIFA World Cup before rebuilding the same team to qualify for its most successful World Cup in 1970.

Between the 2018 World Cup qualifiers, Gareca's Peru participated in the Copa América Centenario held in the United States, where the team produced a successful performance, including a famous win over powerhouse Brazil, albeit in a controversial style. Gareca's Peru were then eliminated by Colombia on penalty kicks in the quarter-finals.

In the 2018 FIFA World Cup, Peru's first World Cup after 36 years, the team was grouped with France, Australia and Denmark. Peru demonstrated a brave performance, but was not lucky as the team crashed out of group stage following two defeats to Denmark and France, before grabbing a 2–0 win over Australia to gain its first three points after 40 years. France eventually conquered the 2018 World Cup.

In the 2019 Copa América, Gareca led Peru to its greatest feat in their history after 44 years, guiding the Peruvians to the final, even though its beginning had been rocky as well, with Peru securing a third-place finish to reach the quarter-finals, before outclassing Uruguay and Chile to achieve the feat. Although Peru lost the final against Brazil, it was considered a huge success, as Peru had lost 5–0 to Brazil in the group stage and hopes were low. These recent successes have helped elevate and secure Gareca's position as the manager of Peru.

After losing to the Australian national team in a playoff for one of the 32 berths in the 2022 FIFA World Cup on 13 June 2022, Gareca stated "Sometimes things don't work out. Both rivals study each other. Many things come across your mind. Why? Because of the place, the climate, one doesn't know about the temperature, apart from training towards it -- the field texture was a little fast. In that game, you need to set up right away, but we're an experienced team, we've been playing big games, and unfortunately, we had to win this game, we lost it. Arriving at a penalty shootout was not what we were expecting." After this loss, Gareca expressed his wish to remain as coach of Peru, but he wanted a bigger role in the country's sporting development. He was unable to reach an agreement with the federation and consequently he resigned as coach of the Peruvian national team.

He has been linked to a potential coaching position for Mexico, after this country's elimination from the group stage of the 2022 FIFA World Cup.

=== Return to Vélez Sarsfield ===
In March 2023, Gareca returned to Vélez Sarsfield, until December 2023.

=== Chile national team ===
On 24 January 2024 Gareca became the manager of the Chile national team. After a run that left the Chilean national team last in the 2026 CONMEBOL World Cup Qualifiers, having managed the team for 13 games with only one win in official competitions, Gareca stepped down from his managerial role on 10 June 2025.

== Personal life ==
Gareca is a practising Roman Catholic.

== Managerial statistics ==
As of match played 10 June 2025

Managerial record by team and tenure
Team	Nat	From	To	Record							
Team	Nat	From	To	G	W	D	L	GF	GA	GD	Win %
San Martín	(Argentina)	1995	1995	17	8	4	5	18	15	+3	47.06
Talleres	(Argentina)	1 January 1997	30 June 1997	28	15	10	3	48	23	+25	53.57
Independiente	(Argentina)	1 July 1997	31 December 1997	26	10	6	10	38	37	+1	38.46
Talleres	(Argentina)	1 January 1998	30 June 2000	108	41	28	39	157	148	+9	37.96
Colón	(Argentina)	1 January 2001	30 June 2001	19	6	5	8	21	27	−6	31.58
Talleres	(Argentina)	1 July 2001	15 October 2001	14	1	5	8	13	26	−13	7.14
Quilmes	(Argentina)	6 March 2002	31 December 2002	30	14	7	9	46	32	+14	46.67
Argentinos Juniors	(Argentina)	1 January 2003	17 July 2003	23	11	6	6	30	15	+15	47.83
América de Cali	(Colombia)	17 May 2005	13 September 2005	10	8	0	2	14	5	+9	80.00
Santa Fe	(Colombia)	3 March 2006	4 September 2006	28	10	7	11	40	44	−4	35.71
Talleres	(Argentina)	1 January 2007	9 April 2007	11	0	4	7	5	16	−11	0.00
Universitario de Deportes	(Peru)	29 September 2007	31 December 2008	66	29	22	15	87	67	+20	43.94
Vélez Sarsfield	(Argentina)	1 January 2009	31 December 2013	254	130	65	59	375	203	+172	51.18
Palmeiras	(Brazil)	21 May 2014	1 September 2014	13	3	1	9	9	17	−8	23.08
Peru	(Peru)	9 February 2015	14 June 2022	96	39	23	34	120	108	+12	40.63
Vélez Sarsfield	(Argentina)	8 March 2023	4 June 2023	12	1	7	4	11	13	−2	8.33
Chile	(Chile)	25 January 2024	10 June 2025	17	4	4	9	20	22	−2	23.53
Total				772	330	204	238	1,052	818	+234	42.75

== Honours ==
=== Player ===
América de Cali

- Primera A: 1985, 1986
- Copa Libertadores runner-up: 1986

Independiente

- Primera División: 1994 Clausura
- Supercopa Libertadores: 1994

=== Manager ===
Talleres

- Primera B Nacional: 1997–98
- Copa CONMEBOL: 1999

Universitario

- Torneo Apertura: 2008

Vélez Sarsfield

- Primera División: 2009 Clausura, 2011 Clausura, 2012 Inicial, 2012–13

Peru

- Copa América runner-up: 2019; third-place: 2015

== See also ==
- National team managers with 100 or more matches
