= Luis Reyes (Colombian footballer) =

Colombian footballer (born 1954)

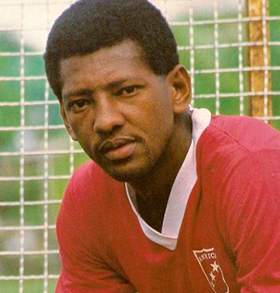

Personal information
- Date of birth: 27 January 1954 (age 72)
- Place of birth: Candelaria, Colombia
- Position: Central defender

Senior career*
Years	Team	Apps	(Gls)
1974–1986	América de Cali	396	(11)

International career
1979–1985	Colombia	20	(0)
- * Club domestic league appearances and goals

Luis Eduardo Reyes (born 27 January 1954) is a former Colombian football defender.

== Career ==
Born in Candelaria, Valle del Cauca, Reyes played club football for América de Cali. He won six Colombian league titles with América, and helped the club to three consecutive runner-up finishes in the Copa Libertadores. He scored the game-winning goal in the final game of the 1984 championship which secured the club's fourth league title.

Reyes made 20 appearances for the Colombia national football team from 1979 to 1985, and he played at the Copa América 1979.
