= 1918 Campeonato Nacional =

The 1918 Campeonato Nacional was the first official tournament of the Colombian football. It was only played by two teams from the city of Bogotá: Bartolinos, a team of the Colegio San Bartolomé, a state owned school ruled by the Jesuits, and Colombia FC. This was the only edition held for this competition, being replaced by the Categoría Primera A.

== Standings ==
Pos	Team	Pts	W	D	L	GF	GA
1	Bartolinos	2	1	0	0	3	2
2	Colombia FC	0	0	0	1	2	3

July 7, 1918

Bartolinos	3–2	Colombia FC
	Report

Bogotá

1918 Campeonato Nacional Champion
Bartolinos
First Title
