= Juan Manuel Battaglia =

Paraguayan footballer (born 1957)

Personal information
- Full name: Juan Manuel Battaglia Melgarejo
- Date of birth: 11 June 1957 (age 69)
- Place of birth: Asunción, Paraguay
- Position: Forward

Senior career*
Years	Team	Apps	(Gls)
1977	Nacional (PY)		
1977–1978	Cerro Porteño		
1979–1989	América de Cali	353	(93)
1989	Deportivo Pereira	23	(8)
1990	Cerro Porteño		

International career
1977	Paraguay U20		

Managerial career
- 2010–2011: Nacional (PY)
- 2012: Cerro Porteño PF
- 2012–2013: General Caballero
- 2013: Cerro Porteño PF
- 2013: Sol de América
- 2015–: Nacional (PY)
- * Club domestic league appearances and goals

Juan Manuel Battaglia (born 11 June 1957) is a former football midfielder and forward.

Battaglia started his career in 1977, in Paraguayan side Nacional before moving to Cerro Porteño. He then was part of a ten-year-long career at Colombian club América de Cali, from 1984 to 1989, where he helped the team win several national championships and becoming a fan-favorite.

== Titles as a player ==
- Colombian championship: 1979, 1982, 1983, 1984, 1985, 1986 (with América de Cali)
- Copa Libertadores runners-up: 1985, 1986, 1987 (with América de Cali)
