= América de Cali =

Association football club in Colombia

- Full name: América de Cali S. A.
- Nicknames: Los Diablos Rojos (The Red Devils); Los Escarlatas (The Scarlets); El Rojo (The Red); La Mechita (The Fuse); El Pentacampeón (The Five-Time Champion); La Pasión de un Pueblo (The People's Passion)
- Founded: 13 February 1927; 99 years ago (officially)
- Ground: Pascual Guerrero
- Capacity: 38,000
- Owner: Tulio Gómez
- President: Marcela Gómez
- Head coach: David González
- League: Categoría Primera A
- 2025: Primera A, 6th of 20
- Website: www.americadecali.com
Home colours	Away colours	Third colours

América de Cali S. A., best known as América de Cali or América, is a Colombian professional football club based in Cali. It competes in the Categoría Primera A, the top-flight league of Colombian football. The team plays its home games at the Estadio Olímpico Pascual Guerrero, one of the most important stadiums in the country.

The club is one of the oldest in Colombia; its foundation dates from 1927 and has its origins in the América Football Club, which was founded in 1918. It is also one of the most successful Colombian clubs, both nationally and internationally, being considered one of the strongest and most consistent clubs in the country. América has won 15 league titles and a second division tournament title, in addition to reaching the final of four Copa Libertadores (including three in a row from 1985 to 1987). Although it has never won the Copa Libertadores, it has won two international tournaments, the Copa Simón Bolívar in 1975 and the Copa Merconorte in 1999.

In 2011, América was relegated to Categoría Primera B, second division of Colombian football, for the first time in its history. They played there for five seasons, returning to the top flight after winning the Primera B championship in 2016.

América has a series of fierce rivalries, most notably with crosstown rivals Deportivo Cali. Matches between them are known as the "Clásico Vallecaucano". Other major rival clubs include Atlético Nacional, Millonarios and Independiente Santa Fe.

In 1996, América was ranked by IFFHS as the second-best football club in the world, only surpassed by Juventus of Italy. It placed 32nd in the world ranking of the best clubs of all time, according to the IFFHS, being the best-placed Colombian team in the list. It is also ranked as the best Colombian club of the 20th century and as the fifth best Colombian club so far in the 21st century. América is also credited as the second-best Colombian team in CONMEBOL club tournaments and ranks 36th in the official CONMEBOL club ranking as of 2026.

== History ==
The origins of América de Cali date to 1918, when students from the Colegio Santa Librada formed a team called América FC, to compete with other schools. That club claimed one of the first championships in the history of Colombian football by winning the Copa Centenario Batalla de Boyacá in 1919. The team broke up not long afterwards.

Over the ensuing years, various clubs in Cali appeared with various names. The most notable was Racing Club, named for the Argentine team of the same name. That club wore light blue jerseys with white vertical stripes, identical to the Argentine club. However, when the club disintegrated in 1925, the uniforms went with them.

On 13 February 1927, a new club was officially formed, with Hernán Zamorano Isaacs as its first president. They took América as their name and scarlet and white as their colors. There are various stories to explain the reason why, but both this name and those colors stuck, and América has been identified with scarlet ever since.

=== Early years ===
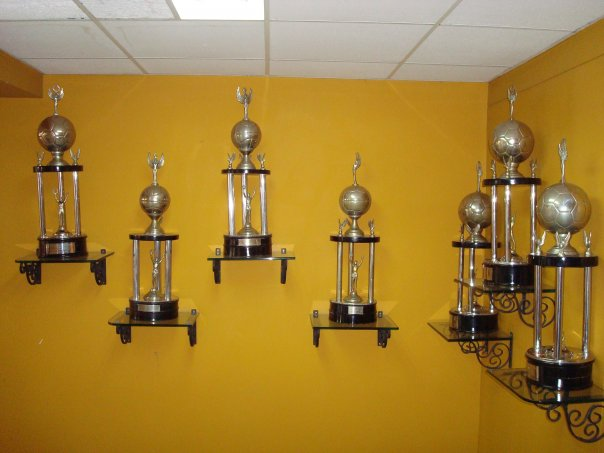
Some of America's cups

América won the 1930 Amateur Tournament, and arranged a playoff with local rivals Cali FC to determine who would enter Colombia's top league (then known as the Liga de Fútbol). Cali won 1–0 in controversial style, as two América goals were disallowed. This was part of the beginning of the birth of the fierce rivalry between América and what would become Deportivo Cali.

Unable to compete in the national tournament owing to a one-year ban handed due to their protest for the events of that match, América did set out on a long national tour in 1931, playing matches all over the country and establishing a national reputation. They spent the next decade and a half as one of Colombia's strongest teams. One of their stars was Benjamín Urrea, also known as Garabato (the scribble, or the doodle) for his small size and speed.

=== Early professional era and the Curse of Garabato ===
In 1948, the Colombian league was moving towards professionalism. Garabato, whose career was drawing to an end, was an opponent of such a move. When América elected to join the league anyway, legend has it that Garabato cursed the club, declaring that they would never be champions. As it would happen, América struggled badly in the Colombian tournament, although there were more practical reasons for this than Garabato's curse.

Financially, the club lagged behind their league rivals. This especially showed during the El Dorado period (1949–54), when Colombian clubs aggressively signed foreign players from all over South America. Unable to do the same, América fell towards the bottom of the table. During the 1950s, the club finished no higher than sixth and even sat out of the 1953 tournament due to financial reasons. They almost failed to survive the decade, and only made it because another Cali club, Boca Juniors de Cali, folded instead. In 1960, desperate to make some sort of a splash, the club signed Adolfo Pedernera as manager. Pedernera managed the club to a runner-up finish in 1961, at the time the highest position in the history of Los Diablos Rojos.

This season completely changed the dynamic of América. Although they did not contend for another championship for another six years, they were no longer in danger of folding. Towards the end of the decade, they began taking their place as one of the strongest sides in Colombia. In 1967, they enjoyed a twenty-two match unbeaten streak and finished third. In the 1968 Finalización tournament, the club finished second, and did so again in the 1969 Apertura tournament. That last season not only saw Hugo Lóndero set a Colombian record by scoring 24 goals but also qualified América for their first Copa Libertadores in history. América's first Copa Libertadores match ended in a 2–2 draw against Universidad de Chile, on 18 February 1970. Their first win came four days later, a 1–0 win at home to Chilean club Rangers.

For most of the 1970s, the club remained a solid mid-table side, with two runner-up finishes serving as the exception. The highlight came in 1976, when América won the Copa Simón Bolívar (an international tournament that included clubs from Venezuela, Bolivia, Ecuador, Peru, and Paraguay). However, they still had no Colombian championships.

=== 1979: Aquel 19 ===
In 1979, two historic changes took place at América. First, the club reconciled with Garabato. He agreed to come to the stadium, where he attended a mass with the club's directors and signed a document "officially" lifting the curse. In the meantime, they signed Gabriel Ochoa Uribe as head coach. Ochoa Uribe was one of the most recognizable names in Colombian management; he had won six championships at Millonarios, as well as another at Santa Fe. Over the course of his long stint at América (1979–91), he would transform the club into one of the dominant powers in Colombian football.

Inclined towards defensive football, Ochoa built his club around a solid back line, featuring captain Aurelio Pascuttini and Luis Eduardo Reyes. Juan Manuel Battaglia and Gerardo González Aquino played in the midfield, while Jorge Ramón Cáceres and Alfonso Cañón led the attack up front. In the 1979 Apertura, América found itself in a neck and neck race with crosstown rivals Deportivo Cali. At the end of the season, the two clubs each had 34 points. A two-legged playoff followed, but both matches ended scoreless. The Apertura title was thus determined by goal average, being won by Deportivo Cali.

The year's second tournament, the Finalización, saw América top both the first and second phases, earning a place in the final round, a four-team round robin. The round robin came down to its final match; América needed to beat Unión Magdalena to wrap up the national championship. In front of an overflow crowd, Los Escarlatas prevailed 2–0, winning their first ever title on 19 December 1979, in what would become known as "Aquel 19" (That 19th).

=== 1980s: Five consecutive titles, Copa Libertadores finals ===
1980 and 1981 were years of consolidation as the club finished third in consecutive years (while reaching the semi-finals of the 1980 Copa Libertadores). During that stretch, Ochoa refreshed the team with new arrivals, such as Argentine keeper Julio César Falcioni and strikers Roque Alfaro, Humberto Sierra and Antony de Ávila. Falcioni in particular became an anchor of América for years to come, staying in the team until 1991. De Ávila, meanwhile, played with the club until 1987 and scored a club-record 201 goals.

1982 saw all these acquisitions come together perfectly. Sierra led the league in scoring with 23 goals, while Alfaro added another 16. América won every Colombian competition that year—the Apertura, their Finalización group, and the octagonal playoff of the year's top eight teams to determine the national champion. They clinched the title in the season's final match by beating Millonarios in Bogotá.

América had won two championships with an impenetrable defense, but in the ensuing offseason, Ochoa completed an acquisition that would drastically change his side's character and strategy. Midfielder Willington Ortiz was one of the biggest stars in Colombian football, having helped Millonarios to two championships in the 1970s. By 1982, he was 30 years old, nicknamed "El Viejo Willy" (Old Willy), and still toiling away for Deportivo Cali. Although older, he had not lost a step, and was still a crafty midfielder capable of generating a sudden attack. Ochoa wanted him for his team, and in the 1982–83 offseason signed him for an unknown transfer fee.

Ortiz's arrival transformed América's style from total defense to rapid attack. They became known as La Mechita (The Fuse), and in 1983 Ortiz and Juan Manuel Battaglia combined for 40 goals. Their efforts paid off; América were able to successfully defend the title and also qualified for the semi-finals of the 1983 Copa Libertadores.

In 1984 América's midfield was strengthened by the signing of Peruvian César Cueto, a creative player nicknamed "The Left-Footed Poet" in his native country. Midfielder Álex Escobar also began regularly playing for the club. Originally a youth prospect with the club, Escobar would become a fixture in the club's midfield until 1996. With Cueto, Escobar, and Ortiz in the midfield, La Mechita marched to a third straight championship.

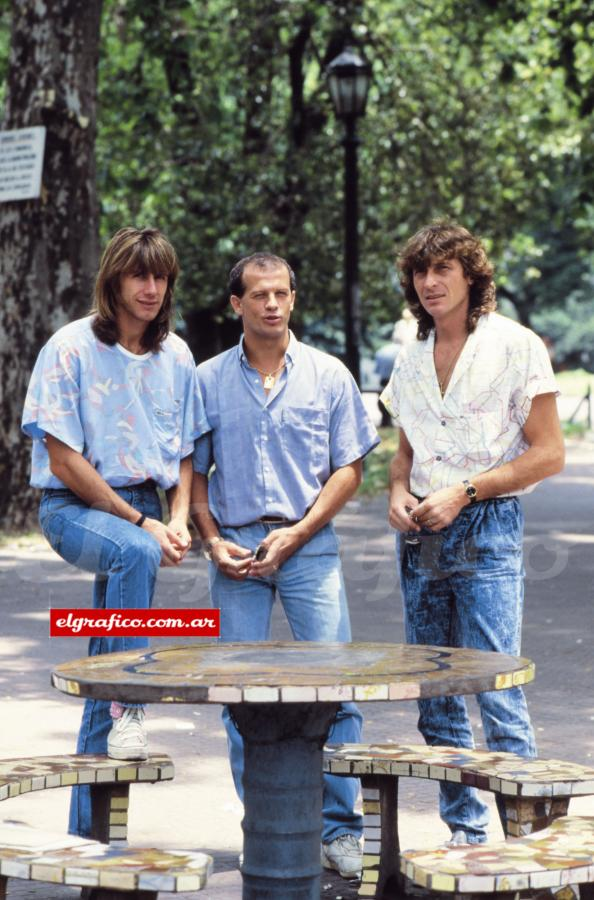
Ricardo Gareca, Carlos Ischia and Julio Falcioni, notable players for América during the 1980s

In 1985, as América set its sights on another title, Ochoa strengthened the squad again, this time by adding Paraguayan forward Roberto Cabañas and Argentine striker Ricardo Gareca. The team clinched a fourth league title in a row with a late victory over Deportivo Cali in the penultimate match. In that same year, América had a memorable Copa Libertadores run, reaching the final series of the competition for the first time. La Mechita won their first round group with an undefeated record of two wins and four draws, then topped their semi-final group to earn a place in the finals against Argentinos Juniors. The Argentine team won the first leg 1–0, but Willington Ortiz scored in the fourth minute of the second leg to power América to a 1–0 victory. This forced a decisive third match, played in Asunción. After a 1–1 tie, Argentinos won a penalty shootout to hoist the Copa Libertadores.

The 1986 season saw América set a Colombian record with an unprecedented fifth straight championship. It was another hard-fought race, but ultimately the club was able to hold off a late surge by Deportivo Cali and bring home the crown, clinching the title with a win over their crosstown rivals. Simultaneously, they were making another run through the 1986 Copa Libertadores. They topped their preliminary group (eliminating Deportivo Cali as they went) and survived a tough semi-finals group to reach the championship round for a second year in a row. There, they met Argentine powerhouse River Plate with the South American championship on the line. River won the first leg in Cali 2–1, then clinched their first Copa Libertadores title by winning 1–0 back in Buenos Aires.

1987 saw the club's ultimate heartbreak in the Copa Libertadores. Los Diablos Rojos advanced to the final for the third time in a row, earning a shot at Uruguayan giants Peñarol. América won the first leg 2–0, and then took a 1–0 lead early in the second leg. However, Peñarol rallied to win 2–1 and later defeated América 1–0 in extra time in the ensuing playoff match in Santiago with a last-minute goal by Diego Aguirre. A draw in that match would have granted América the Copa Libertadores title.

Back at home, América's grip on the domestic league finally slipped. Millonarios broke their string of five consecutive titles by winning the title in 1987, then repeating as champions in 1988. Early on, 1989 looked to be a battle between the titleholders and a revitalized América, but instead the season was interrupted by tragedy.

The 1989 league season was cancelled halfway due to the murder of referee Álvaro Ortega. The Apertura tournament had been won by América and the team was standing in third place during the second tournament. In a key match against Independiente Medellín in Medellín, they battled to a scoreless draw. Rumors that referee Álvaro Ortega had unfairly favored América spread, and later that night, Ortega was gunned down in the streets. After the match, a journalist received a call from a man claiming to be one of the murderers and blaming Ortega for the result of the game, saying "we and our patrons lost a lot of money (because of this)".

=== 1990s: Continued domestic success ===
The 1990s began with a completely different América team from the 1980s, as the backbone of the club that had won five straight championships was gone. Important players like Willington Ortiz, Ricardo Gareca, Roque Alfaro, and Humberto Sierra left in 1988. After the 1989 season, Juan Manuel Battaglia retired and Julio Falcioni returned to Argentina. La Mechita was seemingly finished.

However, they still had Ochoa as their manager, Alex Escobar in midfield and Antony de Ávila at the front. In 1990, De Ávila was joined up front by Sergio Angulo, who had previously starred with Deportivo Cali and Santa Fe, and Escobar was joined in the midfield by new acquisition Freddy Rincón, a starring midfielder on the national side. Spurred on by their near miss in the cancelled season of 1989, the club marched to the championship in 1990, winning the Apertura, the Finalización, and the playoff tournament. They were champions for the seventh time in club history.

1991 was a year of near misses. Atlético Nacional knocked América out in the quarterfinals of the Copa Libertadores, then beat them to the title in the Colombian league. After the season, Gabriel Ochoa Uribe retired as manager, ending a career that had spanned fifteen years and seven league championships. América hired an equally high-profile manager to replace him: Francisco Maturana. Maturana had won the 1989 Copa Libertadores with Atlético Nacional and guided Colombia to the knockout stages of the 1990 World Cup, then managed Real Valladolid in Spain during the 1990–91 season. He was widely expected to continue his string of successes with América.

The club won the 1992 Finalización and dominated the playoff stages, hoisting their eight championship and second in three years. In the Copa Libertadores, the 1992 edition saw them reach the semi-finals again, and earn a meeting with Newell's Old Boys. Both legs ended in a 1–1 draw, and so the match went into penalties. After a marathon round of penalties, Newell's prevailed 11–10.

In 1993, Maturana's final year with the club, the side slipped to fourth place domestically but still managed an impressive campaign in the Copa Libertadores. They became the first Colombian side to ever win at Brazil's Maracanã Stadium, beating Flamengo, and advanced all the way to the semi-finals. Once again they were denied, losing to a last-minute goal from Chile's Universidad Católica.

Maturana left at the conclusion of the season to focus on managing the Colombia national team. Nonetheless, the club's era of success continued. They remained near the top of the Colombian league in the following three seasons, and qualified for the 1996 Copa Libertadores. That year, América mounted another strong run through the tournament, charging all the way to the finals where they once again faced River Plate. Antony de Ávila scored the winning goal in the first leg, poking the ball into the net from a seemingly impossible angle. In Argentina, however, River Plate prevailed 2–0 to claim the title, thanks to a brace from Hernán Crespo.

Despite the Copa Libertadores disappointment, the 1996–97 season still brought some glory to América. Due to a format change for the Colombian league midway into the season, this was a marathon tournament lasting sixteen months (the longest in Colombian history). Despite the length and complexity of the season, Los Diablos Rojos were nonetheless able to win their ninth championship, beating Atlético Bucaramanga in the finals.

Homegrown manager Jaime de la Pava took charge in 1998, and continued the club's dominance. His first title was the 1999 Copa Merconorte, America's second international title. The following year, de la Pava led the club to its tenth title in 2000, and successfully defended the title in 2001 against Independiente Medellín and in the 2002 Apertura against rivals Nacional, a title which was seen as unexpected as América had finished eighth in the regular season and Nacional finished one point off the top spot, as well as being undefeated in the semi-finals. However, it was not long afterwards that the tide began to turn against them, and de la Pava left by mutual consent after missing out on the 2002 Finalización finals by one point.

=== The new millennium and the "Clinton List" ===
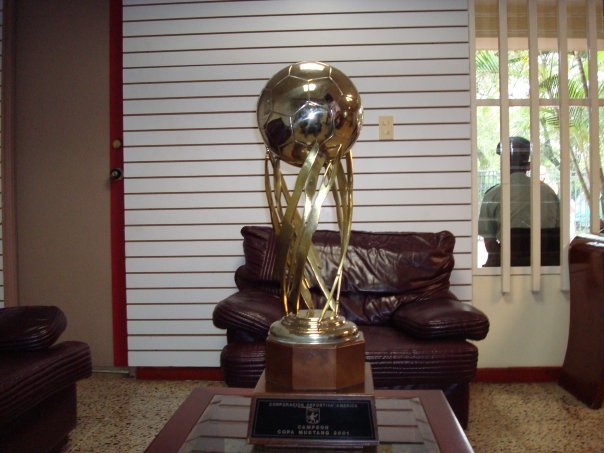
Copa Mustang 2001

Although the 1990s had seen América win three more championships, it also saw a new development that would drastically undermine the foundation of the club's success. The new problem was a direct result of América's long rumored connections to drug cartel leader Miguel Rodríguez Orejuela. The cartels had been laundering their money in the United States, and in 1995 President Bill Clinton became engaged in a new effort to stop it. He signed Executive Order 12978, which compiled a list of suspected drug cartel fronts. Under the new law, it was illegal for any American business to engage in financial transactions with these fronts. In all, over 1,000 Colombian individuals and businesses were placed on the list.

One such business was América de Cali and its board members. As a result of the club's inclusion on the list, transfer fees now needed to be paid in cash, visas for tours in the United States were denied, and any assets that the club held in American banks were frozen. Sponsorship deals collapsed, and prize money from international tournaments could not be delivered to the club, which was now entirely dependent on ticket sales for revenue.

Unable to pay competitive salaries or acquire the top talent that they had during the 1980s and 1990s, América was forced to sell many of its stars and began fading as a force in Colombian football. By 2004, the players acquired back in the club's glory days were mostly gone, and the caliber of their replacements was nowhere near the same. Although the club managed to reach the semi-finals of the 2003 Copa Libertadores, qualification to the 2005 Copa Libertadores, the finals of the 2008 Apertura tournament, and win a championship in the 2008 Finalización tournament, these were merely a blip in the club's decline. Just a year after winning the league title, America found itself bottom of the aggregate table for the 2009 season, and finished second-to-last in the Finalización tournament. Things didn't improve in the Copa Libertadores either; the team finished bottom of its group and exited the tournament without winning a single game. The 2010 season was just as bad; America failed to qualify for the playoffs in both tournaments, which worsened the club's standing in the league's relegation table.

=== Relegation and second tier (2011–2016) ===
The club's problems finally bottomed out at the end of the 2011 season when América finished second-to-last in the relegation table due to its poor results in the league since 2009 and was forced to play a relegation play-off against Patriotas, which they lost on penalties after a 2–2 aggregate score and were relegated to the Categoría Primera B for the first time on 17 December 2011, after a string of 57 seasons in the top flight.

América was expected to achieve immediate promotion back to the top flight, and they dominated the 2012 Primera B season. They were undefeated at home and beat Unión Magdalena on penalties to win the Apertura tournament. However, they performed poorly in the Torneo Finalización and failed to reach the final, and then went on to lose the season finals to Alianza Petrolera on penalties. They were then defeated 5–3 on aggregate, including a 4–1 loss at home, in a promotion play-off against Cúcuta Deportivo.

In 2013, after years of battling, the club was finally removed from the Clinton List, having been on it since 1996. 2013 was nevertheless a disappointing year for the club on the sporting front: in both tournaments América topped the table as the first seed but failed to make the finals. In 2014, they made it to the final of the Apertura tournament, but lost to Jaguares 5–2 on aggregate. The Finalización tournament was even more disappointing, as the club finished eighth in the league table, barely making the semi-finals and finishing last in their group. The following year, América took part in a special tournament organized at the start of the season to promote two teams to the top flight due to the latter's expansion to 20 clubs, but placed third in their group, and in the Primera B tournament they placed second in their semi-final group and also missed out on promotion.

In 2016, under the direction of Hernán Torres, América placed second in the first stage and qualified for the semi-finals, where they ended up in first place of their group and advanced to the finals. On 27 November, La Mechita achieved promotion to the Categoría Primera A after five seasons in the second division with a 2–1 victory against Deportes Quindío on the last matchday of the semifinal stage, thanks to goals from Ernesto Farías and Cristian Martinez Borja. In the tournament's final series, they defeated Tigres 5–1 on aggregate and won their first Primera B title.

=== Return to domestic glory ===
In its first season back to the Primera A after being promoted, and despite being in danger of relegation for most of the season, América achieved a good performance that qualified them for the Copa Sudamericana, after several seasons without international participation. The team placed seventh in the Torneo Apertura, advancing to the knockout phase, where they were eliminated by crosstown rivals Deportivo Cali in the semi-finals. In the Torneo Finalización, the team placed sixth and were eliminated again in the semi-finals, this time by Millonarios, who would eventually win the tournament against Santa Fe. In their return to international competition, they were knocked out of the 2018 Copa Sudamericana in its first round by Argentine side Defensa y Justicia after winning 1–0 in Argentina and losing the second leg in Cali by a 3–0 score.

In both tournaments of the 2019 season, América displayed a solid performance. In the Apertura tournament, the team placed fourth in the first stage and third in their semi-final group, behind eventual runners-up Deportivo Pasto and tournament favourites Millonarios, whom they beat on the last matchday thus preventing them from advancing to the final. They eventually won their fourteenth domestic league title and first in 11 years in the Finalización tournament. Under the guidance of manager Alexandre Guimarães and led by strikers Michael Rangel and Duván Vergara, with the former becoming one of the tournament's top scorers, the team placed second in the first stage and topped their semi-final group ahead of crosstown rivals Deportivo Cali, Santa Fe, and Alianza Petrolera. In the final, Los Diablos Rojos faced Junior, whom they beat 2–0 on aggregate score over two legs to win the championship and secure a return to the Copa Libertadores for its 2020 edition after an 11-year absence.

The 2020 season began with the return to the club of veteran legend Adrián Ramos, as well as América's return to the Copa Libertadores, in which their campaign began with a loss to Grêmio at home and a 2–1 win in Santiago de Chile against Universidad Católica, when both the domestic league and international competition were suspended due to the COVID-19 pandemic. The club was unable to reach an agreement with Alexandre Guimarães and the manager left the club in June upon the expiration of his contract, being replaced by Juan Cruz Real for the remainder of the season. Activity resumed in September with América losing the 2020 Superliga Colombiana to Junior. The team also failed to advance from the group stage of the Copa Libertadores, tying 1–1 with Grêmio in Porto Alegre on the last matchday due to a last-minute penalty which also prevented them from dropping to the Copa Sudamericana as they ended in last place of their group. Even with the Copa Libertadores disappointment, América went on win their fifteenth league title and second in a row by beating Santa Fe in the finals with a 3–2 aggregate score over two legs.

== Kit ==
=== Home ===
In its early years, América wore blue and white kits based on the colors of Argentinian side Racing Club. The club eventually switched to its iconic red and white colors, a switch that became permanent in 1931. According to club lore, the inspiration was a basketball game witnessed by club secretary Hernando Lenis, in which he was impressed by a basketball team nicknamed "The Red Devils". That game lives on in both the club's jersey and their nickname, Los Diablos Rojos.

=== Away ===
Throughout history, América de Cali has had several alternative uniforms, mostly white with red, although they have on occasion worn black or blue. Their best remembered alternative uniform featured red shorts with a white short. The club has also occasionally worn commemorative uniforms, such as in 1958, when they wore a similar uniform to Racing Club, in honor of their own first uniform.

=== Third ===
The club has a second alternative jersey, colored in black, that they began wearing in mid-2006.

=== Chronology ===
America de Cali Kit chronology
Season	Brand	Home	Alternatives
1918–25	No supplier		
1926	No supplier		
Official Foundation
1927	No supplier		
1927–30	No supplier		
1931–48	No supplier		
1949	No supplier		
1950–52	No supplier		
1953–54	No supplier		
1955	No supplier		
1956–57	No supplier		
1958	No supplier		
1959–84	No supplier		
1985	Adidas		
1986–87	Adidas		
1994–95	Umbro		
1995	Adidas		
1996	Nanque		
1997–98	Topper		
2000	Kappa		
2001	Kappa		
2002	Kappa		
2003	Kappa		
2004–05	Keuka		
2006	Keuka		
2007	Keuka		
2008	ASW		
2009 I	NAS		
2009 II	NAS		
2009 III	NAS		
2010	Saeta		
2011 I	Puma		
2011 II	FSS		
2012-I	FSS		
2012-II	FSS		
2013 I	FSS		
2013 II	FSS		
2014	Adidas		
2015	Adidas		
2016	Adidas		
2017	Adidas		
2018	Adidas		
2018-I	Adidas		
2018-II	Adidas		
2019-I (Provisional)	Umbro		
2019-I (Escudo con la A)	Umbro		
2019-II (Provisional) (Escudo con el diablo)	Umbro		
2019-II – 2020-I	Umbro		
2020-II	Umbro		
2021-I	Umbro		
2021-II	Umbro		
2022-I	Umbro		
2022-II	Le Coq Sportif		

== Symbols ==
The club's first crest, taken from a 1938 photo.

First devil, used in the 40s.

The wordmark used by the club

The first crest of the club was known in the mid-30s, this crest was the map of South America in reference to the name of the team that was constituted as América F.C., it was used until 1939.

The devil first appeared on the crest in 1940 because of the popular belief that the players "played like devils" on the field. During Gabriel Ochoa Uribe's twelve years with the institution, the devil was always an inconvenience for him so it was removed for religious reasons. For this reason, the crest only carried the number of stars or titles obtained by the club.

In 1992, the devil was completely removed and was only used for the administrative aspects of the institution. As a celebration of the club's 70 years, the devil was put back on the uniforms. From this date forward, any malignant beliefs regarding the devil have been completely removed. In 2007, to commemorate the club's 80 years of existence, the devil was temporarily replaced with a logo that read "80 años" (80 years) and underneath "1927–2007"; above the crest are the 13 stars obtained by the club. In 2010, the devil returned to the crest, in the shirts made by Saeta, which was the kit sponsor at the time.

As of 2017, the institutional crest without stars is presented, following the international homologation in the global professional football industry. Teams only show their badges without graphic reference to their sporting achievements.

The mascot of América de Cali is a red devil, this is because different sports journalists commented that the club's players in the 1930s looked like red devils running, so this made the club take the devil as the emblem.

América de Cali Mascot

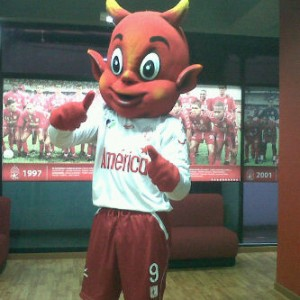
América de Cali Mascot

== Stadium ==
The team plays at the Estadio Olímpico Pascual Guerrero.

== Rivalries ==
=== América de Cali vs Deportivo Cali ===
This rivalry is known as El Clásico Vallecaucano (the Valle del Cauca derby). These teams are fierce, long-standing rivals for dominance in the city of Cali. The rivalry dates back to a local football tournament in 1931; Deportivo Cali prevailed 1–0 in a controversial game that saw two América goals disallowed. The club published a series of articles in protest and was banned from local tournaments for a year. The rivalry has only grown since then. The clubs have met 335 times, with Cali claiming 125 victories and América 104. 106 matches between the teams have been drawn.

Both teams have won 25 league titles combined and played three title deciders (Deportivo Cali won one in 1969, while América won in 1986 and 1992). Typically, between 30,000 and 35,000 fans attend this match at the stadium.

=== América de Cali vs Atlético Nacional ===
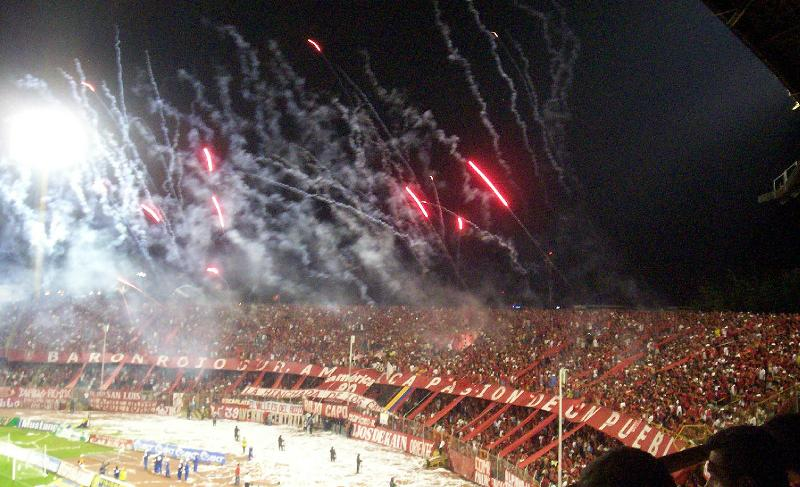
América de Cali vs Atlético Nacional for the Copa Mustang II in 2007

This rivalry, known as the Clásico Popular ("People's Classic") since it involves the two Colombian clubs with the largest fanbases, gained importance starting from the decade of the 1980s, when both América and Atlético Nacional began to stand out both in local competition and continental tournaments, and peaked between 1990 and 2002 when both teams consolidated their standing among the most powerful in Colombian football. During that stretch, the clubs met 15 times in championship finals, most recently in 2002. The clubs have also met 11 times in the Copa Libertadores and twice in the Copa Sudamericana. This is an extremely even rivalry, with América claiming 93 wins to Nacional's 98 (with 80 draws).

=== América de Cali vs Millonarios ===
This rivalry, which originated at the end of the 1970s and consolidated itself as such in the following decade, became known as the Clásico de las Estrellas since Millonarios and América were the two teams that won the most league championships (colloquially called "stars") during the era in which one championship per season was awarded (1948–2001). These two teams are among the most popular and successful in Colombia, combining for 31 league titles (16 for Millonarios and 15 for América) and having some of the largest and best organized supporters groups. The rivalry peaked in the 1980s, when seven out of the nine contested championships were won by either América (5) or Millonarios (2), with the latter cutting América's streak of five championships in a row in 1987. The two were also the main contenders in the cancelled 1989 season. This rivaly cooled in the early 2010s, due to the decline and relegation of América who were forced to play the playoff that ultimately led to that outcome after a loss to Millonarios in Bogotá, but it resurfaced with their return to the top tier and frequent matchups in final stages, with Millonarios getting the edge since then.

=== América de Cali vs Santa Fe ===
This is a minor and more recent rivalry which began to emerge during the late 1980s and early 1990s. During that time period, América made a habit of purchasing Santa Fe's best players for very low prices, and then using them to win championships. Some Santa Fe players that transferred to América are Eduardo Niño, Wílmer Cabrera, and Sergio Angulo; all of these players were part of América's 1990 league title squad. This produced bad feelings between the two sets of supporters. The rivalry's competitive peak came in 1999, when América defeated Santa Fe on penalties over two legs in the Copa Merconorte finals, whilst in 2020 they played each other in the final series of that season, which ended with América claiming their fifteenth title.

Its lowest point came on 11 May 2005, when a fight between the supporters groups left one person dead. The game was called off with América ahead 5–2 at El Campín. The rivalry remains heated today, although it is felt more on the Santa Fe side of the rivalry.

== Honours ==
América de Cali honours
Type	Competition	Titles	Seasons
Domestic	Categoría Primera A	15	1979, 1982, 1983, 1984, 1985, 1986, 1990, 1992, 1996–97, 2000, 2001, 2002–I, 2008–II, 2019–II, 2020
Domestic	Categoría Primera B	1	2016
International	Copa Merconorte	1	1999
International	Copa Simón Bolívar	1^{s}	1975
Regional	Primera Categoría Departamental	5	1931, 1932, 1933, 1934, 1935
Regional	Segunda Categoría Departamental	2	1927, 1930
Regional	Copa Centenario Batalla de Boyacá	1	1919

- record
- ^{s} shared record

=== Other honours ===
==== Friendly ====
- Torneo ESPN: 2020
- Copa Ilustre Municipalidad de Chillan: 2016
- Copa Campeones de América: 2016
- Copa Ciudad de Antofagasta: 2013
- Noche Escarlata: 2013 & 2016
- Copa Cafam: 2008, 2011
- Copa Sky: 2001
- Copa Ciudad Viña del Mar: 2000
- Copa Municipio de Andalucía: 1998
- Noche Amarilla: 1995
- Trofeo Banco de Crédito e Inversiones: 1986
- Copa Osvaldo Juan Zubeldía: 1982
- Copa Gobernación del Valle: 1979
- Trofeo del Consulado Peruano: 1947

=== Runner-up finishes ===
- Categoría Primera A
  - Runners-up (7): 1960, 1969, 1987, 1991, 1995, 1999, 2008–I
- Categoría Primera B
  - Runners-up (1): 2012
- Copa Colombia
  - Runners-up (1): 2024
- Superliga Colombiana
  - Runners-up (2): 2020, 2021
- Copa Libertadores
  - Runners-up (4): 1985, 1986, 1987, 1996

== Players ==
=== Current squad ===
As of 4 September 2026

Note: Flags indicate national team as defined under FIFA eligibility rules; some limited exceptions apply. Players may hold more than one non-FIFA nationality.

No.	Pos.	Nation	Player
1	GK	BRA	Jean Fernandes
2	DF	COL	Marlon Torres
3	DF	COL	Daniel Rosero
5	MF	COL	Josen Escobar
6	MF	COL	José Cavadía
7	FW	VEN	Jhon Murillo
9	FW	ECU	Daniel Valencia
10	MF	COL	Yeison Guzmán
12	GK	COL	Juan Pablo Montoya (on loan from Itagüí Leones)
13	DF	COL	Mateo Castillo
14	DF	COL	Marcos Mina
15	MF	COL	Rafael Carrascal (captain)
16	DF	COL	Brayan Correa
17	MF	COL	Jan Lucumí

No.	Pos.	Nation	Player
18	MF	COL	Yani Quintero (on loan from Deportes Quindío)
19	FW	COL	Jhon Tilman Palacios
20	FW	COL	Adrián Ramos
21	FW	COL	Tomás Ángel
22	DF	COL	Nicolás Hernández
23	MF	COL	Luis Quiñones
24	DF	COL	Cristian Tovar
26	DF	COL	Yhormar Hurtado
29	MF	COL	Camilo Amú
30	DF	COL	Omar Bertel
34	FW	COL	Frand Carabalí
44	DF	COL	Brayan Córdoba
47	GK	COL	Alexis Sinisterra
77	FW	VEN	Edson Tortolero (on loan from Carabobo)

=== Other players under contract ===
Note: Flags indicate national team as defined under FIFA eligibility rules; some limited exceptions apply. Players may hold more than one non-FIFA nationality.

No.	Pos.	Nation	Player
—	FW	COL	Yojan Garcés

=== Out on loan ===
Note: Flags indicate national team as defined under FIFA eligibility rules; some limited exceptions apply. Players may hold more than one non-FIFA nationality.

No.	Pos.	Nation	Player
—	MF	COL	Joel Romero (at Torreense)
—	FW	COL	Kevin Angulo (at Club Brugge)

No.	Pos.	Nation	Player
—	FW	VEN	Darwin Machís (at Carabobo)
—	FW	COL	Joider Micolta (at Deportivo Pasto)

=== World Cup players ===
The following players were chosen to represent their country at the FIFA World Cup while contracted to América de Cali.

- (Colombia) Marcos Coll (1962)
- (Colombia) Jaime González (1962)
- (Colombia) Luis Carlos Paz (1962)
- (Colombia) Rolando Serrano (1962)
- (Paraguay) Roberto Cabañas (1986)
- (Colombia) Wilmer Cabrera (1990)
- (Colombia) Alexis Mendoza (1990)
- (Colombia) Freddy Rincón (1990)
- (Colombia) Leonel Álvarez (1994)
- (Colombia) Óscar Córdoba (1994)
- (Colombia) Harold Lozano (1994)
- (Colombia) Wilson Pérez (1994)
- (Colombia) Antony de Ávila (1994)

== Club Captains ==
- (Argentina) Juan Pablo Segovia (2019–2021)
- (Colombia) Adrián Ramos (2022–2024)

== Presidents ==
List of América de Cali presidents

== Records ==
=== Most appearances ===
Rank	Name	Apps
1	(Colombia) Álex Escobar	505
2	(Colombia) Antony de Ávila	492
3	(Colombia) Luis Eduardo Reyes	396
4	(Colombia) Gilberto Cuero	389
5	(Argentina) Julio César Falcioni	376
6	(Colombia) Hugo Valencia	364
7	(Paraguay) Juan Manuel Battaglia	353
8	(Colombia) Gabriel Chaparro	340
9	(Colombia) Víctor Lugo	325
10	(Paraguay) Gerardo González Aquino	312
10	(Colombia) Foad Maziri	312

=== Top scorers ===
Rank	Name	Goals
1	(Colombia) Antony de Ávila	208
2	(Argentina) Jorge Ramón Cáceres	135
3	(Paraguay) Juan Manuel Battaglia	110
4	(Colombia) Leonardo Fabio Moreno	98
5	(Colombia) Jairo Castillo	92
6	(Colombia) Armando Torres	90
7	(Colombia) Álex Escobar	88
8	(Colombia) Orlando Maturana	79
9	(Uruguay) Jorge da Silva	77
10	(Argentina) Ricardo Gareca	74

== Managers ==
- List of América de Cali managers
