= Jaime de la Pava =

Colombian football manager

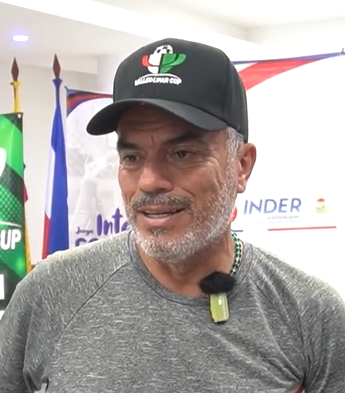
- de la Pava in 2025

Personal information
- Full name: Jaime de la Pava Márquez
- Date of birth: 14 April 1967 (age 59)
- Place of birth: Barranquilla, Colombia
- Height: 1.70 m (5 ft 7 in)

Managerial career
- Years: Team
- 1998–2002: América de Cali
- 2003: Colombia (assistant)
- 2004: Colombia U23
- 2004: Santa Fe
- 2005: Deportivo Cali
- 2006: Once Caldas
- 2007: Deportes Tolima
- 2007: Guaros
- 2008–2009: Motagua
- 2010–2011: Deportivo Cali
- 2011: Cúcuta Deportivo
- 2012: Deportivo Táchira
- 2012: Deportivo Marquense
- 2013: FAS
- 2014: Uniautónoma
- 2015–2017: Cortuluá
- 2017: Atlético Bucaramanga
- 2018: Herediano
- 2019: Atlético Venezuela
- 2020–2021: Cortuluá
- 2023: Unión Comercio
- 2023–2024: Deportivo Cali
- 2024: Royal Pari
- 2025: Llaneros
- 2026: Sport Boys

Jaime de la Pava Márquez (born 14 April 1967) is a Colombian football manager.

== Career ==
Born in Barranquilla, de la Pava began coaching football with the youth side of Deportivo Cali. De la Pava won three consecutive league titles, all of them with América de Cali in 2000, 2001, and 2002. He also won a Copa Merconorte in 1999 and a Copa Colombia with Deportivo Cali in 2010.
