= 1979 Campeonato Profesional =

Campeonato Profesional
- Season: 1979
- Champions: América de Cali (1st title)
- Matches: 367
- Goals: 917 (2.5 per match)
- Top goalscorer: Juan José Irigoyen (36)

The 1979 Campeonato Profesional was the thirty-second season of Colombia's top-flight football league. América de Cali won the league for the first time after winning the Cuadrangular final.

== Teams ==
Team	City	Stadium
América	Cali	Olímpico Pascual Guerrero
Atlético Bucaramanga	Bucaramanga	Alfonso López
Atlético Nacional	Medellín	Atanasio Girardot
Cúcuta Deportivo	Cúcuta	General Santander
Deportes Quindío	Armenia	San José de Armenia
Deportes Tolima	Ibagué	Gustavo Rojas Pinilla
Deportivo Cali	Cali	Olímpico Pascual Guerrero
Deportivo Pereira	Pereira	Hernán Ramírez Villegas
Independiente Medellín	Medellín	Atanasio Girardot
Junior	Barranquilla	Romelio Martínez
Millonarios	Bogotá	El Campín
Once Caldas	Manizales	Palogrande
Santa Fe	Bogotá	El Campín
Unión Magdalena	Santa Marta	Eduardo Santos
