= Gabriel Ochoa Uribe =

Colombian footballer and manager (1929–2020)

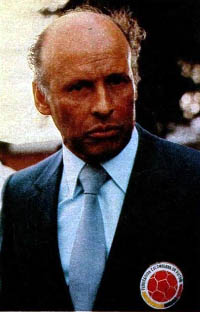
- Ochoa Uribe in 1985

Personal information
- Date of birth: November 20, 1929
- Place of birth: Sopetrán, Colombia
- Date of death: August 8, 2020 (aged 90)
- Place of death: Cali, Colombia
- Position: Goalkeeper

Senior career*
Years	Team	Apps	(Gls)
1946–1948	América de Cali		
1949–1955	Millonarios		(1)
1955–1956	America RJ		
1955–1958	Millonarios		

Managerial career
- 1958–1960: Millonarios
- 1961–1964: Millonarios
- 1963: Colombia
- 1966: Santa Fe
- 1970–1977: Millonarios
- 1979–1991: América de Cali
- 1985: Colombia
- * Club domestic league appearances and goals

Gabriel Ochoa Uribe (November 20, 1929 – August 8, 2020) was a Colombian football player and manager. He won four league titles and the Copa Colombia with Millonarios as a player and fourteen league titles as a manager, making him the most successful Colombian coach of all time.

== Playing career ==
Ochoa Uribe started his playing career at the age of 17 in 1946, his first club was América de Cali. In 1959 he joined Millonarios where he won four league titles playing alongside the great Alfredo di Stéfano. In April 1955 he moved for one year to Rio de Janeiro in Brazil not only to play for America FC but also to further his studies in sports medicine. With America FC he became under coach Martim Francisco runner up in the Championship of Rio de Janeiro. Thereafter he returned to Bogotá where he played again for Los Millonarios until 1958 when he took over as coach of the club.

== Managerial career ==
In his first two spells as manager of Millonarios, Ochoa Uribe led them to four league titles. He also had a short spell coaching the Colombia national team.

In 1966 he coached Santa Fe, leading them to the Colombian championship and making them the first Colombian team ever to reach the semi-finals of Copa Libertadores.

He returned to Millonarios between 1970 and 1977, where he won his tenth league title with the club as player and coach with the 1972 league championship.

In 1979, he became manager of América de Cali and led them to seven league championships; they were runners-up in the Copa Libertadores three times consecutively (1985, 1986, 1987). He retired in 1991.

== Honours ==
=== As player ===
Millonarios

- Colombian league championship (4): 1949, 1951, 1952, 1953
- Copa Colombia (1): 1953

=== As manager ===
Millonarios

- Colombian league championship (6): 1959, 1961, 1962, 1963, 1964, 1972

Santa Fe

- Colombian league championship (1): 1966

América de Cali

- Colombian league championship (7): 1979, 1982, 1983, 1984, 1985, 1986, 1990

== See also ==
- List of football managers with the most matches
- List of goalscoring goalkeepers
