= 1986 Campeonato Profesional =

Campeonato Profesional
- Season: 1986
- Champions: América de Cali (6th title)
- Matches: 336
- Goals: 768 (2.29 per match)
- Top goalscorer: Héctor Ramón Sosa (23)

The 1986 Campeonato Profesional was the thirty-ninth season of Colombia's top-flight football league. América de Cali won the league for the sixth time after winning the Octogonal final.

== Teams ==
| Team | City | Stadium |
|---|---|---|
| América | Cali | Olímpico Pascual Guerrero |
| Atlético Bucaramanga | Bucaramanga | Alfonso López |
| Atlético Nacional | Medellín | Atanasio Girardot |
| Cúcuta Deportivo | Cúcuta | General Santander |
| Deportes Quindío | Armenia | San José de Armenia |
| Deportes Tolima | Ibagué | Gustavo Rojas Pinilla |
| Deportivo Cali | Cali | Olímpico Pascual Guerrero |
| Deportivo Pereira | Pereira | Hernán Ramírez Villegas |
| Independiente Medellín | Medellín | Atanasio Girardot |
| Junior | Barranquilla | Romelio Martínez |
| Millonarios | Bogotá | El Campín |
| Once Caldas | Manizales | Palogrande |
| Santa Fe | Bogotá | El Campín |
| Unión Magdalena | Santa Marta | Eduardo Santos |

== Apertura ==
=== Group A ===
| Team | Pts | Goals | Goals Against | Qualified to |
|---|---|---|---|---|
| Independiente Medellín | 18 | 18 | 11 | Bonus Points |
| Millonarios | 17 | 25 | 13 | Bonus Points |
| Deportes Quindío | 17 | 21 | 11 | |
| Deportivo Cali | 13 | 14 | 17 | |
| Unión Magdalena | 13 | 13 | 21 | |
| Once Caldas | 12 | 13 | 24 | |
| Atlético Bucaramanga | 10 | 12 | 22 | |

=== Group B ===
| Team | Pts | Goals | Goals Against | Qualified to |
|---|---|---|---|---|
| Atlético Junior | 19 | 25 | 14 | Bonus Points |
| América de Cali | 18 | 28 | 14 | Bonus Points |
| Cúcuta Deportivo | 15 | 13 | 14 | |
| Atlético Nacional | 14 | 14 | 13 | |
| Santa Fe | 14 | 13 | 13 | |
| Deportivo Pereira | 14 | 16 | 19 | |
| Deportes Tolima | 2 | 7 | 29 | |

== Finalización ==
=== Round-Robin ===
| Team | Pts | Goals | Goals Against | Qualified to |
|---|---|---|---|---|
| Millonarios | 34 | 37 | 20 | Bonus Points |
| América de Cali | 33 | 41 | 25 | Bonus Points |
| Independiente Medellín | 32 | 33 | 20 | Bonus Points |
| Deportivo Cali | 31 | 34 | 25 | Bonus Points |
| Atlético Nacional | 31 | 25 | 17 | |
| Once Caldas | 30 | 37 | 26 | |
| Deportes Quindío | 29 | 35 | 27 | |
| Santa Fe | 27 | 24 | 24 | |
| Unión Magdalena | 26 | 29 | 38 | |
| Atlético Junior | 26 | 25 | 28 | |
| Atlético Bucaramanga | 25 | 32 | 36 | |
| Deportes Tolima | 19 | 23 | 33 | |
| Cúcuta Deportivo | 13 | 15 | 34 | |
| Deportivo Pereira | 8 | 14 | 51 | |

== Bonus Points ==
| Team | Apertura | Finalización | Total |
|---|---|---|---|
| Millonarios | 0.5 | 1 | 1.5 |
| Independiente Medellín | 0.75 | 0.5 | 1.25 |
| América de Cali | 0.25 | 0.75 | 1 |
| Atlético Junior | 1 | 0 | 1 |
| Deportivo Cali | 0 | 0.25 | 0.25 |

== Octogonal Final Qualifier Table ==
This table adds the results of Apertura and Finalización tables, the best 8 qualify to the finals.

| Team | Pts | Goals | Goals Against | Qualified to |
|---|---|---|---|---|
| América de Cali | 51 | 69 | 39 | Finals |
| Millonarios | 51 | 62 | 33 | Finals |
| Independiente Medellín | 50 | 51 | 31 | Finals |
| Deportes Quindío | 46 | 46 | 38 | Finals |
| Atlético Nacional | 45 | 39 | 30 | Finals |
| Atlético Junior | 45 | 50 | 42 | Finals |
| Deportivo Cali | 44 | 48 | 42 | Finals |
| Once Caldas | 42 | 50 | 50 | Finals |
| Santa Fe | 41 | 37 | 37 |
| Unión Magdalena | 39 | 42 | 59 |
| Atlético Bucaramanga | 35 | 44 | 58 |
| Cúcuta Deportivo | 28 | 28 | 48 |
| Deportivo Pereira | 22 | 30 | 70 |
| Deportes Tolima | 21 | 30 | 62 |

== Octogonal Final ==
| Team | Points Total | Bonus Points | Points in Matches | Qualified to |
|---|---|---|---|---|
| América de Cali | 22 | 1 | 21 | Champion and Copa Libertadores |
| Deportivo Cali | 20.25 | 0.25 | 20 | Runner-up and Copa Libertadores |
| Millonarios | 17.5 | 1.5 | 16 | |
| Atlético Junior | 16 | 1 | 15 | |
| Independiente Medellín | 12.25 | 1.25 | 11 | |
| Atlético Nacional | 10 | | 10 | |
| Deportes Quindío | 10 | | 10 | |
| Once Caldas | 9 | | 9 | |
