= Liga DIMAYOR =

Colombian association football league

Liga BetPlay Dimayor
- Organising body: DIMAYOR
- Founded: 15 August 1948; 78 years ago
- Country: Colombia
- Confederation: CONMEBOL
- Number of clubs: 20
- Level on pyramid: 1
- Relegation to: Torneo DIMAYOR
- Domestic cups: Copa Colombia; Superliga Colombiana
- International cup(s): Copa Libertadores; Copa Sudamericana
- Current champions: Junior (12th title) (2026–I)
- Most championships: Atlético Nacional (18 titles)
- Most appearances: Gabriel Berdugo (733)
- Top scorer: Dayro Moreno (266 goals)
- Broadcasters: Win Sports, Win+ Fútbol
- Website: dimayor.com.co
- Current: 2026 season

The Liga DIMAYOR, commonly referred to as Liga BetPlay Dimayor due to sponsorship by online betting company BetPlay, is a professional association football league in Colombia and the highest level of the Colombian football league system.

A total of twenty clubs compete in the league's regular season. División Mayor del Fútbol Profesional Colombiano, better known as DIMAYOR, organizes the competition and operates the league system of promotion and relegation for both Liga DIMAYOR and Torneo DIMAYOR leagues. Since its foundation in 1948, sixteen teams have been crowned as Colombian football champions. The most successful club is Atlético Nacional with 18 titles. The league was ranked as the 11th strongest national league in the world at the end of 2023 by the International Federation of Football History & Statistics.

== History ==
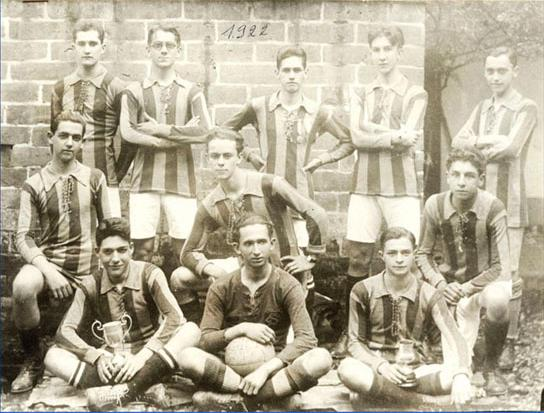
Independiente Medellín squad in 1922

Before 1948 there was no professional football league in Colombia. The first clubs were formed in Barranquilla and Bogotá: Barranquilla FC, Polo Club, Escuela Militar and Bartolinos, although the game took a while to develop in popularity. The 1918 Campeonato Nacional was the first tournament played between Colombian clubs, followed by the Copa Centenario Batalla de Boyacá. Independiente Medellín, founded on 15 April 1913, is the oldest club that remains as a professional club. The first tournament was organised by the Colombian Football Federation and DIMAYOR in 1948. Ten teams signed up for this first tournament, paying the required fee of 1,000 pesos). Two teams each signed on from Bogotá, Cali, Manizales, and Pereira, plus one from Barranquilla. 252 players were registered for that year's tournament, 182 of which were Colombians, 13 were Argentine, 8 Peruvian, 5 Uruguayan, 2 Chilean, 2 Ecuadorian, 1 Dominican, and 1 Spanish.

Soon after the league's foundation, disputes between Adefútbol (the body governing amateur football in Colombia) and DIMAYOR (the organizing body behind the new national league) erupted. DIMAYOR broke away from Adefútbol, announcing that it would operate independently of FIFA rules and regulations. In response, FIFA sanctioned Colombian football, banning the national team and all its clubs from international competition. This period, which lasted from 1949 to 1954, is known as El Dorado.

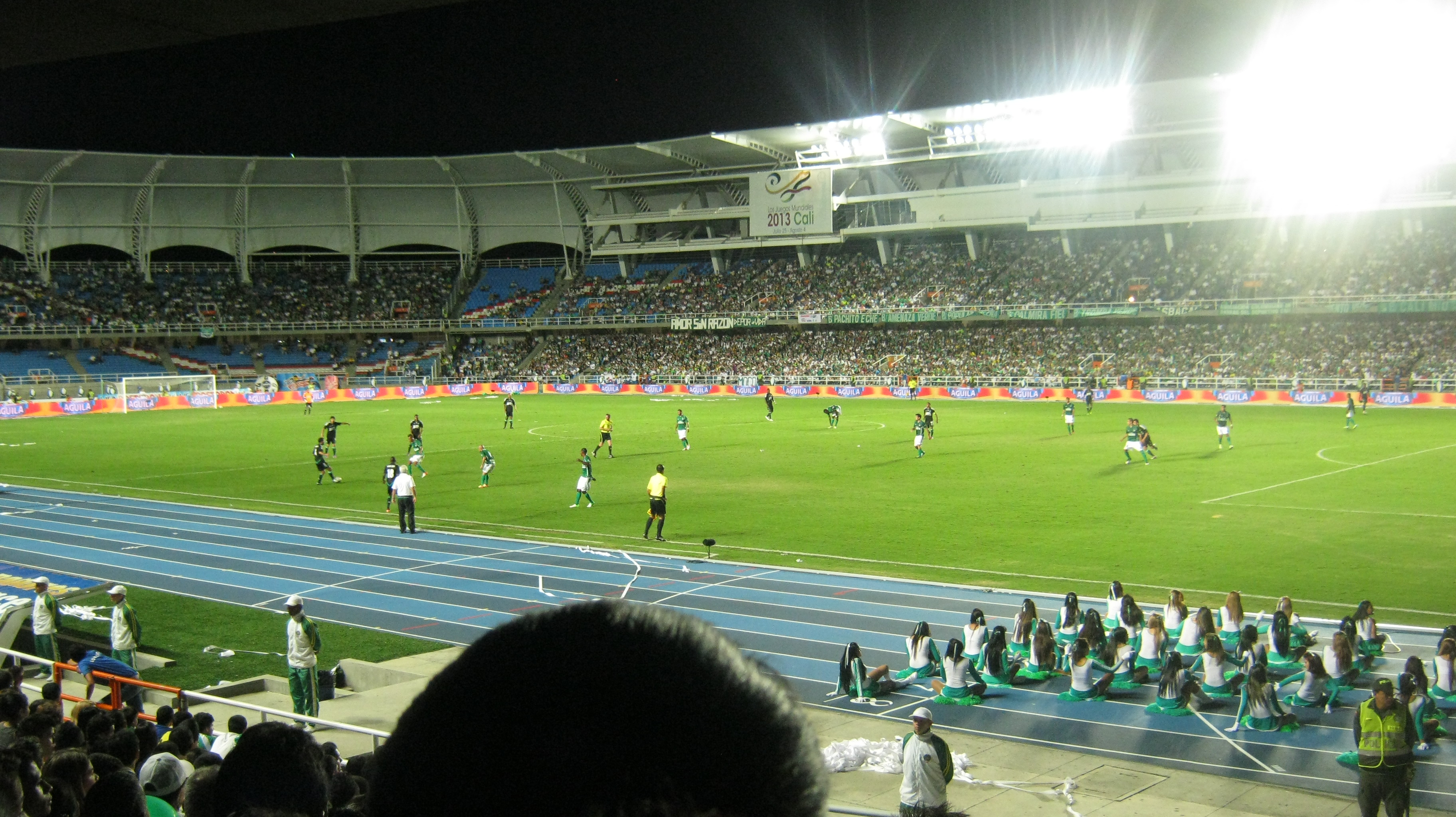
Deportivo Cali vs Atlético Nacional

Far from being a dark time in Colombian football, this was its golden age. No longer required to pay transfer fees to clubs from other nations, Colombian clubs began importing stars from all over South America and Europe. The most aggressive signer of international players was Millonarios, which won consecutive championships with stars such as Alfredo di Stéfano. Attendances boomed, and the expanding appetite for club competitions resulted in the creation of the Copa Colombia in 1950. That knockout competition was played sporadically over the next 58 years and only became an annual tournament in 2008. Although the stars returned to their nations when Colombia rejoined the international fold in 1954, the era was never forgotten.

In 1968 the league started following the pattern emerging in South America by replacing its year-long tournament with two shorter ones. From this point forward, Colombian clubs would compete in two tournaments a year; the Apertura from February to June and the Finalización from July to December, which became independent championships in 2002. Another league restructuring came in 1991, with the addition of second and third divisions. The third division had its 2002 edition cancelled for economic reasons, and stopped awarding promotion to the professional tiers in 2003 until it was finally dropped in 2010.

== Format ==
The current format of Colombian football was adopted for the 2019 season. The top flight features 20 teams, all of which play through the Apertura and Finalización tournaments each year. Both tournaments are conducted according to an identical three-stage format, and have been independent title-awarding tournaments since 2002.

The first stage is conducted on a single round-robin basis, with each team playing the other teams once for a total of 19 matches, although an extra round of regional derbies has been included in most seasons. The top eight teams then advance to a semi-final round consisting of two groups of four teams, each team playing the others in their group twice in a double round-robin format. The two group winners advance to the final, which is played in a home-and-away double-legged fashion.

Relegation to the Torneo DIMAYOR is determined by averaging the point totals achieved by teams in the first stage of the competition over the previous three seasons. Each year, the bottom two teams drop out and are replaced by the top two from the Torneo DIMAYOR.

== Current teams ==
Teams for the 2026 season

Team	City	Stadium	Capacity	Head coach	First season in Primera A	Last title
Águilas Doradas	Rionegro	Alberto Grisales	14,000	(Argentina) Flavio Robatto	2011	None
Alianza	Valledupar	Armando Maestre Pavajeau	11,000	(Colombia) Flabio Torres	2024	None
América de Cali	Cali	Pascual Guerrero	38,000	(Colombia) David González	1948	2020
Atlético Bucaramanga	Bucaramanga	Américo Montanini	28,000	(Uruguay) Pablo Peirano	1949	2024–I
Atlético Nacional	Medellín	Atanasio Girardot	44,826	(Colombia) Lucas González	1948	2024–II
Boyacá Chicó	Tunja	La Independencia	20,630	(Colombia) Jhon Jaime Gómez	2004	2008–I
Cúcuta Deportivo	Cúcuta	General Santander	42,901	(Argentina) Nicolás Chiesa	1950	2006–II
Deportes Tolima	Ibagué	Manuel Murillo Toro	28,100	(Colombia) Luis Fernando Suárez	1955	2021–I
Deportivo Cali	Cali	Deportivo Cali	42,000	(Venezuela) Rafael Dudamel	1948	2021–II
Deportivo Pasto	Pasto	Departamental Libertad	19,000	(Spain) Diego Merino	1999	2006–I
Deportivo Pereira	Pereira	Hernán Ramírez Villegas	30,297	(Colombia) Alexis Márquez	1949	2022–II
Fortaleza F.C.	Bogotá	Metropolitano de Techo	10,000	(Colombia) Diego Arias	2014	None
Independiente Medellín	Medellín	Atanasio Girardot	44,826	(Colombia) Luis Amaranto Perea	1948	2016–I
Internacional de Bogotá	Bogotá	Metropolitano de Techo	10,000	(Argentina) Ricardo Valiño	2026	None
Jaguares de Córdoba	Montería	Jaraguay	12,000	(Colombia) Julio Méndez (caretaker)	2015	None
Junior	Barranquilla	Metropolitano Roberto Meléndez	49,692	(Uruguay) Sebastián Viera	1948	2026–I
Llaneros F.C.	Villavicencio	Bello Horizonte – Rey Pelé	15,000	(Colombia) Wilmer Sandoval (caretaker)	2025	None
Millonarios	Bogotá	Nemesio Camacho	39,512	(Colombia) Alberto Gamero	1948	2023–I
Once Caldas	Manizales	Palogrande	32,000	(Colombia) Carlos Valencia (caretaker)	1948	2010–II
Santa Fe	Bogotá	Nemesio Camacho	39,512	(Uruguay) Pablo Repetto	1948	2025–I

== Seasons by club ==
This is the complete list of the clubs that have taken part in at least one Primera A season, founded in 1948, until the 2026 season. Teams that currently play are indicated in bold.

- **79** seasons: **Atlético Nacional (Atlético Municipal)**
- **79** seasons: **Millonarios**
- **79** seasons: **Santa Fe**
- **76** seasons: **Deportivo Cali**
- **75** seasons: **Independiente Medellín**
- **73** seasons: **América de Cali**
- **73** seasons: **Once Caldas (Deportes Caldas, Deportivo Manizales, Atlético Manizales, Cristal Caldas, Varta Caldas, Once Philips)**
- **71** seasons: **Deportes Tolima**
- **67** seasons: **Atlético Bucaramanga**
- **66** seasons: **Junior**
- **65** seasons: **Deportivo Pereira**
- **62** seasons: Deportes Quindío (Atlético Quindío)
- **58** seasons: **Cúcuta Deportivo**
- **53** seasons: Unión Magdalena (Samarios)
- **33** seasons: Envigado
- **27** seasons: Atlético Huila
- **26** seasons: **Deportivo Pasto**
- **20** seasons: **Boyacá Chicó (Bogotá Chicó)**
- **19** seasons: La Equidad
- **16** seasons: **Águilas Doradas (Itagüí Ditaires, Águilas Pereira, Rionegro Águilas)**
- **16** seasons: Cortuluá
- **12** seasons: Patriotas
- **12** seasons: Real Cartagena
- **11** seasons: Alianza Petrolera
- **11** seasons: **Jaguares**
- **9** seasons: Boca Juniors de Cali
- **8** seasons: Sporting
- **5** seasons: **Fortaleza**
- **5** seasons: Universidad
- **4** seasons: Once Deportivo
- **3** seasons: **Alianza**
- **3** seasons: Huracán
- **2** seasons: **Llaneros**
- **2** seasons: Uniautónoma
- **2** seasons: Unicosta
- **1** season: Deportivo Barranquilla
- **1** season: Centauros Villavicencio
- **1** season: **Internacional de Bogotá**
- **1** season: Leones
- **1** season: Libertad
- **1** season: Oro Negro
- **1** season: Tigres

== Trophy ==
The same trophy has been used to commemorate the first division champions since 1948. Made of German silver, weighing roughly 5 kilos and measuring approximately 90 centimeters tall, in its upper part it has the figure of the Winged Victory of Samothrace, which has been used to represent sporting triumph with the passing of history. The original trophy, which is engraved with the names of all the champion clubs, is kept at the headquarters of DIMAYOR and is only exhibited for fixture draws or events with sponsors, with the champions being awarded an exact replica. Along with the competition's official trophy, the champions are also awarded an additional trophy handed over by the league's sponsor. Starting from 2020, a new trophy commissioned by league sponsor BetPlay started to be presented to the champions instead of the original one.

== Players ==
=== Appearances ===
As of 13 March 2016

Rank	Player	Years	Appearances
1	(Colombia) Gabriel Berdugo	1968–1984	733
2	(Colombia) Alexis García	1980–1998	723
3	(Colombia) Arturo Segovia	1963–1979	706
4	(Colombia) Jorge Bermúdez	1989–96, 2005, 2006–07	682
5	(Colombia) Misael Flórez	1962–1981	652

=== Top scorers ===
As of 7 November 2026

Rank	Player	Years	Goals
1	(Colombia) Dayro Moreno	2003–present	266
2	(Argentina) Sergio Galván Rey	1996–2011	224
3	(Colombia) Iván Valenciano	1988–2009	217
4	(Colombia) Hugo Lóndero	1969–1981	211
5	(Argentina) Oswaldo Palavecino	1975–1985	204
6	(Colombia) Jorge Ramírez Gallego	1962–1975	201
7	(Argentina) Omar Devani	1962–1975	200
8	(Colombia) Víctor Aristizábal	1990–2007	187
9	(Colombia) Arnoldo Iguarán	1977–1997	186
10	(Colombia) Willington Ortiz	1972–1988	184

== Champions by seasons ==
The only tournament that was not awarded to a champion occurred in 1989, after the assassination of referee Álvaro Ortega on October 1 in Medellín. All games, post-season games and international representation for the following year were cancelled.

- (In bracket, title count):

Ed.	Season		Champion (title count)	Runner-up	Winning manager	Leading goalscorer(s)
1	1948		Santa Fe (1)	Junior	(Peru) Carlos Carrillo Nalda	(Argentina) Alfredo Castillo (Millonarios; 31 goals)
2	1949		Millonarios (1)	Deportivo Cali	(Argentina) Carlos Aldabe	(Argentina) Pedro Cabillón (Millonarios; 42 goals)
3	1950		Deportes Caldas (1)	Millonarios	(Argentina) Alfredo Cuezzo	(Paraguay) Casimiro Ávalos (Deportivo Pereira; 27 goals)
4	1951		Millonarios (2)	Boca Juniors	(Argentina) Adolfo Pedernera	(Argentina) Alfredo Di Stéfano (Millonarios; 31 goals)
5	1952		Millonarios (3)	Boca Juniors	(Argentina) Adolfo Pedernera	(Argentina) Alfredo Di Stéfano (Millonarios; 19 goals)
6	1953		Millonarios (4)	Atlético Quindío	(Argentina) Adolfo Pedernera	(Argentina) Mario Garelli (Atlético Quindío; 20 goals)
7	1954		Atlético Nacional (1)	Atlético Quindío	(Argentina) Fernando Paternoster	(Argentina) Carlos Alberto Gambina (Atlético Nacional; 21 goals)
8	1955		Independiente Medellín (1)	Atlético Nacional	(Paraguay) Delfín Benítez Cáceres	(Argentina) Felipe Marino (Independiente Medellín; 22 goals)
9	1956		Atlético Quindío (1)	Millonarios	(Argentina) Francisco Lombardo	(Colombia) Jaime Gutiérrez (Atlético Quindío; 21 goals)
10	1957		Independiente Medellín (2)	Deportes Tolima	(Argentina) René Seghini	(Argentina) José Vicente Grecco (Independiente Medellín; 30 goals)
11	1958		Santa Fe (2)	Millonarios	(Argentina) Julio Tocker	(Argentina) José Américo Montanini (Atlético Bucaramanga; 36 goals)
12	1959		Millonarios (5)	Independiente Medellín	(Colombia) Gabriel Ochoa Uribe	(Argentina) Felipe Marino (Cúcuta Deportivo / Independiente Medellín; 35 goals)
13	1960		Santa Fe (3)	América de Cali	(Argentina) Julio Tocker	(Argentina) Walter Marcolini (Deportivo Cali; 30 goals)
14	1961		Millonarios (6)	Independiente Medellín	(Colombia) Gabriel Ochoa Uribe	(Argentina) Alberto Perazzo (Santa Fe; 32 goals)
15	1962		Millonarios (7)	Deportivo Cali	(Colombia) Gabriel Ochoa Uribe	(Uruguay) José Omar Verdún (Cúcuta Deportivo; 36 goals)
16	1963		Millonarios (8)	Santa Fe	(Colombia) Gabriel Ochoa Uribe	(Argentina) Omar Devani (Atlético Bucaramanga; 36 goals) (Uruguay) José Omar Verdún (Cúcuta Deportivo; 36 goals)
17	1964		Millonarios (9)	Cúcuta Deportivo	(Colombia) Efraín Sánchez	(Argentina) Omar Devani (Unión Magdalena / Atlético Bucaramanga; 28 goals)
18	1965		Deportivo Cali (1)	Atlético Nacional	(Argentina) Francisco Villegas	(Argentina) Perfecto Rodríguez (Independiente Medellín; 38 goals)
19	1966		Santa Fe (4)	Independiente Medellín	(Colombia) Gabriel Ochoa Uribe	(Argentina) Omar Devani (Santa Fe; 31 goals)
20	1967		Deportivo Cali (2)	Millonarios	(Argentina) Francisco Villegas	(Argentina) José María Ferrero (Millonarios; 38 goals)
21	1968		Unión Magdalena (1)	Deportivo Cali	(Colombia) Antonio Julio de la Hoz	(Argentina) José María Ferrero (Millonarios; 32 goals)
22	1969		Deportivo Cali (3)	América de Cali	(Argentina) Francisco Villegas	(Argentina) (Colombia) Hugo Lóndero (América de Cali; 25 goals)
23	1970		Deportivo Cali (4)	Junior	(Argentina) Roberto Reskín	(Argentina) José María Ferrero (Cúcuta Deportivo; 27 goals) (Uruguay) Walter Sossa (Santa Fe; 27 goals)
24	1971		Santa Fe (5)	Atlético Nacional	(Socialist Federal Republic of Yugoslavia) Vladimir Popović	(Argentina) (Colombia) Hugo Lóndero (Cúcuta Deportivo; 30 goals) (Paraguay) Apolinar Paniagua (Deportivo Pereira; 30 goals)
25	1972		Millonarios (10)	Deportivo Cali	(Colombia) Gabriel Ochoa Uribe	(Argentina) (Colombia) Hugo Lóndero (Cúcuta Deportivo; 27 goals)
26	1973		Atlético Nacional (2)	Millonarios	(Paraguay) César López Fretes	(Uruguay) Nelson Silva Pacheco (Cúcuta Deportivo / Junior; 36 goals)
27	1974		Deportivo Cali (5)	Atlético Nacional	(Socialist Federal Republic of Yugoslavia) Vladimir Popović	(Brazil) Víctor Ephanor (Junior; 33 goals)
28	1975		Santa Fe (6)	Millonarios	(Chile) Francisco Hormazábal	(Argentina) Jorge Ramón Cáceres (Deportivo Pereira; 35 goals)
29	1976		Atlético Nacional (3)	Deportivo Cali	(Argentina) Osvaldo Zubeldía	(Argentina) Miguel Angel Converti (Millonarios; 33 goals)
30	1977		Junior (1)	Deportivo Cali	(Argentina) Juan Ramón Verón	(Argentina) Oswaldo Marcial Palavecino (Atlético Nacional; 33 goals)
31	1978		Millonarios (11)	Deportivo Cali	(Argentina) Pedro Dellacha	(Argentina) Oswaldo Marcial Palavecino (Atlético Nacional; 36 goals)
32	1979		América de Cali (1)	Santa Fe	(Colombia) Gabriel Ochoa Uribe	(Argentina) Juan José Irigoyén (Millonarios; 36 goals)
33	1980		Junior (2)	Deportivo Cali	(Argentina) José Varacka	(Argentina) Sergio Cierra (Deportivo Pereira; 26 goals)
34	1981		Atlético Nacional (4)	Deportes Tolima	(Argentina) Osvaldo Zubeldía	(Argentina) Víctor Hugo del Río (Deportes Tolima; 29 goals)
35	1982		América de Cali (2)	Deportes Tolima	(Colombia) Gabriel Ochoa Uribe	(Argentina) Miguel Oswaldo González (Atlético Bucaramanga; 27 goals)
36	1983		América de Cali (3)	Junior	(Colombia) Gabriel Ochoa Uribe	(Argentina) Hugo Gottardi (Santa Fe; 29 goals)
37	1984		América de Cali (4)	Millonarios	(Colombia) Gabriel Ochoa Uribe	(Argentina) Hugo Gottardi (Independiente Santa Fe; 23 goals)
38	1985		América de Cali (5)	Deportivo Cali	(Colombia) Gabriel Ochoa Uribe	(Argentina) Miguel Oswaldo González (Atlético Bucaramanga; 34 goals)
39	1986		América de Cali (6)	Deportivo Cali	(Colombia) Gabriel Ochoa Uribe	(Argentina) Héctor Ramón Sossa (Independiente Medellín; 23 goals)
40	1987		Millonarios (12)	América de Cali	(Colombia) Luis Augusto García	(Chile) Jorge Aravena (Deportivo Cali; 23 goals)
41	1988		Millonarios (13)	Atlético Nacional	(Colombia) Luis Augusto García	(Colombia) Sergio Angulo (Santa Fe; 29 goals)
42	1989		Championship not awarded			
43	1990		América de Cali (7)	Atlético Nacional	(Colombia) Gabriel Ochoa Uribe	(Colombia) Antony de Ávila (América de Cali; 25 goals)
44	1991		Atlético Nacional (5)	América de Cali	(Colombia) Hernán Darío Gómez	(Colombia) Iván Valenciano (Junior; 30 goals)
45	1992		América de Cali (8)	Atlético Nacional	(Colombia) Francisco Maturana	(Colombia) John Jairo Tréllez (Atlético Nacional; 25 goals)
46	1993		Junior (3)	Independiente Medellín	(Uruguay) Julio Comesaña	(Colombia) Miguel Guerrero (Junior; 34 goals)
47	1994		Atlético Nacional (6)	Millonarios	(Colombia) Juan José Peláez	(Colombia) Rubén Darío Hernández (Independiente Medellín / Deportivo Pereira / América de Cali; 32 goals)
48	1995		Junior (4)	América de Cali	(Colombia) Carlos Restrepo	(Colombia) Iván Valenciano (Junior; 24 goals)
49	1995–96		Deportivo Cali (6)	Millonarios	(Colombia) Fernando Castro	(Colombia) Iván Valenciano (Junior; 36 goals)
50	1996–97		América de Cali (9)	Atlético Bucaramanga	(Colombia) Luis Augusto García	(Colombia) Hamilton Ricard (Deportivo Cali; 36 goals)
51	1998		Deportivo Cali (7)	Once Caldas	(Colombia) José Eugenio Hernández	(Colombia) Víctor Bonilla (Deportivo Cali; 37 goals)
52	1999		Atlético Nacional (7)	América de Cali	(Colombia) Luis Fernando Suárez	(Argentina) Sergio Galván Rey (Once Caldas; 26 goals)
53	2000		América de Cali (10)	Junior	(Colombia) Jaime de la Pava	(Colombia) Carlos Alberto Castro (Millonarios; 24 goals)
54	2001		América de Cali (11)	Independiente Medellín	(Colombia) Jaime de la Pava	(Colombia) Carlos Alberto Castro (Millonarios; 29 goals) (Colombia) Jorge Horacio Serna (Independiente Medellín; 29 goals)
55	2002	Apertura	América de Cali (12)	Atlético Nacional	(Colombia) Jaime de la Pava	(Colombia) Luis Fernando Zuleta (Unión Magdalena; 13 goals)
56	2002	Finalización	Independiente Medellín (3)	Deportivo Pasto	(Colombia) Víctor Luna	(Colombia) Orlando Ballesteros (Atlético Bucaramanga; 13 goals) (Colombia) Milton Rodríguez (Deportivo Pereira; 13 goals)
57	2003	Apertura	Once Caldas (2)	Junior	(Colombia) Luis Fernando Montoya	(Colombia) Arnulfo Valentierra (Once Caldas; 13 goals)
58	2003	Finalización	Deportes Tolima (1)	Deportivo Cali	(Colombia) Luis Augusto García	(Colombia) Léider Preciado (Deportivo Cali; 17 goals)
59	2004	Apertura	Independiente Medellín (4)	Atlético Nacional	(Colombia) Pedro Sarmiento	(Colombia) Sergio Herrera (América de Cali; 13 goals)
60	2004	Finalización	Junior (5)	Atlético Nacional	(Argentina) Miguel Ángel López	(Colombia) Leonardo Fabio Moreno (América de Cali; 15 goals) (Colombia) Léider Preciado (Santa Fe; 15 goals)
61	2005	Apertura	Atlético Nacional (8)	Santa Fe	(Colombia) Santiago Escobar	(Colombia) Víctor Aristizábal (Atlético Nacional; 16 goals)
62	2005	Finalización	Deportivo Cali (8)	Real Cartagena	(Colombia) Pedro Sarmiento	(Colombia) Jámerson Rentería (Real Cartagena; 12 goals) (Colombia) Hugo Rodallega (Deportivo Cali; 12 goals)
63	2006	Apertura	Deportivo Pasto (1)	Deportivo Cali	(Argentina) Óscar Héctor Quintabani	(Colombia) Jorge Díaz Moreno (Cúcuta Deportivo; 15 goals)
64	2006	Finalización	Cúcuta Deportivo (1)	Deportes Tolima	(Colombia) Jorge Luis Pinto	(Colombia) Diego Álvarez (Independiente Medellín; 11 goals) (Colombia) Jhon Charría (Deportes Tolima; 11 goals)
65	2007	Apertura	Atlético Nacional (9)	Atlético Huila	(Argentina) Óscar Héctor Quintabani	(Colombia) Fredy Montero (Atlético Huila; 13 goals) (Argentina) Sergio Galván Rey (Atlético Nacional; 13 goals)
66	2007	Finalización	Atlético Nacional (10)	La Equidad	(Argentina) Óscar Héctor Quintabani	(Colombia) Dayro Moreno (Once Caldas; 16 goals)
67	2008	Apertura	Boyacá Chicó (1)	América de Cali	(Colombia) Alberto Gamero	(Argentina) Miguel Caneo (Boyacá Chicó; 13 goals) (Colombia) Iván Velásquez (Deportes Quindío; 13 goals)
68	2008	Finalización	América de Cali (13)	Independiente Medellín	(Colombia) Diego Umaña	(Colombia) Fredy Montero (Deportivo Cali; 16 goals)
69	2009	Apertura	Once Caldas (3)	Junior	(Colombia) Javier Álvarez	(Colombia) Teófilo Gutiérrez (Junior; 16 goals)
70	2009	Finalización	Independiente Medellín (5)	Atlético Huila	(Colombia) Leonel Álvarez	(Colombia) Jackson Martínez (Independiente Medellín; 18 goals)
71	2010	Apertura	Junior (6)	La Equidad	(Colombia) Diego Umaña	(Colombia) Carlos Bacca (Junior; 12 goals) (Colombia) Carlos Rentería (La Equidad; 12 goals)
72	2010	Finalización	Once Caldas (4)	Deportes Tolima	(Colombia) Juan Carlos Osorio	(Colombia) Wilder Medina (Deportes Tolima; 16 goals) (Colombia) Dayro Moreno (Once Caldas; 16 goals)
73	2011	Apertura	Atlético Nacional (11)	La Equidad	(Colombia) Santiago Escobar	(Colombia) Carlos Rentería (Atlético Nacional; 12 goals)
74	2011	Finalización	Junior (7)	Once Caldas	(Colombia) José Eugenio Hernández	(Colombia) Carlos Bacca (Junior; 12 goals)
75	2012	Apertura	Santa Fe (7)	Deportivo Pasto	(Colombia) Wilson Gutiérrez	(Paraguay) Robin Ramírez (Deportes Tolima; 13 goals)
76	2012	Finalización	Millonarios (14)	Independiente Medellín	(Colombia) Hernán Torres	(Colombia) Henry Hernández (Cúcuta Deportivo; 9 goals) (Colombia) Carmelo Valencia (La Equidad; 9 goals) (Argentina) Germán Cano (Independiente Medellín; 9 goals)
77	2013	Apertura	Atlético Nacional (12)	Santa Fe	(Colombia) Juan Carlos Osorio	(Colombia) Wilder Medina (Santa Fe; 12 goals)
78	2013	Finalización	Atlético Nacional (13)	Deportivo Cali	(Colombia) Juan Carlos Osorio	(Colombia) Dayro Moreno (Millonarios; 16 goals) (Colombia) Luis Carlos Ruiz (Junior; 16 goals)
79	2014	Apertura	Atlético Nacional (14)	Junior	(Colombia) Juan Carlos Osorio	(Colombia) Dayro Moreno (Millonarios; 12 goals)
80	2014	Finalización	Santa Fe (8)	Independiente Medellín	(Argentina) Gustavo Costas	(Argentina) Germán Cano (Independiente Medellín; 16 goals)
81	2015	Apertura	Deportivo Cali (9)	Independiente Medellín	(Colombia) Fernando Castro	(Colombia) Fernando Uribe (Millonarios; 15 goals)
82	2015	Finalización	Atlético Nacional (15)	Junior	(Colombia) Reinaldo Rueda	(Colombia) Jefferson Duque (Atlético Nacional; 15 goals)
83	2016	Apertura	Independiente Medellín (6)	Junior	(Colombia) Leonel Álvarez	(Colombia) Miguel Borja (Cortuluá; 19 goals)
84	2016	Finalización	Santa Fe (9)	Deportes Tolima	(Argentina) Gustavo Costas	(Colombia) Ayron del Valle (Millonarios; 12 goals)
85	2017	Apertura	Atlético Nacional (16)	Deportivo Cali	(Colombia) Reinaldo Rueda	(Colombia) Dayro Moreno (Atlético Nacional; 14 goals)
86	2017	Finalización	Millonarios (15)	Santa Fe	(Argentina) Miguel Ángel Russo	(Colombia) Yimmi Chará (Junior; 11 goals) (Colombia) Ayron del Valle (Millonarios; 11 goals) (Colombia) Dayro Moreno (Atlético Nacional; 11 goals) (Colombia) Carmelo Valencia (La Equidad; 11 goals)
87	2018	Apertura	Deportes Tolima (2)	Atlético Nacional	(Colombia) Alberto Gamero	(Argentina) Germán Cano (Independiente Medellín; 12 goals)
88	2018	Finalización	Junior (8)	Independiente Medellín	(Uruguay) Julio Comesaña	(Argentina) Germán Cano (Independiente Medellín; 20 goals)
89	2019	Apertura	Junior (9)	Deportivo Pasto	(Uruguay) Julio Comesaña	(Argentina) Germán Cano (Independiente Medellín; 21 goals)
90	2019	Finalización	América de Cali (14)	Junior	(Costa Rica) (Brazil) Alexandre Guimarães	(Argentina) Germán Cano (Independiente Medellín; 13 goals) (Colombia) Michael Rangel (América de Cali; 13 goals)
91	2020		América de Cali (15)	Santa Fe	(Argentina) Juan Cruz Real	(Colombia) Miguel Borja (Junior; 14 goals)
92	2021	Apertura	Deportes Tolima (3)	Millonarios	(Colombia) Hernán Torres	(Colombia) Jefferson Duque (Atlético Nacional; 11 goals) (Colombia) Fernando Uribe (Millonarios; 11 goals) (Colombia) Diego Herazo (La Equidad; 11 goals)
93	2021	Finalización	Deportivo Cali (10)	Deportes Tolima	(Venezuela) Rafael Dudamel	(Colombia) Harold Preciado (Deportivo Cali; 13 goals)
94	2022	Apertura	Atlético Nacional (17)	Deportes Tolima	(Colombia) Hernán Herrera	(Colombia) Dayro Moreno (Atlético Bucaramanga; 13 goals)
95	2022	Finalización	Deportivo Pereira (1)	Independiente Medellín	(Colombia) Alejandro Restrepo	(Colombia) Leonardo Castro (Deportivo Pereira; 15 goals)
96	2023	Apertura	Millonarios (16)	Atlético Nacional	(Colombia) Alberto Gamero	(Colombia) Marco Pérez (Águilas Doradas; 13 goals)
97	2023	Finalización	Junior (10)	Independiente Medellín	(Colombia) Arturo Reyes	(Colombia) Carlos Bacca (Junior; 18 goals)
98	2024	Apertura	Atlético Bucaramanga (1)	Santa Fe	(Venezuela) Rafael Dudamel	(Colombia) Carlos Bacca (Junior; 12 goals) (Colombia) Hugo Rodallega (Santa Fe; 12 goals)
99	2024	Finalización	Atlético Nacional (18)	Deportes Tolima	(Mexico) Efraín Juárez	(Colombia) Daniel Moreno (Deportivo Pasto; 17 goals)
100	2025	Apertura	Santa Fe (10)	Independiente Medellín	(Uruguay) Jorge Bava	(Colombia) Hugo Rodallega (Santa Fe; 16 goals)
101	2025	Finalización	Junior (11)	Deportes Tolima	(Uruguay) Alfredo Arias	(Argentina) Francisco Fydriszewski (Independiente Medellín; 12 goals) (Argentina) Luciano Pons (Atlético Bucaramanga; 12 goals)
102	2026	Apertura	Junior (12)	Atlético Nacional	(Uruguay) Alfredo Arias	(Colombia) Andrey Estupiñán (Deportivo Pasto; 13 goals) (Colombia) Luis Muriel (Junior; 13 goals)
103	2026	Finalización				

Source for champions and runners-up by season: RSSSF

== List of champions ==
- Teams in **bold** compete in the Liga DIMAYOR as of the 2026 season.
- Italics indicates clubs that no longer exist or were disaffiliated from Dimayor.

Rank	Club	Winners	Runners-up	Winning years	Runners-up years
1	**Atlético Nacional**	18	13	1954, 1973, 1976, 1981, 1991, 1994, 1999, 2005–I, 2007–I, 2007–II, 2011–I, 2013–I, 2013–II, 2014–I, 2015–II, 2017–I, 2022–I, 2024–II	1955, 1965, 1971, 1974, 1988, 1990, 1992, 2002–I, 2004–I, 2004–II, 2018–I, 2023–I, 2026–I
2	**Millonarios**	16	10	1949, 1951, 1952, 1953, 1959, 1961, 1962, 1963, 1964, 1972, 1978, 1987, 1988, 2012–II, 2017–II, 2023–I	1950, 1956, 1958, 1967, 1973, 1975, 1984, 1994, 1995–96, 2021–I
3	**América de Cali**	15	7	1979, 1982, 1983, 1984, 1985, 1986, 1990, 1992, 1996–97, 2000, 2001, 2002–I, 2008–II, 2019–II, 2020	1960, 1969, 1987, 1991, 1995, 1999, 2008–I
4	**Junior**	12	10	1977, 1980, 1993, 1995, 2004–II, 2010–I, 2011–II, 2018–II, 2019–I, 2023–II, 2025–II, 2026–I	1948, 1970, 1983, 2000, 2003–I, 2009–I, 2014–I, 2015–II, 2016–I, 2019–II
5	**Deportivo Cali**	10	14	1965, 1967, 1969, 1970, 1974, 1995–96, 1998, 2005–II, 2015–I, 2021–II	1949, 1962, 1968, 1972, 1976, 1977, 1978, 1980, 1985, 1986, 2003–II, 2006–I, 2013–II, 2017–I
5	**Santa Fe**	10	7	1948, 1958, 1960, 1966, 1971, 1975, 2012–I, 2014–II, 2016–II, 2025–I	1963, 1979, 2005–I, 2013–I, 2017–II, 2020, 2024–I
7	**Independiente Medellín**	6	13	1955, 1957, 2002–II, 2004–I, 2009–II, 2016–I	1959, 1961, 1966, 1993, 2001, 2008–II, 2012–II, 2014–II, 2015–I, 2018–II, 2022–II, 2023–II, 2025–I
8	**Once Caldas**	4	2	1950, 2003–I, 2009–I, 2010–II	1998, 2011–II
9	**Deportes Tolima**	3	10	2003–II, 2018–I, 2021–I	1957, 1981, 1982, 2006–II, 2010–II, 2016–II, 2021–II, 2022–I, 2024–II, 2025–II
10	**Deportivo Pasto**	1	3	2006–I	2002–II, 2012–I, 2019–I
10	Deportes Quindío	1	2	1956	1953, 1954
10	**Cúcuta Deportivo**	1	1	2006–II	1964
10	**Atlético Bucaramanga**	1	1	2024–I	1996–97
10	Unión Magdalena	1	—	1968	—
10	**Boyacá Chicó**	1	—	2008–I	—
10	**Deportivo Pereira**	1	—	2022–II	—

Source: RSSSF
