= 2020 Liga DIMAYOR =

Liga BetPlay Dimayor
- Season: 2020
- Dates: 23 January – 29 December 2020
- Champions: América de Cali (15th title)
- Relegated: Cúcuta Deportivo (disaffiliated)
- Copa Libertadores: América de Cali; Santa Fe; Junior; Atlético Nacional
- Copa Sudamericana: Deportes Tolima; La Equidad; Deportivo Pasto; Deportivo Cali
- Matches: 231
- Goals: 563 (2.44 per match)
- Top goalscorer: Miguel Borja (14 goals)
- Biggest home win: Millonarios 6–1 A. Petrolera (15 November)
- Biggest away win: Boyacá Chicó 0–3 Atlético Nacional (11 February); Jaguares 0–3 Cúcuta Deportivo (10 March)
- Highest scoring: La Equidad 3–4 Atlético Nacional (29 January); Millonarios 6–1 A. Petrolera (15 November); Millonarios 5–2 Once Caldas (27 November)

The 2020 Categoría Primera A season (officially known as the 2020 Liga BetPlay Dimayor season for sponsorship reasons) was the 73rd season of the Categoría Primera A, Colombia's top-flight football league. The season began on 23 January and concluded on 29 December 2020. América de Cali entered the season as defending champions having won the 2019 Finalización tournament, and managed to defend their title by beating Santa Fe 3–2 on aggregate in the finals, winning their fifteenth domestic league championship.

The competition was suspended from 13 March to 12 September due to the COVID-19 pandemic.

== Format ==
Prior to the COVID-19 pandemic, the league season was planned to be played as follows:

- Two tournaments per year, with three stages each. The first stage would be contested on a single round-robin basis, with each team playing the other teams once plus an additional match against a regional rival for a total of 20 games.
- Due to the 2020 Copa América scheduled to be held in the country from mid-June to mid-July, and in order to conclude the Torneo Apertura on 24 May, the second stage for this tournament would be a knockout round contested by the top four teams at the end of the first stage, with the best-placed team at the end of the first stage facing the fourth-best placed team and the second-best placed team playing the third-best placed one in a double-legged series. The Torneo Finalización would feature the semifinal stage as it was played during the previous season.
- The finals in both tournaments would be contested by the winners of each semifinal tie or group, playing a double-legged series for the championship.
- The distribution of international qualification berths as well as the relegation system would not change.

On 25 July 2020, DIMAYOR's General Assembly decided to continue playing the Torneo Apertura as the only tournament to be held in the season, with the semifinal stage originally planned for the Torneo Finalización. The allocation of international qualification berths was also altered, with the Copa Libertadores berth originally allocated to the Finalización winners going to the league runners-up, and the fourth Copa Sudamericana berth going to the winner of a play-off involving the aggregate table fourth best team not qualified for the Copa Libertadores and the 12 teams that fail to qualify for the semifinal stage. Further format changes were confirmed on 13 August 2020, with DIMAYOR's General Assembly deciding to suspend relegation for this season and postpone it until the end of the first semester of 2021, in order to ensure teams could be able to play the same number of matches as originally scheduled before the onset of the COVID-19 pandemic.

On 9 September 2020, DIMAYOR confirmed the format to be used for the remainder of the season, with the single round-robin stage started in the Torneo Apertura being resumed and played as planned and eight teams advancing out of the first stage. The semifinal stage was ultimately replaced by double-legged knockout series to decide the league champions, whilst the 12 teams that failed to qualify for the knockout stage would be sorted into three groups of four teams, with the group winners and the best group runners-up advancing to a single-legged semifinal stage and the winners of those semifinals facing each other in a single-legged final, with its winner playing against the aggregate table fourth-best placed team not qualified for the 2021 Copa Libertadores for the Colombia 4 berth to the 2021 Copa Sudamericana.

== Teams ==
20 teams took part, eighteen of them returning from last season plus Deportivo Pereira and Boyacá Chicó, who were promoted from the 2019 Primera B. Both promoted teams replaced Unión Magdalena and Atlético Huila who were relegated at the end of the previous season by having finished as the bottom two teams of the relegation table.

=== Stadia and locations ===
Locations of the 2020 Categoría Primera A teams

Team	Manager	City	Stadium	Capacity
Alianza Petrolera	(Colombia) Dayron Montesino (caretaker)	Barrancabermeja	Daniel Villa Zapata	10,400
América de Cali	(Argentina) Juan Cruz Real	Cali	Pascual Guerrero	33,130
América de Cali	(Argentina) Juan Cruz Real	Armenia	Centenario (Note: Used by América de Cali for their home match against Boyacá Chicó.)	20,716
Atlético Bucaramanga	(Uruguay) Guillermo Sanguinetti	Bucaramanga	Alfonso López	28,000
Atlético Bucaramanga	(Uruguay) Guillermo Sanguinetti	Barrancabermeja	Daniel Villa Zapata (Note: Used by Atlético Bucaramanga for their home matches against Deportivo Cali and Deportes Tolima due to Estadio Alfonso López hosting the 2020 CONMEBOL Pre-Olympic Tournament.)	10,400
Atlético Nacional	(Colombia) Alejandro Restrepo (caretaker)	Medellín	Atanasio Girardot	40,043
Boyacá Chicó	(Colombia) Belmer Aguilar	Tunja	La Independencia	20,630
Cúcuta Deportivo	(Colombia) David Suárez	Cúcuta	General Santander	42,901
Cúcuta Deportivo	(Colombia) David Suárez	Armenia	Centenario (Note: Used by Cúcuta Deportivo for their home matches from September onwards due to the poor state of the pitch of Estadio General Santander.)	20,716
Deportes Tolima	(Colombia) Hernán Torres	Ibagué	Manuel Murillo Toro	28,100
Deportes Tolima	(Colombia) Hernán Torres	Bogotá	Metropolitano de Techo (Note: Used by Deportes Tolima for their quarter-final home match against Junior due to remodeling works at Estadio Manuel Murillo Toro.)	8,000
Deportivo Cali	(Uruguay) Alfredo Arias	Palmira	Deportivo Cali	44,000
Deportivo Pasto	(Colombia) Diego Corredor	Pasto	Departamental Libertad	20,665
Deportivo Pereira	(Colombia) Alexis Márquez (caretaker)	Pereira	Hernán Ramírez Villegas	30,297
Envigado	(Spain) José Arastey	Envigado	Polideportivo Sur	11,000
Independiente Medellín	(Colombia) Humberto Sierra (caretaker)	Medellín	Atanasio Girardot	40,043
Jaguares	(Colombia) Alberto Suárez	Montería	Jaraguay	12,000
Junior	(Colombia) Luis Amaranto Perea	Barranquilla	Metropolitano Roberto Meléndez	49,692
Junior	(Colombia) Luis Amaranto Perea	Barranquilla	Romelio Martínez (Note: Used by Junior for their home matches against Rionegro Águilas, Deportivo Pasto and Alianza Petrolera.)	8,600
La Equidad	(Colombia) Alexis García	Bogotá	Metropolitano de Techo	8,000
La Equidad	(Colombia) Alexis García	Bogotá	Nemesio Camacho El Campín (Note: Used by La Equidad for their home match against Atlético Nacional for safety reasons.)	36,343
Millonarios	(Colombia) Alberto Gamero	Bogotá	Nemesio Camacho El Campín	36,343
Once Caldas	(Colombia) Hubert Bodhert	Manizales	Palogrande	28,678
Patriotas	(Spain) Abel Segovia	Tunja	La Independencia	20,630
Rionegro Águilas	(Venezuela) Francesco Stifano	Rionegro	Alberto Grisales	14,000
Santa Fe	(Colombia) Harold Rivera	Bogotá	Nemesio Camacho El Campín	36,343

=== Managerial changes ===
Team	Outgoing manager	Manner of departure	Date of vacancy	Position in table	Incoming manager	Date of appointment
La Equidad	(Colombia) Guillermo Rivera	End of caretaker spell	29 October 2019	Pre-season	(Colombia) Alexis García	7 January 2020
Millonarios	(Colombia) Jorge Luis Pinto	Resigned	5 November 2019	Pre-season	(Colombia) Alberto Gamero	3 December 2019
Atlético Bucaramanga	(Colombia) Sergio Novoa	End of caretaker spell	5 November 2019	Pre-season	(Colombia) José Manuel Rodríguez	5 November 2019
Rionegro Águilas	(Colombia) Flabio Torres	Sacked	5 November 2019	Pre-season	(Venezuela) Francesco Stifano	12 December 2019
Cúcuta Deportivo	(Uruguay) Guillermo Sanguinetti	End of contract	27 November 2019	Pre-season	(Colombia) Jairo Patiño	5 January 2020
Deportes Tolima	(Colombia) Alberto Gamero	Signed by Millonarios	3 December 2019	Pre-season	(Colombia) Hernán Torres	6 December 2019
Deportivo Pasto	(Ecuador) Octavio Zambrano	Sacked	4 December 2019	Pre-season	(Colombia) Diego Corredor	4 December 2019
Deportivo Cali	(Argentina) Lucas Pusineri	Mutual consent	7 December 2019	Pre-season	(Uruguay) Alfredo Arias	13 December 2019
Atlético Bucaramanga	(Colombia) José Manuel Rodríguez	Sacked	17 February 2020	20th	(Paraguay) Jorge Amado Nunes (caretaker)	17 February 2020
Cúcuta Deportivo	(Colombia) Jairo Patiño	Sacked	17 February 2020	16th	(Uruguay) Jorge Artigas	17 February 2020
Atlético Bucaramanga	(Paraguay) Jorge Amado Nunes	End of caretaker spell	23 February 2020	17th	(Uruguay) Guillermo Sanguinetti	22 February 2020
Jaguares	(Argentina) Juan Cruz Real	Resigned	12 March 2020	16th	(Colombia) Alberto Suárez	17 July 2020
América de Cali	(Costa Rica) Alexandre Guimarães	End of contract	14 June 2020 (Note: Contract suspended since 14 May 2020.)	8th	(Argentina) Juan Cruz Real	13 July 2020
Boyacá Chicó	(Colombia) Jhon Jaime Gómez	Sacked	2 September 2020	19th	(Colombia) Belmer Aguilar	2 September 2020
Junior	(Uruguay) Julio Comesaña	Resigned	14 September 2020	6th	(Colombia) Luis Amaranto Perea	14 September 2020
Independiente Medellín	(Paraguay) Aldo Bobadilla	Mutual consent	28 September 2020	13th	(Colombia) Javier Álvarez	2 October 2020
Deportivo Pereira	(Argentina) Néstor Craviotto	Resigned	26 October 2020	16th	(Colombia) Alexis Márquez (caretaker)	3 November 2020
Atlético Nacional	(Colombia) Juan Carlos Osorio	Sacked	1 November 2020	7th	(Colombia) Alejandro Restrepo (caretaker) (Note: Pompilio Páez was caretaker manager for the second leg of the 2020 Copa Sudamericana second stage since Alejandro Restrepo lacked a CONMEBOL license.)	5 November 2020
Cúcuta Deportivo	(Uruguay) Jorge Artigas	Resigned	3 November 2020	19th	(Colombia) David Suárez	4 November 2020
Independiente Medellín	(Colombia) Javier Álvarez	Resigned	15 November 2020	14th	(Colombia) Humberto Sierra (caretaker)	15 November 2020
Alianza Petrolera	(Colombia) César Torres	Sacked	15 November 2020	15th	(Colombia) Dayron Montesino (caretaker)	15 November 2020
Patriotas	(Colombia) Nelson Gómez	Sacked	17 November 2020	18th	(Spain) Abel Segovia	17 November 2020

== Effects of the COVID-19 pandemic ==
On 13 March 2020, after a meeting with its member clubs, DIMAYOR announced the temporary suspension of the tournament, along with the Primera B and Copa Colombia ones, due to the COVID-19 pandemic.

On 29 June, and after an Assembly of its member clubs, DIMAYOR presented a timetable for the implementation of the biosecurity protocol to resume its competitions, with COVID-19 testing for players and staff members of every club scheduled to be held from 10 to 15 July, and individual training resuming the following day. The resumption of collective training sessions, scheduled for 20 August, would be subject to government approval. According to said timetable, the league was scheduled to resume on 27 August, pending the fulfillment of the previous stages as well as final approval by the Colombian government. On 25 July, it was announced that the competition would resume on 30 August with alterations in its format, and pending government approval. With the Ministry of Health authorizing stages 4 and 5 of the biosecurity protocol (collective trainings and competition, respectively) on 20 August, and due to some adjustments to the protocol requested by DIMAYOR, that date of resumption had to be pushed back for at least two weeks, to mid-September.

On 31 August, the Ministry of Health issued the resolution that approved the adjusted protocol and greenlit the start of collective training sessions for 1 September, while President of DIMAYOR Fernando Jaramillo confirmed that the tournament would resume on 19 September, with the postponed matches Deportivo Cali vs. Millonarios and Deportivo Pasto vs. Deportes Tolima to be played on 13 and 14 September, respectively. On 3 September, DIMAYOR confirmed that the league would resume on 12 September 2020, with the postponed matches as it was planned, while the rest of clubs were notified that the ninth round of the competition would be played in the weekend of 19–20 September, with a meeting to confirm the competition format to be held on 9 September.

On 18 September, the match Atlético Nacional vs. Deportes Tolima was suspended by DIMAYOR on advice from representatives from the Ministry of Health following the confirmation of positive COVID-19 cases in the latter team and despite having authorized the team's trip to Medellín to play the match. The match was scheduled to be played in the evening of that same day, and was eventually rescheduled for 30 September.

== First stage ==
=== Standings ===
Pos	Team	Pld	W	D	L	GF	GA	GD	Pts	Qualification
1	Santa Fe	20	11	7	2	34	17	+17	40	Advance to the knockout stage
2	Deportes Tolima	20	10	7	3	30	16	+14	37	Advance to the knockout stage
3	Atlético Nacional	20	10	5	5	39	31	+8	35	Advance to the knockout stage
4	Deportivo Cali	20	8	10	2	32	23	+9	34	Advance to the knockout stage
5	Deportivo Pasto	20	9	7	4	27	19	+8	34	Advance to the knockout stage
6	Junior	20	8	9	3	27	17	+10	33	Advance to the knockout stage
7	América de Cali	20	9	6	5	31	22	+9	33	Advance to the knockout stage
8	La Equidad	20	9	5	6	30	23	+7	32	Advance to the knockout stage
9	Rionegro Águilas	20	8	7	5	27	21	+6	31	Advance to the Liguilla
10	Millonarios	20	7	9	4	29	21	+8	30	Advance to the Liguilla
11	Once Caldas	20	6	11	3	23	20	+3	29	Advance to the Liguilla
12	Envigado	20	5	8	7	22	25	−3	23	Advance to the Liguilla
13	Atlético Bucaramanga	20	5	6	9	16	26	−10	21	Advance to the Liguilla
14	Independiente Medellín	20	5	5	10	22	28	−6	20	Advance to the Liguilla
15	Alianza Petrolera	20	5	4	11	22	35	−13	19	Advance to the Liguilla
16	Deportivo Pereira	20	4	6	10	17	24	−7	18	Advance to the Liguilla
17	Jaguares	20	3	8	9	21	30	−9	17	Advance to the Liguilla
18	Patriotas	20	3	8	9	10	21	−11	17	Advance to the Liguilla
19	Boyacá Chicó	20	4	3	13	13	33	−20	15	Advance to the Liguilla
20	Cúcuta Deportivo	20	3	5	12	18	38	−20	14	Advance to the Liguilla

Source: Dimayor, Soccerway
Rules for classification: 1) Points, 2) Goal difference, 3) Goals for, 4) Away goals for, 5) Away goals against, 6) Effective time of play, 7) Drawing of lots.

=== Results ===
Home \ Away	APE	AME	BUC	NAC	BOY	CUC	TOL	CAL	PAS	PER	ENV	DIM	JAG	JUN	EQU	MIL	ONC	PAT	RIO	SFE
Alianza Petrolera	—	—	1–2	2–3	—	—	0–1	—	0–1	1–0	—	1–0	—	—	1–0	—	1–1	0–0	0–1	—
América de Cali	3–1	—	2–1	—	1–0	—	—	1–1	3–2	—	—	2–0	—	—	1–2	0–2	—	3–0	3–1	—
Atlético Bucaramanga	—	—	—	1–2	—	1–0	0–0	0–2	—	1–0	—	—	2–2	1–1	—	—	—	1–1	2–0	1–2
Atlético Nacional	—	2–2	—	—	—	3–0 (Note: Matches awarded 3–0 to América de Cali and Atlético Nacional due to Cúcuta Deportivo entering liquidation.)	1–2	2–2	1–0	2–0	3–2	1–1	1–2	2–2	—	—	—	—	—	—
Boyacá Chicó	2–2	—	1–0	0–3	—	0–2	—	—	—	0–1	—	1–0	1–0	—	—	—	1–1	1–0	1–2	—
Cúcuta Deportivo	0–2	0–3	0–1	—	—	—	0–3	3–3	0–0	—	1–0	—	—	1–4	—	1–1	—	—	—	2–3
Deportes Tolima	3–1	1–0	—	—	2–0	—	—	—	—	—	3–0	2–2	—	0–0	1–2	2–2	2–3	1–0	—	—
Deportivo Cali	2–0	2–1	—	—	3–1	—	1–2	—	—	2–2	3–0	—	—	0–0	1–0	1–1	—	—	—	3–2
Deportivo Pasto	—	—	4–0	—	2–1	—	1–3	1–1	—	—	1–0	2–1	2–0	—	1–2	—	2–1	—	—	1–1
Deportivo Pereira	—	0–1	—	—	—	2–0	0–0	—	1–1	—	1–1	—	1–0	0–2	—	0–2	1–3	—	—	1–2
Envigado	3–3	1–1	4–0	—	1–0	—	—	—	—	—	—	2–1	—	1–0	1–1	1–2	0–1	—	2–2	—
Independiente Medellín	—	—	1–0	1–3	—	4–1	—	2–3	—	1–1	—	—	1–1	—	—	1–0	1–1	3–1	2–1	—
Jaguares	1–3	2–2	—	—	—	0–3	1–1	0–0	—	—	0–0	—	—	2–2	2–0	4–1	—	—	—	1–1
Junior	2–1	1–1	—	—	3–0	—	—	—	0–1	—	—	1–0	3–2	—	2–0	1–1	0–0	—	2–1	—
La Equidad	—	—	2–1	3–4	4–0	4–1	—	—	1–1	3–3	—	1–0	—	—	—	—	2–0	1–0	0–0	—
Millonarios	6–1	—	0–0	3–0	2–1	—	—	—	1–2	—	—	—	—	—	2–2	—	1–3	1–0	0–0	0–0
Once Caldas	—	1–1	1–1	2–0	—	1–1	—	1–1	—	0–3 (Note: Match awarded 3–0 to Deportivo Pereira due to Once Caldas fielding the suspended player Elvis Mosquera. The match originally ended 2–2.)	—	—	2–1	—	—	—	—	0–0	1–1	0–0
Patriotas	—	—	—	2–1	1–1	1–1	—	0–0	1–1	1–0	0–1	—	2–0	0–0	—	—	—	—	—	0–2
Rionegro Águilas	—	—	—	2–3	—	2–1	1–1	4–1	1–1	1–0	1–1	—	2–0	—	—	—	—	3–0	—	1–0
Santa Fe	4–1	2–0	—	2–2	3–1	—	1–0	—	—	—	1–1	3–0	—	3–1	1–0	1–1	—	—	—	—

Source: Dimayor, Soccerway
Legend: Blue = home team win; Yellow = draw; Red = away team win.

== Knockout stage ==
=== Bracket ===
Quarter-finals
7	América de Cali	1	3	4
3	Atlético Nacional	2	0	2
6	Junior	1	1	2
2	Deportes Tolima	0	0	0
8	La Equidad	1	1	2
4	Deportivo Cali	1	0	1
5	Deportivo Pasto	1	0	1
1	Santa Fe	0	2	2

Semi-finals
América de Cali	0	2	2
Junior	0	1	1
La Equidad	1	1	2
Santa Fe	1	2	3

Finals
América de Cali	3	0	3
Santa Fe	0	2	2

=== Quarter-finals ===
Team 1	Agg.	Team 2	1st leg	2nd leg
Deportivo Pasto	1–2	Santa Fe	1–0	0–2
Junior	2–0	Deportes Tolima	1–0	1–0
América de Cali	4–2	Atlético Nacional	1–2	3–0
La Equidad	2–1	Deportivo Cali	1–1	1–0

==== First leg ====
21 November 2020	La Equidad	1–1	Deportivo Cali	Bogotá
17:30	Castro 89'	Report	Vásquez 2'	Stadium: Metropolitano de Techo; Attendance: 0 Referee: Wilmar Roldán

21 November 2020	América de Cali	1–2	Atlético Nacional	Cali
20:00	Ramos 38' (pen.)	Report	Duque 45+3' (pen.), 87'	Stadium: Pascual Guerrero; Attendance: 0 Referee: Edilson Ariza

22 November 2020	Junior	1–0	Deportes Tolima	Barranquilla
18:05	Borja 24'	Report		Stadium: Metropolitano Roberto Meléndez; Attendance: 0 Referee: Carlos Betancur

22 November 2020	Deportivo Pasto	1–0	Santa Fe	Pasto
20:10	Medina 16'	Report		Stadium: Departamental Libertad; Attendance: 0 Referee: John Hinestroza

==== Second leg ====
28 November 2020	Deportivo Cali	0–1 (1–2 agg.)	La Equidad	Palmira
17:30		Report	Mier 64'	Stadium: Deportivo Cali; Attendance: 0 Referee: Mario Herrera

28 November 2020	Atlético Nacional	0–3 (2–4 agg.)	América de Cali	Medellín
20:00		Report	Vergara 11'; Ramos 20', 62' (pen.)	Stadium: Atanasio Girardot; Attendance: 0 Referee: Alexander Ospina

29 November 2020	Santa Fe	2–0 (2–1 agg.)	Deportivo Pasto	Bogotá
17:30	Velásquez 12', 34'	Report		Stadium: El Campín; Attendance: 0 Referee: Carlos Betancur

29 November 2020	Deportes Tolima	0–1 (0–2 agg.)	Junior	Bogotá
20:00		Report	Borja 89' (pen.)	Stadium: Metropolitano de Techo; Attendance: 0 Referee: Wilmar Roldán

=== Semi-finals ===
Team 1	Agg.	Team 2	1st leg	2nd leg
La Equidad	2–3	Santa Fe	1–1	1–2
América de Cali	2–1	Junior	0–0	2–1

==== First leg ====
5 December 2020	La Equidad	1–1	Santa Fe	Bogotá
20:00	Sabbag 89'	Report	Velásquez 3'	Stadium: Metropolitano de Techo; Attendance: 0 Referee: Bismarks Santiago

6 December 2020	América de Cali	0–0	Junior	Cali
20:00		Report		Stadium: Pascual Guerrero; Attendance: 0 Referee: Carlos Ortega

==== Second leg ====
12 December 2020	Santa Fe	2–1 (3–2 agg.)	La Equidad	Bogotá
19:30	Ramos 25'; Cucchi 86'	Report	Salazar 68'	Stadium: El Campín; Attendance: 0 Referee: Wilmar Roldán

13 December 2020	Junior	1–2 (1–2 agg.)	América de Cali	Barranquilla
20:00	Borja 71'	Report	Sánchez 31'; Ramos 40' (pen.)	Stadium: Metropolitano Roberto Meléndez; Attendance: 0 Referee: Andrés Rojas

=== Finals ===
20 December 2020
18:00 UTC−5

América de Cali	3–0	Santa Fe
Cabrera 24'; Vergara 62'; Moreno 78'	Report

Estadio Pascual Guerrero, Cali
Attendance: 0
Referee: Carlos Ortega

27 December 2020
18:00 UTC−5

Santa Fe	2–0	América de Cali
Palacios 40'; Sambueza 45+3'	Report

Estadio El Campín, Bogotá
Attendance: 0
Referee: Wilmar Roldán

América de Cali won 3–2 on aggregate.

== Liguilla ==
=== Group stage ===
The 12 teams that failed to qualify for the knockout stages were split into three groups of four teams according to geographical criteria and played each one of their rivals once in a single round-robin tournament, with the two highest-placed teams from the first stage in each group playing two matches at home. The three group winners and the best group runners-up advanced to the semi-finals.

The fixture for the Liguilla group stage was unveiled by DIMAYOR on 23 November. Due to the liquidation of Cúcuta Deportivo, DIMAYOR decided to exclude that club from the competition and the Liguilla was played by 11 teams as a result, with one of the groups being comprised by three teams only.

==== Group A ====
Pos	Team	Pld	W	D	L	GF	GA	GD	Pts	Qualification	PER	RIO	DIM	ENV
1	Deportivo Pereira	3	2	1	0	5	3	+2	7	Advanced to the Liguilla semi-finals	—	2–2	—	—
2	Rionegro Águilas	3	1	2	0	5	4	+1	5		—	—	2–1	1–1
3	Independiente Medellín	3	1	0	2	5	4	+1	3		1–2	—	—	—
4	Envigado	3	0	1	2	1	5	−4	1		0–1	—	0–3	—

Source: Dimayor
Legend: Blue = home team win; Yellow = draw; Red = away team win.
Rules for classification: 1) Points, 2) Goal difference, 3) Goals for, 4) Away goals for, 5) Away goals against, 6) Effective time of play, 7) Drawing of lots.

==== Group B ====
Pos	Team	Pld	W	D	L	GF	GA	GD	Pts	Qualification	MIL	ONC	PAT	BOY
1	Millonarios	3	3	0	0	10	4	+6	9	Advanced to the Liguilla semi-finals	—	5–2	—	2–0
2	Once Caldas	3	2	0	1	5	5	0	6	Advanced to the Liguilla semi-finals	—	—	2–0	1–0
3	Patriotas	3	1	0	2	5	6	−1	3		2–3	—	—	—
4	Boyacá Chicó	3	0	0	3	1	6	−5	0		—	—	1–3	—

Source: Dimayor
Legend: Blue = home team win; Yellow = draw; Red = away team win.
Rules for classification: 1) Points, 2) Goal difference, 3) Goals for, 4) Away goals for, 5) Away goals against, 6) Effective time of play, 7) Drawing of lots.

==== Group C ====
Pos	Team	Pld	W	D	L	GF	GA	GD	Pts	Qualification	BUC	JAG	APE
1	Atlético Bucaramanga	2	1	1	0	3	2	+1	4	Advanced to the Liguilla semi-finals	—	—	3–2
2	Jaguares	2	0	2	0	2	2	0	2		0–0	—	—
3	Alianza Petrolera	2	0	1	1	4	5	−1	1		—	2–2	—

Source: Dimayor
Legend: Blue = home team win; Yellow = draw; Red = away team win.
Rules for classification: 1) Points, 2) Goal difference, 3) Goals for, 4) Away goals for, 5) Away goals against, 6) Effective time of play, 7) Drawing of lots.

==== Ranking of group runners-up ====
The best team among the three group runners-up qualified for the Liguilla semi-finals.

Pos	Grp	Team	Pld	W	D	L	GF	GA	GD	Pts	PPG	Result
1	B	Once Caldas	3	2	0	1	5	5	0	6	2.00	Advanced to the Liguilla semi-finals
2	A	Rionegro Águilas	3	1	2	0	5	4	+1	5	1.67	
3	C	Jaguares	2	0	2	0	4	5	−1	2	1.00	

Source: Dimayor
Rules for classification: 1) Points per game, 2) First stage placement.

=== Semi-finals ===
The teams with the best performance after the first stage and the Liguilla group stage hosted the match.

16 December 2020
19:40 UTC−5

Deportivo Pereira	1–1	Atlético Bucaramanga
Navarro 33'	Report	Herazo 19'
Penalties
Álvarez (penalty scored); Navarro (penalty scored); Lopera (penalty missed); D. Cano (penalty missed); De La Rosa (penalty missed); Córdoba (penalty scored)	3–2	(penalty missed) Herazo; (penalty scored) Torres; (penalty missed) Gutiérrez; (penalty missed) Manzano; (penalty scored) Pérez; (penalty missed) Makuka

Estadio Hernán Ramírez Villegas, Pereira
Attendance: 0
Referee: Diego Escalante

17 December 2020
19:40 UTC−5

Millonarios	0–0	Once Caldas
	Report
Penalties
Silva (penalty scored); Vargas (penalty scored); Perlaza (penalty scored); Abadía (penalty scored); De Los Santos (penalty scored); Montoya (penalty scored); Román (penalty scored)	7–6	(penalty scored) Moreno; (penalty scored) Lemos; (penalty scored) Hernández; (penalty scored) García; (penalty scored) Correa; (penalty scored) Mosquera; (penalty missed) Gómez

Estadio El Campín, Bogotá
Attendance: 0
Referee: Edilson Ariza

=== Final ===
The team with the best performance after the first stage and the previous stages of the Liguilla hosted the match.

22 December 2020
20:00 UTC−5

Millonarios	1–0	Deportivo Pereira
Salazar 32'	Report

Estadio El Campín, Bogotá
Attendance: 0
Referee: Mario Herrera

== Aggregate table ==
Pos	Team	Pld	W	D	L	GF	GA	GD	Pts	Qualification
1	Santa Fe	26	14	8	4	41	23	+18	50	Qualification for Copa Libertadores group stage
2	América de Cali (C)	26	12	7	7	40	27	+13	43	Qualification for Copa Libertadores group stage
3	Junior	24	10	10	4	30	19	+11	40	Qualification for Copa Libertadores second stage
4	Atlético Nacional	22	11	5	6	41	35	+6	38	Qualification for Copa Libertadores second stage
5	Deportes Tolima	22	10	7	5	30	18	+12	37	Qualification for Copa Sudamericana first stage
6	La Equidad	24	10	7	7	34	27	+7	37	Qualification for Copa Sudamericana first stage
7	Deportivo Pasto	22	10	7	5	28	21	+7	37	Qualification for Copa Sudamericana first stage
8	Deportivo Cali (O)	22	8	11	3	33	25	+8	35	Qualification for Copa Sudamericana play-off
9	Rionegro Águilas	20	8	7	5	27	21	+6	31	
10	Millonarios	20	7	9	4	29	21	+8	30	Qualification for Copa Sudamericana play-off (Note: Qualified for the Copa Sudamericana play-off as Liguilla winners.)
11	Once Caldas	20	6	11	3	23	20	+3	29	
12	Envigado	20	5	8	7	22	25	−3	23	
13	Atlético Bucaramanga	20	5	6	9	16	26	−10	21	
14	Independiente Medellín	20	5	5	10	22	28	−6	20	
15	Alianza Petrolera	20	5	4	11	22	35	−13	19	
16	Deportivo Pereira	20	4	6	10	17	24	−7	18	
17	Jaguares	20	3	8	9	21	30	−9	17	
18	Patriotas	20	3	8	9	10	21	−11	17	
19	Boyacá Chicó	20	4	3	13	13	33	−20	15	
20	Cúcuta Deportivo (D)	20	3	5	12	18	38	−20	14	Disaffiliated from DIMAYOR (Note: Cúcuta Deportivo was disaffiliated from DIMAYOR on 25 November 2020 due to the club's liquidation.)

Source: Dimayor
Rules for classification: 1) Points, 2) Goal difference, 3) Goals for, 4) Away goals for, 5) Away goals against, 6) Effective time of play, 7) Drawing of lots.
(C) Champions; (D) Disqualified; (O) Play-off winners

== Copa Sudamericana play-off ==
The Liguilla winners played the aggregate table fourth best team not qualified for the 2021 Copa Libertadores in a single match for the Colombia 4 berth in the 2021 Copa Sudamericana. The match was hosted by the aggregate table fourth best team not qualified for the Copa Libertadores.

29 December 2020
18:30 UTC−5

Deportivo Cali	1–1	Millonarios
Palavecino 63'	Report	Salazar 37'
Penalties
Vásquez (penalty scored); Valencia (penalty scored); Andrade (penalty scored); Palavecino (penalty scored)	4–3	(penalty scored) Quiñones; (penalty scored) Guerra; (penalty missed) Román; (penalty scored) Godoy; (penalty missed) Abadía

Estadio Deportivo Cali, Palmira
Attendance: 0
Referee: Alexander Ospina

== Top goalscorers ==
Rank	Name	Club	Goals
1	(Colombia) Miguel Borja	Junior	14
2	(Colombia) Jáder Obrian	Rionegro Águilas	13
3	(Colombia) Cristian Arango	Millonarios	10
3	(Uruguay) Matías Mier	La Equidad	10
3	(Argentina) Agustín Palavecino	Deportivo Cali	10
6	(Colombia) Jefferson Duque	Atlético Nacional	9
6	(Colombia) Diego Herazo	Atlético Bucaramanga	9
6	(Colombia) Adrián Ramos	América de Cali	9
9	(Colombia) Andrés Andrade	Atlético Nacional	7
9	(Colombia) Ayron del Valle	Millonarios	7
9	(Colombia) Jorge Luis Ramos	Santa Fe	7
9	(Colombia) Pablo Sabbag	La Equidad	7

Source: Soccerway

== Relegation ==
A separate table is kept to determine the teams that get relegated to the Categoría Primera B for the next season. This table is elaborated from a sum of all first stage games played for the current season and the previous two seasons. For purposes of elaborating the table, promoted teams are given the same point and goal tallies as the team in the 18th position at the start of the season.

Due to the COVID-19 pandemic, no teams were relegated at the end of this season, with relegation being postponed until the end of the first semester of 2021 in order to ensure teams could be able to play the same number of matches as originally scheduled.

Pos	Team	2018 Pts	2019 Pts	2020 Pts	Total Pld	Total GF	Total GA	Total GD	Total Pts
1	Deportes Tolima	72	64	37	98	137	84	53	173
2	Atlético Nacional	71	66	35	98	143	97	46	172
3	Deportivo Cali	58	67	34	98	133	97	36	159
4	Junior	62	63	33	98	118	77	41	158
5	Independiente Medellín	69	59	20	98	145	120	25	148
6	Once Caldas	63	56	29	98	120	98	22	148
7	Millonarios	51	67	30	98	125	104	21	148
8	América de Cali	47	67	33	98	127	119	8	147
9	Santa Fe	56	46	40	98	120	85	35	142
10	La Equidad	61	42	32	98	111	99	12	135
11	Rionegro Águilas	57	40	31	98	108	119	–11	128
12	Atlético Bucaramanga	58	46	21	98	103	119	–16	125
13	Deportivo Pasto	35	54	34	98	96	98	–2	123
14	Envigado	46	47	23	98	106	120	–14	116
15	Alianza Petrolera	42	55	20	98	102	126	–23	116
16	Patriotas	49	50	17	98	83	116	–33	116
17	Cúcuta Deportivo	42	59	14	98	117	152	–35	115
18	Deportivo Pereira	39	38	18	98	77	137	–60	95
19	Jaguares	39	38	17	98	81	143	–62	94
20	Boyacá Chicó	39	38	15	98	73	146	–73	92

Source: Dimayor
Rules for classification: 1st points; 2nd goal difference; 3rd goals scored; 4th away goals scored.

== Awards ==
=== Team of the year ===
Team of the Year
Goalkeeper	(Uruguay) Sebastián Viera (Junior)			
Defenders	(Colombia) Walmer Pacheco (La Equidad)		(Colombia) Jeison Palacios (Santa Fe)	(Colombia) Edwin Velasco (América de Cali)
Midfielders	(Argentina) Fabián Sambueza (Santa Fe)	(Argentina) Agustín Palavecino (Deportivo Cali)	(Colombia) Andrés Andrade (Atlético Nacional)	(Uruguay) Matías Mier (La Equidad)
Forwards	(Colombia) Adrián Ramos (América de Cali)		(Colombia) Duván Vergara (América de Cali)	(Colombia) Miguel Borja (Junior)

== See also ==
- 2020 Categoría Primera B season
- 2020 Copa Colombia
