= 2019 Categoría Primera A season =

72nd season of Colombia's top-flight football league

Liga Águila
- Season: 2019
- Dates: 25 January – 7 December 2019
- Champions: Apertura: Junior (9th title); Finalización: América de Cali (14th title)
- Relegated: Unión Magdalena; Atlético Huila
- Copa Libertadores: Junior; América de Cali; Deportes Tolima; Independiente Medellín (cup winners)
- Copa Sudamericana: Deportivo Cali; Atlético Nacional; Millonarios; Deportivo Pasto
- Matches: 452
- Goals: 1,008 (2.23 per match)
- Top goalscorer: Apertura: Germán Cano (21 goals); Finalización: Germán Cano and Michael Rangel (13 goals each)
- Biggest home win: Millonarios 4–0 U. Magdalena (28 February); U. Magdalena 4–0 Patriotas (6 April); Ind. Medellín 4–0 Atl. Bucaramanga (13 April); Atlético Nacional 4–0 Patriotas (18 April); Once Caldas 4–0 Deportivo Cali (24 April); Envigado 4–0 Atlético Nacional (30 April); América de Cali 4–0 U. Magdalena (30 April); Deportivo Cali 4–0 Jaguares (20 July); Deportes Tolima 4–0 Santa Fe (4 August); Deportivo Pasto 4–0 Atlético Huila (20 August); Atl. Bucaramanga 4–0 Jaguares (18 October)
- Biggest away win: Jaguares 0–4 Deportes Tolima (2 March); Atl. Huila 1–5 Deportes Tolima (17 March)
- Highest scoring: U. Magdalena 3–4 Jaguares (26 January); Atlético Nacional 5–2 Ind. Medellín (25 August); Deportes Tolima 5–2 Deportivo Cali (3 October)

The 2019 Categoría Primera A season (officially known as the 2019 Liga Águila season for sponsorship reasons) was the 72nd season of Colombia's top-flight football league. The season began on 25 January and concluded on 7 December. Junior entered the season as defending champions having won the 2018 Finalización tournament and successfully defended the title in the Torneo Apertura, beating Deportivo Pasto 5–4 on penalties after a 1–1 draw on aggregate to claim their ninth domestic league title on 12 June. Junior's winning streak was stopped in the Torneo Finalización by América de Cali, who won their fourteenth Primera A title and first since 2008 on 7 December by defeating the defending champions 2–0 on aggregate in the finals.

== Format ==
For this season, the league was played as follows:

- Two tournaments per year, with three stages each. The first stage was contested on a single round-robin basis, with each team playing the other teams once plus an additional match against a regional rival for a total of 20 games. The regional derby matchday in the first stage of both tournaments, which was not played in the previous season, returned for this season.
- The knockout round was replaced by a semifinal stage to be played by the top eight teams after the end of the first stage, which were split into two groups of four with each team playing the others in their group twice. The top two teams from the first stage were seeded in each group, whilst the remaining six teams were drawn into each group.
- The finals were contested by the winners of each semifinal group, playing a double-legged series for the championship.
- The distribution of international qualification berths as well as the relegation system were the same as last season.

== Teams ==
20 teams competed, eighteen of them returning from last season plus Cúcuta Deportivo and Unión Magdalena, who were promoted from the 2018 Primera B. Both promoted teams replaced Boyacá Chicó and Leones who were relegated at the end of the previous season.

=== Stadia and locations ===
Locations of the 2019 Categoría Primera A teams

Team	Manager	Home city	Stadium	Capacity
Alianza Petrolera	(Colombia) César Torres	Barrancabermeja	Daniel Villa Zapata	10,400
América de Cali	(Costa Rica) Alexandre Guimarães	Cali	Pascual Guerrero	33,130
Atlético Bucaramanga	(Colombia) Sergio Novoa (caretaker)	Bucaramanga	Alfonso López	28,000
Atlético Huila	(Colombia) Dayron Pérez (caretaker)	Neiva	Guillermo Plazas Alcid	22,000
Atlético Nacional	(Colombia) Juan Carlos Osorio	Medellín	Atanasio Girardot	40,043
Cúcuta Deportivo	(Uruguay) Guillermo Sanguinetti	Cúcuta	General Santander	42,901
Deportes Tolima	(Colombia) Alberto Gamero	Ibagué	Manuel Murillo Toro^{a}	28,100
Deportivo Cali	(Argentina) Lucas Pusineri	Cali	Deportivo Cali	52,000
Deportivo Pasto	(Ecuador) Octavio Zambrano	Pasto	Municipal de Ipiales^{b}	6,000
Envigado	(Spain) José Arastey (caretaker)	Envigado	Polideportivo Sur	11,000
Independiente Medellín	(Paraguay) Aldo Bobadilla	Medellín	Atanasio Girardot	40,043
Jaguares	(Argentina) Juan Cruz Real	Montería	Jaraguay	12,000
Junior	(Uruguay) Julio Comesaña	Barranquilla	Metropolitano Roberto Meléndez	49,692
La Equidad	(Colombia) Guillermo Rivera (caretaker)	Bogotá	Metropolitano de Techo	8,000
Millonarios	(Colombia) Jorge Luis Pinto	Bogotá	Nemesio Camacho El Campín	36,343
Once Caldas	(Colombia) Hubert Bodhert	Manizales	Palogrande	28,678
Patriotas	(Colombia) Nelson Gómez	Tunja	La Independencia	20,630
Rionegro Águilas	(Colombia) Flabio Torres	Rionegro	Alberto Grisales	14,000
Santa Fe	(Colombia) Harold Rivera	Bogotá	Nemesio Camacho El Campín	36,343
Unión Magdalena	(Colombia) Carlos Silva	Santa Marta	Sierra Nevada	16,000

a: Deportes Tolima played their Torneo Apertura home match against Rionegro Águilas at Estadio Metropolitano de Techo in Bogotá due to maintenance works at their regular stadium Estadio Manuel Murillo Toro.
b: Deportivo Pasto temporarily played their home matches at Estadio Municipal de Ipiales in Ipiales due to remodeling works at Estadio Departamental Libertad.

=== Managerial changes ===
Team	Outgoing manager	Manner of departure	Date of vacancy	Position in table	Incoming manager	Date of appointment
Torneo Apertura
Millonarios	(Argentina) Miguel Ángel Russo	Mutual consent	11 November 2018	Pre-season	(Colombia) Jorge Luis Pinto	13 November 2018
Deportivo Cali	(Uruguay) Gerardo Pelusso	Mutual consent	11 November 2018	Pre-season	(Argentina) Lucas Pusineri	2 December 2018
Deportivo Pasto	(Colombia) Jairo Enríquez	End of caretaker spell	11 November 2018	Pre-season	(Colombia) Alexis García	28 November 2018
Jaguares	(Colombia) Julio Méndez	End of caretaker spell	11 November 2018	Pre-season	(Colombia) John Jairo Bodmer	12 November 2018
Atlético Bucaramanga	(Colombia) Óscar Serrano	End of caretaker spell	21 November 2018	Pre-season	(Colombia) Flabio Torres	21 November 2018
Cúcuta Deportivo	(Argentina) Lucas Pusineri	Signed by Deportivo Cali	2 December 2018	Pre-season	(Argentina) Sebastián Méndez	24 December 2018
Junior	(Uruguay) Julio Comesaña	End of contract	19 December 2018	Pre-season	(Colombia) Luis Fernando Suárez	21 December 2018
La Equidad	(Colombia) Luis Fernando Suárez	Signed by Junior	20 December 2018	Pre-season	(Colombia) Humberto Sierra	26 December 2018
Santa Fe	(Uruguay) Guillermo Sanguinetti	Mutual consent	10 February 2019	20th	(Colombia) Gerardo Bedoya	10 February 2019 (Note: Originally as caretaker manager, appointed on a permanent basis on 23 February 2019.)
Atlético Bucaramanga	(Colombia) Flabio Torres	Sacked	18 February 2019	19th	(Colombia) Carlos Giraldo	18 February 2019
Rionegro Águilas	(Colombia) Jorge Luis Bernal	Mutual consent	1 March 2019	20th	(Colombia) Sergio Guzmán (caretaker)	1 March 2019
Rionegro Águilas	(Colombia) Sergio Guzmán	End of caretaker spell	11 March 2019	20th	(Paraguay) Ever Hugo Almeida	11 March 2019
Jaguares	(Colombia) John Jairo Bodmer	Resigned	14 March 2019	17th	(Colombia) Óscar Upegui	15 March 2019
Atlético Huila	(Colombia) Dayron Pérez	Mutual consent	18 March 2019	18th	(Colombia) Luis Fernando Herrera	19 March 2019
Rionegro Águilas	(Paraguay) Ever Hugo Almeida	Resigned	4 April 2019	20th	(Colombia) Eduardo Cruz (caretaker)	4 April 2019
Independiente Medellín	(Ecuador) Octavio Zambrano	Sacked	5 April 2019	13th	(Colombia) Ricardo Calle (caretaker)	5 April 2019
América de Cali	(Colombia) Fernando Castro	Sacked	15 April 2019	5th	(Colombia) Jersson González (caretaker)	15 April 2019
Atlético Bucaramanga	(Colombia) Carlos Giraldo	Sacked	23 April 2019	13th	(Colombia) Óscar Serrano (caretaker)	24 April 2019
Junior	(Colombia) Luis Fernando Suárez	Sacked	3 May 2019	4th	(Colombia) Luis Grau (caretaker)	3 May 2019
Junior	(Colombia) Luis Grau	End of caretaker spell	5 May 2019	7th	(Uruguay) Julio Comesaña	5 May 2019
Independiente Medellín	(Colombia) Ricardo Calle	End of caretaker spell	5 May 2019	9th	(Colombia) Alexis Mendoza	14 May 2019
Atlético Bucaramanga	(Colombia) Óscar Serrano	End of caretaker spell	8 May 2019	17th	(Colombia) Hernán Torres	9 May 2019
Cúcuta Deportivo	(Argentina) Sebastián Méndez	Mutual consent	8 May 2019	11th	(Argentina) Pablo Garabello	10 May 2019
Santa Fe	(Colombia) Gerardo Bedoya	Replaced	8 May 2019	20th	(Argentina) Patricio Camps	12 April 2019 (Note: In charge since June 2019.)
Atlético Nacional	(Brazil) Paulo Autuori	Resigned	24 May 2019	4th, Group B	(Colombia) Alejandro Restrepo (caretaker)	24 May 2019
Torneo Finalización
América de Cali	(Colombia) Jersson González	End of caretaker spell	5 June 2019	Pre-tournament	(Costa Rica) Alexandre Guimarães	13 June 2019
Atlético Nacional	(Colombia) Alejandro Restrepo	End of caretaker spell	5 June 2019	Pre-tournament	(Colombia) Juan Carlos Osorio	10 June 2019
Unión Magdalena	(Colombia) Harold Rivera	Mutual consent	5 June 2019	Pre-tournament	(Colombia) Pedro Sarmiento	12 June 2019
Rionegro Águilas	(Colombia) Eduardo Cruz	End of caretaker spell	12 June 2019	Pre-tournament	(Colombia) Flabio Torres	12 June 2019
Santa Fe	(Argentina) Patricio Camps	Mutual consent	7 August 2019	20th	(Colombia) Harold Rivera	7 August 2019
Cúcuta Deportivo	(Argentina) Pablo Garabello	Mutual consent	13 August 2019	9th	(Uruguay) Guillermo Sanguinetti	14 August 2019
Atlético Huila	(Colombia) Luis Fernando Herrera	Sacked	13 August 2019	11th	(Colombia) Jorge Luis Bernal	15 August 2019
Jaguares	(Colombia) Óscar Upegui	Resigned	27 August 2019	16th	(Colombia) John Jairo Bodmer (caretaker)	27 August 2019
La Equidad	(Colombia) Humberto Sierra	Resigned	31 August 2019	19th	(Colombia) Guillermo Rivera (caretaker)	1 September 2019
Independiente Medellín	(Colombia) Alexis Mendoza	Resigned	2 September 2019	15th	(Paraguay) Aldo Bobadilla	4 September 2019
Atlético Bucaramanga	(Colombia) Hernán Torres	Resigned	9 September 2019	14th	(Colombia) Sergio Novoa (caretaker)	9 September 2019
Deportivo Pasto	(Colombia) Alexis García	Resigned	15 September 2019	10th	(Colombia) Jairo Enríquez (caretaker)	16 September 2019
Unión Magdalena	(Colombia) Pedro Sarmiento	Sacked	16 September 2019	20th	(Colombia) Carlos Silva	16 September 2019
Envigado	(Colombia) Eduardo Lara	Mutual consent	23 September 2019	16th	(Spain) José Arastey (caretaker)	23 September 2019
Jaguares	(Colombia) John Jairo Bodmer	End of caretaker spell	30 September 2019	20th	(Argentina) Juan Cruz Real	30 September 2019
Deportivo Pasto	(Colombia) Jairo Enríquez	End of caretaker spell	2 October 2019	12th	(Ecuador) Octavio Zambrano	2 October 2019
Patriotas	(Colombia) Diego Corredor	Training trip	3 October 2019	12th	(Colombia) Nelson Gómez	3 October 2019
Atlético Huila	(Colombia) Jorge Luis Bernal	Sacked	26 October 2019	19th	(Colombia) Dayron Pérez (caretaker)	26 October 2019

== Torneo Apertura ==
=== First stage ===
The First stage began on 25 January and consisted of twenty rounds with teams playing each other once plus an extra match against their regional rival. It ended on 5 May with the top eight teams at the end of this stage advancing to the semifinals.

==== Standings ====
Pos	Team	Pld	W	D	L	GF	GA	GD	Pts	Qualification
1	Millonarios	20	11	6	3	30	15	+15	39	Advance to the semifinals
2	Deportivo Cali	20	9	6	5	22	17	+5	33	Advance to the semifinals
3	Deportes Tolima	20	9	5	6	27	16	+11	32	Advance to the semifinals
4	América de Cali	20	9	5	6	26	20	+6	32	Advance to the semifinals
5	Atlético Nacional	20	8	7	5	24	19	+5	31	Advance to the semifinals
6	Deportivo Pasto	20	8	7	5	19	14	+5	31	Advance to the semifinals
7	Junior	20	6	12	2	24	18	+6	30	Advance to the semifinals
8	Unión Magdalena	20	8	6	6	24	24	0	30	Advance to the semifinals
9	Independiente Medellín	20	7	7	6	30	24	+6	28	
10	Once Caldas	20	8	4	8	20	16	+4	28	
11	Cúcuta Deportivo	20	8	3	9	25	27	−2	27	
12	Patriotas	20	7	6	7	20	31	−11	27	
13	Envigado	20	5	9	6	22	20	+2	24	
14	Alianza Petrolera	20	5	8	7	17	19	−2	23	
15	Jaguares	20	5	8	7	20	27	−7	23	
16	La Equidad	20	4	10	6	21	22	−1	22	
17	Atlético Bucaramanga	20	5	6	9	17	26	−9	21	
18	Atlético Huila	20	4	7	9	19	32	−13	19	
19	Rionegro Águilas	20	3	7	10	17	30	−13	16	
20	Santa Fe	20	1	11	8	17	24	−7	14	

Source: Dimayor, Soccerway
Rules for classification: 1) Points, 2) Goal difference, 3) Goals for, 4) Away goals for, 5) Away goals against, 6) Drawing of lots.

==== Results ====
Home \ Away	APE	AME	BUC	HUI	NAC	CUC	TOL	CAL	PAS	ENV	DIM	JAG	JUN	EQU	MIL	ONC	PAT	RIO	SFE	MAG
Alianza Petrolera	—	1–2	—	—	—	0–1	—	1–0	—	—	1–1	1–1	—	2–0	0–2	1–1	3–0	—	0–0	—
América de Cali	—	—	—	—	—	2–0	3–1	0–1	—	—	3–0	1–0	0–1	1–3	1–1	3–1	—	—	0–0	—
Atlético Bucaramanga	3–0	0–0	—	2–4	0–1	1–0	—	—	1–0	—	—	—	—	—	—	1–1	0–1	—	2–1	0–1
Atlético Huila	1–2	2–1	—	—	1–1	—	1–5	—	2–0	—	—	0–2	—	—	—	1–0	1–1	—	0–3	1–1
Atlético Nacional	1–0	2–0	—	—	—	—	—	2–2	0–1	—	1–0	1–0	—	1–1	—	0–0	4–0	—	2–1	—
Cúcuta Deportivo	—	—	3–2	2–0	1–3	—	0–2	—	1–3	1–1	2–2	—	2–1	—	—	—	—	3–0	—	3–1
Deportes Tolima	2–2	—	0–0	0–0	2–1	—	—	—	0–0	2–0	0–1	—	1–2	—	—	—	—	2–0	—	1–0
Deportivo Cali	—	0–1	2–0	1–1	—	2–0	2–1	—	—	1–0	—	—	0–0	—	1–1	—	—	2–1	—	2–1
Deportivo Pasto	1–0	1–1	—	—	—	—	—	1–0	—	1–1	1–0	4–1	—	0–0	1–0	1–2	1–1	—	—	—
Envigado	1–0	4–1	1–2	1–1	4–0	—	—	—	—	—	—	—	—	—	0–1	—	0–0	1–1	0–0	1–1
Independiente Medellín	—	—	4–0	2–1	2–2	—	—	1–1	—	4–1	—	3–0	—	1–1	—	1–1	—	—	1–0	1–1
Jaguares	0–0	—	1–1	—	—	1–1	0–4	1–0	—	2–2	—	—	1–1	1–1	1–2	—	—	2–0	—	—
Junior	1–1	—	0–0	3–0	0–0	—	—	—	0–0	0–0	3–2	—	—	—	—	—	3–1	1–1	—	1–1
La Equidad	—	—	3–1	2–0	—	2–1	0–0	0–0	—	0–1	—	—	2–2	—	0–1	—	2–2	2–2	—	—
Millonarios	—	—	2–0	3–2	1–1	1–0	1–2	—	—	—	3–2	—	2–0	—	—	—	—	1–1	1–1	4–0
Once Caldas	—	—	—	—	—	1–2	2–1	4–0	0–1	1–0	—	0–1	0–1	1–0	1–0	—	—	2–0	—	—
Patriotas	—	1–1	—	—	—	1–0	1–0	0–3	—	—	2–1	2–1	—	3–1	1–3	1–0	—	—	1–1	—
Rionegro Águilas	0–1	1–2	1–1	0–0	2–1	—	—	—	2–1	1–3	0–1	—	—	—	—	—	2–1	—	—	0–1
Santa Fe	—	—	—	—	—	1–2	0–1	1–2	1–1	—	—	0–0	3–3	1–1	0–0	0–2	—	2–2	—	—
Unión Magdalena	1–1	0–3	—	—	1–0	—	—	—	1–0	—	—	3–4	1–1	1–0	—	1–0	4–0	—	3–1	—

Source: Dimayor, Soccerway
Legend: Blue = home team win; Yellow = draw; Red = away team win.

=== Semifinals ===
The eight teams that advanced to the semifinals were drawn into two groups of four teams. The winners of each group advanced to the finals.

==== Group A ====
Pos	Team	Pld	W	D	L	GF	GA	GD	Pts	Qualification	PAS	MIL	AME	MAG
1	Deportivo Pasto	6	4	1	1	11	3	+8	13	Advance to the Finals	—	1–1	1–0	3–0
2	Millonarios	6	3	2	1	7	5	+2	11		1–0	—	1–2	1–0
3	América de Cali	6	3	0	3	9	7	+2	9		0–3	1–2	—	4–0
4	Unión Magdalena	6	0	1	5	2	14	−12	1		1–3	1–1	0–2	—

Source: Dimayor
Legend: Blue = home team win; Yellow = draw; Red = away team win.
Rules for classification: 1) Points, 2) Goal difference, 3) Goals for, 4) Away goals for, 5) Away goals against, 6) Drawing of lots.

==== Group B ====
Pos	Team	Pld	W	D	L	GF	GA	GD	Pts	Qualification	JUN	TOL	CAL	NAC
1	Junior	6	3	3	0	9	5	+4	12	Advance to the Finals	—	1–1	2–0	0–0
2	Deportes Tolima	6	3	3	0	9	6	+3	12		1–1	—	1–1	2–1
3	Deportivo Cali	6	1	1	4	6	9	−3	4		1–2	1–2	—	0–1
4	Atlético Nacional	6	1	1	4	6	10	−4	4		2–3	1–2	1–3	—

Source: Dimayor
Legend: Blue = home team win; Yellow = draw; Red = away team win.
Rules for classification: 1) Points, 2) Goal difference, 3) Goals for, 4) Away goals for, 5) Away goals against, 6) Drawing of lots.

=== Finals ===
8 June 2019
19:30

Junior	1–0	Deportivo Pasto
Sambueza 65'	Report

Estadio Metropolitano Roberto Meléndez, Barranquilla
Attendance: 40,000
Referee: Alexander Ospina

12 June 2019
19:45

Deportivo Pasto	1–0	Junior
Vanegas 81'	Report
Penalties
Cardona (penalty scored); Núñez (penalty scored); Vázquez (penalty scored); Volpi (penalty scored); Vanegas (penalty missed)	4–5	(penalty scored) Narváez; (penalty scored) Rangel; (penalty scored) Pérez; (penalty scored) Sánchez; (penalty scored) Viera

Estadio El Campín, Bogotá
Attendance: 25,722
Referee: Carlos Betancur

Tied 1–1 on aggregate, Junior won on penalties.

=== Top goalscorers ===
Rank	Name	Club	Goals
1	(Argentina) Germán Cano	Independiente Medellín	21
2	(Argentina) Juan Dinenno	Deportivo Cali	15
3	(Venezuela) Fernando Aristeguieta	América de Cali	14
4	(Colombia) Carlos Peralta	La Equidad	10
4	(Colombia) Marco Pérez	Deportes Tolima	10
6	(Colombia) Jonathan Agudelo	Cúcuta Deportivo	9
6	(Colombia) Ricardo Márquez	Unión Magdalena	9
8	(Argentina) Hernán Barcos	Atlético Nacional	7
9	(Colombia) Fabián González	Millonarios	6
9	(Venezuela) Luis González	Deportes Tolima	6
9	(Colombia) Jáder Obrian	Rionegro Águilas	6
9	(Colombia) Alexis Zapata	Envigado	6

Source: Soccerway

== Torneo Finalización ==
=== First stage ===
The First stage began on 13 July and will feature the same format used in the Torneo Apertura, with reversed fixtures. It ended on 29 October with the top eight teams at the end of this stage advancing to the semifinals.

==== Standings ====
Pos	Team	Pld	W	D	L	GF	GA	GD	Pts	Qualification
1	Atlético Nacional	20	9	8	3	30	17	+13	35	Advance to the semifinals
2	América de Cali	20	10	5	5	29	26	+3	35	Advance to the semifinals
3	Deportivo Cali	20	10	4	6	34	25	+9	34	Advance to the semifinals
4	Junior	20	9	6	5	16	9	+7	33	Advance to the semifinals
5	Santa Fe	20	9	5	6	22	12	+10	32	Advance to the semifinals
6	Deportes Tolima	20	9	5	6	24	16	+8	32	Advance to the semifinals
7	Alianza Petrolera	20	8	8	4	17	14	+3	32	Advance to the semifinals
8	Cúcuta Deportivo	20	9	5	6	28	28	0	32	Advance to the semifinals
9	Independiente Medellín	20	9	4	7	32	26	+6	31	
10	Once Caldas	20	7	7	6	26	20	+6	28	
11	Millonarios	20	8	4	8	24	27	−3	28	
12	Atlético Bucaramanga	20	6	7	7	23	23	0	25	
13	Rionegro Águilas	20	5	9	6	25	27	−2	24	
14	Deportivo Pasto	20	5	8	7	24	25	−1	23	
15	Patriotas	20	5	8	7	19	20	−1	23	
16	Envigado	20	5	8	7	23	28	−5	23	
17	La Equidad	20	4	8	8	19	24	−5	20	
18	Atlético Huila	20	2	10	8	13	24	−11	16	
19	Jaguares	20	3	6	11	11	34	−23	15	
20	Unión Magdalena	20	3	5	12	14	28	−14	14	

Source: Dimayor, Soccerway
Rules for classification: 1) Points, 2) Goal difference, 3) Goals for, 4) Away goals for, 5) Away goals against, 6) Drawing of lots.

==== Results ====
Home \ Away	APE	AME	BUC	HUI	NAC	CUC	TOL	CAL	PAS	ENV	DIM	JAG	JUN	EQU	MIL	ONC	PAT	RIO	SFE	MAG
Alianza Petrolera	—	—	1–0	1–0	0–0	—	0–1	—	2–2	1–0	—	1–0	0–0	—	—	—	—	2–2	—	1–0
América de Cali	2–1	—	1–1	0–1	2–1	—	—	2–1	1–0	1–0	—	—	—	—	—	—	1–1	1–1	—	2–0
Atlético Bucaramanga	—	—	—	—	—	2–0	1–1	0–1	—	2–3	2–2	4–0	0–0	2–2	1–2	—	—	2–0	—	—
Atlético Huila	—	—	1–2	—	—	1–1	0–1	2–2	—	0–0	0–1	—	1–1	3–2	1–1	—	—	1–1	—	—
Atlético Nacional	—	—	0–0	4–1	—	2–3	1–0	—	—	1–1	5–2	—	0–1	—	1–1	—	—	1–0	—	3–1
Cúcuta Deportivo	1–1	3–1	2–0	—	—	—	—	1–4	—	—	—	1–1	—	2–1	3–1	1–1	1–0	—	1–0	—
Deportes Tolima	—	0–1	—	0–0	—	2–1	—	5–2	—	—	—	2–0	—	0–1	2–0	0–0	2–1	—	4–0	—
Deportivo Cali	0–1	3–2	—	—	0–0	—	—	—	3–1	—	1–0	4–0	—	2–0	—	2–1	3–1	—	0–0	—
Deportivo Pasto	—	—	1–1	4–0	1–2	2–1	0–0	—	—	—	—	—	2–1	—	—	1–0	—	3–3	0–0	2–0
Envigado	—	—	—	—	—	4–1	2–1	1–1	1–1	—	2–4	2–0	0–0	0–0	—	1–3	—	3–3	—	—
Independiente Medellín	2–0	4–1	—	—	1–4	3–0	1–1	—	3–1	—	—	—	0–1	—	1–2	—	3–0	1–2	—	—
Jaguares	0–0	2–2	—	1–0	1–1	—	—	—	1–1	—	0–1	—	—	—	—	2–1	1–1	—	0–3	1–0
Junior	—	0–1	—	—	—	0–0	1–0	3–0	—	—	—	3–0	—	1–0	1–0	0–1	—	—	1–0	1–0
La Equidad	1–2	3–3	—	—	0–0	—	—	—	0–0	—	0–1	2–0	—	—	—	1–1	1–0	—	0–3	2–0
Millonarios	2–1	1–2	—	—	—	—	—	2–1	2–1	1–2	—	2–1	—	3–2	—	1–0	0–0	—	2–4	—
Once Caldas	0–0	2–1	3–0	1–1	1–2	—	—	—	3–1	—	1–1	—	—	—	—	—	2–2	—	0–1	3–1
Patriotas	1–1	—	0–1	1–0	1–2	—	—	—	1–0	3–0	—	—	2–0	1–1	—	—	—	2–0	—	1–1
Rionegro Águilas	—	—	—	—	—	1–3	3–0 (Note: The match, which originally ended 0–2, was awarded 3–0 to Rionegro Águilas due to Deportes Tolima presenting Rafael Carrascal as one of their bench players despite playing for América de Cali.)	1–4	—	1–1	—	3–0	1–0	0–0	0–0	1–2	—	—	1–0	—
Santa Fe	0–1	1–2	2–0	0–0	0–0	—	—	—	—	3–0	2–0	—	—	—	1–0	—	0–0	—	—	2–0
Unión Magdalena	—	—	1–2	0–0	—	1–2	1–2	2–0	—	1–0	1–1	—	1–1	—	2–1	—	—	1–1	—	—

Source: Dimayor, Soccerway
Legend: Blue = home team win; Yellow = draw; Red = away team win.

=== Semifinals ===
The eight teams that advanced to the semifinals were drawn into two groups of four teams. The winners of each group advanced to the finals.

==== Group A ====
Pos	Team	Pld	W	D	L	GF	GA	GD	Pts	Qualification	JUN	TOL	NAC	CUC
1	Junior	6	3	2	1	11	8	+3	11	Advance to the Finals	—	1–3	2–0	1–0
2	Deportes Tolima	6	2	3	1	7	5	+2	9		2–2	—	1–0	0–1
3	Atlético Nacional	6	2	2	2	7	7	0	8		2–2	1–1	—	3–1
4	Cúcuta Deportivo	6	1	1	4	3	8	−5	4		1–3	0–0	0–1	—

Source: Dimayor, Soccerway
Legend: Blue = home team win; Yellow = draw; Red = away team win.
Rules for classification: 1) Points, 2) Goal difference, 3) Goals for, 4) Away goals for, 5) Goals against, 6) Drawing of lots.

==== Group B ====
Pos	Team	Pld	W	D	L	GF	GA	GD	Pts	Qualification	AME	CAL	SFE	APE
1	América de Cali	6	4	0	2	9	5	+4	12	Advance to the Finals	—	1–0	2–0	3–1
2	Deportivo Cali	6	2	2	2	6	6	0	8		2–1	—	1–0	0–0
3	Santa Fe	6	2	2	2	5	6	−1	8		2–1	1–1	—	1–0
4	Alianza Petrolera	6	1	2	3	5	8	−3	5		0–1	3–2	1–1	—

Source: Dimayor, Soccerway
Legend: Blue = home team win; Yellow = draw; Red = away team win.
Rules for classification: 1) Points, 2) Goal difference, 3) Goals for, 4) Away goals for, 5) Goals against, 6) Drawing of lots.

=== Finals ===
This final series featured the use of VAR for the first time in Colombian domestic football.

1 December 2019
19:00

Junior	0–0	América de Cali
	Report

Estadio Metropolitano Roberto Meléndez, Barranquilla
Referee: Mario Herrera

7 December 2019
16:00

América de Cali	2–0	Junior
Viera 19' (o.g.); Sierra 34'	Report

Estadio Pascual Guerrero, Cali
Referee: Wilmar Roldán

América de Cali won 2–0 on aggregate.

=== Top goalscorers ===
Rank	Name	Club	Goals
1	(Argentina) Germán Cano	Independiente Medellín	13
1	(Colombia) Michael Rangel	América de Cali	13
3	(Argentina) Juan Dinenno	Deportivo Cali	11
4	(Colombia) Carmelo Valencia	Cúcuta Deportivo	10
5	(Colombia) Jhon Vásquez	Alianza Petrolera	9
6	(Colombia) Maicol Balanta	Santa Fe	7
6	(Colombia) Daniel Muñoz	Atlético Nacional	7
6	(Costa Rica) José Guillermo Ortiz	Millonarios	7
9	(Colombia) Jefferson Duque	Santa Fe	6
9	(Colombia) Feiver Mercado	Deportivo Cali	6
9	(Colombia) John Freddy Pérez	Atlético Bucaramanga	6

Source: Soccerway

== Aggregate table ==
Pos	Team	Pld	W	D	L	GF	GA	GD	Pts	Qualification
1	América de Cali (C)	54	27	11	16	75	58	+17	92	Qualification for Copa Libertadores group stage
2	Junior (C)	56	22	24	10	61	43	+18	90	Qualification for Copa Libertadores group stage
3	Deportes Tolima	52	23	16	13	67	43	+24	85	Qualification for Copa Libertadores second stage
4	Deportivo Cali	52	22	13	17	68	57	+11	79	Qualification for Copa Sudamericana first stage
5	Atlético Nacional	52	20	18	14	67	53	+14	78	Qualification for Copa Sudamericana first stage
6	Millonarios	46	22	12	12	61	47	+14	78	Qualification for Copa Sudamericana first stage
7	Deportivo Pasto	48	18	16	14	55	43	+12	70	Qualification for Copa Sudamericana first stage
8	Cúcuta Deportivo	46	18	9	19	56	63	−7	63	
9	Alianza Petrolera	46	14	18	14	39	41	−2	60	
10	Independiente Medellín	40	16	11	13	62	50	+12	59	Qualification for Copa Libertadores second stage (Note: Independiente Medellín qualified for the Copa Libertadores second stage by winning the 2019 Copa Colombia.)
11	Once Caldas	40	15	11	14	46	36	+10	56	
12	Santa Fe	46	12	18	16	44	42	+2	54	
13	Patriotas	40	12	14	14	39	51	−12	50	
14	Envigado	40	10	17	13	45	48	−3	47	
15	Atlético Bucaramanga	40	11	13	16	40	49	−9	46	
16	Unión Magdalena	46	11	12	23	40	66	−26	45	
17	La Equidad	40	8	18	14	40	46	−6	42	
18	Rionegro Águilas	40	8	16	16	42	57	−15	40	
19	Jaguares	40	8	14	18	31	61	−30	38	
20	Atlético Huila	40	6	17	17	32	56	−24	35	

Source: Dimayor
Rules for classification: 1) Points, 2) Goal difference, 3) Goals for, 4) Away goals for, 5) Away goals against, 6) Drawing of lots.
(C) Champions

== Relegation ==
A separate table is kept to determine the teams that get relegated to the Categoría Primera B for the next season. This table is elaborated from a sum of all first stage games played for the current season and the previous two seasons. For purposes of elaborating the table, promoted teams are given the same point and goal tallies as the team in the 18th position at the start of the season.

Pos	Team	2017 Pts	2018 Pts	2019 Pts	Total Pld	Total GF	Total GA	Total GD	Total Pts	Relegation
1	Atlético Nacional	87	71	66	118	162	87	75	224	
2	Independiente Medellín	69	69	59	118	181	135	46	197	
3	Deportes Tolima	53	72	64	118	156	116	40	189	
4	Junior	62	62	63	118	148	101	47	187	
5	Millonarios	69	51	67	118	151	114	37	187	
6	Deportivo Cali	53	58	67	118	153	126	27	178	
7	América de Cali	60	47	67	118	141	132	9	174	
8	Santa Fe	67	56	46	118	123	98	25	169	
9	Once Caldas	42	63	56	118	131	131	0	161	
10	La Equidad	53	61	42	118	120	111	9	156	
11	Atlético Bucaramanga	47	58	46	118	120	135	−15	151	
12	Cúcuta Deportivo	46	42	59	118	139	166	−27	147	
13	Deportivo Pasto	56	35	54	118	125	128	–3	145	
14	Patriotas	45	49	50	118	108	137	−29	144	
15	Alianza Petrolera	46	42	55	118	120	144	−24	143	
16	Envigado	44	46	47	118	121	144	−23	137	
17	Rionegro Águilas	39	57	40	118	111	145	−34	136	
18	Jaguares	59	39	38	118	103	150	−47	136	
19	Unión Magdalena (R)	46	42	44	118	124	163	−39	132	Relegation to Categoría Primera B
20	Atlético Huila (R)	48	48	35	118	102	138	−36	131	Relegation to Categoría Primera B

Source: Dimayor
Rules for classification: 1st points; 2nd goal difference; 3rd goals scored; 4th away goals scored.

== See also ==
- 2019 Categoría Primera B season
- 2019 Copa Colombia
