= Carlos Silva (Colombian footballer) =

Colombian footballer and manager (born 1973)

Personal information
- Full name: Carlos Alberto Silva Socarrás
- Date of birth: 29 April 1973 (age 53)
- Place of birth: Santa Marta, Colombia

Team information
- Current team: Unión Magdalena (manager)

Senior career*
Years	Team	Apps	(Gls)
- Unión Magdalena

Managerial career
- 1996–2007: Unión Magdalena (youth)
- 2008–2010: Unión Magdalena
- 2011–2012: Unión Magdalena
- 2015–2016: Unión Magdalena
- 2017: Unión Comercio
- 2019–2022: Unión Magdalena
- 2022–2025: Unión Magdalena (youth)
- 2025: Unión Magdalena (interim)
- 2025–: Unión Magdalena
- * Club domestic league appearances and goals

Carlos Alberto Silva Socarrás (born 29 April 1973) is a Colombian football manager and former player. He is the current manager of Unión Magdalena.

== Career ==
Silva was born in Santa Marta, and played for hometown side Unión Magdalena as a senior. After retiring, he returned to the club in 1996 as a manager of the youth categories.

Ahead of the 2008 season, Silva was named manager of Magdalena's first team in the Categoría Primera B. He left in August 2010, being subsequently replaced by Arturo Boyacá.

On 23 April 2011, Silva was again named at Unión Magdalena, in the place of Eduardo Retat. He remained in charge until the end of the 2012 season, as the club missed out promotion in the Finals.

Silva returned to Magdalena in 2014, but as a coordinator of the youth categories. On 21 August of the following year, he again replaced Retat at the helm of the first team.

Silva left Unión Magdalena again in September 2016, and moved abroad the following May after being presented as manager of Peruvian side Unión Comercio. In September, however, he was sacked.

On 17 September 2019, Silva returned to Unión Magdalena, with the club seriously threatened with relegation in the Categoría Primera A. Despite failing to avoid relegation, he remained in charge, and led the club back to the top tier in 2021.

On 12 April 2022, after the appointment of Claudio Rodríguez as manager of Magdalena, Silva was demoted to the role of youth manager. In 2025, Unión Magdalena appointed Silva as an interim manager twice, first in March following the departure of Jorge Luis Pinto and later on 3 August to replace Alexis García and Gerardo Bedoya. Twenty-three days later, Silva was confirmed as Unión Magdalena's incumbent manager for the remainder of the season.
