= Jhon Jairo Bodmer =

Colombian footballer and manager (born 1981)

Personal information
- Full name: Jhon Jairo Bodmer Restrepo
- Date of birth: 27 November 1981 (age 44)
- Place of birth: Bogotá, Colombia

Team information
- Current team: ADA (manager)

Managerial career
- Years: Team
- 2009–2010: Expreso Rojo (assistant)
- 2010–2018: Tigres
- 2019: Jaguares de Córdoba
- 2019: Jaguares de Córdoba (interim)
- 2020–2021: Valledupar
- 2021–2023: Costa Rica (assistant)
- 2023: Atlético Nacional (youth)
- 2023–2024: Atlético Nacional
- 2024–2025: Deportivo Pereira (assistant)
- 2025: La Equidad
- 2026–: ADA

Jhon Jairo Bodmer Restrepo (born 27 November 1981) is a Colombian football manager, currently in charge of Peruvian club ADA.

== Career ==
Born in Bogotá, Bodmer began his career as an assistant of Expreso Rojo. He became manager of the club in July 2010, replacing Luis Herney Melo, and achieved promotion to the Categoría Primera A with the side in the 2016 season, with the club now being named Tigres FC.

On 19 October 2018, Bodmer was sacked from Tigres after more than eight years in charge. He took over Jaguares de Córdoba late in the month for the subsequent campaign, but resigned on 13 March 2019.

On 27 August 2019, however, Bodmer returned to Jaguares as an interim manager, replacing Óscar Upegui. He left the post on 30 September after the appointment of Juan Cruz Real, and started the 2020 season in charge of Valledupar.

On 23 June 2021, Bodmer resigned from Valledupar to become an assistant of Luis Fernando Suárez at the Costa Rica national team. On 11 September, he was announced as manager of Atlético Nacional's under-20 team.

On 9 October 2023, Bodmer replaced William Amaral at the helm of the main squad of the Verdolagas. On 23 February 2024, two days after a defeat for Atlético Nacional in their first 2024 Copa Libertadores match against Nacional Asunción and coupled with a poor start to the league campaign, Bodmer resigned from the club for safety reasons after members of his family group reported threats and intimidations.

On 24 June 2024, Bodmer was presented by Deportivo Pereira as assistant manager, rejoining Luis Fernando Suárez's coaching staff. He resigned from Pereira on 3 March 2025, and was announced by fellow Categoría Primera A club La Equidad as its new manager two days later. On 12 May, Bodmer was sacked from La Equidad, after the team lost seven out of 11 matches.

== Honours ==
Atlético Nacional

- Copa Colombia: 2023
