= Juan Camilo Salazar (footballer, born 1997) =

Colombian footballer

Personal information
- Full name: Juan Camilo Salazar Hinestrosa
- Date of birth: 29 June 1997 (age 29)
- Place of birth: Zarzal, Colombia
- Height: 1.70 m (5 ft 7 in)
- Position: Winger

Team information
- Current team: Changchun Yatai
- Number: 7

Senior career*
Years	Team	Apps	(Gls)
2018–2022	Millonarios	60	(4)
2019	→ San Lorenzo (loan)	2	(0)
2021–2022	→ Águilas Doradas (loan)	28	(3)
2022–2023	FAS	29	(7)
2023–2024	Ionikos	17	(7)
2024–2025	Panserraikos	32	(8)
2025–	Changchun Yatai	33	(14)
- * Club domestic league appearances and goals as of 7 November 2026

Juan Camilo Salazar Hinestrosa (born 29 June 1997) is a Colombian professional footballer who plays as a winger for China League One club Changchun Yatai.

== Career ==
Salazar began his career with Millonarios. His professional bow came in a fixture with Deportivo Cali in Categoría Primera A on 24 February 2018, with the defender being substituted on in place of Christian Huérfano on seventy-two minutes in a 2–0 loss. Salazar scored his opening senior goal against Deportivo Pasto in April, which was the first of three overall goals across thirty-nine fixtures in all competitions across the 2018 campaign.

On 31 January 2019, three days after featuring in the club's 2019 opener versus Envigado, Salazar departed to Argentina to join San Lorenzo.

On 16 July 2025, Salazar joined Chinese Super League club Changchun Yatai.

== Career statistics ==
As of match played 7 November 2026

Appearances and goals by club, season and competition
Club	Season	League			Cup		Continental		Other		Total	
Club	Season	Division	Apps	Goals	Apps	Goals	Apps	Goals	Apps	Goals	Apps	Goals
Millonarios	2018	Categoría Primera A	26	1	5	2	8 (Note: Appearance(s) in the Copa Libertadores and Copa Sudamericana)	0	—		39	3
Millonarios	2019	Categoría Primera A	10	0	1	0	—		—		11	0
Millonarios	2020	Categoría Primera A	16	3	1	0	2 (Note: Appearance(s) in the Copa Sudamericana)	0	—		19	3
Millonarios	2021	Categoría Primera A	8	0	—		—		—		8	0
Millonarios	Total		60	4	6	2	8	0	—		74	6
San Lorenzo (loan)	2018–19	Argentine Primera División	2	0	0	0	4 (Note: Appearance(s) in the Copa Libertadores)	0	2 (Note: Appearance(s) in the Copa de la Superliga)	0	8	0
Águilas Doradas (loan)	2021	Categoría Primera A	17	3	2	0	—		—		19	3
Águilas Doradas (loan)	2022	Categoría Primera A	11	0	2	0	—		—		13	0
Águilas Doradas (loan)	Total		28	3	4	0	—		—		32	3
FAS	2022–23	La Liga Mayor	29	7	—		—		—		29	7
Ionikos	2023–24	Super League Greece 2	17	7	0	0	—		—		17	7
Panserraikos	2024–25	Super League Greece	32	8	3	0	—		—		35	8
Changchun Yatai	2025	Chinese Super League	11	2	—		—		—		11	2
Changchun Yatai	2026	China League One	22	12	0	0	—		—		22	12
Changchun Yatai	Total		33	14	0	0	—		—		33	14
Career total			112	19	11	2	14	0	2	0	139	21
