= Duván Vergara =

Colombian footballer (born 1996)

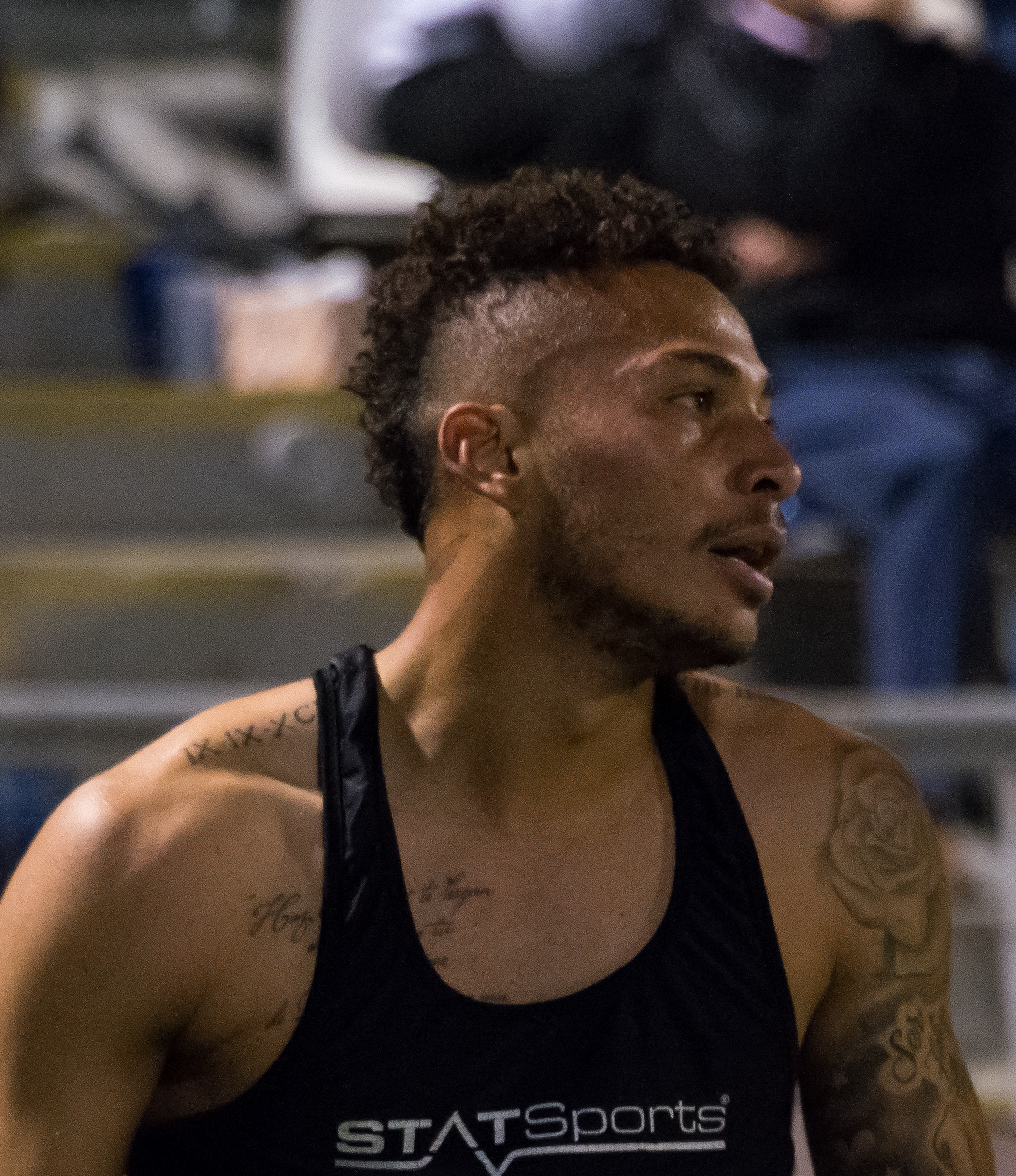
- Vergara in 2019

Personal information
- Full name: Duván Andrés Vergara Hernández
- Date of birth: 9 September 1996 (age 30)
- Place of birth: Montería, Colombia
- Height: 1.73 m (5 ft 8 in)
- Position: Winger

Team information
- Current team: Racing Club
- Number: 7

Youth career
- Envigado

Senior career*
Years	Team	Apps	(Gls)
2015–2019	Envigado	100	(13)
2019	Rosario Central	5	(0)
2019–2021	América de Cali	55	(14)
2021–2024	Monterrey	35	(6)
2023–2024	→ Santos Laguna (loan)	19	(1)
2024–2025	América de Cali	44	(15)
2025–	Racing Club	42	(6)
- * Club domestic league appearances and goals as of 18:03, 8 November 2026 (UTC)

Duván Andrés Vergara Hernández (9 September 1996) is a Colombian professional footballer who plays as a winger for Argentine Primera División club Racing Club.

== Career ==
=== América de Cali ===
On 16 July 2019, it was confirmed that Vergara had joined América de Cali on a one-year loan from Argentine club Rosario Central with an option to buy. In December 2019, América triggered the option and bought him free from Rosario for the 2020 season.

On 21 January 2021, Vergara, along with teammates Yesus Cabrera and Marlon Torres, was fined COP 600,000 for using offensive language toward Teófilo Gutiérrez during an Instagram Live shortly after América de Cali won the 2020 league title. Vergara said, “Teo, la más perra,” which roughly translates to “Teo, the biggest bitch.” The comments appeared to be a response to remarks Teo had made after Junior defeated América in the 2020 Superliga Colombiana, when he said, “¿Dónde están las loquitas de la B?, which transaltes to “Where are the little queens from the B?” This was a taunt referencing América's relegation in 2011.

=== Monterrey ===
On 8 July 2021, Vergara transferred from América de Cali to Monterrey on a permanent deal.

== Career statistics ==
=== Club ===
As of match played 23 January 2022

Appearances and goals by club, season and competition
Club	Season	League			National cup		League cup		Continental		Other		Total	
Club	Season	Division	Apps	Goals	Apps	Goals	Apps	Goals	Apps	Goals	Apps	Goals	Apps	Goals
Envigado	2015	Categoría Primera A	12	0	2	0	—		—		—		14	0
Envigado	2016	Categoría Primera A	30	6	2	0	—		—		—		32	6
Envigado	2017	Categoría Primera A	25	1	2	0	—		—		—		27	1
Envigado	2018	Categoría Primera A	33	6	3	1	—		—		—		36	7
Envigado	Total		100	13	9	1	0	0	0	0	0	0	109	14
Rosario Central	2018–19	Primera División	5	0	0	0	1	0	2 (Note: Appearances in Copa Libertadores)	1	0	0	8	1
América de Cali	2019	Categoría Primera A	22	5	2	1	—		—		—		24	6
América de Cali	2020	Categoría Primera A	21	6	1	0	—		5	3	2 (Note: Appearances in Superliga Colombiana)	1	29	10
América de Cali	2021	Categoría Primera A	12	3	—		—		5	0	—		17	3
América de Cali	Total		55	14	3	1	0	0	10	3	2	1	70	19
Monterrey	2021–22	Liga MX	22	5					2	1			24	6
Career total			182	32	12	2	1	0	14	5	2	1	211	40

== Honours ==
América de Cali

- Categoría Primera A: 2019-I, 2020

Monterrey

- CONCACAF Champions League: 2021
