= Francisco Córdoba (footballer) =

Colombian footballer (born 1988)

Personal information
- Full name: Francisco Antonio Córdoba Escarpeta
- Date of birth: September 8, 1988 (age 38)
- Place of birth: Pueblo Rico, Risaralda, Colombia
- Height: 5 ft 8 in (1.73 m)
- Position: Defender

Team information
- Current team: Deportivo Pereira

Senior career*
Years	Team	Apps	(Gls)
2008–2013	Deportivo Pereira	121	(8)
2011	→ Independiente Medellín (loan)	13	(0)
2012	→ Cúcuta Deportivo (loan)	14	(0)
2013–2014	Atlético Huila	18	(3)
2014	La Equidad	4	(0)
2015	Charlotte Independence	1	(0)
2015–2017	Deportivo Pasto	66	(3)
2018–	Deportivo Pereira	56	(2)
- * Club domestic league appearances and goals as of April 20, 2015

Francisco Antonio Córdoba Escarpeta (born September 8, 1988) is a Colombian footballer who currently plays for Deportivo Pereira.

== Career ==
Cordoba began playing in his native Colombia from 2008 with Deportivo Pereira, also having spells with Independiente Medellín, Cúcuta Deportivo, Atlético Huila and La Equidad, before moving to the United States in 2015 with United Soccer League club Charlotte Independence.
