= Atlético Nacional–Millonarios F.C. rivalry =

Colombian football rivalry

Atlético Nacional–Millonarios rivalry
- Other names: Superclásico del fútbol colombiano El clásico con más estrellas
- Location: Bogotá, Colombia; Medellín, Colombia
- Teams: Millonarios; Atlético Nacional
- First meeting: Millonarios 3–4 Atlético Municipal; 1948 Campeonato Profesional (3 October 1948)
- Latest meeting: Atlético Nacional 1–1 Millonarios; 2026 Finalización (24 September 2026)
- Next meeting: TBD
- Stadiums: Estadio El Campín (Millonarios); Estadio Atanasio Girardot (Atlético Nacional)

Statistics
- Total meetings: 303
- Most wins: Millonarios (115)
- Most player appearances: Alexis García (50 matches)
- All-time series: Millonarios: 115; Draw: 102; Atlético Nacional: 86
- Largest victory: Atlético Nacional 0–7 Millonarios (29 April 1951); Atlético Nacional 5–0 Millonarios (10 August 2014)

The Atlético Nacional–Millonarios rivalry is a major rivalry involving Millonarios from Bogotá and Atlético Nacional from Medellín, the two most successful and two of the most popular clubs in Colombian football. Dubbed by Colombian media as well as CONMEBOL as one of the most important clásicos or a "superclásico" of Colombian football, this rivalry is also considered one of the greatest classic matches in South America by the international press. The rivalry is fueled by a social, cultural and regional character, since it evokes the historical rivalry between two of the most developed regions of Colombia: the Antioquia Department (specifically its capital city Medellín) and the nation's capital Bogotá.

This match gained importance starting from the decade of the 80s, at a moment when Millonarios had consolidated themselves as the dominating team in Colombian football and Atlético Nacional began to stand out both in local competition and continental tournaments. Since then, the rivalry between Verdolagas and Embajadores has grown stronger, especially from heated altercations between fans.

The scope of this rivalry is endorsed by the numerous confrontations with each other, to the point of being one of the games most played in the history of Colombian football, in addition to having faced each other in almost all the competitions they have played, including international tournaments such as the Copa Libertadores de América, Copa Sudamericana and Copa Merconorte. However, the turning point in this rivalry was the 1989 Copa Libertadores quarter-final series between both teams, in which Atlético Nacional eliminated Millonarios on the way to winning their first Copa Libertadores after winning 1–0 in Medellín and drawing 1–1 at Estadio El Campín, with controversial refereeing by Chilean referee Hernán Silva in the second leg, and after accusations that the international referees who had to handle Atlético Nacional games received threats to favor this team. As of 2025, both sides, as well as Santa Fe from Bogotá have been the only teams to have competed in every Categoría Primera A tournament.

== History ==
=== Early years ===
These two clubs met for the first time in the 1948 Campeonato Profesional on Sunday 3 October 1948 in Bogotá, where the Antioquia team (which at that time was called Atlético Municipal) won by a 4–3 score.

During the first 25 years of the Colombian professional football tournament, the difference between the two clubs was notably wide, since Millonarios had already harvested nine league titles and two Copa Colombia titles, while Atlético Nacional had only been league champions in 1954 and spent 19 years without a title until 1973. On 29 April 1951, Millonarios achieved a historic victory in Medellín by a 7–0 score, with five goals by "Maestrico" Antonio Báez and a brace by Alfredo Di Stefano, in the biggest margin of victory between the two clubs in history.

Until the beginning of the decade of the 70s, the only relevant confrontation between both clubs had been in the first Copa Colombia edition (1950–51), in which they met in the third stage of the losers' round and Millonarios knocked Atlético Nacional out after thrashing them 4–0 in the first leg in Bogotá on 5 November 1950 with goals by Adolfo Pedernera, Victor Latuada and two goals by Alfredo Di Stefano. In the second leg played at the San Fernando stadium in Itagüí one week later on 12 November 1950, they drew 1–1 with goals from Robert Flawell for Millonarios and Apolinar Pérez for Atlético Nacional.

In 1971, Atlético Nacional and Millonarios qualified for the final round of the Campeonato Profesional along with Santa Fe and Deportivo Cali, facing each other on the final matchday on 29 December. Millonarios, being one point clear of both Nacional and Santa Fe, only needed to beat the Verdolagas at home in order to claim the title, however Nacional won the match 1–0 and were able to force a tiebreaker final series against Santa Fe, which was eventually won by the latter side. Both teams also fought each other for the league championship in 1972, 1973, 1976 and 1978, with Millonarios winning the league in 1972 and 1978, and Nacional winning it in 1973 and 1976. In 1974 they faced each other in the group stage of the Copa Libertadores, with Millonarios winning both matches against the Verdolagas and advancing to the semi-finals of the competition.

=== The 1980s ===
Whilst the start of this decade saw both Millonarios and Atlético Nacional being overshadowed by the rise of América de Cali who won five league titles in a row between 1982 and 1986, the two sides tried to remain close to the title race, especially in the latter half of the decade. Although both teams decided to rely on homegrown managers, with Luis Augusto García for Millonarios and Francisco Maturana in Nacional's case, their approach on players differed since Millonarios chose to lure top foreign players while Nacional bet on a project that only involved Colombian players (puros criollos). The two teams were the main contenders for the 1988 championship, reaching the last matchday of the final octagonal tied in points, with Millonarios edging Nacional on goal difference. In that last day of the season, Millonarios faced Junior in Barranquilla, whilst Nacional travelled to Bogotá to take on Santa Fe. By halftime, Atlético Nacional were leading against Santa Fe and claiming the title since Millonarios were losing their match, however, a goal by Mario Vanemerak coupled with an equalizer for Santa Fe against Nacional allowed Millonarios to clinch their thirteenth title.

==== 1989 Copa Libertadores ====
As Colombian champion and runner-up, Millonarios and Atlético Nacional qualified for the 1989 Copa Libertadores, in which they played each other twice during the group stage, with a 1–1 draw in Bogotá and a 2–0 victory for Millonarios in Medellín. Eventually both sides advanced to the knockout stages, with Millonarios winning the group and Nacional placing as runners-up, ahead of Ecuadorian sides Deportivo Quito and Emelec, and crossed their paths again in the quarter-finals. In the first leg, Nacional defeated Millonarios 1–0 in Medellín with a goal by Albeiro Usuriaga, meaning that a draw in the second leg in Bogotá would send Nacional through to the semi-finals, whilst Millonarios required to win. The match played at Estadio El Campín became the pivotal point that intensified this rivalry, as it was marked by a controversial refereeing by Chilean Hernán Silva who ignored a penalty for Millonarios after striker Arnoldo Iguarán was fouled by Atlético Nacional keeper René Higuita within the Verdolaga box. With goals by Carlos Estrada for Millonarios and John Jairo Tréllez for Atlético Nacional, the match ended in a 1–1 draw that qualified Nacional for the semi-finals of the competition, which they ultimately won by beating Paraguayan side Olimpia on penalties, with the second leg of the final being played in Bogotá.

=== The 1990s ===
In this decade, Atlético Nacional went on to win three domestic and three international titles, while at the same time Millonarios did not win any title within Colombia or abroad, only finishing as league runners-up twice. One of those times was the 1994 tournament, in which Nacional won both the Apertura and Finalización tournaments, with Millonarios placing second in the latter one. The two sides eventually made it to the final round of the competition and reached the final day of the season tied in points, with Nacional leading Millonarios by 0.5 bonus points. On the last matchday, Millonarios beat América de Cali but it was not enough for them since Atlético Nacional defeated Independiente Medellín in the derby with a goal by Juan Pablo Ángel, clinching the title on bonus points and leaving Millonarios as runners-up.

In 1995 they met again at the quarter-finals of the Copa Libertadores. Atlético Nacional beat Millonarios 2–1 in Medellín and drew 1–1 in Bogotá to advance to the semi-finals. Eventually they made it to the finals, losing to Brazilian club Grêmio. The next time the two sides faced each other in an international tournament was in the semi-finals of the 1998 Copa Merconorte, with Nacional winning the double-legged series by a 3–2 aggregate score. They went on to win the title of that competition, defeating Deportivo Cali in the final.

=== The 21st century ===
The 2000 Copa Merconorte final was the first time both Atlético Nacional and Millonarios faced each other in a title-deciding series. The first leg, played in Bogotá, ended in a scoreless draw, whilst the second leg played in Medellín ended with a 2–1 win for Atlético Nacional with which the latter clinched their second title in the competition. Seven years later, they played each other in the second round of the Copa Sudamericana, in which Millonarios knocked Atlético Nacional out of the tournament after winning the first leg in Medellín by a 3–2 score and drawing the return leg at El Campín 0–0.

In 2013, Millonarios and Atlético Nacional played the final of that year's Copa Colombia. The first leg, played in Bogotá ended in a 2–2 draw. Atlético Nacional had taken a 2–0 lead at halftime with goals by Sherman Cárdenas and Fernando Uribe, but Millonarios were able to come back in the second half and eventually equalized the match with goals by Román Torres and Yuber Asprilla. The second leg, played at Estadio Atanasio Girardot, was won by Nacional 1–0 with a goal scored in a setpiece by Juan David Valencia, winning the series 3–2 on aggregate and successfully defending the Copa Colombia title.

On 10 August 2014 Atlético Nacional achieved their biggest victory over Millonarios, thrashing the Embajador side 5–0 in a match valid for the 2014 Finalización tournament.

The next time Atlético Nacional and Millonarios played each other in a final series was at the 2018 Superliga Colombiana, which they played as the champions of the Categoría Primera A tournaments played during the 2017 season. The first leg, played in Bogotá, ended in a scoreless stalemate, whilst the second leg was won by Millonarios by a 2–1 score with a brace by Roberto Ovelar, claiming their first title in the competition.

The 2023 season featured two final series between both sides, one of which being the first one with a Primera A title at stake, played in the 2023 Apertura tournament, with both sides reaching the decisive stage of the tournament after winning their respective semi-final groups. The first leg was played at Estadio Atanasio Girardot, ending in a scoreless draw, whilst the second leg played in Bogotá ended in another draw with goals by Jefferson Duque for Atlético Nacional and Andrés Llinás for Millonarios, leaving the title to be decided in a penalty shoot-out after the 1–1 draw on aggregate. Eventually Millonarios won the shoot-out by a 3–2 score and claimed their sixteenth league title. Later that year, both teams also faced each other at the final series of the Copa Colombia, which was won by Atlético Nacional on penalty kicks after a 2–2 draw on aggregate.

In 2026, Atlético Nacional and Millonarios faced each other in international competition for the first time in 19 years, with qualification to the group stage of the 2026 Copa Sudamericana at stake. The match, played in Medellín, ended with Millonarios winning 3–1.

== Statistics ==
=== Head-to-head ===
As of 24 September 2026

Competition	Matches	Wins Atlético Nacional	Draws	Wins Millonarios	Goals Atlético Nacional	Goals Millonarios
Categoría Primera A	278	81	91	106	341	406
Copa Colombia	6	1	4	1	6	9
Superliga Colombiana	2	0	1	1	1	2
Copa Libertadores	10	2	4	4	7	13
Copa Sudamericana	3	0	1	2	3	6
Copa Merconorte	4	2	1	1	5	3
Total matches	303	86	102	115	363	439

=== Honours ===
Major honours won
Competition	Atlético Nacional	Millonarios
Categoría Primera A	18	16
Copa Colombia	7	3
Superliga Colombiana	4	2
Copa Libertadores	2	0
Recopa Sudamericana	1	0
Copa Merconorte	2	1
Copa Interamericana	2	0
Copa Simón Bolívar	0	1
Total	36	23

=== Records ===
- Record wins
  - Atlético Nacional:
    - Home: Atlético Nacional 5–0 Millonarios, Estadio Atanasio Girardot, 10 August 2014
    - Away: Millonarios 1–4 Atlético Nacional, Estadio El Campín, 1976
  - Millonarios:
    - Home: Millonarios 6–0 Atlético Nacional, Estadio El Campín, 12 June 1949
    - Away: Atlético Nacional 0–7 Millonarios, Estadio Atanasio Girardot, 29 April 1951
- Most goals scored in a match
  - Atlético Nacional 6–4 Millonarios, Estadio Atanasio Girardot, 1978 Apertura
