= Belmer Aguilar =

Colombian footballer (born 1973)

Bélmer Aguilar
Personal information
- Full name: Jhon Bélmer Aguilar López
- Date of birth: November 30, 1973 (age 52)
- Place of birth: Chigorodó, Colombia
- Height: 1.87 m (6 ft 2 in)
- Position: Defender

Senior career*
Years	Team	Apps	(Gls)
1995–1997	Independiente Medellín	?	(?)
1999	Atlético Bucaramanga	?	(?)
2000–2002	Junior	?	(?)
2002	Atlético Bucaramanga	?	(?)
2003–2004	Millonarios	?	(?)
2004	Envigado	?	(?)
2005	Deportivo Pereira	?	(?)
2005	Envigado	?	(?)
2006	Junior	?	(?)
2006–2007	Atlético Huila	?	(?)
2007–2008	Independiente Medellín	?	(?)
2009	Deportes Quindío	21	(2)
2010	América de Cali	23	(1)
2011–2012	Cortuluá	59	(2)

Managerial career
- 2020–2021: Boyacá Chicó
- 2023: Boyacá Chicó
- * Club domestic league appearances and goals as of November 5, 2012 ‡ National team caps and goals as of July 16, 2012

Jhon Bélmer Aguilar López (born 30 November 1973) is a Colombian football manager and former defender.
