= Sergio Novoa =

Colombian footballer and manager (born 1981)

Personal information
- Full name: Sergio Iván Novoa Villamizar
- Date of birth: 10 June 1981 (age 45)
- Place of birth: Bucaramanga, Colombia
- Height: 1.78 m (5 ft 10 in)
- Position: Midfielder

Team information
- Current team: Wilstermann Cooperativas (manager)

Senior career*
Years	Team	Apps	(Gls)
2000	Atlético Bucaramanga		
2001	San José	3	(1)
2002	Boyacá Chico		
2003	Chiapas	10	(4)
2004	Valledupar		
2005	Deportivo Pasto		
2006	Atlético Huila		
2007	Real Cartagena		
2008	Alianza Petrolera		
2009	Bnei Sakhnin	10	(0)
2010–2011	Deportivo Pasto		
2012–2013	Atlético Bucaramanga	12	(1)
2012	→ Unión Magdalena (loan)	11	(0)

Managerial career
- 2018–2024: Atlético Bucaramanga (youth)
- 2019: Atlético Bucaramanga (caretaker)
- 2020: Atlético Bucaramanga (caretaker)
- 2021: Atlético Bucaramanga (caretaker)
- 2021: Atlético Bucaramanga (caretaker)
- 2024–: Wilstermann Cooperativas
- * Club domestic league appearances and goals

Sergio Novoa Rodríguez (10 June 1981) is a Colombian football manager and former player who played as a defender. He is the current manager of Bolivian club Wilstermann Cooperativas.

== Coaching career ==
=== Atlético Bucaramanga ===
Having formerly been in charge of the U17 and U20 squads of Atlético Bucaramanga, Novoa was appointed manager of the club's first team on 10 September 2019 after Hernán Torres was fired. He was replaced by José 'Willy' Manuel Rodríguez in early November 2019 and then became a part of the new manager's technical staff. Willy was fired in mid-February and Novoa took charge of the team again, this time as a caretaker manager. Two days later, Guillermo Sanguinetti was hired.

On 15 February 2021, Novoa was named caretaker manager for the third time, until the new coach was hired on 23 February.
