= José Arastey =

Spanish footballer

Personal information
- Full name: José Arastey Eres
- Date of birth: 30 June 1966 (age 60)
- Place of birth: Massamagrell, Spain

Team information
- Current team: Deportes Tolima (youth manager)

Managerial career
- Years: Team
- Masamagrell (youth)
- San Lorenzo de Masamagrell
- El Puig
- 1999–2001: Villarreal (youth)
- 2001–20XX: Torre Levante (youth)
- Torre Levante
- 20XX–2008: Valencia (youth)
- 2008–2009: Levante (women)
- 2009–2010: Valencia (youth)
- 2010–2011: Ribarroja
- 2012: Eldense
- 2015–2017: Torre Levante (youth)
- 2018: Atlético Moncadense
- 2018–2019: Envigado (youth)
- 2019–2021: Envigado
- 2023–: Deportes Tolima (youth)
- 2023: Deportes Tolima (caretaker)

José Arastey Eres (born 30 June 1966) is a Spanish football manager. He is the current manager of the under-20 squad of Colombian club Deportes Tolima.

== Career ==
Born in Massamagrell, Valencian Community, Arastey began his career with hometown side UD Masamagrell's youth setup. He then worked at CD San Lorenzo de Masamagrell and El Puig CE before joining Villarreal CF's youth setup in 1999.

Arastey subsequently worked with CF Torre Levante (where he also managed the first team) and Valencia CF's youth squads before being named manager of Levante UD Femenino on 28 July 2008. He left the club in the following year, and subsequently returned to Valencia to take over the Juvenil B squad.

In 2010, Arastey was appointed manager of Ribarroja CF in Tercera División. He was sacked in March of the following year, and spent nearly ten months unemployed before joining the youth organization chart of CD Eldense. He was named manager of the latter club on 4 July, but resigned on 5 November.

In 2015, Arastey returned to Torre Levante as a manager of the Juvenil B squad, taking over the Juvenil A side in December. In June 2016, he started working with Ismael Rescalvo at Envigado FC in Colombia, while still in charge of Torre Levante, but resigned from the Spanish side on 1 February 2017,

In 2018, after a brief period in charge of CF Atlético Moncadense, Arastey moved to Envigado permanently, initially as a manager of the under-20 squad. In September 2019, he was named interim manager of the latter's main squad, being definitely appointed manager in December. He remained as manager of Envigado until 24 March 2021, when he left the club on a mutual agreement.

Arastey returned to Colombia in July 2023, being appointed as manager of the under-20 squad at Deportes Tolima. On 7 September, he was named caretaker manager of Deportes Tolima's first team following the resignation of Juan Cruz Real.
