= La Equidad =

Association football club in Colombia

- Full name: Club Deportivo La Equidad
- Nicknames: Aseguradores (Insurers); El Equipo Asegurador (The Insurer Team); El Equipo Verde de Bogotá (Bogotá's Green Team); El Verde Capitalino (The Capital Green); El Equipo de la Mayoría (The Majority Team)
- Founded: 1 December 1982; 43 years ago
- Dissolved: 10 December 2025; 11 months ago
- Ground: Estadio Metropolitano de Techo
- Capacity: 10,000
- Owner: NX Football Colombia
- President: Nicolás Maya
- Head coach: Daniel Gómez (caretaker)
- League: Categoría Primera A
- 2025: Primera A, 20th of 20
Home colours	Away colours	Third colours

Club Deportivo La Equidad, also known as La Equidad, was a professional Colombian football team based in Bogotá, that last played in the Categoría Primera A. They played their home games at the Metropolitano de Techo stadium.

== History ==
La Equidad was founded in 1982 by its namesake company Seguros La Equidad, and immediately after its foundation it entered the Olaya Tournament, a traditional amateur football tournament in Bogotá. La Equidad's first appearance in the 1982–83 edition of the tournament was supported by Independiente Santa Fe, which loaned a manager and several players of their youth ranks to take part in the competition, which was ultimately won by them. In 1993, La Equidad was officially constituted as an amateur club and joined the Bogotá Football League (Liga de Fútbol de Bogotá), entering the Categoría Primera C as well as the different youth tournaments organized by the regional amateur football league.

In 2003, La Equidad turned into a professional club and changed its name to Club Deportivo La Equidad, joining DIMAYOR and entering the Colombian second tier competition Categoría Primera B. In their first participation in Primera B, they made it to the semi-finals after an eighth place finish in the regular season.

La Equidad earned promotion to Categoría Primera A by winning the Primera B tournament in 2006 with Alexis García as manager. The Aseguradores won both of the tournaments making up the 2006 Primera B season, clinching their promotion as well as the second tier championship on 4 November 2006 after a 1–1 draw with Centauros at the Estadio Manuel Calle Lombana in Villavicencio.

La Equidad played their first match in Primera A on 4 February 2007, losing to Atlético Nacional by a 4–3 score at the Estadio Alfonso López Pumarejo in Bogotá. They got their first victory in the top tier in the ninth round of the tournament, a 2–0 win over Real Cartagena on 25 March. Their 2007 Apertura campaign was poor, as they ended in last place with only two wins in 18 matches and were deemed as main candidates for relegation at the end of the season. However, their fortunes improved greatly in the Finalización tournament, in which they were able to top the table for several rounds and advanced to their first semi-final stage thanks to a second place in the first stage of the tournament, avoiding relegation in the process. In the semi-finals, the team managed by Alexis García won Group B ahead of Boyacá Chicó, Deportivo Pasto and favorites Deportes Tolima to face the defending champions Atlético Nacional in the finals. The first leg, played at Estadio El Campín, was won by Atlético Nacional by a 3–0 score, whilst the second leg played at Estadio Atanasio Girardot in Medellín ended in a scoreless draw which confirmed La Equidad's first runner-up finish in the top flight.

In 2008, La Equidad won the Copa Colombia by beating Once Caldas over two legs in the final, and qualified for the 2009 Copa Sudamericana. Thanks to this title as well as its consistent performances in its first two seasons in the top tier, La Equidad came to be among the top 100 football clubs in the world according to the rankings of the International Federation of Football History and Statistics (IFFHS) in 2009.

La Equidad made it to their second final series in the 2010 Apertura tournament, facing Junior. Although they won the first leg played in Bogotá 1–0 with a goal by Peruvian footballer Renzo Sheput, they were unable to hold on to this advantage and in the return leg in Barranquilla they capitulated by a 3–1 score with which Junior won the title and La Equidad had to settle for another runner-up finish. One year later, the Asegurador side once again advanced to the finals, facing Atlético Nacional for the 2011 Apertura title, just like in 2007. This time, the first leg was won by La Equidad by a 2–1 score, while Atlético Nacional were leading the second leg by a 2–0 score until a late goal by Roberto Polo helped La Equidad tie the aggregate score and drag the series to a penalty shoot-out which was won by the Verdolaga squad.

The consistent domestic performances of the Asegurador side allowed them to qualify for the Copa Sudamericana for three seasons in a row (2011 to 2013). The latter one was La Equidad's first deep campaign in the competition, as they managed to advance to the round of 16 by knocking out Trujillanos from Venezuela and Cobreloa from Chile before losing to Argentine side Vélez Sarsfield. This performance was surpassed in 2019, in which the team advanced to the quarter-finals where they were knocked out by Atlético Mineiro.

On 15 January 2025, it was reported that 99% of the club had been acquired by the American-based consortium Tylis–Porter Group, led by real estate investor Al Tylis and Club Necaxa executive Sam Porter, and also backed by actors Eva Longoria, Ryan Reynolds, and Rob McElhenney (the latter two co-owners of Wrexham A.F.C.) as well as MLB pitcher Justin Verlander and his wife, model Kate Upton, and NYU professor and entrepreneur Scott Galloway. Talks to purchase the club started in the second half of 2024, with the takeover being finalised in early 2025. According to the terms of the operation, in which the former owners Seguros La Equidad decided to keep the symbols, colors and identity to themselves, the club would change its name and colors by January 2026, with the 2025 season being the last one the club played as La Equidad. The club's last match under that name was played on 12 November 2025, in which it defeated Deportivo Pereira 4–0 at Estadio Metropolitano de Techo. In its final season in Categoría Primera A, La Equidad placed last in the aggregate table.

On 10 December 2025, Internacional de Bogotá was presented as the new club that replaced La Equidad.

== Honours ==
=== Domestic ===
- Categoría Primera A
  - Runners-up (3): 2007–II, 2010–I, 2011–I
- Categoría Primera B
  - Winners (1): 2006
- Copa Colombia
  - Winners (1): 2008

== Performance in CONMEBOL competitions ==
- Copa Sudamericana: 7 appearances

2009: First stage
2011: Second stage
2012: First stage
2013: Round of 16
2019: Quarter-finals
2021: Group stage
2022: First stage

== Managers ==
- (Colombia) Fáber López (2003–2005)
- (Colombia) Alexis García (January 2006 – December 2012)
- (Colombia) Néstor Otero (January 2013 – September 2014)
- (Colombia) Fáber López (September 2014 – December 2014)
- (Colombia) Santiago Escobar (January 2015 – April 2016)
- (Colombia) Arturo Boyacá (April 2016 – December 2017)
- (Colombia) Luis Fernando Suárez (January 2018 – December 2018)
- (Colombia) Humberto Sierra (January 2019 – August 2019)
- (Colombia) Luis Guillermo Rivera (September 2019 – December 2019)
- (Colombia) Alexis García (January 2020 – February 2025)
- (Colombia) Jhon Jairo Bodmer (March 2025 – May 2025)
- (Spain) Diego Merino (June 2025 – October 2025)
- (Colombia) Daniel Gómez (caretaker, October 2025 – November 2025)

Source: Worldfootball.net
