= Alberto Gamero =

Colombian footballer (born 1964)

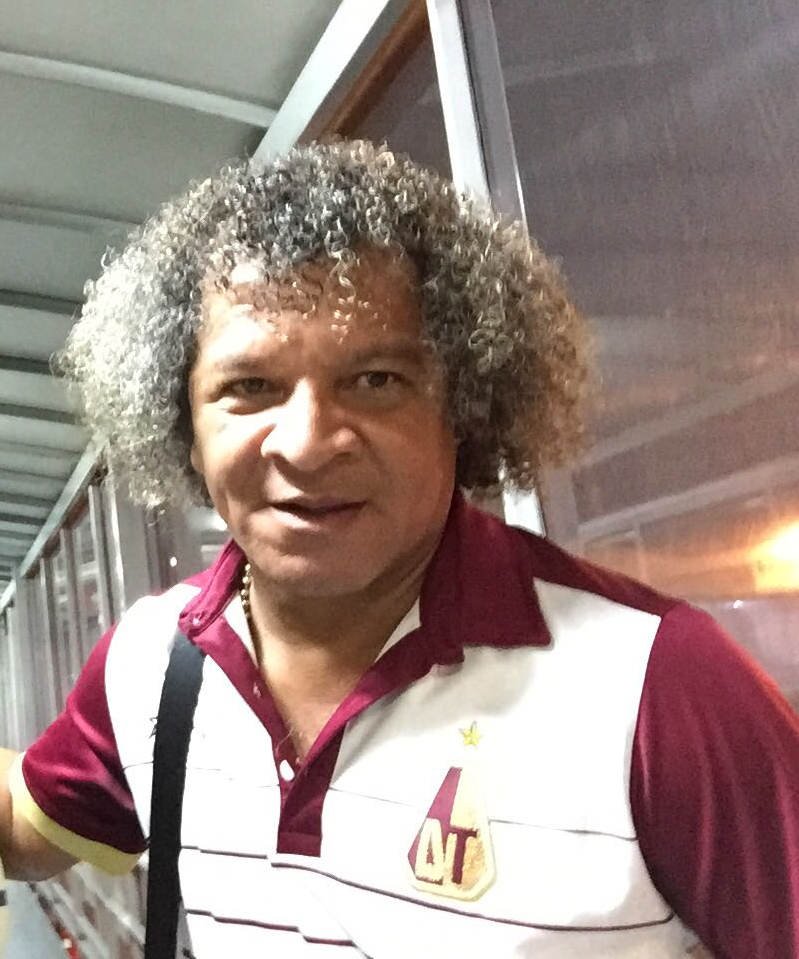
- Gamero in 2016

Personal information
- Full name: Alberto Miguel Gamero Morillo
- Date of birth: 3 February 1964 (age 62)
- Place of birth: Santa Marta, Colombia
- Height: 1.68 m (5 ft 6 in)
- Position: Defender

Team information
- Current team: Millonarios (manager)

Senior career*
Years	Team	Apps	(Gls)
1982–1987	Unión Magdalena		
1988–1991	Millonarios	96	(2)
1992	Envigado	33	(0)
1993–1994	Independiente Medellín	38	(0)
1995–1997	Unión Magdalena		
1997–1999	Deportivo Unicosta	48	(1)

Managerial career
- 2001–2002: Boyacá Chicó (assistant)
- 2003: Chía
- 2004: Bogotá
- 2005–2006: Boyacá Chicó (assistant)
- 2006–2013: Boyacá Chicó
- 2014: Itagüí
- 2014–2016: Deportes Tolima
- 2017: Junior
- 2017–2019: Deportes Tolima
- 2020–2024: Millonarios
- 2025–2026: Deportivo Cali
- 2026–: Millonarios
- * Club domestic league appearances and goals

Alberto Miguel Gamero Morillo (born 3 February 1964), sometimes nicknamed Tito Gamero, is a Colombian professional football manager, currently in charge of Millonarios.

On 28 September 2023, with a 2–0 victory against Alianza Petrolera in the quarterfinals of the 2023 Copa Colombia, Gamero reached 200 games in charge of Millonarios.

== Honours ==
=== Player ===
Millonarios

- Categoría Primera A: 1988

=== Manager ===
Boyacá Chicó

- Categoría Primera A: 2008 Apertura

Deportes Tolima

- Copa Colombia: 2014
- Categoría Primera A: 2018 Apertura

Millonarios

- Categoría Primera A: 2023 Apertura
- Copa Colombia: 2022
- Superliga Colombiana: 2024

== See also ==
- List of football managers with the most matches
