= Lucas Pusineri =

Argentine footballer

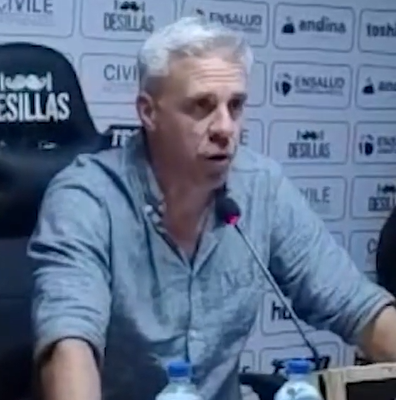
- Pusineri in 2025

Personal information
- Full name: Lucas Andrés Pusineri Bignone
- Date of birth: 16 July 1976 (age 50)
- Place of birth: Buenos Aires, Argentina
- Height: 1.79 m (5 ft 10 1/2 in)
- Position: Midfielder

Senior career*
Years	Team	Apps	(Gls)
1997–1999	Almagro	61	(20)
1999–2002	San Lorenzo	63	(11)
2002–2003	Independiente	32	(10)
2003–2004	Saturn Ramenskoye	9	(4)
2004–2005	Independiente	38	(6)
2006	River Plate	8	(0)
2007–2010	Independiente	70	(3)
2010–2011	Platense	34	(1)

Managerial career
- 2018: Cúcuta Deportivo
- 2019: Deportivo Cali
- 2020–2021: Independiente
- 2022–2023: Atlético Tucumán
- 2023: Tigre
- 2025: Atlético Tucumán
- 2026: Central Córdoba
- * Club domestic league appearances and goals

Lucas Andrés Pusineri Bignone (born 16 July 1976) is an Argentine football manager and former player.

A midfielder, Pusineri began his career with Almagro in 1997, and enjoyed successful spells at San Lorenzo and Independiente. He retired with Platense in 2011, and subsequently became a manager.

== Footballing career ==
Pusineri started his professional football career in 1998 with a local club in Almagro, he had an impressive season of scoring 11 goals in 29 games, he was quickly signed by San Lorenzo where he helped the club to win the Clausura 2001 championship.

During his three years with Club Atletico San Lorenzo de Almagro, Pusineri made 61 appearances and scored 11 goals. In 2002, Pusineri was snapped up by Independiente, where he played a part in their championship season in Apertura 2002. In 2003, he moved to Russian Premier League side FC Saturn. After failing to make any impact on European soil, Pusineri decided to move back to Independiente in season 2004/2005.

In 2006, Pusineri was signed by Daniel Passarella, who took over from Reinaldo Merlo as the manager of River Plate but returned once again to Independiente in 2007.

== Manager career ==
During the 2013-14 Championship, Pusineri worked with Adrián Domenech as technical assistant of Claudio Borghi for Argentinos Juniors.

Pusineri started his managerial career with Cúcuta Deportivo of the Primera B of Colombia as head coach.

== Honours ==
San Lorenzo

- Primera División (1): 2001 Clausura
- Copa Mercosur (1): 2001

Independiente

- Primera División (1): 2002 Apertura

Cúcuta Deportivo

- Categoría Primera B (1): 2018
