= Óscar Upegui =

Colombian footballer and manager (born 1969)

Personal information
- Full name: Óscar Francisco Upegui Pereira
- Date of birth: 20 September 1969 (age 57)
- Place of birth: Piedecuesta, Colombia
- Position: Defender

Youth career
- Atlético Bucaramanga

Senior career*
Years	Team	Apps	(Gls)
1989–1995	Atlético Bucaramanga		
1995–2000	Santa Fe	165	(1)
2001	Atlético Bucaramanga		
2002–2004	Deportivo Pasto	109	(1)

Managerial career
- 2005–2007: Atlético Bucaramanga (youth)
- 2007: Atlético Bucaramanga (interim)
- 2008: Alianza Petrolera
- 2011–2012: Cúcuta Deportivo (youth)
- 2013–2014: Atlético Bucaramanga (youth)
- 2013: Atlético Bucaramanga (interim)
- 2014–2015: Alianza Petrolera (assistant)
- 2015–2016: Alianza Petrolera
- 2016: Chorrillo
- 2018: Chorrillo
- 2018: CD Universitario
- 2019: Jaguares de Córdoba
- 2021: Atlético Bucaramanga
- * Club domestic league appearances and goals

Óscar Francisco Upegui Pereira (born 29 September 1969) is a Colombian football manager and former player who played as a defender.
