= Luis Guillermo Rivera =

Colombian footballer (born 1975)

Personal information
- Full name: Luis Guillermo Rivera Martinez
- Date of birth: June 11, 1975 (age 51)
- Place of birth: Bogotá, Colombia
- Height: 1.78 m (5 ft 10 in)
- Position: Attacking midfielder

Senior career*
Years	Team	Apps	(Gls)
1995–1996	Deportivo Pereira		
1997–2000	Millonarios		
2001–2003	Deportivo Cali		
2003	Deportivo Pasto		
2004	Deportes Tolima		
2005	LDU de Loja	26	(4)
2006–2009	Emelec	98	(16)
- * Club domestic league appearances and goals as of 31 December 2009 ‡ National team caps and goals as of 28 February 2008

Luis Guillermo Rivera Martínez (born June 11, 1975) is a retired Colombian footballer who played as an attacking midfielder for Emelec in the Ecuadorian Football League.

== Personal life ==
Rivera was born in Bogotá, Colombia but he grew up there and also in Cali. He is married to Claudia and has two children, Andrea and David. His father, Guillermo Rivera and his uncle Abimael Martinez were also amateur footballers and they both supported him and advised him about the game.

Education was very important for him; he finished high school and studied to be a physical trainer at the university. When he is not doing sports he likes to play chess, because it exercises the mind, he says.

He now lives in Guayaquil with his wife and kids, and he has declared publicly that when he retires from professional football he intends to open a football academy in Bogotá.

== Playing style ==
Rivera started his career as a striker, but in time, his coaches transitioned him to primarily play as an attacking midfielder. Since his arrival at Emelec he has also played as a midfielder and as a defensive midfielder. He is known for his technique and scoring ability.

== Club career ==
He made his debut in professional football at age 19 playing as a substitute for Deportivo Pereira in a match against Atlético Nacional. Deportivo Pereira was losing the game by 2 goals, and Rivera came up to play as a striker, he ended up making two assist for his team that helped tie the match.

He played for several teams in Colombia including his beloved Millonarios where he played for 3 years. In 2005, he was signed by small unknown Ecuadorian side Liga de Loja, where he had a great performance until an injury took him out for most of the season, when he was able to play again it was too late for his team that was relegated to Ecuadorian Serie B.

His good performance for Liga de Loja, attracted Ecuadorian giants Emelec that signed him in 2006 and he quickly became a fundamental part of Emelec's game. He played in 36 games that year and scored 12 goals that helped Emelec to qualify to the Copa Libertadores as a runner up in the Ecuadorian Serie A league.

== Colombia and Ecuador ==
Rivera was called up to represent his country for the 2002 FIFA World Cup qualifiers. He is now an Ecuadorian citizen after living in the country for 3 consecutive years.
