= Humberto Sierra =

Colombian footballer (born 1960)

Humberto de Jesús Sierra Sánchez (born July 21, 1960, in Envigado, Colombia) is a Colombian football coach and former player who played as a midfielder.

== Coaching career ==
Sierra was an assistant coach on the staff of the Mexican men's national soccer team that defeated Germany in the group stage of the 2018 World Cup before advancing to the knockout round. In 2019 he served as the head coach of Club Deportivo La Equidad Seguros (also known as "La Equidad"), a Colombian football team based in Bogotá and playing in the Categoría Primera A (also known as "Liga Águila"). In October 2020, Sierra Sánchez was hired to join the coaching staff for his hometown team, Deportivo Independiente Medellín (also a member of Liga Águila Primera A).

== Teams ==
- América de Cali 1980–1984
- Atlético Nacional 1985–1987
- Independiente Medellín 1988
- Deportes La Serena 1989–1990
- Independiente Medellín 1991–1993

== Honours ==
'América de Cali

- Colombian Primera División: 1982, 1983 and 1984
