= Guillermo Sanguinetti =

Uruguayan footballer and manager (born 1966)

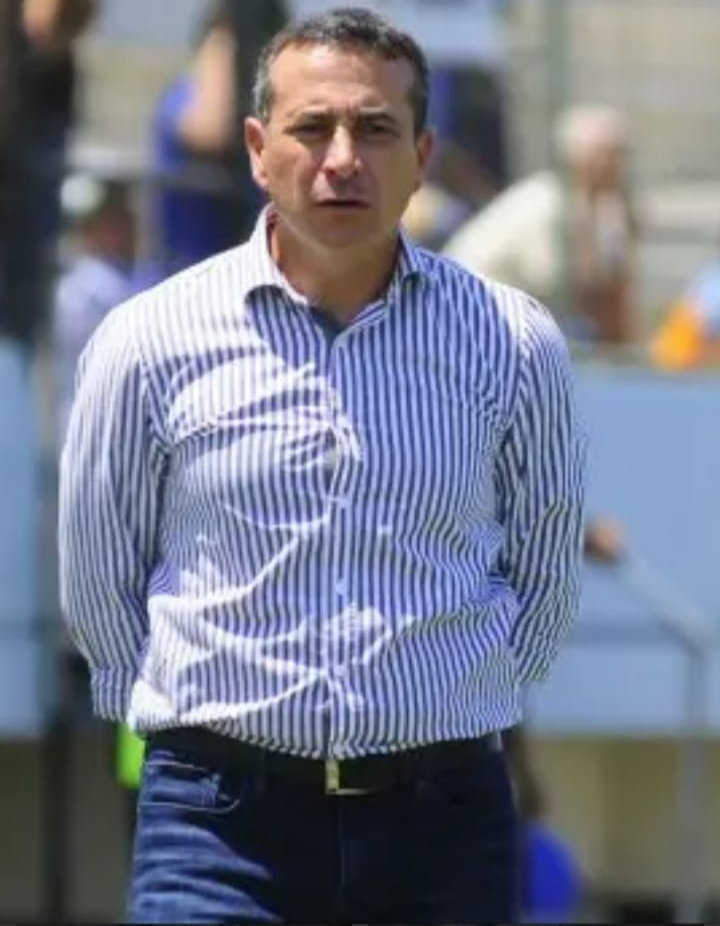
- Sanguinetti in 2021

Personal information
- Full name: Guillermo Óscar Sanguinetti Giordano
- Date of birth: 21 June 1966 (age 60)
- Place of birth: Montevideo, Uruguay
- Position: Defender

Team information
- Current team: Macará (manager)

Senior career*
Years	Team	Apps	(Gls)
1985–1986	Nacional	55	(4)
1986–1987	Central Español	20	(0)
1987–1988	Montevideo Wanderers	80	(2)
1989–1990	Sud América	20	(0)
1990–1991	Racing de Montevideo	55	(1)
1991–2003	Gimnasia LP	403	(32)

International career
1991–1997	Uruguay	20	(1)

Managerial career
- 2003: Danubio (assistant)
- 2004–2005: Olimpo (assistant)
- 2005–2006: Argentinos Juniors (assistant)
- 2006–2007: Peñarol (assistant)
- 2007–2008: Gimnasia LP
- 2009: Cerro
- 2010–2011: Sportivo Luqueño
- 2012: Bella Vista
- 2012–2013: Cúcuta Deportivo
- 2014–2015: Alianza Lima
- 2016: River Ecuador
- 2016–2018: Delfín
- 2018: Deportivo Cuenca
- 2018–2019: Santa Fe
- 2019: Cúcuta Deportivo
- 2020: Atlético Bucaramanga
- 2021: Deportivo Cuenca
- 2022: Delfín
- 2023: Sport Boys
- 2024: UTC
- 2025–: Macará
- * Club domestic league appearances and goals

Guillermo Óscar Sanguinetti Giordano (born 21 June 1966 in Montevideo) is a Uruguayan football manager and former player who played as a defender. He is the current manager of Ecuadorian club Macará.

== Career ==
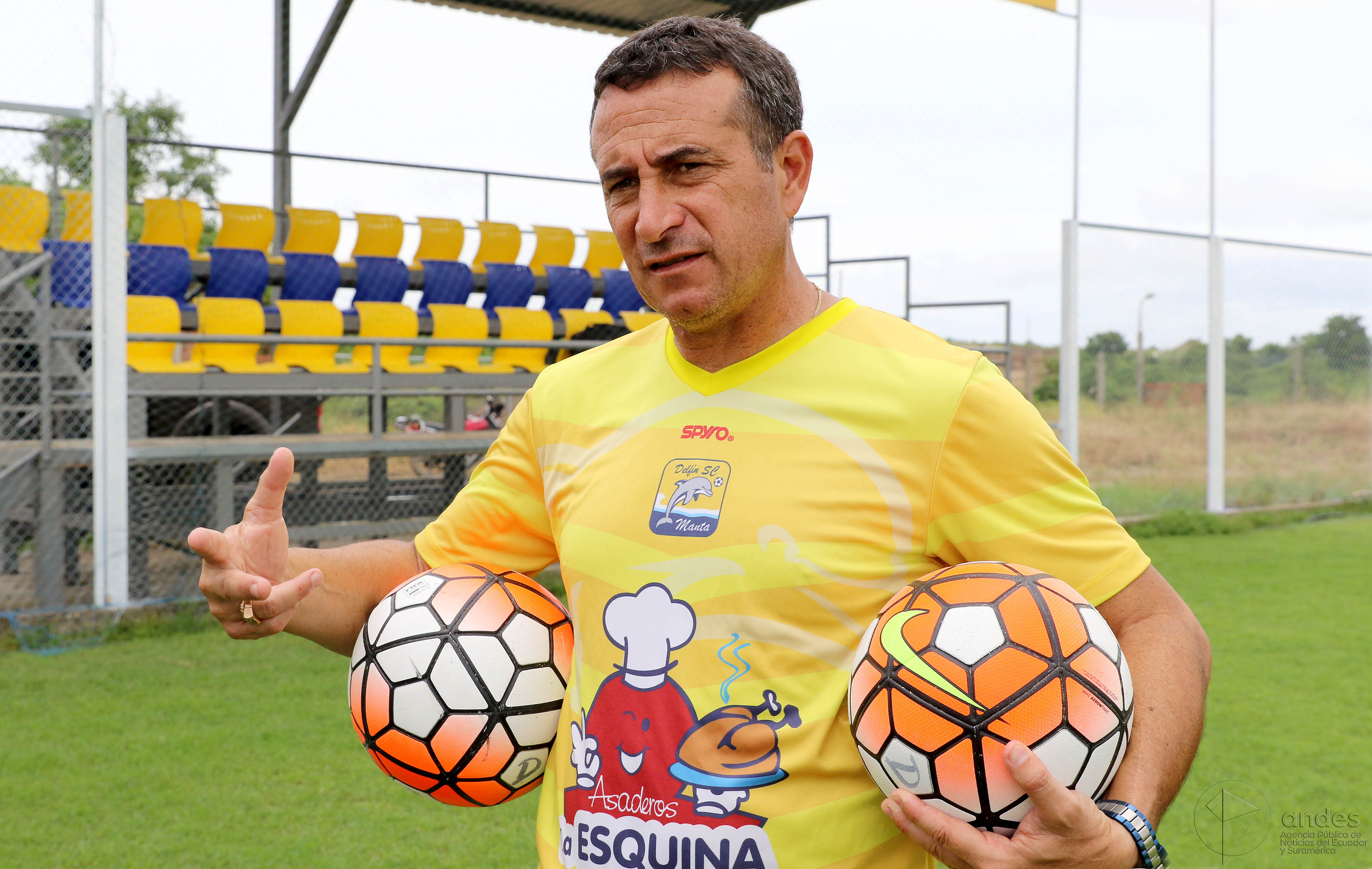
Sanguinetti with Delfín in 2017

Having made his debut on 5 May 1991 against the United States (0–1), he obtained a total number of twenty international caps for his national team, scoring one goal, in the 1990s.

Sanguinetti played for a number of Uruguayan football clubs before joining Gimnasia y Esgrima de La Plata in Argentina where he played 390 games, scoring 32 goals between 1991 and 2003. He was nicknamed "Topo".

In December 2007, he was given the job of manager of Gimnasia y Esgrima de La Plata, but on 29 September 2008, the day after Gimnasia L.P. lost 3–1 against their archrivals Estudiantes L.P., Sanguinetti resigned as head coach of the team. El Topo was dismissed from football at age 37. With 383 matches in Argentina and 18 at International became the player with most appearances in the history of Gimnasia La Plata and a symbol of the club Platense. People cheered in his last game against Hurricane and responded with an inscription on the shirt as a tribute: "From Mole to Lobo in 12 years." During his tenure with the club scored 30 goals.

On 3 January 2008 again Gymnastics Technical Director of the hand of the new President Walter Gisande.1 directed against Gimnasia in 28 Argentine Football Official matches with 6 wins, 9 draws and 13 defeats. On 13 August 2009 took over as new coach closed on 8 December 2010 took over as coach of Sportivo Luqueno, A is designated half of 2012 Bella Vista coach his country, replacing Diego Alonso which reaches located in the top of the table at the beginning of the 2nd championship 2012.

In 2014, he was the coach of Alianza Lima. After a great start, winning the Inca Cup, the Apertura and Clausura of Primera División (Peru) was considered above good and the team qualified to the Copa Libertadores. The team was eliminated by Huracán in a 4-0 defeat.

After that, things went downhill for the coach, until he resigned from his position on 18 May 2015.

== Career statistics ==
=== International ===
Appearances and goals by national team and year
National team	Year	Apps	Goals
Uruguay	1991	9	0
Uruguay	1992	2	1
Uruguay	1993	4	0
Uruguay	1994	0	0
Uruguay	1995	0	0
Uruguay	1996	3	0
Uruguay	1997	2	0
Total		20	1

Scores and results list Uruguay's goal tally first, score column indicates score after each Sanguinetti goal.

List of international goals scored by Guillermo Sanguinetti
No.	Date	Venue	Opponent	Score	Result	Competition
1	2 August 1992	Estadio Centenario, Montevideo, Uruguay	Costa Rica	1–0	2–1	Friendly

== Honours ==
- 2014 Torneo del Inca- 2014
- Qualified Libertadores Cup 2015
