= Juan Cruz Real =

Argentine footballer

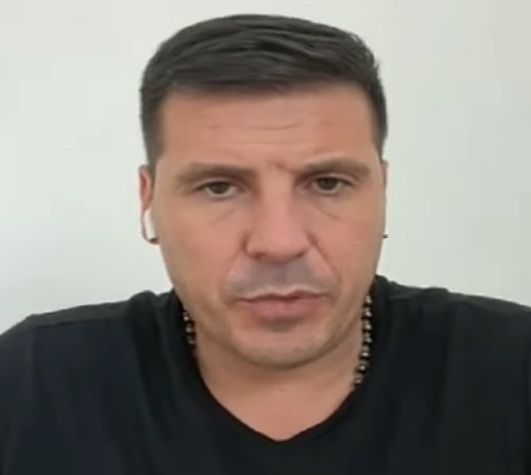
- Real in 2021

Personal information
- Date of birth: 8 October 1976 (age 50)
- Place of birth: Tandil, Argentina
- Position: Midfielder

Team information
- Current team: Nicaragua (manager)

Senior career*
Years	Team	Apps	(Gls)
1995–1996	Independiente	8	(0)
1997	Deportivo Español	11	(0)
1998	Millonarios	10	(1)
1999	Arsenal de Sarandí	28	(3)
1999	Independiente Rivadavia	22	(1)
2000	Brown de Arrecifes	18	(5)
2002	Roulado	17	(7)
2003–2004	Unión San Felipe	23	(6)
2004	Brampton Hitmen	10	(1)
2005	Hamilton Thunder		
2006–2009	North York Astros	19	(0)

Managerial career
- 2007–2012: Clarkson Sheridan SC (technical Director)
- 2012–2014: Mississauga SC (technical Director)
- 2014–2015: IMG Academy (U19)
- 2015–2016: IMG Academy (U18)
- 2015: Belén
- 2016: Olimpo (assistant)
- 2016–2017: Estudiantes de Mérida
- 2017–2018: Alianza Petrolera
- 2019–2020: Jaguares
- 2020–2021: América de Cali
- 2022: Junior
- 2023: Deportes Tolima
- 2024: Belgrano
- 2026: Universidad de Concepción
- 2026–: Nicaragua
- * Club domestic league appearances and goals

Juan Cruz Real (born 8 October 1976) is an Argentine football manager and former player who played as a midfielder.

Real had numerous stints in South American leagues, and finished off his career in the Canadian Professional Soccer League. He is currently manager of the Nicaragua national team.

== Playing career ==
Real began his career in his native country with Argentinian giants Independiente. In 1997, he signed with Deportivo Español, and the following season he went to Colombia to play for Millonarios F.C. In 1999, he returned to Argentina to sign with Arsenal de Sarandí. Soon after he featured in the lower Argentinian leagues with Independiente Rivadavia, and Almirante Brown de Arrecifes, winning the Torneo Argentino A in 1999. Cruz Real had a stint overseas in the island of Haiti with Roulado in 2002, and returning to the South American continent in 2003 with Unión San Felipe of Chile.

In 2004, he went once more overseas to Canada to sign with the Brampton Hitmen of the Canadian Professional Soccer League. He made his debut for the club on September 10, 2004, in a match against Toronto Supra. He helped Brampton secure a post-season berth by finishing fourth in the Western Conference. He featured in the wildcard playoff match against Toronto Croatia, but were eliminated by a score of 3–1.

The following year he signed with division rivals Hamilton Thunder. His achievements with Hamilton were clinching the division title, and qualifying for the post-season. He featured in the semifinal playoff match against Oakville Blue Devils, but lost by a score of 2–0. In 2009, he had a stint with North York Astros in the Canadian Soccer League.

== Managerial career ==
Cruz Real was named the manager for Deportes Tolima in 2023. In 2024, he returned to Argentina to be named the manager of Club Atlético Belgrano. After nine months with Belgrano, it was mutually decided to relieve him.

In December 2025, Real was appointed as manager of Universidad de Concepción in the Chilean Primera División. He left them in March 2026.

In April 2026 he was appointed as manager of the Nicaragua national team.
