= Alexis García =

Colombian footballer (born 1960)

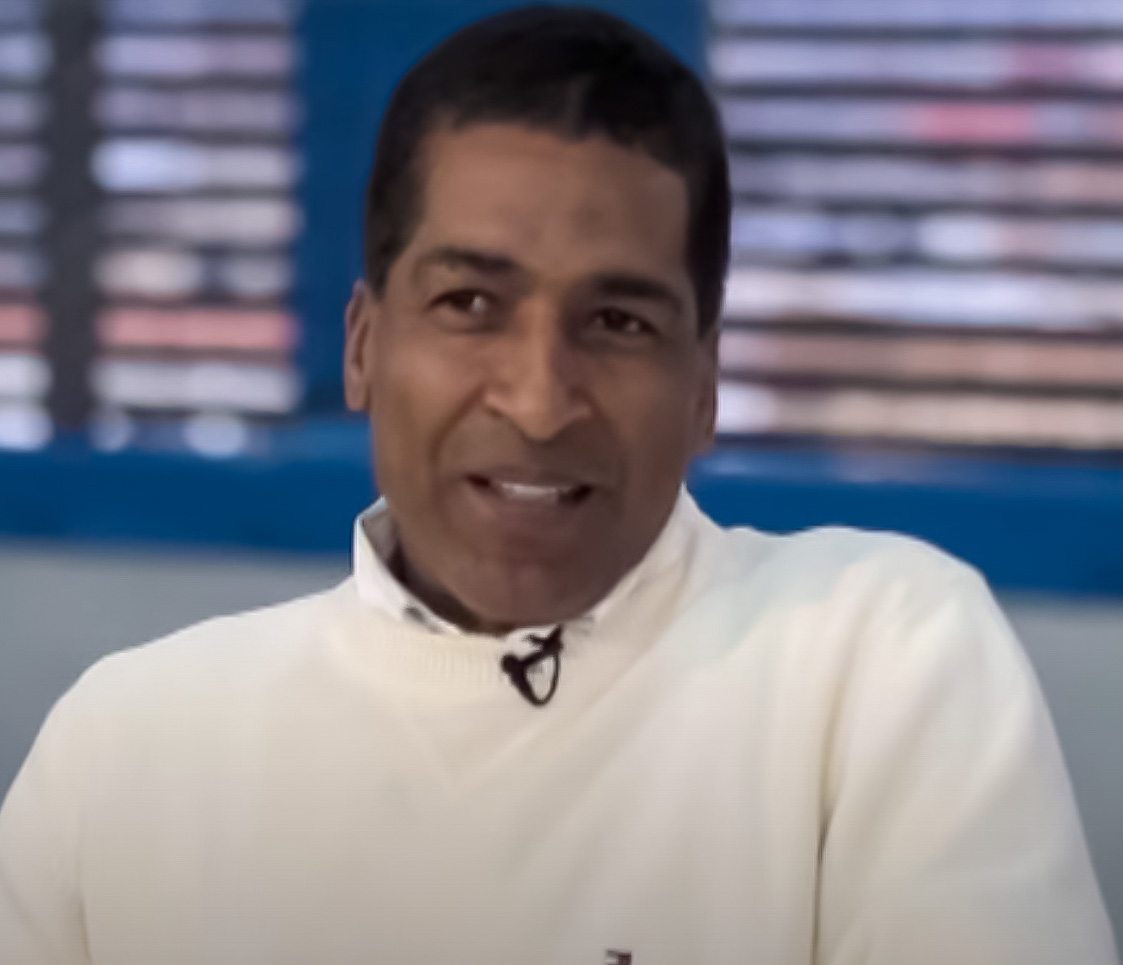
- García in 2014

Personal information
- Full name: Alexis Enrique García Vega
- Date of birth: 21 July 1960 (age 66)
- Place of birth: Quibdó, Colombia
- Height: 1.71 m (5 ft 7 in)
- Position: Central midfielder

Senior career*
Years	Team	Apps	(Gls)
1980–1986	Once Caldas	233	(18)
1987–1998	Atlético Nacional	443	(57)
Total		676	(75)

International career
1980–1987	Colombia Olympic	8	(1)
1988–1993	Colombia	25	(2)

Managerial career
- 1999: Once Caldas
- 2002–2003: Atlético Nacional
- 2003–2004: Deportivo Pereira
- 2004–2005: Atlético Bucaramanga
- 2005–2006: Centauros Villavicencio
- 2006–2012: La Equidad
- 2013–2014: Atlético Junior
- 2014: Fortaleza
- 2016: Santa Fe
- 2019: Deportivo Pasto
- 2020–2025: La Equidad
- 2025: Unión Magdalena
- * Club domestic league appearances and goals

Alexis Enrique García Vega (born 21 July 1960) is a Colombian retired football midfielder.

== Club career ==
Along with seven more siblings, he grew up in barrio La Floresta of Medellín where he started his career playing for the Antioquia Football Selection. In 1980, he joined Once Caldas of Manizales and the same year he was called to play for the Colombia Olympic football team for the Moscow Olympic Games. In 1987, he joined Atlético Nacional of Medellín where he remained until his retirement in 1998. Known as "The Great Captain", Alexis Garcia was considered one of the Colombia's best midfielders and a crowd's favorite in a time when the Colombian football was starting to shine at the international level. In 1989 Garcia led Atlético Nacional to become Copa Libertadores champions. In 1988 Garcia debuted with the senior Colombia national football team against Canada, a game that the Colombians won 3–0. Because of misunderstandings with national team coach Francisco Maturana Alexis Garcia missed the 1990 FIFA World Cup in Italy. His last game for the Colombia national team was in August 1993 against Paraguay. Garcia played a total of 25 games for Colombia and scored a total of 2 goals.

== International career ==
García made 24 appearances for the senior Colombia national football team from 1988 to 1993, including participating in the 1993 Copa América.

He also played for Colombia at the 1980 Olympic Games in Moscow.

== Honours ==
=== Player ===
Atlético Nacional

- Categoría Primera A (2): 1991, 1994
- Copa Libertadores (1): 1989

=== Manager ===
La Equidad

- Categoria Primera B (1): 2006
- Copa Colombia (1): 2008
