= 2024 Liga DIMAYOR =

Categoría Primera A season

Liga BetPlay Dimayor
- Season: 2024
- Dates: 19 January – 22 December 2024
- Champions: Apertura: Atlético Bucaramanga (1st title); Finalización: Atlético Nacional (18th title)
- Relegated: Jaguares; Patriotas
- Copa Libertadores: Atlético Bucaramanga; Atlético Nacional; Deportes Tolima; Santa Fe
- Copa Sudamericana: Millonarios; Once Caldas; Junior; América de Cali
- Matches: 432
- Goals: 937 (2.17 per match)
- Top goalscorer: Apertura: Carlos Bacca and Hugo Rodallega (12 goals each); Finalización: Daniel Moreno (17 goals)
- Biggest home win: Millonarios 5–0 Ind. Medellín (21 January); Atl. Nacional 5–0 Santa Fe (20 November)
- Biggest away win: Alianza 0–4 Atl. Bucaramanga (14 November); Boyacá Chicó 1–5 Millonarios (14 November)
- Highest scoring: Atl. Nacional 6–2 Boyacá Chicó (29 September)

The 2024 Categoría Primera A season (officially known as the 2024 Liga BetPlay Dimayor season for sponsorship purposes) was the 77th season of the Categoría Primera A, Colombia's top-flight football league. The season began on 19 January and ended on 22 December 2024.

Two tournaments (Apertura and Finalización) were played in the season, each one of them being an independent championship. In the Torneo Apertura, Atlético Bucaramanga were the champions, defeating Santa Fe on kicks from the penalty mark after a 3–3 draw on aggregate in the finals to claim their first league title, while in the Torneo Finalización Atlético Nacional were the champions, claiming their eighteenth league title after beating Deportes Tolima 3–1 on aggregate in the finals. Junior were the defending champions, having won the 2023 Finalización tournament.

== Format changes ==
The competition format for this season was approved by the Extraordinary Assembly of DIMAYOR on 12 December 2023, which decided to keep the same system used in the previous seasons, with two tournaments (Apertura and Finalización) of three stages each: a first stage in which the 20 teams play each other once (with the fixtures being reversed for the Finalización tournament), a semi-final stage (cuadrangulares) played by the top eight teams from the previous stage and a double-legged final series. The Assembly also decided to remove the regional derbies round that is usually played halfway into the first stage of each tournament as well as a change to the distribution of international berths, with all four Copa Libertadores berths being awarded through league performance (two to the champions of both tournaments and the remaining two to the best-placed teams in the aggregate table), instead of one of those being awarded to the Copa Colombia champion, which would qualify for the Copa Sudamericana instead.

== Teams ==
Locations of the 2024 Categoría Primera A teams
Locations of the 2024 Primera A teams in Bogotá
Locations of the 2024 Primera A teams in Medellín

20 teams take part in the season, the top 18 teams in the relegation table of the previous season as well as the 2023 Primera B champions Patriotas and runners-up Fortaleza. Fortaleza were the first team to earn promotion, after defeating Cúcuta Deportivo in the 2023 Primera B's Torneo II final on 17 November 2023 and securing the top spot in the season's aggregate table, thus returning to the top flight after eight years, whilst Patriotas clinched promotion back to the top flight after one season on 28 November 2023 by beating Fortaleza in the Primera B's Grand Final. The promoted teams replaced Unión Magdalena and Atlético Huila, the bottom two teams in the relegation table of the 2023 season, who were relegated to Primera B after two and one year in the top flight, respectively.

On 16 January 2024, Alianza Petrolera announced a relocation starting from this season, moving from Barrancabermeja to Valledupar, Cesar Department. With the move to Valledupar, the club also announced that it was dropping the word Petrolera from their name and changing colors, being rebranded to Alianza F.C. The new club was presented that same day at a press conference in Valledupar.

Prior to the start of the season, and due to disagreements and clashes with the local administration of Rionegro that derived into the eviction from their training venue, Águilas Doradas were granted approval by the General Assembly of DIMAYOR to seek a new venue for their home matches. Although the club stayed in Rionegro to play their home matches during the Apertura tournament, on 23 July 2024 it announced the relocation of its home matches to Sincelejo, Sucre Department, given the lack of support from Rionegro's new local government and the difficulty in obtaining sponsorship by private enterprises based in the zone, as well as an invitation from the local government of Sincelejo to play there.

=== Stadia and locations ===
Team	City	Stadium	Capacity
Águilas Doradas	Rionegro	Alberto Grisales	14,000
Águilas Doradas	Sincelejo	Arturo Cumplido Sierra	10,000
Alianza	Valledupar	Armando Maestre Pavajeau	11,000
América de Cali	Cali	Pascual Guerrero	38,588
Atlético Bucaramanga	Bucaramanga	Américo Montanini (Note: Named Estadio Alfonso López until 11 June 2024.)	28,000
Atlético Nacional	Medellín	Atanasio Girardot	44,863
Boyacá Chicó	Tunja	La Independencia	20,630
Deportes Tolima	Ibagué	Manuel Murillo Toro	28,100
Deportivo Cali	Palmira	Deportivo Cali	42,000
Deportivo Pasto	Pasto	Departamental Libertad	18,000
Deportivo Pereira	Pereira	Hernán Ramírez Villegas	30,297
Envigado	Envigado	Polideportivo Sur	14,000
Fortaleza	Bogotá	Metropolitano de Techo	10,000
Independiente Medellín	Medellín	Atanasio Girardot	44,863
Jaguares	Montería	Jaraguay	12,000
Junior	Barranquilla	Metropolitano Roberto Meléndez	46,692
La Equidad	Bogotá	Metropolitano de Techo	10,000
Millonarios	Bogotá	Nemesio Camacho El Campín	39,512
Once Caldas	Manizales	Palogrande	31,611
Patriotas	Tunja	La Independencia	20,630
Santa Fe	Bogotá	Nemesio Camacho El Campín	39,512

=== Personnel and kits ===
Team	Manager	Kit manufacturer	Main shirt sponsors
Águilas Doradas	(Colombia) Juan Pablo Buch	Aerosport	Alcaldía de Sincelejo
Alianza	(Colombia) Hubert Bodhert	Pin-Go	Gobernación del Cesar, Pool, Fundación Universitaria San Mateo
América de Cali	(Uruguay) Jorge da Silva	Le Coq Sportif	Colanta, Águila, BetPlay
Atlético Bucaramanga	(Venezuela) Rafael Dudamel	Lotto	Rivalo, Súper Bodega Bogotá, Clinisports
Atlético Nacional	(Mexico) Efraín Juárez	Nike	Betsson
Boyacá Chicó	(Colombia) Juan Carlos Álvarez	Geus	
Deportes Tolima	(Colombia) David González	Sheffy	BetPlay, Mercacentro, Pool
Deportivo Cali	(Colombia) Sergio Herrera	Kappa	Wplay, Pastas La Muñeca, Constructora Cosenza
Deportivo Pasto	(Paraguay) Gustavo Florentín	Aerosport (Apertura); Boman (Finalización)	Aguardiente Nariño, Banco AV Villas
Deportivo Pereira	(Colombia) Luis Fernando Suárez	Oto	Rivalo, Ukumarí
Envigado	(Colombia) Andrés Orozco (caretaker)	Kappa	Pool, Colanta
Fortaleza	(Colombia) Sebastián Oliveros	Kimo	BetPlay, Colanta, Pool, Gencell Pharma
Independiente Medellín	(Colombia) Alejandro Restrepo	Adidas	Colanta, Wplay
Jaguares	(Colombia) Édgar Carvajal	Kimo	Colanta, Pool
Junior	(Venezuela) César Farías	Adidas	Olímpica, Águila, Tecnoglass
La Equidad	(Colombia) Alexis García	Attle	Cootrafa, BetPlay
Millonarios	(Colombia) Alberto Gamero	Adidas	Cerveza Andina
Once Caldas	(Colombia) Hernán Darío Herrera	Boman	Colanta, BetPlay, Wakate
Patriotas	(Colombia) Dayron Pérez	Kimo	Aguardiente Líder, SmartFit
Santa Fe	(Uruguay) Pablo Peirano	Fila	Colanta, BetPlay

=== Managerial changes ===
Team	Outgoing manager	Manner of departure	Date of vacancy	Position in table	Incoming manager	Date of appointment
Torneo Apertura
Atlético Bucaramanga	(Argentina) Jorge Ramoa	End of caretaker spell	8 November 2023	Pre-season	(Venezuela) Rafael Dudamel	1 December 2023
Jaguares	(Colombia) Carlos Mario Hoyos	Sacked	10 November 2023	Pre-season	(Colombia) Hubert Bodhert	15 November 2023
Deportivo Pasto	(Colombia) Flabio Torres	Mutual agreement	11 November 2023	Pre-season	(Colombia) Jersson González	16 November 2023
Deportivo Pereira	(Colombia) Alejandro Restrepo	End of contract	11 November 2023	Pre-season	(Colombia) Leonel Álvarez	30 November 2023
Patriotas	(Spain) Jonathan Risueño	Sacked	11 December 2023	Pre-season	(Colombia) Harold Rivera	11 December 2023
Boyacá Chicó	(Colombia) Belmer Aguilar	Sacked	14 December 2023	Pre-season	(Argentina) Miguel Caneo	19 December 2023
Águilas Doradas	(Venezuela) César Farías	Resigned	2 January 2024	Pre-season	(Colombia) Hernán Darío Gómez	15 January 2024
América de Cali	(Colombia) Lucas González	Sacked	15 January 2024	Pre-season	(Colombia) Álex Escobar (Note: Caretaker manager.)	15 January 2024
América de Cali	(Colombia) Álex Escobar	End of caretaker spell	23 January 2024	15th	(Venezuela) César Farías	23 January 2024
Boyacá Chicó	(Argentina) Miguel Caneo	Mutual agreement	10 February 2024	20th	(Colombia) Jhon Jaime Gómez	12 February 2024
Atlético Nacional	(Colombia) Jhon Jairo Bodmer	Resigned	23 February 2024	14th	(Colombia) Juan Camilo Pérez	23 February 2024
Deportivo Pasto	(Colombia) Jersson González	Sacked	25 February 2024	20th	(Colombia) René Rosero	25 February 2024
Atlético Nacional	(Colombia) Juan Camilo Pérez	End of caretaker spell	2 March 2024	16th	(Uruguay) Pablo Repetto	28 February 2024
Deportivo Cali	(Colombia) Jaime de la Pava	Resigned	17 March 2024	10th	(Colombia) Hernando Patiño	18 March 2024
Águilas Doradas	(Colombia) Hernán Darío Gómez	Mutual agreement	28 March 2024	15th	(Colombia) José Luis García (Note: Originally as caretaker manager, appointed on a permanent basis on 15 May 2024.)	28 March 2024
Alianza	(Colombia) César Torres	Mutual agreement	29 March 2024	18th	(Colombia) Hubert Bodhert (Note: Leonardo Torres was the caretaker manager for the 2024 Copa Sudamericana group stage matchday 1 and the Torneo Apertura 15th round match against Patriotas.)	6 April 2024
Envigado	(Colombia) Dayron Pérez	Mutual agreement	1 April 2024	17th	(Colombia) Alexis Márquez	1 April 2024
Jaguares	(Colombia) Hubert Bodhert	Resigned	3 April 2024	14th	(Colombia) Carlos Echeverry	3 April 2024
Deportivo Pasto	(Colombia) René Rosero	End of caretaker spell	8 April 2024	17th	(Paraguay) Gustavo Florentín	8 April 2024
América de Cali	(Venezuela) César Farías	Mutual agreement	30 April 2024	10th	(Uruguay) Jorge da Silva	7 May 2024
Jaguares	(Colombia) Carlos Echeverry	End of caretaker spell	24 May 2024	14th	(Argentina) Néstor Craviotto	24 May 2024
Deportivo Cali	(Colombia) Hernando Patiño	End of caretaker spell	8 June 2024	15th	(Colombia) Hernán Torres	8 June 2024
Deportivo Pereira	(Colombia) Leonel Álvarez	Mutual agreement	13 June 2024	3rd, Group A	(Colombia) Luis Fernando Suárez	18 June 2024
Torneo Finalización
Independiente Medellín	(Uruguay) Alfredo Arias	Sacked	4 August 2024	9th	(Colombia) Alejandro Restrepo	7 August 2024
Jaguares	(Argentina) Néstor Craviotto	Resigned	19 August 2024	20th	(Colombia) Édgar Carvajal	21 August 2024
Atlético Nacional	(Uruguay) Pablo Repetto	Sacked	27 August 2024	3rd	(Mexico) Efraín Juárez (Note: Diego Arias was the caretaker manager for the Torneo Finalización 8th round match against Jaguares.)	28 August 2024
Junior	(Colombia) Arturo Reyes	Sacked	3 September 2024	6th	(Venezuela) César Farías	3 September 2024
Envigado	(Colombia) Alexis Márquez	Mutual agreement	8 September 2024	19th	(Colombia) Andrés Orozco	8 September 2024
Patriotas	(Colombia) Harold Rivera	Resigned	15 September 2024	15th	(Colombia) Dayron Pérez	16 September 2024
Deportivo Cali	(Colombia) Hernán Torres	Mutual agreement	19 September 2024	17th	(Colombia) Sergio Herrera	19 September 2024
Boyacá Chicó	(Colombia) Jhon Jaime Gómez	End of caretaker spell	7 October 2024	19th	(Uruguay) Sergio Migliaccio	7 October 2024
Águilas Doradas	(Colombia) José Luis García	Sacked	7 October 2024	9th	(Colombia) Juan Pablo Buch	8 October 2024
Boyacá Chicó	(Uruguay) Sergio Migliaccio	Sacked	26 October 2024	20th	(Colombia) Juan Carlos Álvarez	27 October 2024

== Torneo Apertura ==
The Torneo Apertura (officially known as Liga BetPlay Dimayor 2024–I) was the first tournament of the 2024 season. It began on 19 January and ended on 15 June 2024.

=== First stage ===
==== Standings ====
Pos	Team	Pld	W	D	L	GF	GA	GD	Pts	Qualification
1	Atlético Bucaramanga	19	11	5	3	24	10	+14	38	Advance to the semi-finals
2	Deportes Tolima	19	11	5	3	31	18	+13	38	Advance to the semi-finals
3	Deportivo Pereira	19	10	4	5	28	18	+10	34	Advance to the semi-finals
4	Santa Fe	19	10	4	5	22	12	+10	34	Advance to the semi-finals
5	La Equidad	19	9	6	4	22	14	+8	33	Advance to the semi-finals
6	Millonarios	19	9	4	6	28	20	+8	31	Advance to the semi-finals
7	Junior	19	8	5	6	24	21	+3	29	Advance to the semi-finals
8	Once Caldas	19	8	5	6	16	16	0	29	Advance to the semi-finals
9	Independiente Medellín	19	8	5	6	22	31	−9	29	
10	América de Cali	19	6	7	6	22	16	+6	25	
11	Águilas Doradas	19	7	4	8	20	19	+1	25	
12	Atlético Nacional	19	6	6	7	21	20	+1	24	
13	Fortaleza	19	6	6	7	18	20	−2	24	
14	Jaguares	19	5	7	7	17	20	−3	22	
15	Deportivo Cali	19	5	6	8	24	24	0	21	
16	Deportivo Pasto	19	5	4	10	15	21	−6	19	
17	Boyacá Chicó	19	5	3	11	22	35	−13	18	
18	Envigado	19	3	7	9	15	25	−10	16	
19	Alianza	19	4	4	11	15	29	−14	16	
20	Patriotas	19	4	3	12	8	25	−17	15	

Source: Dimayor, Soccerway
Rules for classification: 1) Points, 2) Goal difference, 3) Goals for, 4) Away goals for, 5) Away goals against, 6) Drawing of lots.

==== Results ====
Home \ Away	AGU	ALI	AME	BUC	NAC	BOY	TOL	CAL	PAS	PER	ENV	FOR	DIM	JAG	JUN	EQU	MIL	ONC	PAT	SFE
Águilas Doradas	—	4–0	—	—	0–3	—	—	—	0–1	—	2–0	1–1	—	—	0–2	1–1	—	1–0	—	1–1
Alianza	—	—	—	—	—	—	0–2	3–3	1–1	1–2	—	—	2–0	2–1	0–1	0–3	—	—	—	0–1
América de Cali	0–1	2–0	—	0–0	4–1	3–2	—	—	0–0	—	—	—	—	—	4–1	0–1	—	—	1–0	—
Atlético Bucaramanga	1–0	1–0	—	—	—	2–3	—	2–1	1–0	—	3–1	—	—	—	—	4–0	0–0	1–1	3–0	—
Atlético Nacional	—	3–1	—	0–0	—	—	3–1	—	1–0	0–1	—	1–2	—	2–0	—	—	0–1	1–1	—	—
Boyacá Chicó	1–2	1–0	—	—	2–1	—	1–1	—	—	1–2	—	—	3–0	1–0	2–2	—	—	—	1–2	1–2
Deportes Tolima	2–1	—	2–1	0–0	—	—	—	—	—	2–1	—	1–2	2–2	2–0	—	—	2–0	—	2–1	—
Deportivo Cali	2–4	—	1–1	—	3–2	4–0	1–2	—	—	—	2–0	2–0	—	—	0–0	—	—	0–1	0–1	—
Deportivo Pasto	—	—	—	—	—	2–1	1–4	0–1	—	—	0–1	1–0	—	1–1	—	2–3	2–3	0–0	—	0–1
Deportivo Pereira	2–1	—	2–0	1–2	—	—	—	2–2	0–1	—	—	2–0	—	0–0	3–3	—	1–2	—	—	1–0
Envigado	—	1–2	1–1	—	0–1	2–0	0–2	—	—	1–1	—	—	0–1	2–2	—	—	1–1	—	1–0	—
Fortaleza	—	1–2	0–0	0–2	—	1–1	—	—	—	—	1–1	—	—	—	2–0	—	1–2	2–0	2–0	—
Independiente Medellín	1–0	—	1–4	1–0	2–2	—	—	1–0	1–0	1–0	—	2–2	—	—	—	—	—	1–2	—	1–1
Jaguares	1–0	—	1–1	0–1	—	—	—	1–1	—	—	—	0–1	2–2	—	—	0–0	2–1	3–0	—	1–0
Junior	—	—	—	2–0	0–0	—	0–1	—	2–0	—	1–1	—	3–0	3–1	—	1–0	—	1–0	—	—
La Equidad	—	—	—	—	2–0	4–0	1–1	2–0	—	0–2	0–0	0–0	1–2	—	—	—	—	—	1–0	1–0
Millonarios	0–1	1–1	1–0	—	—	3–0	—	1–1	—	—	—	—	5–0	—	3–2	1–2	—	0–2	—	3–1
Once Caldas	—	1–0	0–0	—	—	2–1	2–1	—	—	1–2	2–1	—	—	—	—	0–0	—	—	1–0	0–1
Patriotas	0–0	0–0	—	—	0–0	—	—	—	0–3	0–3 (Note: Match abandoned after 64 minutes of play and awarded 0–3 to Deportivo Pereira due to pitch invasion by Patriotas fans. The score at the time of suspension was 0–2.)	—	—	2–3	0–1	1–0	—	1–0	—	—	—
Santa Fe	—	—	1–0	0–1	0–0	—	1–1	1–0	—	—	3–1	2–0	—	—	3–0	—	—	—	3–0	—

Source: Dimayor, Soccerway
Legend: Blue = home team win; Yellow = draw; Red = away team win.

=== Semi-finals ===
The eight teams that advanced to the semi-finals were drawn into two groups of four teams, with the top two teams from the first stage being seeded in each group. The two group winners advanced to the finals.

==== Group A ====
Pos	Team	Pld	W	D	L	GF	GA	GD	Pts	Qualification	BUC	MIL	PER	JUN
1	Atlético Bucaramanga	6	2	2	2	4	3	+1	8 (Note: Atlético Bucaramanga ahead of Millonarios, Deportivo Pereira, and Junior for being the group's seeded team.)	Advance to the Finals	—	0–0	3–1	0–0
2	Millonarios	6	2	2	2	6	5	+1	8		0–1	—	1–0	2–0
3	Deportivo Pereira	6	2	2	2	7	8	−1	8		1–0	2–2	—	0–0
4	Junior	6	2	2	2	5	6	−1	8		1–0	2–1	2–3	—

Source: Dimayor, Soccerway
Legend: Blue = home team win; Yellow = draw; Red = away team win.
Rules for classification: 1) Points, 2) First stage position (only applies for the seeded team, if it is involved in a tie), 3) Goal difference, 4) Goals for, 5) Away goals for, 6) Away goals against, 7) First stage position.

==== Group B ====
Pos	Team	Pld	W	D	L	GF	GA	GD	Pts	Qualification	SFE	TOL	ONC	EQU
1	Santa Fe	6	5	1	0	8	1	+7	16	Advance to the Finals	—	1–0	1–0	2–0
2	Deportes Tolima	6	3	1	2	9	6	+3	10		1–2	—	1–1	3–0
3	Once Caldas	6	2	2	2	5	4	+1	8		0–0	0–1	—	2–0
4	La Equidad	6	0	0	6	3	14	−11	0		0–2	2–3	1–2	—

Source: Dimayor, Soccerway
Legend: Blue = home team win; Yellow = draw; Red = away team win.
Rules for classification: 1) Points, 2) First stage position (only applies for the seeded team, if it is involved in a tie), 3) Goal difference, 4) Goals for, 5) Away goals for, 6) Away goals against, 7) First stage position.

=== Finals ===
8 June 2024
19:30 UTC−5

Atlético Bucaramanga	1–0	Santa Fe
Hinestroza 69'	Report

Estadio Alfonso López, Bucaramanga
Attendance: 28,000
Referee: Wilmar Roldán

15 June 2024
19:30 UTC−5

Santa Fe	3–2	Atlético Bucaramanga
Rodallega 10'; Millán 84'; Rodríguez 90' (pen.)	Report	Córdoba 30'; Dan. Mosquera 48'
Penalties
Chaverra (penalty scored); Rodríguez (penalty missed); Ortiz (penalty scored); Perlaza (penalty scored); Rodallega (penalty scored); Zuluaga (penalty scored); Millán (penalty missed)	5–6	(penalty scored) Dan. Mosquera; (penalty scored) Henao; (penalty scored) Micolta; (penalty missed) Flores; (penalty scored) Mena; (penalty scored) Zárate; (penalty scored) Castro

Estadio El Campín, Bogotá
Attendance: 34,239
Referee: Carlos Betancur

Tied 3–3 on aggregate, Atlético Bucaramanga won on penalties.

=== Top scorers ===
Rank	Player	Club	Goals
1	(Colombia) Carlos Bacca	Junior	12
1	(Colombia) Hugo Rodallega	Santa Fe	12
3	(Colombia) Dayro Moreno	Once Caldas	11
4	(Colombia) Leonardo Castro	Millonarios	10
4	(Colombia) Yeison Guzmán	Deportes Tolima	10
4	(Colombia) Darwin Quintero	Deportivo Pereira	10
7	(Colombia) Kevin Viveros	La Equidad	8
8	(Colombia) Daniel Mosquera	Atlético Bucaramanga	7
9	(Colombia) Juan José Córdoba	Deportivo Cali	6
9	(Colombia) Faber Gil	Deportivo Pereira	6
9	(Argentina) Rodrigo Holgado	América de Cali	6
9	(Colombia) Wilson Morelo	Jaguares	6
9	(Venezuela) Henry Plazas	Boyacá Chicó	6
9	(Colombia) Élan Ricardo	La Equidad	6

Source: Soccerway

== Torneo Finalización ==
The Torneo Finalización (officially known as Liga BetPlay Dimayor 2024–II) was the second and last tournament of the 2024 season. It began on 15 July and ended on 22 December 2024.

=== First stage ===
==== Standings ====
Pos	Team	Pld	W	D	L	GF	GA	GD	Pts	Qualification
1	Santa Fe	19	10	7	2	26	12	+14	37	Advance to the semi-finals
2	América de Cali	19	11	4	4	27	16	+11	37	Advance to the semi-finals
3	Millonarios	19	10	5	4	27	13	+14	35	Advance to the semi-finals
4	Deportes Tolima	19	10	4	5	25	12	+13	34	Advance to the semi-finals
5	Atlético Nacional	19	9	5	5	27	20	+7	32	Advance to the semi-finals
6	Junior	19	8	7	4	26	16	+10	31	Advance to the semi-finals
7	Once Caldas	19	9	4	6	21	19	+2	31	Advance to the semi-finals
8	Deportivo Pasto	19	9	3	7	25	18	+7	30	Advance to the semi-finals
9	Independiente Medellín	19	7	8	4	23	15	+8	29	
10	Atlético Bucaramanga	19	8	4	7	21	17	+4	28	
11	Fortaleza	19	7	6	6	23	20	+3	27	
12	Deportivo Pereira	19	7	6	6	19	18	+1	27	
13	La Equidad	19	5	7	7	20	26	−6	22	
14	Águilas Doradas	19	5	6	8	18	27	−9	21	
15	Patriotas	19	5	5	9	23	29	−6	20	
16	Alianza	19	4	5	10	17	25	−8	17	
17	Deportivo Cali	19	4	5	10	15	28	−13	17	
18	Jaguares	19	3	6	10	9	24	−15	15	
19	Boyacá Chicó	19	4	3	12	13	34	−21	15	
20	Envigado	19	3	4	12	9	25	−16	13	

Source: Dimayor, Soccerway
Rules for classification: 1) Points, 2) Goal difference, 3) Goals for, 4) Away goals for, 5) Away goals against, 6) Drawing of lots.

==== Results ====
Home \ Away	AGU	ALI	AME	BUC	NAC	BOY	TOL	CAL	PAS	PER	ENV	FOR	DIM	JAG	JUN	EQU	MIL	ONC	PAT	SFE
Águilas Doradas	—	—	1–2	1–3	—	0–1	0–1	1–1	—	1–1	—	—	1–1	1–0	—	—	2–1	—	3–2	—
Alianza	3–0	—	0–1	0–4	0–2	4–0	—	—	—	—	1–1	1–1	—	—	—	—	2–1	1–0	1–1	—
América de Cali	—	—	—	—	—	—	1–0	0–1	—	1–0	4–0	1–1	1–0	1–0	—	—	2–1	3–0	—	0–0
Atlético Bucaramanga	—	—	1–2	—	1–0	—	0–2	—	—	1–1	—	1–0	2–3	0–0	1–0	—	—	—	—	0–1
Atlético Nacional	1–1	—	2–1	—	—	6–2	—	1–1	—	—	2–1	—	1–1	—	0–3 (Note: Match abandoned after 56 minutes of play and awarded 0–3 to Junior due to crowd disturbances. The score at the time of suspension was 2–0.)	0–1	—	—	3–1	1–1
Boyacá Chicó	—	—	0–2	1–1	—	—	—	1–0	1–0	—	0–0	2–2	—	—	—	1–0	1–5	0–1	—	—
Deportes Tolima	—	2–0	—	—	1–0	2–1	—	1–1	2–1	—	3–0	—	—	—	0–1	5–1	—	1–1	—	0–0
Deportivo Cali	—	1–0	—	1–0	—	—	—	—	0–3 (Note: Match awarded 0–3 to Deportivo Pasto due to pitch invasion by Deportivo Cali fans. The match was ended with Deportivo Pasto winning 0–2.)	0–2	—	—	2–0	1–2	—	1–1	0–1	—	—	1–3
Deportivo Pasto	3–1	1–0	3–1	1–2	1–2	—	—	—	—	2–0	—	—	1–0	—	1–0	—	—	—	3–2	—
Deportivo Pereira	—	1–0	—	—	1–1	1–0	1–0	—	—	—	2–0	—	1–1	—	—	4–3	—	0–1	0–1	—
Envigado	3–0	—	—	0–0	—	—	—	1–0	0–1	—	—	0–1	—	—	0–0	2–1	—	0–1	—	0–1
Fortaleza	0–1	—	—	—	0–1	—	1–1	2–1	0–0	1–0	—	—	2–2	3–1	—	2–1	—	—	—	1–3
Independiente Medellín	—	2–0	—	—	—	1–0	0–1	—	—	—	1–0	—	—	4–1	0–0	0–0	1–1	—	3–0	—
Jaguares	—	0–0	—	—	0–2	1–0	0–2	—	0–0	1–2	2–1	—	—	—	1–1	—	—	—	0–0	—
Junior	3–4	2–2	3–1	—	—	2–1	—	3–0	—	3–1	—	2–1	—	—	—	—	0–0	—	2–1	1–1
La Equidad	0–0	3–2	2–2	0–1	—	—	—	—	2–2	—	—	—	—	1–0	1–0	—	1–3	1–1	—	—
Millonarios	—	—	—	1–0	1–2	—	1–0	—	1–0	0–0	3–0	2–1	—	0–0	—	—	—	—	3–0	—
Once Caldas	1–0	—	—	2–1	2–0	—	—	4–1	2–1	—	—	0–2	0–2	2–0	0–0	—	1–1	—	—	—
Patriotas	—	—	1–1	1–2	—	3–0	2–1	2–2	—	—	2–0	0–2	—	—	—	0–0	—	3–1	—	1–2
Santa Fe	0–0	2–0	—	—	—	3–1	—	—	2–1	1–1	—	—	1–1	3–0	—	0–1	0–1	2–1	—	—

Source: Dimayor, Soccerway
Legend: Blue = home team win; Yellow = draw; Red = away team win.

=== Semi-finals ===
The eight teams that advanced to the semi-finals were drawn into two groups of four teams, with the top two teams from the first stage being seeded in each group. The two group winners advanced to the finals.

==== Group A ====
Pos	Team	Pld	W	D	L	GF	GA	GD	Pts	Qualification	NAC	MIL	PAS	SFE
1	Atlético Nacional	6	4	1	1	13	4	+9	13	Advance to the Finals	—	1–1	2–1	5–0
2	Millonarios	6	3	3	0	7	4	+3	12		2–1	—	2–1	1–1
3	Deportivo Pasto	6	2	1	3	5	6	−1	7		0–1	0–0	—	1–0
4	Santa Fe	6	0	1	5	2	13	−11	1		0–3	0–1	1–2	—

Source: Dimayor, Soccerway
Legend: Blue = home team win; Yellow = draw; Red = away team win.
Rules for classification: 1) Points, 2) First stage position (only applies for the seeded team, if it is involved in a tie), 3) Goal difference, 4) Goals for, 5) Away goals for, 6) Away goals against, 7) First stage position.

==== Group B ====
Pos	Team	Pld	W	D	L	GF	GA	GD	Pts	Qualification	TOL	ONC	AME	JUN
1	Deportes Tolima	6	3	1	2	7	7	0	10	Advance to the Finals	—	1–0	1–0	1–0
2	Once Caldas	6	2	3	1	8	5	+3	9		0–0	—	3–0	2–2
3	América de Cali	6	2	1	3	6	8	−2	7 (Note: América de Cali ahead of Junior for being the group's seeded team.)		4–2	1–1	—	1–0
4	Junior	6	2	1	3	7	8	−1	7		3–2	1–2	1–0	—

Source: Dimayor, Soccerway
Legend: Blue = home team win; Yellow = draw; Red = away team win.
Rules for classification: 1) Points, 2) First stage position (only applies for the seeded team, if it is involved in a tie), 3) Goal difference, 4) Goals for, 5) Away goals for, 6) Away goals against, 7) First stage position.

=== Finals ===
18 December 2024
19:30 UTC−5

Deportes Tolima	1–1	Atlético Nacional
Ramírez 75'	Report	Asprilla 35'

Estadio Manuel Murillo Toro, Ibagué
Referee: Carlos Betancur

22 December 2024
18:00 UTC−5

Atlético Nacional	2–0	Deportes Tolima
Morelos 6'; Román 31'	Report

Estadio Atanasio Girardot, Medellín
Referee: Carlos Ortega

Atlético Nacional won 3–1 on aggregate.

=== Top scorers ===
Rank	Player	Club	Goals
1	(Colombia) Daniel Moreno	Deportivo Pasto	17
2	(Colombia) Dayro Moreno	Once Caldas	10
3	(Colombia) Carlos Bacca	Junior	8
3	(Colombia) Leonardo Castro	Millonarios	8
3	(El Salvador) Brayan Gil	Deportes Tolima	8
3	(Colombia) Yeison Guzmán	Deportes Tolima	8
3	(Colombia) Duván Vergara	América de Cali	8
8	(Colombia) Alfredo Morelos	Atlético Nacional	7
8	(Colombia) Andrés Román	Atlético Nacional	7
10	(Colombia) Michael Barrios	Once Caldas	6
10	(Colombia) Santiago Mosquera	Santa Fe	6
10	(Colombia) Jeison Quiñónes	Águilas Doradas	6
10	(Colombia) Adrián Ramos	América de Cali	6
10	(Colombia) Hugo Rodallega	Santa Fe	6
10	(Colombia) Stiven Rodríguez	Junior	6

Source: Soccerway

== Aggregate table ==
Pos	Team	Pld	W	D	L	GF	GA	GD	Pts	Qualification
1	Deportes Tolima	52	27	12	13	73	46	+27	93	Qualification for Copa Libertadores second stage
2	Santa Fe	52	26	13	13	61	41	+20	91	Qualification for Copa Libertadores second stage
3	Millonarios	50	24	14	12	68	42	+26	86	Qualification for Copa Sudamericana first stage (Note: Since the winners of the 2024 Copa Colombia, Atlético Nacional, qualified for the Copa Libertadores, the Copa Sudamericana spot given to the Copa Colombia winners was passed to the aggregate table's best-placed team that failed to qualify for the Copa Libertadores.)
4	Atlético Bucaramanga (C)	46	22	11	13	52	33	+19	77	Qualification for Copa Libertadores group stage
5	Once Caldas	50	21	14	15	50	44	+6	77	Qualification for Copa Sudamericana first stage
6	Junior	50	20	15	15	62	51	+11	75	Qualification for Copa Sudamericana first stage
7	Atlético Nacional (C)	46	20	13	13	64	45	+19	73	Qualification for Copa Libertadores group stage
8	América de Cali	44	19	12	13	55	40	+15	69	Qualification for Copa Sudamericana first stage
9	Deportivo Pereira	44	19	12	13	54	44	+10	69	
10	Independiente Medellín	38	15	13	10	45	46	−1	58	
11	Deportivo Pasto	44	16	8	20	45	45	0	56	
12	La Equidad	44	14	13	17	45	54	−9	55	
13	Fortaleza	38	13	12	13	41	40	+1	51	
14	Águilas Doradas	38	12	10	16	38	46	−8	46	
15	Deportivo Cali	38	9	11	18	39	52	−13	38	
16	Jaguares	38	8	13	17	26	44	−18	37	
17	Patriotas	38	9	8	21	31	54	−23	35	
18	Alianza	38	8	9	21	32	54	−22	33	
19	Boyacá Chicó	38	9	6	23	35	69	−34	33	
20	Envigado	38	6	11	21	24	50	−26	29	

Source: Dimayor
Rules for classification: 1) Points, 2) Goal difference, 3) Goals for, 4) Away goals for, 5) Away goals against, 6) Drawing of lots.
(C) Champions

== Relegation ==
A separate table is kept to determine the teams that are relegated to the Categoría Primera B for the next season. This table is elaborated from a sum of all first stage games played in the three most recent seasons (including the 2022–I, 2022–II, 2023–I, 2023–II, 2024–I, and 2024–II tournaments), with the points earned being averaged per match played. The bottom two teams of the relegation table at the end of the season were relegated to Categoría Primera B.

Pos	Team	2022 Pts	2023 Pts	2024 Pts	2024 GF	2024 GA	2024 GD	Total Pld	Total Pts	Avg.	Relegation
1	Millonarios	74	68	66	55	33	+22	118	208	1.76	
2	Deportes Tolima	66	61	72	56	30	+26	118	199	1.69	
3	Independiente Medellín	67	68	58	45	46	−1	118	193	1.64	
4	Atlético Nacional	66	68	56	48	40	+8	118	190	1.61	
5	Águilas Doradas	58	83	46	38	46	−8	118	187	1.58	
6	América de Cali	54	69	62	49	32	+17	118	185	1.57	
7	Santa Fe	61	50	71	48	24	+24	118	182	1.54	
8	Junior	63	58	60	50	37	+13	118	181	1.53	
9	Atlético Bucaramanga	59	46	66	45	27	+18	118	171	1.45	
10	La Equidad	58	52	55	42	40	+2	118	165	1.4	
11	Deportivo Pereira	55	44	61	47	36	+11	118	160	1.36	
12	Once Caldas	56	42	60	37	35	+2	118	158	1.34	
13	Fortaleza	—	—	51	41	40	+1	38	51	1.34	
14	Deportivo Pasto	54	54	49	40	39	+1	118	157	1.33	
15	Alianza	46	58	33	32	54	−22	118	137	1.16	
16	Boyacá Chicó	—	49	33	35	69	−34	78	82	1.05	
17	Deportivo Cali	34	51	38	39	52	–13	118	123	1.04	
18	Envigado	57	33	29	24	50	–26	118	119	1.01	
19	Jaguares (R)	47	33	37	26	44	–18	118	117	0.99	Relegation to Categoría Primera B
20	Patriotas (R)	—	—	35	31	54	−23	38	35	0.92	Relegation to Categoría Primera B

Source: Dimayor
Rules for classification: 1) average, 2) 2024 points, 3) 2024 goal difference, 4) 2024 goals scored, 5) 2024 away goals scored, 6) 2024 away goals against, 7) 2024 wins, 8) 2024 yellow cards, 9) 2024 red cards, 10) drawing of lots.

== Attendances ==
=== 2024–I ===
The average league attendance was 11,536 in the 2024–I season:

#	Club	Total attendance	Average attendance
1	Millonarios	226,325	22,633
2	Deportivo Pereira	207,297	20,730
3	Santa Fe	182,672	20,297
4	Independiente Medellín	194,854	19,485
5	Once Caldas	157,000	17,444
6	Deportivo Cali	166,293	16,629
7	América de Cali	141,774	15,753
8	Junior	139,909	15,545
9	Atlético Bucaramanga	135,000	13,500
10	Atlético Nacional	99,683	11,076
11	Deportes Tolima	95,600	10,622
12	Deportivo Pasto	76,000	7,600
13	Alianza	61,500	6,833
14	Jaguares	60,000	6,000
15	La Equidad	55,600	5,560
16	Fortaleza	46,857	5,206
17	Envigado	45,425	4,543
18	Águilas Doradas	35,500	3,944
19	Patriotas	31,100	3,888
20	Boyacá Chicó	34,400	3,440

Source: World Football

=== 2024-II ===
The average league attendance was 10,691 in the 2024–II season:

#	Club	Total attendance	Average attendance
1	Millonarios	260,615	28,957
2	Independiente Medellín	167,379	18,598
3	Deportivo Cali	148,662	16,518
4	América de Cali	161,784	16,178
5	Atlético Nacional	160,321	16,032
6	Once Caldas	158,983	15,898
7	Deportivo Pereira	129,500	14,389
8	Junior	137,707	13,771
9	Santa Fe	137,313	13,731
10	Atlético Bucaramanga	122,549	13,617
11	Águilas Doradas	119,000	11,900
12	Deportivo Pasto	99,000	11,000
13	Deportes Tolima	89,978	8,998
14	Jaguares	55,000	6,111
15	Alianza	59,500	5,950
16	Fortaleza	46,600	4,660
17	La Equidad	36,100	4,011
18	Envigado	26,500	2,944
19	Patriotas	28,200	2,820
20	Boyacá Chicó	13,900	1,544

Source: World Football

== See also ==
- 2024 Categoría Primera B season
- 2024 Copa Colombia
