= 2022 Malaysia Cup =

Piala Malaysia 2022

Tournament details
- Country: Malaysia
- Dates: 26 October – 26 November 2022
- Teams: 16

Final positions
- Champions: Johor Darul Ta'zim (3rd title)
- Runners-up: Selangor

Tournament statistics
- Matches played: 29
- Goals scored: 78 (2.69 per match)
- Top goal scorer(s): Bergson; Kpah Sherman (7 goals each)

The 2022 Malaysia Cup (Malay: Piala Malaysia 2022), officially known as the TM Piala Malaysia 2022 for sponsorship reasons, was the 96th edition of Malaysia Cup tournament organised by the Football Association of Malaysia (FAM) and the Malaysian Football League (MFL).

Kuala Lumpur City were the defending champions after defeating Johor Darul Ta'zim 2–0 in the previous final, but were eliminated by Terengganu in the quarter-finals.

Johor Darul Ta'zim won the final with score 2–1 over Selangor to clinch their third Malaysia Cup title.

== Format ==
In the competition, the top eleven teams from the 2022 Malaysia Super League were joined by the top five teams from the 2022 Malaysia Premier League. In this edition, the group stage was not played. The competition was played from 25 October to 26 November 2022, with 16 teams in the knockout stage which began in the round of 16, followed by quarter-finals, semi-finals and the final. This stage was played in two legs, except for the final which was played as a single leg. On 19 October 2022, the Malaysian Football League (MFL) announced that the away goals rule had been abolished.

== Schedule and draw dates ==
The draw for the 2022 Malaysia Cup was held on 25 October 2022.

Phase	Round	First leg	Second leg
Knockout phase	Round 16	26 & 27 October 2022	31 October & 1 November 2022
Knockout phase	Quarter-finals	5 & 6 November 2022	11 & 12 November 2022
Knockout phase	Semi-finals	15 & 16 November 2022	20 & 21 November 2022
Knockout phase	Final	26 November 2022	

== Seeding ==
Teams were divided to their pots according to their placements in the 2022 Malaysia Super League and 2022 Malaysia Premier League. Pot A included the top 4 teams from the Super League, pot B included teams placed 5th and 6th in the Super League and the top 2 teams from the Premier League, and pot C included teams placed 7th to 11th in the Super League together with those placed 3rd to 5th in the Premier League.

Pot A (R16 Away Team 4, 8, 12, 16)	Pot B (R16 Away Team 2, 6, 10, 14)	Pot C (R16 Home Team 1, 3, 5, 7, 9, 11, 13, 15)
Johor Darul Ta'zim; Terengganu; Sabah; Negeri Sembilan	Selangor; Kuala Lumpur City; Kelantan; Kuching City	Sri Pahang; Kedah Darul Aman; Petaling Jaya City; Sarawak United; Penang; Kelantan United; PDRM; UiTM

== Knockout stage ==
In the knockout phase, teams played against each other over two legs on a home-and-away basis, except for the final which was played as a single-leg game.

=== Bracket ===
The bracket was decided after the draw for the round of 16, which was held on 6 October 2022 at the MFL House in Kuala Lumpur.

Round of 16
Penang	2	1	3
Kuching City (a.e.t.)	2	2	4
UiTM	1	1	2
Sabah	2	1	3
Sarawak United	0	1	1
Kelantan	1	1	2
Petaling Jaya City	0	0	0
Johor Darul Ta'zim	4	2	6
Kelantan United	0	0	0
Selangor	2	1	3
Kedah Darul Aman	1	0	1
Negeri Sembilan	2	0	2
PDRM	0	0	0
Kuala Lumpur City	3	1	4
Sri Pahang	1	2	3
Terengganu	5	4	9

Quarter-finals
Kuching City	0	1	1
Sabah (a.e.t.)	1	1	2
Kelantan	0	0	0
Johor Darul Ta'zim	3	5	8
Selangor	2	2	4
Negeri Sembilan	0	2	2
Kuala Lumpur City	0	1	1
Terengganu	1	3	4

Semi-finals
Sabah	0	1	1
Johor Darul Ta'zim	1	3	4
Selangor	3	0	3
Terengganu	1	1	2

Final
Johor Darul Ta'zim	2
Selangor	1

=== Round of 16 ===
The first legs were played on 26 and 27 October, and the second legs on 31 October and 1 November 2022.

Team 1	Agg.	Team 2	1st leg	2nd leg
UiTM	2–3	Sabah	1–2	1–1
Sarawak United	1–2	Kelantan	0–1	1–1
Kelantan United	0–3	Selangor	0–2	0–1
Penang	3–4	Kuching City	2–2	1–2 (a.e.t.)
Petaling Jaya City	0–6	Johor Darul Ta'zim	0–4	0–2
Kedah Darul Aman	1–2	Negeri Sembilan	1–2	0–0
PDRM	0–4	Kuala Lumpur City	0–3	0–1
Sri Pahang	3–9	Terengganu	1–5	2–4

=== Quarter-finals ===
The first legs were played on 5 and 6 November, and the second legs on 11 and 12 November 2022.

Team 1	Agg.	Team 2	1st leg	2nd leg
Kuching City	1–2	Sabah	0–1	1–1 (a.e.t.)
Kelantan	0–8	Johor Darul Ta'zim	0–3	0–5
Selangor	4–2	Negeri Sembilan	2–0	2–2
Kuala Lumpur City	1–4	Terengganu	0–1	1–3

=== Semi-finals ===
The first legs were played on 15 and 16 November, and the second legs on 20 and 21 November 2022.

Team 1	Agg.	Team 2	1st leg	2nd leg
Sabah	1–4	Johor Darul Ta'zim	0–1	1–3
Selangor	3–2	Terengganu	3–1	0–1

=== Final ===
The final was played on 26 November 2022 at the Bukit Jalil National Stadium in Kuala Lumpur.

26 November 2022
21:00 UTC+8

Johor Darul Ta'zim	2–1	Selangor
Bergson 45+2'; Forestieri 59'	Report	Caion 45' (pen.)

Bukit Jalil National Stadium, Kuala Lumpur
Attendance: 79,988
Referee: Nazmi Nasaruddin

== Statistics ==
=== Top goalscorers ===
Rank	Player	Club	Goals
1	(Brazil) Bergson	Johor Darul Ta'zim	7
1	(Liberia) Kpah Sherman	Terengganu	7
3	(Brazil) Caion	Selangor	6
4	(Italy) Fernando Forestieri	Johor Darul Ta'zim	4
5	(Brazil) Lucas Silva	Penang	3
5	(Ivory Coast) Kipré Tchétché	Terengganu	3
7	(Malaysia) Syafiq Ahmad	Johor Darul Ta'zim	2
7	(Colombia) Romel Morales	Kuala Lumpur City	2
7	(Malaysia) Alif Hassan	Kuching City	2
7	(Brazil) Matheus Alves	Negeri Sembilan	2
7	(Japan) Taiki Kagayama	Sabah	2
7	(Malaysia) Baddrol Bakhtiar	Sabah	2
7	(Colombia) Steven Rodriguez	Sri Pahang	2
7	(Malaysia) Faisal Halim	Terengganu	2

== See also ==
- 2022 Piala Sumbangsih
- 2022 Malaysia Super League
- 2022 Malaysia Premier League
- 2022 Malaysia M3 League
- 2022 Malaysia M5 League
