= 2022 Malaysia Cup knockout stage =

Knockout stage of 2022 Malaysia Cup

The 2022 Malaysia Cup knockout stage began on 26 October and ended on 26 November 2022 with the final at the Bukit Jalil National Stadium in Kuala Lumpur, Malaysia, to decide the champions of the 2022 Malaysia Cup. A total of 16 teams competed in the knockout stage, beginning with the Round 16 followed by the quarter-finals, semi-finals and the finals. This stage will be played in two legs except for the finals which is played once.

== Schedule ==
The draw for the 2022 Malaysia Cup was held on 6 October 2022.

Phase	Round	First leg	Second leg
Knockout phase	Round 16	26 & 27 October 2022	31 October & 1 November 2022
Knockout phase	Quarter-finals	5 & 6 November 2022	11 & 12 November 2021
Knockout phase	Semi-finals	15 & 16 November 2022	20 & 21 November 2022
Knockout phase	Final	26 November 2022	

== Format ==
Each tie in the knockout phase, apart from the final, was played over two legs, with each team playing one leg at home. The team that scored more goals on aggregate over the two legs advanced to the next round. If the aggregate score was level, then 30 minutes of extra time was played (the away goals rule was not applied). If the score was still level at the end of extra time, the winners were decided by a penalty shoot-out. In the final, which was played as a single match, if the score was level at the end of normal time, extra time was played, followed by a penalty shoot-out if the score was still level.

== Bracket ==
The bracket was decided after the draw for the round of 16, which was held on 6 October 2022 at the MFL House in Kuala Lumpur.

Round of 16
Penang	2	1	3
Kuching City (a.e.t.)	2	2	4
UiTM	1	1	2
Sabah	2	1	3
Sarawak United	0	1	1
Kelantan	1	1	2
Petaling Jaya City	0	0	0
Johor Darul Ta'zim	4	2	6
Kelantan United	0	0	0
Selangor	2	1	3
Kedah Darul Aman	1	0	1
Negeri Sembilan	2	0	2
PDRM	0	0	0
Kuala Lumpur City	3	1	4
Sri Pahang	1	2	3
Terengganu	5	4	9

Quarter-finals
Kuching City	0	1	1
Sabah (a.e.t.)	1	1	2
Kelantan	0	0	0
Johor Darul Ta'zim	3	5	8
Selangor	2	2	4
Negeri Sembilan	0	2	2
Kuala Lumpur City	0	1	1
Terengganu	1	3	4

Semi-finals
Sabah	0	1	1
Johor Darul Ta'zim	1	3	4
Selangor	3	0	3
Terengganu	1	1	2

Final
Johor Darul Ta'zim	2
Selangor	1

== Round of 16 ==
The first legs were played on 26 and 27 October, and the second legs were played on 31 October and 1 November 2022.

Team 1	Agg.	Team 2	1st leg	2nd leg
UiTM	2–3	Sabah	1–2	1–1
Sarawak United	1–2	Kelantan	0–1	1–1
Kelantan United	0–3	Selangor	0–2	0–1
Penang	3–4	Kuching City	2–2	1–2 (a.e.t.)
Petaling Jaya City	0–6	Johor Darul Ta'zim	0–4	0–2
Kedah Darul Aman	1–2	Negeri Sembilan	1–2	0–0
PDRM	0–4	Kuala Lumpur City	0–3	0–1
Sri Pahang	3–9	Terengganu	1–5	2–4

=== Matches ===
26 October 2022
20:15

UiTM	1–2	Sabah
Attram 90+1'	Report	Baddrol 44'; Musa 70'

UiTM Stadium, Shah Alam
Attendance: 1,429
Referee: Khairulsyahmi Ahmad Khalidi
31 October 2022
20:15

Sabah	1–1	UiTM
Farhan 66'	Report	Farez 90+2'

Likas Stadium, Kota Kinabalu
Attendance: 5,025
Referee: Abang Azharudin Abdullah

Sabah won 3–2 on aggregate.

26 October 2022
20:15

Sarawak United	0–1	Kelantan
	Report	Hara 82'

Sarawak State Stadium, Kuching
Attendance: 570
Referee: Suhaizi Shukri
31 October 2022
21:00

Kelantan	1–1	Sarawak United
Nurshamil 13'	Report	Raja Imran 31'

Sultan Muhammad IV Stadium, Kota Bharu
Attendance: 4,369
Referee: Hamdan Awang

Kelantan won 2–1 on aggregate.

26 October 2022
21:00

Kelantan United	0–2	Selangor
	Report	Caion 37', 63'

Sultan Muhammad IV Stadium, Kota Bharu
Attendance: 1,648
Referee: Zamzaidi Katimin
1 November 2022
21:00

Selangor	1–0	Kelantan United
Nik Akif 90+1' (o.g.)	Report

MBPJ Stadium, Petaling Jaya
Attendance: 1,982
Referee: Usaid Jamal

Selangor won 3–0 on aggregate.

26 October 2022
21:00

Penang	2–2	Kuching City
Lucas Silva 38', 77'	Report	Alif 45'; Kamara 73'

City Stadium, Penang
Attendance: 391
Referee: Nafeez Abd Wahab
31 October 2022
20:15

Kuching City	2–1 (a.e.t.)	Penang
Alif 62'; Wan Faiz 118'	Report	Lucas Silva 22'

Sarawak State Stadium, Kuching
Attendance: 5,230
Referee: Shahmi Ismail

Kuching City won 4–3 on aggregate.

26 October 2022
21:00

Petaling Jaya City	0–4	Johor Darul Ta'zim
	Report	Shahrul 5'; Safawi 39'; Akhyar 70'; Forestieri 80'

MBPJ Stadium, Petaling Jaya
Attendance: 2,747
Referee: Fusser Mad Sallih
31 October 2022
20:15

Johor Darul Ta'zim	2–0	Petaling Jaya City
Bergson 4'; Forestieri 73'	Report

Sultan Ibrahim Stadium, Iskandar Puteri
Attendance: 11,968
Referee: Khirulazuan Kidam

Johor Darul Ta'zim won 6–0 on aggregate.

26 October 2022
21:00

Kedah Darul Aman	1–2	Negeri Sembilan
Fayadh 7'	Report	Rashid 42'; Alves 67'

Darulaman Stadium, Alor Setar
Attendance: 3,118
Referee: Nazmi Nasaruddin
1 November 2022
21:00

Negeri Sembilan	0–0	Kedah Darul Aman
	Report

Tuanku Abdul Rahman Stadium, Paroi
Attendance: 8,350
Referee: Razlan Joffri Ali

Negeri Sembilan won 2–1 on aggregate.

27 October 2022
21:00

PDRM	0–3	Kuala Lumpur City
	Report	Morales 45+2', 79'; Josué 67'

Kuala Lumpur Stadium, Cheras
Attendance: 660
Referee: Abdul Rahman Wahab
1 November 2022
21:00

Kuala Lumpur City	1–0	PDRM
Zhafri 89'	Report

Kuala Lumpur Stadium, Cheras
Attendance: 507
Referee: S. Logeswaran

Kuala Lumpur City won 4–0 on aggregate.

27 October 2022
21:00

Sri Pahang	1–5	Terengganu
Rodríguez 43'	Report	Sherman 1', 52', 90+1'; Sharif 3'; Faisal 50'

Darul Makmur Stadium, Kuantan
Attendance: 19,770
Referee: Amirul Izwan Yaacob
1 November 2022
21:00

Terengganu	4–2	Sri Pahang
Sherman 2', 45' (pen.); Faisal 29'; Azam 35'	Report	Tuck 71'; Rodríguez 84'

Sultan Mizan Zainal Abidin Stadium, Kuala Nerus
Attendance: 17,350
Referee: Tuan Mohd Yaasin

Terengganu won 9–3 on aggregate.

== Quarter-finals ==
The first legs were played on 5 & 6 November, and the second legs were played on 11 & 12 November 2022.

Team 1	Agg.	Team 2	1st leg	2nd leg
Kuching City	1–2	Sabah	0–1	1–1 (a.e.t.)
Kelantan	0–8	Johor Darul Ta'zim	0–3	0–5
Selangor	4–2	Negeri Sembilan	2–0	2–2
Kuala Lumpur City	1–4	Terengganu	0–1	1–3

=== Matches ===
5 November 2022
20:15

Kuching City	0–1	Sabah
	Report	Baddrol 69'

Sarawak State Stadium, Kuching
Attendance: 20,154
Referee: S. Logeswaran
11 November 2022
20:15

Sabah	1–1 (a.e.t.)	Kuching City
Kagayama 94'	Report	Bacok 83' (o.g.)

Likas Stadium, Kota Kinabalu
Attendance: 6,313
Referee: Zamzaidi Katimin

Sabah won 2–1 on aggregate.

5 November 2022
21:00

Kelantan	0–3	Johor Darul Ta'zim
	Report	Bergson 29'; Syafiq 37'; Velázquez 74'

Sultan Muhammad IV Stadium, Kota Bharu
Attendance: 20,011
Referee: Zulkarnain Zakaria
11 November 2022
20:15

Johor Darul Ta'zim	5–0	Kelantan
Bergson 12', 34', 37'; Syahmi 40'; Nazmi 45+1'	Report

Sultan Ibrahim Stadium, Iskandar Puteri
Attendance: 27,320
Referee: Suhaizi Shukri

Johor Darul Ta'zim won 8–0 on aggregate.

6 November 2022
21:00

Selangor	2–0	Negeri Sembilan
Caion 56' (pen.); Haiqal 90+1'	Report

MBPJ Stadium, Petaling Jaya
Attendance: 3,761
Referee: Amirul Izwan Yaacob
12 November 2022
21:00

Negeri Sembilan	2–2	Selangor
Alves 24' (pen.); Zaquan 45+3'	Report	Caion 10'; Yazan 45'

Tuanku Abdul Rahman Stadium, Paroi
Attendance: 11,149
Referee: Nazmi Nasaruddin

Selangor won 4–2 on aggregate.

6 November 2022
21:00

Kuala Lumpur City	0–1	Terengganu
	Report	Sherman 14'

Kuala Lumpur Stadium, Cheras
Attendance: 4,334
Referee: Nafeez Abd Wahab
12 November 2022
21:00

Terengganu	3–1	Kuala Lumpur City
Ott 22'; Tchétché 64'; Sherman 89'	Report	Haqimi 45+1'

Sultan Mizan Zainal Abidin Stadium, Kuala Nerus
Attendance: 25,355
Referee: Fusser Mad Sallih

Terengganu won 4–1 on aggregate.

== Semi-finals ==
The first legs were played on 15 & 16 November, and the second legs were played on 20 & 21 November 2022.

Team 1	Agg.	Team 2	1st leg	2nd leg
Sabah	1–4	Johor Darul Ta'zim	0–1	1–3
Selangor	3–2	Terengganu	3–1	0–1

=== Matches ===
15 November 2022
20:15

Sabah	0–1	Johor Darul Ta'zim
	Report	Arif 34'

Likas Stadium, Kota Kinabalu
Attendance: 14,000
Referee: Razlan Joffri Ali
20 November 2022
20:15

Johor Darul Ta'zim	3–1	Sabah
Bergson 35'; Forestieri 41'; Syafiq 90+3'	Report	Kagayama 47'

Sultan Ibrahim Stadium, Iskandar Puteri
Attendance: 33,445
Referee: Nazmi Nasaruddin

Johor Darul Ta'zim won 4–1 on aggregate.

16 November 2022
21:00

Selangor	3–1	Terengganu
Ankrah 37'; Caion 43'; Sharul 54'	Report	Tchétché 19'

MBPJ Stadium, Petaling Jaya
Attendance: 14,554
Referee: Zamzaidi Katimin
21 November 2022
21:00

Terengganu	1–0	Selangor
Tchétché 36'	Report

Sultan Mizan Zainal Abidin Stadium, Kuala Nerus
Attendance: 33,352
Referee: Suhaizi Shukri

Selangor won 3–2 on aggregate.

== Final ==
The final will be played at the Bukit Jalil National Stadium in Kuala Lumpur, Malaysia on 26 November 2022.

26 November 2022
21:00 UTC+8

Johor Darul Ta'zim	2–1	Selangor
Bergson 45+2'; Forestieri 59'	Report	Caion 45' (pen.)

Bukit Jalil National Stadium, Kuala Lumpur
Attendance: 79,988
Referee: Nazmi Nasaruddin
