= Lucas González (football manager) =

Colombian football coach (born 1981)

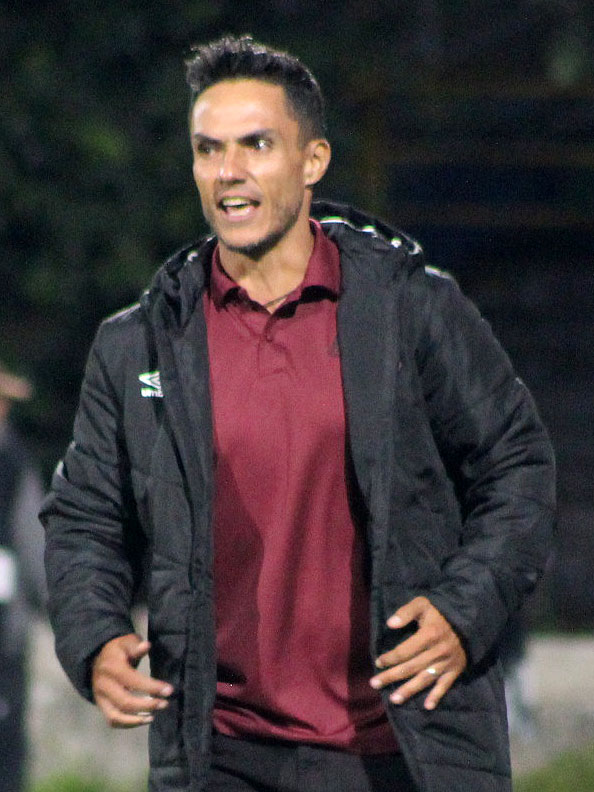
- Lucas González in 2025

Personal information
- Full name: Lucas González Vélez
- Date of birth: 7 June 1981 (age 45)
- Place of birth: Bogotá, Colombia

Team information
- Current team: Atlético Nacional (manager)

Managerial career
- Years: Team
- 2019–2020: Igualada (assistant)
- 2021–2022: Atlético Nacional (youth)
- 2023: Águilas Doradas
- 2023: América de Cali
- 2024: Central Córdoba
- 2025–2026: Deportes Tolima
- 2026–: Atlético Nacional

Lucas González Vélez (born 7 June 1981) is a Colombian football coach, currently in charge of Atlético Nacional.

== Career ==
Born in Bogotá, González started working as a fitness coach before moving to Australia and Spain. In 2017, he joined CE Sabadell FC as a methodology director, after his company Global Football Institute established a partnership with the club; he left in January 2019, as the partnership ended.

In August 2019, González moved to CF Igualada as a fitness and assistant coach. In February 2021, he returned to his home country after being named manager of the under-17 squad of Atlético Nacional.

On 5 August 2022, González left Atlético Nacional, and was announced as Harold Rivera's assistant at Independiente Santa Fe on 23 December. Seven days later, however, he was appointed manager of Águilas Doradas in the top tier.

Despite an outstanding campaign in the 2023 Apertura tournament, in which Águilas Doradas advanced to the semifinal stage but ended up placing last in their group, González resigned on 17 June, once the team's involvement in the competition ended. Twelve days later, he was appointed as manager of América de Cali. Although under his tenure América were able to qualify for the 2024 Copa Sudamericana by finishing fifth in the aggregate table of the 2023 Primera A season, González was sacked by the club on 15 January 2024, less than a week before the start of the 2024 Apertura tournament.

On 19 April 2024, González moved to Argentina after being appointed manager of Central Córdoba, but was sacked on 29 July. On 22 June of the following year, he returned to his home country after being named in charge of Deportes Tolima.

On 27 June 2026, González left Deportes Tolima to return to Atlético Nacional as first team manager.
