= Juan Carlos Álvarez =

Juan Carlos Álvarez may refer to:

- Juan Carlos Álvarez (Colombian footballer) (born 1966), Colombian football manager and former midfielder
- Juan Carlos Álvarez (Spanish footballer) (born 1954), Spanish football manager and former midfielder
