= 2022 Malaysia Cup final =

- Event: 2022 Malaysia Cup
Johor Darul Ta'zim	Selangor
2	1
- Date: 26 November 2022
- Venue: Bukit Jalil National Stadium, Bukit Jalil, Kuala Lumpur
- Man of the Match: Fernando Forestieri (Johor Darul Ta'zim)
- Referee: Nazmi Nasaruddin
- Attendance: 79,988
- Weather: Good; 27 °C (81 °F)

The 2022 Malaysia Cup final was a football match played on 26 November 2022, to determine the champion of the 2022 Malaysia Cup. It was the final game of the 96th edition of the Malaysia Cup, organized by the Football Association of Malaysia.

The final was played at the Bukit Jalil National Stadium in Bukit Jalil, Kuala Lumpur, between Johor Darul Ta'zim and Selangor. Johor won the game 2–1 and clinched their third Malaysia Cup title, and completed their first domestic treble.

The winners should have qualified for the group stage of the 2023–24 AFC Cup. However, as Johor Darul Ta'zim had already qualified for the group stage of the 2023–24 AFC Champions League as the 2022 Malaysia Super League champions, the berth reserved was given to the third-placed team of the 2022 Malaysia Super League, Sabah.

== Venue ==
On 18 November 2022, the Malaysian Football League announced that Bukit Jalil National Stadium would serve as the final venue.

== Route to the final ==
=== Johor Darul Ta'zim ===
Johor Darul Ta'zim (JDT), a Super League team involved in the 2022 AFC Champions League, started in the round of 16. Their first match was an away game against their fellow Super League team, Petaling Jaya City. JDT won 4–0 away from home, before sealing their progress with a 2–0 home win, resulting in a 6–0 aggregate score. In the quarter-finals, JDT faced Kelantan, a Premier League team. They won the first game 3–0, before winning 5–0 in the return leg at home, advancing to the next round with an aggregate score of 8–0. In the semi-final round, JDT faced another Super League team, Sabah. In the first leg at Likas Stadium (away), JDT won 1–0, with the lone goal scored by Arif Aiman in the first half. In the return leg at Sultan Ibrahim Stadium (home), goals from Bergson, Fernando Forestieri, and Syafiq Ahmad gave them a 3–1 win and a 4–1 aggregate victory, which moved them to the final.

=== Selangor ===
Selangor, also of the Super League, began by facing Kelantan United in the round of 16. In the first away leg, Selangor eventually won 2–0 with a two goals scored by Caion, followed by a 1–0 victory at home, with 3–0 on aggregate. In the quarter-finals, Selangor faced their Super League rivals Negeri Sembilan. In the first leg at home, Selangor won 2–0 thanks to a goals by Caion and Aliff Haiqal. In the second leg away from home, the match ended in a 2–2 draw, but Selangor advanced through the next round with the aggregate score of 4–2. Selangor's semi-final was against another Super League club, Terengganu. Selangor started with a 3–1 home win with goals by Richmond Ankrah, Caion and Sharul Nazeem; all three goals were scored from corners. In the second leg, five days later at the Sultan Mizan Zainal Abidin Stadium, Selangor lost 1–0 with the lone goal by Kipré Tchétché, but progressed to the final with the aggregate score of 3–2.

Johor Darul Ta'zim			Round	Selangor
Opponent	Result	Legs		Opponent	Result	Legs
Petaling Jaya City	6–0	4–0 away; 2–0 home	Round of 16	Kelantan United	3–0	2–0 away; 1–0 home
Kelantan	8–0	3–0 away; 5–0 home	Quarter-finals	Negeri Sembilan	4–2	2–0 home; 2–2 away;
Sabah	4–1	1–0 away; 3–1 home	Semi-finals	Terengganu	3–2	3–1 home; 0–1 away;

== Match details ==
26 November 2022
21:00 UTC+8

Johor Darul Ta'zim	2–1	Selangor
Bergson 45+2'; Forestieri 59'	Report	Caion 45' (pen.)

Bukit Jalil National Stadium, Kuala Lumpur
Attendance: 79,988
Referee: Nazmi Nasaruddin

Johor Darul Ta'zim	Selangor

GK	1	(Malaysia) Farizal Marlias (c)
RB	2	(Malaysia) Matthew Davies	(yellow card) 44' (substituted off) 90'
CB	15	(Malaysia) Feroz Baharudin
CB	32	(Malaysia) Shahrul Saad
LB	22	(Malaysia) Corbin-Ong	(yellow card) 20'
CM	4	(Malaysia) Afiq Fazail	(substituted off) 81'
CM	10	(Argentina) Leandro Velázquez	(yellow card) 35' (substituted off) 90+4'
CM	30	(Malaysia) Natxo Insa
RF	42	(Malaysia) Arif Aiman	(substituted off) 90+4'
CF	9	(Brazil) Bergson
LF	45	(Italy) Fernando Forestieri	(substituted off) 90'
Substitutes:
GK	26	(Malaysia) Haziq Nadzli
DF	7	(Malaysia) Aidil Zafuan
DF	91	(Malaysia) Syahmi Safari	(substituted on) 90'
FW	6	(England) Hong Wan	(substituted on) 81'
MF	8	(Malaysia) Safiq Rahim	(substituted on) 90+4'
MF	13	(Malaysia) Mohamadou Sumareh	(substituted on) 90+4'
MF	19	(Malaysia) Akhyar Rashid	(substituted on) 90'
MF	21	(Malaysia) Nazmi Faiz
FW	28	(Malaysia) Syafiq Ahmad
Coach:
(Argentina) Héctor Bidoglio

GK	1	(Malaysia) Khairulazhan Khalid
RB	2	(Malaysia) Quentin Cheng
CB	33	(Ghana) Richmond Ankrah
CB	44	(Malaysia) Sharul Nazeem
LB	22	(Malaysia) Fazly Mazlan
CM	24	(Ghana) Alex Agyarkwa
CM	88	(Malaysia) Brendan Gan (c)	(substituted off) 76'
CM	99	(Jordan) Baha' Abdel-Rahman	(substituted off) 63'
RF	30	(Myanmar) Hein Htet Aung	(substituted off) 63'
CF	10	(Brazil) Caion	(substituted off) 76'
LF	7	(Malaysia) Mukhairi Ajmal	(yellow card) 69'
Substitutes:
GK	23	(Malaysia) Samuel Somerville
DF	4	(Malaysia) Ashmawi Yakin
DF	13	(Malaysia) R. Dinesh
DF	14	(Malaysia) Zikri Khalili
MF	77	(Malaysia) Aliff Haiqal	(substituted on) 63' (yellow card) 82'
FW	9	(Malaysia) Hakim Hassan	(substituted on) 63'
FW	17	(Malaysia) Danial Asri	(substituted on) 76'
FW	19	(Malaysia) Shahrel Fikri
FW	43	(Malaysia) Syahir Bashah	(substituted on) 76'
Coach:
(Malaysia) Tan Cheng Hoe

Man of the Match:
Fernando Forestieri (Johor Darul Ta'zim)

Assistant referees:
Shafiq Ahmad Said
Nadziran Eziz
Fourth official:
Hariff Md Akhir
Reserve assistant referee:
Usaid Jamal
Hasrol Mohd Amir

- 90 minutes
- 30 minutes of extra time if necessary
- Penalty shoot-out if scores still level
- Nine named substitutes
- Maximum of five substitutions, with a sixth allowed in extra time

== See also ==
- 2022 Malaysia FA Cup
