= 2023 Liga DIMAYOR =

Categoría Primera A season

Liga BetPlay Dimayor
- Season: 2023
- Dates: 24 January – 13 December 2023
- Champions: Apertura: Millonarios (16th title); Finalización: Junior (10th title)
- Relegated: Unión Magdalena; Atlético Huila
- Copa Libertadores: Millonarios; Junior; Águilas Doradas; Atlético Nacional (via Copa Colombia)
- Copa Sudamericana: Independiente Medellín; América de Cali; Deportes Tolima; Alianza Petrolera
- Matches: 452
- Goals: 1,024 (2.27 per match)
- Top goalscorer: Apertura: Marco Pérez (13 goals); Finalización: Carlos Bacca (18 goals)
- Biggest home win: Junior 7–1 U. Magdalena (9 September)
- Biggest away win: Santa Fe 0–5 Águilas Doradas (7 October); Atl. Nacional 0–5 Ind. Medellín (3 December)
- Highest scoring: A. Petrolera 5–3 Águilas Doradas (22 May); Junior 7–1 U. Magdalena (9 September)

The 2023 Categoría Primera A season (officially known as the 2023 Liga BetPlay Dimayor season for sponsorship purposes) was the 76th season of the Categoría Primera A, Colombia's top-flight football league. The season began on 24 January and ended on 13 December 2023.

Two tournaments (Apertura and Finalización) were played in the season, each one of them being an independent championship. In the Torneo Apertura, Millonarios won their sixteenth league title after defeating Atlético Nacional 3–2 on penalty kicks in the finals after a 1–1 draw on aggregate, whilst Junior won their tenth league title in the Torneo Finalización, beating Independiente Medellín 5–3 on penalty kicks in the finals after tying 4–4 on aggregate. Deportivo Pereira were the defending champions, having won the 2022 Finalización tournament.

== Format ==
The competition format for this season was approved by the Extraordinary Assembly of DIMAYOR on 14 December 2022, which decided to keep the same system used in the previous season, with two tournaments (Apertura and Finalización) of three stages each.

== Teams ==
Locations of the 2023 Categoría Primera A teams
Locations of the 2023 Primera A teams in Bogotá
Locations of the 2023 Primera A teams in Medellín

20 teams took part in the season, the top 18 teams from the relegation table of the previous season as well as the 2022 Primera B champions Boyacá Chicó and the winners of the Primera B promotion play-off Atlético Huila. Boyacá Chicó were the first team to earn promotion, winning the Primera B title on 21 November 2022 after beating Atlético Huila in the season's Grand Final, while Atlético Huila themselves ensured promotion to the top flight on 29 November 2022, after winning the promotion play-off against Deportes Quindío. The promoted teams replaced Patriotas and Cortuluá, the bottom two teams in the relegation table of the 2022 season, who were relegated to Primera B.

=== Stadia and locations ===
Team	City	Stadium	Capacity
Águilas Doradas	Rionegro	Alberto Grisales	14,000
Alianza Petrolera	Barrancabermeja	Daniel Villa Zapata	10,400
América de Cali	Cali	Pascual Guerrero	33,130
Atlético Bucaramanga	Bucaramanga	Alfonso López	28,000
Atlético Huila	Neiva	Guillermo Plazas Alcid	22,000
Atlético Nacional	Medellín	Atanasio Girardot	40,043
Boyacá Chicó	Tunja	La Independencia	20,630
Deportes Tolima	Ibagué	Manuel Murillo Toro	28,100
Deportivo Cali	Palmira	Deportivo Cali	44,000
Deportivo Pasto	Pasto	Departamental Libertad	20,665
Deportivo Pereira	Pereira	Hernán Ramírez Villegas	30,297
Envigado	Envigado	Polideportivo Sur	11,000
Independiente Medellín	Medellín	Atanasio Girardot	40,043
Jaguares	Montería	Jaraguay	12,000
Junior	Barranquilla	Metropolitano Roberto Meléndez	49,692
La Equidad	Bogotá	Metropolitano de Techo	8,000
Millonarios	Bogotá	Nemesio Camacho El Campín	36,343
Once Caldas	Manizales	Palogrande	28,678
Santa Fe	Bogotá	Nemesio Camacho El Campín	36,343
Unión Magdalena	Santa Marta	Sierra Nevada	16,000

=== Personnel and kits ===
Team	Manager	Kit manufacturer	Shirt sponsor(s)
Águilas Doradas	(Venezuela) César Farías	Aerosport	
Alianza Petrolera	(Colombia) César Torres	Pin-Go	
América de Cali	(Colombia) Lucas González	Le Coq Sportif	Colanta, Águila, BetPlay
Atlético Bucaramanga	(Argentina) Jorge Ramoa (caretaker)	Lotto	Marsbet, Pool, Clinisports
Atlético Huila	(Colombia) Diego Corredor	Vicbay	Electrohuila, BetPlay
Atlético Nacional	(Colombia) Jhon Jairo Bodmer	Nike	Postobón
Boyacá Chicó	(Colombia) Belmer Aguilar	Geus	
Deportes Tolima	(Colombia) David González	Sheffy	AK-1, BetPlay, Mercacentro, Pool
Deportivo Cali	(Colombia) Jaime de la Pava	Le Coq Sportif (Apertura); Kappa (Finalización)	Wplay, Pastas La Muñeca
Deportivo Pasto	(Colombia) Flabio Torres	Aerosport	Aguardiente Nariño, Banco AV Villas
Deportivo Pereira	(Colombia) Alejandro Restrepo	Oto	Ukumarí
Envigado	(Colombia) Dayron Pérez	Novo	Pool, Colanta
Independiente Medellín	(Uruguay) Alfredo Arias	Adidas	Colanta, Wplay
Jaguares	(Colombia) Carlos Mario Hoyos	Kimo	Colanta, Pool
Junior	(Colombia) Arturo Reyes	Adidas	Olímpica, Águila, Tecnoglass
La Equidad	(Colombia) Alexis García	Attle	Cootrafa
Millonarios	(Colombia) Alberto Gamero	Adidas	Cerveza Andina
Once Caldas	(Colombia) Hernán Darío Herrera	Hillside	Colanta, BetPlay, Wakate
Santa Fe	(Uruguay) Pablo Peirano	Kappa	Colanta, BetPlay
Unión Magdalena	(Colombia) Harold Rivera	Attle	Wplay, Pool

=== Managerial changes ===
Team	Outgoing manager	Manner of departure	Date of vacancy	Position in table	Incoming manager	Date of appointment
Torneo Apertura
Atlético Bucaramanga	(Argentina) Jorge Ramoa	End of caretaker spell	30 October 2022	Pre-season	(Argentina) Raúl Armando (Note: Hernán Darío Gómez had been appointed as manager on 16 November 2022, but resigned on 29 November.)	5 December 2022
Jaguares	(Colombia) Alexis Márquez	Resigned	1 November 2022	Pre-season	(Colombia) Carlos Restrepo	16 November 2022
Santa Fe	(Uruguay) Alfredo Arias	Resigned	30 November 2022	Pre-season	(Colombia) Harold Rivera	23 December 2022
Águilas Doradas	(Colombia) Leonel Álvarez	End of contract	8 December 2022	Pre-season	(Colombia) Lucas González	30 December 2022
Once Caldas	(Colombia) Diego Corredor	Mutual agreement	13 February 2023	18th	(Colombia) Elkin Soto (Note: Caretaker manager.)	13 February 2023
Once Caldas	(Colombia) Elkin Soto	End of caretaker spell	5 March 2023	10th	(Colombia) Pedro Sarmiento	5 March 2023
Junior	(Colombia) Arturo Reyes	Mutual agreement	14 March 2023	20th	(Colombia) Hernán Darío Gómez	15 March 2023
Atlético Bucaramanga	(Argentina) Raúl Armando	Sacked	1 April 2023	13th	(Colombia) Alexis Márquez	3 April 2023
Deportes Tolima	(Colombia) Hernán Torres	Mutual agreement	24 April 2023	12th	(Colombia) Carlos Castro	24 April 2023
Deportes Tolima	(Colombia) Carlos Castro	End of caretaker spell	29 April 2023	12th	(Argentina) Juan Cruz Real	28 April 2023
Independiente Medellín	(Colombia) David González	Mutual agreement	8 May 2023	11th	(Colombia) Sebastián Botero	9 May 2023
Santa Fe	(Colombia) Harold Rivera	Resigned	11 May 2023	9th	(Colombia) Gerardo Bedoya	12 May 2023
Jaguares	(Colombia) Carlos Restrepo	Resigned	18 May 2023	18th	(Colombia) Pompilio Páez	27 May 2023
Unión Magdalena	(Argentina) Claudio Rodríguez	Resigned	19 May 2023	19th	(Colombia) Harold Rivera	27 May 2023
Águilas Doradas	(Colombia) Lucas González	Resigned	17 June 2023	4th, Group A	(Venezuela) César Farías	28 June 2023
Alianza Petrolera	(Colombia) Hubert Bodhert	End of contract	21 June 2023	2nd, Group A	(Colombia) César Torres	25 June 2023
América de Cali	(Costa Rica) Alexandre Guimarães	End of contract	22 June 2023	2nd, Group B	(Colombia) Lucas González	29 June 2023
Torneo Finalización
Santa Fe	(Colombia) Gerardo Bedoya	End of caretaker spell	28 June 2023	Pre-tournament	(Colombia) Hubert Bodhert	25 June 2023
Independiente Medellín	(Colombia) Sebastián Botero	End of caretaker spell	4 July 2023	Pre-tournament	(Uruguay) Alfredo Arias	4 July 2023
Atlético Nacional	(Brazil) Paulo Autuori	Resigned	6 July 2023	Pre-tournament	(Brazil) William Amaral (Note: Originally as caretaker manager, appointed on a permanent basis on 19 July 2023.)	6 July 2023
Deportivo Cali	(Colombia) Jorge Luis Pinto	Resigned	8 July 2023	Pre-tournament	(Colombia) Jaime de la Pava (Note: Sergio Herrera was the caretaker manager for the Torneo Finalización 1st round match against Deportivo Pereira.)	14 July 2023
Envigado	(Colombia) Alberto Suárez	Sacked	25 July 2023	15th	(Colombia) Andrés Orozco	25 July 2023
Junior	(Colombia) Hernán Darío Gómez	Resigned	17 August 2023	17th	(Colombia) Arturo Reyes	17 August 2023
Boyacá Chicó	(Mexico) Mario García	Resigned	17 August 2023	18th	(Colombia) Belmer Aguilar	17 August 2023
Atlético Huila	(Argentina) Néstor Craviotto	Mutual agreement	21 August 2023	11th	(Colombia) Diego Corredor	22 August 2023
Jaguares	(Colombia) Pompilio Páez	Resigned	22 August 2023	14th	(Colombia) Julio Méndez	23 August 2023
Deportes Tolima	(Argentina) Juan Cruz Real	Resigned	6 September 2023	16th	(Spain) José Arastey	7 September 2023
Deportes Tolima	(Spain) José Arastey	End of caretaker spell	18 September 2023	14th	(Colombia) David González	18 September 2023
Jaguares	(Colombia) Julio Méndez	End of caretaker spell	21 September 2023	19th	(Colombia) Carlos Mario Hoyos	21 September 2023
Envigado	(Colombia) Andrés Orozco	End of caretaker spell	25 September 2023	20th	(Colombia) Dayron Pérez	26 September 2023
Atlético Bucaramanga	(Colombia) Alexis Márquez	Resigned	25 September 2023	14th	(Colombia) Rubén Zapata (Colombia) Diego Vargas	26 September 2023
Santa Fe	(Colombia) Hubert Bodhert	Mutual agreement	8 October 2023	6th	(Uruguay) Pablo Peirano	9 October 2023
Atlético Nacional	(Brazil) William Amaral	Sacked	9 October 2023	4th	(Colombia) Jhon Jairo Bodmer	9 October 2023
Atlético Bucaramanga	(Colombia) Rubén Zapata (Colombia) Diego Vargas	Mutual agreement	10 October 2023	16th	(Argentina) Jorge Ramoa (Note: Caretaker manager until the end of the season.)	11 October 2023
Once Caldas	(Colombia) Pedro Sarmiento	Sacked	23 October 2023	17th	(Colombia) Hernán Darío Herrera	23 October 2023

== Torneo Apertura ==
The Torneo Apertura (officially known as Liga BetPlay Dimayor 2023–I) was the first tournament of the 2023 season. It began on 24 January and ended on 24 June 2023.

=== First stage ===
==== Standings ====
Pos	Team	Pld	W	D	L	GF	GA	GD	Pts	Qualification
1	Águilas Doradas	20	11	6	3	32	21	+11	39	Advance to the semi-finals
2	Millonarios	20	10	8	2	30	18	+12	38	Advance to the semi-finals
3	Atlético Nacional	20	9	8	3	26	14	+12	35	Advance to the semi-finals
4	América de Cali	20	9	5	6	32	23	+9	32	Advance to the semi-finals
5	Boyacá Chicó	20	7	9	4	24	18	+6	30	Advance to the semi-finals
6	Alianza Petrolera	20	9	3	8	27	22	+5	30	Advance to the semi-finals
7	Independiente Medellín	20	8	5	7	29	24	+5	29	Advance to the semi-finals
8	Deportivo Pasto	20	8	5	7	22	21	+1	29	Advance to the semi-finals
9	Junior	20	7	7	6	17	17	0	28	
10	Santa Fe	20	7	5	8	29	25	+4	26	
11	La Equidad	20	5	11	4	20	17	+3	26	
12	Deportivo Pereira	20	6	7	7	24	25	−1	25	
13	Deportes Tolima	20	5	9	6	23	26	−3	24	
14	Deportivo Cali	20	5	8	7	20	26	−6	23	
15	Atlético Bucaramanga	20	4	8	8	15	21	−6	20	
16	Envigado	20	4	8	8	14	20	−6	20	
17	Once Caldas	20	4	8	8	17	24	−7	20	
18	Jaguares	20	4	7	9	16	26	−10	19	
19	Unión Magdalena	20	3	10	7	16	30	−14	19	
20	Atlético Huila	20	5	3	12	20	35	−15	18	

Source: Dimayor, Soccerway
Rules for classification: 1) Points, 2) Goal difference, 3) Goals for, 4) Away goals for, 5) Away goals against, 6) Yellow cards, 7) Red cards, 8) Drawing of lots.

==== Results ====
Home \ Away	AGU	ALI	AME	BUC	HUI	NAC	BOY	TOL	CAL	PAS	PER	ENV	DIM	JAG	JUN	EQU	MIL	ONC	SFE	MAG
Águilas Doradas	—	—	—	1–0	2–1	—	2–0	4–2	—	—	2–1	1–0	—	3–0	1–1	1–1	—	—	3–1	—
Alianza Petrolera	2–1	—	—	2–0	2–0	2–1	—	—	0–3	3–1	—	—	0–1	3–0	—	—	—	—	3–1	2–1
América de Cali	1–3	1–0	—	—	—	—	—	—	5–2	—	2–1	1–0	—	0–0	2–0	1–1	—	0–0	—	4–0
Atlético Bucaramanga	—	1–1	2–1	—	—	1–1	—	1–1	—	—	—	0–0	1–2	—	1–0	—	0–2	0–1	—	3–0
Atlético Huila	—	—	0–2	1–2	—	—	3–2	0–0	1–0	1–1	—	—	2–3	—	0–2	—	1–1	2–1	—	—
Atlético Nacional	0–0	—	2–1	—	3–1	—	3–1	—	1–1	—	—	—	1–1	—	0–1	—	0–0	1–0	—	2–0
Boyacá Chicó	—	2–0	1–1	0–0	—	—	—	2–0	—	1–1	3–1	—	2–0	1–0	—	3–1	1–1	—	—	—
Deportes Tolima	—	2–1	2–1	—	2–1	2–2	—	—	1–2	3–1	—	—	—	1–1	0–1	1–0	1–1	—	—	—
Deportivo Cali	1–1	—	1–1	1–1	—	—	0–0	—	—	—	0–1	2–0	—	—	3–2	0–0	—	0–0	—	2–1
Deportivo Pasto	0–0	—	2–4	1–0	—	0–1	—	—	2–1	—	0–0	2–1	—	4–0	1–0	1–1	—	—	—	—
Deportivo Pereira	—	2–1	—	1–1	2–1	0–2	—	1–1	—	—	—	0–0	3–1	—	—	—	2–3	3–1	2–2	—
Envigado	1–2	0–0	—	—	0–1	0–0	0–1	2–1	—	—	—	—	2–1	—	—	1–1	—	0–0	3–2	—
Independiente Medellín	3–0	—	0–1	—	—	1–3	—	1–1	3–0	1–0	—	—	—	1–0	—	—	—	2–2	1–1	4–0
Jaguares	—	—	—	1–1	1–2	2–1	—	—	1–1	0–1	2–0	2–0	—	—	—	1–1	—	1–0	2–2	—
Junior	—	1–0	—	—	—	—	1–1	—	—	—	0–0	1–2	1–1	1–0	—	1–0	1–0	—	1–1	0–0
La Equidad	—	1–1	—	1–0	2–1	0–0	2–2	—	—	—	2–0	—	2–1	—	—	—	—	4–1	0–1	0–0
Millonarios	2–2	3–1	4–3	—	—	—	—	—	2–0	2–0	—	1–1	2–1	2–1	—	0–0	—	—	1–0	—
Once Caldas	1–2	0–3 (Note: Match awarded 3–0 to Alianza Petrolera due to crowd disturbances by Once Caldas fans. The match had ended with Alianza Petrolera winning 2–1.)	—	—	—	—	1–1	1–1	—	0–1	1–1	—	—	—	2–0	—	1–0	—	3–1	1–1
Santa Fe	—	—	2–0	3–0	5–0	0–2	1–0	2–0	3–0	0–2	—	—	—	—	—	—	1–2	—	—	0–0
Unión Magdalena	3–1	—	—	—	2–1	—	0–0	1–1	—	2–1	0–3	1–1	—	1–1	2–2	—	1–1	—	—	—

Source: Dimayor, Soccerway
Legend: Blue = home team win; Yellow = draw; Red = away team win.

=== Semi-finals ===
The eight teams that advanced to the semi-finals were drawn into two groups of four teams, with the top two teams from the first stage being seeded in each group. The two group winners advanced to the finals.

==== Group A ====
Pos	Team	Pld	W	D	L	GF	GA	GD	Pts	Qualification	NAC	ALI	PAS	AGU
1	Atlético Nacional	6	3	3	0	7	4	+3	12	Advance to the Finals	—	1–1	3–2	1–0
2	Alianza Petrolera	6	2	4	0	8	5	+3	10		0–0	—	1–0	5–3
3	Deportivo Pasto	6	1	3	2	6	5	+1	6		1–1	0–0	—	3–0
4	Águilas Doradas	6	0	2	4	4	11	−7	2		0–1	1–1	0–0	—

Source: Dimayor, Soccerway
Legend: Blue = home team win; Yellow = draw; Red = away team win.
Rules for classification: 1) Points, 2) First stage position (only applies for the seeded team, if it is involved in a tie), 3) Goal difference, 4) Goals for, 5) Away goals for, 6) Away goals against, 7) Yellow cards, 8) Red cards, 9) First stage position.

==== Group B ====
Pos	Team	Pld	W	D	L	GF	GA	GD	Pts	Qualification	MIL	AME	BOY	DIM
1	Millonarios	6	4	1	1	9	6	+3	13	Advance to the Finals	—	2–1	1–0	2–1
2	América de Cali	6	3	1	2	8	6	+2	10		0–1	—	3–2	2–0
3	Boyacá Chicó	6	2	2	2	6	6	0	8		2–1	1–1	—	1–0
4	Independiente Medellín	6	0	2	4	3	8	−5	2		2–2	0–1	0–0	—

Source: Dimayor, Soccerway
Legend: Blue = home team win; Yellow = draw; Red = away team win.
Rules for classification: 1) Points, 2) First stage position (only applies for the seeded team, if it is involved in a tie), 3) Goal difference, 4) Goals for, 5) Away goals for, 6) Away goals against, 7) Yellow cards, 8) Red cards, 9) First stage position.

=== Finals ===
21 June 2023
20:00 UTC−5

Atlético Nacional	0–0	Millonarios
	Report

Estadio Atanasio Girardot, Medellín
Referee: Carlos Ortega

24 June 2023
19:00 UTC−5

Millonarios	1–1	Atlético Nacional
Llinás 70'	Report	Je. Duque 31'
Penalties
Valencia (penalty missed); Arias (penalty scored); Pereira (penalty scored); Ruiz (penalty missed); Vásquez (penalty scored)	3–2	(penalty missed) Pabón; (penalty scored) Banguero; (penalty scored) Je. Duque; (penalty missed) Zapata; (penalty missed) Barrera

Estadio El Campín, Bogotá
Referee: Carlos Betancur

Tied 1–1 on aggregate, Millonarios won on penalties.

=== Top scorers ===
Rank	Player	Club	Goals
1	(Colombia) Marco Pérez	Águilas Doradas	13
2	(Argentina) Gonzalo Lencina	Atlético Bucaramanga	9
2	(Colombia) Edwar López	Deportivo Pasto	9
2	(Colombia) Dayro Moreno	Once Caldas	9
5	(Colombia) Diber Cambindo	Independiente Medellín	8
5	(Colombia) Jefferson Duque	Atlético Nacional	8
5	(Argentina) Facundo Suárez	América de Cali	8
8	(Colombia) Isaac Camargo	Unión Magdalena	7

Source: Soccerway

== Torneo Finalización ==
The Torneo Finalización (officially known as Liga BetPlay Dimayor 2023–II) is the second and last tournament of the 2023 season. It began on 14 July and ended on 13 December 2023.

=== First stage ===
==== Standings ====
Pos	Team	Pld	W	D	L	GF	GA	GD	Pts	Qualification
1	Águilas Doradas	20	12	8	0	35	12	+23	44	Advance to the semi-finals
2	Independiente Medellín	20	10	9	1	30	15	+15	39	Advance to the semi-finals
3	América de Cali	20	10	7	3	35	19	+16	37	Advance to the semi-finals
4	Deportes Tolima	20	11	4	5	23	17	+6	37	Advance to the semi-finals
5	Atlético Nacional	20	10	3	7	33	21	+12	33	Advance to the semi-finals
6	Junior	20	8	6	6	29	17	+12	30	Advance to the semi-finals
7	Millonarios	20	8	6	6	21	20	+1	30	Advance to the semi-finals
8	Deportivo Cali	20	7	7	6	25	25	0	28	Advance to the semi-finals
9	Alianza Petrolera	20	8	4	8	18	24	−6	28	
10	La Equidad	20	5	11	4	19	20	−1	26	
11	Atlético Bucaramanga	20	7	5	8	20	22	−2	26	
12	Deportivo Pasto	20	6	7	7	16	20	−4	25	
13	Santa Fe	20	6	6	8	21	29	−8	24	
14	Once Caldas	20	5	7	8	21	22	−1	22	
15	Unión Magdalena	20	5	7	8	21	32	−11	22	
16	Atlético Huila	20	4	7	9	18	22	−4	19	
17	Deportivo Pereira	20	5	4	11	19	28	−9	19	
18	Boyacá Chicó	20	3	10	7	15	26	−11	19	
19	Jaguares	20	3	5	12	7	21	−14	14	
20	Envigado	20	2	7	11	18	32	−14	13	

Source: Dimayor, Soccerway
Rules for classification: 1) Points, 2) Goal difference, 3) Goals for, 4) Away goals for, 5) Away goals against, 6) Yellow cards, 7) Red cards, 8) Drawing of lots.

==== Results ====
Home \ Away	AGU	ALI	AME	BUC	HUI	NAC	BOY	TOL	CAL	PAS	PER	ENV	DIM	JAG	JUN	EQU	MIL	ONC	SFE	MAG
Águilas Doradas	—	3–0	2–2	—	—	2–0	—	—	1–0	3–0	—	3–1	1–1	—	—	—	2–0	2–1	—	2–1
Alianza Petrolera	—	—	2–3	1–0	—	—	1–1	0–1	—	—	2–1	3–1	—	—	1–5	1–0	1–0	2–1	—	—
América de Cali	—	—	—	1–2	1–0	4–1	5–0	1–0	3–0	1–1	—	—	1–3	—	—	—	1–0	—	2–0	—
Atlético Bucaramanga	1–1	0–1	—	—	1–0	—	1–0	—	1–0	0–2	1–1	—	—	3–0	—	2–3	—	—	1–1	—
Atlético Huila	1–1	0–0	—	—	—	0–1	—	3–0	—	—	2–0	3–3	—	0–0	—	1–1	—	—	2–2	2–1
Atlético Nacional	—	2–0	—	2–1	—	—	—	2–3	—	2–0	2–0	3–0	1–2	2–1	—	5–0	—	—	3–0	—
Boyacá Chicó	0–1	—	—	—	1–1	1–3	—	—	1–1	—	—	1–0	—	—	2–1	0–2	—	2–1	1–1	0–0
Deportes Tolima	1–1	—	—	0–0	1–0	—	2–0	—	—	—	2–3	2–0	1–1	—	—	—	—	3–1	1–0	2–1
Deportivo Cali	—	1–0	0–0	—	1–0	1–1	—	2–0	—	4–0	—	—	2–2	2–0	—	—	0–0	—	2–2	—
Deportivo Pasto	—	1–1	—	—	1–0	—	1–1	1–2	—	—	—	—	0–0	1–0	—	—	0–0	1–0	2–0	3–1
Deportivo Pereira	0–0	—	2–4	—	—	—	1–1	—	0–2	2–1	—	—	—	3–0	0–2	1–0	—	1–2	—	1–2
Envigado	2–2	—	0–0	1–3	—	—	—	—	3–0	1–1	2–3	—	—	1–0	1–2	—	1–2	—	—	0–0
Independiente Medellín	—	2–1	—	2–0	2–0	1–0	1–1	—	—	—	1–0	1–0	—	—	1–0	2–2	1–1	—	—	—
Jaguares	0–1	0–0	0–1	—	—	—	2–1	0–1	—	1–0	—	—	1–1	—	0–0	—	2–0	—	—	0–1
Junior	0–1	—	4–3	1–1	2–0	1–1	—	0–1	3–2	0–0	—	—	—	—	—	—	—	1–0	—	7–1
La Equidad	1–1	—	1–1	—	—	—	0–0	0–0	1–1	1–0	—	1–1	—	2–0	0–0	—	2–1	—	—	—
Millonarios	—	—	—	3–0	2–1	1–0	1–1	1–0	—	—	0–0	—	—	—	1–0	—	—	2–1	2–4	1–1
Once Caldas	—	—	1–1	1–0	1–2	1–1	—	—	4–0	—	1–0	0–0	2–2	0–0	—	1–1	—	—	—	—
Santa Fe	0–5	0–1	—	—	—	—	—	—	—	—	1–0	2–0	1–0	1–0	1–0	1–1	2–3	0–1	—	—
Unión Magdalena	—	2–0	0–0	1–2	—	2–1	—	—	3–4	—	—	—	0–4	—	0–0	1–0	—	1–1	2–2	—

Source: Dimayor, Soccerway
Legend: Blue = home team win; Yellow = draw; Red = away team win.

=== Semi-finals ===
The eight teams that advanced to the semi-finals were drawn into two groups of four teams, with the top two teams from the first stage being seeded in each group. The two group winners advanced to the finals.

==== Group A ====
Pos	Team	Pld	W	D	L	GF	GA	GD	Pts	Qualification	JUN	TOL	AGU	CAL
1	Junior	6	4	1	1	15	7	+8	13	Advance to the Finals	—	4–2	3–1	3–0
2	Deportes Tolima	6	4	0	2	15	8	+7	12		3–1	—	0–1	4–2
3	Águilas Doradas	6	2	2	2	7	10	−3	8		1–1	0–4	—	3–1
4	Deportivo Cali	6	0	1	5	4	16	−12	1		0–3 (Note: Match suspended after 75 minutes of play and awarded 3–0 to Junior due to pitch invasion and crowd disturbances by Deportivo Cali fans. The score at the time of suspension was 0–2.)	0–2	1–1	—

Source: Dimayor, Soccerway
Legend: Blue = home team win; Yellow = draw; Red = away team win.
Rules for classification: 1) Points, 2) First stage position (only applies for the seeded team, if it is involved in a tie), 3) Goal difference, 4) Goals for, 5) Away goals for, 6) Away goals against, 7) Yellow cards, 8) Red cards, 9) First stage position.

==== Group B ====
Pos	Team	Pld	W	D	L	GF	GA	GD	Pts	Qualification	DIM	MIL	NAC	AME
1	Independiente Medellín	6	5	0	1	13	5	+8	15	Advance to the Finals	—	2–1	2–1	2–1
2	Millonarios	6	3	0	3	5	5	0	9		1–0	—	0–1	2–1
3	Atlético Nacional	6	3	0	3	4	8	−4	9		0–5 (Note: Match suspended after 80 minutes of play and awarded to Independiente Medellín due to crowd disturbances by Atlético Nacional fans. The 0–5 score at the time of suspension stood as final since it was higher than the score awarded by walkover (3–0).)	0–1	—	1–0
4	América de Cali	6	1	0	5	4	8	−4	3		1–2	1–0	0–1	—

Source: Dimayor, Soccerway
Legend: Blue = home team win; Yellow = draw; Red = away team win.
Rules for classification: 1) Points, 2) First stage position (only applies for the seeded team, if it is involved in a tie), 3) Goal difference, 4) Goals for, 5) Away goals for, 6) Away goals against, 7) Yellow cards, 8) Red cards, 9) First stage position.

=== Finals ===
10 December 2023
16:00 UTC−5

Junior	3–2	Independiente Medellín
Bacca 4', 71'; Enamorado 16'	Report	Ortíz 40'; Die. Moreno 88'

Estadio Metropolitano Roberto Meléndez, Barranquilla
Referee: Andrés Rojas

13 December 2023
20:00 UTC−5

Independiente Medellín	2–1	Junior
Varela 14'; Cetré 56'	Report	Hernández 90'
Penalties
Torres (penalty missed); Ricaurte (penalty scored); Pons (penalty scored); Chaverra (penalty scored)	3–5	(penalty scored) Bacca; (penalty scored) Herrera; (penalty scored) Rodríguez; (penalty scored) Fuentes; (penalty scored) Berrío

Estadio Atanasio Girardot, Medellín
Referee: Nicolás Gallo

Tied 4–4 on aggregate, Junior won on penalties.

=== Top scorers ===
Rank	Player	Club	Goals
1	(Colombia) Carlos Bacca	Junior	18
2	(Colombia) Edwuin Cetré	Independiente Medellín	15
2	(Colombia) Marco Pérez	Águilas Doradas	15
4	(Colombia) Dayro Moreno	Once Caldas	11
5	(Colombia) Diego Herazo	Deportes Tolima	9
5	(Colombia) Luis Sandoval	Deportivo Cali	9
7	(Brazil) Marcus Vinicius	Atlético Huila	8
7	(Venezuela) Eric Ramírez	Atlético Nacional	8
7	(Colombia) Adrián Ramos	América de Cali	8
10	(Colombia) Jhon Córdoba	Atlético Bucaramanga	7
10	(Venezuela) Luis González	Junior	7
10	(Paraguay) Gustavo Ramírez	Deportivo Cali	7
10	(Colombia) Gustavo Torres	Unión Magdalena	7

Source: Soccerway

=== Attendances ===
The clubs with an average home league attendance of at least 10,000 in the 2023–II season:

#	Club	Average
1	Millonarios	23,071
2	América de Cali	20,526
3	Junior	19,099
4	Independiente Medellín	19,083
5	Atlético Nacional	16,914
6	Deportivo Cali	16,717

== Aggregate table ==
Pos	Team	Pld	W	D	L	GF	GA	GD	Pts	Qualification
1	Águilas Doradas	52	25	18	9	78	54	+24	93	Qualification for Copa Libertadores second stage
2	Millonarios (C)	54	25	17	12	66	50	+16	92	Qualification for Copa Libertadores group stage
3	Atlético Nacional	54	25	16	13	71	48	+23	91	Qualification for Copa Libertadores second stage (Note: Atlético Nacional qualified for the Copa Libertadores second stage by winning the 2023 Copa Colombia.)
4	Independiente Medellín	54	24	16	14	79	56	+23	88	Qualification for Copa Sudamericana first stage
5	América de Cali	52	23	13	16	79	56	+23	82	Qualification for Copa Sudamericana first stage
6	Junior (C)	48	20	14	14	65	45	+20	74	Qualification for Copa Libertadores group stage
7	Deportes Tolima	46	20	13	13	61	51	+10	73	Qualification for Copa Sudamericana first stage
8	Alianza Petrolera	46	19	11	16	53	51	+2	68	Qualification for Copa Sudamericana first stage
9	Deportivo Pasto	46	15	15	16	44	46	−2	60	
10	Boyacá Chicó	46	12	21	13	45	50	−5	57	
11	La Equidad	40	10	22	8	39	37	+2	52	
12	Deportivo Cali	46	12	16	18	49	67	−18	52	
13	Santa Fe	40	13	11	16	50	54	−4	50	
14	Atlético Bucaramanga	40	11	13	16	35	43	−8	46	
15	Deportivo Pereira	40	11	11	18	43	53	−10	44	
16	Once Caldas	40	9	15	16	38	46	−8	42	
17	Unión Magdalena	40	8	17	15	37	62	−25	41	
18	Atlético Huila	40	9	10	21	38	57	−19	37	
19	Envigado	40	6	15	19	32	52	−20	33	
20	Jaguares	40	7	12	21	23	47	−24	33	

Source: Dimayor
Rules for classification: 1) Points, 2) Goal difference, 3) Goals for, 4) Away goals for, 5) Away goals against, 6) Yellow cards, 7) Red cards, 8) Drawing of lots.
(C) Champions

== Relegation ==
A separate table is kept to determine the teams that are relegated to the Categoría Primera B for the next season. This table is elaborated from a sum of all first stage games played in the three most recent seasons (including the 2021–I, 2021–II, 2022–I, 2022–II, 2023–I, and 2023–II tournaments), with the points earned being averaged per match played. The bottom two teams of the relegation table at the end of the season were relegated to Categoría Primera B.

Pos	Team	2021 Pts	2022 Pts	2023 Pts	2023 GF	2023 GA	2023 GD	Total Pld	Total Pts	Avg.	Relegation
1	Millonarios	69	74	68	51	38	13	118	211	1.79	
2	Atlético Nacional	76	66	68	59	35	24	118	210	1.78	
3	Deportes Tolima	66	66	61	46	43	3	118	193	1.64	
4	Independiente Medellín	52	67	68	59	39	20	118	187	1.58	
5	Junior	62	63	58	46	34	12	118	183	1.55	
6	América de Cali	58	54	69	67	42	25	118	181	1.53	
7	Águilas Doradas	39	58	83	67	33	34	118	180	1.53	
8	Santa Fe	58	61	50	50	54	–4	118	169	1.43	
9	La Equidad	55	58	52	39	37	2	118	165	1.4	
10	Atlético Bucaramanga	51	59	46	35	43	–8	118	156	1.32	
11	Deportivo Pereira	51	55	44	43	53	–10	118	150	1.27	
12	Deportivo Pasto	39	54	54	38	41	–3	118	147	1.25	
13	Deportivo Cali	62	34	51	45	51	–6	118	147	1.25	
14	Boyacá Chicó	—	—	49	39	44	–5	40	49	1.23	
15	Alianza Petrolera	37	46	58	45	46	–1	118	141	1.19	
16	Once Caldas	37	56	42	38	46	–8	118	135	1.14	
17	Envigado	44	57	33	32	52	–20	118	134	1.14	
18	Jaguares	52	47	33	23	47	–24	118	132	1.12	
19	Unión Magdalena (R)	—	40	41	37	62	–25	80	81	1.01	Relegation to Categoría Primera B
20	Atlético Huila (R)	—	—	37	38	57	–19	40	37	0.93	Relegation to Categoría Primera B

Source: Dimayor
Rules for classification: 1) average, 2) 2023 points, 3) 2023 goal difference, 4) 2023 goals scored, 5) 2023 away goals scored, 6) 2023 away goals against, 7) 2023 wins, 8) 2023 yellow cards, 9) 2023 red cards, 10) drawing of lots.

== See also ==
- 2023 Categoría Primera B season
- 2023 Copa Colombia
