= Gonzalo Lencina =

Argentine footballer

Personal information
- Date of birth: 18 October 1997 (age 29)
- Place of birth: Alta Gracia, Argentina
- Position: Forward

Team information
- Current team: Platense
- Number: 99

Youth career
- Club Malvinas
- Deportivo Norte
- Belgrano

Senior career*
Years	Team	Apps	(Gls)
2019–2025	Belgrano	9	(1)
2020–2021	→ Gimnasia Jujuy (loan)	35	(3)
2022	→ Atlético Rafaela (loan)	18	(5)
2023	→ Atlético Bucaramanga (loan)	19	(9)
2023	→ Atlético Junior (loan)	15	(1)
2024	→ Deportivo Pereira (loan)	11	(3)
2025–2026	Deportes Tolima	42	(12)
2026–	Platense	21	(1)
- * Club domestic league appearances and goals as of 17:22, 22 November 2026 (UTC)

Gonzalo Lencina (born 18 October 1997) is an Argentine professional footballer who plays as a forward for Platense .

== Career ==
Lencina is a product of the Club Malvinas, Deportivo Norte and Belgrano youth systems. Diego Osella was the manager who gave Lencina his professional debut, he substituted the forward on during a Primera División loss to Racing Club on 16 March 2019; he featured for fourteen minutes at the Estadio Presidente Juan Domingo Perón.

On 5 October 2020, Lencina extended his contract with Belgrano until December 2023 and was immediately loaned out to fellow league club Gimnasia Jujuy until the end of 2021, with a purchase option. In January 2022, Lencina moved to Atlético de Rafaela, once again on a loan deal, until the end of 2022.

== Personal life ==
In November 2018, Lencina was involved in a three-vehicle traffic collision on the Atilio López Highway in Alta Gracia. Despite one vehicle being totalled and some occupants needing fire department assistance after becoming trapped, no serious injuries occurred.

== Career statistics ==
As of 25 May 2025.

Appearances and goals by club, season and competition
Club	Division	League			Cup		Continental		Total	
Club	Division	Season	Apps	Goals	Apps	Goals	Apps	Goals	Apps	Goals
Belgrano	Primera División	2018-19	3	0	0	0	—		3	0
Belgrano	Primera B Nacional	2019-20	6	1	0	0	—		6	1
Belgrano	Total		9	1	0	0	0	0	9	1
Gimnasia Jujuy	Primera B Nacional	2020-21	7	0	—		—		7	0
Gimnasia Jujuy	Primera B Nacional	2021	28	3	—		—		28	3
Gimnasia Jujuy	Total		35	3	0	0	0	0	35	3
Atlético Rafaela	Primera B Nacional	2022	33	11	—		—		33	11
Atlético Bucaramanga	Categoría Primera A	2023	19	9	—		—		19	9
Atlético Junior	Categoría Primera A	2023	15	1	2	0	—		17	1
Deportivo Pereira	Categoría Primera A	2024	11	3	0	0	—		11	3
Deportes Tolima	Categoría Primera A	2025	18	8	0	0	2	0	20	8
Career total			140	36	2	0	2	0	144	36

== Honours ==
Atlético Junior

- Categoría Primera A: 2023-II
