= Harold Rivera =

Colombian footballer and manager (born 1970)

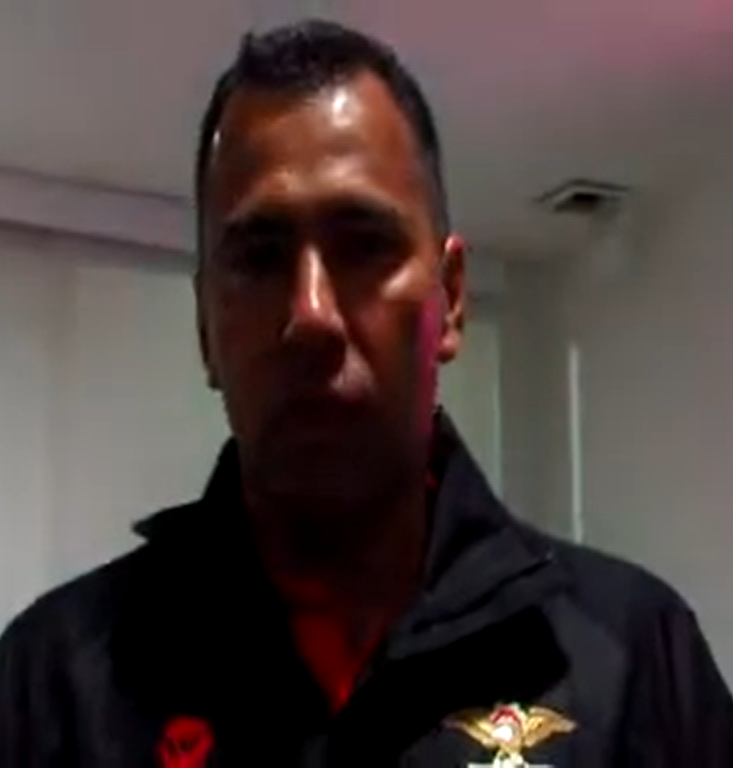
- Rivera in 2014

Personal information
- Full name: Harold Rivera Roa
- Date of birth: 6 July 1970 (age 56)
- Place of birth: Ibagué, Colombia
- Position: Midfielder

Team information
- Current team: Deportes Quindío (head coach)

Youth career
- Deportes Tolima

Senior career*
Years	Team	Apps	(Gls)
1990–1995	Deportes Tolima		
1996	Atlético Huila		
1997	Unión Magdalena		
1998	Junior		
1999–2000	Atlético Bucaramanga		
2001	Millonarios		
2002–2004	Cortuluá		
2005	Deportes Tolima		

Managerial career
- 2008–2011: Colombia U15
- 2011: Colombia (women) (assistant)
- 2012–2013: Colombia U17
- 2013: Patriotas (assistant)
- 2014–2016: Patriotas
- 2017: Atlético Bucaramanga
- 2017–2019: Unión Magdalena
- 2019–2021: Santa Fe
- 2023: Santa Fe
- 2023: Unión Magdalena
- 2024: Patriotas
- 2025–: Deportes Quindío
- * Club domestic league appearances and goals

Harold Rivera Roa (born 6 July 1970) is a Colombian football manager and former player who played as a midfielder. Rivera is the head coach of Categoría Primera B club Deportes Quindío.

== Career ==
Born in Ibagué, Rivera represented Deportes Tolima, Atlético Huila, Unión Magdalena, Junior, Atlético Bucaramanga, Millonarios and Cortuluá as a player. He retired in 2005 with Tolima at the age of 35, and started working with Tolima's youth categories immediately after his retirement.

In 2008, after two years managing the Tolima regional team, Rivera was named manager of the Colombia under-15 national team. In 2011, after a short period as Ricardo Rozo's assistant at the women's national team, he was appointed in charge of the under-17s.

In 2013, Rivera joined Julio Comesaña's staff at Patriotas Boyacá, as his assistant. On 4 February of the following year, he was named manager of the club after Comesaña resigned.

Rivera asked to resign from Patriotas in April 2016 for personal reasons, but the club did not accept and gave him a 60-day leave. He left the club on 5 December of that year, after his contract ended, and took over former club Atlético Bucaramanga twelve days later.

Sacked by Bucaramanga on 5 March 2017, Rivera was named at the helm of another club he represented as a player, Unión Magdalena, on 14 August. He resigned from the club in June 2019, and was appointed manager of Independiente Santa Fe on 7 August.

Rivera led Santa Fe to a runner-up finish in the 2020 Primera A tournament before leaving the club on a mutual agreement on 22 August 2021. He returned to Santa Fe on 23 December 2022, as the new manager for the 2023 season. He resigned from the club on 11 May 2023.

On 27 May 2023, he returned to Unión Magdalena for a second spell as manager. He left Unión Magdalena following the club's relegation to Primera B at the end of the season, and was announced as new manager of Patriotas on 11 December. Rivera resigned from Patriotas on 15 September 2024, with the team placing last in the season's relegation table.

== Personal life ==
Rivera's son, also named Harold, is also a footballer. He also represented Huila.
