= Raúl Armando =

Argentine footballer (born 1965)

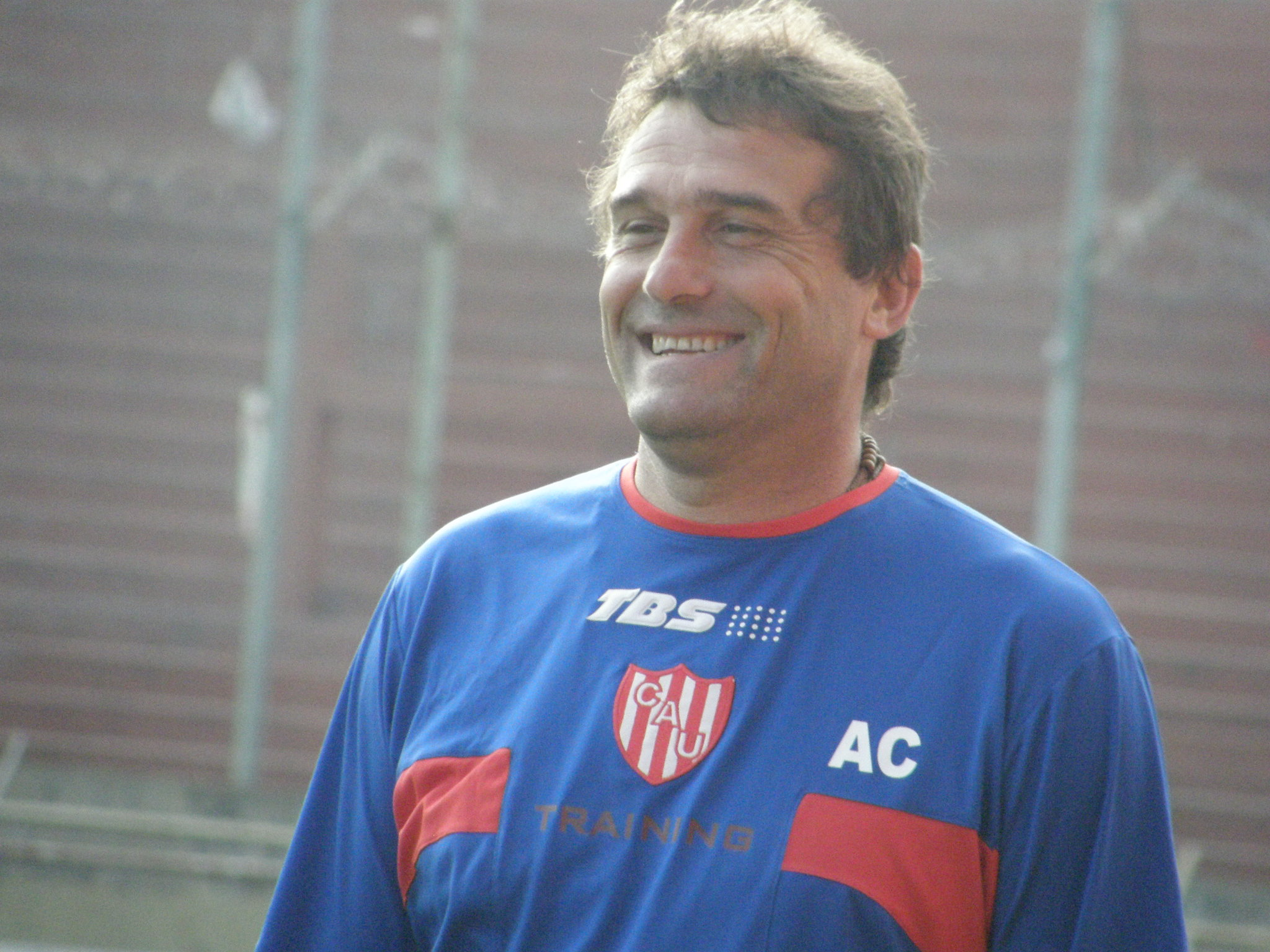
- Armando with Unión de Santa Fe

Personal information
- Full name: Raúl Agustín Armando
- Date of birth: 23 June 1965 (age 61)
- Place of birth: Providencia, Argentina
- Position: Defender

Team information
- Current team: León (assistant)

Youth career
- Unión-SF

Senior career*
Years	Team	Apps	(Gls)
1987–1992	Unión-SF		
1992–1993	San Martín (T)	5	(0)
1993–1994	Unión-SF		
1994	Lanús	2	(0)
1995	Unión-SF		
1996–1997	Patronato		

Managerial career
- Unión-SF (youth)
- 2004: Patronato (assistant)
- 2004–2007: Unión-SF (youth)
- 2007–2009: Sportivo Belgrano (assistant)
- 2010: Tiro Federal de Morteros
- 2010–2012: Unión-SF (assistant)
- 2012–2013: Instituto (assistant)
- 2013–2014: Huracán (assistant)
- 2015–2018: Talleres (assistant)
- 2018–2019: Universidad de Chile (assistant)
- 2019–2021: Newell's Old Boys (assistant)
- 2021–2022: Platense (assistant)
- 2022: Sportivo Belgrano
- 2023: Bucaramanga
- 2024: Independiente del Valle (assistant)
- 2025: Atlético Nacional (assistant)
- 2026–: León (assistant)
- * Club domestic league appearances and goals

Raúl Agustín Armando (born 23 June 1965) is an Argentine football manager and former player who played as a defender.

== Playing career ==
Born in Providencia, Santa Fe Province, Armando represented Unión de Santa Fe for the most of his career, also spending short periods at San Martín de Tucumán, Lanús and Patronato. He retired with the latter in 1997, aged 32.

== Managerial career ==
After working in the youth categories of his main club Unión de Santa Fe, Armando was named Frank Darío Kudelka's assistant at Patronato in 2004. He returned to Unión later in that year, and moved to Sportivo Belgrano in 2007 as the assistant of Cristian Domizzi.

On 5 December 2009, Armando was appointed manager of Tiro Federal de Morteros, but left in June 2010 to return to Unión, again as Kudelka's assistant. He continued to follow Kudelka in the following years, being his assistant at Instituto, Huracán, Talleres de Córdoba, Universidad de Chile and Newell's Old Boys.

In October 2021, Armando joined Claudio Spontón's staff at Platense. He returned to managerial duties on 25 April of the following year, being named in charge of Sportivo Belgrano.

Armando left Sportivo Belgrano on 29 November 2022, and moved to Colombia on 5 December after being named Atlético Bucaramanga manager. He was sacked by the Colombian club on 1 April 2023.
