= Édgar Carvajal =

Colombian footballer and manager (born 1969)

Personal information
- Full name: Édgar Carvajal Villa
- Date of birth: 29 September 1969 (age 57)
- Place of birth: Bello, Colombia
- Position: Defensive midfielder

Team information
- Current team: Jaguares de Córdoba (manager)

Senior career*
Years	Team	Apps	(Gls)
1990	Cúcuta Deportivo	4	(0)
1991–1997	Envigado	370	(8)
1997	Deportivo Pereira		
1998–2002	Independiente Medellín	135	(3)
2000	→ América de Cali (loan)		

Managerial career
- 2003–2010: Independiente Medellín (assistant)
- 2006: Independiente Medellín (interim)
- 2010–2011: Independiente Medellín
- 2011–2013: Independiente Medellín (assistant)
- 2014–2018: Panama (assistant)
- 2018–2019: Ecuador (assistant)
- 2021–2022: Honduras (assistant)
- 2023: Junior (assistant)
- 2024: Águilas Doradas (assistant)
- 2024: Jaguares de Córdoba
- 2024–2025: Universidad Técnica de Cajamarca (assistant)
- 2025–: El Salvador (assistant)
- * Club domestic league appearances and goals

Édgar Carvajal Villa (born 29 September 1969) is a Colombian football manager and former player who played as a midfielder. He is the current assistant manager of El Salvador .

== Playing career ==
Carvajal was born in Bello, Antioquia, and began his career with Cúcuta Deportivo in 1990. He moved to Envigado in the following year, winning the Categoría Primera B and subsequently establishing himself as a starter.

In 1998, after a one-year spell at Deportivo Pereira, Carvajal signed for Independiente Medellín. In 2000, he was loaned to América de Cali, playing in the 2000 Copa Libertadores.

Carvajal retired in 2002, aged 33, due to knee injuries.

== Managerial career ==
Shortly after retiring, Carvajal was appointed Víctor Luna's assistant at Independiente Medellín. He remained in that role for several years, being also an interim in 2006 after the dismissal of Javier Álvarez.

On 27 August 2010, Carvajal was appointed manager of DIM after the dismissal of Leonel Álvarez. On 7 April of the following year, he was replaced by Luna after a poor run of form, and subsequently returned to his assistant role.

Carvajal left Independiente Medellín in 2013, and subsequently became an assistant of Hernán Darío Gómez at the Panama national team. He followed Gómez to the Ecuador national team, the Honduras national team, Junior and Águilas Doradas, always as his assistant.

On 21 August 2024, Carvajal was appointed manager of Jaguares de Córdoba.

== Honours ==
Envigado

- Categoría Primera B: 1991

América de Cali

- Categoría Primera A: 2000
