= Daniel Moreno (Colombian footballer) =

Colombian footballer (born 1995)

Personal information
- Full name: Daniel Moreno Mosquera
- Date of birth: 17 January 1995 (age 31)
- Place of birth: Carepa, Colombia
- Height: 1.80 m (5 ft 11 in)
- Position: Forward

Team information
- Current team: Kayserispor
- Number: 27

Senior career*
Years	Team	Apps	(Gls)
2014–2021	Junior	66	(6)
2014–2018	→ Barranquilla (loan)	66	(12)
2021	Deportes Tolima	7	(1)
2022	Alianza Petrolera	30	(1)
2023–2025	Deportivo Pasto	68	(19)
2024	→ Santa Fe (loan)	18	(0)
2025–2026	Amedspor	55	(17)
2026–	Kayserispor	0	(0)
- * Club domestic league appearances and goals as of 17 August 2026

Daniel Moreno Mosquera (born 17 January 1995) is a Colombian professional footballer who plays as a forward for Turkish TFF First League club Kayserispor.

== Career statistics ==
As of 2 December 2024.

Club	Division	League			Cup		Continental		Total	
Club	Division	Season	Apps	Goals	Apps	Goals	Apps	Goals	Apps	Goals
Barranquilla	Categoría Primera B	2014	1	0	1	0	—		2	0
Barranquilla	Categoría Primera B	2016	23	3	—		—		23	3
Barranquilla	Categoría Primera B	2017	27	6	3	0	—		30	6
Barranquilla	Categoría Primera B	2018	15	3	4	0	—		19	3
Barranquilla	Total		66	12	8	0	—		74	12
Junior	Categoría Primera A	2018	20	3	4	1	7	1	31	5
Junior	Categoría Primera A	2019	35	3	4	0	4	0	43	3
Junior	Categoría Primera A	2020	7	0	1	0	3	0	11	0
Junior	Categoría Primera A	2021	4	0	—		2	0	6	0
Junior	Total		66	6	9	1	16	1	91	8
Deportes Tolima	Categoría Primera A	2021	7	1	4	0	—		11	1
Alianza Petrolera	Categoría Primera A	2022	30	1	1	0	—		31	1
Deportivo Pasto	Categoría Primera A	2023	44	2	1	1	—		45	3
Deportivo Pasto	Categoría Primera A	2024	24	17	3	1	—		27	18
Deportivo Pasto	Total		68	19	4	2	0	0	72	21
Santa Fe	Categoría Primera A	2024	18	0	4	2	—		22	2
Amedspor	TFF 1. Lig	2024–25	17	7	—		—		17	7
Career total			272	46	30	5	16	1	318	52

== Honours ==
Junior

- Categoría Primera A: 2018 Finalización, 2019 Apertura
- Superliga Colombiana: 2019, 2020
