= Juan Carlos Álvarez (Colombian footballer) =

Colombian footballer and manager (born 1966)

Personal information
- Full name: Juan Carlos Álvarez Cárdenas
- Date of birth: 14 February 1966 (age 60)
- Place of birth: Medellín, Colombia
- Position: Midfielder

Youth career
- 1983–1986: Atlético Nacional
- 1987: Independiente Medellín

Senior career*
Years	Team	Apps	(Gls)
1988–1989	Cúcuta Deportivo		
1991–1993	Deportivo Rionegro		
1994–1996	Deportivo Antioquia		
1997	Deportes Quindío		
1998	Atlético Bucaramanga		
1999	Cúcuta Deportivo		

Managerial career
- 2002–2003: Florida Soccer (youth)
- 2004–2005: Florida Soccer (assistant)
- 2006–2008: Deportivo Rionegro (assistant)
- 2009–2013: Envigado (assistant)
- 2013–2014: Independiente Medellín (assistant)
- 2016–2018: Leones
- 2019: Unión Magdalena (assistant)
- 2024: Boyacá Chicó (assistant)
- 2024–2025: Boyacá Chicó
- * Club domestic league appearances and goals

Juan Carlos Álvarez Cárdenas (born 14 February 1966) is a Colombian football manager and former player who played as a midfielder.

== Playing career ==
Born in Medellín, Álvarez represented Atlético Nacional and Independiente Medellín as a youth, but made his senior debut with Cúcuta Deportivo in 1988. After his contract ended in 1989, he worked at the Banco Cafetero before returning to football in 1991 with Deportivo Rionegro.

Álvarez subsequently played for Deportivo Antioquia, Deportes Quindío and Atlético Bucaramanga before retiring with Cúcuta in 1999.

== Managerial career ==
After retiring, Álvarez studied in the Cooperative University of Colombia before joining Florida Soccer as a manager of the under-15 squad. In 2004, he became the assistant of Carlos Pachamé at Antioquia, before joining Óscar Aristizábal's staff at Rionegro under the same role in 2006.

Álvarez followed Aristizábal's staff to Envigado in 2009, also as an assistant. In the following year, he remained at the club despite the managerial change with Pedro Sarmiento, and subsequently followed him to Independiente Medellín.

In December 2015, after spending the previous year travelling in Spain, Álvarez became the manager of Categoría Primera B side Leones. He led the club to a first-ever promotion to the top tier in 2017,

Álvarez left Leones by mutual consent on 24 August 2018, with the club sitting bottom of the table. In the following year, he rejoined Sarmiento's staff at Unión Magdalena, returning to an assistant role.

In March 2022, Álvarez was appointed manager of the Antioquia regional team. He was also an assistant of Jhon Jaime Gómez at Boyacá Chicó in 2024, before becoming manager of the club on 27 October of that year. Álvarez was sacked by Boyacá Chicó on 23 February 2025.
