= Stiven Rodríguez =

Colombian footballer (born 1998)

Steven Rodríguez

Personal information
- Full name: Andrés Steven Rodríguez Ossa
- Date of birth: 13 October 1998 (age 28)
- Place of birth: Medellín, Colombia
- Height: 1.77 m (5 ft 10 in)
- Position: Striker

Team information
- Current team: Deportivo Cali
- Number: 23

Youth career
- Independiente Medellín

Senior career*
Years	Team	Apps	(Gls)
2019–2023	Independiente Medellín	17	(1)
2021	→ Leones (loan)	21	(14)
2021	→ Envigado (loan)	14	(2)
2022	→ Sri Pahang (loan)	17	(12)
2023	Alianza Petrolera	20	(7)
2023–	Junior	66	(16)
2026–	→ Deportivo Cali (loan)	3	(3)
- * Club domestic league appearances and goals as of 1 February 2026

Andrés Steven Rodríguez Ossa (born 13 October 1998), better known as Steven Rodríguez or Tití Rodríguez, is a Colombian professional footballer who plays as a striker for Categoría Primera A club Deportivo Cali, on loan from Junior.

== Career ==
=== Independiente Medellín ===
Rodríguez began his football youth with Under-20 squad, in which he always stood out as a scorer in tournaments such as the National Under-20 Tournament and Antioquia League. In mid 2019 season, due to his outstanding performances in the youth team, he was promoted to the first team squad. He made his professional debut with the first team of Independiente Medellín on January 29, 2019, in the Categoría Primera A match against La Equidad under the manager Octavio Zambrano in a 1–1 draw.

=== Leones ===
On 15 January 2021 he was loaned to Leones to play the first season of the Categoría Primera B where he had an excellent performance being the tournament's top scorer with 16 goals in 19 matches.

=== Envigado ===
On 10 July 2021 he signed for Envigado on loan until the end of 2021 season. He played a total of 15 matches and scored two goals for the club.

=== Sri Pahang ===
He continued his loan spell to join Malaysia Super League side Sri Pahang FC on 29 May 2022 on a six-month loan deal. He scored his first goal with the club in a 2–5 defeat against Penang FC in the FA cup quarter finals. His first league goal for the club saw him scoring a solo-run goal in a 2–0 victory against long-term rival Selangor FC. At the end of the season he scored a total of 12 goals in 17 appearances.

=== Alianza Petrolera ===
In January 2023 he returned to his home country to join Alianza Petrolera on a season-long loan deal. On 14 May 2023, he scored a penalty in a 2–1 victory against Atlético Nacional.

== Career statistics ==
As of 18 August 2022

Club	Country	Season	Apps	Goals
Independiente Medellín	Colombia	2019 -	19	1
→Leones (loan)	Colombia	2021	24	16
→Envigado (loan)	Colombia	2021	15	2
→Sri Pahang FC (loan)	Malaysia	2022 -	9	6

== Honours ==
=== Club ===
==== Independiente Medellin ====
- Copa Colombia: 2019

==== Junior de Barranquilla ====
- Categoría Primera A: 2023-II

=== Individual ===
- Categoria Primera B Top Scorer: 2021 Apertura (16 goals)
