= Caion (footballer) =

Brazilian footballer (born 1990)

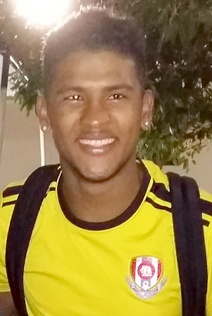
- Caion with Navy in 2018

Personal information
- Full name: Herlison Caion de Sousa Ferreira
- Date of birth: 5 October 1990 (age 36)
- Place of birth: Caxias, Brazil
- Height: 1.84 m (6 ft 0 in)
- Position: Striker

Team information
- Current team: Phrae United
- Number: 77

Youth career
- 2007: Icasa

Senior career*
Years	Team	Apps	(Gls)
2008	Iraty		
2009	Ferroviário		
2009–2010	Gangwon	7	(1)
2012	Caxias	18	(2)
2012–2014	Mirassol	6	(5)
2012	→ Bragantino (loan)	8	(3)
2013	→ Náutico (loan)	5	(1)
2013	→ Chapecoense (loan)	7	(0)
2014	→ GO Audax (loan)	7	(1)
2014	→ Portuguesa (loan)	5	(0)
2014–2015	Al Shorta		(1)
2015–2016	HB Køge	11	(1)
2016	Cruzeiro–RS	13	(4)
2016	Atlético Goianiense	5	(0)
2016–2017	Juventude	19	(2)
2017	Paysandu	11	(2)
2018	Daegu FC	5	(0)
2018	Navy	16	(4)
2019	Paysandu	11	(2)
2019	PT Prachuap	15	(6)
2019	→ Chonburi (loan)	14	(7)
2020	Chonburi	11	(6)
2020–2021	Suphanburi	14	(7)
2021	Muangkan United	17	(12)
2022	Selangor	22	(14)
2023	Kuala Lumpur City	14	(1)
2023	Hanoi	9	(8)
2024	Chonburi	5	(0)
2025	Joinville	6	(0)
2025–	Phrae United	3	(4)
- * Club domestic league appearances and goals as of 26 August 2025

Herlison Caion de Sousa Ferreira (born 5 October 1990), simply known as Caion, is a Brazilian footballer who plays as a striker for Phrae United.

== Club career ==
=== Early career ===
Born in Caxias, Maranhão, Caion made his senior debuts with Iraty SC in 2008, after being a youth player for Icasa in the previous year.

In 2009, he joined Ferroviário. After three months playing for the side in the state leagues, he moved abroad.

=== Gangwon FC ===
On 30 March 2009, Caion joined K-League newly formed side Gangwon FC, thus becoming the club's first-ever Brazilian player.

He made his debut for Gangwon on 5 May, against Incheon United, for that year's League Cup, assisting Park Jong-Jin in Gangwon's first goal. He made his league debut on 25 July, against Busan I'Park, as a substitute. Caion scored his first goal in the last match of 2009 K-League, netting the winner against Jeju United.

In the following season, Caion only played in the reserve league, rescinded his link in June 2010.

=== Back to Brazil ===
After cancelling his link with Gangwon, Caion returned to Brazil, but only joined a side in November 2011, signing with Caxias. On 25 May 2012, he moved to Mirassol.

On 6 September, after scoring five goals in only six matches, Caion joined Bragantino on loan. After his return to Mirassol, he netted twice in a 6–2 routing over Palmeiras on 27 March 2013.

On 13 May Caion joined Série A side Náutico. However, three months later he moved to Chapecoense.

In January 2014 Caion joined newly promoted side Grêmio Osasco Audax. On 23 April, he moved to Portuguesa. However, two months later he was released by Lusa.

=== Move to Iraq ===
In August 2014, Caion joined Al Shorta, the defending Iraqi Premier League champions. Caion became the club's second ever Brazilian player after Cristiano da Silva Santos who left the club in June 2014. Caion scored his first goal in a 2-1 win over Al-Minaa in the league, opening the scoring in the match with an exquisite left-foot finish across the goalkeeper and into the net. He scored his second and final goal in the 2015 AFC Cup as Al-Shorta beat Al-Jazeera 4–0 to top their group and advance to the knockout stage.

=== HB Køge ===
In August 2015 Caion signed a contract with the Danish 1st Division club HB Køge. In January 2016 he and the club agreed to end the contract.

=== Chonburi FC (loan) ===
In June 2019, Caion signed a contract with Chonburi FC on loan from PT Prachuap and scored in his debut help team won over Buriram United 1–0.

=== Selangor ===
On 27 December 2021, it was confirmed that Caion had signed with Malaysia Super League club Selangor for 2022 season.

=== Hanoi FC ===
On 24 June 2023, it was confirmed that Caion had signed with V.League 1 club Hanoi FC in the mid-season transfer window. The following day, he made his league debut in a 2–1 away win against Khanh Hoa FC. On 17 July, Caion scored a hat-trick in a 4–2 home win over Binh Dinh. On 2 August, Caion scored twice in a 3–1 win against rivals Haiphong FC. Ten days later, he scored his second hat-trick for the club, helping his side to a 3–1 away league victory against Dong A Thanh Hoa. Ending his first V.League 1 campaign with 8 goals in 9 games.

== Career statistics ==
As of 21 June 2010

Club performance			League		Cup		League Cup		Total	
Season	Club	League	Apps	Goals	Apps	Goals	Apps	Goals	Apps	Goals
South Korea			League		KFA Cup		League Cup		Total	
2009	Gangwon FC	K League 1	7	1	1	0	2	0	10	1
2010	Gangwon FC	K League 1	0	0	0	0	0	0	0	0
Career total			7	1	1	0	2	0	10	1
