= 2020 Copa Colombia =

Copa BetPlay Dimayor 2020

Tournament details
- Country: Colombia
- Dates: 19 February 2020 – 11 February 2021
- Teams: 36

Final positions
- Champions: Independiente Medellín (3rd title)
- Runners-up: Deportes Tolima
- 2022 Copa Sudamericana: Independiente Medellín

Tournament statistics
- Matches played: 54
- Goals scored: 124 (2.3 per match)
- Top goal scorer: Diber Cambindo (5 goals)

The 2020 Copa Colombia, officially the 2020 Copa BetPlay Dimayor for sponsorship reasons, was the 18th edition of the Copa Colombia, the national cup competition for clubs of DIMAYOR. The tournament was contested by 36 teams and began on 19 February 2020. It concluded on 11 February 2021, with the champions qualifying for the 2022 Copa Sudamericana. Independiente Medellín were the defending champions and successfully defended their title by beating Deportes Tolima 5–4 on penalties in the final after tying 1–1 over 90 minutes.

On 13 March 2020, after a meeting with its member clubs, DIMAYOR announced the temporary suspension of the tournament, along with the Primera A and Primera B ones, due to the COVID-19 pandemic. The competition was suspended until 23 September 2020.

== Format ==
The format for the 2020 Copa Colombia was the same one used for the 2018 edition, with the competition being played in a single-elimination format in its entirety, without any group stages. The 16 Categoría Primera B teams entered the competition in the first stage, being drawn into eight ties. After two stages, four Primera B teams qualified for the third stage, along with the twelve Categoría Primera A teams that did not enter international competition in the 2020 season, which entered the cup at that stage. Finally, in the round of 16, the eight third stage winners were joined by the four Copa Libertadores qualifiers (Junior, América de Cali, Deportes Tolima, and Independiente Medellín), as well as the four Copa Sudamericana qualifiers (Deportivo Cali, Atlético Nacional, Millonarios, and Deportivo Pasto), which entered the competition at this point.

Due to the suspension of the competition caused by the COVID-19 pandemic, on 9 September 2020 DIMAYOR announced that, starting from the round of 16, all subsequent stages up to the final would be played as single-legged ties instead of double-legged ones as originally planned. Furthermore, it was confirmed that the champions would qualify for the 2022 Copa Sudamericana, instead of the 2021 Copa Libertadores as originally planned.

== Schedule ==
The schedule of the competition was as follows, with most rounds rescheduled due to the COVID-19 pandemic:

Round	Draw date	First leg	Second leg
First stage	5 February 2020	19–20 February 2020	4–5 March 2020
Second stage	5 February 2020	23–24 September 2020 (originally 18 March 2020)	30 September – 1 October 2020 (originally 22 April 2020)
Third stage	5 February 2020	21–22 October 2020 (originally 29 July 2020)	28–29 October 2020 (originally 19 August 2020)
Round of 16	2 November 2020	18–19 & 25 November 2020 (originally 2 & 9 September 2020)	
Quarter-finals	2 November 2020	13–14 & 21 January 2021 (originally 16 September & 14 October 2020)	
Semi-finals	2 November 2020	27 & 28 January 2021 (originally 21 & 28 October 2020)	
Final	2 November 2020	11 February 2021 (originally 4 & 11 November 2020)	

== First stage ==
The first stage was played by the 16 Categoría Primera B clubs, eight of which were seeded in the ties according to their placement in the 2019 season aggregate table. The two relegated clubs from the Categoría Primera A (Unión Magdalena and Atlético Huila) along with the remaining Primera B clubs were drawn into each tie. The seeded clubs (Team 2) hosted the second leg.

Team 1	Agg.	Team 2	1st leg	2nd leg
Real San Andrés (2)	2–2 (4–1 p)	Cortuluá (2)	1–1	1–1
Atlético (2)	2–3	Real Cartagena (2)	1–2	1–1
Valledupar (2)	0–4	Deportes Quindío (2)	0–2	0–2
Boca Juniors (2)	1–1 (1–3 p)	Leones (2)	0–0	1–1
Unión Magdalena (2)	4–3	Bogotá (2)	3–0	1–3
Orsomarso (2)	2–2 (3–4 p)	Fortaleza (2)	1–2	1–0
Barranquilla (2)	0–3	Tigres (2)	0–1	0–2
Atlético Huila (2)	4–2	Llaneros (2)	0–2	4–0

=== First leg ===
19 February 2020	Real San Andrés	1–1	Cortuluá	San Andrés Island
14:00	Ramírez 77'	Report	Ucrós 90+3'	Stadium: Erwin O'Neil; Referee: Juan Mira

19 February 2020	Valledupar	0–2	Deportes Quindío	Valledupar
15:30		Report	Cambindo 19' (pen.), 48'	Stadium: Armando Maestre Pavajeau; Referee: Ramiro Pabón

19 February 2020	Boca Juniors	0–0	Leones	Cali
18:00		Report		Stadium: Pascual Guerrero; Referee: Héctor Rivera

19 February 2020	Unión Magdalena	3–0	Bogotá	Santa Marta
20:05	Vanegas 30', 66'; Luna 54'	Report		Stadium: Sierra Nevada; Referee: Ferney Ossa

20 February 2020	Orsomarso	1–2	Fortaleza	Palmira
15:30	Angulo 25'	Report	Caldera 28'; Lara 82'	Stadium: Deportivo Cali; Referee: Jonathan Aguirre

20 February 2020	Barranquilla	0–1	Tigres	Barranquilla
15:30		Report	Montes 30' (pen.)	Stadium: Metropolitano Roberto Meléndez; Referee: Jonathan Tovar

20 February 2020	Atlético Huila	0–2	Llaneros	Neiva
18:00		Report	Navarro 5'; Frigerio 90+5'	Stadium: Guillermo Plazas Alcid; Referee: Nolberto Ararat

20 February 2020	Atlético	1–2	Real Cartagena	Cali
20:05	Correa 2'	Report	Giraldo 10'; Ramos 63'	Stadium: Pascual Guerrero; Referee: Alejandro Moncada

=== Second leg ===
4 March 2020	Llaneros	0–4 (2–4 agg.)	Atlético Huila	Tunja
15:15		Report	Henao 8' (pen.); Moreno 56'; Mostasilla 67'; Asprilla 79'	Stadium: La Independencia; Referee: Luis Delgado

4 March 2020	Leones	1–1 (1–1 agg.) (3–1 p)	Boca Juniors	Envigado
15:30	Gómez 7'	Report	García 45+1'	Stadium: Polideportivo Sur; Referee: Wilmer Gantiva

4 March 2020	Real Cartagena	1–1 (3–2 agg.)	Atlético	Magangué
19:00	Díaz 48'	Report	Cobo 18'	Stadium: Diego de Carvajal; Referee: Diego Ruiz

4 March 2020	Bogotá	3–1 (3–4 agg.)	Unión Magdalena	Bogotá
19:40	Suárez 12'; Caicedo 33', 49'	Report	Hinojosa 75'	Stadium: Metropolitano de Techo; Referee: Juan Pablo Alba

5 March 2020	Fortaleza	0–1 (2–2 agg.) (4–3 p)	Orsomarso	Cota
14:00		Report	Murillo 77'	Stadium: Municipal; Referee: Ramiro Pabón

5 March 2020	Cortuluá	1–1 (2–2 agg.) (1–4 p)	Real San Andrés	Tuluá
15:15	Ibargüen 68'	Report	Duarte 78'	Stadium: Doce de Octubre; Referee: Alexander Ortiz

5 March 2020	Tigres	2–0 (3–0 agg.)	Barranquilla	Bogotá
15:30	Anaya 10'; Ortíz 90+7'	Report		Stadium: Metropolitano de Techo; Referee: Nolberto Ararat

5 March 2020	Deportes Quindío	2–0 (4–0 agg.)	Valledupar	Armenia
17:30	España 5' (pen.), 40'	Report		Stadium: Centenario; Referee: David Espinoza

== Second stage ==
The second stage was played by the eight first stage winners. In each tie, the clubs with the best performance in the first stage hosted the second leg.

Team 1	Agg.	Team 2	1st leg	2nd leg
Atlético Huila (2)	1–3	Real San Andrés (2)	1–1	0–2
Real Cartagena (2)	1–1 (3–5 p)	Tigres (2)	0–0	1–1
Fortaleza (2)	0–2	Deportes Quindío (2)	0–1	0–1
Leones (2)	4–2	Unión Magdalena (2)	1–1	3–1

1. ^{†} Order of legs reversed after original draw.

=== First leg ===
23 September 2020	Real Cartagena	0–0	Tigres	Barranquilla
18:00		Report		Stadium: Romelio Martínez; Attendance: 0 Referee: Carlos García

23 September 2020	Leones	1–1	Unión Magdalena	Itagüí
20:05	Vélez 37'	Report	Luna 49' (pen.)	Stadium: Municipal de Ditaires; Attendance: 0 Referee: Johan Bernal

24 September 2020	Atlético Huila	1–1	Real San Andrés	Neiva
15:15	Asprilla 49'	Report	Carvajal 31'	Stadium: Guillermo Plazas Alcid; Attendance: 0 Referee: Wilmar Montaño

24 September 2020	Fortaleza	0–1	Deportes Quindío	Bogotá
19:40		Report	España 86'	Stadium: Metropolitano de Techo; Attendance: 0 Referee: Luis Delgado

=== Second leg ===
30 September 2020	Tigres	1–1 (1–1 agg.) (5–3 p)	Real Cartagena	Bogotá
19:40	Charria 16'	Report	Ramos 87'	Stadium: Metropolitano de Techo; Attendance: 0 Referee: Mauricio Pérez

1 October 2020	Real San Andrés	2–0 (3–1 agg.)	Atlético Huila	Ibagué
15:15	Espinal 2'; Torres 16'	Report		Stadium: Manuel Murillo Toro; Attendance: 0 Referee: Leonard Mosquera

1 October 2020	Deportes Quindío	1–0 (2–0 agg.)	Fortaleza	Armenia
17:30	Quintero 88'	Report		Stadium: Centenario; Attendance: 0 Referee: Jorge Guzmán

1 October 2020	Unión Magdalena	1–3 (2–4 agg.)	Leones	Santa Marta
19:45	Blanco 68'	Report	Correa 3'; Vélez 25'; Viveros 86'	Stadium: Sierra Nevada; Attendance: 0 Referee: Diego Ulloa

== Third stage ==
The third stage was played by the four second stage winners and the 12 Categoría Primera A clubs that did not qualify for international competition, which were seeded in the ties according to their placement in the 2019 season aggregate table. The two promoted clubs from the Categoría Primera B (Deportivo Pereira and Boyacá Chicó) were the last two seeded teams, with Deportivo Pereira taking the eleventh position and Boyacá Chicó the twelfth position. The four second stage winners as well as the best four teams according to the 2019 Primera A aggregate table hosted the second leg.

Team 1	Agg.	Team 2	1st leg	2nd leg
Boyacá Chicó (1)	2–3	Real San Andrés (2)	1–1	1–2
Deportivo Pereira (1)	2–1	Tigres (2)	1–0	1–1
Jaguares (1)	1–1 (3–4 p)	Deportes Quindío (2)	0–1	1–0
Rionegro Águilas (1)	4–1	Leones (2)	2–0	2–1
La Equidad (1)	3–5	Cúcuta Deportivo (1)	1–2	2–3
Atlético Bucaramanga (1)	2–4	Alianza Petrolera (1)	2–0	0–4
Envigado (1)	3–2	Once Caldas (1)	3–0	0–2
Patriotas (1)	3–4	Santa Fe (1)	1–3	2–1

=== First leg ===
21 October 2020	Jaguares	0–1	Deportes Quindío	Montería
15:00		Report	Figueroa 78' (pen.)	Stadium: Jaraguay; Attendance: 0 Referee: John Perdomo

21 October 2020	Deportivo Pereira	1–0	Tigres	Pereira
15:00	Molina 51' (pen.)	Report		Stadium: Hernán Ramírez Villegas; Attendance: 0 Referee: Ramiro Pabón

21 October 2020	La Equidad	1–2	Cúcuta Deportivo	Bogotá
18:00	Mier 50'	Report	Oliveros 6'; Vuletich 48'	Stadium: Metropolitano de Techo; Attendance: 0 Referee: Nolberto Ararat

21 October 2020	Envigado	3–0	Once Caldas	Envigado
20:00	Zapata 2'; López 53'; Guzmán 90+5' (pen.)	Report		Stadium: Polideportivo Sur; Attendance: 0 Referee: Ferney Trujillo

21 October 2020	Boyacá Chicó	1–1	Real San Andrés	Tunja
20:00	González 86' (pen.)	Report	Espinal 40'	Stadium: La Independencia; Attendance: 0 Referee: Steven Camargo

22 October 2020	Rionegro Águilas	2–0	Leones	Rionegro
18:00	Ramírez 30'; Otálvaro 53'	Report		Stadium: Alberto Grisales; Attendance: 0 Referee: Jorge Duarte

22 October 2020	Atlético Bucaramanga	2–0	Alianza Petrolera	Bucaramanga
18:00	Torres 45' (pen.); Aladesanmi 90+2' (pen.)	Report		Stadium: Alfonso López; Attendance: 0 Referee: Leonard Mosquera

22 October 2020	Patriotas	1–3	Santa Fe	Tunja
20:00	Ramírez 64'	Report	Cucchi 30'; Ballini 38'; Pedroza 57'	Stadium: La Independencia; Attendance: 0 Referee: Mauricio Mercado

=== Second leg ===
28 October 2020	Deportes Quindío	0–1 (1–1 agg.) (4–3 p)	Jaguares	Armenia
19:00		Report	Lemus 33'	Stadium: Centenario; Attendance: 0 Referee: Snaider Pontón

28 October 2020	Once Caldas	2–0 (2–3 agg.)	Envigado	Manizales
19:40	Rodríguez 22'; Carreazo 37'	Report		Stadium: Palogrande; Attendance: 0 Referee: Fernando Acuña

29 October 2020	Tigres	1–1 (1–2 agg.)	Deportivo Pereira	Bogotá
14:00	Vacca 78'	Report	De La Rosa 66'	Stadium: Metropolitano de Techo; Attendance: 0 Referee: José Ortiz

29 October 2020	Real San Andrés	2–1 (3–2 agg.)	Boyacá Chicó	San Andrés Island
15:00	Ramírez 18'; Molina 90'	Report	González 36' (pen.)	Stadium: Erwin O'Neil; Attendance: 0 Referee: Yahir Cárdenas

29 October 2020	Leones	1–2 (1–4 agg.)	Rionegro Águilas	Itagüí
15:00	Gómez 42'	Report	Fernández 57'; Ramírez 71'	Stadium: Municipal de Ditaires; Attendance: 0 Referee: Lisandro Castillo

29 October 2020	Santa Fe	1–2 (4–3 agg.)	Patriotas	Bogotá
15:30	Porras 45+1'	Report	Miranda 72' (pen.); Vanegas 90+5'	Stadium: El Campín; Attendance: 0 Referee: Diego Ruiz

29 October 2020	Cúcuta Deportivo	3–2 (5–3 agg.)	La Equidad	Armenia
17:45	Ariza 25'; Rojas 45+1'; Peralta 55'	Report	Cuero 47'; Sabbag 63'	Stadium: Centenario; Attendance: 0 Referee: Mauricio Pérez

29 October 2020	Alianza Petrolera	4–0 (4–2 agg.)	Atlético Bucaramanga	Barrancabermeja
20:10	Payares 29' (o.g.); Gil 45+1', 72', 87'	Report		Stadium: Daniel Villa Zapata; Attendance: 0 Referee: Nicolás Rodríguez

== Final stages ==
Each tie in the final stages was played in a single-legged format. In each tie, the team with the better overall record up to that stage hosted the match, except in the round of 16 where the third stage winners hosted it. The teams entering the competition at this stage were the ones that qualified for the 2020 Copa Libertadores and 2020 Copa Sudamericana, which were drawn into each of the eight ties. In case of a tie, extra time was not applied and the winner was decided in a penalty shoot-out.

=== Bracket ===
Round of 16
Deportes Quindío (p)	1 (5)
Deportivo Cali	1 (4)
Alianza Petrolera (p)	2 (4)
Millonarios	2 (3)
Deportivo Pereira	0
Independiente Medellín	2
Envigado	3 (3)
Junior (p)	3 (4)
Cúcuta Deportivo	0
Deportes Tolima (W.O.)	3
Rionegro Águilas	2 (4)
Atlético Nacional (p)	2 (5)
Real San Andrés	1 (2)
Deportivo Pasto (p)	1 (4)
Santa Fe	0 (3)
América de Cali (p)	0 (4)

Quarter-finals
Deportes Quindío	2
Alianza Petrolera	0
Independiente Medellín	2
Junior	1
Deportes Tolima	2
Atlético Nacional	0
Deportivo Pasto (p)	1 (3)
América de Cali	1 (1)

Semi-finals
Deportes Quindío	0
Independiente Medellín	1
Deportes Tolima (p)	1 (2)
Deportivo Pasto	1 (1)

Final
Independiente Medellín (p)	1 (5)
Deportes Tolima	1 (4)

=== Round of 16 ===
The third stage winners hosted the match.

18 November 2020	Deportes Quindío (2)	1–1 (5–4 p)	Deportivo Cali (1)	Armenia
15:00	Cambindo 19'	Report	Gómez 90'	Stadium: Centenario; Attendance: 0 Referee: Alexander Ortiz
	Penalties
	Carabalí (penalty scored); Serna (penalty scored); Garavito (penalty scored); Riquett (penalty scored); Cadavid (penalty scored)		(penalty scored) Valencia; (penalty scored) Gómez; (penalty scored) Velasco; (penalty scored) Moreno; (penalty missed) Lucumí

18 November 2020	Envigado (1)	3–3 (3–4 p)	Junior (1)	Envigado
15:30	Noreña 12'; Guzmán 45+3'; Muñoz 90+2'	Report	Rangel 8' (pen.); Angulo 62'; Vásquez 72'	Stadium: Polideportivo Sur; Attendance: 0 Referee: Fernando Acuña
	Penalties
	Moreno (penalty missed); Durán (penalty scored); Zapata (penalty scored); Báez (penalty missed); Guzmán (penalty scored)		(penalty scored) Cetré; (penalty scored) Vásquez; (penalty scored) Moreno; (penalty missed) Sandoval; (penalty scored) Viera

18 November 2020	Rionegro Águilas (1)	2–2 (4–5 p)	Atlético Nacional (1)	Rionegro
17:45	Puerta 32'; Obrian 72' (pen.)	Report	González 18'; Barrera 78'	Stadium: Alberto Grisales; Attendance: 0 Referee: Bismarks Santiago
	Penalties
	Obrian (penalty missed); Marrugo (penalty missed); Fernández (penalty scored); Martínez (penalty scored); Angulo (penalty scored); Ramírez (penalty scored); Escobar (penalty missed)		(penalty scored) Duque; (penalty scored) Barrera; (penalty missed) Hernández; (penalty scored) Candelo; (penalty missed) Andrade; (penalty scored) Rovira; (penalty scored) Segura

18 November 2020	Santa Fe (1)	0–0 (3–4 p)	América de Cali (1)	Bogotá
20:00		Report		Stadium: El Campín; Attendance: 0 Referee: Diego Escalante
	Penalties
	Velásquez (penalty missed); Torijano (penalty scored); Palacios (penalty scored); Gómez (penalty scored); Valdés (penalty missed); Herrera (penalty missed)		(penalty missed) Sierra; (penalty missed) Vergara; (penalty scored) Ureña; (penalty scored) Jaramillo; (penalty scored) Sánchez; (penalty scored) Moreno

19 November 2020	Deportivo Pereira (1)	0–2	Independiente Medellín (1)	Pereira
15:00		Report	Díaz 59'; Garcés 62'	Stadium: Hernán Ramírez Villegas; Attendance: 0 Referee: Ferney Trujillo

19 November 2020	Cúcuta Deportivo (1)	0–3; Awarded	Deportes Tolima (1)	Armenia
15:00		Report		Stadium: Centenario; Referee: Jonathan Ortiz
Note: Match awarded to Deportes Tolima by walkover since Cúcuta Deportivo entered liquidation and did not show up at the stadium.

19 November 2020	Alianza Petrolera (1)	2–2 (4–3 p)	Millonarios (1)	Barrancabermeja
19:40	Cuadros 6'; Arias 63' (pen.)	Report	Román 30'; Arango 54'	Stadium: Daniel Villa Zapata; Attendance: 0 Referee: Jorge Tabares
	Penalties
	Flórez (penalty missed); Hurtado (penalty scored); Portilla (penalty scored); Hinestroza (penalty scored); Zea (penalty scored)		(penalty scored) Salazar; (penalty missed) Arango; (penalty scored) Márquez; (penalty scored) De los Santos; (penalty missed) Quiñones

25 November 2020 (Note: The Real San Andrés v Deportivo Pasto match was originally scheduled for 18 November 2020, 15:00 local time, but was re-scheduled to 25 November 2020, 15:00 local time due to the impact of Hurricane Iota on the Archipelago of San Andrés, Providencia and Santa Catalina.)	Real San Andrés (2)	1–1 (2–4 p)	Deportivo Pasto (1)	San Andrés Island
15:00	Berrío 24'	Report	Álvarez 73'	Stadium: Erwin O'Neil; Attendance: 0 Referee: Wander Mosquera
	Penalties
	Ramírez (penalty scored); Molina (penalty missed); Duarte (penalty scored); Forbes (penalty missed)		(penalty scored) Mercado; (penalty scored) Rendón; (penalty scored) Rojano; (penalty missed) Campaña; (penalty scored) Álvarez

=== Quarter-finals ===
13 January 2021	Deportes Quindío (2)	2–0	Alianza Petrolera (1)	Armenia
17:30	Cambindo 45+1', 47'	Report		Stadium: Centenario; Attendance: 0 Referee: Ferney Trujillo

13 January 2021	Independiente Medellín (1)	2–1	Junior (1)	Medellín
20:00	Vuletich 52'; Castro 89'	Report	Borja 45'	Stadium: Atanasio Girardot; Attendance: 0 Referee: Carlos Ortega

14 January 2021	Deportivo Pasto (1)	1–1 (3–1 p)	América de Cali (1)	Pasto
19:45	Rodríguez 45+1'	Report	Moreno 36'	Stadium: Departamental Libertad; Attendance: 0 Referee: Diego Escalante
	Penalties
	Ayala (penalty scored); Herrera (penalty missed); Aponte (penalty scored); Hurtado (penalty scored)		(penalty scored) Carrascal; (penalty missed) Ureña; (penalty missed) Jaramillo; (penalty missed) Moreno

21 January 2021 (Note: The Deportes Tolima v Atlético Nacional match was originally scheduled for 14 January 2021, 20:00 local time at Estadio Centenario in Armenia, but was postponed since actions made by the local authorities of Armenia to contain the COVID-19 pandemic did not allow the match to take place, and Deportes Tolima's regular home stadium Estadio Manuel Murillo Toro in Ibagué was temporarily closed for remodeling works. It was rescheduled to 21 January 2021, 15:15 local time at Estadio Manuel Murillo Toro.)	Deportes Tolima (1)	2–0	Atlético Nacional (1)	Ibagué
15:15	Campaz 71'; Narváez 80'	Report		Stadium: Manuel Murillo Toro; Attendance: 0 Referee: Andrés Rojas

=== Semi-finals ===
27 January 2021	Deportes Quindío (2)	0–1	Independiente Medellín (1)	Armenia
19:40		Report	Mier 15'	Stadium: Centenario; Attendance: 0 Referee: Bismarks Santiago

28 January 2021	Deportes Tolima (1)	1–1 (2–1 p)	Deportivo Pasto (1)	Ibagué
15:15	Caicedo 55'	Report	Camargo 79'	Stadium: Manuel Murillo Toro; Attendance: 0 Referee: Carlos Betancur
	Penalties
	Mosquera (penalty missed); Nieto (penalty missed); Ortiz (penalty scored); Campaz (penalty scored)		(penalty missed) Ayala; (penalty missed) Gómez; (penalty scored) Aponte; (penalty missed) Vanegas; (penalty missed) Camargo

=== Final ===
For the final, the Ministry of Health of Colombia and the Municipality of Medellín authorized the entry of 30 people to watch the game, all of them belonging to Independiente Medellín's organized fan group.

11 February 2021
20:00

Independiente Medellín (1)	1–1	Deportes Tolima (1)
Mier 20'	Report	Angulo 90+1'
Penalties
Mier (penalty scored); Vuletich (penalty scored); Castro (penalty scored); Cadavid (penalty scored); Arboleda (penalty scored)	5–4	(penalty scored) Mosquera; (penalty scored) Cataño; (penalty missed) Ortiz; (penalty scored) Campaz; (penalty scored) Gordillo

Estadio Atanasio Girardot, Medellín
Attendance: 30
Referee: Alexander Ospina

== See also ==
- 2020 Categoría Primera A season
- 2020 Categoría Primera B season
