= 2024 Torneo DIMAYOR =

Football league season in Colombia

Torneo BetPlay Dimayor
- Season: 2024
- Dates: 2 February – 14 December 2024
- Champions: Unión Magdalena (2nd title)
- Promoted: Unión Magdalena; Llaneros
- Matches: 310
- Goals: 732 (2.36 per match)
- Top goalscorer: Torneo I: Juan Salcedo (10 goals); Torneo II: Néider Ospina and Jannenson Sarmiento (10 goals each)
- Biggest home win: Cúcuta Deportivo 6–0 Bogotá (16 March); Cúcuta Deportivo 6–0 Real Santander (5 October)
- Biggest away win: Atlético 0–4 Boca Juniors (6 May); Real Santander 0–4 Llaneros (16 October)
- Highest scoring: R. Cundinamarca 3–4 Llaneros (1 May); Boca Juniors 4–3 Real Santander (23 September)

The 2024 Categoría Primera B season (officially known as the 2024 Torneo BetPlay Dimayor season for sponsorship reasons) was the 35th season of the Categoría Primera B since its founding as Colombia's second division football league. The season began on 2 February and ended on 14 December 2024.

Unión Magdalena were the champions, winning their second Primera B title and promoting to Categoría Primera A after defeating Llaneros on penalties in the season's grand final following a 1–1 draw on aggregate. Llaneros also promoted at the end of the season, after ending the season as runners-up and also topping the season's aggregate table.

== Teams ==
16 teams took part in the season. The previous season's champions Patriotas and runners-up Fortaleza were promoted to Primera A for the 2024 season, being replaced in Primera B for this season by Unión Magdalena and Atlético Huila, who were relegated from Primera A at the end of the 2023 season after finishing in the bottom two places of the top tier's relegation table.

On 12 December 2023 the General Assembly of DIMAYOR approved a request from Cortuluá to change their home stadium for this season, moving to Palmira after one season in Yumbo, Valle del Cauca Department. On 10 January 2024, Cortuluá was rebranded as Internacional F.C. de Palmira. In addition to this, starting from this season Real Soacha Cundinamarca left Soacha and was rebranded to Real Cundinamarca, temporarily moving to Bogotá and playing its home matches at Parque Estadio Olaya Herrera.

Locations of the 2024 Categoría Primera B teams.

Club	City	Stadium	Capacity
Atlético	Cali	Pascual Guerrero	38,588
Atlético Huila	Neiva	Guillermo Plazas Alcid	12,000
Barranquilla	Barranquilla	Romelio Martínez	11,000
Boca Juniors de Cali	Cali	Pascual Guerrero	38,588
Bogotá	Bogotá	Metropolitano de Techo	10,000
Cúcuta Deportivo	Cúcuta	General Santander	42,901
Deportes Quindío	Armenia	Centenario	20,716
Inter Palmira	Palmira	Francisco Rivera Escobar	15,300
Itagüí Leones	Itagüí	Metropolitano Ciudad de Itagüí	12,000
Llaneros	Villavicencio	Bello Horizonte – Rey Pelé	15,000
Orsomarso	Palmira	Francisco Rivera Escobar	15,300
Real Cartagena	Cartagena	Jaime Morón León	16,068
Real Cundinamarca	Bogotá	Parque Estadio Olaya Herrera	2,500
Real Santander	Piedecuesta	Villa Concha	5,500
Tigres	Bogotá	Metropolitano de Techo	10,000
Unión Magdalena	Santa Marta	Sierra Nevada	16,000

== Torneo I ==
=== First stage ===
==== Standings ====
Pos	Team	Pld	W	D	L	GF	GA	GD	Pts	Qualification
1	Atlético Huila	16	13	0	3	25	9	+16	39	Advance to the semi-finals
2	Cúcuta Deportivo	16	9	5	2	25	14	+11	32	Advance to the semi-finals
3	Llaneros	16	8	5	3	28	15	+13	29	Advance to the semi-finals
4	Tigres	16	7	6	3	22	12	+10	27	Advance to the semi-finals
5	Unión Magdalena	16	7	6	3	25	17	+8	27	Advance to the semi-finals
6	Real Cartagena	16	7	5	4	22	15	+7	26	Advance to the semi-finals
7	Orsomarso	16	7	4	5	23	18	+5	25	Advance to the semi-finals
8	Deportes Quindío	16	5	7	4	20	18	+2	22 (Note: Away goals against: Deportes Quindío 10, Inter Palmira 11.)	Advance to the semi-finals
9	Inter Palmira	16	6	4	6	20	18	+2	22	
10	Boca Juniors de Cali	16	7	1	8	17	17	0	22	
11	Real Cundinamarca	16	5	4	7	28	28	0	19	
12	Barranquilla	16	4	6	6	19	18	+1	18	
13	Itagüí Leones	16	2	8	6	21	28	−7	14	
14	Bogotá	16	3	5	8	14	32	−18	14	
15	Real Santander	16	2	2	12	14	35	−21	8	
16	Atlético	16	1	2	13	5	34	−29	5	

Source: Dimayor, Soccerway
Rules for classification: 1) Points, 2) Goal difference, 3) Goals for, 4) Away goals for, 5) Away goals against, 6) Drawing of lots.

==== Results ====
Home \ Away	ATL	HUI	BAR	BOC	BOG	CUC	QUI	INT	LEO	LLA	ORS	RCA	RCU	RSA	TIG	MAG
Atlético	—	0–3	—	0–4	—	0–1	0–1	—	—	0–3	0–2	0–2	—	—	1–3	—
Atlético Huila	—	—	2–0	—	—	2–1	1–0	—	—	2–1	1–0	2–0	1–0	1–0	—	—
Barranquilla	4–0	—	—	—	—	—	1–0	0–0	2–2	—	—	0–1	1–1	1–0	2–2	—
Boca Juniors de Cali	0–1	0–2	1–0	—	1–2	—	2–1	—	1–0	—	—	—	—	—	2–0	0–0
Bogotá	2–2	2–1	1–0	—	—	—	2–2	—	2–2	1–2	—	—	—	—	0–1	0–2
Cúcuta Deportivo	—	—	2–1	1–0	6–0	—	—	1–0	1–1	—	—	—	3–2	2–1	—	1–1
Deportes Quindío	—	0–3 (Note: Match awarded 3–0 to Atlético Huila due to Deportes Quindío fielding the suspended player Ferney Angulo. The match had ended with Deportes Quindío winning 2–1.)	—	—	—	1–1	—	1–1	—	1–0	1–1	1–0	3–2	4–0	—	—
Inter Palmira	3–0	2–1	—	2–1	3–0	—	—	—	2–2	—	0–1	—	—	—	0–0	0–2
Itagüí Leones	2–0	1–2	—	—	—	—	2–2	—	—	0–3	1–1	0–0	—	—	2–3	1–3
Llaneros	—	—	2–1	2–0	—	0–0	—	1–2	—	—	1–0	0–0	3–3	4–0	—	—
Orsomarso	—	—	2–2	1–2	2–0	0–1	—	4–2	—	—	—	—	1–1	4–2	—	1–3
Real Cartagena	—	—	1–1	2–0	3–0	1–1	—	2–0	—	—	1–2	—	2–1	3–1	—	—
Real Cundinamarca	1–0	—	—	1–0	2–2	—	—	2–1	4–2	3–4	—	—	—	4–2	—	1–2
Real Santander	1–1	—	—	2–3	3–0	0–3	—	0–2	0–0	—	—	—	—	—	0–3	2–0
Tigres	—	0–1	—	—	0–0	4–0	0–0	—	—	1–1	0–1	4–2	1–0	—	—	—
Unión Magdalena	2–0	2–0	1–3	—	—	—	2–2	—	2–3	1–1	—	2–2	—	—	0–0	—

Source: Dimayor, Soccerway
Legend: Blue = home team win; Yellow = draw; Red = away team win.

=== Semi-finals ===
The eight teams that advanced to the semi-finals were drawn into two groups of four teams, with the top two teams from the first stage being seeded in each group. The two group winners advanced to the finals.

==== Group A ====
Pos	Team	Pld	W	D	L	GF	GA	GD	Pts	Qualification	ORS	RCA	HUI	TIG
1	Orsomarso	6	4	1	1	7	3	+4	13	Advance to the Finals	—	0–0	1–0	4–1
2	Real Cartagena	6	4	1	1	6	2	+4	13		2–0	—	2–0	1–0
3	Atlético Huila	6	3	0	3	7	4	+3	9		0–1	2–0	—	4–0
4	Tigres	6	0	0	6	1	12	−11	0		0–1	0–1	0–1	—

Source: Dimayor, Soccerway
Legend: Blue = home team win; Yellow = draw; Red = away team win.
Rules for classification: 1) Points, 2) First stage position (only applies for the seeded team, if it is involved in a tie), 3) Goal difference, 4) Goals for, 5) Away goals for, 6) Away goals against, 7) First stage position.

==== Group B ====
Pos	Team	Pld	W	D	L	GF	GA	GD	Pts	Qualification	LLA	MAG	CUC	QUI
1	Llaneros	6	3	2	1	10	6	+4	11	Advance to the Finals	—	1–1	2–1	2–0
2	Unión Magdalena	6	3	2	1	8	5	+3	11		2–1	—	2–0	0–0
3	Cúcuta Deportivo	6	2	0	4	5	9	−4	6		1–3	2–1	—	1–0
4	Deportes Quindío	6	1	2	3	3	6	−3	5		1–1	1–2	1–0	—

Source: Dimayor, Soccerway
Legend: Blue = home team win; Yellow = draw; Red = away team win.
Rules for classification: 1) Points, 2) First stage position (only applies for the seeded team, if it is involved in a tie), 3) Goal difference, 4) Goals for, 5) Away goals for, 6) Away goals against, 7) First stage position.

=== Finals ===
16 June 2024
15:30 UTC−5

Orsomarso	0–0	Llaneros
	Report

Estadio Francisco Rivera Escobar, Palmira
Referee: Carlos Ortega

19 June 2024
19:00 UTC−5

Llaneros	2–2	Orsomarso
Montes 76'; Muñoz 88'	Report	Ruiz 34'; Salcedo 71'
Penalties
Muñoz (penalty scored); Sierra (penalty scored); Urueña (penalty missed); Quejada (penalty scored); Verdugo (penalty scored)	4–3	(penalty scored) Salcedo; (penalty missed) Mosquera; (penalty missed) Mayo; (penalty scored) Agamez; (penalty scored) Escobar

Estadio Bello Horizonte – Rey Pelé, Villavicencio
Referee: Andrés Rojas

Tied 2–2 on aggregate, Llaneros won on penalties.

Torneo BetPlay DIMAYOR
2024–I winners

=== Top scorers ===
Rank	Player	Club	Goals
1	(Colombia) Juan Salcedo	Orsomarso	10
2	(Colombia) Andrés Carreño	Unión Magdalena	9
2	(Argentina) Lucas Farías	Atlético Huila	9
2	(Colombia) Alexis Serna	Deportes Quindío	9
5	(Colombia) Jonathan Agudelo	Cúcuta Deportivo	8
6	(Colombia) Miguel Murillo	Real Cartagena	7
7	(Colombia) Julián Angulo	Cúcuta Deportivo	6
7	(Colombia) Jhon Cabal	Real Cundinamarca	6
7	(Colombia) Robert Lara	Tigres	6
7	(Colombia) Arney Rocha	Real Cundinamarca	6
7	(Colombia) Kalazán Suárez	Inter Palmira	6
7	(Colombia) Cristian Vergara	Bogotá	6

Source: Soccerway

== Torneo II ==
=== First stage ===
==== Standings ====
Pos	Team	Pld	W	D	L	GF	GA	GD	Pts	Qualification
1	Unión Magdalena	16	10	4	2	26	13	+13	34	Advance to the semi-finals
2	Llaneros	16	10	3	3	27	11	+16	33	Advance to the semi-finals
3	Real Cartagena	16	10	2	4	24	9	+15	32	Advance to the semi-finals
4	Atlético Huila	16	9	1	6	19	14	+5	28	Advance to the semi-finals
5	Real Cundinamarca	16	7	4	5	17	13	+4	25	Advance to the semi-finals
6	Deportes Quindío	16	7	3	6	23	18	+5	24	Advance to the semi-finals
7	Orsomarso	16	7	3	6	12	15	−3	24	Advance to the semi-finals
8	Cúcuta Deportivo	16	7	2	7	22	16	+6	23	Advance to the semi-finals
9	Barranquilla	16	6	4	6	19	20	−1	22	
10	Inter Palmira	16	6	4	6	13	14	−1	22	
11	Itagüí Leones	16	4	6	6	18	21	−3	18	
12	Tigres	16	5	3	8	14	24	−10	18	
13	Boca Juniors de Cali	16	4	5	7	15	21	−6	17	
14	Bogotá	16	4	3	9	25	29	−4	15	
15	Atlético	16	3	4	9	13	24	−11	13	
16	Real Santander	16	3	1	12	9	34	−25	10	

Source: Dimayor, Soccerway
Rules for classification: 1) Points, 2) Goal difference, 3) Goals for, 4) Away goals for, 5) Away goals against, 6) Drawing of lots.

==== Results ====
Home \ Away	ATL	HUI	BAR	BOC	BOG	CUC	QUI	INT	LEO	LLA	ORS	RCA	RCU	RSA	TIG	MAG
Atlético	—	—	1–1	2–0	3–0	—	—	1–1	2–2	—	—	—	1–0	0–1	—	0–2
Atlético Huila	2–1	—	—	0–2	2–1	—	2–1	1–0	2–1	—	—	—	—	—	4–0	1–2
Barranquilla	—	1–2	—	1–1	4–2	1–0	—	—	—	3–2	1–0	0–1	—	—	—	1–1
Boca Juniors de Cali	2–0	—	—	—	—	0–1	—	1–2	—	0–0	0–0	1–4	0–2	4–3	—	—
Bogotá	—	—	—	0–1	—	5–0	—	1–2	—	—	2–3	0–1	2–2	1–0	3–2	—
Cúcuta Deportivo	2–0	1–2	—	—	—	—	3–1	—	—	0–1	0–1	2–1	—	6–0	3–0	—
Deportes Quindío	2–2	0–0	1–0	3–1	2–2	—	—	—	4–0	—	—	—	—	—	3–1	1–2
Inter Palmira	—	—	1–0	—	—	1–0	1–0	—	—	0–2	0–0	0–0	0–0	4–2	—	—
Itagüí Leones	—	—	1–2	2–2	1–1	1–0	—	2–0	—	—	—	—	1–0	2–0	—	1–1
Llaneros	3–0	1–0	—	—	2–3	—	0–1	—	1–0	—	—	—	2–1	—	2–0	1–1
Orsomarso	1–0	0–1	—	—	—	—	0–1	2–1	1–1	0–3 (Note: Match awarded 3–0 to Llaneros due to pitch invasion by an Orsomarso supporter. The match was ended due to lack of guarantees with a 1–1 score.)	—	1–0	—	—	1–0	—
Real Cartagena	3–0 (Note: Match suspended at halftime and awarded 3–0 to Real Cartagena since Atlético failed to present their physician for the match. The match was suspended with Real Cartagena leading 1–0.)	1–0	3–0	—	—	—	2–0	—	1–0	1–2	—	—	—	—	3–1	2–0
Real Cundinamarca	—	1–0	1–2	—	—	1–1	2–1	—	—	1–1	2–0	2–1	—	—	1–0	—
Real Santander	—	1–0	2–1	—	—	0–2	0–2	—	—	0–4	0–2	0–0	0–1	—	—	—
Tigres	2–0	—	1–1	0–0	1–0	—	—	1–0	2–2	—	—	—	—	1–0	—	2–1
Unión Magdalena	—	—	—	1–0	3–2	1–1	—	1–0	2–1	—	3–0	—	1–0	4–0	—	—

Source: Dimayor, Soccerway
Legend: Blue = home team win; Yellow = draw; Red = away team win.

=== Semi-finals ===
The eight teams that advanced to the semi-finals were drawn into two groups of four teams, with the top two teams from the first stage being seeded in each group. The two group winners advanced to the finals.

==== Group A ====
Pos	Team	Pld	W	D	L	GF	GA	GD	Pts	Qualification	MAG	CUC	RCU	HUI
1	Unión Magdalena	6	3	1	2	6	3	+3	10	Advance to the Finals	—	1–0	2–0	2–0
2	Cúcuta Deportivo	6	2	3	1	8	7	+1	9		2–1	—	1–0	1–1
3	Real Cundinamarca	6	2	2	2	3	4	−1	8		1–0	1–1	—	1–0
4	Atlético Huila	6	0	4	2	4	7	−3	4		0–0	3–3	0–0	—

Source: Dimayor, Soccerway
Legend: Blue = home team win; Yellow = draw; Red = away team win.
Rules for classification: 1) Points, 2) First stage position (only applies for the seeded team, if it is involved in a tie), 3) Goal difference, 4) Goals for, 5) Away goals for, 6) Away goals against, 7) First stage position.

==== Group B ====
Pos	Team	Pld	W	D	L	GF	GA	GD	Pts	Qualification	LLA	RCA	ORS	QUI
1	Llaneros	6	4	0	2	13	6	+7	12 (Note: Llaneros ahead of Real Cartagena for being the group's seeded team.)	Advance to the Finals	—	5–1	1–0	4–2
2	Real Cartagena	6	4	0	2	9	8	+1	12		1–0	—	2–1	3–0
3	Orsomarso	6	2	1	3	5	4	+1	7		2–0	0–1	—	0–0
4	Deportes Quindío	6	1	1	4	4	13	−9	4		0–3	2–1	0–2	—

Source: Dimayor, Soccerway
Legend: Blue = home team win; Yellow = draw; Red = away team win.
Rules for classification: 1) Points, 2) First stage position (only applies for the seeded team, if it is involved in a tie), 3) Goal difference, 4) Goals for, 5) Away goals for, 6) Away goals against, 7) First stage position.

=== Finals ===
28 November 2024
19:00 UTC−5

Unión Magdalena	4–0	Llaneros
Sarmiento 9' (pen.), 45+3' (pen.); Blanco 36'; Sención 69'	Report

Estadio Sierra Nevada, Santa Marta
Referee: Wilmar Roldán

3 December 2024
20:00 UTC−5

Llaneros	1–1	Unión Magdalena
Valencia 48'	Report	Aragón 41'

Estadio Bello Horizonte – Rey Pelé, Villavicencio
Referee: José Ortiz

Unión Magdalena won 5–1 on aggregate.

Torneo BetPlay DIMAYOR
2024–II winners

=== Top scorers ===
Rank	Player	Club	Goals
1	(Colombia) Néider Ospina	Llaneros	10
1	(Colombia) Jannenson Sarmiento	Unión Magdalena	10
3	(Colombia) Michell Ramos	Cúcuta Deportivo	9
4	(Colombia) Wilfrido de La Rosa	Real Cartagena	8
5	(Colombia) José Andrade	Boca Juniors de Cali	7
5	(Colombia) Cristian Vergara	Bogotá	7
7	(Colombia) Ruyery Blanco	Unión Magdalena	6
7	(Colombia) Juan Salcedo	Real Cartagena	6
7	(Argentina) Valentín Sánchez	Unión Magdalena	6
10	(Colombia) Juan Fernando Caicedo	Llaneros	5
10	(Colombia) Brayan Castro	Bogotá	5
10	(Colombia) Geovan Montes	Llaneros	5
10	(Colombia) Arney Rocha	Real Cundinamarca	5

Source: Soccerway

== Grand Final ==
10 December 2024
19:00 UTC−5

Unión Magdalena	1–0	Llaneros
Sarmiento 22' (pen.)	Report

Estadio Sierra Nevada, Santa Marta
Referee: Carlos Betancur

14 December 2024
19:30 UTC−5

Llaneros	1–0	Unión Magdalena
Duarte 39'	Report
Penalties
Ospina (penalty missed); Verdugo (penalty scored); Lasso (penalty missed); Valencia (penalty scored)	2–4	(penalty scored) Sarmiento; (penalty scored) Cantillo; (penalty scored) Blanco; (penalty scored) Sención

Estadio Bello Horizonte – Rey Pelé, Villavicencio
Referee: Wilmar Roldán

Tied 1–1 on aggregate, Unión Magdalena won on penalties.

Torneo BetPlay DIMAYOR
2024 champions

2nd title

== Aggregate table ==
Pos	Team	Pld	W	D	L	GF	GA	GD	Pts	Promotion or qualification
1	Llaneros (P)	50	26	13	11	82	46	+36	91	Promotion to Categoría Primera A
2	Unión Magdalena (C, P)	48	25	14	9	71	40	+31	89	Promotion to Categoría Primera A
3	Real Cartagena	44	25	8	11	61	34	+27	83	
4	Atlético Huila	44	25	5	14	55	34	+21	80	
5	Orsomarso	46	20	11	15	49	42	+7	71	
6	Cúcuta Deportivo	44	20	10	14	60	46	+14	70	
7	Deportes Quindío	44	14	13	17	50	55	−5	55	
8	Real Cundinamarca	38	14	10	14	48	45	+3	52	
9	Tigres	38	12	9	17	37	48	−11	45	
10	Inter Palmira	32	12	8	12	33	32	+1	44	
11	Barranquilla	32	10	10	12	38	38	0	40	
12	Boca Juniors de Cali	32	11	6	15	32	38	−6	39	
13	Itagüí Leones	32	6	14	12	39	49	−10	32	
14	Bogotá	32	7	8	17	39	61	−22	29	
15	Atlético	32	4	6	22	18	58	−40	18	
16	Real Santander	32	5	3	24	23	69	−46	18	

Source: Dimayor
Rules for classification: 1) Points, 2) Goal difference, 3) Goals for, 4) Away goals for, 5) Away goals against, 6) Drawing of lots.
(C) Champions; (P) Promoted

== Promotion play-off ==
Since the season runners-up Llaneros also ended up as the best-placed team in the aggregate table, they earned automatic promotion to Categoría Primera A and the promotion play-off was not played.

== See also ==
- 2024 Categoría Primera A season
- 2024 Copa Colombia
