= 2021 Torneo DIMAYOR =

Torneo BetPlay DIMAYOR
- Season: 2021
- Dates: 15 January 2021 – 10 March 2022
- Champions: Torneo I: Deportes Quindío (2nd title); Torneo II: Unión Magdalena (1st title)
- Promoted: Atlético Huila; Deportes Quindío; Cortuluá; Unión Magdalena
- Matches: 276
- Goals: 654 (2.37 per match)
- Top goalscorer: Torneo I: Steven Rodríguez (16 goals); Torneo II: Luis Felipe Gómez (12 goals)
- Biggest home win: Valledupar 6–0 Bogotá (15 February 2021)
- Biggest away win: Real Cartagena 0–5 Cortuluá (5 December 2021)
- Highest scoring: Valledupar 3–4 Orsomarso (23 January 2021); Llaneros 4–3 Leones (4 October 2021)

The 2021 Categoría Primera B season (officially known as the 2021 Torneo BetPlay DIMAYOR season for sponsorship reasons) was the 32nd season of the Categoría Primera B since its founding as Colombia's second division football league. The tournament started on 15 January 2021 and ended on 10 March 2022. Atlético Huila were the defending champions, having been unable to earn promotion to the Categoría Primera A despite winning the previous tournament.

Deportes Quindío won their second Primera B title in the Torneo I, defeating Cortuluá in the final over two legs, whilst Unión Magdalena were the champions in the Torneo II, beating Cortuluá in the final on penalties after a 1–1 draw to claim their first title.

== Format ==
The format for the 2021 Primera B season was decided at DIMAYOR's General Assembly session of 17 December 2020. For this season, two tournaments (Torneo I and Torneo II) with three stages each will be played. In the Torneo I, the 16 teams played a single round-robin tournament under the same fixture as the previous season, but with reversed home-and-away order. The top eight teams at the end of the fifteen rounds advanced to the semi-finals, where teams were split into two groups of four where they played each one of their rivals twice. The top team of each group advanced to the finals, where they played a double-legged series with the winner advancing to the Grand Final against the 2020 Primera B winners Atlético Huila. The Grand Final was also played over two legs, with the winner earning promotion to the Primera A for the 2021 Finalización tournament. The second promotion spot to the 2021 Primera A season would be decided in a promotion play-off between the Grand Final loser and the best team of the aggregate table of both the 2020 and 2021–I tournaments, other than the Grand Final winners.

The Torneo II was only played by 15 teams, given that two teams were promoted and only one team was relegated from the Primera A. In the first stage, the 15 teams played a single round-robin tournament with the top eight teams advancing to the semi-finals, in which the eight qualified teams were split into two groups of four teams each, playing a double round-robin tournament. Both group winners were promoted to the Primera A for the 2022 season and also played a single-match final to decide the champions.

== Teams ==
17 teams took part in the season, the 16 teams that competed in the previous season as well as Boyacá Chicó, who were relegated from the Primera A at the end of the 2021 Apertura tournament. Real San Andrés were rebranded back to Real Santander and returned to the Santander Department following the expiration of the agreement with the local authorities of the Archipelago of San Andrés, Providencia and Santa Catalina.

Locations of the 2021 Categoría Primera B teams

Club	City	Stadium	Capacity
Atlético	Cali	Pascual Guerrero	33,130
Atlético Huila	Neiva	Guillermo Plazas Alcid	22,000
Barranquilla	Barranquilla	Romelio Martínez	8,000
Boca Juniors de Cali	Palmira	Francisco Rivera Escobar	15,300
Bogotá	Bogotá	Metropolitano de Techo	8,000
Cortuluá	Tuluá	Doce de Octubre	16,000
Deportes Quindío	Armenia	Centenario	20,716
Fortaleza	Cota	Municipal de Cota	4,000
Leones	Itagüí	Metropolitano Ciudad de Itagüí	12,000
Llaneros	Villavicencio	Bello Horizonte	15,000
Orsomarso	Palmira	Francisco Rivera Escobar	15,300
Real Cartagena	Cartagena	Jaime Morón León	16,068
Real Santander	Piedecuesta	Villa Concha	3,000
Tigres	Bogotá	Metropolitano de Techo	8,000
Unión Magdalena	Santa Marta	Sierra Nevada	16,000
Valledupar	Valledupar	Armando Maestre Pavajeau	11,000

The following team was relegated from the Categoría Primera A at the end of the 2021 Apertura tournament and took part in the Torneo II:

Club	City	Stadium	Capacity
Boyacá Chicó	Tunja	La Independencia	20,630

== Torneo I ==
=== First stage ===
==== Standings ====
Pos	Team	Pld	W	D	L	GF	GA	GD	Pts	Qualification
1	Atlético Huila	15	8	6	1	27	13	+14	30	Advance to the semi-finals
2	Unión Magdalena	15	9	3	3	20	10	+10	30	Advance to the semi-finals
3	Deportes Quindío	15	6	7	2	16	11	+5	25	Advance to the semi-finals
4	Leones	15	7	4	4	19	15	+4	25	Advance to the semi-finals
5	Cortuluá	15	6	5	4	16	12	+4	23	Advance to the semi-finals
6	Valledupar	15	7	1	7	25	19	+6	22	Advance to the semi-finals
7	Fortaleza	15	6	4	5	25	22	+3	22	Advance to the semi-finals
8	Atlético	15	5	5	5	17	14	+3	20	Advance to the semi-finals
9	Real Cartagena	15	5	5	5	21	23	−2	20	
10	Orsomarso	15	4	7	4	23	24	−1	19	
11	Tigres	15	3	8	4	10	12	−2	17	
12	Llaneros	15	4	3	8	11	17	−6	15	
13	Boca Juniors de Cali	15	3	6	6	12	19	−7	15	
14	Bogotá	15	4	3	8	17	34	−17	15	
15	Barranquilla	15	3	4	8	9	17	−8	13	
16	Real Santander	15	2	5	8	14	20	−6	11	

Source: Dimayor, Soccerway
Rules for classification: 1) Points, 2) Goal difference, 3) Goals for, 4) Away goals for, 5) Away goals against, 6) Drawing of lots.

==== Results ====
Home \ Away	ATL	HUI	BAR	BOC	BOG	COR	QUI	FOR	LEO	LLA	ORS	RCA	RSA	TIG	MAG	VAL
Atlético	—	—	—	—	2–2	1–0	—	—	2–3	—	0–0	3–0	—	0–1	0–2	0–1
Atlético Huila	0–2	—	—	—	4–0	—	—	—	1–1	—	3–2	4–1	—	1–0	1–0	3–1
Barranquilla	0–1	0–0	—	0–1	—	—	0–0	1–2	—	1–0	—	—	1–0	1–0	—	—
Boca Juniors de Cali	1–1	2–2	—	—	—	—	—	1–4	—	—	0–0	—	—	—	0–1	1–2
Bogotá	—	—	1–0	2–1	—	2–3	1–1	—	1–3	2–1	—	—	1–4	—	—	—
Cortuluá	—	0–0	1–1	2–0	—	—	0–0	3–0	—	0–2	—	—	1–0	0–0	—	—
Deportes Quindío	1–0	0–0	—	1–1	—	—	—	2–1	—	—	—	—	—	—	1–0	1–2
Fortaleza	1–1	2–4	—	—	3–0	—	—	—	—	—	3–1	1–1	—	2–0	1–1	3–2
Leones	—	—	2–1	2–0	—	1–1	0–2	0–0	—	1–0	—	—	2–0	1–2	—	—
Llaneros	0–2	0–2	—	0–1	—	—	0–1	2–1	—	—	—	—	0–0	—	—	2–1
Orsomarso	—	—	2–2	—	4–2	1–2	2–1	—	1–1	0–0	—	3–3	—	—	—	—
Real Cartagena	—	—	1–0	1–1	1–1	2–1	2–3	—	2–1	3–1	—	—	—	—	—	—
Real Santander	2–2	2–2	—	0–1	—	—	1–1	3–1	—	—	1–2	0–3	—	—	0–1	0–1
Tigres	—	—	—	1–1	0–2	—	1–1	—	—	1–1	2–0	0–0	1–1	—	1–1	—
Unión Magdalena	—	—	4–1	—	1–0	1–0	—	—	2–0	1–2	1–1	2–1	—	—	—	—
Valledupar	—	—	2–0	—	6–0	1–2	—	—	0–1	—	3–4	2–0	—	0–0	1–2	—

Source: Dimayor, Soccerway
Legend: Blue = home team win; Yellow = draw; Red = away team win.

=== Semi-finals ===
The eight teams that advanced to the semi-finals were drawn into two groups of four teams, with the top two teams from the first stage being seeded in each group. The winners of each group advanced to the finals.

==== Group A ====
Pos	Team	Pld	W	D	L	GF	GA	GD	Pts	Qualification	COR	HUI	LEO	FOR
1	Cortuluá	6	3	2	1	13	8	+5	11	Advance to the Finals	—	3–1	3–0	0–1
2	Atlético Huila	6	2	2	2	8	7	+1	8		1–1	—	0–2	3–0
3	Leones	6	2	2	2	10	10	0	8		3–3	1–1	—	3–0
4	Fortaleza	6	2	0	4	6	12	−6	6		2–3	0–2	3–1	—

Source: Dimayor, Soccerway
Legend: Blue = home team win; Yellow = draw; Red = away team win.
Rules for classification: 1) Points, 2) Goal difference, 3) Goals for, 4) Away goals for, 5) Away goals against, 6) Yellow cards, 7) Red cards, 8) Drawing of lots.

==== Group B ====
Pos	Team	Pld	W	D	L	GF	GA	GD	Pts	Qualification	QUI	VAL	MAG	ATL
1	Deportes Quindío	6	5	1	0	8	2	+6	16	Advance to the Finals	—	2–1	2–0	1–0
2	Valledupar	6	3	1	2	7	4	+3	10		0–1	—	1–1	3–0
3	Unión Magdalena	6	1	3	2	8	7	+1	6		1–1	0–1	—	5–1
4	Atlético	6	0	1	5	2	12	−10	1		0–1	0–1	1–1	—

Source: Dimayor, Soccerway
Legend: Blue = home team win; Yellow = draw; Red = away team win.
Rules for classification: 1) Points, 2) Goal difference, 3) Goals for, 4) Away goals for, 5) Away goals against, 6) Yellow cards, 7) Red cards, 8) Drawing of lots.

=== Finals ===
21 June 2021
16:00

Cortuluá	0–1	Deportes Quindío
	Report	Filigrana 33'

Estadio Doce de Octubre, Tuluá
Attendance: 0
Referee: Bismarks Santiago

24 June 2021
15:30

Deportes Quindío	1–0	Cortuluá
Mina 30'	Report

Estadio Centenario, Armenia
Attendance: 0
Referee: John Hinestroza

Deportes Quindío won 2–0 on aggregate.

Torneo BetPlay DIMAYOR
2021–I champions

2nd title

=== Top scorers ===
Rank	Name	Club	Goals
1	(Colombia) Steven Rodríguez	Leones	16
2	(Colombia) Feiver Mercado	Cortuluá	11
3	(Colombia) Adrián Parra	Fortaleza	10
4	(Colombia) Ruyery Blanco	Unión Magdalena	9
5	(Colombia) Mario Álvarez	Real Cartagena	8
6	(Colombia) Yuber Asprilla	Atlético Huila	7
6	(Colombia) Luis Becerra	Orsomarso	7
6	(Colombia) Breidy Golúz	Orsomarso	7
6	(Colombia) Gianfranco Peña	Valledupar	7
10	(Colombia) Luis Felipe Gómez	Leones	6
10	(Colombia) Yeison Mena	Atlético	6

Source: Soccerway

== Grand Final ==
The Torneo I winners Deportes Quindío played a double-legged series against the 2020 Primera B champions Atlético Huila for the first promotion berth to the Categoría Primera A for the remainder of the 2021 season. The losing team qualified for the promotion play-off.

27 June 2021
18:30

Atlético Huila	1–1	Deportes Quindío
Becerra 68'	Report	Mina 25'

Estadio Guillermo Plazas Alcid, Neiva
Attendance: 0
Referee: Bismarks Santiago

30 June 2021
19:30

Deportes Quindío	0–2	Atlético Huila
	Report	Rivera 44' (pen.); Moreno 69'

Estadio Centenario, Armenia
Attendance: 0
Referee: Carlos Ortega

Atlético Huila won 3–1 on aggregate and were promoted to Categoría Primera A.

== 2020 and 2021–I aggregate table ==
Pos	Team	Pld	W	D	L	GF	GA	GD	Pts	Qualification
1	Deportes Quindío (P)	48	24	17	7	61	32	+29	89	Promotion to 2021 Categoría Primera A
2	Atlético Huila (P)	48	25	14	9	69	45	+24	89	Promotion to 2021 Categoría Primera A
3	Cortuluá	48	23	11	14	72	48	+24	80	
4	Unión Magdalena	44	21	12	11	65	43	+22	75	
5	Valledupar	44	20	11	13	51	42	+9	71	
6	Leones	44	16	15	13	60	49	+11	63	
7	Fortaleza	38	14	10	14	54	55	−1	52	
8	Bogotá	38	15	7	16	52	64	−12	52	
9	Llaneros	38	11	12	15	34	39	−5	45	
10	Orsomarso	32	8	15	9	40	46	−6	39	
11	Boca Juniors de Cali	32	8	10	14	27	40	−13	34	
12	Atlético	38	8	10	20	31	53	−22	34	
13	Real Cartagena	32	8	8	16	29	45	−16	32	
14	Real Santander	32	8	7	17	33	44	−11	31	
15	Tigres	32	5	14	13	22	32	−10	29	
16	Barranquilla	32	5	9	18	18	41	−23	24	

Source: Dimayor
Rules for classification: 1) Points, 2) Goal difference, 3) Goals for, 4) Away goals for, 5) Away goals against, 6) Drawing of lots.
(P) Promoted

== Promotion play-off ==
Since the Grand Final losers Deportes Quindío also ended up as the best team in the 2020 and 2021–I aggregate table, they earned automatic promotion to the Categoría Primera A and the promotion play-off was not played.

== Torneo II ==
=== First stage ===
==== Standings ====
Pos	Team	Pld	W	D	L	GF	GA	GD	Pts	Qualification
1	Leones	14	9	2	3	25	12	+13	29	Advanced to the semi-finals
2	Bogotá	14	8	4	2	18	9	+9	28	Advanced to the semi-finals
3	Boyacá Chicó	14	8	4	2	15	6	+9	28	Advanced to the semi-finals
4	Fortaleza	14	7	5	2	24	10	+14	26	Advanced to the semi-finals
5	Unión Magdalena	14	7	4	3	24	17	+7	25	Advanced to the semi-finals
6	Cortuluá	14	7	4	3	19	13	+6	25	Advanced to the semi-finals
7	Llaneros	14	6	5	3	20	15	+5	23	Advanced to the semi-finals
8	Real Cartagena	14	5	5	4	17	14	+3	20	Advanced to the semi-finals
9	Atlético	14	5	4	5	17	20	−3	19	
10	Barranquilla	14	3	6	5	13	19	−6	15	
11	Orsomarso	14	4	3	7	14	22	−8	15	
12	Real Santander	14	1	7	6	15	24	−9	10	
13	Valledupar	14	1	5	8	13	23	−10	8	
14	Boca Juniors de Cali	14	2	1	11	8	25	−17	7	
15	Tigres	14	1	3	10	6	19	−13	6	

Source: Dimayor, Soccerway
Rules for classification: 1) Points, 2) Goal difference, 3) Goals for, 4) Away goals for, 5) Away goals against, 6) Drawing of lots.

==== Results ====
Home \ Away	ATL	BAR	BOC	BOG	BOY	COR	FOR	LEO	LLA	ORS	RCA	RSA	TIG	MAG	VAL
Atlético	—	—	2–1	0–1	—	0–2	0–3	1–3	—	—	—	—	2–1	—	3–2
Barranquilla	1–1	—	1–0	—	—	2–2	0–0	0–1	—	—	—	—	2–0	—	2–1
Boca Juniors de Cali	—	—	—	1–2	0–1	—	—	1–5	—	2–1	—	0–0	1–0	0–2	—
Bogotá	—	2–0	—	—	2–1	—	—	—	2–1	3–0	0–0	1–1	—	3–1	—
Boyacá Chicó	1–0	1–1	—	—	—	—	—	—	0–0	—	1–0	3–1	—	1–0	2–0
Cortuluá	—	—	3–1	0–0	0–2	—	—	1–0	—	1–1	—	2–0	3–0	—	—
Fortaleza	—	—	3–0	3–0	0–0	1–2	—	3–1	—	4–0	—	—	2–1	—	—
Leones	—	—	—	1–0	0–0	—	—	—	—	1–0	2–0	2–1	2–0	3–0	—
Llaneros	0–0	4–2	1–0	—	—	1–1	1–1	4–3	—	—	—	—	—	—	1–0
Orsomarso	1–2	0–0	—	—	2–1	—	—	—	0–2	—	1–1	3–1	—	1–2	—
Real Cartagena	1–1	3–1	2–0	—	—	2–0	0–1	—	2–1	—	—	—	—	—	2–2
Real Santander	0–2	1–1	—	—	—	—	1–1	—	3–1	—	2–2	—	—	3–3	1–1
Tigres	—	—	—	0–0	0–1	—	—	—	0–2	1–2	1–2	2–0	—	0–0	—
Unión Magdalena	3–3	3–0	—	—	—	2–0	3–1	—	1–1	—	1–0	—	—	—	3–1
Valledupar	—	—	2–1	0–2	—	1–2	1–1	1–1	—	1–2	—	—	0–0	—	—

Source: Dimayor, Soccerway
Legend: Blue = home team win; Yellow = draw; Red = away team win.

=== Semi-finals ===
The eight teams that advanced to the semi-finals were drawn into two groups of four teams, with the top two teams from the first stage being seeded in each group. The winners of each group advanced to the final and were also promoted to Categoría Primera A for 2022.

==== Group A ====
Pos	Team	Pld	W	D	L	GF	GA	GD	Pts	Qualification	COR	BOY	LEO	RCA
1	Cortuluá (P)	6	4	1	1	11	2	+9	13	Advance to the Final and promotion to 2022 Categoría Primera A	—	1–0	2–0	3–1
2	Boyacá Chicó	6	2	3	1	6	2	+4	9		1–0	—	1–1	4–0
3	Leones	6	1	4	1	7	8	−1	7		0–0	0–0	—	3–2
4	Real Cartagena	6	0	2	4	6	18	−12	2		0–5	0–0	3–3	—

Source: Dimayor
Legend: Blue = home team win; Yellow = draw; Red = away team win.
Rules for classification: 1) Points, 2) Goal difference, 3) Goals for, 4) Away goals for, 5) Away goals against, 6) Yellow cards, 7) Red cards, 8) Drawing of lots.
(P) Promoted

==== Group B ====
Pos	Team	Pld	W	D	L	GF	GA	GD	Pts	Qualification	MAG	FOR	LLA	BOG
1	Unión Magdalena (P)	6	3	2	1	8	4	+4	11	Advance to the Final and promotion to 2022 Categoría Primera A	—	1–0	0–0	4–1
2	Fortaleza	6	3	1	2	9	5	+4	10		0–0	—	3–1	1–2
3	Llaneros	6	2	1	3	7	7	0	7		1–2	0–1	—	2–0
4	Bogotá	6	2	0	4	7	15	−8	6		2–1	1–4	1–3	—

Source: Dimayor
Legend: Blue = home team win; Yellow = draw; Red = away team win.
Rules for classification: 1) Points, 2) Goal difference, 3) Goals for, 4) Away goals for, 5) Away goals against, 6) Yellow cards, 7) Red cards, 8) Drawing of lots.
(P) Promoted

=== Final ===
10 March 2022
15:30 UTC−5

Cortuluá	1–1	Unión Magdalena
K. Valencia 7'	Report	González 42'
Penalties
Mercado (penalty missed); Ruiz (penalty missed); Colorado (penalty missed)	0–3	(penalty scored) Scott; (penalty scored) Vacca; (penalty scored) Sánchez

Estadio Doce de Octubre, Tuluá
Referee: Yahir Cárdenas

Torneo BetPlay DIMAYOR
2021–II champions

1st title

=== Top scorers ===
Rank	Name	Club	Goals
1	(Colombia) Luis Felipe Gómez	Leones	12
2	(Colombia) Diego Echeverri	Llaneros	11
3	(Colombia) Carlos Lucumí	Fortaleza	10
3	(Colombia) Jefferson Rivas	Leones	10
5	(Colombia) Ethan González	Unión Magdalena	8
6	(Colombia) Isaac Camargo	Unión Magdalena	7
6	(Colombia) Iván Rivas	Boyacá Chicó	7
6	(Colombia) Luis Sandoval	Fortaleza	7
9	(Colombia) Guillermo Murillo	Cortuluá	6
9	(Colombia) Franklin Navarro	Real Cartagena	6
9	(Argentina) Franco Pedraza	Bogotá	6

Source: Soccerway

=== Llaneros v Unión Magdalena controversy ===
On 4 December 2021, the last matchday of the Torneo II semi-final Group B, Unión Magdalena sealed their promotion to Categoría Primera A after coming back from a 1–0 deficit against Llaneros in Villavicencio with a couple of goals in quick succession in stoppage time to win the game by a 2–1 score and get promoted at the expense of Fortaleza, who were clinching promotion with the score in Villavicencio despite losing their final match to Bogotá at the same time. However, video footage of Unión Magdalena's winning goal appeared to show the Llaneros players backing off and failing to make an effort to prevent their rivals from scoring. The events sparked outrage both within the country and abroad, with Colombian internationals Juan Cuadrado and Mateus Uribe expressing their displeasure, calling them "a lack of respect" and "an embarrassment for Colombian football", whilst President of Colombia Iván Duque Márquez stated it was a "national disgrace".

In response to the growing backlash, as well as calls from Fortaleza to get the match annulled and Unión Magdalena's promotion reversed, DIMAYOR chairman Fernando Jaramillo ordered the opening of an inquiry on the match events while also requesting the Office of the Attorney General of Colombia to investigate whether any criminal offenses had been committed, but on 7 December 2021, Jaramillo stated that the tournament would not be paused and Unión Magdalena's promotion would not be overturned while due process was completed. However, amid the ongoing inquiries, the Torneo II's final match between Cortuluá and Unión Magdalena, which was originally scheduled to be played on 11 December 2021 at Cortuluá's home stadium Estadio Doce de Octubre was postponed until further notice.

On 30 December 2021 DIMAYOR's Disciplinary Commission closed the investigation on Unión Magdalena as it found no evidence implying that members of the aforementioned club had been responsible for the events that occurred in the match against Llaneros, thus confirming their promotion to Primera A. However, sources within the governing body of Colombian professional football stated that the investigation on Llaneros would remain open. Five months later, it was announced that four Llaneros players who were involved in that match had been fined and suspended from all sporting and administrative activities for "committing acts against sporting dignity and decorum".

== See also ==
- 2021 Categoría Primera A season
- 2021 Copa Colombia
