= 2020 Torneo DIMAYOR =

Torneo BetPlay Dimayor
- Season: 2020
- Dates: 31 January – 26 December 2020
- Champions: Atlético Huila (3rd title)
- Promoted: None
- Matches: 162
- Goals: 368 (2.27 per match)
- Top goalscorer: Diber Cambindo (12 goals)
- Biggest home win: Cortuluá 6–0 Atlético (19 September)
- Biggest away win: Bogotá 0–4 Atlético Huila (12 February)
- Highest scoring: Barranquilla 2–5 U. Magdalena (23 October)

The 2020 Categoría Primera B season (officially known as the 2020 Torneo BetPlay Dimayor season for sponsorship reasons) was the 31st season of the Categoría Primera B since its founding as Colombia's second division football league. The tournament started on 31 January and ended on 26 December 2020, with Atlético Huila winning their third title in the competition after defeating Cortuluá in the finals.

The competition was suspended from 13 March to 17 September due to the COVID-19 pandemic.

== Format ==
For this season, and prior to the COVID-19 pandemic, the format was originally planned to be the same as the previous season: two tournaments (Torneo I and Torneo II) with three stages each. In the first stage of both tournaments, the 16 clubs would play each other once, for a total of 15 games. The top eight teams after the first stage would advance to the semifinal round where they would be sorted into two groups of four to play a double round-robin tournament group stage, with the top team of each group qualifying for the finals. The winners of both tournaments would play a final series on a home-and-away basis, with the winner being crowned as season champions and also earning promotion to the Categoría Primera A for the 2021 season. The season runners-up would then play the best team in the aggregate table (other than the champions) in another double-legged series for the second promotion berth. In case the season runner-up also ended up as the best team in the aggregate table, it would also be promoted and the promotion play-off would not be played.

On 25 July 2020, DIMAYOR's General Assembly decided to continue playing the Torneo I as the only tournament to be held in the season, with the winners of that tournament being crowned as champions and earning automatic promotion to the top flight. The promotion play-off, if needed, would still be played by the runners-up and the best team in the aggregate table other than the champions. On 13 August 2020, DIMAYOR decided that there would not be any teams relegated from Primera A at the end of the season, meaning that this tournament would not award its champion a berth into the next year's Primera A tournament and that the promotion play-off would also be cancelled.

== Teams ==
16 teams took part, fourteen of them returning from last season plus Unión Magdalena and Atlético Huila, who were relegated from the Primera A the previous season. Both teams replaced Deportivo Pereira and Boyacá Chicó who earned promotion at the end of the last season.

Locations of the 2020 Categoría Primera B teams

Club	Home city	Stadium	Capacity
Atlético	Cali	Pascual Guerrero	33,130
Atlético Huila	Neiva	Guillermo Plazas Alcid	22,000
Barranquilla	Barranquilla	Romelio Martínez	20,000
Boca Juniors de Cali	Cali	Pascual Guerrero	33,130
Bogotá	Bogotá	Metropolitano de Techo	8,000
Cortuluá	Tuluá	Doce de Octubre	16,000
Deportes Quindío	Armenia	Centenario	20,716
Fortaleza	Cota	Municipal de Cota	4,000
Leones	Itagüí; Envigado	Metropolitano Ciudad de Itagüí; Polideportivo Sur (Note: Used by Leones as temporary home stadium while Estadio Metropolitano Ciudad de Itagüí was remodeled.)	12,000; 14,000
Llaneros	Villavicencio; Tunja	Manuel Calle Lombana; La Independencia (Note: Used by Llaneros as temporary home stadium while Estadio Manuel Calle Lombana is remodeled.)	15,000; 20,630
Orsomarso	Palmira; Tuluá	Francisco Rivera Escobar; Deportivo Cali (Note: Used by Orsomarso for their Torneo I home matches against Valledupar and Unión Magdalena.); Doce de Octubre (Note: Used by Orsomarso for their Torneo I home matches against Tigres and Boca Juniors de Cali.)	15,300; 42,000; 16,000
Real Cartagena	Cartagena; Magangué	Jaime Morón León; Diego de Carvajal (Note: Used by Real Cartagena as temporary home stadium while Estadio Jaime Morón León is cleared for use.)	16,068; 10,000
Real San Andrés	San Andrés	Erwin O'Neill	5,000
Tigres	Bogotá	Metropolitano de Techo	8,000
Unión Magdalena	Santa Marta	Sierra Nevada	16,000
Valledupar	Valledupar	Armando Maestre Pavajeau	11,000

== Effects of the COVID-19 pandemic ==
On 13 March 2020, after a meeting with its member clubs, DIMAYOR announced the temporary suspension of the tournament, along with the Primera A and Copa Colombia ones, due to the COVID-19 pandemic.

On 29 June, and after an Assembly of its member clubs, DIMAYOR presented a timetable for the implementation of the biosecurity protocol to resume its competitions, with COVID-19 testing for players and staff members of every club scheduled to be held from 10 to 15 July, and individual training resuming the following day. The resumption of collective training sessions, scheduled for 20 August, would be subject to government approval. According to said timetable, the league was scheduled to resume on 27 August, pending the fulfillment of the previous stages as well as final approval by the Colombian government. On 25 July, it was announced that the competition would resume on 30 August with alterations in its format, and pending government approval. With the Ministry of Health authorizing stages 4 and 5 of the biosecurity protocol (collective trainings and competition, respectively) on 20 August, and due to some adjustments to the protocol requested by DIMAYOR, that date of resumption had to be pushed back for at least two weeks, to mid-September.

On 31 August, the Ministry of Health issued the resolution that approved the adjusted protocol and greenlit the start of collective training sessions for 1 September, while President of DIMAYOR Fernando Jaramillo confirmed that the tournament would resume on 19 September. On 3 September, DIMAYOR notified its associate clubs that the eighth round of the competition would be played in the weekend of 19–20 September, with a meeting to confirm the competition format to be held on 9 September.

== First stage ==
=== Standings ===
Pos	Team	Pld	W	D	L	GF	GA	GD	Pts	Qualification
1	Cortuluá	17	10	3	4	27	14	+13	33	Advance to the semifinals
2	Unión Magdalena	17	9	5	3	28	17	+11	32	Advance to the semifinals
3	Deportes Quindío	17	8	6	3	28	13	+15	30	Advance to the semifinals
4	Bogotá	17	9	3	5	26	20	+6	30	Advance to the semifinals
5	Valledupar	17	8	6	3	16	13	+3	30	Advance to the semifinals
6	Llaneros	17	7	7	3	22	15	+7	28	Advance to the semifinals
7	Atlético Huila	17	8	4	5	20	19	+1	28	Advance to the semifinals
8	Leones	17	7	6	4	26	16	+10	27	Advance to the semifinals
9	Fortaleza	17	6	6	5	23	21	+2	24	
10	Real San Andrés	17	6	2	9	19	24	−5	20	
11	Orsomarso	17	4	8	5	17	22	−5	20	
12	Boca Juniors de Cali	17	5	4	8	15	21	−6	19	
13	Atlético	17	3	4	10	12	27	−15	13	
14	Tigres	17	2	6	9	12	20	−8	12	
15	Real Cartagena	17	3	3	11	8	22	−14	12	
16	Barranquilla	17	2	5	10	9	24	−15	11	

Source: Dimayor, Soccerway
Rules for classification: 1) Points, 2) Goal difference, 3) Goals for, 4) Away goals for, 5) Away goals against, 6) Drawing of lots

=== Results ===
==== Matchdays 1–15 ====
Home \ Away	ATL	HUI	BAR	BOC	BOG	COR	QUI	FOR	LEO	LLA	ORS	RCA	RSA	TIG	MAG	VAL
Atlético	—	1–2	0–1	1–0	—	—	0–0	0–0	—	1–1	—	—	0–3	—	—	—
Atlético Huila	—	—	2–1	3–1	—	1–0	2–1	1–1	—	0–2	—	—	1–1	—	—	—
Barranquilla	—	—	—	—	0–1	0–1	—	—	2–3	—	0–0	0–0	—	—	2–5	0–0
Boca Juniors de Cali	—	—	1–2	—	1–3	0–1	1–3	—	0–0	1–1	—	0–0	1–0	1–0	—	—
Bogotá	1–2	0–4	—	—	—	—	—	1–1	—	—	3–0	1–0	—	1–3	2–1	3–0
Cortuluá	6–0	—	—	—	2–0	—	—	—	3–3	—	2–1	2–0	—	—	1–2	1–2
Deportes Quindío	—	—	4–0	—	2–2	1–2	—	—	1–0	3–0	2–2	5–1	1–0	2–0	—	—
Fortaleza	—	—	1–0	1–0	—	2–3	1–0	—	2–2	1–1	—	—	3–1	—	—	—
Leones	1–0	4–0	—	—	0–0	—	—	—	—	—	2–0	1–0	—	—	1–1	1–2
Llaneros	—	—	2–0	—	0–2	0–0	—	—	1–1	—	1–1	2–0	—	2–1	4–0	—
Orsomarso	2–1	0–0	—	1–3	—	—	—	3–2	—	—	—	—	2–1	1–1	2–2	0–0
Real Cartagena	2–1	1–0	—	—	—	—	—	2–1	—	—	0–1	—	2–3	0–0	0–2	0–1
Real San Andrés	—	—	2–0	—	2–1	2–1	—	—	0–3	0–1	—	—	—	2–0	—	—
Tigres	1–2	0–0	0–0	—	—	0–0	—	1–2	1–3	—	—	—	—	—	—	1–1
Unión Magdalena	1–1	2–0	—	2–0	—	—	1–1	2–1	—	—	—	—	5–1	1–0	—	0–1
Valledupar	1–0	1–2	—	2–2	—	—	0–0	0–1	—	1–0	—	—	2–1	—	—	—

Source: Dimayor, Soccerway
Legend: Blue = home team win; Yellow = draw; Red = away team win.

==== Matchdays 16–17 ====
Upon the conclusion of the first fifteen matchdays of the first stage, teams played two additional games in double-legged ties, with the teams ranked from first to eighth place after the fifteenth round being seeded and paired against a rival ranked in the bottom half of the table at that point, which were decided by a draw held on 2 November 2020. The seeded teams played at home on Matchday 17.

Team 1	Agg.	Team 2	1st leg	2nd leg
Real San Andrés	1	Unión Magdalena	0–0	0–1
Boca Juniors de Cali	2	Leones	1–0	2–1
Real Cartagena	3	Cortuluá	0–1	0–1
Orsomarso	4	Deportes Quindío	1–1	0–1
Barranquilla	5	Valledupar	0–0	1–2
Tigres	6	Atlético Huila	2–0	1–2
Fortaleza	7	Llaneros	2–3	1–1
Atlético	8	Bogotá	0–1	2–4

== Semifinals ==
The eight teams that advanced to the semifinals were drawn into two groups of four teams. The winners of each group advanced to the finals.

=== Group A ===
Pos	Team	Pld	W	D	L	GF	GA	GD	Pts	Qualification	COR	VAL	BOG	LEO
1	Cortuluá	6	4	1	1	15	8	+7	13	Advance to the Finals	—	5–0	3–2	2–1
2	Valledupar	6	2	3	1	3	6	−3	9		0–0	—	1–0	0–0
3	Bogotá	6	2	1	3	9	10	−1	7		3–2	1–2	—	2–2
4	Leones	6	0	3	3	5	8	−3	3		2–3	0–0	0–1	—

Source: Dimayor
Legend: Blue = home team win; Yellow = draw; Red = away team win.
Rules for classification: 1) Points, 2) Goal difference, 3) Goals for, 4) Away goals for, 5) Away goals against, 6) Yellow cards, 7) Red cards, 8) Drawing of lots.

=== Group B ===
Pos	Team	Pld	W	D	L	GF	GA	GD	Pts	Qualification	HUI	QUI	MAG	LLA
1	Atlético Huila	6	4	1	1	7	4	+3	13	Advance to the Finals	—	1–0	2–1	0–0
2	Deportes Quindío	6	3	2	1	6	3	+3	11		1–0	—	2–2	2–0
3	Unión Magdalena	6	2	1	3	9	9	0	7		2–3	0–1	—	2–0
4	Llaneros	6	0	2	4	1	7	−6	2		0–1	0–0	1–2	—

Source: Dimayor
Legend: Blue = home team win; Yellow = draw; Red = away team win.
Rules for classification: 1) Points, 2) Goal difference, 3) Goals for, 4) Away goals for, 5) Away goals against, 6) Yellow cards, 7) Red cards, 8) Drawing of lots.

== Finals ==
23 December 2020
20:00

Atlético Huila	1–0	Cortuluá
Moreno 59'	Report

Estadio Guillermo Plazas Alcid, Neiva
Attendance: 0
Referee: Yahir Cárdenas
26 December 2020
15:30

Cortuluá	1–3	Atlético Huila
Amaya 51'	Report	Moreno 30'; Asprilla 38'; Otálvaro 87'

Estadio Doce de Octubre, Tuluá
Attendance: 0
Referee: Héctor Rivera

Atlético Huila won 4–1 on aggregate.

Torneo Betplay Dimayor
2020 champions

3rd title

== Top goalscorers ==
Rank	Name	Club	Goals
1	(Colombia) Diber Cambindo	Deportes Quindío	12
2	(Colombia) Ruyery Blanco	Unión Magdalena	11
2	(Colombia) Eder Munive	Leones	11
4	(Colombia) Sebastián Acosta	Fortaleza	9
4	(Colombia) Omar Vásquez	Llaneros	9
6	(Colombia) César Caicedo	Bogotá	8
7	(Colombia) Arlex Hurtado	Bogotá	7
8	(Colombia) Luis Mina	Boca Juniors de Cali	6
8	(Colombia) Brayan Moreno	Atlético Huila	6
8	(Colombia) Luis Narváez	Unión Magdalena	6
8	(Colombia) Harold Rivera	Atlético Huila	6

Source: Soccerway

== Aggregate table ==
Pos	Team	Pld	W	D	L	GF	GA	GD	Pts	Qualification
1	Atlético Huila (C)	25	14	5	6	31	24	+7	47	Qualification for 2021 Grand Final
2	Cortuluá	25	14	4	7	43	26	+17	46	
3	Deportes Quindío	23	11	8	4	34	16	+18	41	
4	Unión Magdalena	23	11	6	6	37	26	+11	39	
5	Valledupar	23	10	9	4	19	19	0	39	
6	Bogotá	23	11	4	8	35	30	+5	37	
7	Leones	23	7	9	7	31	24	+7	30	
8	Llaneros	23	7	9	7	23	22	+1	30	
9	Fortaleza	17	6	6	5	23	21	+2	24	
10	Real San Andrés	17	6	2	9	19	24	−5	20	
11	Orsomarso	17	4	8	5	17	22	−5	20	
12	Boca Juniors de Cali	17	5	4	8	15	21	−6	19	
13	Atlético	17	3	4	10	12	27	−15	13	
14	Tigres	17	2	6	9	12	20	−8	12	
15	Real Cartagena	17	3	3	11	8	22	−14	12	
16	Barranquilla	17	2	5	10	9	24	−15	11	

Source: Dimayor
Rules for classification: 1) Points, 2) Goal difference, 3) Goals for, 4) Away goals for, 5) Away goals against, 6) Drawing of lots.
(C) Champions

== See also ==
- 2020 Categoría Primera A season
- 2020 Copa Colombia
