= Yani Quintero =

Colombian footballer (born 2002)

Personal information
- Full name: Yani David Quintero Rivas
- Date of birth: 17 July 2002 (age 24)
- Place of birth: Buenaventura, Colombia
- Height: 1.86 m (6 ft 1 in)
- Position: Midfielder

Team information
- Current team: Deportivo Cali (on loan from Deportes Quindío)
- Number: 13

Youth career
- Universitario Popayán

Senior career*
Years	Team	Apps	(Gls)
2019	Boca Juniors de Cali	5	(0)
2020–	Deportes Quindío	43	(0)
2022–2024	→ Red Bull Bragantino II (loan)	22	(1)
2024–2025	→ Atlético Junior (loan)	18	(0)
2025–	→ Deportivo Cali (loan)	16	(0)

International career
2019	Colombia U17	2	(0)
- * Club domestic league appearances and goals as of 12 December 2025

Yani David Quintero Rivas (born 17 July 2002) is a Colombian footballer who plays as a midfielder Who plays in the Colombian club Deportivo Cali, on loan from Deportes Quindío.

== Club career ==
Born in Buenaventura, Valle del Cauca, Quintero played for Universitario Popayán as a youth. In 2019, he moved to Boca Juniors de Cali, and made his senior debut with the club during the Categoría Primera B tournament.

On 23 January 2020, Quintero was announced at Deportes Quindío also in the second division. He started to feature more regularly during the 2021 season, as the club achieved promotion to the Categoría Primera A.

Quintero made his top tier debut on 17 July 2021, starting in a 2–0 home win over Jaguares de Córdoba. On 21 February of the following year, he was loaned to Red Bull Bragantino, being initially assigned to the reserves.

== International career ==
Quintero represented Colombia at under-17 level in the 2019 South American U-17 Championship.

== Career statistics ==
=== Club ===
As of 17 July 2023.

Club	Season	League			Cup		Continental		State League		Other		Total	
Club	Season	Division	Apps	Goals	Apps	Goals	Apps	Goals	Apps	Goals	Apps	Goals	Apps	Goals
Boca Juniors de Cali	2019	Categoría Primera B	5	0	2	1	—		—		—		7	1
Deportes Quindío	2020	Categoría Primera B	9	0	4	1	—		—		—		13	1
Deportes Quindío	2021	Categoría Primera B	21	0	2	0	—		—		—		23	0
Deportes Quindío	2021	Categoría Primera A	13	0	0	0	—		—		—		13	0
Deportes Quindío	Total		43	0	6	1	—		—		—		49	1
Red Bull Bragantino II (loan)	2022	Paulista A2	—		—		—		7 (Note: Appearance(s) in Campeonato Paulista Série A2)	0	—		7	0
Red Bull Bragantino II (loan)	2023	Paulista A3	—		—		—		15 (Note: Appearance(s) in Campeonato Paulista Série A3)	1	1 (Note: Appearance(s) in Copa Paulista)	0	16	1
Red Bull Bragantino II (loan)	Total		—		—		—		22	1	1	0	23	1
Career total			48	0	8	2	0	0	22	1	1	0	79	3
