= Hernán Luna =

Colombian footballer (born 1999)

Personal information
- Full name: Hernán Camilo Luna Gómez
- Date of birth: 11 November 1999 (age 27)
- Place of birth: El Copey, Colombia
- Height: 1.82 m (6 ft 0 in)
- Position: Right winger

Team information
- Current team: Cúcuta Deportivo

Senior career*
Years	Team	Apps	(Gls)
2018–2020	Unión Magdalena	49	(7)
2021	Ilves	9	(1)
2023	Jaguares de Córdoba	4	(0)
2024	Bogotá	15	(4)
2025–	Cúcuta Deportivo	4	(0)
- * Club domestic league appearances and goals as of 14 March 2025

Hernán Camilo Luna Gómez (born 11 November 1999) is a Colombian professional footballer who plays as a right winger for Categoría Primera B club Cúcuta Deportivo.

== Club career ==
After playing in his native Colombia, Luna moved to Finland in April 2021 and signed with Veikkausliiga club Ilves for the 2021 season.

== Career statistics ==
As of 26 February 2025

Appearances and goals by club, season and competition
Club	Season	League			Cup (Note: Includes Copa Colombia)		Other		Total	
Club	Season	Division	Apps	Goals	Apps	Goals	Apps	Goals	Apps	Goals
Unión Magdalena	2018	Categoría Primera B	6	1	–		–		6	1
Unión Magdalena	2019	Categoría Primera A	23	1	4	1	–		27	2
Unión Magdalena	2020	Categoría Primera B	20	5	3	2	–		23	7
Unión Magdalena	Total		49	7	7	3	0	0	56	10
Ilves	2021	Veikkausliiga	9	1	0	0	–		9	1
Jaguares de Córdoba	2023	Categoría Primera A	4	0	–		–		4	0
Bogotá	2024	Categoría Primera B	15	4	0	0	–		15	4
Cúcuta Deportivo	2025	Categoría Primera B	4	0	0	0	–		4	0
Career total			81	12	7	3	0	0	22	1

== Honours ==
Unión Magdalena

- Categoría Primera B runner-up: 2018
