= Santiago Muñoz =

Santiago Muñoz may refer to:

- Santiago Montoya Muñoz, born 1991, Colombian footballer
- Santiago Muñoz (footballer, born 1999), Colombian footballer
- Santiago Muñoz (footballer, born 2002), Mexican footballer
- Santiago Muñoz Machado, Spanish jurist and academic
