= Agustín Vuletich =

Argentine footballer

Personal information
- Date of birth: 3 November 1991 (age 35)
- Place of birth: Arias, Argentina
- Height: 1.85 m (6 ft 1 in)
- Position: Forward

Team information
- Current team: Comunicaciones
- Number: 9

Youth career
- –2007: Belgrano Juniors
- 2007–2011: Vélez Sársfield

Senior career*
| Years | Team | Apps | (Gls) |
| 2011–2013 | Vélez Sársfield | 15 | (1) |
| 2012 | → Bellinzona (loan) | 2 | (0) |
| 2012 | → Cobresal (loan) | 13 | (2) |
| 2013 | → San Marcos (loan) | | |
| 2013–2015 | Olimpo | 22 | (4) |
| 2015 | Arouca | 12 | (2) |
| 2016 | Arsenal de Sarandí | 3 | (1) |
| 2016–2017 | Veracruz | 10 | (2) |
| 2017–2018 | Rionegro Águilas | 17 | (9) |
| 2018–2019 | Salernitana | 10 | (0) |
| 2019–2020 | Potenza | 13 | (1) |
| 2020 | Cúcuta Deportivo | 17 | (4) |
| 2021–2022 | Independiente Medellín | 30 | (10) |
| 2022 | Deportivo Cali | 17 | (1) |
| 2023–2024 | Racing Montevideo | 10 | (1) |
| 2024 | Águilas Doradas | 10 | (2) |
| 2024–2025 | UTA Arad | 11 | (2) |

International career
| 2011 | Argentina U20 | 2 | (0) |
- * Club domestic league appearances and goals as of 26 January 2025

Agustín Vuletich (Croatian: Agustin Vuletić; born 3 November 1991) is an Argentine professional footballer who plays as a forward for Liga Bantrab club Comunicaciones.

== Personal life ==
Vuletich was born in Arias, Córdoba Province. However, his ancestors are Serbs from Croatian region of Dalmatia and he is attempting to obtain a Croatian passport.

Apart from his professional football career, he studies law in the University of Flores, which is why he is nicknamed "the doctor".

== Club career ==
Vuletich made his professional debut for Vélez Sársfield on 27 March 2011, entering the field on the 86th minute of a 3–0 win against Arsenal de Sarandí as part of the 2011 Clausura. With Santiago Silva banned and Guillermo Franco injured, he started and played 79 minutes in the 2–1 away victory over Olimpo, on 2 April. He scored his first professional goal on a 2–3 home defeat to Quilmes.

During his first season with the team, he helped them win the 2011 Clausura tournament and reach the semi-finals of the 2011 Copa Libertadores.

Vuletich was loaned for six months to Swiss Challenge League side AC Bellinzona on 30 January 2012. He was loaned to Chilean side Cobresal in mid–2012. In January 2013, he was again loaned, now to San Marcos de Arica. In summer 2013, he was purchased by newly promoted Primera Division side Club Olimpo on a one-year contract. On 8 September, he scored the second in a historic 3–0 home victory against Boca Juniors.

On 21 January 2016, he joined Arsenal de Sarandí.

In August 2017 he joined Rionegro Águilas of the Categoria Primera A. He had a great 2017 season with the club, where he scored in four consecutive games, including two goals in an away victory against Medellin at Estadio Atanasio Girardot on 23 September. Although Rionegro finished last in the table, he scored 8 goals in 13 appearances.

On 18 September 2019 he signed with Serie C club Potenza. He was released from his Potenza contract by mutual consent on 9 January 2020.

On 25 December 2020, Vuletich joined Colombian club Independiente Medellín on a one-year contract. In February 2021, Medellin won the 2020 Copa Colombia, with Vuletich being a key player, assisting a goal and scoring in the penalty shootout to help his team overcome Deportes Tolima. Vuletich finished the 2021 Apertura with seven goals, and scored three in the Finalizacion tournament. In December 2021, it was announced that the club would release Vuletich. Speaking about the decision, he said, "I was a bit surprised because last week the club told me they would count with me and renovate my contract for the following season." During his time with the club, Vuletich scored 13 goals in 37 appearances, counting all competitions.

== International career ==
In July 2011, Vuletich was selected to represent Argentina at the FIFA U-20 World Cup to be played in Colombia. He played two games in the competition, both coming on as a substitute: the first group stage game against Mexico (1–0 victory) and the quarter-finals against Portugal (0–0 on extra time, and 4–5 defeat on penalty shootout, where Vuletich scored his penalty).

== Honours ==
Vélez Sársfield

- Argentine Primera División: 2011 Clausura

Independiente Medellín

- Copa Colombia: 2020
