= Diber Cambindo =

Colombian footballer (born 1996)

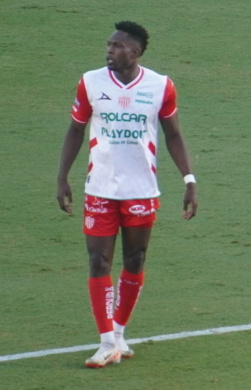
- Cambindo with Necaxa in 2025

Personal information
- Full name: Diber Armando Cambindo Abonia
- Date of birth: 17 February 1996 (age 30)
- Place of birth: Guachené, Colombia
- Height: 1.82 m (6 ft 0 in)
- Position: Striker

Team information
- Current team: León
- Number: 27

Youth career
- Fundación Habilidosos

Senior career*
| Years | Team | Apps | (Gls) |
| 2016–2017 | Unión San Felipe | 0 | (0) |
| 2017–2021 | Deportes Quindío | 29 | (16) |
| 2021 | → América de Cali (loan) | 13 | (1) |
| 2021–2023 | → Independiente Medellín (loan) | 102 | (29) |
| 2023–2024 | Cruz Azul | 18 | (4) |
| 2024 | → Necaxa (loan) | 32 | (14) |
| 2025 | Necaxa | 20 | (14) |
| 2026– | León | 29 | (12) |

International career^{‡}
| 2023 | Colombia | 2 | (0) |
- * Club domestic league appearances and goals as of 21 October 2026 ‡ National team caps and goals as of 10 December 2023

Diber Armando Cambindo Abonia (born 17 February 1996) is a Colombian professional footballer who plays as a striker for Liga MX club León.

== Career ==
=== Club ===
Cambindo made his professional debut in 2016 with Unión San Felipe in Chile. The following year, he returned to Colombia and signed with Deportes Quindío.

In February 2021, he joined América de Cali on loan, and in June of the same year, he moved to Independiente Medellín.

In July 2023, Cambindo was transferred to Cruz Azul in Mexico. Seeking more playing time, he joined Necaxa on loan for the following tournament. His performances earned him a permanent transfer after finishing the Clausura 2024 as the league's top scorer.

In December 2025, he signed with León.

=== International ===
Cambindo was called up to the Colombia national football team for their exhibition match against the United States on 28 January 2023. Cambindo made his debut as a second-half substitute in the 0–0 draw.

== Career statistics ==
=== Club ===
As of match played on 25 January 2025

Appearances and goals by club, season and competition
| Club | Season | League | | | National cup (Note: Includes Copa Chile, Copa Colombia) | | Continental | | Other | | Total | |
| Club | Season | Division | Apps | Goals | Apps | Goals | Apps | Goals | Apps | Goals | Apps | Goals |
|---|---|---|---|---|---|---|---|---|---|---|---|---|
| Unión San Felipe | 2016–17 | Primera B de Chile | 3 | 0 | 0 | 0 | — | | — | | 3 | 0 |
| Deportes Quindío | 2017 | Categoría Primera B | 15 | 4 | 4 | 0 | — | | — | | 19 | 4 |
| Deportes Quindío | 2018 | Categoría Primera B | 19 | 3 | 4 | 1 | — | | — | | 23 | 4 |
| Deportes Quindío | 2019 | Categoría Primera B | 28 | 9 | 4 | 0 | — | | — | | 32 | 9 |
| Deportes Quindío | 2020 | Categoría Primera B | 18 | 12 | 6 | 5 | — | | — | | 24 | 17 |
| Deportes Quindío | 2021 | Categoría Primera B | 3 | 2 | 0 | 0 | — | | — | | 3 | 2 |
| Deportes Quindío | Total | | 83 | 30 | 18 | 6 | 0 | 0 | 0 | 0 | 101 | 36 |
| América de Cali (loan) | 2021 | Categoría Primera A | 11 | 1 | 0 | 0 | 2 (Note: Appearance(s) in Copa Libertadores) | 0 | 0 | 0 | 13 | 1 |
| Independiente Medellín (loan) | 2021 | Categoría Primera A | 18 | 3 | 4 | 1 | — | | — | | 22 | 4 |
| Independiente Medellín (loan) | 2022 | Categoría Primera A | 46 | 12 | 6 | 3 | 6 (Note: Appearance(s) in Copa Sudamericana) | 1 | — | | 58 | 16 |
| Independiente Medellín (loan) | 2023 | Categoría Primera A | 17 | 8 | 0 | 0 | 5 | 1 | — | | 22 | 9 |
| Independiente Medellín (loan) | Total | | 81 | 23 | 10 | 4 | 11 | 2 | 0 | 0 | 102 | 29 |
| Cruz Azul | 2023–24 | Liga MX | 16 | 4 | — | | 2 (Note: Appearance(s) in Leagues Cup) | 0 | — | | 18 | 4 |
| Necaxa (loan) | 2023–24 | Liga MX | 16 | 9 | — | | 0 | 0 | — | | 16 | 9 |
| Necaxa (loan) | 2024–25 | Liga MX | 16 | 5 | — | | 3 | 1 | — | | 19 | 6 |
| Necaxa (loan) | Total | | 32 | 14 | — | | 3 | 1 | 0 | 0 | 35 | 15 |
| Necaxa | 2024–25 | Liga MX | 3 | 3 | — | | 0 | 0 | — | | 3 | 3 |
| Career total | | | 229 | 75 | 28 | 10 | 18 | 3 | 0 | 0 | 275 | 88 |

=== International ===
As of match played on 10 December 2023

Appearances and goals by national team and year
| National team | Year | Apps | Goals |
|---|---|---|---|
| Colombia | 2023 | 2 | 0 |
| Total | | 2 | 0 |

== Honours ==
Individual

- Liga MX Golden Boot (Shared): Clausura 2024
- Liga MX All-Star: 2025
