= Matías Mier =

Uruguayan footballer (born 1990)

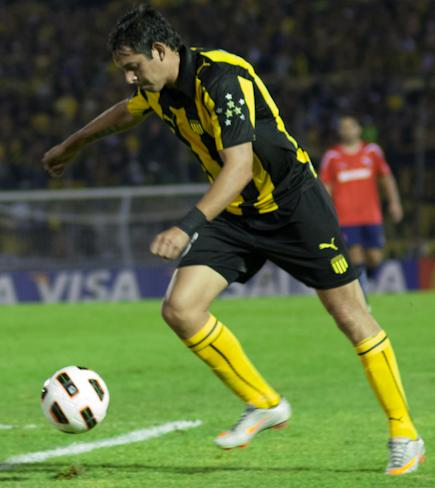
- Mier playing for Peñarol in 2011

Personal information
- Full name: Henry Matías Mier Codina
- Date of birth: 2 August 1990 (age 36)
- Place of birth: Montevideo, Uruguay
- Height: 1.85 m (6 ft 1 in)
- Positions: Attacking midfielder; left winger

Team information
- Current team: Alianza
- Number: 7

Youth career
- Oriental
- –2006: Rentistas

Senior career*
Years	Team	Apps	(Gls)
2008–2010	Fénix	41	(6)
2011	Peñarol	11	(1)
2011–2016	Universidad Católica	40	(11)
2014	→ Santiago Wanderers (loan)	17	(2)
2015–2016	→ Rentistas (loan)	28	(10)
2016	Muaither	2	(0)
2017	Peñarol	8	(1)
2017–2018	Atlético Junior	21	(2)
2018–2020	La Equidad	67	(17)
2021–2022	Independiente Medellin	16	(2)
2021	→ Central Córdoba (loan)	8	(0)
2022	Santa Fe	41	(5)
2023–2025	Bhayangkara	59	(25)
2025	→ Barito Putera (loan)	15	(8)
2025	River Plate Montevideo	2	(0)
2026	Zacatecoluca	19	(9)
2026-	Alianza	7	(1)
- * Club domestic league appearances and goals as of 18 January 2026

Henry Matías Mier Codina (born 2 August 1990) is a Uruguayan professional footballer who plays as an attacking midfielder or left winger for Primera División de El Salvador club Alianza.

== Club career ==
=== Early career ===
Mier began his career at Rentistas in 2007 and transferred to Fénix in 2008. He left the club in December 2010 after the 2010 Apertura season.

=== Peñarol ===
Mier joined Peñarol in January 2011. On 3 June 2011 he scored a crucial away goal in a Copa Libertadores semi final clash against Vélez Sársfield of Argentina. Although Peñarol were defeated on the night 2–1, they progressed to the finals on the away goals rule as the aggregate score was 2–2 over after they had won the 1st leg 1–0 in Uruguay a week prior. Mier played both legs of the finals, where they lost 2–1 on aggregate to Santos.

=== Universidad Católica ===
On 18 July 2011, it was reported that Argentine Primera División club Racing Club were interested in purchasing Mier for the next season, because Mariano González recommended the player to Racing manager Diego Simeone.

Two days later, on 20 July, Chilean Primera División club Universidad Católica signed Mier on a three-year contract, which would keep him at the club until 2014. On 22 July, he was officially presented during a press conference. He made his Primera División debut against Deportes Iquique, and his first goal came on 13 August in a 4–0 win over Unión La Calera.

In November 2011, Mier won his first trophy as a professional when Universidad Católica won the 2011 Copa Chile, beating Deportes Magallanes on penalties in the finals.

In January 2014, he was loaned out to Santiago Wanderers. In August 2015, he was loaned out to Rentistas, rejoining the club after nine years. He impressed with Rentistas, scoring ten goals in 28 appearances.

In January 2016, he was expected to join Atlético Bucaramanga, but the deal fell through.

=== Muaither ===
On 12 June 2016, Mier joined Qatar Stars League club Muaither and only made 2 appearances for the club before leaving.

=== Return to Peñarol ===
In February 2017 he returned to Uruguay with Peñarol. On 28 April 2017, after Palmeiras beat Peñarol in the 2017 Copa Libertadores, there was a mass brawl, and Mier received a three match suspension for fighting Palmeiras defender Felipe Melo. At the end of the Apertura tournament Mier left the club.

=== Junior ===
In July 2017, Mier joined Colombian club Atlético Junior to play the 2017 Copa Sudamericana, 2017 Copa Colombia, and 2017 Torneo Finalizacion. Mier played two matches in the knockout stages as Junior won the Copa Colombia, defeating Independiente Medellín 3–1 on aggregate in the final.

=== La Equidad ===
On 22 June 2018, Mier joined Bogota-based club La Equidad. He scored his first goal on 9 October 2018, in a 3–2 win against Millonarios. On 3 April 2019, Mier scored his first goal of the 2019 Apertura in a 3–1 victory against América de Cali. Four days later, he scored the opening goal in a 2–2 draw against his former club, Junior. Mier scored a goal in the Copa Sudamericana quarter-finals against Atletico Mineiro to put the match 1–1. However, Mineiro won the match 3–1 and eliminated La Equidad from the tournament on 28 August. On 14 September 2019, Mier scored the only goal in a victory against Patriotas Boyacá. Mier scored three more goals in the 2019 Finalizacion tournament, against America de Cali, Patriotas again, and Cúcuta Deportivo.

Mier had a great individual season in the 2020 Categoría Primera A season, where he scored 10 goals in 19 appearances. His first two goals came in a 4–1 victory against Cucuta on 23 February. He scored another two goals, including an Olympic goal, in a 4–0 victory against Boyaca Chico in September. In October, he scored goals in victories against Independiente Medellin and Deportes Tolima, before adding his third brace of the season in a 2–1 victory against America at Estadio Pascual Guerrero, which helped his team secure qualification for the playoffs in the last round.

=== Independiente Medellin ===
Mier was announced as an Independiente Medellín player on 18 December 2020. Mier was instrumental in Medellin's 2020 Copa Colombia title, scoring a goal and then his penalty in the shootout against Deportes Tolima.

Shortly after the conclusion of the 2021 Apertura, Mier was loaned out to Central Córdoba, but only playing 354 minutes during 8 appearances.

=== Independiente Santa Fe ===
In December 2021, Mier signed with Independiente Santa Fe, scoring 5 goals and grabbing 6 assists in 41 appearances.

=== Bhayangkara ===
In January 2023, Mier moved to the Asian continent, signing for Indonesian club Bhayangkara halfway through the 2022–23 season. He had an instant impact in his first season with the club, scoring 10 goals in 15 appearances. Despite his team suffering relegation at the end of the 2023-24 season, Mier continued to show his individual brilliance, scoring 13 goals in 31 appearances.

=== Bhayangkara ===
In January 2023, Mier moved to the Asian continent, signing for Indonesian club Bhayangkara halfway through the 2022–23 season. He had an instant impact in his first season, scoring 10 goals and providing 7 assists in just 15 appearances. Despite the team's relegation at the end of the 2023–24 season, Mier remained a key performer, recording 13 goals and 9 assists in 31 matches. He stayed with the club during the first half of their Liga 2 campaign, contributing 2 goals in 13 appearances before returning to the top flight on loan.

=== Barito Putera (loan) ===
On 7 January 2025, Mier joined Barito Putera on loan for the remainder of the 2024–25 season. He became an immediate fan favorite, notably scoring a hat-trick in a 3–0 victory against Persebaya Surabaya on 25 January. He finished his loan spell with 8 goals in 15 appearances.

=== Return to Uruguay and El Salvador ===
Following the expiration of his contract with Bhayangkara, Mier returned to Uruguay and signed with River Plate Montevideo on 1 August 2025. He made two substitute appearances for the club during the 2025 Clausura tournament.

In January 2026, Mier moved to El Salvador to join Zacatecoluca F.C. for the Clausura 2026 season. He made his debut for the club on 17 January 2026 in a league match against C.D. Cacahuatique; he scored his first goal for the club in the 6th minute of the match, which ultimately ended in a 1–2 defeat.

== Honours ==
Universidad Católica

- Copa Chile: 2011

Junior

- Copa Colombia: 2017

Independiente Medellin

- Copa Colombia: 2020
