= Copa Claro (football) =

The Copa Claro is an association football tournament held on San Andrés y Providencia for the local clubs on the island. The tournament is available for thousands of children and adolescents from vulnerable populations in 10 departments, Atlántico, Cauca, Antioquia, Norte de Santander, Risaralda, La Guajira, Valle del Cauca, Chocó, Sucre and Tolima. 2014 edition of the tournament was kicked off in Erwin O'Neill Stadium.

== Past champions ==
Season	Winner	Score	Runners–up	Ref
2014	Soccer SAI	4–3	Club Hitel El Dorado	
