= José Luis García (footballer, born 1988) =

Colombian footballer and manager (born 1988)

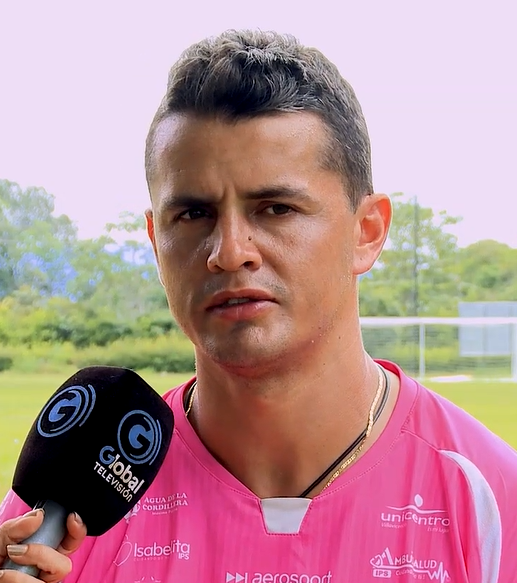
- García in 2026

Personal information
- Full name: José Luis García Herrera
- Date of birth: 11 June 1988 (age 38)
- Place of birth: Manizales, Colombia
- Height: 1.85 m (6 ft 1 in)
- Position: Centre-back

Team information
- Current team: Llaneros (manager)

Youth career
- 1998–2007: Real Santander

Senior career*
Years	Team	Apps	(Gls)
2008–2009	Real Santander		
2010–2011	Atlético Nacional	0	(0)
2010	→ Atlético La Sabana (loan)		
2012–2014	Real Santander	62	(3)
2015	Uniautónoma	11	(1)
2016–2017	Real Santander	10	(0)

Managerial career
- 2019–2023: Real Santander (Note: The club was called Real San Andrés in 2019)
- 2024: Águilas Doradas (assistant)
- 2024: Águilas Doradas (interim)
- 2024: Águilas Doradas
- 2025–2026: Llaneros
- * Club domestic league appearances and goals

José Luis García Herrera (born 11 June 1988) is a Colombian football manager and former footballer who played as a centre-back.

== Playing career ==
García was born in Manizales, and began his career with Real Santander. He was sold to Atlético Nacional for the 2010 season, but spent that year on loan at Atlético La Sabana as both clubs reached a partnership.

García spent the first half of the 2011 campaign nursing a knee injury, and was released by the Verdolagas in December, after failing to make a single appearance for the club. He subsequently returned to Real Santander, before signing for Uniautónoma in January 2015.

García returned to Real Santander for the 2016 season, before retiring in January 2018, aged just 29.

== Managerial career ==
Immediately after retiring, García was named sporting director of his last club Real Santander. On 19 December 2018, he was appointed manager of the club, which had moved to San Andrés and renamed to Real San Andrés.

García was in charge of Real Santander until 5 January 2024, when the club announced his departure. Seventeen days later, he was named Hernán Darío Gómez's assistant at Águilas Doradas.

On 28 March 2024, García was appointed interim manager of Águilas, after Gómez was sacked. Although he was confirmed as manager for the remainder of the year on 15 May, he was sacked on 7 October.

On 9 March 2025, García was appointed by Llaneros as their new manager. After managing the team for one year and a half, he was dismissed on 15 October 2026.
