= Harold Gómez =

Colombian footballer (born 1992)

Personal information
- Full name: Harold Andrés Gómez Muñoz
- Date of birth: 21 April 1992 (age 34)
- Place of birth: Popayán, Cauca, Colombia
- Height: 1.74 m (5 ft 8 1/2 in)
- Position: Right back

Team information
- Current team: Deportivo Cali
- Number: 19

Youth career
- Deportivo Cali

Senior career*
Years	Team	Apps	(Gls)
2009–2011	Deportivo Cali	12	(0)
2012–2013	Once Caldas	29	(1)
2014	Uniautónoma	2	(0)
2015	Cúcuta Deportivo	12	(1)
2016	Deportivo Pasto	4	(0)
2016–2017	Deportivo Pereira	40	(6)
2018–2019	Atlético Bucaramanga	65	(2)
2020–	Deportivo Cali	4	(0)
- * Club domestic league appearances and goals as of 15:38, 26 April 2020 (UTC)

Harold Andrés Gómez Muñoz (born 21 April 1992) is a Colombian professional footballer who plays for Deportivo Cali, as a right back.
