= Universidad de Flores =

Coordinates: 34.6224°S 58.4463°W

Flores University
- Universidad de Flores
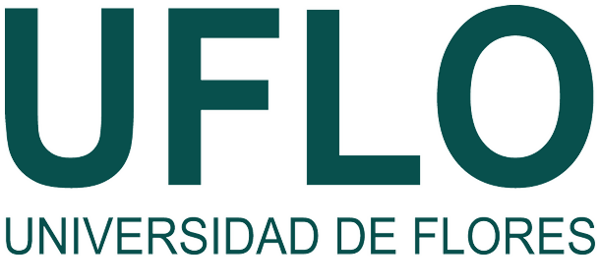
- Established: 1994
- Location: Buenos Aires, Argentina

The Universidad de Flores (Flores University, UFLO) is a private university in Argentina founded in 1994. As a relatively young university, it is still growing and continues to offer new courses and careers. The main campus is located in the Flores neighborhood of the capital city of Buenos Aires, Argentina. There is also a branch campus located in Cipolletti, Río Negro Province.

On the main campus, six faculties offer courses on Physical Activity and Sports; Administration; Law; Engineering; Socio-Environmental Planning; and Psychology and Social Sciences. In 1999 additional careers were made available for study, including Educational Psychology; Architecture; and Graphic Design. UFLO is also home of the Family Businesses' Institute, the Jazz Studies' Institute, the Alternative Conflict Resolution Center, and the Vocational Research and Career Development Center.
