= Pipe Gómez =

Colombian footballer (born 1999)

Personal information
- Full name: Luis Felipe Gómez Miranda
- Date of birth: 11 October 1999 (age 27)
- Place of birth: Cartagena, Colombia
- Height: 1.75 m (5 ft 9 in)
- Position: Forward

Team information
- Current team: Once Caldas
- Number: 9

Youth career
- Nuevo Milenio
- Cyclones Cali

Senior career*
Years	Team	Apps	(Gls)
2018–	Leones	84	(19)
2022	→ Santa Clara (loan)	3	(0)
2022–2023	→ Nacional (loan)	25	(5)
2023–2024	→ Torreense (loan)	18	(2)
2024–2025	→ América de Cali (loan)	37	(3)
2025–	→ Once Caldas (loan)	17	(0)
- * Club domestic league appearances and goals as of 12 December 2025

Luis Felipe "Pipe" Gómez Miranda (born 11 October 1999) is a Colombian professional footballer who plays as a forward for Once Caldas on loan from Leones.

== Club career ==
Gómez is a youth product of the Colombian academies Nuevo Milenio and Cyclones Cali, before moving to Leones in 2018. He made his professional debut with Leones in a 0–0 Categoría Primera A tie with Once Caldas on 9 October 2018. He was the top scorer in the 2021 Categoría Primera B season, with 18 goals.

On 1 February 2022, he joined the Portuguese club Santa Clara on loan in the Primeira Liga.

On 22 August 2022, Gómez moved on loan to Nacional.

On 11 July 2023, Gómez signed for Liga Portugal 2 side Torreense.
