= Luis Sánchez (Colombian footballer) =

Colombian footballer (born 2000)

Personal information
- Full name: Luis Francisco Sánchez Mosquera
- Date of birth: 18 September 2000 (age 26)
- Place of birth: Cúcuta, Colombia
- Position: Midfielder

Team information
- Current team: Once Caldas
- Number: 10

Youth career
- América de Cali

Senior career*
Years	Team	Apps	(Gls)
2018–2024	América de Cali	74	(8)
2019–2020	→ Saint-Étienne B (loan)	10	(0)
2024	Central Córdoba SdE	5	(0)
2025–	Fortaleza	19	(2)
2025–	Once Caldas	12	(1)
- * Club domestic league appearances and goals as of 12 December 2025

Luis Francisco Sánchez Mosquera (born 18 September 2000) is a Colombian footballer who plays as a midfielder for Once Caldas, on loan from Fortaleza.

== Career ==
Sánchez started his career with América de Cali in Colombia.

In 2019, Sánchez was sent on loan to the reserves of French Ligue 1 side Saint-Étienne, but found it hard to adapt due to the language difference.

On 6 June 2024, Sánchez joined Central Córdoba SdE in the Argentine Primera División, signing a contract until the end of 2025. After a short stint in Argentina, he returned to Colombia to join Fortaleza.
