= Auli Oliveros =

Colombian footballer (born 2001)

Personal information
- Full name: Auli Alexander Oliveros Estrada
- Date of birth: 1 August 2001 (age 25)
- Place of birth: Bucaramanga, Colombia
- Height: 1.75 m (5 ft 9 in)
- Position: Winger

Team information
- Current team: Águilas Doradas
- Number: 33

Youth career
- Millonarios
- Atlético Bucaramanga

Senior career*
| Years | Team | Apps | (Gls) |
| 2019 | Atlético Bucaramanga | 0 | (0) |
| 2020 | Cúcuta Deportivo | 10 | (0) |
| 2021–2022 | Santa Fe | 5 | (0) |
| 2022 | → Tigres (loan) | 7 | (0) |
| 2022– | Águilas Doradas | 62 | (2) |
- * Club domestic league appearances and goals as of 15:52, 11 October 2025 (UTC)

Auli Alexander Oliveros Estrada (born 1 August 2001) is a Colombian footballer who plays as a winger for Categoría Primera A side Águilas Doradas.

== Club career ==
=== Early years ===
Born in Bucaramanga, Oliveros started playing football when his father took him to a football school, Escuela De Futbol Bumangues, at the age of five. Oliveros later joined Millonarios, before moving to Bucaramanga where he joined Atlético Bucaramanga.

=== Professional career ===
Oliveros got his official and professional debut for Atlético Bucaramanga on 10 April 2019 in the Copa Colombia against Cúcuta Deportivo. However, he left Bucaramanga at the end of 2019, because he couldn't agree on a new deal with the club.

Oliveros joined Cúcuta Deportivo for the 2020 season. In his first season at the club, he made 10 league appearances. On 7 January 2021, Oliveros moved to Independiente Santa Fe. To get some more playing time, Oliveros was loaned out to Categoría Primera B side Tigres in January 2022 for the rest of the year.

In July 2022, Oliveros signed with Águilas Doradas.
