= Felipe Jaramillo =

Colombian footballer (born 1996)

Personal information
- Full name: Felipe Jaramillo Velásquez
- Date of birth: 18 April 1996 (age 30)
- Place of birth: Medellín, Colombia
- Height: 1.82 m (6 ft 0 in)
- Position: Midfielder

Team information
- Current team: Deportivo Pasto
- Number: 17

Youth career
- 2010–2015: Atlético Nacional
- 2016: Gimnasia LP
- 2016: Defensores de Cambaceres

Senior career*
Years	Team	Apps	(Gls)
2017–2021	Itagüí Leones	67	(1)
2019	→ Millonarios (loan)	35	(1)
2020–2021	→ América de Cali (loan)	18	(0)
2021	→ Deportes La Serena (loan)	24	(0)
2022	Águilas Doradas	15	(1)
2023–2024	Envigado	56	(0)
2025–	Deportivo Pasto	32	(0)
- * Club domestic league appearances and goals as of 12 December 2025

Felipe Jaramillo Velásquez (born 18 April 1996) is a Colombian professional footballer who plays as a midfielder for Categoría Primera A side Deportivo Pasto.

== Career ==
In his early life, Jaramillo was in the Atlético Nacional Youth Team from 2010 to 2015. After, he went to Argentina and was in the youth teams of both Gimnasia y Esgrima (LP) and Defensores de Cambaceres. Back in Colombia, on 2017 he began his professional career after joining Itagüí Leones in the Categoría Primera B, becoming the team captain and getting the promotion to the Categoría Primera A. After the relegation of Itagüí Leones, on 2019 he was loaned to Millonarios and to América de Cali on 2020, playing at the 2020 Copa Libertadores and winning the 2020 Categoría Primera A.

On 2021, he moved on loan to Deportes La Serena in the Chilean Primera División.

== Honours ==
Millonarios

- Torneo Fox Sports: 2019

América de Cali

- Categoría Primera A: 2020
- Torneo ESPN: 2020
