= Santiago Muñoz (footballer, born 1999) =

Colombian footballer

Personal information
- Full name: Santiago Muñoz Gómez
- Date of birth: 8 June 1999 (age 27)
- Place of birth: Bogotá, Colombia
- Height: 1.73 m (5 ft 8 in)
- Position: Forward

Team information
- Current team: Al-Ahly

Senior career*
Years	Team	Apps	(Gls)
2018–2020	Leones	4	(0)
2020–2023	Envigado	21	(0)
2023–2024	Once Caldas	3	(0)
2024–2025	Atlético Huila	34	(6)
2025–2026	Independiente Rivadavia	4	(1)
2026–	Al-Ahly	0	(0)
- * Club domestic league appearances and goals as of 21:26, 15 March 2026 (UTC)

Santiago Muñoz Gómez (born 8 June 1999) is a Colombian footballer who currently plays as a forward for Libyan Premier League club Al-Ahly.

== Career statistics ==
=== Club ===
As of 26 October 2020.

Club	Season	League			Cup		Continental		Other		Total	
Club	Season	Division	Apps	Goals	Apps	Goals	Apps	Goals	Apps	Goals	Apps	Goals
Leones	2018	Categoría Primera A	1	0	0	0	0	0	0	0	1	0
Leones	2019	Categoría Primera B	3	0	1 (Note: Appearances in the Copa Colombia)	0	0	0	0	0	1	0
Leones	2020	Categoría Primera B	0	0	0	0	0	0	0	0	0	0
Leones	Total		4	0	0	1	0	0	0	0	5	0
Envigado	2020	Categoría Primera A	5	0	1	0	0	0	0	0	6	0
Career total			9	0	2	0	0	0	0	0	11	0

== Honours ==
Independiente Rivadavia

- Copa Argentina: 2025
