= Yeison Guzmán =

Colombian footballer (born 1998)

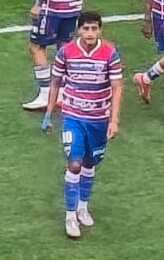
- Guzmán playing for Fortaleza in 2025

Personal information
- Full name: Yeison Estiven Guzmán Gómez
- Date of birth: 22 March 1998 (age 28)
- Place of birth: La Unión, Colombia
- Height: 1.70 m (5 ft 7 in)
- Position: Attacking midfielder

Team information
- Current team: América de Cali (on loan from Fortaleza)
- Number: 10

Youth career
- 2011–2015: Envigado

Senior career*
Years	Team	Apps	(Gls)
2016–2021	Envigado	120	(23)
2021–2022	Atlético Nacional	59	(9)
2023–2024	Deportes Tolima	85	(26)
2025	Torpedo Moscow	11	(5)
2025–	Fortaleza	5	(0)
2026–	→ América de Cali	15	(9)
- * Club domestic league appearances and goals as of 16 April 2026

Yeison Estiven Guzmán Gómez (born 22 March 1998) is a Colombian professional footballer who plays as an attacking midfielder for América de Cali, on loan from Fortaleza.

== Club career ==
=== Envigado ===
Born in La Unión, Antioquia, Guzmán was an Envigado youth graduate. He made his first team debut at the age of 17 on 10 February 2016, coming on as a second-half substitute for Diego Gregori in a 0–0 home draw against Rionegro Águilas, for the year's Copa Colombia.

Guzmán made his Categoría Primera A debut on 26 February 2017, replacing Joseph Cox late into a 1–2 away loss against Deportes Tolima. After only ten league appearances in the 2017 campaign, he became a regular starter in 2018, and scored his first senior goal on 18 February 2018 in a 1–0 home win against Once Caldas.

On 16 May 2018, Guzmán scored a brace in a 2–1 away success over Deportivo Pasto in the national cup. On 28 September of the following year, he scored a hat-trick in a 3–2 win at Atlético Bucaramanga.

On 11 February 2021, Guzmán renewed his contract for a further three years.

==== Cruzeiro transfer controversy ====
On 15 April 2021, Brazilian side Cruzeiro announced that they reached an agreement with Envigado for the transfer of Guzmán, with the player signing a four-year deal. However, after being "unsure" about some details of the negotiation, Guzmán did not move to his new club, and the deal was cancelled on 20 April, after Envigado released an announcement stating that Guzmán would continue at the club; Cruzeiro also announced that he would take legal actions against the player.

=== Deportes Tolima ===
In December 2022, Guzman joined Deportes Tolima. In the 2024 Finalizacion finals, Guzman was heavily criticized for his performance in the second leg against former club Atletico Nacional, where he attempted a panenka penalty which was saved by David Ospina.

== Career statistics ==
As of 24 May 2025

Club	Season	League			Cup		Continental		Other		Total	
Club	Season	Division	Apps	Goals	Apps	Goals	Apps	Goals	Apps	Goals	Apps	Goals
Envigado	2016	Categoría Primera A	0	0	3	0	—		—		3	0
Envigado	2017	Categoría Primera A	10	0	2	0	—		—		12	0
Envigado	2018	Categoría Primera A	33	6	3	2	—		—		36	8
Envigado	2019	Categoría Primera A	39	8	2	1	—		—		41	9
Envigado	2020	Categoría Primera A	21	5	2	2	—		—		23	7
Envigado	2021	Categoría Primera A	17	4	0	0	—		—		17	4
Envigado	Total		120	23	12	5	0	0	0	0	132	28
Atlético Nacional	2021	Categoría Primera A	21	5	7	0	—		—		28	5
Atlético Nacional	2022	Categoría Primera A	38	4	1	0	1 (Note: Appearance in Copa Libertadores)	0	—		40	4
Atlético Nacional	Total		59	9	8	0	1	0	0	0	68	9
Deportes Tolima	2023	Categoría Primera A	43	8	1	0	6 (Note: Appearances in Copa Sudamericana)	2	—		50	10
Deportes Tolima	2024	Categoría Primera A	42	18	1	0	1	0	—		44	18
Deportes Tolima	Total		85	26	2	0	7	2	0	0	94	28
Torpedo Moscow	2024–25	Russian First League	11	5	0	0	–		–		11	5
Career total			275	63	22	5	8	2	0	0	305	70

== Honours ==
Atlético Nacional

- Copa Colombia: 2021
- Categoría Primera A: 2022 Apertura
