= Julián Zea =

Colombian footballer (born 1999)

Personal information
- Full name: Julián Esteban Zea Macca
- Date of birth: 17 January 1999 (age 27)
- Place of birth: Valle del Cauca, Colombia
- Height: 1.72 m (5 ft 8 in)
- Position: Forward

Team information
- Current team: Oliveira do Bairro

Youth career
- Deportivo Cali

Senior career*
Years	Team	Apps	(Gls)
2018–2019	Deportivo Cali	3	(0)
2019	Tauro	21	(2)
2020–2022	Alianza Petrolera	21	(1)
2023	Nogoom FC		
2024	Makas FC		
2025–	Oliveira do Bairro	0	(0)
- * Club domestic league appearances and goals as of 18:39, 18 April 2022 (UTC)

Julián Esteban Zea Macca (born 17 January 1999) is a Colombian footballer who plays as a forward for Portuguese club Oliveira do Bairro.

== Club career ==
=== Deportivo Cali ===
Zea joined Deportivo Cali when he was 8 years old. He played his way up through the youth ranks and got his professional debut against La Equidad on 30 August 2018 in a cup game, where he played from start. His Categoría Primera A debut came nearly two months later against Jaguares de Córdoba. Those two games was his only appearances in that season.

Zea signed a new three-year deal with Cali in January 2019. However, Zea only played a total of 63 minutes, divided into 2 matches, in the whole 2019 season.

=== Tauro ===
In the summer 2019, Zea and two other Colombian players from Deportivo Cali, together joined Tauro F.C. in Panama. Zea quickly became a regular player for the team, playing 23 games and scoring two goals in six months, helping the team winning the league title in that season.

=== Alianza Petrolera ===
In February 2020, Zea returned to Colombia and joined Alianza Petrolera. He got his debut a week later against La Equidad. He left the club at the end of June 2022.

=== Later clubs ===
In February 2023, Zea joined Egyptian side Nogoom FC. In 2024, Zea played for Colombian amateur club Makas FC.

On 9 September 2025, Zea was presented as a new player at the Portuguese club Oliveira do Bairro.
