= Piedecuesta =

Coordinates: 7°05′N 73°00′W

- Municipality and city
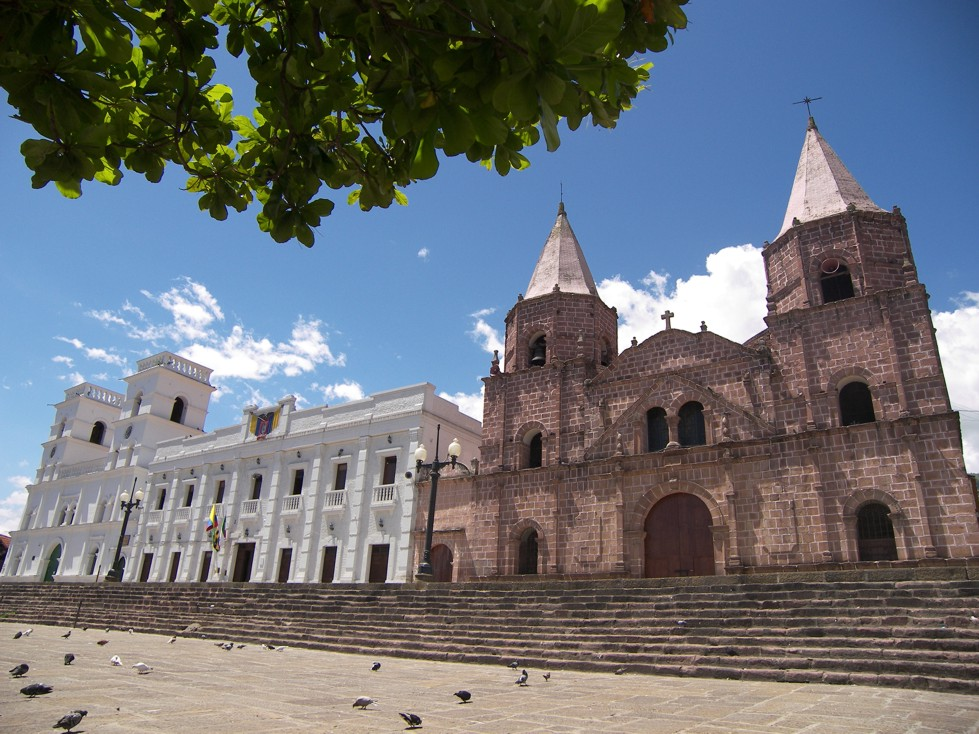

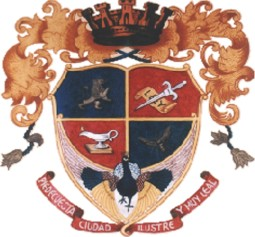
- Flag Coat of arms

- Location of the municipality and town of Piedecuesta in the Santander Department of Colombia.
- Country: Colombia
- Department: Santander Department

Area
  - Municipality and city: 484.6 km^{2} (187.1 sq mi)
  - Urban: 11.2 km^{2} (4.3 sq mi)
- Elevation: 1,005 m (3,297 ft)

Population (2020 est.)
  - Municipality and city: 182,959
  - Density: 377.5/km^{2} (977.8/sq mi)
  - Urban: 150,483
  - Urban density: 13,400/km^{2} (34,800/sq mi)
- Demonym(s): Piedecuestano, -a
- Time zone: UTC-5 (Colombia Standard Time)

Piedecuesta (Spanish pronunciation: [pjeðeˈkwesta], officially Villa de San Carlos del Pie de la Cuesta) is a city and municipality in the Santander Department in northeastern Colombia, South America. The city has a population of about 150,000. It is part of the metropolitan zone of Bucaramanga, which is the fifth largest urban area of Colombia by population.

== Geography ==
Piedecuesta is situated in the Rio de Oro valley. One of its most notable landmarks is the Cantera's Hill, on top of which sits a large statue of the Virgin Mary (known locally as Cantera's virgin). Other landmarks include Guatiguara's valley, the Saints' Plateau, part of Chicamocha Canyon, and Ruitoque Plateau.

== Economy ==
Piedecuesta is an important agricultural area; some products are Castilla blackberries (major national producer), tobacco (a traditional product since the Spanish Colonial Era), Tahitian lime (one of the largest national producers), and sugar cane (the town remains a major panela producer).

The town is a major service center and owns the most develop-able land of a metropolitan city. Piedecuesta also contains multiple rivers within its boundaries, such as the Gold River, the Manco River, and the Hato River. Recent developments include: Ruitoque Plateau, which offers golf courses and high level condominiums; the Valley of Menzuly, which recently (2022) completed building of an international hospital; and The Saints' Plateau, a tourist destination.

Industrial development in Piedecuesta has seen recent surges with the expansion of large companies into the area. These companies include ICP(Colombian Institute of Petroleum) and UIS Guatiguará (a high-level research center of the Industrial University of Santander).

== Tourism ==
The Saints' Plateau landscape includes several waterfalls and views of Chicamocha Canyon.

Holy Week: As most citizens of Piedecuesta are of the Catholic faith, this day is traditionally spent visiting religious monuments such as the virgin of the Cantera's Hill, the Mountain of Hermits, and the procession of Nazarene into the main streets.

Liberty Park lies in the center of the town and is surrounded by several buildings, including the San Francisco Javier church (which was built with red stone from the Cantera's Hill) and the Perpetuo Socorro church (the first church of the town). The presence of two large churches in a town of this size is unusual in Colombia.

The Municipal Palace is an ancient building of the local government.

== Sports ==
Estadio Villa Concha is an association football stadium in Piedecuesta, it is home to Real Santander association football team since 2021.
