= Erwin O'Neill Stadium =

Football stadium in San Andrés, Colombia

Erwin O'Neil Stadium
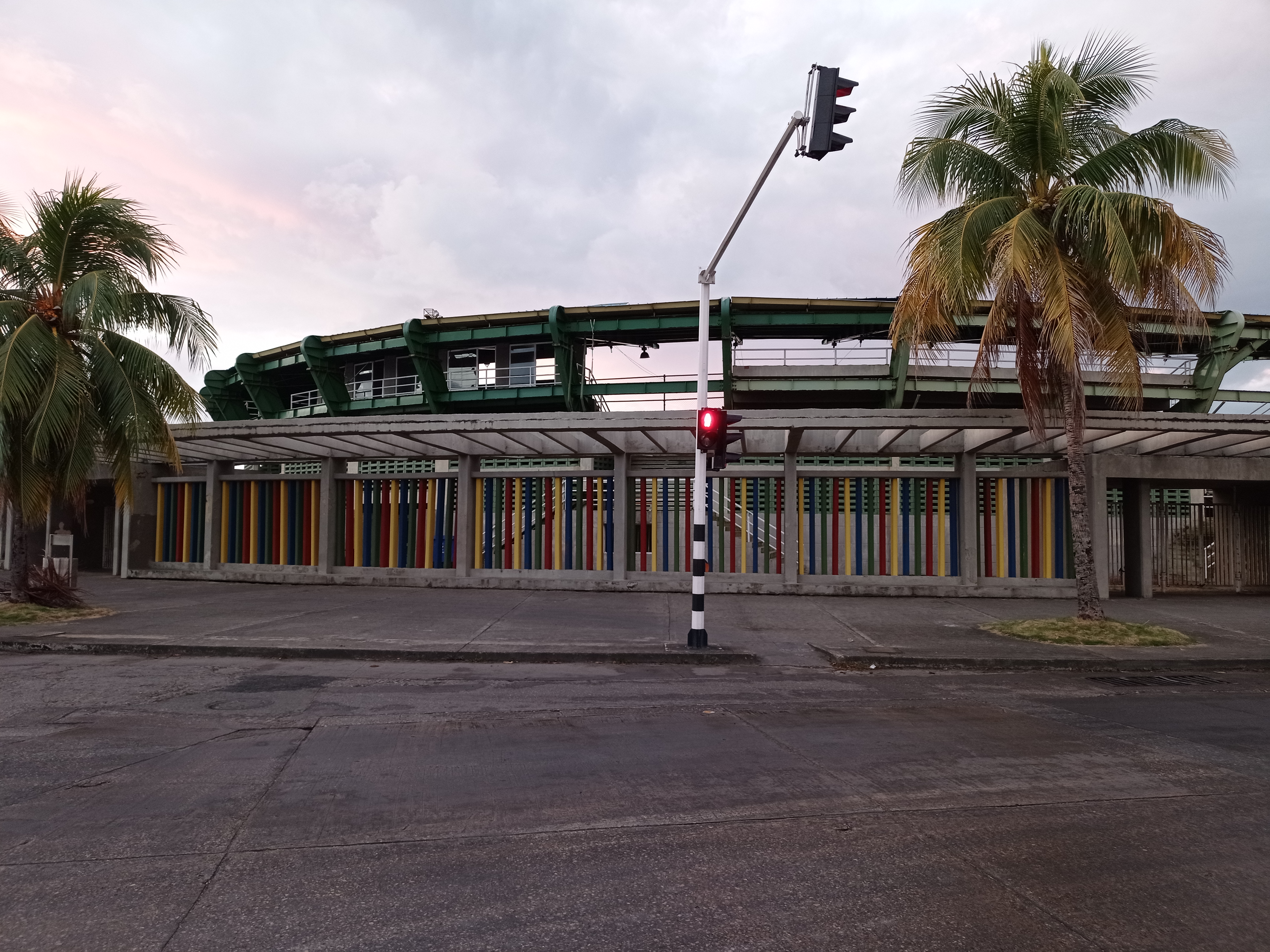
- Erwin O'Neil Stadium
- Interactive map of Erwin O'Neil Stadium
- Full name: Estadio de Fútbol Erwin O'Neil
- Location: San Andrés, Colombia
- Coordinates: 12°34′49″N 81°42′04″W
- Capacity: 5,000
- Surface: Artificial turf

Construction
- Opened: 2008

Tenants
- San Andrés FC; Real San Andrés (2019–2021)

Erwin O'Neil Stadium (Spanish: Estadio de Fútbol Erwin O'Neil) is an association football stadium located on the island of San Andrés, part of the Colombian department of the Archipelago of San Andrés, Providencia and Santa Catalina. The stadium, built in 2008, can seat up to 5,000 people and is home to San Andrés FC who play in who play in the Categoría Primera C, Colombia's third tier professional football league. 2014 edition of the Copa Claro tournament was kicked off in Erwin O'Neill Stadium.
