= Yuber Asprilla =

Colombian footballer (born 1992)

Personal information
- Full name: Yuber Alberto Asprilla Viera
- Date of birth: November 12, 1992 (age 33)
- Place of birth: Quibdó, Chocó, Colombia
- Height: 1.67 m (5 ft 6 in)
- Position: Forward

Team information
- Current team: Atlético Huila

Youth career
- 2009: Millonarios

Senior career*
Years	Team	Apps	(Gls)
2010–2014	Millonarios	34	(1)
2015	Once Caldas	2	(0)
2015–2016	Deportivo Pasto	17	(4)
2016–2017	La Equidad	15	(1)
2017	Envigado	16	(1)
2017	Alianza Petrolera	11	(1)
2018	Pumas UNAM	2	(0)
2018–2019	Atlético Bucaramanga	22	(2)
2020–2022	Atlético Huila	48	(12)
2022	Al-Najma (Manama)	?	(?)
2022	Al-Ittihad (Tripoli)	?	(?)
2022–2023	Jaguares de Córdoba	6	(0)
2024–	El Farolito	?	(?)
- * Club domestic league appearances and goals as of 2 Nov 2024

Yuber Asprilla born in Quibdó, Chocó, Colombia on 12 November 1992 is a football player, who plays as a forward.

Asprilla is a product of the Millonarios youth system and played with the Millonarios first team between February 2010 and 2014.

== Statistics (Official games/Colombian Ligue and Colombian Cup) ==
(As of November 14, 2010)

Year	Team	Colombian Ligue Matches	Goals	Colombian Cup Matches	Goals	Total Matches	2
2010	Millonarios	1	0	4	0	5	0
Total	Millonarios	1	0	4	0	5	0
