= Real Santander =

Colombian football club

- Full name: Club Deportivo Real Santander
- Nicknames: Albicelestes (White and Sky Blues)
- Founded: 17 January 2006; 20 years ago
- Ground: Villa Concha
- Capacity: 5,500
- President: Gustavo Núñez
- Head coach: Óscar Álvarez
- League: Categoría Primera B
- 2025: Primera B, 11th of 16
Home colours	Away colours	Third colours

Real Santander is a professional Colombian football team based in Bucaramanga, that currently plays in the Categoría Primera B. They play their home games at the Estadio Villa Concha in Piedecuesta, a municipality in the metropolitan area of Bucaramanga.

== History ==
=== Early years ===
The club was founded on 17 January 2006 in Floridablanca, Santander Department after the demise of Real Floridablanca eight years earlier. On 18 December 2006 they acquired the license (ficha) of Pumas de Casanare and became affiliated to DIMAYOR, entering Categoría Primera B, Colombia's second tier in 2007. After two seasons of unremarkable results, the albicelestes advanced to the Primera B's four-team semifinals (cuadrangulares semifinales) for the first time in their history in the 2009 Finalización tournament.

For the 2011 season, and due to the withdrawal of its main sponsors which in turn caused difficulties in making signings to strengthen the squad, Real Santander signed a cooperation agreement with Categoría Primera A club Atlético Nacional, which loaned seven players from its youth ranks. In that same year, the club narrowly missed out on the Finalización semi-finals after placing ninth in the first stage, but reached the quarter-finals of the Copa Colombia, where they were defeated by Atlético Nacional. The alliance with Atlético Nacional ended at the end of the year, and in 2015 Real Santander entered into another cooperation agreement with Deportivo Cali.

The club's best achievement in Primera B was a runner-up finish in the first tournament of the 2017 Categoría Primera B season, losing the double-legged final to Boyacá Chicó.

=== Relocation to San Andrés Island ===
Financial difficulties at their hometown forced the club to relocate the men's team to the Caribbean island of San Andrés in late 2018, being renamed as Real San Andrés and playing their home matches at Erwin O'Neil Stadium, becoming the first professional team from the islands, while their youth and women's teams remained behind in Floridablanca. In their first tournament after the relocation, the 2019 Apertura, they ended in 14th place, but in the Copa Colombia the team reached the round of 16 in the two seasons it played in San Andrés.

=== Return to Santander ===
Due to the COVID-19 pandemic and the multiple logistical drawbacks stemming from it ranging from lack of transportation to the islands to games behind closed doors and potentially scarce financial support from the local government, the agreement with the San Andrés and Providencia authorities was not renewed at the end of the 2020 season, and the men's team returned to the Santander Department for the 2021 Primera B season. Having been refused the use of Estadio Alfonso López in Bucaramanga by its main tenant Atlético Bucaramanga, they played their first games of the season at Estadio Daniel Villa Zapata in Barrancabermeja until the completion of the adaptation works of Estadio Villa Concha in Piedecuesta.

== Current squad ==
As of 29 January 2026

Note: Flags indicate national team as defined under FIFA eligibility rules; some limited exceptions apply. Players may hold more than one non-FIFA nationality.

No.	Pos.	Nation	Player
1	GK	COL	Kevin Chacón
2	DF	COL	Juan Fernando Solís
3	DF	COL	Camilo Durán
5	DF	COL	Andrés Ariza
6	MF	COL	Duván Felipe Ruiz
7	FW	COL	Juan David Rueda (captain)
9	FW	MEX	Santiago Rey
10	MF	COL	Fáiber Mendoza
11	FW	COL	Jorlan Liñán
12	GK	COL	Juan Lázaro
13	FW	COL	Johao Camacho
14	MF	COL	Juan García
16	MF	COL	Jordi Hernández
17	DF	COL	Santaigo Jiménez

No.	Pos.	Nation	Player
18	DF	COL	Samuel Orejuela
19	MF	COL	José Torres
20	MF	COL	José Ascanio
22	GK	COL	Jaime David Mora
25	FW	COL	Alex Santiago Segura
26	MF	COL	Jorge Pérez
27	MF	COL	Yojhan Neira
28	MF	COL	Oscar Padilla
31	MF	COL	Junior García
32	FW	COL	Juan Ararat
33	MF	COL	Luis Rangel
70	FW	COL	Santiago Ahumada
77	FW	COL	Yeison Castillo
80	MF	COL	Harlem Salas
99	FW	COL	Juan Guillén

== Managers ==
- (Colombia) Martín Peluffo (2008)
- (Colombia) Johan Meza (January 2009 – December 2011)
- (Argentina) Miguel González (January 2012 – January 2013)
- (Colombia) Víctor González (January 2013 – January 2018)
- (Colombia) Nicolás Herazo (February 2018 – December 2018)
- (Colombia) José García (January 2019 – December 2023)
- (Colombia) Óscar Álvarez (January 2024 – present)
