= Ruyery Blanco =

Colombian footballer (born 1998)

Personal information
- Full name: Ruyery Alfonso Blanco Yus
- Date of birth: 7 December 1998 (age 27)
- Place of birth: Santa Marta, Colombia
- Height: 1.79 m (5 ft 10 in)
- Position: Forward

Team information
- Current team: Unión Magdalena

Youth career
- Unión Magdalena

Senior career*
Years	Team	Apps	(Gls)
2016–2023	Unión Magdalena	74	(27)
2021–2022	→ Atlético Nacional (loan)	25	(2)
2023	→ Delfín (loan)	11	(0)
2024	Alianza	15	(0)
2024–2025	Unión Magdalena	25	(2)
2025–2026	PSBS Biak	23	(10)
2026–	Unión Magdalena	0	(0)
- * Club domestic league appearances and goals as of 11 April 2026

Ruyery Alfonso Blanco Yus (born 7 December 1998) is a Colombian professional footballer who plays as a forward for Unión Magdalena.

== Club career ==
Born in Santa Marta, Colombia, Blanco started off his career in the youth team of Unión Magdalena at the age of 16. He made his first team debut on 10 March 2016 as a substitute in a 2–4 win over Universitario Popayán, while also gaining experience in the professional team by competing in national youth tournament.

His debut in the top division occurred in 2019, when the team returned to the highest level. His league debut in the top flight came on 29 January 2019 against Atlético Huila, with Unión trailing 1–0. The head coach brought him on in the 86th minute for Abel Aguilar, and Blanco scored the equaliser two minutes later, ending the match in a draw.

On 4 July 2021, still owned by Unión Magdalena, Blanco signed with Atlético Nacional for an initial loan. He made his club debut on 25 September 2021, playing as a substitute in a 1–1 draw against Deportivo Pasto.

=== Move to Asia ===
In August 2025, Blanco was announced as a foreign signing for PSBS Biak ahead of the 2025–26 season Super League. On 18 August 2025, he made his league debut for PSBS Biak in a home match against Borneo Samarinda, which ended in a 0–1 loss. He was in the starting lineup and played the full 90 minutes. Five days later, he scored his first league goal in his second match against Persis Solo in a 2–2 draw. On 6 November 2025, Blanco scored equaliser in a 2–1 home win over Persita Tangerang.

== Honours ==
Atlético Nacional

- Categoría Primera A: Torneo Apertura 2022

Unión Magdalena

- Categoría Primera B: 2024
