= Estadio Guillermo Plazas Alcid =

Multi-purpose stadium in Neiva, Colombia

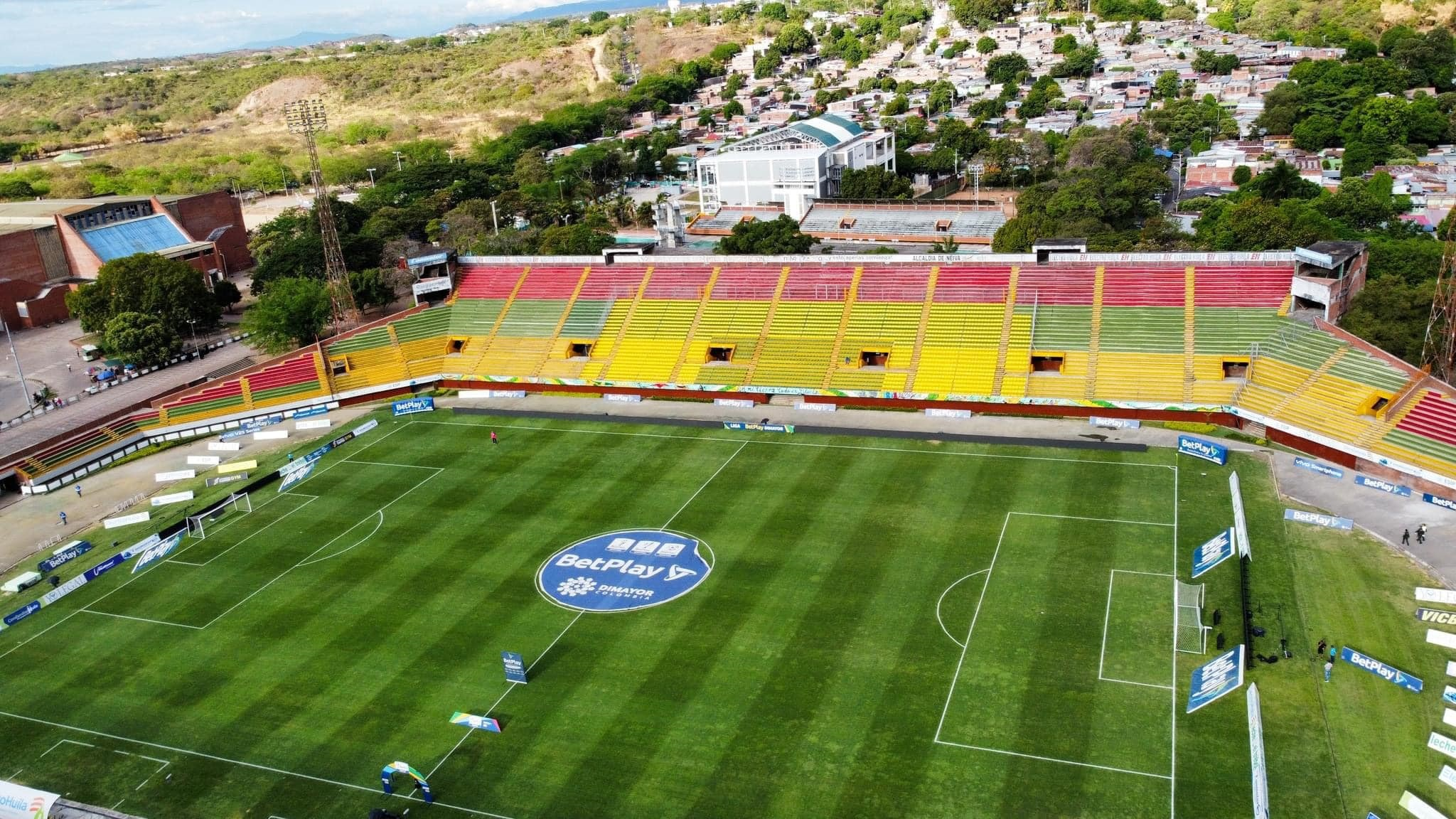
- View of stadium in 2024
- Interactive map of Estadio Guillermo Plazas Alcid
- Location: Neiva, Colombia
- Coordinates: 2.935824°N 75.280206°W
- Capacity: 12,000
- Surface: grass

Construction
- Opened: November 28, 1980
- Renovated: 2015–2023
- Reopened: 2023

Tenant
- Atlético Huila (1991–2025)

Estadio Guillermo Plazas Alcid is a multi-purpose stadium in Neiva, Colombia. It is currently used mostly for football matches. Built in 1980, the stadium has a capacity for 12,000 people. Atlético Huila played its home matches at this stadium.

The history of the stadium goes way back to the 1950s, when a group of young people decided to clean a minefield, in order to give it the shape of soccer field. This project lasted about a week, and ended up being called "The Desnucadero".

Nevertheless, it was until 1964 thanks to the famous brick march, led by the mayor elect of the time Guillermo Plazas Alcid and his right hand Senator Díaz Parra, in addition to which college students and citizens participated, that the idea of having a soccer stadium was taking shape. Construction was consolidated thanks to the donation of a piece of land in the La Libertad neighborhood by the Municipal Government for the designation of Neiva as the venue for the 1980 National Sports Games, and the stadium officially opened on 28 November 1980.

Its first renovation was between 1992 and 1995, which consisted of the creation of the east stand built under the term of governor Luis Enrique Ortiz.

In January 2015, works began on a $20 million renovation project, scheduled for completion by November 2016. However, on 19 August 2016, a fatal accident occurred when a slab of concrete fell, killing four and seriously wounding ten others. After that, construction was halted for almost five years. Construction finally resumed in August 2021, with the project scaled down to only focus on improvements to the pitch and to the Eastern stand, which had its capacity reduced due to safety concerns. The scaled down renovation was eventually finished in July 2023, with the Eastern stand ready to be used at full capacity of 12,000. However, this was only one stage of the renovation, with the Western stand still in very poor condition.

On 28 October 2025, the stadium was deemed unfit for professional football matches after an inspection carried out by the División Mayor del Fútbol Profesional Colombiano (Dimayor) and a technical evaluation conducted by the National University of Colombia found serious structural damage to the stadium's infrastructure. Given that the technical study recommended a major structural intervention, or failing that, the total demolition of the stands, and since there was a high risk of the stands collapsing onto the players' and referees' locker rooms, Dimayor banned the stadium for professional matches. The situation led its main tenant Atlético Huila to look for an alternate stadium to play their matches, and ultimately, to the club's departure from the city.
