= 2018 Copa Colombia =

Copa Águila 2018

Tournament details
- Country: Colombia
- Teams: 36

Final positions
- Champions: Atlético Nacional (4th title)
- Runners-up: Once Caldas
- Copa Libertadores: Atlético Nacional

Tournament statistics
- Matches played: 70
- Goals scored: 135 (1.93 per match)
- Top goal scorer(s): David Lemos; Michael Rangel; Ricardo Steer (3 goals each)

The 2018 Copa Colombia, officially the 2018 Copa Águila for sponsorship reasons, was the 16th edition of the Copa Colombia, the national cup competition for clubs of DIMAYOR. The tournament was contested by 36 teams. Junior were the defending champions, but were knocked out by Atlético Nacional in the quarterfinals. Atlético Nacional were the champions after beating Once Caldas 4–3 on aggregate in the final, and qualified for the 2019 Copa Libertadores.

== Format ==
For the 2018 season, the Copa Colombia had a change in its format. Unlike previous editions, there was no group stage and the competition was played in a single-elimination format in its entirety, with the 16 teams from the Categoría Primera B entering the first stage and being drawn into eight ties. After two stages, four Primera B teams qualified for the third stage, along with the twelve Categoría Primera A teams that did not enter international competition in the 2018 season, which entered the cup at that stage. Finally, in the round of 16, the eight third stage winners were joined by the four Copa Libertadores qualifiers (Atlético Nacional, Junior, Millonarios and Santa Fe), as well as the four Copa Sudamericana qualifiers (Independiente Medellín, América de Cali, Deportivo Cali, and Jaguares), which entered the competition at this point.

== First stage ==
The first stage was played by the 16 Categoría Primera B clubs, eight of which were seeded in the ties according to their position in the 2017 season aggregate table. The two relegated clubs from the Categoría Primera A (Cortuluá and Tigres) along with the remaining Primera B clubs were drawn into each tie. The seeded clubs hosted the second leg. The first legs were played on 21–22 February and 10 March 2018, while the second legs were played on 13 and 14 March 2018.

| Team 1 | Agg. | Team 2 | 1st leg | 2nd leg |
|---|---|---|---|---|
| Atlético | 0–2 | Cúcuta Deportivo | 0–1 | 0–1 |
| Fortaleza | 3–4 | Deportivo Pereira | 3–1 | 0–3 |
| Bogotá | 1–4 | Deportes Quindío | 1–1 | 0–3 |
| Unión Magdalena | 1–1 (5–6 p) | Llaneros | 0–0 | 1–1 |
| Tigres | 0–1 | Barranquilla | 0–0 | 0–1 |
| Universitario | 1–0 | Orsomarso | 1–0 | 0–0 |
| Cortuluá | 3–1 | Real Santander | 2–1 | 1–0 |
| Valledupar | 2–3 | Real Cartagena | 1–2 | 1–1 |

=== First leg ===
| 21 February 2018 | Universitario | 1–0 | Orsomarso | Popayán |
| 11:30 | Cuenú 47' (o.g.) | Report | | Stadium: Ciro López; Referee: Alexander Arias |

| 21 February 2018 | Bogotá | 1–1 | Deportes Quindío | Bogotá |
| 14:00 | Castillo 30' | Report | Cambindo 89' | Stadium: Metropolitano de Techo; Referee: Camilo Colmenares |

| 21 February 2018 | Valledupar | 1–2 | Real Cartagena | Valledupar |
| 19:45 | Herazo 89' | Report | González 38'; Murillo 73' (pen.) | Stadium: Armando Maestre Pavajeau; Referee: Alexander Ortíz |

| 22 February 2018 | Tigres | 0–0 | Barranquilla | Bogotá |
| 14:00 | | Report | | Stadium: Metropolitano de Techo; Referee: Cristian Guzmán |

| 22 February 2018 | Fortaleza | 3–1 | Deportivo Pereira | Cota |
| 14:30 | Acosta 22'; Alcarcel 55'; Chaves 75' | Report | Meléndez 77' | Stadium: Municipal de Cota; Referee: Yeison Garzón |

| 22 February 2018 | Cortuluá | 2–1 | Real Santander | Palmira |
| 16:00 | Mercado 12'; Mosquera 81' | Report | Castañeda 14' | Stadium: Francisco Rivera Escobar; Referee: Jeison Abril |

| 22 February 2018 | Atlético | 0–1 | Cúcuta Deportivo | Cali |
| 19:00 | | Report | Rangel 52' | Stadium: Pascual Guerrero; Referee: Esneider Pontón |

| 10 March 2018 | Unión Magdalena | 0–0 | Llaneros | Santa Marta |
| 15:15 | | Report | | Stadium: Sierra Nevada; Referee: Carlos Márquez |

=== Second leg ===
| 13 March 2018 | Barranquilla | 1–0 (1–0 agg.) | Tigres | Barranquilla |
| 15:00 | González 71' | Report | | Stadium: Metropolitano Roberto Meléndez; Referee: Gabriel Matorel |

| 13 March 2018 | Orsomarso | 0–0 (0–1 agg.) | Universitario | Palmira |
| 15:00 | | Report | | Stadium: Francisco Rivera Escobar; Referee: Héctor Rivera |

| 13 March 2018 | Real Cartagena | 1–1 (3–2 agg.) | Valledupar | Cartagena |
| 19:45 | Murillo 40' | Report | Rengifo 88' | Stadium: Jaime Morón León; Referee: Carlos García |

| 14 March 2018 | Deportivo Pereira | 3–0 (4–3 agg.) | Fortaleza | Pereira |
| 15:30 | Palomino 33'; Echeverri 40'; Mejía 60' | Report | | Stadium: Hernán Ramírez Villegas; Referee: Juan Roldán |

| 14 March 2018 | Deportes Quindío | 3–0 (4–1 agg.) | Bogotá | Armenia |
| 15:30 | Guerrero 16'; Carpintero 26'; Gómez 70' | Report | | Stadium: Centenario; Referee: Juan Pablo Alba |

| 14 March 2018 | Llaneros | 1–1 (1–1 agg.) (6–5 p) | Unión Magdalena | Villavicencio |
| 15:30 | Arias 16' | Report | Vega 51' | Stadium: Manuel Calle Lombana; Referee: Wilmer Gantiva |

| 14 March 2018 | Real Santander | 0–1 (1–3 agg.) | Cortuluá | Floridablanca |
| 18:00 | | Report | Sotero 67' | Stadium: Álvaro Gómez Hurtado; Referee: Wilmar Montaño |

| 14 March 2018 | Cúcuta Deportivo | 1–0 (2–0 agg.) | Atlético | Cúcuta |
| 20:00 | Caballero 38' | Report | | Stadium: General Santander; Referee: Fernando Acuña |

== Second stage ==
The second stage was played by the 8 first stage winners. In each tie, the clubs with the best performance after the first stage hosted the second leg. The first legs were played on 28–29 March and 12 April 2018, and the second legs were played on 11–12 and 26 April 2018.

| Team 1 | Agg. | Team 2 | 1st leg | 2nd leg |
|---|---|---|---|---|
| Real Cartagena | 1–3 | Cúcuta Deportivo | 0–1 | 1–2 |
| Deportivo Pereira | 4–1 | Cortuluá | 4–0 | 0–1 |
| Universitario | 2–3 | Deportes Quindío | 1–3 | 1–0 |
| Llaneros | 1–3 | Barranquilla | 0–1 | 1–2 |

=== First leg ===
| 28 March 2018 | Universitario | 1–3 | Deportes Quindío | Popayán |
| 11:30 | Torres 44' | Report | Carabalí 17'; Gómez 27'; Carpintero 66' (pen.) | Stadium: Ciro López; Referee: Liz Maír Suárez |

| 29 March 2018 | Llaneros | 0–1 | Barranquilla | Villavicencio |
| 15:00 | | Report | Colpa 52' | Stadium: Manuel Calle Lombana; Referee: Carlos Betancur |

| 29 March 2018 | Deportivo Pereira | 4–0 | Cortuluá | Pereira |
| 15:30 | Mena 20' (pen.); Castillo 30'; Cano 43'; Navarro 56' | Report | | Stadium: Hernán Ramírez Villegas; Referee: Jorge Guzmán |

| 12 April 2018 | Real Cartagena | 0–1 | Cúcuta Deportivo | Cartagena |
| 19:30 | | Report | Carrero 7' | Stadium: Jaime Morón León; Referee: Diego Rendón |

=== Second leg ===
| 11 April 2018 | Deportes Quindío | 0–1 (3–2 agg.) | Universitario | Armenia |
| 15:30 | | Report | Montaño 57' | Stadium: Centenario; Referee: Lisandro Castillo |

| 12 April 2018 | Barranquilla | 2–1 (3–1 agg.) | Llaneros | Barranquilla |
| 15:30 | Sarmiento 18'; Díaz 43' (pen.) | Report | Orozco 83' | Stadium: Metropolitano Roberto Meléndez; Referee: Never Manjarrés |

| 12 April 2018 | Cortuluá | 1–0 (1–4 agg.) | Deportivo Pereira | Cali |
| 18:00 | Sotero 87' | Report | | Stadium: Pascual Guerrero; Referee: Nicolás Rodríguez |

| 26 April 2018 | Cúcuta Deportivo | 2–1 (3–1 agg.) | Real Cartagena | Cúcuta |
| 19:45 | Carrero 48'; Caballero 74' | Report | Salcedo 32' | Stadium: General Santander; Referee: Leonard Mosquera |

== Third stage ==
The third stage was played by the four second stage winners and the 12 Categoría Primera A clubs that did not qualify for international competition, which were seeded in the ties according to their position in the 2017 season aggregate table. The two promoted clubs from the Categoría Primera B (Leones and Boyacá Chicó) were the last two seeded teams, with Leones taking the 11th position and Boyacá Chicó the 12th position. The four second stage winners as well as the best four teams according to the 2017 Primera A aggregate table hosted the second leg. The first legs were played on 2–3 and 9 May 2018, while the second legs were played on 9–10 and 16 May 2018.

}

| Team 1 | Agg. | Team 2 | 1st leg | 2nd leg |
|---|---|---|---|---|
| Boyacá Chicó | 4–3 | Cúcuta Deportivo | 2–1 | 2–2 |
| Leones | 3–3 (4–2 p) | Deportivo Pereira | 0–1 | 3–2 |
| Rionegro Águilas | 0–1 | Deportes Quindío | 0–1 | 0–0 |
| Once Caldas | 4–1 | Barranquilla | 2–0 | 2–1 |
| Envigado | 2–1 | Deportivo Pasto | 0–0 | 2–1 |
| Patriotas | 1–1 (4–3 p) | Deportes Tolima | 1–1 | 0–0 |
| Alianza Petrolera | 1–1 (4–5 p) | La Equidad | 1–1 | 0–0 |
| Atlético Huila | 3–4 | Atlético Bucaramanga | 1–0 | 2–4 |

=== First leg ===
| 2 May 2018 | Patriotas | 1–1 | Deportes Tolima | Tunja |
| 18:00 | Velásquez 16' | Report | Villa 90' | Stadium: La Independencia; Referee: Nicolás Rodríguez |

| 2 May 2018 | Once Caldas | 2–0 | Barranquilla | Manizales |
| 19:00 | Guzmán 72'; Vanegas 88' | Report | | Stadium: Palogrande; Referee: Óscar Gómez |

| 2 May 2018 | Alianza Petrolera | 1–1 | La Equidad | Barrancabermeja |
| 19:00 | Santa 53' | Report | Riquett 57' | Stadium: Daniel Villa Zapata; Referee: Carlos Ortega |

| 3 May 2018 | Leones | 0–1 | Deportivo Pereira | Itagüí |
| 15:00 | | Report | Cano 28' | Stadium: Metropolitano Ciudad de Itagüí; Referee: Harold Perilla |

| 3 May 2018 | Atlético Huila | 1–0 | Atlético Bucaramanga | Neiva |
| 18:00 | Boló 57' | Report | | Stadium: Guillermo Plazas Alcid; Referee: Diego Rendón |

| 3 May 2018 | Rionegro Águilas | 0–1 | Deportes Quindío | Rionegro |
| 19:00 | | Report | Sevillano 24' (pen.) | Stadium: Alberto Grisales; Referee: Jorge Guzmán |

| 3 May 2018 | Boyacá Chicó | 2–1 | Cúcuta Deportivo | Tunja |
| 20:00 | Romaña 38'; Canizales 60' | Report | Núñez 90' | Stadium: La Independencia; Referee: Never Manjarrés |

| 9 May 2018 | Envigado | 0–0 | Deportivo Pasto | Envigado |
| 16:00 | | Report | | Stadium: Polideportivo Sur; Referee: Never Manjarrés |

=== Second leg ===
| 9 May 2018 | Deportes Tolima | 0–0 (1–1 agg.) (3–4 p) | Patriotas | Ibagué |
| 19:30 | | Report | | Stadium: Manuel Murillo Toro; Referee: Jorge Duarte |

| 9 May 2018 | La Equidad | 0–0 (1–1 agg.) (5–4 p) | Alianza Petrolera | Bogotá |
| 19:30 | | Report | | Stadium: Metropolitano de Techo; Referee: Óscar Gómez |

| 9 May 2018 | Atlético Bucaramanga | 4–2 (4–3 agg.) | Atlético Huila | Bucaramanga |
| 20:00 | Mojica 47'; Rangel 52', 81', 90' | Report | Figueroa 66'; Amaya 71' | Stadium: Alfonso López; Referee: Nicolás Rodríguez |

| 10 May 2018 | Barranquilla | 1–2 (1–4 agg.) | Once Caldas | Barranquilla |
| 15:00 | Díaz 89' (pen.) | Report | Lemos 36', 69' | Stadium: Metropolitano Roberto Meléndez; Referee: Éder Vergara |

| 10 May 2018 | Deportes Quindío | 0–0 (1–0 agg.) | Rionegro Águilas | Armenia |
| 19:00 | | Report | | Stadium: Centenario; Referee: Lisandro Castillo |

| 10 May 2018 | Cúcuta Deportivo | 2–2 (3–4 agg.) | Boyacá Chicó | Cúcuta |
| 19:30 | Agudelo 47'; Castro 72' (pen.) | Report | Valdés 13'; Mena 58' | Stadium: General Santander; Referee: Harold Perilla |

| 10 May 2018 | Deportivo Pereira | 2–3 (3–3 agg.) (2–4 p) | Leones | Pereira |
| 19:45 | Echeverri 60'; Mena 85' | Report | Gómez 40' (pen.); Aguirre 45'; Jaramillo 53' | Stadium: Hernán Ramírez Villegas; Referee: Luis Fernando Trujillo |

| 16 May 2018 | Deportivo Pasto | 1–2 (1–2 agg.) | Envigado | Pasto |
| 20:00 | Rodríguez 15' | Report | Guzmán 48', 69' (pen.) | Stadium: Departamental Libertad; Referee: Nolberto Ararat |

== Final stages ==
Each tie in the final stages will be played in a home-and-away two-legged format. In each tie, the team with the better overall record up to that stage will host the second leg, except in the round of 16 where the third stage winners will host the second leg. The teams entering this stage will be the ones that qualified for the 2018 Copa Libertadores and 2018 Copa Sudamericana, and were drawn into each of the eight ties. In case of a tie in aggregate score, neither the away goals rule nor extra time are applied, and the tie is decided by a penalty shoot-out.

=== Bracket ===
Round of 16
Deportes Quindío | 0 | 1 | 1
Junior | 1 | 3 | 4
Patriotas | 0 | 0 | 0
Atlético Nacional | 1 | 1 | 2
La Equidad | 2 | 1 | 3
Deportivo Cali | 0 | 0 | 0
Leones (p) | 0 | 2 | 2 (4)
América de Cali | 2 | 0 | 2 (3)
Boyacá Chicó | 0 | 0 | 0
Millonarios | 2 | 2 | 4
Atlético Bucaramanga | 1 | 1 | 2 (5)
Jaguares (p) | 2 | 0 | 2 (6)
Once Caldas | 1 | 2 | 3
Independiente Medellín | 0 | 1 | 1
Envigado | 0 | 2 | 2
Santa Fe | 1 | 2 | 3

Quarterfinals
Junior | 0 | 0 | 0
Atlético Nacional | 1 | 0 | 1
La Equidad | 0 | 3 | 3 (2)
Leones (p) | 0 | 3 | 3 (4)
Millonarios (p) | 0 | 1 | 1 (3)
Jaguares | 0 | 1 | 1 (1)
Once Caldas (p) | 1 | 0 | 1 (6)
Santa Fe | 1 | 0 | 1 (5)

Semifinals
Atlético Nacional | 1 | 3 | 4
Leones | 0 | 1 | 1
Millonarios | 0 | 1 | 1
Once Caldas | 1 | 1 | 2

Final
Atlético Nacional | 2 | 2 | 4
Once Caldas | 2 | 1 | 3

=== Round of 16 ===
The third stage winners (Team 2) hosted the second leg. The first legs were played from 15 to 22 August, and the second legs were played from 21 to 30 August 2018.

| Team 1 | Agg. | Team 2 | 1st leg | 2nd leg |
|---|---|---|---|---|
| Millonarios | 4–0 | Boyacá Chicó | 2–0 | 2–0 |
| América de Cali | 2–2 (3–4 p) | Leones | 2–0 | 0–2 |
| Junior | 4–1 | Deportes Quindío | 1–0 | 3–1 |
| Independiente Medellín | 1–3 | Once Caldas | 0–1 | 1–2 |
| Santa Fe | 3–2 | Envigado | 1–0 | 2–2 |
| Atlético Nacional | 2–0 | Patriotas | 1–0 | 1–0 |
| Deportivo Cali | 0–3 | La Equidad | 0–2 | 0–1 |
| Jaguares | 2–2 (6–5 p) | Atlético Bucaramanga | 2–1 | 0–1 |

==== First leg ====
| 15 August 2018 | Jaguares | 2–1 | Atlético Bucaramanga | Montería |
| 19:30 | García 4'; Vogliotti 44' | Report | Vallecilla 90' | Stadium: Jaraguay; Referee: Jorge Tabares |

| 15 August 2018 | América de Cali | 2–0 | Leones | Cali |
| 19:30 | Aristeguieta 17', 70' | Report | | Stadium: Pascual Guerrero; Referee: Edilson Ariza |

| 15 August 2018 | Junior | 1–0 | Deportes Quindío | Barranquilla |
| 19:30 | Moreno 19' | Report | | Stadium: Romelio Martínez; Referee: Never Manjarrés |

| 15 August 2018 | Atlético Nacional | 1–0 | Patriotas | Medellín |
| 19:30 | Rivas 82' | Report | | Stadium: Atanasio Girardot; Referee: Jorge Duarte |

| 16 August 2018 | Santa Fe | 1–0 | Envigado | Bogotá |
| 19:00 | Moya 18' | Report | | Stadium: El Campín; Referee: Mauricio Mercado |

| 16 August 2018 | Independiente Medellín | 0–1 | Once Caldas | Medellín |
| 19:30 | | Report | Lemos 67' | Stadium: Atanasio Girardot; Referee: Lisandro Castillo |

| 16 August 2018 | Deportivo Cali | 0–2 | La Equidad | Palmira |
| 20:00 | | Report | Peralta 62', 78' (pen.) | Stadium: Deportivo Cali; Referee: Éder Vergara |

| 22 August 2018 | Millonarios | 2–0 | Boyacá Chicó | Bogotá |
| 19:30 | Palacios 8'; Salazar 10' | Report | | Stadium: El Campín; Referee: Edilson Ariza |

==== Second leg ====
| 21 August 2018 | Patriotas | 0–1 (0–2 agg.) | Atlético Nacional | Tunja |
| 19:30 | | Report | Lucumí 83' | Stadium: La Independencia; Referee: Andrés Rojas |

| 29 August 2018 | Envigado | 2–2 (2–3 agg.) | Santa Fe | Envigado |
| 15:30 | Rojas 24'; Vergara 71' | Report | Burbano 47', 67' | Stadium: Polideportivo Sur; Referee: Edilson Ariza |

| 29 August 2018 | Leones | 2–0 (2–2 agg.) (4–3 p) | América de Cali | Itagüí |
| 19:00 | Angulo 76', 80' | Report | | Stadium: Metropolitano Ciudad de Itagüí; Referee: Ricardo García |

| 29 August 2018 | Boyacá Chicó | 0–2 (0–4 agg.) | Millonarios | Tunja |
| 19:30 | | Report | Ovelar 13'; Carrillo 21' | Stadium: La Independencia; Referee: Jorge Duarte |

| 29 August 2018 | La Equidad | 1–0 (3–0 agg.) | Deportivo Cali | Bogotá |
| 19:30 | Quintero 37' (o.g.) | Report | | Stadium: Metropolitano de Techo; Referee: John Hinestroza |

| 30 August 2018 | Deportes Quindío | 1–3 (1–4 agg.) | Junior | Armenia |
| 19:00 | Figueroa 23' | Report | Serje 52'; González 75'; Sánchez 81' (pen.) | Stadium: Centenario; Referee: Luis Sánchez |

| 30 August 2018 | Once Caldas | 2–1 (3–1 agg.) | Independiente Medellín | Manizales |
| 19:30 | Perea 55'; Carreazo 90' | Report | Cano 2' | Stadium: Palogrande; Referee: Carlos Betancur |

| 30 August 2018 | Atlético Bucaramanga | 1–0 (2–2 agg.) (5–6 p) | Jaguares | Bucaramanga |
| 19:30 | Pernía 43' | Report | | Stadium: Alfonso López; Referee: Luis Fernando Trujillo |

=== Quarterfinals ===
Team 2 hosted the second leg. The first legs were played on 12 and 13 September 2018, and the second legs were played on 19 and 26 September 2018.

| Team 1 | Agg. | Team 2 | 1st leg | 2nd leg |
|---|---|---|---|---|
| Jaguares | 1–1 (1–3 p) | Millonarios | 0–0 | 1–1 |
| Leones | 3–3 (4–2 p) | La Equidad | 0–0 | 3–3 |
| Atlético Nacional | 1–0 | Junior | 1–0 | 0–0 |
| Santa Fe | 1–1 (5–6 p) | Once Caldas | 1–1 | 0–0 |

==== First leg ====
| 12 September 2018 | Jaguares | 0–0 | Millonarios | Montería |
| 19:00 | | Report | | Stadium: Jaraguay; Referee: Ricardo García |

| 12 September 2018 | Leones | 0–0 | La Equidad | Itagüí |
| 19:00 | | Report | | Stadium: Metropolitano Ciudad de Itagüí; Referee: Carlos Betancur |

| 12 September 2018 | Santa Fe | 1–1 | Once Caldas | Bogotá |
| 19:45 | Morelo 90' | Report | Nieto 52' | Stadium: El Campín; Referee: Éder Vergara |

| 13 September 2018 | Atlético Nacional | 1–0 | Junior | Medellín |
| 19:45 | Bocanegra 53' | Report | | Stadium: Atanasio Girardot; Referee: Gustavo Murillo |

==== Second leg ====
| 19 September 2018 | Junior | 0–0 (0–1 agg.) | Atlético Nacional | Barranquilla |
| 19:30 | | Report | | Stadium: Metropolitano Roberto Meléndez; Referee: Mario Herrera |

| 26 September 2018 | Once Caldas | 0–0 (1–1 agg.) (6–5 p) | Santa Fe | Manizales |
| 18:30 | | Report | | Stadium: Palogrande; Referee: Bismark Santiago |

| 26 September 2018 | La Equidad | 3–3 (3–3 agg.) (2–4 p) | Leones | Bogotá |
| 19:30 | Motta 47', 55'; Camacho 68' | Report | Rendón 15'; Otero 82', 90+3' | Stadium: Metropolitano de Techo; Referee: Nolberto Ararat |

| 26 September 2018 | Millonarios | 1–1 (1–1 agg.) (3–1 p) | Jaguares | Bogotá |
| 20:30 | Barreto 72' | Report | Roa 43' | Stadium: El Campín; Referee: Mario Herrera |

=== Semifinals ===
Team 2 will host the second leg. The first legs were played on 3 and 5 October, and the second legs were played on 11 and 12 October 2018.

| Team 1 | Agg. | Team 2 | 1st leg | 2nd leg |
|---|---|---|---|---|
| Once Caldas | 2–1 | Millonarios | 1–0 | 1–1 |
| Leones | 1–4 | Atlético Nacional | 0–1 | 1–3 |

==== First leg ====
| 3 October 2018 | Leones | 0–1 | Atlético Nacional | Itagüí |
| 19:30 | | Report | Moreno 4' | Stadium: Metropolitano Ciudad de Itagüí; Referee: John Hinestroza |

| 5 October 2018 | Once Caldas | 1–0 | Millonarios | Manizales |
| 19:45 | Steer 9' | Report | | Stadium: Palogrande; Referee: Nolberto Ararat |

==== Second leg ====
| 11 October 2018 | Atlético Nacional | 3–1 (4–1 agg.) | Leones | Medellín |
| 19:45 | Moreno 28'; Rivas 50'; J. Ramírez 79' | Report | Otero 73' | Stadium: Atanasio Girardot; Referee: Luis Sánchez |

| 12 October 2018 | Millonarios | 1–1 (1–2 agg.) | Once Caldas | Bogotá |
| 19:45 | Salazar 7' | Report | Amaya 33' (pen.) | Stadium: El Campín; Referee: Carlos Betancur |

=== Finals ===
24 October 2018
19:00

| Once Caldas | 2–2 | Atlético Nacional |
|---|---|---|
| Steer 41', 48' | Report | A. Ramírez 31', 78' |

Estadio Palogrande, Manizales
Referee: Carlos Betancur

1 November 2018
19:00

| Atlético Nacional | 2–1 | Once Caldas |
|---|---|---|
| Hernández 45+2'; Bocanegra 90+1' | Report | Carbonero 75' |

Estadio Atanasio Girardot, Medellín
Referee: Mario Herrera

Atlético Nacional won 4–3 on aggregate.

== Top goalscorers ==
As of 1 November 2018

| Rank | Name | Club | Goals |
|---|---|---|---|
| 1 | (Colombia) David Lemos | Once Caldas | 3 |
| 1 | (Colombia) Michael Rangel | Atlético Bucaramanga | 3 |
| 1 | (Colombia) Ricardo Steer | Once Caldas | 3 |
| 4 | (Venezuela) Fernando Aristeguieta | América de Cali | 2 |
| 4 | (Paraguay) Roque Caballero | Cúcuta Deportivo | 2 |
| 4 | (Colombia) Mateo Cano | Deportivo Pereira | 2 |
| 4 | (Colombia) Wilson Carpintero | Deportes Quindío | 2 |
| 4 | (Colombia) Darwin Carrero | Cúcuta Deportivo | 2 |
| 4 | (Colombia) Camilo Díaz | Barranquilla | 2 |
| 4 | (Colombia) Johan Gómez | Deportes Quindío | 2 |
| 4 | (Colombia) Yeison Guzmán | Envigado | 2 |
| 4 | (Brazil) Lucas Sotero | Cortuluá | 2 |
| 4 | (Colombia) Yorleys Mena | Deportivo Pereira | 2 |
| 4 | (Colombia) Miguel Antonio Murillo | Real Cartagena | 2 |
| 4 | (Colombia) Rafael Navarro | Deportivo Pereira | 2 |
| 4 | (Colombia) Carlos Peralta | La Equidad | 2 |
| 4 | (Argentina) Diego Sevillano | Deportes Quindío | 2 |

== See also ==
- 2018 Categoría Primera A season
- 2018 Categoría Primera B season
