= 2018 Categoría Primera B season =

Torneo Águila
- Season: 2018
- Dates: 10 February – 26 November 2018
- Champions: Cúcuta Deportivo (3rd title)
- Promoted: Cúcuta Deportivo; Unión Magdalena
- Matches: 266
- Goals: 645 (2.42 per match)
- Top goalscorer: Feiver Mercado (27 goals)
- Biggest home win: U. Magdalena 5–0 Dep. Quindío (12 August); Llaneros 5–0 Cortuluá (31 October)
- Biggest away win: Barranquilla 1–4 Real Santander (7 April); Universitario 0–3 U. Magdalena (6 May); Bogotá 0–3 Valledupar (12 May); Atlético 0–3 Cúcuta Deportivo (20 May); Bogotá 0–3 Fortaleza (11 August); Bogotá 0–3 U. Magdalena (8 September); Atlético 0–3 Tigres (10 September)
- Highest scoring: U. Magdalena 5–2 Universitario (30 September)

The 2018 Categoría Primera B season (officially known as the 2018 Torneo Águila season for sponsorship reasons) was the 29th season since its founding as Colombia's second division football league. The competition started on 10 February and concluded on 26 November. Cúcuta Deportivo were the champions by defeating Unión Magdalena 3–0 on aggregate score in the final. Both teams were also promoted to the Categoría Primera A.

== Format ==
For this season, the league returned to the 'one tournament per year' format. The season will consist of three stages. In the first stage, the 16 clubs played each other twice, once at home and once away. Similar to the 2018 Primera A season, the extra matches against a regional rival were not played. The top eight teams after the thirty rounds advanced to the semifinal round where they were sorted into two groups of four and played a double round-robin tournament group stage, with the top team of each group qualifying to the finals. The winner of the finals was crowned as the season champions and also earned promotion to the Categoría Primera A for the 2019 season. The season runner-up would have to play the best team in the aggregate table (other than the champion) on a home-and-away basis for the second promotion berth. In case the season runner-up also ended up as the best team in the aggregate table, it would also be promoted and the promotion play-off would not be played.

== Teams ==
16 teams took part, fourteen of them returning from last season plus Cortuluá and Tigres, who were relegated from the 2017 Primera A. The former will return to the second tier after 3 years while the latter returned after one season in the top flight. Both teams replaced Boyacá Chicó and Leones who earned promotion at the end of the last season.

Locations of the 2018 Categoría Primera B teams

Club	Home city	Stadium	Capacity
Atlético	Cali	Pascual Guerrero	33,130
Barranquilla	Barranquilla	Romelio Martínez^{a}	20,000
Bogotá	Bogotá	Metropolitano de Techo	8,000
Cortuluá	Tuluá	Doce de Octubre^{b}	16,000
Cúcuta Deportivo	Cúcuta	General Santander	42,901
Deportes Quindío	Armenia	Centenario	20,716
Deportivo Pereira	Pereira	Hernán Ramírez Villegas	30,297
Fortaleza	Cota	Municipal de Cota	4,000
Llaneros	Villavicencio	Manuel Calle Lombana	15,000
Orsomarso	Palmira	Francisco Rivera Escobar	9,000
Real Cartagena	Cartagena	Jaime Morón León	16,068
Real Santander	Floridablanca	Álvaro Gómez Hurtado	9,000
Tigres	Bogotá	Metropolitano de Techo	8,000
Unión Magdalena	Santa Marta	Sierra Nevada	16,000
Universitario	Popayán	Ciro López	5,000
Valledupar	Valledupar	Armando Maestre Pavajeau	11,000

a: Barranquilla used the Estadio Metropolitano Roberto Meléndez in Barranquilla as home stadium during the first half of the season.
b: Cortuluá used the Estadio Pascual Guerrero in Cali instead of the Estadio Doce de Octubre in Tuluá as home stadium during the first half of the season.

== First stage ==
=== Standings ===
Pos	Team	Pld	W	D	L	GF	GA	GD	Pts	Qualification
1	Cúcuta Deportivo	30	21	8	1	52	17	+35	71	Advance to the semifinals
2	Unión Magdalena	30	17	9	4	53	22	+31	60	Advance to the semifinals
3	Deportivo Pereira	30	15	8	7	43	31	+12	53	Advance to the semifinals
4	Real Cartagena	30	13	8	9	40	34	+6	47	Advance to the semifinals
5	Cortuluá	30	11	11	8	40	41	−1	44	Advance to the semifinals
6	Deportes Quindío	30	11	10	9	29	33	−4	43	Advance to the semifinals
7	Valledupar	30	10	11	9	40	38	+2	41	Advance to the semifinals
8	Llaneros	30	9	12	9	33	33	0	39	Advance to the semifinals
9	Fortaleza	30	9	11	10	39	38	+1	38	
10	Barranquilla	30	8	11	11	36	45	−9	35	
11	Tigres	30	7	13	10	30	35	−5	34	
12	Universitario	30	8	9	13	36	46	−10	33	
13	Bogotá	30	8	7	15	30	49	−19	31	
14	Atlético	30	7	8	15	29	42	−13	29	
15	Orsomarso	30	7	7	16	20	31	−11	28	
16	Real Santander	30	3	9	18	27	42	−15	18	

Source: Dimayor, Soccerway
Rules for classification: 1) Points, 2) Goal difference, 3) Goals for, 4) Away goals for, 5) Away goals against, 6) Drawing of lots

=== Results ===
Home \ Away	ATL	BAR	BOG	COR	CUC	QUI	PER	FOR	LLA	ORS	RCA	RSA	TIG	MAG	UPO	VAL
Atlético	—	1–1	0–1	0–0	0–3	3–3	2–3	0–1	1–0	0–0	2–0	2–1	0–3	1–2	1–2	1–1
Barranquilla	1–1	—	3–3	3–1	1–1	0–1	2–2	1–0	1–1	3–0	2–0	1–4	3–2	1–2	0–0	0–1
Bogotá	1–2	4–0	—	2–0	1–2	2–1	1–1	0–3	2–1	2–1	2–1	1–1	1–0	0–3	1–3	0–3
Cortuluá	1–1	1–2	3–2	—	1–2	2–1	3–2	1–0	0–0	1–0	0–2	2–0	0–1	1–1	4–2	2–1
Cúcuta Deportivo	3–1	1–1	3–0	3–0	—	3–1	2–1	1–1	2–1	4–0	1–1	1–0	1–1	1–0	3–0	1–0
Deportes Quindío	2–1	1–0	2–1	1–1	0–1	—	0–2	1–1	3–0	1–0	1–2	1–0	1–1	1–0	0–0	0–0
Deportivo Pereira	1–0	3–0	1–1	2–2	0–1	3–0	—	1–0	1–1	1–1	1–0	2–1	3–1	0–0	2–0	2–0
Fortaleza	0–0	3–3	0–0	1–1	0–0	1–0	1–2	—	1–1	1–0	1–2	2–0	3–2	2–2	2–1	2–2
Llaneros	2–1	0–1	1–1	1–1	1–2	1–2	2–0	2–1	—	2–1	1–1	2–2	1–0	2–1	1–0	3–1
Orsomarso	0–1	3–1	1–0	0–1	0–2	0–1	4–1	2–1	2–0	—	0–0	0–0	0–0	0–0	2–0	2–0
Real Cartagena	3–1	2–1	4–0	4–2	0–2	3–3	1–2	1–1	2–2	1–0	—	2–1	0–0	1–1	3–2	1–0
Real Santander	0–1	1–2	1–1	0–1	0–0	0–0	1–2	4–1	1–3	1–0	0–1	—	1–1	2–2	1–2	1–2
Tigres	0–2	1–1	1–0	1–2	0–0	0–1	1–0	1–3	1–1	1–0	2–1	1–1	—	0–0	1–0	2–2
Unión Magdalena	2–1	1–0	3–0	1–1	2–1	5–0	3–1	2–1	0–0	1–0	2–0	2–1	3–1	—	5–2	4–0
Universitario	3–2	0–0	2–0	2–2	1–2	0–0	0–0	1–3	1–0	3–0	0–1	3–1	1–1	0–3	—	2–2
Valledupar	2–0	4–1	2–0	2–2	2–3	0–0	0–1	3–1	0–0	1–1	1–0	1–0	3–3	1–0	3–3	—

Source: Dimayor, Soccerway
Legend: Blue = home team win; Yellow = draw; Red = away team win.

== Semifinals ==
The eight teams that advanced to the Semifinals were drawn into two groups of four teams. The winners of each group advanced to the finals.

=== Group A ===
Pos	Team	Pld	W	D	L	GF	GA	GD	Pts	Qualification	CUC	COR	LLA	RCA
1	Cúcuta Deportivo	6	4	1	1	9	3	+6	13	Advance to Finals	—	1–0	2–0	3–0
2	Cortuluá	6	3	0	3	8	9	−1	9		1–0	—	3–0	3–0
3	Llaneros	6	2	1	3	7	9	−2	7		1–1	5–0	—	1–0
4	Real Cartagena	6	2	0	4	7	10	−3	6		1–2	3–1	3–0	—

Source: Dimayor
Rules for classification: 1) Points, 2) First stage position.

=== Group B ===
Pos	Team	Pld	W	D	L	GF	GA	GD	Pts	Qualification	MAG	QUI	PER	VAL
1	Unión Magdalena	6	5	1	0	13	4	+9	16	Advance to Finals	—	2–1	3–0	2–0
2	Deportes Quindío	6	3	1	2	10	7	+3	10		1–1	—	1–2	1–0
3	Deportivo Pereira	6	3	0	3	10	10	0	9		2–3	1–3	—	4–0
4	Valledupar	6	0	0	6	1	13	−12	0		0–2	1–3	0–1	—

Source: Dimayor
Rules for classification: 1) Points, 2) First stage position.

== Finals ==
18 November 2018
15:15 UTC−5

Unión Magdalena	0–1	Cúcuta Deportivo
	Report	Núñez 90'

Estadio Sierra Nevada, Santa Marta
Referee: Mario Herrera

26 November 2018
19:30 UTC−5

Cúcuta Deportivo	2–0	Unión Magdalena
Agudelo 24'; Sinisterra 72'	Report

Estadio General Santander, Cúcuta
Referee: Nicolás Rodríguez

Cúcuta Deportivo won 3–0 on aggregate.

Torneo Águila
2018 champions

3rd title

== Aggregate table ==
Pos	Team	Pld	W	D	L	GF	GA	GD	Pts	Qualification
1	Cúcuta Deportivo (C, P)	38	27	9	2	64	20	+44	90	Promotion to Categoría Primera A
2	Unión Magdalena (P)	38	22	10	6	66	29	+37	76	Promotion to Categoría Primera A
3	Deportivo Pereira	36	18	8	10	53	41	+12	62	
4	Real Cartagena	36	15	8	13	47	44	+3	53	
5	Deportes Quindío	36	14	11	11	39	40	−1	53	
6	Cortuluá	36	14	11	11	48	50	−2	53	
7	Llaneros	36	11	13	12	40	42	−2	46	
8	Valledupar	36	10	11	15	41	51	−10	41	
9	Fortaleza	30	9	11	10	39	38	+1	38	
10	Barranquilla	30	8	11	11	36	45	−9	35	
11	Tigres	30	7	13	10	30	35	−5	34	
12	Universitario	30	8	9	13	36	46	−10	33	
13	Bogotá	30	8	7	15	30	49	−19	31	
14	Atlético	30	7	8	15	29	42	−13	29	
15	Orsomarso	30	7	7	16	20	31	−11	28	
16	Real Santander	30	3	9	18	27	42	−15	18	

Source: Dimayor
Rules for classification: 1) Points, 2) Goal difference, 3) Goals for, 4) Away goals for, 5) Away goals against, 6) Drawing of lots
(C) Champions; (P) Promoted

== Promotion play-off ==
Since the season runners-up Unión Magdalena also ended up as the best team in the aggregate table (other than the champions), they earned automatic promotion to the Categoría Primera A and the promotion play-off was not played.

== Top goalscorers ==
Rank	Name	Club	Goals
1	(Colombia) Feiver Mercado	Cortuluá	27
2	(Colombia) Ricardo Márquez	Unión Magdalena	20
3	(Colombia) Jonathan Agudelo	Cúcuta Deportivo	17
4	(Colombia) Diego Herazo	Valledupar	16
5	(Colombia) Wilson España	Universitario	12
6	(Colombia) Diego Echeverri	Deportivo Pereira	11
7	(Colombia) Néstor Arenas	Real Santander	10
7	(Colombia) Henry Castillo	Bogotá	10
7	(Colombia) Yorleys Mena	Deportivo Pereira	10
7	(Colombia) Jorge Obregón	Real Cartagena	10
7	(Colombia) Juan José Salcedo	Real Cartagena	10
7	(Colombia) Jhonier Viveros	Unión Magdalena	10

Source: Soccerway

== See also ==
- 2018 Categoría Primera A season
- 2018 Copa Colombia
