= 2015 Categoría Primera B season =

Torneo Águila
- Season: 2015
- Champions: Atlético Bucaramanga (2nd title)
- Promoted: 2015: Cortuluá, Cúcuta Deportivo; 2016: Atlético Bucaramanga, Fortaleza
- Relegated: None
- Top goalscorer: Ayron del Valle (29 goals)

The 2015 Categoría Primera B season (officially known as the 2015 Torneo Águila season for sponsorship reasons) was the 26th season since its founding.

== Format ==
16 teams competed in this Categoría Primera B season, a decrease from 18 in the last season due to the expansion of the Categoría Primera A to 20 teams starting from this season and the realization of a special promotion tournament to promote 2 additional teams to the Primera A at the start of the season. The Primera B tournament itself changed to a year-round competition with the 16 teams playing the other teams twice on a home-and-away basis and playing a regional rival twice more for a total of 32 matches. The top eight teams after the thirty-two rounds advanced to the Semifinal round where the eight teams were sorted into two groups of four and played a double Round-robin tournament group stage. Both group winners earned promotion to the Categoría Primera A and also advanced to the Final round, which consisted of two legs and decided the season winner.

== Teams ==
Locations of the 2015 Categoría Primera B teams

Club	Home city	Stadium	2014 season
América	Cali	Pascual Guerrero^{b}	5th
Atlético Bucaramanga	Bucaramanga	Alfonso López	3rd
Barranquilla	Barranquilla	Metropolitano	15th
Bogotá	Bogotá	Metropolitano de Techo	16th
Cortuluá^{a}	Tuluá	Doce de Octubre	13th
Cúcuta Deportivo^{a}	Cúcuta	General Santander	6th
Depor	Cali	Pascual Guerrero^{c}	18th
Deportes Quindío	Armenia	Centenario	2nd
Deportivo Pereira	Pereira	Hernán Ramírez Villegas	10th
Expreso Rojo	Zipaquirá	Municipal Los Zipas	17th
Fortaleza	Bogotá	Metropolitano de Techo	17th (Primera A)
Leones	Turbo	John Jairo Tréllez	4th
Llaneros	Villavicencio	Manuel Calle Lombana	8th
Real Cartagena	Cartagena	Jaime Morón León	9th
Real Santander	Floridablanca	Álvaro Gómez Hurtado	14th
Unión Magdalena	Santa Marta	Municipal de Ciénaga	7th
Universitario	Popayán	Ciro López	12th
Valledupar	Valledupar	Erasmo Camacho Calamar	11th

a: Only competed in the Promotion tournament.
b: América hosted their home games between February and August at Estadio Hernando Azcárate Martínez in Buga and Estadio de Techo in Bogotá due to the closure of the Estadio Pascual Guerrero for the 2015 IAAF World Youth Championships.
c: Depor hosted their home games between February and August at Estadio Cacique Jamundí in Jamundí due to the closure of the Estadio Pascual Guerrero for the 2015 IAAF World Youth Championships.

== Promotion tournament ==
The promotion tournament, which decided the two Primera B teams that would play in Categoría Primera A for its 2015 season was played from 14 to 21 January in Bogotá by DIMAYOR's eight "A-Class" associates that were in Categoría Primera B at the time. Those eight teams were split into two groups of four teams, where they played each team in their group once. Cúcuta Deportivo and Cortuluá finished on top of each group and earned promotion to the Categoría Primera A.

=== Group A ===
Pos	Team	Pld	W	D	L	GF	GA	GD	Pts	Promotion
1	Cúcuta Deportivo	3	2	1	0	8	3	+5	7	Promoted to Categoría Primera A
2	Deportes Quindío	3	2	1	0	6	4	+2	7	
3	Atlético Bucaramanga	2	0	0	2	0	3	−3	0	
4	Real Cartagena	2	0	0	2	1	5	−4	0	

Source: DIMAYOR
Rules for classification: 1) Points; 2) Goal difference; 3) Goals scored; 4) Goals conceded; 5) Head-to-head record between the involved teams; 6) 2014 Aggregate table position.
January 14, 2015
16:00 UTC−05:00

Deportes Quindío	1–0	Atlético Bucaramanga
Castillo 86'	Report

Estadio Metropolitano de Techo, Bogotá
Referee: Harold Perilla
January 14, 2015
20:00 UTC−05:00

Cúcuta Deportivo	3–0	Real Cartagena
Bedoya 16'; Lloreda 47'; Jiménez 76'	Report

Estadio Metropolitano de Techo, Bogotá
Referee: Wilmar Roldán

January 17, 2015
15:30 UTC−05:00

Real Cartagena	1–2	Deportes Quindío
Barreiro 90' (o.g.)	Report	Mosquera 49'; Carpintero 78'

Estadio Metropolitano de Techo, Bogotá
Referee: Óscar Gómez
January 17, 2015
20:00 UTC−05:00

Atlético Bucaramanga	0–2	Cúcuta Deportivo
	Report	Jiménez 41'; Marín 79'

Estadio Metropolitano de Techo, Bogotá
Referee: Nicolás Gallo

January 20, 2015
19:45 UTC−05:00

Cúcuta Deportivo	3–3	Deportes Quindío
Lazaga 22', 67'; Sosa 79'	Report	Galeano 35' (pen.); Barreiro 43', 87'

Estadio Metropolitano de Techo, Bogotá
Referee: Ulises Arrieta

Real Cartagena	Cancelled	Atlético Bucaramanga

Notes

1. The match between Real Cartagena and Atlético Bucaramanga was cancelled after both teams were eliminated from contention.

=== Group B ===
Pos	Team	Pld	W	D	L	GF	GA	GD	Pts	Promotion
1	Cortuluá	3	1	2	0	4	2	+2	5	Promoted to Categoría Primera A
2	Unión Magdalena	3	1	2	0	1	0	+1	5	
3	América	3	0	2	1	2	3	−1	2	
4	Deportivo Pereira	3	0	2	1	2	4	−2	2	

Source: DIMAYOR
Rules for classification: 1) Points; 2) Goal difference; 3) Goals scored; 4) Goals conceded; 5) Head-to-head record between the involved teams; 6) 2014 Aggregate table position.
January 15, 2015
16:00 UTC−05:00

Deportivo Pereira	0–0	Unión Magdalena
	Report

Estadio El Campín, Bogotá
Referee: Gustavo Murillo
January 15, 2015
20:15 UTC−05:00

América	1–1	Cortuluá
Mercado 52'	Report	Córdoba 58'

Estadio El Campín, Bogotá
Referee: Ímer Machado

January 18, 2015
15:30 UTC−05:00

Unión Magdalena	1–0	América
Salazar 74'	Report

Estadio El Campín, Bogotá
Referee: Wilson Lamouroux
January 18, 2015
19:30 UTC−05:00

Cortuluá	3–1	Deportivo Pereira
Ortíz 8', 27', 40'	Report	Giménez 80'

Estadio El Campín, Bogotá
Referee: Gustavo González

January 21, 2015
16:00 UTC−05:00

Deportivo Pereira	1–1	América
Giménez 85'	Report	Lasso 66'

Estadio El Campín, Bogotá
Referee: Leevan Suárez
January 21, 2015
19:45 UTC−05:00

Unión Magdalena	0–0	Cortuluá
	Report

Estadio El Campín, Bogotá
Referee: Wilmar Roldán

== Primera B tournament ==
=== First stage ===
==== Standings ====
Pos	Team	Pld	W	D	L	GF	GA	GD	Pts	Qualification
1	Atlético Bucaramanga	32	21	8	3	55	17	+38	71	Advanced to the semifinals
2	Deportivo Pereira	32	18	6	8	54	36	+18	60	Advanced to the semifinals
3	América	32	15	11	6	61	37	+24	56	Advanced to the semifinals
4	Fortaleza	32	13	12	7	41	35	+6	51	Advanced to the semifinals
5	Real Cartagena	32	15	5	12	46	43	+3	50	Advanced to the semifinals
6	Leones	32	15	5	12	33	36	−3	50	Advanced to the semifinals
7	Unión Magdalena	32	12	12	8	37	28	+9	48	Advanced to the semifinals
8	Universitario de Popayán	32	12	11	9	36	30	+6	47	Advanced to the semifinals
9	Deportes Quindío	32	12	9	11	43	36	+7	45	
10	Valledupar	32	10	8	14	38	45	−7	38	
11	Bogotá	32	9	7	16	30	44	−14	34	
12	Expreso Rojo	32	8	9	15	38	56	−18	33	
13	Real Santander	32	8	8	16	36	52	−16	32	
14	Barranquilla	32	7	10	15	23	37	−14	31	
15	Llaneros	32	7	9	16	33	51	−18	30	
16	Depor	32	6	6	20	37	58	−21	24	

Source: DIMAYOR
Rules for classification: 1) Points, 2) Goal difference, 3) Goals for, 4) Away goals for, 5) Away goals against, 6) Drawing of lots

==== Results ====
===== Regular matches =====
Home \ Away	AME	BAR	BOG	BUC	DEP	QUI	PER	EXP	FOR	LEO	LLA	RCA	RSA	MAG	UPO	VAL
América		3–0	3–0	2–2	3–1	2–2	1–2	4–1	1–1	3–1	2–1	3–0	1–0	1–1	1–1	3–0
Barranquilla	0–0		1–0	0–2	1–2	1–1	1–1	1–1	2–0	3–1	2–1	0–1	2–0	1–1	2–0	1–1
Bogotá	0–2	0–2		0–1	2–1	2–2	2–0	2–0	0–0	5–0	1–1	4–2	1–1	1–0	0–0	2–1
Atlético Bucaramanga	4–1	2–0	3–2		2–0	0–0	0–0	6–0	4–1	3–0	3–1	0–0	1–0	2–0	3–1	2–0
Depor	3–3	3–0	2–0	1–2		0–2	1–2	1–1	1–3	1–2	1–2	0–2	2–0	0–0	1–3	3–1
Deportes Quindío	0–2	1–0	0–1	0–3	1–3		2–3	3–0	1–1	0–0	2–1	2–0	4–0	2–1	1–1	2–1
Deportivo Pereira	2–0	2–0	2–0	1–2	3–2	1–0		5–1	2–2	2–0	2–0	2–0	2–1	3–0	0–0	3–0
Expreso Rojo	1–1	1–0	4–0	0–1	1–1	0–1	2–2		4–1	1–0	3–2	1–1	3–2	1–1	0–1	1–3
Fortaleza	3–1	2–0	1–0	2–1	3–0	1–0	1–1	0–0		0–0	2–0	1–0	2–1	2–1	2–0	2–1
Leones	4–3	1–0	3–0	0–1	1–0	1–0	2–0	3–2	2–0		1–0	2–0	2–1	2–1	0–0	2–1
Llaneros	0–0	0–0	0–1	1–1	2–1	1–4	2–1	2–3	2–1	0–2		3–2	1–2	1–0	1–1	1–1
Real Cartagena	1–2	3–3	4–0	2–0	3–2	0–1	2–3	2–1	2–2	2–0	3–0		1–1	0–2	1–0	3–2
Real Santander	0–5	0–0	3–2	0–2	3–1	2–2	2–3	3–0	1–1	3–1	0–1	0–1		0–0	2–0	3–2
Unión Magdalena	2–2	2–0	1–0	0–0	1–1	2–2	1–0	2–1	2–1	0–0	2–0	4–0	3–0		2–1	2–1
Universitario de Popayán	2–0	0–0	1–0	1–1	1–1	3–0 (Note: DIMAYOR awarded a 3–0 win in favor of Universitario de Popayán against Deportes Quindío after their game was suspended because of Quindío fans throwing objects at their team's players. The game was suspended with Universitario leading 2–1 after 85 minutes.)	3–2	3–2	2–0	2–0	2–2	1–2	3–1	1–0		1–2
Valledupar	1–1	1–0	1–0	0–1	3–0	1–0	1–0	1–0	1–1	1–0	3–3	1–2	3–3	1–1	1–0	

Updated to match(es) played on 2 November 2015. Source: DIMAYOR
Legend: Blue = home team win; Yellow = draw; Red = away team win.

===== Regional derbies (Rounds 8 & 24) =====
Round 8 (Derbies) - April 4, 5, and 6, 2015
Date	Time	Venue	Home	Score	Away
Sat.	15:00	Erasmo Camacho Calamar	Valledupar	1 – 2	Unión Magdalena
Sat.	15:00	Municipal Los Zipas	Expreso Rojo	1 – 1	Llaneros
Sun.	11:30	Ciro López	Universitario de Popayán	1 – 0	Leones
Sun.	15:00	Hernando Azcárate Martínez	América	3 – 0	Depor
Sun.	15:30	Jaime Morón León	Real Cartagena	2 – 0	Barranquilla
Mon.	18:30	Metropolitano de Techo	Fortaleza	2 – 2	Bogotá
Mon.	19:00	Álvaro Gómez Hurtado	Real Santander	0 – 0	Atlético Bucaramanga
Mon.	20:30	Hernán Ramírez Villegas	Deportivo Pereira	2 – 1	Deportes Quindío

Round 24 (Derbies) - August 29, 30, 31, and September 1, 2015
Date	Time	Venue	Home	Score	Away
Sat.	15:00	Metropolitano de Techo	Bogotá	0 – 0	Fortaleza
Sun.	15:00	Municipal de Ciénaga	Unión Magdalena	0 – 0	Valledupar
Sun.	15:00	John Jairo Tréllez	Leones	0 – 0	Universitario de Popayán
Sun.	15:30	Pascual Guerrero	Depor	1 – 2	América
Sun.	15:30	Alfonso López	Atlético Bucaramanga	0 – 1	Real Santander
Sun.	15:30	Manuel Calle Lombana	Llaneros	0 – 1	Expreso Rojo
Mon.	18:00	Metropolitano Roberto Meléndez	Barranquilla	0 – 2	Real Cartagena
Tue.	20:00	Centenario	Deportes Quindío	4 – 0	Deportivo Pereira

=== Semifinals ===
The Semifinal stage began on 8 November and ended on 30 November. The eight teams that advanced from the first round were sorted into two groups of four teams. Atlético Bucaramanga and Fortaleza topped their groups, advancing to the finals and being also promoted to the Categoría Primera A for the 2016 season.

==== Group A ====
Pos	Team	Pld	W	D	L	GF	GA	GD	Pts	Qualification	BUC	AME	RCA	UPO
1	Atlético Bucaramanga	6	4	1	1	10	3	+7	13	Finals and promotion to Categoría Primera A	—	1–1	3–0	1–0
2	América	6	3	1	2	12	9	+3	10		0–1	—	3–1	3–2
3	Real Cartagena	6	2	1	3	7	12	−5	7		0–3	2–1	—	3–1
4	Universitario de Popayán	6	1	1	4	8	13	−5	4		2–1	2–4	1–1	—

Source: DIMAYOR
Rules for classification: 1) Points, 2) First stage position

==== Group B ====
Pos	Team	Pld	W	D	L	GF	GA	GD	Pts	Qualification	FOR	PER	LEO	MAG
1	Fortaleza	6	5	0	1	14	7	+7	15	Finals and promotion to Categoría Primera A	—	3–1	3–0	3–2
2	Deportivo Pereira	6	4	1	1	12	5	+7	13		4–0	—	1–0	3–0
3	Leones	6	1	1	4	5	10	−5	4		0–3	1–1	—	1–2
4	Unión Magdalena	6	1	0	5	5	14	−9	3		0–2	1–2	0–3 (Note: DIMAYOR awarded a 3–0 away win in favor of Leones for Unión Magdalena fielding an unauthorized player. Original result was a 3–0 win for Unión Magdalena.)	—

Source: DIMAYOR
Rules for classification: 1) Points, 2) First stage position

=== Finals ===
December 6, 2015
15:00 UTC−05:00

Fortaleza	0–2	Atlético Bucaramanga
		Cataño 56', 59'

Estadio Metropolitano de Techo, Bogotá
Referee: Leonard Mosquera

December 12, 2015
19:30 UTC−05:00

Atlético Bucaramanga	0–0	Fortaleza

Estadio Alfonso López, Bucaramanga
Referee: Jorge Guzmán

Torneo Águila
2015 champion
Atlético Bucaramanga
2nd title

=== Top goalscorers ===
Rank	Name	Club	Goals
1	(Colombia) Ayron del Valle	América	29
2	(Colombia) Leonardo Castro	Deportivo Pereira	18
3	(Colombia) Carlos Peralta	Unión Magdalena	17
4	(Argentina) Ernesto Farías	América	14
4	(Colombia) Edis Ibargüen	Fortaleza	14

Source: DIMAYOR

=== Aggregate table ===
Pos	Team	Pld	W	D	L	GF	GA	GD	Pts	Promotion
1	Atlético Bucaramanga (C)	40	26	10	4	67	20	+47	88	Promotion to Categoría Primera A
2	Deportivo Pereira	38	22	7	9	66	41	+25	73	
3	Fortaleza	40	18	13	9	55	44	+11	67	Promotion to Categoría Primera A
4	América	38	18	12	8	73	46	+27	66	
5	Real Cartagena	38	17	6	15	53	55	−2	57	
6	Leones	38	16	6	16	38	46	−8	54	
7	Universitario de Popayán	38	13	12	13	44	43	+1	51	
8	Unión Magdalena	38	13	12	13	42	42	0	51	
9	Deportes Quindío	32	12	9	11	43	36	+7	45	
10	Valledupar	32	10	8	14	38	45	−7	38	
11	Bogotá	32	9	7	16	30	44	−14	34	
12	Expreso Rojo	32	8	9	15	38	56	−18	33	
13	Real Santander	32	8	8	16	36	52	−16	32	
14	Barranquilla	32	7	10	15	23	37	−14	31	
15	Llaneros	32	7	9	16	33	51	−18	30	
16	Depor	32	6	6	20	37	58	−21	24	

Source: DIMAYOR
Rules for classification: 1) Points, 2) Goal difference, 3) Goals for, 4) Away goals for, 5) Away goals against, 6) Drawing of lots
(C) Champions
