= 2016 Categoría Primera B season =

Torneo Águila
- Season: 2016
- Champions: América de Cali (1st title)
- Promoted: América de Cali; Tigres
- Top goalscorer: Juan Camilo Hernández (21 goals)

The 2016 Categoría Primera B season (officially known as the 2016 Torneo Águila season for sponsorship reasons) was the 27th season since its founding.

== Format ==
The league retained the format used in the most recent season. The tournament was played in a year-round competition with the 16 teams playing the other teams twice on a home-and-away basis and playing a regional rival twice more for a total of 32 matches. The top eight teams after the thirty-two rounds advanced to the Semifinal round where the eight teams were sorted into two groups of four and played a double Round-robin tournament group stage. Both group winners earn promotion to the Categoría Primera A and also advanced to the Final round, which consisted of two legs to decide the winner.

== Teams ==
Locations of the 2016 Categoría Primera B teams

| Club | Home city | Stadium | 2015 season |
|---|---|---|---|
| América de Cali | Cali | Pascual Guerrero | 4th |
| Atlético^{a} | Cali | Pascual Guerrero | 16th |
| Barranquilla | Barranquilla | Metropolitano | 14th |
| Bogotá | Bogotá | Metropolitano de Techo | 11th |
| Cúcuta Deportivo | Cúcuta | General Santander | 20th (Primera A) |
| Deportes Quindío | Armenia | Centenario | 9th |
| Deportivo Pereira | Pereira | Hernán Ramírez Villegas | 2nd |
| Leones | Turbo; Itagüí^{b} | John Jairo Tréllez; Metropolitano Ciudad de Itagüí | 6th |
| Llaneros | Villavicencio | Manuel Calle Lombana | 15th |
| Orsomarso | Palmira | Francisco Rivera Escobar | Did not compete |
| Real Cartagena | Cartagena | Jaime Morón León | 5th |
| Real Santander | Floridablanca | Álvaro Gómez Hurtado | 13th |
| Tigres^{c} | Bogotá | Luis Carlos Galán Sarmiento | 12th |
| Unión Magdalena | Santa Marta | Federico Serrano Soto; Municipal de Ciénaga | 8th |
| Universitario | Popayán | Ciro López | 7th |
| Valledupar | Valledupar | Armando Maestre Pavajeau | 10th |

a: Formerly known as Dépor.
b: Played at Polideportivo Sur in Envigado for most of the second half of the season.
c: Formerly known as Expreso Rojo.

== First stage ==
=== Standings ===
| Pos | Team | Pld | W | D | L | GF | GA | GD | Pts | Qualification |
|---|---|---|---|---|---|---|---|---|---|---|
| 1 | Deportivo Pereira | 32 | 22 | 4 | 6 | 58 | 28 | +30 | 70 | Advance to the semifinals |
| 2 | América de Cali | 32 | 16 | 12 | 4 | 48 | 24 | +24 | 60 | Advance to the semifinals |
| 3 | Real Cartagena | 32 | 16 | 9 | 7 | 47 | 36 | +11 | 57 | Advance to the semifinals |
| 4 | Leones | 32 | 14 | 7 | 11 | 43 | 31 | +12 | 49 | Advance to the semifinals |
| 5 | Universitario de Popayán | 32 | 14 | 7 | 11 | 37 | 35 | +2 | 49 | Advance to the semifinals |
| 6 | Tigres | 32 | 12 | 12 | 8 | 26 | 24 | +2 | 48 | Advance to the semifinals |
| 7 | Deportes Quindío | 32 | 13 | 5 | 14 | 36 | 33 | +3 | 44 | Advance to the semifinals |
| 8 | Bogotá | 32 | 12 | 8 | 12 | 37 | 39 | −2 | 44 | Advance to the semifinals |
| 9 | Valledupar | 32 | 13 | 5 | 14 | 34 | 37 | −3 | 44 | |
| 10 | Cúcuta Deportivo | 32 | 11 | 9 | 12 | 35 | 31 | +4 | 42 | |
| 11 | Orsomarso | 32 | 11 | 7 | 14 | 35 | 48 | −13 | 40 | |
| 12 | Barranquilla | 32 | 9 | 8 | 15 | 31 | 37 | −6 | 35 | |
| 13 | Unión Magdalena | 32 | 9 | 8 | 15 | 30 | 39 | −9 | 35 | |
| 14 | Real Santander | 32 | 9 | 6 | 17 | 33 | 51 | −18 | 33 | |
| 15 | Llaneros | 32 | 7 | 10 | 15 | 31 | 42 | −11 | 31 | |
| 16 | Atlético | 32 | 6 | 7 | 19 | 19 | 45 | −26 | 25 | |

Source: DIMAYOR
Rules for classification: 1) Points, 2) Goal difference, 3) Goals for, 4) Away goals for, 5) Away goals against, 6) Drawing of lots

=== Results ===
==== Regular matches ====
| Home \ Away | AME | ATL | BAR | BOG | CUC | QUI | PER | LEO | LLA | ORS | RCA | RSA | TIG | MAG | UPO | VAL |
|---|---|---|---|---|---|---|---|---|---|---|---|---|---|---|---|---|
| América de Cali | | 0–0 | 1–0 | 4–2 | 1–1 | 2–0 | 1–1 | 2–0 | 2–2 | 0–0 | 1–0 | 1–0 | 2–1 | 1–0 | 2–2 | 3–1 |
| Atlético | 0–2 | | 1–1 | 0–1 | 0–0 | 1–0 | 1–2 | 1–1 | 1–2 | 1–0 | 0–1 | 1–0 | 1–0 | 1–1 | 0–1 | 0–1 |
| Barranquilla | 0–0 | 1–0 | | 1–0 | 2–1 | 1–2 | 1–2 | 2–1 | 3–0 | 3–0 | 2–2 | 1–1 | 0–2 | 0–1 | 1–1 | 0–1 |
| Bogotá | 1–0 | 1–0 | 0–0 | | 1–2 | 1–0 | 0–1 | 1–4 | 3–2 | 4–1 | 0–0 | 2–0 | 2–0 | 4–0 | 1–1 | 0–1 |
| Cúcuta Deportivo | 2–0 | 2–1 | 2–0 | 1–1 | | 1–0 | 2–1 | 2–1 | 0–0 | 1–1 | 1–1 | 1–0 | 2–0 | 1–1 | 1–1 | 3–0 |
| Deportes Quindío | 0–1 | 2–1 | 2–0 | 1–3 | 2–1 | | 1–0 | 0–0 | 1–0 | 3–2 | 0–2 | 0–1 | 1–2 | 3–1 | 0–0 | 1–0 |
| Deportivo Pereira | 1–0 | 7–2 | 4–0 | 4–0 | 1–0 | 1–0 | | 1–0 | 1–1 | 4–1 | 2–1 | 1–0 | 3–0 | 2–1 | 1–0 | 2–1 |
| Leones | 0–0 | 2–1 | 1–0 | 3–0 | 1–0 | 0–0 | 1–1 | | 3–0 | 0–2 | 4–0 | 3–0 | 2–1 | 2–0 | 0–1 | 1–0 |
| Llaneros | 1–1 | 1–2 | 1–2 | 3–1 | 1–0 | 2–1 | 4–3 | 2–3 | | 1–2 | 1–0 | 0–1 | 0–1 | 1–1 | 1–0 | 0–1 |
| Orsomarso | 1–5 | 0–1 | 1–0 | 1–0 | 3–1 | 2–1 | 0–2 | 2–0 | 1–1 | | 0–0 | 6–2 | 0–0 | 2–1 | 1–3 | 1–0 |
| Real Cartagena | 2–2 | 2–0 | 2–1 | 3–1 | 2–1 | 2–2 | 1–3 | 1–0 | 2–1 | 1–1 | | 4–1 | 2–1 | 2–0 | 4–2 | 0–3 |
| Real Santander | 1–1 | 1–1 | 0–2 | 1–2 | 2–1 | 1–5 | 3–0 | 2–1 | 1–1 | 4–0 | 1–2 | | 2–0 | 1–1 | 0–1 | 1–3 |
| Tigres | 1–1 | 0–0 | 1–0 | 3–2 | 1–0 | 0–0 | 1–1 | 1–0 | 0–0 | 2–0 | 0–0 | 2–0 | | 0–0 | 1–0 | 1–0 |
| Unión Magdalena | 1–2 | 1–0 | 1–1 | 0–0 | 1–0 | 2–1 | 0–1 | 3–4 | 1–0 | 0–2 | 2–0 | 1–2 | 0–0 | | 0–1 | 3–0 |
| Universitario de Popayán | 0–1 | 1–0 | 1–3 | 0–1 | 1–3 | 0–2 | 2–1 | 2–1 | 1–0 | 1–0 | 1–3 | 3–1 | 2–3 | 2–0 | | 2–1 |
| Valledupar | 3–0 | 2–1 | 2–1 | 1–1 | 2–1 | 0–2 | 0–1 | 1–1 | 0–0 | 3–1 | 0–2 | 3–1 | 0–0 | 1–2 | 1–1 | |

Updated to match(es) played on 17 October 2016. Source: DIMAYOR
Legend: Blue = home team win; Yellow = draw; Red = away team win.

==== Regional derbies (Rounds 8 & 24) ====
Round 8 (Derbies) - April 2, 3, 4, and 5, 2016
| Date | Time | Venue | Home | Score | Away |
|---|---|---|---|---|---|
| Sat. | 14:00 | Metropolitano de Techo | Tigres | 1 – 1 | Bogotá |
| Sat. | 15:00 | Federico Serrano Soto | Unión Magdalena | 3 – 0 | Valledupar |
| Sun. | 11:30 | Ciro López | Universitario de Popayán | 2 – 0 | Orsomarso |
| Sun. | 15:00 | Álvaro Gómez Hurtado | Real Santander | 0 – 0 | Cúcuta Deportivo |
| Sun. | 15:30 | Manuel Calle Lombana | Llaneros | 1 – 1 | Leones |
| Sun. | 15:30 | Jaime Morón León | Real Cartagena | 2 – 1 | Barranquilla |
| Mon. | 19:45 | Pascual Guerrero | Atlético | 0 – 4 | América de Cali |
| Tue. | 20:00 | Centenario | Deportes Quindío | 1 – 2 | Deportivo Pereira |

Round 24 (Derbies) - August 20, 21, 22, and 23, 2016
| Date | Time | Venue | Home | Score | Away |
|---|---|---|---|---|---|
| Sat. | 15:00 | Armando Maestre Pavajeau | Valledupar | 2 – 1 | Unión Magdalena |
| Sat. | 15:00 | Polideportivo Sur | Leones | 2 – 1 | Llaneros |
| Sat. | 15:00 | Francisco Rivera Escobar | Orsomarso | 1 – 1 | Universitario de Popayán |
| Sun. | 15:00 | Metropolitano Roberto Meléndez | Barranquilla | 1 – 1 | Real Cartagena |
| Sun. | 15:30 | General Santander | Cúcuta Deportivo | 1 – 2 | Real Santander |
| Mon. | 14:00 | Metropolitano de Techo | Bogotá | 0 – 0 | Tigres |
| Mon. | 19:45 | Pascual Guerrero | América de Cali | 5 – 0 | Atlético |
| Tue. | 19:45 | Hernán Ramírez Villegas | Deportivo Pereira | 1 – 2 | Deportes Quindío |

== Semifinals ==
The Semifinal stage began on October 22 and ended on November 28. The eight teams that advanced were sorted into two groups of four teams. Tigres and América de Cali topped their respective groups and as a result both advanced to the finals and were also promoted to the Categoría Primera A for the 2017 season.

=== Group A ===
| Pos | Team | Pld | W | D | L | GF | GA | GD | Pts | Qualification | TIG | PER | LEO | BOG |
|---|---|---|---|---|---|---|---|---|---|---|---|---|---|---|
| 1 | Tigres | 6 | 3 | 2 | 1 | 5 | 4 | +1 | 11 | Finals and promotion to Categoría Primera A | — | 0–2 | 2–1 | 1–0 |
| 2 | Deportivo Pereira | 6 | 2 | 3 | 1 | 10 | 6 | +4 | 9 | | 0–0 | — | 2–2 | 3–0 |
| 3 | Leones | 6 | 2 | 3 | 1 | 12 | 10 | +2 | 9 | | 1–1 | 2–2 | — | 3–1 |
| 4 | Bogotá | 6 | 1 | 0 | 5 | 5 | 12 | −7 | 3 | | 0–1 | 2–1 | 2–3 | — |

Source: DIMAYOR
Rules for classification: 1) Points, 2) First stage position

=== Group B ===
| Pos | Team | Pld | W | D | L | GF | GA | GD | Pts | Qualification | AME | QUI | RCA | UPO |
|---|---|---|---|---|---|---|---|---|---|---|---|---|---|---|
| 1 | América de Cali | 6 | 4 | 1 | 1 | 9 | 4 | +5 | 13 | Finals and promotion to Categoría Primera A | — | 2–1 | 2–1 | 2–0 |
| 2 | Deportes Quindío | 6 | 3 | 2 | 1 | 9 | 6 | +3 | 11 | | 1–0 | — | 3–1 | 1–0 |
| 3 | Real Cartagena | 6 | 1 | 2 | 3 | 6 | 10 | −4 | 5 | | 0–2 | 2–2 | — | 1–0 |
| 4 | Universitario de Popayán | 6 | 0 | 3 | 3 | 3 | 7 | −4 | 3 | | 1–1 | 1–1 | 1–1 | — |

Source: DIMAYOR
Rules for classification: 1) Points, 2) First stage position

== Finals ==
5 December 2016
19:30 UTC−5

| Tigres | 0–2 | América de Cali |
|---|---|---|
| | Report | Lasso 34' (o.g.); Vásquez 43' |

Estadio Metropolitano de Techo, Bogotá
Referee: Bismark Santiago

10 December 2016
19:00 UTC−5

| América de Cali | 3–1 | Tigres |
|---|---|---|
| Angulo 24', 52'; Martínez Borja 45' | Report | Rivera 72' |

Estadio Pascual Guerrero, Cali
Referee: Jorge Guzmán

Torneo Águila
2016 champion

1st title

== Top goalscorers ==
| Rank | Name | Club | Goals |
|---|---|---|---|
| 1 | (Colombia) Juan Camilo Hernández | Deportivo Pereira | 21 |
| 2 | (Colombia) Jairo Molina | Bogotá | 17 |
| 3 | (Colombia) Damir Ceter | Deportes Quindío | 14 |
| 4 | (Colombia) Martín Arzuaga | Real Cartagena | 13 |
| 4 | (Argentina) Ernesto Farías | América de Cali | 13 |

Source: DIMAYOR

== Aggregate table ==
| Pos | Team | Pld | W | D | L | GF | GA | GD | Pts | Promotion |
|---|---|---|---|---|---|---|---|---|---|---|
| 1 | Deportivo Pereira | 38 | 24 | 7 | 7 | 68 | 34 | +34 | 79 | |
| 2 | América de Cali (C) | 40 | 22 | 13 | 5 | 62 | 29 | +33 | 79 | Promotion to Categoría Primera A |
| 3 | Real Cartagena | 38 | 17 | 11 | 10 | 53 | 46 | +7 | 62 | |
| 4 | Tigres | 40 | 15 | 14 | 11 | 32 | 33 | −1 | 59 | Promotion to Categoría Primera A |
| 5 | Leones | 38 | 16 | 10 | 12 | 55 | 41 | +14 | 58 | |
| 6 | Deportes Quindío | 38 | 16 | 7 | 15 | 45 | 39 | +6 | 55 | |
| 7 | Universitario de Popayán | 38 | 14 | 10 | 14 | 40 | 42 | −2 | 52 | |
| 8 | Bogotá | 38 | 13 | 8 | 17 | 42 | 51 | −9 | 47 | |
| 9 | Valledupar | 32 | 13 | 5 | 14 | 34 | 37 | −3 | 44 | |
| 10 | Cúcuta Deportivo | 32 | 11 | 9 | 12 | 35 | 31 | +4 | 42 | |
| 11 | Orsomarso | 32 | 11 | 7 | 14 | 35 | 48 | −13 | 40 | |
| 12 | Barranquilla | 32 | 9 | 8 | 15 | 31 | 37 | −6 | 35 | |
| 13 | Unión Magdalena | 32 | 9 | 8 | 15 | 30 | 39 | −9 | 35 | |
| 14 | Real Santander | 32 | 9 | 6 | 17 | 33 | 51 | −18 | 33 | |
| 15 | Llaneros | 32 | 7 | 10 | 15 | 31 | 42 | −11 | 31 | |
| 16 | Atlético | 32 | 6 | 7 | 19 | 19 | 45 | −26 | 25 | |

Source: DIMAYOR
Rules for classification: 1) Points, 2) Goal difference, 3) Goals for, 4) Away goals for, 5) Away goals against, 6) Drawing of lots
(C) Champions
