= 2019 Copa Colombia =

Copa Águila 2019

Tournament details
- Country: Colombia
- Dates: 13 February – 6 November 2019
- Teams: 36

Final positions
- Champions: Independiente Medellín (2nd title)
- Runners-up: Deportivo Cali
- Copa Libertadores: Independiente Medellín

Tournament statistics
- Matches played: 114
- Goals scored: 284 (2.49 per match)
- Top goal scorer: Germán Cano (6 goals)

The 2019 Copa Colombia, officially the 2019 Copa Águila for sponsorship reasons, was the 17th edition of the Copa Colombia, the national cup competition for clubs of DIMAYOR. The tournament was contested by 36 teams, beginning on 13 February and ending on 6 November, with Independiente Medellín winning their second title by defeating Deportivo Cali in the finals by a 4–3 aggregate score and qualifying for the 2020 Copa Libertadores. Atlético Nacional were the defending champions, but were knocked out of the competition by Deportes Tolima in the quarterfinals.

== Format ==
This year the competition featured the return of the group stage, after being played under a single-elimination format in its entirety in the previous edition. The first stage was played by 28 teams, which were split into seven groups of four teams each based on a regional basis, where teams played each of the teams in their group twice. The seven group winners plus the best second-placed team qualified for the round of 16, where they were joined by the eight teams that qualified for CONMEBOL competitions for the 2019 season: Deportes Tolima, Junior, Independiente Medellín, Atlético Nacional, Once Caldas, La Equidad, Rionegro Águilas and Deportivo Cali. Starting from this point, the cup continued as a single-elimination tournament, with all subsequent rounds being played as double-legged series.

== Group stage ==
=== Group A ===
Pos	Team	Pld	W	D	L	GF	GA	GD	Pts	Qualification	PER	LEO	ENV	JAG
1	Deportivo Pereira	6	4	2	0	16	7	+9	14	Advance to knockout stage	—	2–1	3–1	5–1
2	Leones	6	2	2	2	8	8	0	8		2–4	—	0–0	1–0
3	Envigado	6	0	5	1	5	7	−2	5		0–0	1–1	—	1–1
4	Jaguares	6	0	3	3	7	14	−7	3		2–2	1–3	2–2	—

Source: Dimayor, Soccerway
Legend: Blue = home team win; Yellow = draw; Red = away team win.
Rules for classification: 1) Points, 2) Goal difference, 3) Goals for, 4) Away goals for, 5) Away goals against, 6) Drawing of lots.

=== Group B ===
Pos	Team	Pld	W	D	L	GF	GA	GD	Pts	Qualification	SFE	PAT	BOY	BOG
1	Santa Fe	6	2	4	0	10	7	+3	10	Advance to knockout stage	—	1–1	1–1	1–0
2	Patriotas	6	2	3	1	7	5	+2	9		1–3	—	0–0	1–0
3	Boyacá Chicó	6	1	4	1	6	6	0	7		2–2	1–1	—	2–1
4	Bogotá	6	1	1	4	4	9	−5	4		2–2	0–3	1–0	—

Source: Dimayor, Soccerway
Legend: Blue = home team win; Yellow = draw; Red = away team win.
Rules for classification: 1) Points, 2) Goal difference, 3) Goals for, 4) Away goals for, 5) Away goals against, 6) Drawing of lots.

=== Group C ===
Pos	Team	Pld	W	D	L	GF	GA	GD	Pts	Qualification	MIL	TIG	LLA	FOR
1	Millonarios	6	5	1	0	10	3	+7	16	Advance to knockout stage	—	2–0	1–1	1–0
2	Tigres	6	2	2	2	5	7	−2	8		1–3	—	0–0	2–1
3	Llaneros	6	1	3	2	4	5	−1	6		1–2	0–1	—	1–0
4	Fortaleza	6	0	2	4	3	7	−4	2		0–1	1–1	1–1	—

Source: Dimayor, Soccerway
Legend: Blue = home team win; Yellow = draw; Red = away team win.
Rules for classification: 1) Points, 2) Goal difference, 3) Goals for, 4) Away goals for, 5) Away goals against, 6) Drawing of lots.

=== Group D ===
Pos	Team	Pld	W	D	L	GF	GA	GD	Pts	Qualification	BUC	CUC	APE	VAL
1	Atlético Bucaramanga	6	2	3	1	9	5	+4	9	Advance to knockout stage	—	2–2	1–2	5–1
2	Cúcuta Deportivo	6	1	5	0	9	8	+1	8		0–0	—	2–1	1–1
3	Alianza Petrolera	6	2	2	2	7	6	+1	8		0–1	1–1	—	2–0
4	Valledupar	6	0	4	2	6	12	−6	4		0–0	3–3	1–1	—

Source: Dimayor, Soccerway
Legend: Blue = home team win; Yellow = draw; Red = away team win.
Rules for classification: 1) Points, 2) Goal difference, 3) Goals for, 4) Away goals for, 5) Away goals against, 6) Drawing of lots.

=== Group E ===
Pos	Team	Pld	W	D	L	GF	GA	GD	Pts	Qualification	RSA	RCA	MAG	BAR
1	Real San Andrés	6	3	1	2	11	9	+2	10	Advance to knockout stage	—	1–0	3–3	3–1
2	Real Cartagena	6	2	3	1	8	4	+4	9		1–0	—	0–0	4–0
3	Unión Magdalena	6	2	3	1	9	8	+1	9		3–4	1–1	—	1–0
4	Barranquilla	6	1	1	4	4	11	−7	4		1–0	2–2	0–1	—

Source: Dimayor, Soccerway
Legend: Blue = home team win; Yellow = draw; Red = away team win.
Rules for classification: 1) Points, 2) Goal difference, 3) Goals for, 4) Away goals for, 5) Away goals against, 6) Drawing of lots.

=== Group F ===
Pos	Team	Pld	W	D	L	GF	GA	GD	Pts	Qualification	AME	PAS	UPO	ATL
1	América de Cali	6	5	1	0	8	2	+6	16	Advance to knockout stage	—	1–1	1–0	1–0
2	Deportivo Pasto	6	4	1	1	9	6	+3	13	Advance to knockout stage	0–2	—	1–0	2–0
3	Universitario	6	0	2	4	6	10	−4	2		1–2	2–3	—	2–2
4	Atlético	6	0	2	4	4	9	−5	2		0–1	1–2	1–1	—

Source: Dimayor, Soccerway
Legend: Blue = home team win; Yellow = draw; Red = away team win.
Rules for classification: 1) Points, 2) Goal difference, 3) Goals for, 4) Away goals for, 5) Away goals against, 6) Drawing of lots.

=== Group G ===
Pos	Team	Pld	W	D	L	GF	GA	GD	Pts	Qualification	ORS	HUI	COR	QUI
1	Orsomarso	6	4	1	1	11	5	+6	13	Advance to knockout stage	—	3–0	3–1	3–1
2	Atlético Huila	6	3	2	1	7	6	+1	11		1–1	—	1–0	1–0
3	Cortuluá	6	1	2	3	5	7	−2	5		2–0	1–1	—	0–1
4	Deportes Quindío	6	1	1	4	4	7	−3	4		0–1	1–3	1–1	—

Source: Dimayor, Soccerway
Legend: Blue = home team win; Yellow = draw; Red = away team win.
Rules for classification: 1) Points, 2) Goal difference, 3) Goals for, 4) Away goals for, 5) Away goals against, 6) Drawing of lots.

=== Ranking of second-placed teams ===
The best team among those ranked second qualified for the knockout stage.

Pos	Grp	Team	Pld	W	D	L	GF	GA	GD	Pts	Result
1	F	Deportivo Pasto	6	4	1	1	9	6	+3	13	Knockout stage
2	G	Atlético Huila	6	3	2	1	7	6	+1	11	
3	E	Real Cartagena	6	2	3	1	8	4	+4	9	
4	B	Patriotas	6	2	3	1	7	5	+2	9	
5	D	Cúcuta Deportivo	6	1	5	0	9	8	+1	8	
6	A	Leones	6	2	2	2	8	8	0	8	
7	C	Tigres	6	2	2	2	5	7	−2	8	

Source: Dimayor
Rules for classification: 1) Points, 2) Goal difference, 3) Goals for, 4) Away goals for, 5) Away goals against, 6) Drawing of lots

== Knockout stage ==
Each tie in the knockout stage will be played in a home-and-away two-legged format. In each tie, the team which has the better overall record up to that stage will host the second leg, except in the round of 16 where the group winners automatically host the second leg. In case of a tie in aggregate score, neither the away goals rule nor extra time are applied, and the tie is decided by a penalty shoot-out. The teams that qualified for the 2019 Copa Libertadores and 2019 Copa Sudamericana entered the competition in the round of 16, being joined there by the seven group winners and the best second-placed team.

=== Bracket ===
Round of 16
Deportivo Cali	1	1	2
Real San Andrés	0	0	0
Junior	2	2	4
Atlético Bucaramanga	0	1	1
Atlético Nacional	3	0	3
Santa Fe	0	2	2
Deportes Tolima	3	5	8
Orsomarso	0	0	0
La Equidad	3	1	4 (3)
Deportivo Pasto (p)	2	2	4 (4)
Rionegro Águilas	1	0	1
Deportivo Pereira	1	1	2
Once Caldas	2	0	2
América de Cali	1	0	1
Independiente Medellín	2	2	4
Millonarios	1	2	3

Quarterfinals
Deportivo Cali (p)	2	1	3 (4)
Junior	1	2	3 (3)
Atlético Nacional	0	1	1
Deportes Tolima	1	1	2
Deportivo Pasto	4	0	4
Deportivo Pereira	0	2	2
Once Caldas	2	0	2
Independiente Medellín	3	1	4

Semifinals
Deportivo Cali	2	1	3
Deportes Tolima	1	1	2
Deportivo Pasto	1	2	3
Independiente Medellín	2	3	5

Final
Deportivo Cali	2	1	3
Independiente Medellín	2	2	4

=== Round of 16 ===
The teams qualifying from the group stage played the second leg at home. The first legs were played from 24 July to 8 August 2019, and the second legs were played on 14 and 15 August 2019.

Team 1	Agg.	Team 2	1st leg	2nd leg
Rionegro Águilas	1–2	Deportivo Pereira	1–1	0–1
Atlético Nacional	3–2	Santa Fe	3–0	0–2
Independiente Medellín	4–3	Millonarios	2–1	2–2
Junior	4–1	Atlético Bucaramanga	2–0	2–1
Deportivo Cali	2–0	Real San Andrés	1–0	1–0
Once Caldas	2–1	América de Cali	2–1	0–0
Deportes Tolima	8–0	Orsomarso	3–0	5–0
La Equidad	4–4 (3–4 p)	Deportivo Pasto	3–2	1–2

==== First leg ====
24 July 2019	Atlético Nacional	3–0	Santa Fe	Medellín
19:30	Barcos 11' (pen.), 28'; Barrera 73' (pen.)	Report		Stadium: Atanasio Girardot; Referee: John Hinestroza

31 July 2019	Rionegro Águilas	1–1	Deportivo Pereira	Rionegro
16:00	Rentería 75'	Report	Acevedo 32'	Stadium: Alberto Grisales; Referee: Ferney Trujillo

31 July 2019	Deportivo Cali	1–0	Real San Andrés	Palmira
19:30	Mercado 2'	Report		Stadium: Deportivo Cali; Referee: Ramiro Pabón

31 July 2019	Once Caldas	2–1	América de Cali	Manizales
19:30	Londoño 18'; García 88'	Report	Vergara 19'	Stadium: Palogrande; Referee: Never Manjarrés

31 July 2019	La Equidad	3–2	Deportivo Pasto	Bogotá
19:30	Mahecha 30'; Camacho 45'; Murillo 74'	Report	Vanegas 16'; Amaya 35'	Stadium: Metropolitano de Techo; Referee: Jorge Tabares

7 August 2019	Deportes Tolima	3–0	Orsomarso	Ibagué
15:45	Moya 27'; Centeno 63'; Hernández 90'	Report		Stadium: Manuel Murillo Toro; Referee: Óscar Gómez

7 August 2019	Independiente Medellín	2–1	Millonarios	Medellín
19:30	Cadavid 28'; Cano 86'	Report	Arango 82'	Stadium: Atanasio Girardot; Referee: Carlos Ortega

8 August 2019	Junior	2–0	Atlético Bucaramanga	Barranquilla
19:30	Cetré 16'; Murillo 23'	Report		Stadium: Metropolitano Roberto Meléndez; Referee: Luis Fernando Trujillo

==== Second leg ====
14 August 2019	Deportivo Pasto	2–1 (4–4 agg.) (4–3 p)	La Equidad	Ipiales
15:00	Hidalgo 19' (pen.); Ivey 40'	Report	Vargas 47'	Stadium: Municipal; Referee: Ricardo García

14 August 2019	Real San Andrés	0–1 (0–2 agg.)	Deportivo Cali	San Andrés Island
15:30		Report	Rivera 77'	Stadium: Erwin O'Neil; Referee: Fernando Acuña

14 August 2019	Orsomarso	0–5 (0–8 agg.)	Deportes Tolima	Palmira
15:30		Report	Plata 20', 63'; Castro 61'; Hernández 66'; Centeno 89'	Stadium: Francisco Rivera Escobar; Referee: Luis Matorel

14 August 2019	Deportivo Pereira	1–0 (2–1 agg.)	Rionegro Águilas	Pereira
16:00	Manzano 3'	Report		Stadium: Hernán Ramírez Villegas; Referee: Luis Fernando Trujillo

14 August 2019	América de Cali	0–0 (1–2 agg.)	Once Caldas	Cali
18:00		Report		Stadium: Pascual Guerrero; Referee: Leonard Mosquera

14 August 2019	Millonarios	2–2 (3–4 agg.)	Independiente Medellín	Bogotá
20:00	Ortiz 29', 32'	Report	Cano 16', 75'	Stadium: El Campín; Referee: Edilson Ariza

15 August 2019	Atlético Bucaramanga	1–2 (1–4 agg.)	Junior	Bucaramanga
18:00	Pineda 42'	Report	T. Gutiérrez 44'; Cetré 55'	Stadium: Alfonso López; Referee: Jorge Tabares

15 August 2019	Santa Fe	2–0 (2–3 agg.)	Atlético Nacional	Bogotá
20:00	Velásquez 69'; Murillo 90'	Report		Stadium: El Campín; Referee: Bismarks Santiago

=== Quarterfinals ===
The first legs were played on 28 and 29 August 2019, and the second legs were played on 11 and 12 September 2019. Team 2 hosted the second leg.

Team 1	Agg.	Team 2	1st leg	2nd leg
Deportivo Pasto	4–2	Deportivo Pereira	4–0	0–2
Atlético Nacional	1–2	Deportes Tolima	0–1	1–1
Once Caldas	2–4	Independiente Medellín	2–3	0–1
Deportivo Cali	3–3 (4–3 p)	Junior	2–1	1–2

==== First leg ====
28 August 2019	Once Caldas	2–3	Independiente Medellín	Manizales
19:30	Lemos 44' (pen.), 49'	Report	Díaz 28'; Arregui 73'; Cano 90+1'	Stadium: Palogrande; Referee: Jorge Guzmán

29 August 2019	Deportivo Pasto	4–0	Deportivo Pereira	Ipiales
14:00	Estupiñán 2', 26'; Rendón 50'; De La Rosa 65'	Report		Stadium: Municipal; Referee: Keiner Jiménez

29 August 2019	Atlético Nacional	0–1	Deportes Tolima	Medellín
18:00		Report	Ramos 59'	Stadium: Atanasio Girardot; Referee: Bismarks Santiago

29 August 2019	Deportivo Cali	2–1	Junior	Palmira
20:00	Rosero 84'; Arroyo 90+4'	Report	Pico 4'	Stadium: Deportivo Cali; Referee: Jorge Tabares

==== Second leg ====
11 September 2019	Deportes Tolima	1–1 (2–1 agg.)	Atlético Nacional	Ibagué
18:00	Banguero 74' (pen.)	Report	Barrera 40'	Stadium: Manuel Murillo Toro; Referee: Andrés Rojas

11 September 2019	Independiente Medellín	1–0 (4–2 agg.)	Once Caldas	Medellín
20:15	Marulanda 90+5'	Report		Stadium: Atanasio Girardot; Referee: Luis Matorel

12 September 2019	Deportivo Pereira	2–0 (2–4 agg.)	Deportivo Pasto	Pereira
18:00	Cano 12'; Navarro 75' (pen.)	Report		Stadium: Hernán Ramírez Villegas; Referee: Never Manjarrés

12 September 2019	Junior	2–1 (3–3 agg.) (3–4 p)	Deportivo Cali	Barranquilla
20:15	Acuña 15'; Fernández 90+2'	Report	Rivera 36'	Stadium: Metropolitano Roberto Meléndez; Referee: Edilson Ariza
	Penalties
	Narváez (penalty missed); Piedrahita (penalty scored); Haydar (penalty scored); Sandoval (penalty scored); Hinestroza (penalty missed)		(penalty scored) Rivera; (penalty scored) Dinenno; (penalty scored) Arroyo; (penalty missed) Angulo; (penalty scored) Mercado

=== Semifinals ===
The first legs were played on 25 September, and the second legs were played on 16 October.

Team 1	Agg.	Team 2	1st leg	2nd leg
Deportivo Cali	3–2	Deportes Tolima	2–1	1–1
Deportivo Pasto	3–5	Independiente Medellín	1–2	2–3

==== First leg ====
25 September 2019	Deportivo Pasto	1–2	Independiente Medellín	Ipiales
15:00	Estupiñán 85' (pen.)	Report	Arregui 40'; Ricaurte 56'	Stadium: Municipal; Referee: Luis Fernando Trujillo

25 September 2019	Deportivo Cali	2–1	Deportes Tolima	Palmira
19:45	Rentería 76'; Tapia 90'	Report	Vásquez 13'	Stadium: Deportivo Cali; Referee: Alexander Ospina

==== Second leg ====
16 October 2019	Deportes Tolima	1–1 (2–3 agg.)	Deportivo Cali	Ibagué
18:30	Moya 85'	Report	Rivera 34'	Stadium: Manuel Murillo Toro; Referee: Andrés Rojas

16 October 2019	Independiente Medellín	3–2 (5–3 agg.)	Deportivo Pasto	Medellín
20:30	Quiñónes 19'; Murillo 37'; Henao 44' (o.g.)	Report	Estupiñán 45+1' (pen.), 80' (pen.)	Stadium: Atanasio Girardot; Referee: Wander Mosquera

=== Finals ===
2 November 2019
18:00

Deportivo Cali	2–2	Independiente Medellín
Dinenno 34'; Mercado 52'	Report	Moreno 10'; Cano 45+3' (pen.)

Estadio Deportivo Cali, Palmira
Referee: Nicolás Rodríguez

6 November 2019
19:30

Independiente Medellín	2–1	Deportivo Cali
Arregui 20'; Cano 35'	Report	Rosero 90+3'

Estadio Atanasio Girardot, Medellín
Referee: Mario Herrera

Independiente Medellín won 4–3 on aggregate.

== See also ==
- 2019 Categoría Primera A season
- 2019 Categoría Primera B season
