= Yohn =

Yohn is a surname. Notable people with the surname include:

- Yohn Geiller Mosquera (born 1989), Colombian footballer
- Erica Yohn (1930–2019), American actress
- Frederick Coffay Yohn (1875–1933), artist and magazine illustrator
- Rake Yohn (born 1975), member of the CKY Crew

== See also ==
- Yohan (disambiguation)
