= Yohan =

Yohan may refer to:

- Yohan (name), a masculine given name
- Yohan: The Child Wanderer, Norwegian/English family film from 2010
- Yohan, a Greek cargo ship involved in the Sinking of F174, a fishing boat during a human smuggling operation off Sicily on Christmas night, 1996.
- Yohan, a singer in Korean pop group TST
