= Lucas Sotero =

Brazilian footballer

Personal information
- Full name: Lucas Alves Sotero da Cunha
- Date of birth: 21 May 1991 (age 35)
- Place of birth: Natal, Brazil
- Height: 1.76 m (5 ft 9 1/2 in)
- Position: Midfielder

Youth career
- –2011: Atlético Paranaense

Senior career*
Years	Team	Apps	(Gls)
2010–2012	Atlético Paranaense	1	(0)
2010	→ Dinamo Minsk (loan)	12	(3)
2013	Santa Cruz-RS	7	(2)
2013	Figueirense	2	(0)
2014	Villa Nova	24	(2)
2015	Paraná	2	(0)
2015	Concórdia	2	(0)
2016–2017	Anápolis	30	(4)
2016	→ Sampaio Corrêa (loan)	14	(2)
2017–2018	Cortuluá	41	(0)
2019–2020	Unión Magdalena	18	(1)
- * Club domestic league appearances and goals as of 10:36, 9 June 2020 (UTC)

Lucas Alves Sotero da Cunha, or simply Lucas Sotero, is a Brazilian former footballer.

== Career ==
He played in FC Dinamo Minsk on loan from Atlético Paranaense until he returned in early 2011.

=== Career statistics ===
(Correct as of October 16, 2010)

Club	Season	State League		Brazilian Série A		Copa do Brasil		Copa Libertadores		Copa Sudamericana		Total	
Club	Season	Apps	Goals	Apps	Goals	Apps	Goals	Apps	Goals	Apps	Goals	Apps	Goals
Atlético Paranaense	2010	-	-	0	0	-	-	-	-	-	-	0	0
Total		-	-	0	0	-	-	-	-	-	-	0	0
