= Diego Herazo =

Colombian footballer (born 1996)

Personal information
- Full name: Diego Fernando Herazo Moreno
- Date of birth: 14 April 1996 (age 30)
- Place of birth: Condoto, Colombia
- Height: 1.80 m (5 ft 11 in)
- Position: Forward

Team information
- Current team: San Lorenzo
- Number: 18

Youth career
- Independiente Medellín

Senior career*
Years	Team	Apps	(Gls)
2015–2016	Independiente Medellín	4	(0)
2016–2017	Cúcuta Deportivo	9	(1)
2018	Valledupar	30	(16)
2019–2022	Independiente Medellín	24	(3)
2020	→ Atlético Bucaramanga (loan)	23	(9)
2021	→ La Equidad (loan)	21	(11)
2022	→ Millonarios (loan)	42	(9)
2023–2024	Deportes Tolima	40	(15)
2024–	San Lorenzo	32	(3)
2024–2025	→ Nacional (loan)	18	(5)
- * Club domestic league appearances and goals as of 17:59, 21 November 2026 (UTC)

Diego Fernando Herazo Moreno (born 14 April 1996) is a Colombian footballer who plays as a forward for Argentine side San Lorenzo.

== Career ==
Herazo started his career with Colombian top flight side Independiente Medellín, where he made 9 appearances and scored 0 goals. On 27 July 2015, he debuted for Independiente Medellín during a 1–0 win over Deportes Tolima.

== Career statistics ==
As of 9 May 2024.

Appearances and goals by club, season and competition
Club	Division	League			Cup		Continental		Total	
Club	Division	Season	Apps	Goals	Apps	Goals	Apps	Goals	Apps	Goals
Independiente Medellín	Categoría Primera A	2015	3	0	1	0	-		4	0
Independiente Medellín	Categoría Primera A	2016	1	0	4	0	-		5	0
Independiente Medellín	Categoría Primera A	2019	22	2	-		2	0	24	2
Independiente Medellín	Categoría Primera A	2021	2	1	2	0	-		4	1
Independiente Medellín	Total		28	3	7	0	2	0	37	3
Cúcuta Deportivo	Categoría Primera B	2016	8	1	2	0	-		10	1
Cúcuta Deportivo	Categoría Primera B	2017	1	0	1	0	-		2	0
Cúcuta Deportivo	Total		9	1	3	0	0	0	12	1
Valledupar	Categoría Primera B	2018	30	16	2	1	-		32	17
Atlético Bucaramanga	Categoría Primera A	2020	23	9	1	0	-		24	9
La Equidad	Categoría Primera A	2021	21	11	-		7	2	28	13
Millonarios	Categoría Primera A	2022	42	9	6	3	2	0	50	12
Deportes Tolima	Categoría Primera A	2023	39	14	1	0	7	2	47	16
Deportes Tolima	Categoría Primera A	2024	1	0	0	0	0	0	1	0
Deportes Tolima	Total		40	14	1	0	7	2	48	16
San Lorenzo	Primera División	2024	9	1	1	0	4	0	14	1
Career total			213	62	21	4	22	4	256	70

== Honours ==
Independiente Medellín

- Categoría Primera A: 2016-I
- Copa Colombia: 2019

Millonarios

- Copa Colombia: 2022

Nacional

- Torneo Intermedio: 2024
- Supercopa Uruguaya: 2025
- Primera División: 2025
