= Diego Sevillano =

Argentine footballer

Personal information
- Full name: Diego Nahuel Sevillano
- Date of birth: 24 February 1991 (age 35)
- Place of birth: Tunuyán, Argentina
- Height: 1.75 m (5 ft 9 in)
- Position: Forward

Team information
- Current team: F.A.D.E.P

Youth career
- Godoy Cruz

Senior career*
Years	Team	Apps	(Gls)
2012–2013	Godoy Cruz	6	(1)
2013–2014	Oțelul Galați	6	(0)
2014–2015	Unión San Felipe	26	(8)
2015–2018	Deportes Quindío	81	(20)
2019–2021	F.A.D.E.P		
2022	Bolívar		
2022–2023	F.A.D.E.P		
2024	Ferro (GP)	19	(0)
2024–	F.A.D.E.P		
- * Club domestic league appearances and goals as of 20:40, 7 January 2026 (UTC)

Diego Nahuel Sevillano (born February 24, 1991, in Mendoza, Argentina) is an Argentine footballer currently playing for F.A.D.E.P in the Liga Mendocina de Fútbol of Argentina.

== Career ==
=== Club career ===
In August 2019 it was confirmed, that Sevillano had moved to FADEP (Fundación Amigos por el Deporte). In February 2022, he moved to Club Ciudad de Bolívar. By the end of 2024, he returned to F.A.D.E.P where he is still playing.
