= Wilson Carpintero =

Colombian football striker (born 1977)

Personal information
- Full name: Wilson Alberto Carpintero Mendoza
- Date of birth: 15 September 1977 (age 49)
- Place of birth: Tubará, Colombia
- Height: 1.78 m (5 ft 10 in)
- Position: Winger

Senior career*
Years	Team	Apps	(Gls)
1998–1999	Independiente Medellín	23	(3)
2000	Independiente Santa Fe	0	(0)
2001	Deportivo Pasto	7	(0)
2002–2004	Atlético Bucaramanga	103	(36)
2004	Atlético Junior	13	(4)
2005	Caracas		
2005	Millonarios	16	(4)
2006–2007	Caracas		
2007–2009	La Equidad	107	(27)
2010	Cúcuta	23	(14)
2011	Millonarios	31	(5)
2012	Envigado	17	(1)
2012–2013	Patriotas	26	(0)
2013–2016	Deportes Quindío	110	(31)
2017	Tigres	17	(1)
2017–2018	Deportes Quindío	43	(5)

International career
2003	Colombia	1	(0)
- * Club domestic league appearances and goals

Wilson Alberto Carpintero Mendoza (born 15 September 1977) is a retired Colombian footballer. He played as a striker.
