= Miguel Murillo (footballer, born 1988) =

Colombian footballer (born 1988)

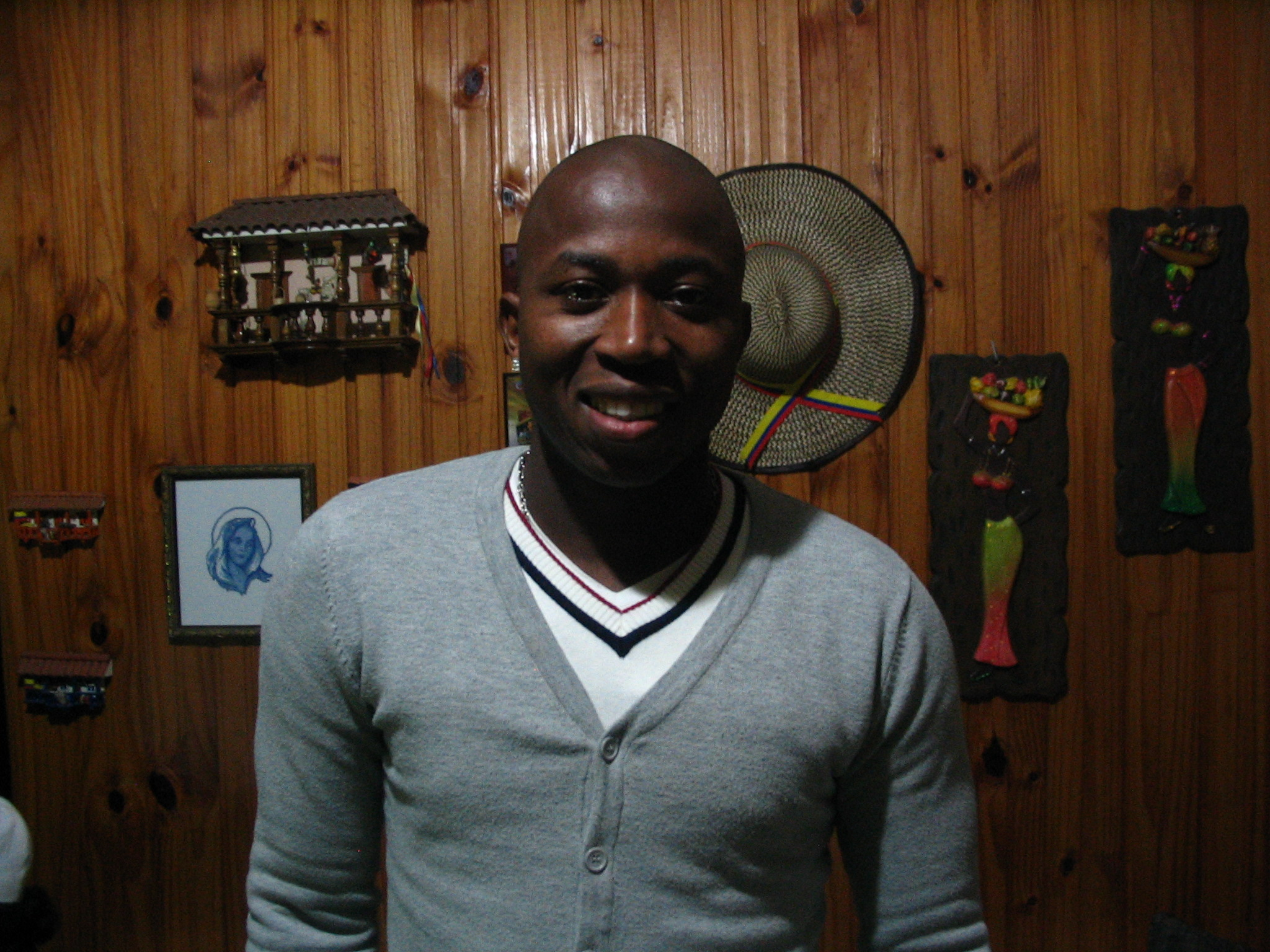
- Murillo in 2012

Personal information
- Full name: Miguel Antonio Murillo Rivas
- Date of birth: 3 July 1988 (age 38)
- Place of birth: Bogotá, Colombia
- Height: 1.72 m (5 ft 7 1/2 in)
- Position: Striker

Senior career*
Years	Team	Apps	(Gls)
2006–2010	Juventud Las Piedras	43	(14)
2010–2012	El Tanque Sisley	50	(11)
2013–2015	Audax Italiano	7	(0)
2013–2014	Audax Italiano B	19	(0)
2014–2015	→ El Tanque Sisley (loan)	24	(4)
2015	→ Olmedo (loan)	0	(0)
2016	Al-Faisaly		
2016–2017	Atlético Huila	10	(0)
2018–2019	Real Cartagena	36	(6)
2019	CD Municipal Limeño	12	(3)
- * Club domestic league appearances and goals

Miguel Antonio Murillo Rivas (born 3 July 1988 in Bogotá) is a Colombian former footballer who played as a striker.

== Career ==
Murillo began his professional career playing with Uruguayan side Juventud Las Piedras in 2006. He spent the next two years playing in the Second Division until mid-2007, when his team returned to the First División. He scored his first goal in Uruguay's top-flight football league on 4 May 2008 in a 1–1 away draw against Montevideo Wanderers.

In August 2010, he signed a new deal with El Tanque Sisley.

In 2013, Murillo moved to Chile and signed with Audax Italiano in the top level, also taking part in the Segunda División Profesional with the B-team. He ended his contract at the end of 2015.
