= César Amaya =

Colombian footballer (born 1990)

Personal information
- Full name: César Andrés Amaya Solano
- Date of birth: 12 December 1990 (age 35)
- Place of birth: Valledupar, Colombia
- Height: 1.77 m (5 ft 10 in)
- Position: Forward

Youth career
- Once Caldas

Senior career*
Years	Team	Apps	(Gls)
2006–2007	Once Caldas		
2007–2017	Deportivo Cali	53	(12)
2007	→ Guaros de Lara (loan)		
2012	→ Real Cartagena (loan)	8	(0)
2014	→ Deportes Tolima (loan)	9	(2)
2015	→ Atlético Bucaramanga (loan)	28	(10)
2016	→ Rionegro Águilas (loan)	15	(3)
2018	Once Caldas	31	(3)
2019	Deportivo Cali	6	(0)
2019	Deportivo Pasto	6	(2)
2020	Cortuluá	20	(4)
2021	Deportivo Pasto	2	(0)
2021	Llaneros	14	(2)
- * Club domestic league appearances and goals as of 16:48, 9 April 2023 (UTC)

César Amaya (born 12 October 1990) is a Colombian professional footballer who plays as forward.

== Honours ==
Atlético Bucaramanga

- Categoría Primera B (1): 2015

Deportes Tolima

- Copa Colombia (1): 2014

Deportivo Cali

- Copa Colombia (1): 2010
