= Diego Echeverri =

Colombian footballer (born 1989)

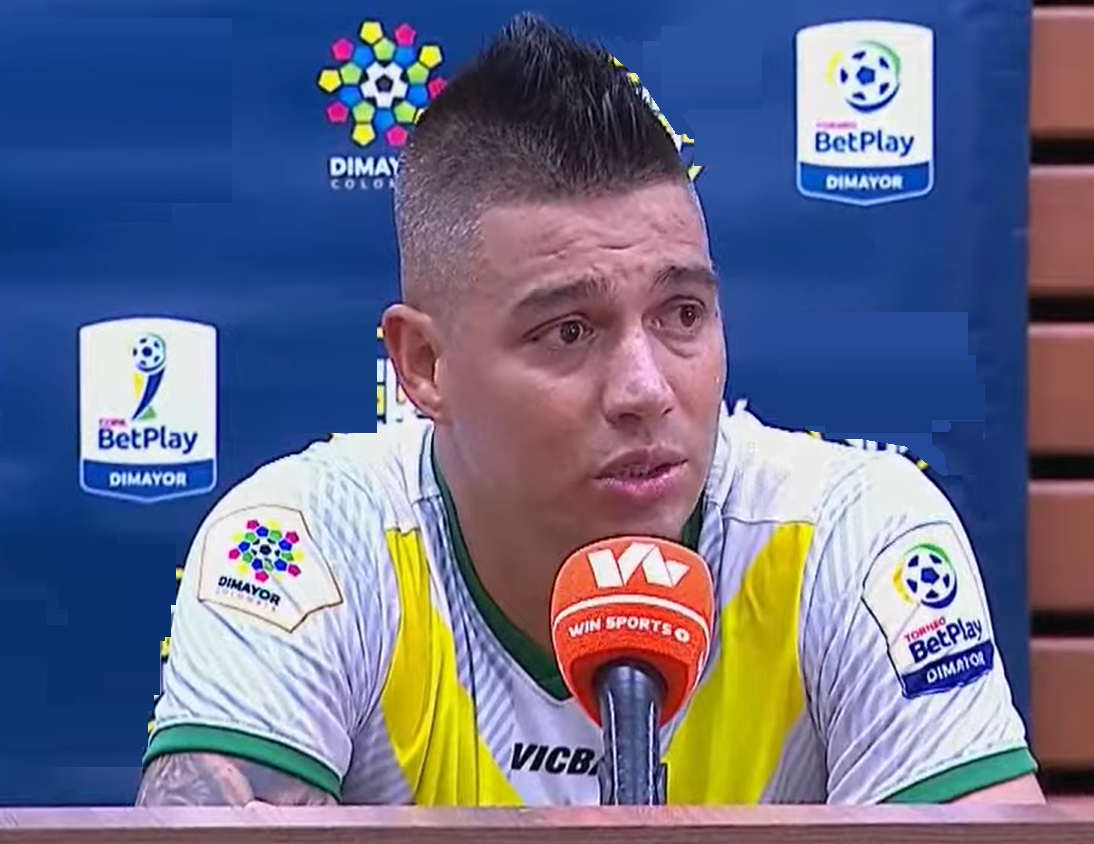
- Echeverri with Deportes Quindío in 2023

Personal information
- Full name: Diego Armando Echeverri Gil
- Date of birth: 21 July 1989 (age 37)
- Place of birth: Medellín, Colombia
- Height: 1.82 m (6 ft 0 in)
- Position: Forward

Team information
- Current team: Deportes Quindío
- Number: 29

Senior career*
| Years | Team | Apps | (Gls) |
| 2012 | Cortuluá | 1 | (0) |
| 2013–2015 | Real Cartagena | 67 | (24) |
| 2016 | Atlético Bucaramanga | 5 | (1) |
| 2016–2017 | Cúcuta Deportivo | 48 | (14) |
| 2018 | Deportivo Pereira | 26 | (11) |
| 2019 | Always Ready | 1 | (0) |
| 2019 | Atlético Huila | 14 | (1) |
| 2020 | Boyacá Chicó | 25 | (1) |
| 2021-2022 | Llaneros | 50 | (23) |
| 2023– | Deportes Quindío | 19 | (4) |
- * Club domestic league appearances and goals as of 15 September 2023 (UTC)

Diego Armando Echeverri Gil (born 21 July 1989) is a Colombian professional footballer who plays for Deportes Quindío as a forward.

== Career ==
Born in Medellín, Echeverri has played for Cortuluá, Real Cartagena, Atlético Bucaramanga, Cúcuta Deportivo and Deportivo Pereira. In April 2016 he claimed that he and his family were attacked by people dressed as Atlético Bucaramanga fans.
