= Jonathan Agudelo =

Colombian footballer (born 1992)

Jhonatan Agudelo
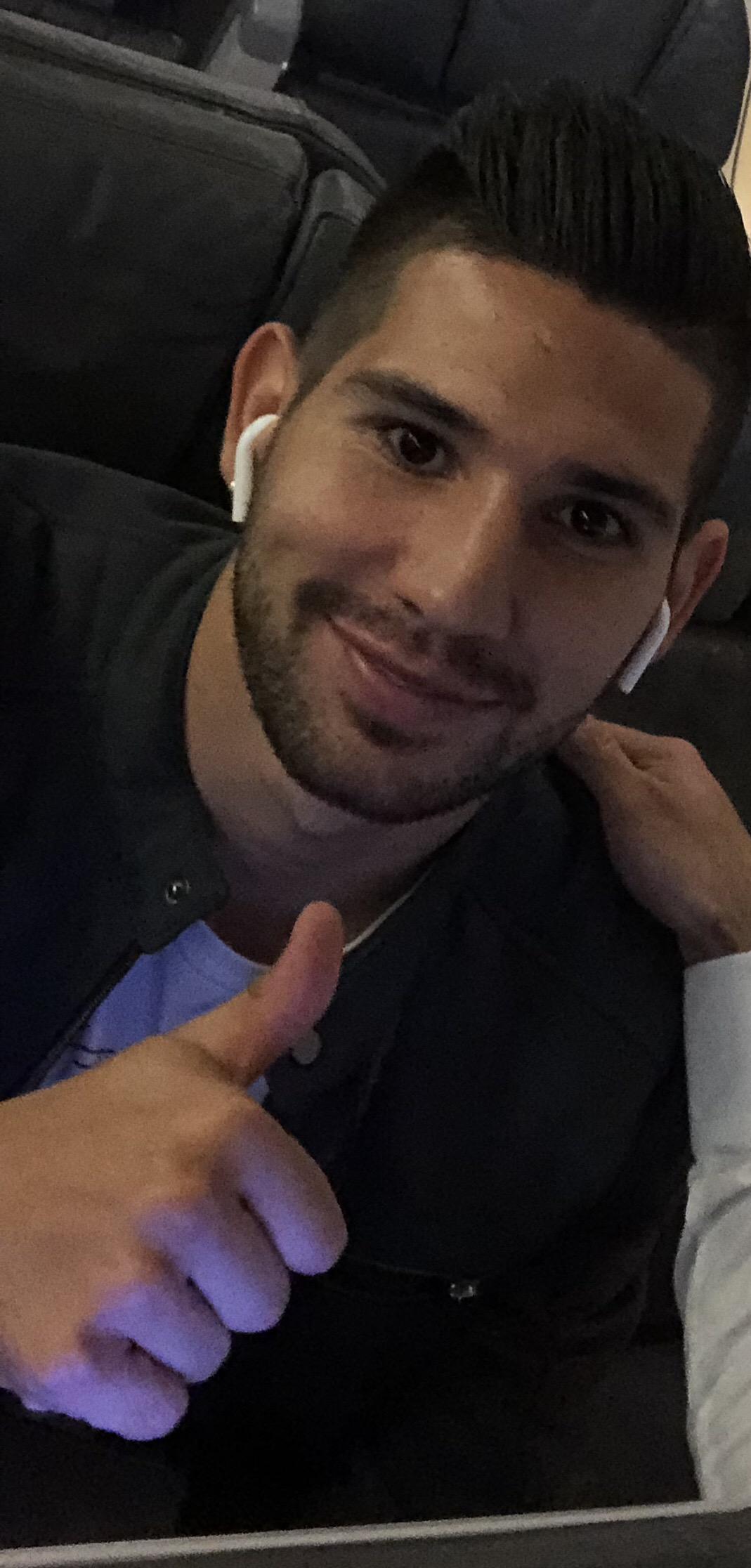

Personal information
- Full name: Jhonatan Alexander Agudelo Velásquez
- Date of birth: 17 December 1992 (age 33)
- Place of birth: Cúcuta, Colombia
- Height: 1.76 m (5 ft 9 1/2 in)
- Position: Forward

Team information
- Current team: Cúcuta Deportivo
- Number: 32

Youth career
- Millonarios

Senior career*
Years	Team	Apps	(Gls)
2013–2016	Millonarios	60	(12)
2016	Santa Fe	7	(0)
2017	Jaguares de Córdoba	7	(0)
2017–2019	Cúcuta Deportivo	55	(36)
2020	Gimnasia LP	4	(1)
2020–2021	Hapoel Be'er Sheva	23	(0)
2021–2022	Águilas Rionegro	11	(2)
2023–2024	Cúcuta Deportivo	69	(24)
2024–2025	Uthai Thani	12	(4)
2025–	Cúcuta Deportivo	19	(11)
- * Club domestic league appearances and goals as of 3 December 2025

Jhonatan Alexander Agudelo Velásquez (born 17 December 1992) is a Colombian professional footballer who plays as a forward for Categoría Primera B club Cúcuta Deportivo.
