= Yohn Mosquera =

Colombian footballer (born 1989)

Personal information
- Full name: Yohn Géiler Mosquera Martínez
- Date of birth: 15 April 1989 (age 37)
- Place of birth: Turbo, Colombia
- Height: 1.76 m (5 ft 9 1/2 in)
- Position: Defensive midfielder

Team information
- Current team: Real Estelí

Senior career*
Years	Team	Apps	(Gls)
2009–2012	Independiente Medellín	6	(0)
2011–2012	→ Bahia (loan)	0	(0)
2013–2016	Itagüí Ditaires	101	(0)
2016–2017	Real Cartagena	42	(2)
2018	Cortuluá	28	(3)
2019	Jaguares de Córdoba	26	(0)
2020	Real Estelí	3	(0)
2021–2022	Diriangén	4	(1)
2023	Managua	0	(0)
- * Club domestic league appearances and goals as of 16:07, 25 May 2020 (UTC)

Yohn Géiller Mosquera Martínez, better known as Yohn Mosquera (born 15 April 1989), is a Colombian footballer who plays as a defensive midfielder for Real Estelí FC of the Liga Primera de Nicaragua.

== Career ==
Born in Turbo city, Yohn Geiller Mosquera started his professional career in 2009, playing for Medellín. He played six Colombian First Division games for the club without scoring a goal. He was transferred to Série A club Bahia of Brazil on 20 February 2011.
