= Feiver Mercado =

Colombian footballer (born 1990)

Personal information
- Full name: Feiver Alfonso Mercado Galera
- Date of birth: 1 June 1990 (age 36)
- Place of birth: Galapa, Colombia
- Height: 1.74 m (5 ft 9 in)
- Position: Forward

Team information
- Current team: Jaguares de Córdoba

Senior career*
Years	Team	Apps	(Gls)
2009	Deportes Quindío	8	(1)
2011–2014	Universitario Popayán	119	(38)
2015–2016	América de Cali	40	(10)
2017–2019	Cortuluá	69	(43)
2019	→ Deportivo Cali (loan)	39	(9)
2020	Deportivo Pasto	18	(5)
2021–2022	Cortulua	47	(14)
2022–2023	Malacateco	16	(6)
2023–	Jaguares de Córdoba	3	(0)
- * Club domestic league appearances and goals as of 17 August 2023

Feiver Mercado (born 1 June 1990) is a Colombian professional footballer who plays as a forward for Jaguares de Córdoba.
