= Estadio Ciro López =

Football stadium located in Popayán, Colombia

Coordinates: 02°27′16″N 76°35′30″W

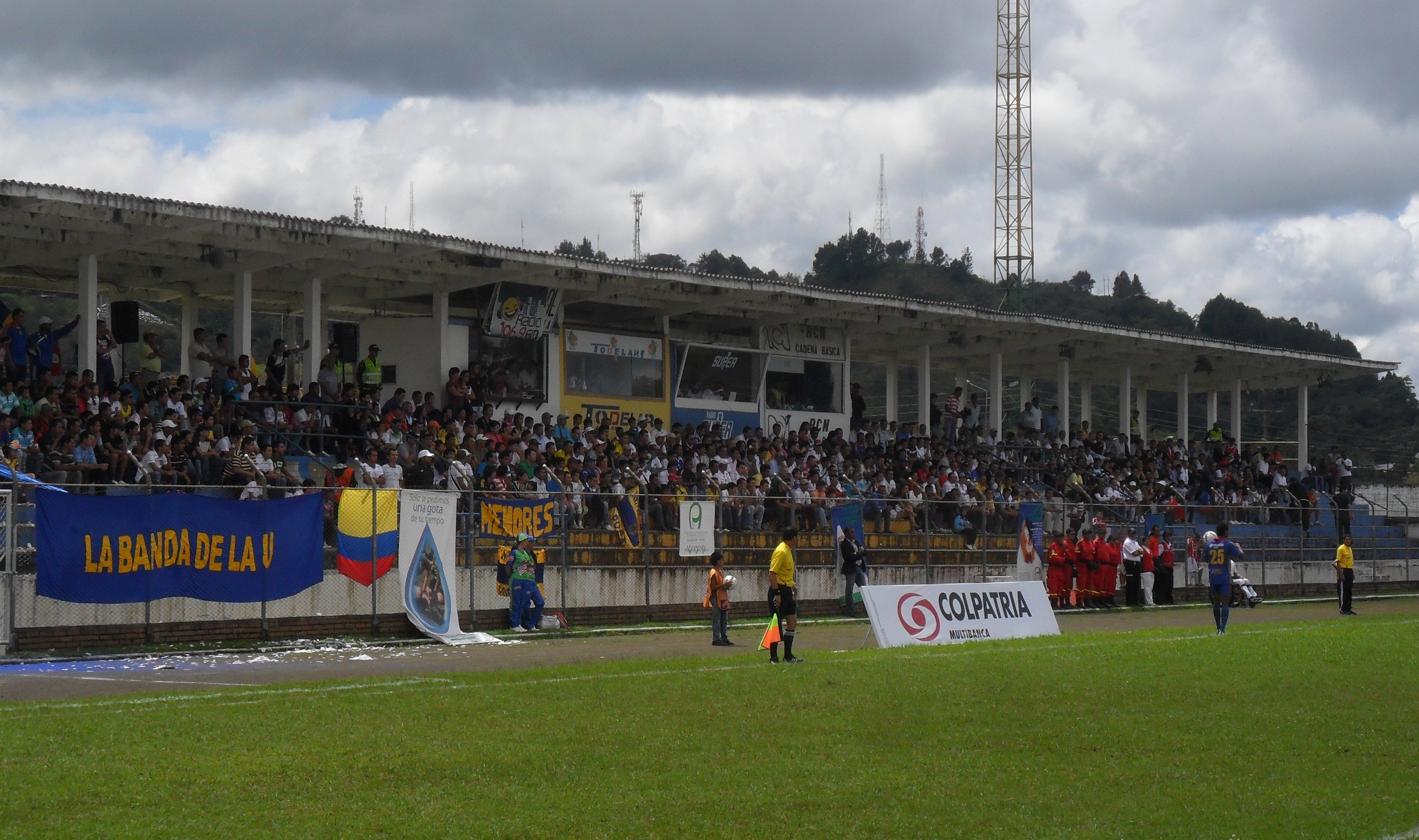
- Interactive map of Estadio Ciro López
- Location: Popayán, Colombia
- Owner: Cauca Football League
- Capacity: 5,000
- Surface: Natural grass

Construction
- Opened: 8 July 1951

Tenants
- Independiente Popayán (1995); Atlético Popayán (1999); Dimerco Real Popayán (2003); Universitario Popayán (2011–2019)

Estadio Ciro López is a football stadium located in Popayán, Colombia. The stadium was opened on 8 July 1951 with a match between the Cauca Department football team and Millonarios, who were at the time known as the Ballet Azul (Blue Ballet). It has a capacity of 5,000 spectators and served as home stadium for Independiente Popayán, Atlético Popayán, Dimerco Real Popayán, and Universitario Popayán, teams that competed in the Categoría Primera B.

Since the second half of 2011, it is the new home of the Centauros team of the Primera B, from Villavicencio, who was renamed Universitario de Popayán, after a series of agreements between the mayor of the city and the directives of the team, which represents the city in the promotion tournament in Colombia since the second half of 2011. To be remodeled, the Cauca football league must enter into negotiations with the mayor's office the session or sale of the sports venue, but due to the lack of commitment of its leaders, the city of Popayán does not have in the short future a worthy football venue for a departmental capital to show to all of Colombia.
