= Estadio Centenario (Armenia, Colombia) =

Football stadium in Armenia, Colombia

Estadio Centenario de Armenia
- El Jardín de América (The Garden of America)
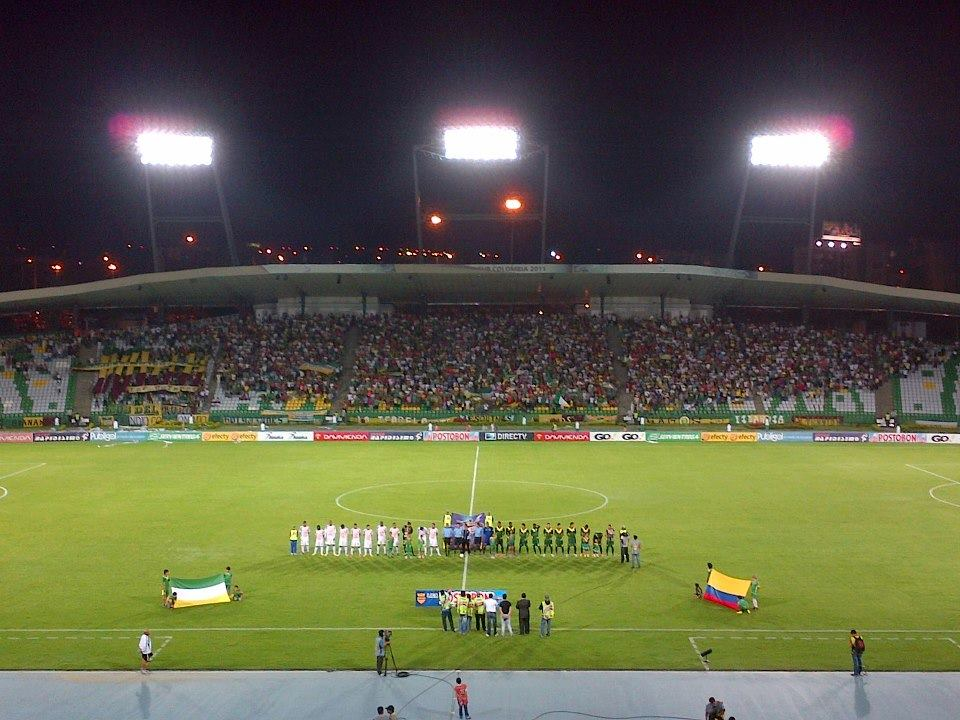
- Interactive map of Estadio Centenario de Armenia
- Location: Armenia, Colombia
- Coordinates: 4.515307°N 75.698447°W
- Capacity: 23,500
- Surface: grass
- Field size: 110 x 90 m

Construction
- Opened: 1988

Tenant
- Deportes Quindío

The Estadio Centenario is a multi-purpose stadium built in 1988 in Armenia, Colombia. It is currently used mainly for football matches and is the home stadium of Deportes Quindío. The capacity is 23,500.

== History ==
The stadium was capped at 20,716 for the 2011 FIFA U-20 World Cup.
