= Bogotá F.C. =

Colombian football club

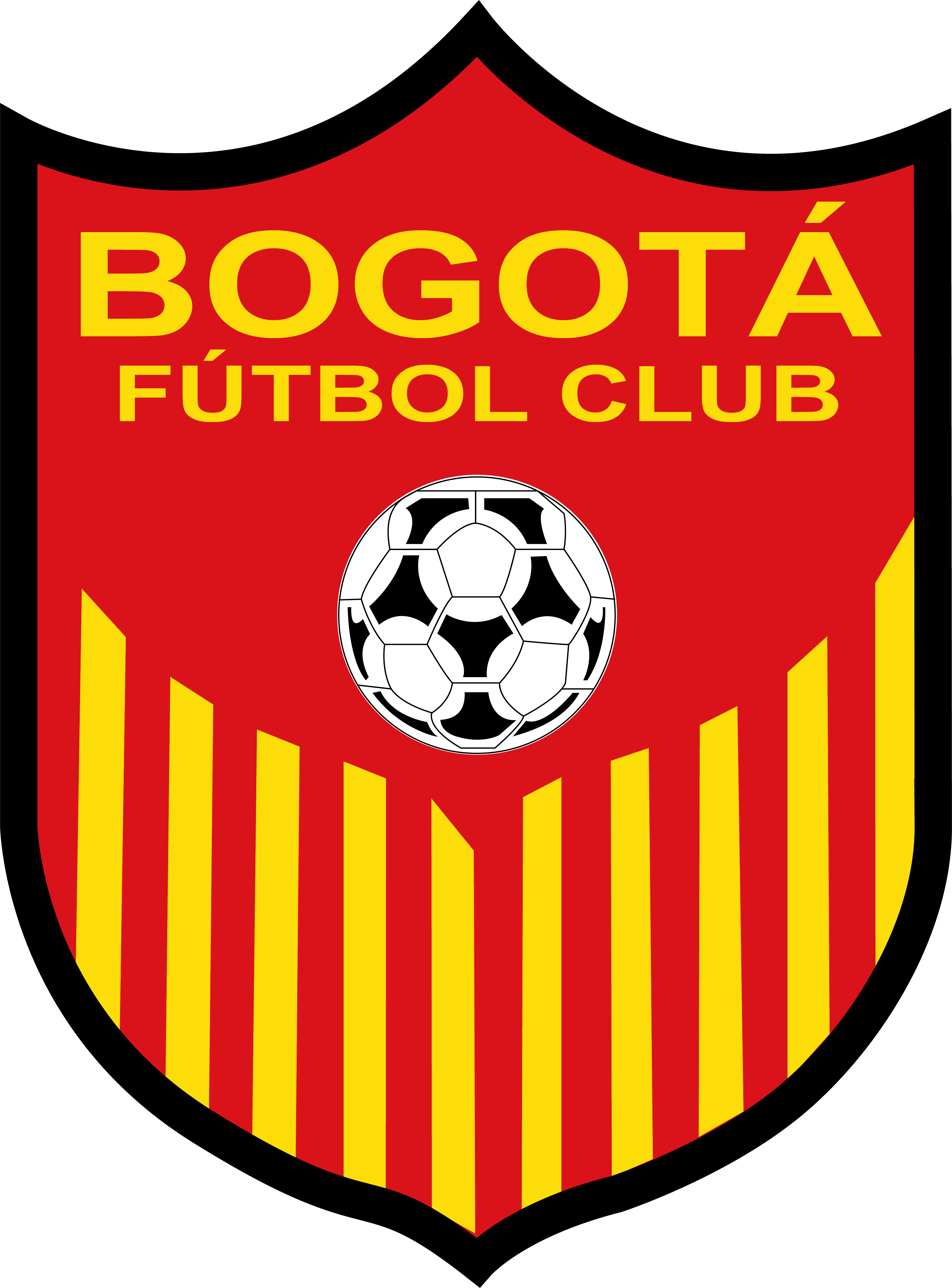
- Full name: Bogotá Fútbol Club S.A.
- Nickname: Los Bogotanos
- Founded: 13 January 2003; 23 years ago
- Ground: Metropolitano de Techo
- Capacity: 10,000
- President: Ferney Perdomo
- Head coach: Luis Herney Melo
- League: Categoría Primera B
- 2025: Primera B, 13th of 16
- Website: www.bogotafc.com.co
Home colours	Away colours

Bogotá F.C. is a Colombian professional football team based in Bogotá, that currently plays in the Categoría Primera B. They play their home games at the Estadio Metropolitano de Techo.

== History ==
Bogotá F.C. is a club with a duality in its history, having been born under its current name in 2004 when it debuted in the Colombian second division, but coming from another club named Club El Cóndor which was founded in 1991 and played under three different guises: in 2000 the club was called El Cóndor, in 2002 Cóndor Real Bogotá and a few years later Cóndor Deportivo Sur-Bogotá.

Bogotá's best performance was achieved in the first half of 2007 in the Copa Premier, after qualifying to a semifinal phase for the first time ever, with a near-perfect season and a roster mixing experienced players and young talents such as Javier Cuero.

In 2005, the team's management was taken over by the company "GoGo" which provided capital to the team. During the 2010 season, played in one tournament, Bogotá performed a great campaign, advancing to the semi-finals in sixth place. After leading their group in the first half of that stage with seven points out of nine, they were eliminated after losing 3–2 at home against Deportivo Pasto and drawing 1–1 with Patriotas, also at home.

In March 2012 it was announced that due to a lack of support in Bogotá, the club would be leaving for the city of Montería in the department of Córdoba for the 2013 season. DIMAYOR granted this request on March 27, but negotiations ultimately fell through and Bogotá decided to stay at the Colombian capital.

== Current squad ==
As of 27 September 2026

Note: Flags indicate national team as defined under FIFA eligibility rules; some limited exceptions apply. Players may hold more than one non-FIFA nationality.

No.	Pos.	Nation	Player
1	GK	COL	Jerónimo Osorno
2	DF	COL	Malcom Palacios (on loan from Independiente Medellín)
3	DF	COL	Sergio Díaz
5	MF	COL	Juan Sánchez
6	MF	COL	Kevin Castro
7	FW	COL	Kevin Aladesanmi
8	MF	COL	Jafe Pérez
9	FW	COL	Samuel Perea
11	FW	COL	Harold Sandoval
12	GK	COL	Brayan Benítez
13	DF	COL	Juan Camilo Moreno
14	MF	COL	Kevin Viveros
15	MF	COL	Jeyson Velasco
16	DF	PAN	Humberto Ramos

No.	Pos.	Nation	Player
18	FW	COL	Brayan Cuero
19	MF	COL	Davinson Estupiñán
20	FW	COL	Nezareth Segura
21	FW	COL	Juan Manuel Arango
22	MF	COL	Ray Vanegas
24	MF	COL	Jair Velasco
28	DF	COL	Mauricio Medina
29	GK	COL	Daniel Aguilar
30	DF	COL	Freilin Moreno
31	DF	COL	Juan Camilo Asprilla
32	DF	COL	Alejandro Restrepo (on loan from Jaguares de Córdoba)
36	DF	COL	José Palacios (on loan from Independiente Medellín)
81	FW	COL	Yeisson Mosquera

== Managers ==
- (Colombia) Alberto Gamero (2004)
- (Colombia) Juan Carlos Grueso (January 2005 – June 2007)
- (Colombia) Álvaro Zuluaga (January 2008 – August 2008)
- (Colombia) Oswaldo Durán (August 2008 – August 2010)
- (Colombia) Fernando Velasco (August 2010 – December 2010)
- (Colombia) Albeiro García (January 2011 – April 2011)
- (Colombia) Hernán Pacheco (April 2011 – October 2012)
- (Colombia) Néstor Rodríguez (January 2013 – June 2013)
- (Colombia) Oswaldo Durán (July 2013 – September 2014)
- (Colombia) Germán Morales (September 2013 – February 2014)
- (Colombia) Hernán Pacheco (February 2014 – December 2015)
- (Colombia) Néstor Rodríguez (January 2016 – May 2017)
- (Colombia) Ernesto Pacheco (May 2017 – July 2018)
- (Colombia) Mauricio Roa (August 2017 – November 2018)
- (Colombia) Jairo Patiño (January 2019 – December 2019)
- (Colombia) Ricardo Parra (January 2020 – December 2020)
- (Argentina) Martín Cardetti (January 2021 – November 2021)
- (Colombia) Hernán Pacheco (November 2021 – December 2021)
- (Spain) Jonathan Risueño (January 2022 – July 2022)
- (Colombia) David Suárez (July 2022 – December 2022)
- (Colombia) Francisco Nájera (January 2023 – February 2023)
- (Colombia) Leonardo Rincón (February 2023 – March 2023)
- (Colombia) César Torres (March 2023 – June 2023)
- (Portugal) Pedro Santos (June 2023 – July 2023)
- (Colombia) Armando Osma (July 2023 – October 2023)
- (Colombia) Hugo Mejía (October 2023 – December 2023)
- (Colombia) Néstor Rodríguez (January 2024 – May 2025)
- (Colombia) Luis Herney Melo (May 2025 – present)
