= Universitario Popayán =

Colombian football club

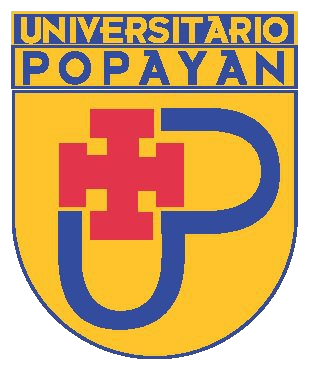
- Full name: Universitario Popayán Corporación Deportiva
- Nicknames: Los Patojos; Los Próceres; Los Universitarios
- Founded: 21 May 2011; 15 years ago 16 November 2026; 3 days ago (Refounding)
- Ground: Estadio Ciro López; Popayán, Colombia
- Capacity: 3,900
- Chairman: Alexander Otero
- Manager: Alejandro Guerrero
- League: Categoría Primera B
- Website: https://universitariopopayan.com.co/
Home colours	Away colours

Universitario Popayán is a professional Colombian football club from the city of Popayán, the capital of the department of Cauca. It was founded on May 21, 2011. The club competed in Categoría Primera B, part of the Colombian professional football league system. It played its final match on May 8, 2019, subsequently transferring its franchise rights to facilitate the re-establishment of Boca Juniors de Cali. The club was re-established on November 16, 2026, and is set to compete in the special Categoría Primera C tournament in 2027.

== History ==
Universitario Popayán was founded in May 2011, after Centauros Villavicencio moved from Villavicencio to Popayán considering Centauros's huge debts, the refusal of financial support from successive local authorities that deemed it a feeder club for Deportes Quindío, and the support expressed from the Cauca Department Governorate for a football club in the department's capital city. Despite the fact that the move was made before the start of the Finalización tournament, the club played for the rest of the year under its former name "Centauros" due to legal issues. They were authorized by Coldeportes to use the name "Universitario de Popayán" from the 2012 season onwards. Starting from that season the club began working in Popayán, as well as forming players in its youth ranks who would go on to play in the Colombian U-19 championships.

The club's history was marked by the continuous exchange of players with Deportes Quindío (which came from the Centauros era), given that the club's owner, Hernando Ángel, was also Deportes Quindío's controlling shareholder and chairman.

On 12 March 2019, the General Assembly of DIMAYOR approved a proposal to relocate Universitario from Popayán to Cali starting from the second half of the 2019 season, with the club being effectively rebranded as Boca Juniors de Cali. Universitario played its last Primera B match under that name on 4 May 2019, losing to Deportivo Pereira in Palmira by a 4–1 score, and its last official game was a 2–1 defeat against América de Cali in the sixth and last matchday of the group stage of the 2019 Copa Colombia on 8 May.

== Affiliated teams ==
- (Colombia) Deportes Quindío
