= Tigres F.C. =

Colombian football club

Tigres
- Full name: Tigres Fútbol Club S.A.
- Nickname: El equipo felino
- Founded: 20 January 2003; 23 years ago as Expreso Rojo de Cartagena; 20 January 2016; 10 years ago as Tigres F.C.
- Ground: Metropolitano de Techo
- Capacity: 10,000
- President: Nelly Páez
- Head coach: Rafael Rodríguez
- League: Categoría Primera B
- 2025: Primera B, 8th of 16
- Website: https://www.tigresfutbolclub.com
Home colours	Away colours

Tigres Fútbol Club is a professional Colombian football team based in Bogotá that plays in the Categoría Primera B. They play their home games at the Metropolitano de Techo stadium.

== History ==
The history of the club began in 2002, when Expreso Palmira was purchased by businessmen who renamed the club Expreso Rojo de Cartagena. The team won the Primera C championship in that same year.

In 2003 the club played its first season in Primera B under the Expreso Rojo name, placing first in the aggregate table but being eliminated in the play-offs. Two years later the club moved to Sincelejo, where they only lasted a year, returning to Cartagena in 2006. In the 2007 season the team moved to the city of Fusagasugá, Cundinamarca.

The club's most notable participation in Colombian football occurred in the 2008 Copa Colombia in which the club reached the semi-finals. Expreso Rojo was eliminated by Once Caldas at that stage, with a 1–0 aggregate score.

In 2009 the team moved to Zipaquirá due to economic problems. For the 2011 season Expreso Rojo decided to move back to Fusagasugá, however due to poor results the club moved once again, this time to Soacha. In 2014 the team moved to Girardot, only to return to Zipaquirá the following year due to the poor state of the playing field in Girardot.

For the following season (2016), the club was renamed as Tigres F.C. due to a ruling by the Superintendency of Industry and Commerce of Colombia stating that the Expreso Rojo brand was already trademarked and linked to top-flight club Independiente Santa Fe and therefore could not be used by any other company. In that season, they earned promotion to Categoría Primera A for the 2017 season by winning Group A in the Primera B semi-finals. They became season runners-up after losing the final to América de Cali on aggregate score. However, they were relegated back to Primera B after only one season in the top flight.

== Kit manufacturer ==
Period	Kit manufacturer
2011	(Colombia) Kimo
2012	(Colombia) FSS
2013	(Colombia) Sport Market
2014–2015	(Colombia) Attlé
2016–	(Colombia) Effort

== Honours ==
=== Domestic ===
- Categoría Primera B
  - Runners-up (1): 2016

== Current squad ==
As of 15 February 2024

Note: Flags indicate national team as defined under FIFA eligibility rules; some limited exceptions apply. Players may hold more than one non-FIFA nationality.

No.	Pos.	Nation	Player
1	GK	COL	Aldo Montes
2	DF	COL	Nicolás Lara
3	DF	COL	Kevin Cárdenas
4	DF	COL	Miguel Pájaro
5	MF	COL	Sebastián Romero
6	DF	COL	Alejandro Lopera
7	MF	COL	Luis Miguel López
8	MF	COL	Tomás Salazar
10	MF	COL	Robert Lara
11	FW	COL	Luis Palacios
13	MF	COL	Andrés Cuadros
14	FW	COL	Orles Aragón

No.	Pos.	Nation	Player
15	DF	COL	Tomás Velásquez
17	MF	COL	Davinson Ibarra (on loan from Santa Fe)
18	DF	COL	David Algarra
19	FW	COL	Hugo Mena
20	MF	COL	Daniel Palacio
21	MF	COL	Dylan Prieto (on loan from Santa Fe)
23	MF	COL	David Barbosa
24	MF	COL	Michael Mahecha
25	DF	COL	Santiago Tamayo (on loan from Santa Fe)
28	MF	COL	César Salguero (captain)
33	GK	COL	Omar Rodríguez (on loan from Santa Fe)

== Managers ==
- (Colombia) Jhon Jairo Bodmer (January 2016 – December 2018)
- (Colombia) Diego Díaz (January 2019 – December 2019)
- (Colombia) Óscar Morera (January 2020 – December 2021)
- (Colombia) Jorge Rojas (January 2022 – September 2023)
- (Colombia) Jorge Castro (September 2023 – June 2025)
- (Colombia) Rafael Rodríguez (July 2025 – present)
