= Estadio Metropolitano de Techo =

Stadium in Bogotá, Colombia

Coordinates: 4.623545°N 74.135611°W

- Techo
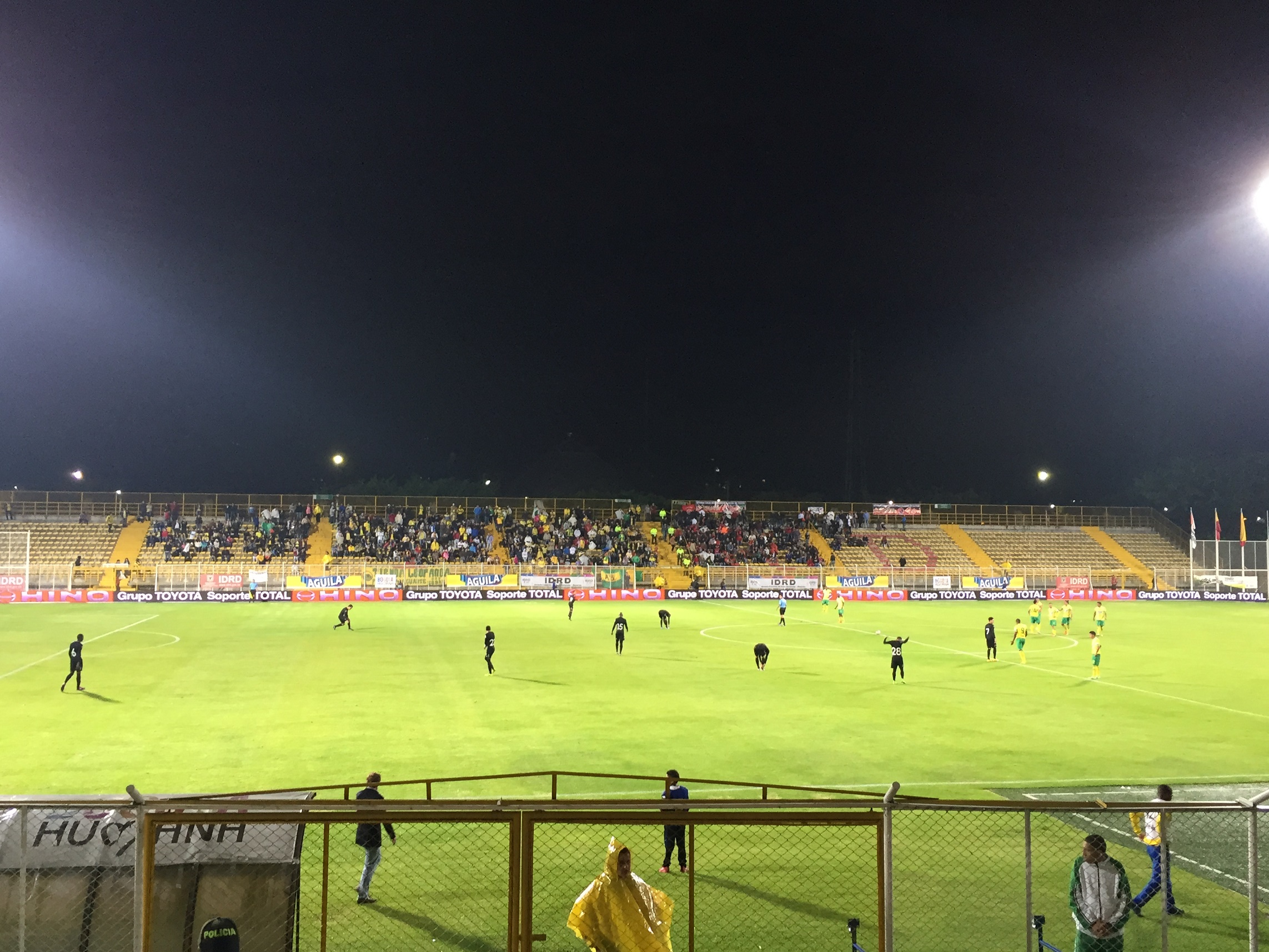
- Interactive map of Estadio Metropolitano de Techo
- Location: Bogotá, Colombia
- Owner: IDRD
- Operator: IDRD
- Capacity: 10,000
- Surface: GrassMaster

Construction
- Opened: 1959
- Renovated: 2010–2011

Tenants
- Bogotá; Fortaleza; Internacional de Bogotá; Tigres

Estadio Metropolitano de Techo is a multi-use stadium in Bogotá, Colombia. It is currently used mostly for football matches and is the home stadium of Internacional de Bogotá, Fortaleza, Tigres F.C., and Bogotá F.C. The stadium holds 10,000 people.
