= 2022 Liga DIMAYOR =

Categoría Primera A season

Liga BetPlay Dimayor
- Season: 2022
- Dates: 20 January – 7 December 2022
- Champions: Apertura: Atlético Nacional (17th title); Finalización: Deportivo Pereira (1st title)
- Relegated: Patriotas; Cortuluá
- Copa Libertadores: Atlético Nacional; Deportivo Pereira; Independiente Medellín; Millonarios (via Copa Colombia)
- Copa Sudamericana: Deportes Tolima; Junior; Santa Fe; Águilas Doradas
- Matches: 451
- Goals: 1,014 (2.25 per match)
- Top goalscorer: Apertura: Dayro Moreno (13 goals); Finalización: Leonardo Castro (15 goals)
- Biggest home win: Ind. Medellín 4–0 Águilas Doradas (1 March); Santa Fe 4–0 Jaguares (30 April); Junior 4–0 Envigado (1 May); Deportivo Pasto 4–0 Envigado (13 July); Alianza Petrolera 4–0 Santa Fe (10 October); América de Cali 4–0 Deportivo Pasto (22 October); Deportivo Pereira 5–1 Santa Fe (27 November)
- Biggest away win: La Equidad 1–5 Ind. Medellín (16 June)
- Highest scoring: Alianza Petrolera 4–4 Deportivo Cali (19 August)

The 2022 Categoría Primera A season (officially known as the 2022 Liga BetPlay Dimayor season for sponsorship reasons) was the 75th season of the Categoría Primera A, Colombia's top-flight football league. The season began on 20 January and ended on 7 December 2022. Deportivo Cali were the defending champions, having won the 2021 Finalización tournament.

Two tournaments (Apertura and Finalización) were played in the season, each one of them being an independent championship. In the Torneo Apertura Atlético Nacional won their seventeenth league title, beating Deportes Tolima in the finals by a 4–3 aggregate score after winning the first leg in Medellín by a 3–1 score and losing the return leg in Ibagué by two goals to one, and in the Torneo Finalización Deportivo Pereira were the champions, winning their first league title after beating Independiente Medellín on penalties following a 1–1 draw on aggregate in the finals.

== Format ==
The competition format for this season was approved by the General Assembly of DIMAYOR on 17 December 2021:

- Two tournaments (Apertura and Finalización) with three stages each were played in the season.
- The first stage of both tournaments was contested on a single round-robin basis, with each team playing the other teams once plus an additional match against a regional rival for a total of 20 games. The top eight teams advanced to the next stage.
- In the second stage, the eight qualified teams were drawn into two groups of four teams each where they played each other team in their group twice for a total of 6 games. Both group winners advanced to the finals.
- The finals in both tournaments were contested by the winners of each semi-final group, playing a double-legged series for the championship.
- Two teams were relegated to Categoría Primera B at the end of the season. The relegation table continued considering the performance of teams over three seasons but starting from this season, the teams promoted from Primera B were not given any records from other teams, meaning that relegation would be based on averages.

== Teams ==
20 teams took part in the season, the top 18 teams from the relegation table of the previous tournament (2021 Finalización) as well as Cortuluá and Unión Magdalena, who were promoted from the second tournament of the 2021 Primera B season. The promoted teams replaced Deportes Quindío and Atlético Huila, the bottom two teams in the relegation table of the 2021 Finalización tournament.

Locations of the 2022 Categoría Primera A teams

=== Stadia and locations ===
Team	Manager	City	Stadium	Capacity
Águilas Doradas	(Colombia) Leonel Álvarez	Rionegro	Alberto Grisales	14,000
Alianza Petrolera	(Colombia) Hubert Bodhert	Barrancabermeja	Daniel Villa Zapata	10,400
América de Cali	(Costa Rica) Alexandre Guimarães	Cali	Pascual Guerrero	33,130
Atlético Bucaramanga	(Argentina) Jorge Ramoa (caretaker)	Bucaramanga	Alfonso López	28,000
Atlético Nacional	(Brazil) Paulo Autuori	Medellín	Atanasio Girardot	40,043
Cortuluá	(Colombia) Fernando Velasco	Tuluá	Doce de Octubre	16,000
Deportes Tolima	(Colombia) Hernán Torres	Ibagué	Manuel Murillo Toro	28,100
Deportivo Cali	(Colombia) Jorge Luis Pinto	Palmira	Deportivo Cali	44,000
Deportivo Pasto	(Colombia) Flabio Torres	Pasto	Departamental Libertad	20,665
Deportivo Pereira	(Colombia) Alejandro Restrepo	Pereira	Hernán Ramírez Villegas	30,297
Envigado	(Colombia) Alberto Suárez	Envigado	Polideportivo Sur	11,000
Independiente Medellín	(Colombia) David González	Medellín	Atanasio Girardot	40,043
Jaguares	(Colombia) Alexis Márquez	Montería	Jaraguay	12,000
Junior	(Colombia) Arturo Reyes	Barranquilla	Metropolitano Roberto Meléndez	49,692
La Equidad	(Colombia) Alexis García	Bogotá	Metropolitano de Techo	8,000
Millonarios	(Colombia) Alberto Gamero	Bogotá	Nemesio Camacho El Campín	36,343
Once Caldas	(Colombia) Diego Corredor	Manizales	Palogrande	28,678
Patriotas	(Colombia) Fabián Torres (caretaker)	Tunja	La Independencia	20,630
Santa Fe	(Uruguay) Alfredo Arias	Bogotá	Nemesio Camacho El Campín	36,343
Unión Magdalena	(Argentina) Claudio Rodríguez	Santa Marta	Sierra Nevada	16,000

=== Managerial changes ===
Team	Outgoing manager	Manner of departure	Date of vacancy	Position in table	Incoming manager	Date of appointment
Torneo Apertura
Águilas Doradas	(Peru) Johan Fano	End of caretaker spell	21 November 2021	Pre-season	(Colombia) Leonel Álvarez	31 December 2021
Santa Fe	(Colombia) Grigori Méndez	Return to U-20 squad	23 November 2021	Pre-season	(Argentina) Martín Cardetti	25 November 2021
Cortuluá	(Colombia) Jaime de la Pava	Resigned	16 December 2021	Pre-season	(Chile) Manuel Suárez Jiménez	3 January 2022
Junior	(Colombia) Arturo Reyes	Sacked	17 December 2021	Pre-season	(Argentina) Juan Cruz Real	20 December 2021
Patriotas	(Colombia) Juan David Niño	Sacked	7 February 2022	18th	(Colombia) Arturo Boyacá	10 February 2022
Atlético Bucaramanga	(Argentina) Néstor Craviotto	Resigned	21 February 2022	17th	(Colombia) Armando Osma	24 February 2022
Atlético Nacional	(Colombia) Alejandro Restrepo	Mutual agreement	28 February 2022	3rd	(Colombia) Hernán Darío Herrera (Note: Originally as caretaker manager, appointed on a permanent basis on 22 June 2022.)	1 March 2022
América de Cali	(Colombia) Juan Carlos Osorio	Mutual agreement	31 March 2022	15th	(Colombia) Pompilio Páez (Note: Caretaker manager.)	31 March 2022
América de Cali	(Colombia) Pompilio Páez	End of caretaker spell	3 April 2022	12th	(Costa Rica) Alexandre Guimarães (Note: Juliano Fontana was the caretaker manager for the Torneo Apertura 15th round match against Atlético Nacional.)	6 April 2022
Unión Magdalena	(Colombia) Carlos Silva	Demoted	12 April 2022	20th	(Argentina) Claudio Rodríguez	12 April 2022
Santa Fe	(Argentina) Martín Cardetti	Mutual agreement	25 April 2022	11th	(Colombia) Grigori Méndez	25 April 2022
Cortuluá	(Chile) Manuel Suárez Jiménez	Sacked	2 May 2022	19th	(Colombia) Fernando Velasco	2 May 2022
Jaguares	(Colombia) César Torres	Mutual agreement	14 May 2022	11th	(Colombia) Grigori Méndez	27 May 2022
Deportivo Pereira	(Colombia) Alexis Márquez	Resigned	14 May 2022	14th	(Colombia) Alejandro Restrepo	20 May 2022
Cortuluá	(Colombia) Fernando Velasco	End of caretaker spell	14 May 2022	18th	(Colombia) César Torres	24 May 2022
Patriotas	(Colombia) Arturo Boyacá	End of contract	18 May 2022	17th	(Colombia) José Eugenio Hernández	6 June 2022
Santa Fe	(Colombia) Grigori Méndez	End of caretaker spell	19 May 2022	10th	(Uruguay) Alfredo Arias	19 May 2022
Independiente Medellín	(Uruguay) Julio Comesaña	Mutual agreement	17 June 2022	2nd, Group B	(Colombia) David González	28 June 2022
Torneo Finalización
Deportivo Cali	(Venezuela) Rafael Dudamel	Mutual agreement	1 July 2022	Pre-tournament	(Colombia) Mayer Candelo (Note: Ítalo Cervino was the caretaker manager for the second leg of the 2022 Copa Sudamericana round of 16.)	9 July 2022
Atlético Nacional	(Colombia) Hernán Darío Herrera	Return to youth categories	6 September 2022	9th	(Colombia) Pedro Sarmiento	6 September 2022
Junior	(Argentina) Juan Cruz Real	Sacked	11 September 2022	10th	(Uruguay) Julio Comesaña	11 September 2022
Jaguares	(Colombia) Grigori Méndez	Resigned	13 September 2022	16th	(Colombia) Alexis Márquez	13 September 2022
Cortuluá	(Colombia) César Torres	Resigned	18 September 2022	20th	(Colombia) Fernando Velasco	19 September 2022
Deportivo Cali	(Colombia) Mayer Candelo	Mutual agreement	22 September 2022	20th	(Colombia) Sergio Angulo	22 September 2022
Patriotas	(Colombia) José Eugenio Hernández	Resigned	30 September 2022	18th	(Colombia) Fabián Torres (Note: Caretaker manager until the end of the season.)	1 October 2022
Deportivo Cali	(Colombia) Sergio Angulo	End of caretaker spell	2 October 2022	20th	(Colombia) Jorge Luis Pinto	1 October 2022
Atlético Bucaramanga	(Colombia) Armando Osma	Sacked	10 October 2022	13th	(Argentina) Jorge Ramoa	10 October 2022
Atlético Nacional	(Colombia) Pedro Sarmiento	End of caretaker spell	13 October 2022	4th	(Brazil) Paulo Autuori	3 October 2022
Junior	(Uruguay) Julio Comesaña	Sacked	17 November 2022	4th, Group A	(Colombia) Arturo Reyes	18 November 2022

== Torneo Apertura ==
=== First stage ===
==== Standings ====
Pos	Team	Pld	W	D	L	GF	GA	GD	Pts	Qualification
1	Millonarios	20	13	3	4	23	11	+12	42	Advance to the semi-finals
2	Deportes Tolima	20	12	4	4	29	14	+15	40	Advance to the semi-finals
3	Atlético Nacional	20	10	6	4	26	15	+11	36	Advance to the semi-finals
4	Independiente Medellín	20	10	4	6	25	19	+6	34	Advance to the semi-finals
5	Junior	20	10	2	8	30	21	+9	32	Advance to the semi-finals
6	Envigado	20	8	7	5	22	21	+1	31	Advance to the semi-finals
7	La Equidad	20	7	9	4	21	16	+5	30	Advance to the semi-finals
8	Atlético Bucaramanga	20	8	5	7	27	25	+2	29	Advance to the semi-finals
9	Alianza Petrolera	20	7	8	5	22	20	+2	29	
10	Santa Fe	20	7	6	7	29	26	+3	27	
11	Jaguares	20	8	3	9	26	29	−3	27	
12	Once Caldas	20	6	8	6	18	18	0	26	
13	Águilas Doradas	20	7	4	9	17	26	−9	25	
14	Deportivo Pereira	20	6	5	9	21	26	−5	23	
15	América de Cali	20	6	5	9	20	25	−5	23	
16	Deportivo Pasto	20	5	7	8	16	20	−4	22	
17	Patriotas	20	5	6	9	19	23	−4	21	
18	Cortuluá	20	5	5	10	21	27	−6	20	
19	Deportivo Cali	20	4	6	10	14	24	−10	18	
20	Unión Magdalena	20	2	5	13	8	28	−20	11	

Source: Dimayor, Soccerway
Rules for classification: 1) Points, 2) Goal difference, 3) Goals for, 4) Away goals for, 5) Away goals against, 6) Effective time of play, 7) Drawing of lots.

==== Results ====
Home \ Away	AGU	ALI	AME	BUC	NAC	COR	TOL	CAL	PAS	PER	ENV	DIM	JAG	JUN	EQU	MIL	ONC	PAT	SFE	MAG
Águilas Doradas	—	—	2–0	1–1	1–0	2–2	—	—	1–0	1–0	1–2	—	1–1	—	—	—	1–1	1–0	—	—
Alianza Petrolera	2–1	—	—	2–2	—	0–0	0–2	—	—	2–1	2–2	1–1	2–0	—	—	—	2–0	2–1	—	—
América de Cali	—	0–1	—	3–0	—	—	—	1–1	—	—	1–0	1–3	—	—	1–1	3–2	2–0	—	2–2	1–0
Atlético Bucaramanga	—	2–1	—	—	3–1	3–2	—	1–0	0–1	—	1–2	2–3	1–0	—	—	0–0	—	1–1	—	—
Atlético Nacional	—	0–0	2–0	—	—	—	0–1	—	—	1–1	—	2–0	3–1	3–1	—	—	0–0	—	2–1	1–0
Cortuluá	—	—	2–0	—	1–1	—	1–3	—	0–1	2–1	1–1	—	—	1–0	0–2	—	—	1–0	1–1	—
Deportes Tolima	3–0	—	1–0	2–1	—	3–2	—	—	0–1	—	1–1	—	—	0–2	—	—	—	1–2	3–0	2–1
Deportivo Cali	0–1	1–1	0–1	—	3–3	2–1	0–1	—	—	1–0	—	—	—	1–1	—	0–2	—	—	1–1	—
Deportivo Pasto	—	1–1	3–1	—	0–1	—	—	2–0	—	2–2	—	—	1–1	—	1–1	0–1	—	0–0	2–4	—
Deportivo Pereira	—	—	1–1	0–3	—	—	0–2	—	—	—	—	1–1	2–1	1–0	2–3	1–0	0–1	—	—	2–0
Envigado	1–0	—	—	—	1–2	—	—	1–0	1–0	2–1	—	—	3–1	—	1–1	0–0	1–1	—	1–0	—
Independiente Medellín	4–0	—	—	—	0–0	3–1	1–0	2–0	1–0	—	2–1	—	—	2–0	—	1–0	—	—	—	0–0
Jaguares	—	—	1–1	—	—	2–1	0–2	2–1	1–0	—	—	3–0 (Note: Match awarded to Jaguares by walkover since Independiente Medellín did not travel to play due to security concerns.)	—	—	—	1–2	2–1	3–1	—	2–0
Junior	2–1	3–1	1–0	2–0	—	—	—	—	1–1	—	4–0	—	2–4	—	1–0	—	—	3–1	—	3–1
La Equidad	0–1	2–1	—	1–1	1–0	—	0–0	0–0	—	—	—	2–0	1–0	—	—	—	1–2	1–1	—	—
Millonarios	2–0	1–0	—	—	0–2	1–0	0–0	—	—	—	—	—	—	1–0	2–1	—	1–0	—	2–1	1–0
Once Caldas	—	—	—	0–1	—	1–0	2–2	0–1	3–0	0–0	—	2–1	—	1–0	—	—	—	—	2–2	1–1
Patriotas	—	—	2–1	—	0–2	—	—	3–0	—	2–3	0–0	2–0	—	—	0–1	1–2	0–0	—	1–1	—
Santa Fe	3–0	0–1	—	3–1	—	—	—	—	—	1–2	—	1–0	4–0	2–1	1–1	0–3	—	—	—	1–0
Unión Magdalena	2–1	0–0	—	0–3 (Note: Match abandoned after 78 minutes of play and awarded to Atlético Bucaramanga due to crowd disturbances by Unión Magdalena fans. The score at the time of suspension was 0–1.)	—	0–2	—	0–2	0–0	—	2–1	—	—	0–3 (Note: Match abandoned after 75 minutes of play and awarded to Junior due to crowd disturbances. The score at the time of suspension was 1–1.)	1–1	—	—	0–1	—	—

Source: Dimayor, Soccerway
Legend: Blue = home team win; Yellow = draw; Red = away team win.

=== Semi-finals ===
The eight teams that advanced to the semi-finals were drawn into two groups of four teams, with the top two teams from the first stage being seeded in each group. The two group winners advanced to the finals.

==== Group A ====
Pos	Team	Pld	W	D	L	GF	GA	GD	Pts	Qualification	NAC	JUN	MIL	BUC
1	Atlético Nacional	6	3	3	0	10	5	+5	12	Advance to the Finals	—	2–1	2–2	4–1
2	Junior	6	2	2	2	5	6	−1	8		1–1	—	2–1	1–0
3	Millonarios	6	1	3	2	5	6	−1	6 (Note: First stage position: Millonarios 1st, Atlético Bucaramanga 8th.)		0–0	0–0	—	1–0
4	Atlético Bucaramanga	6	2	0	4	5	8	−3	6		0–1	2–0	2–1	—

Source: Dimayor, Soccerway
Legend: Blue = home team win; Yellow = draw; Red = away team win.
Rules for classification: 1) Points, 2) First stage position.

==== Group B ====
Pos	Team	Pld	W	D	L	GF	GA	GD	Pts	Qualification	TOL	DIM	EQU	ENV
1	Deportes Tolima	6	4	1	1	7	2	+5	13	Advance to the Finals	—	0–0	1–0	1–0
2	Independiente Medellín	6	3	2	1	9	3	+6	11		0–1	—	2–0	2–1
3	La Equidad	6	3	0	3	7	8	−1	9		1–0	1–5	—	2–0
4	Envigado	6	0	1	5	2	12	−10	1		1–4	0–0	0–3	—

Source: Dimayor, Soccerway
Legend: Blue = home team win; Yellow = draw; Red = away team win.
Rules for classification: 1) Points, 2) First stage position.

=== Finals ===
22 June 2022
20:00 UTC−5

Atlético Nacional	3–1	Deportes Tolima
Banguero 43'; Candelo 71'; Andrade 90+3'	Report	Plata 23'

Estadio Atanasio Girardot, Medellín
Referee: Éder Vergara

26 June 2022
19:00 UTC−5

Deportes Tolima	2–1	Atlético Nacional
Olivera 18' (o.g.); Caicedo 36'	Report	Barrera 90+1'

Estadio Manuel Murillo Toro, Ibagué
Referee: Andrés Rojas

Atlético Nacional won 4–3 on aggregate.

=== Top scorers ===
Rank	Name	Club	Goals
1	(Colombia) Dayro Moreno	Atlético Bucaramanga	13
2	(Colombia) Luis Carlos Ruiz	Cortuluá	11
3	(Colombia) Miguel Borja	Junior	10
3	(Colombia) Wilson Morelo	Santa Fe	10
3	(Argentina) Luciano Pons	Independiente Medellín	10
6	(Colombia) Leonardo Castro	Deportivo Pereira	9
7	(Colombia) Jefferson Duque	Atlético Nacional	8
7	(Colombia) Duvier Riascos	Deportivo Pasto	8
9	(Colombia) Pablo Sabbag	La Equidad	7

Source: Soccerway

== Torneo Finalización ==
=== First stage ===
==== Standings ====
Pos	Team	Pld	W	D	L	GF	GA	GD	Pts	Qualification
1	Santa Fe	20	10	4	6	25	26	−1	34	Advance to the semi-finals
2	Águilas Doradas	20	8	9	3	23	15	+8	33	Advance to the semi-finals
3	Independiente Medellín	20	9	6	5	30	25	+5	33	Advance to the semi-finals
4	Millonarios	20	9	5	6	29	19	+10	32	Advance to the semi-finals
5	Deportivo Pereira	20	9	5	6	26	21	+5	32	Advance to the semi-finals
6	Deportivo Pasto	20	9	5	6	24	23	+1	32	Advance to the semi-finals
7	América de Cali	20	7	10	3	21	11	+10	31	Advance to the semi-finals
8	Junior	20	9	4	7	24	19	+5	31	Advance to the semi-finals
9	Atlético Nacional	20	7	9	4	31	25	+6	30	
10	Once Caldas	20	7	9	4	21	18	+3	30	
11	Atlético Bucaramanga	20	9	3	8	26	25	+1	30	
12	Unión Magdalena	20	8	5	7	23	28	−5	29	
13	La Equidad	20	6	10	4	28	27	+1	28	
14	Deportes Tolima	20	6	8	6	23	22	+1	26	
15	Envigado	20	7	5	8	22	22	0	26	
16	Jaguares	20	4	8	8	14	20	−6	20	
17	Alianza Petrolera	20	4	5	11	24	32	−8	17	
18	Deportivo Cali	20	3	7	10	22	35	−13	16	
19	Patriotas	20	3	6	11	21	28	−7	15	
20	Cortuluá	20	2	5	13	12	28	−16	11	

Source: Dimayor, Soccerway
Rules for classification: 1) Points, 2) Goal difference, 3) Goals for, 4) Away goals for, 5) Away goals against, 6) Effective time of play, 7) Drawing of lots.

==== Results ====
Home \ Away	AGU	ALI	AME	BUC	NAC	COR	TOL	CAL	PAS	PER	ENV	DIM	JAG	JUN	EQU	MIL	ONC	PAT	SFE	MAG
Águilas Doradas	—	1–0	—	—	—	—	1–2	2–2	—	—	1–0	3–0	—	1–1	3–0	0–0	—	—	2–2	2–0
Alianza Petrolera	—	—	0–2	3–1	0–2	—	—	4–4	0–0	—	—	—	—	0–1	1–2	2–4	—	—	4–0	0–1
América de Cali	2–0	—	—	—	0–0	1–1	0–0	1–0	4–0	0–1	—	—	1–1	2–1	—	—	—	2–0	—	—
Atlético Bucaramanga	0–1	3–1	0–2	—	—	—	2–1	—	—	1–3	—	—	—	0–1	3–1	—	0–0	—	2–1	1–0
Atlético Nacional	1–1	—	—	3–2	—	1–1	—	3–0	3–1	—	1–1	3–2	—	—	1–1	1–2	—	1–0	—	—
Cortuluá	0–0	0–2	—	0–2	—	—	0–1	2–0	—	—	—	1–0	0–1	—	—	1–4	0–1	—	—	1–2
Deportes Tolima	—	2–0	—	—	2–2	0–0	—	2–0	—	1–3	—	1–1	2–2	—	1–1	1–0	1–0	—	—	—
Deportivo Cali	—	—	1–0	1–1	—	—	—	—	2–0	—	0–3	2–2	2–2	—	1–2	—	1–1	1–0	—	2–2
Deportivo Pasto	1–1	—	—	1–0	—	1–0	2–1	—	—	—	4–0	0–0	2–1	2–1	—	—	2–0	—	—	1–2
Deportivo Pereira	2–2	1–2	—	—	1–1	2–1	—	2–1	2–0	—	0–2	—	—	—	—	—	1–1	2–0	0–1	—
Envigado	0–1	2–2	0–0	2–1	—	3–2	1–1	—	—	—	—	1–2	—	2–0	—	—	—	3–2	—	1–2
Independiente Medellín	—	3–1	2–0	1–2	4–3	—	—	—	—	2–1	—	—	0–0	—	1–1	—	1–1	1–0	2–0	—
Jaguares	0–0	2–1	—	0–1	0–1	—	—	—	0–1	1–2	0–0	—	—	0–2	1–1	—	—	—	2–1	—
Junior	—	—	—	—	3–1	2–1	2–1	1–0	—	0–0	—	4–2	—	—	—	0–1	1–2	—	2–0	1–1
La Equidad	—	—	0–0	—	—	1–1	—	—	2–3	1–1	0–1	—	—	0–0	—	1–0	—	4–3	2–2	4–1
Millonarios	—	—	2–2	0–0	—	—	—	4–2	1–1	0–1	1–0	1–2	2–0	—	—	—	—	0–0	2–0	—
Once Caldas	2–0	1–1	1–1	—	1–0	—	—	—	—	2–1	1–0	—	0–1	—	1–1	2–1	—	1–1	—	—
Patriotas	0–1	0–0	—	3–4	—	3–0	1–1	—	1–1	—	—	—	0–0	1–0	2–3	—	—	—	—	3–1
Santa Fe	—	—	1–1	—	1–1	1–0	2–1	1–0	2–1	—	1–0	—	—	—	—	3–2	2–1	2–1	—	—
Unión Magdalena	—	—	0–0	—	2–2	—	2–1	—	—	2–0	—	0–2	1–0	2–1	—	0–2	2–2	—	0–2	—

Source: Dimayor, Soccerway
Legend: Blue = home team win; Yellow = draw; Red = away team win.

=== Semi-finals ===
The eight teams that advanced to the semi-finals were drawn into two groups of four teams, with the top two teams from the first stage being seeded in each group. The two group winners advanced to the finals.

==== Group A ====
Pos	Team	Pld	W	D	L	GF	GA	GD	Pts	Qualification	PER	MIL	SFE	JUN
1	Deportivo Pereira	6	4	0	2	13	9	+4	12	Advance to the Finals	—	2–1	5–1	4–3
2	Millonarios	6	3	2	1	7	4	+3	11		2–0	—	1–1	1–0
3	Santa Fe	6	2	3	1	8	9	−1	9		2–0	1–1	—	0–0
4	Junior	6	0	1	5	5	11	−6	1		0–2	0–1	2–3	—

Source: Dimayor, Soccerway
Legend: Blue = home team win; Yellow = draw; Red = away team win.
Rules for classification: 1) Points, 2) First stage position.

==== Group B ====
Pos	Team	Pld	W	D	L	GF	GA	GD	Pts	Qualification	DIM	AGU	PAS	AME
1	Independiente Medellín	6	3	2	1	6	3	+3	11	Advance to the Finals	—	2–1	0–0	2–1
2	Águilas Doradas	6	3	1	2	9	7	+2	10		1–0	—	3–4	2–0
3	Deportivo Pasto	6	2	2	2	6	6	0	8		0–0	0–1	—	1–0
4	América de Cali	6	1	1	4	4	9	−5	4		0–2	1–1	2–1	—

Source: Dimayor, Soccerway
Legend: Blue = home team win; Yellow = draw; Red = away team win.
Rules for classification: 1) Points, 2) First stage position.

=== Finals ===
4 December 2022
18:00 UTC−5

Independiente Medellín	1–1	Deportivo Pereira
Cambindo 38'	Report	Castro 42'

Estadio Atanasio Girardot, Medellín
Attendance: 42,910
Referee: Carlos Betancur

7 December 2022
19:00 UTC−5

Deportivo Pereira	0–0	Independiente Medellín
	Report
Penalties
Ramírez (penalty missed); Castro (penalty scored); Medina (penalty scored); Zuluaga (penalty scored); Berrío (penalty scored)	4–3	(penalty missed) Cadavid; (penalty missed) Arregui; (penalty scored) Hernández; (penalty scored) Pardo; (penalty scored) Marrugo

Estadio Hernán Ramírez Villegas, Pereira
Referee: Carlos Ortega

Tied 1–1 on aggregate, Deportivo Pereira won on penalties.

=== Top scorers ===
Rank	Name	Club	Goals
1	(Colombia) Leonardo Castro	Deportivo Pereira	15
2	(Colombia) Marco Pérez	Águilas Doradas	12
3	(Colombia) Diber Cambindo	Independiente Medellín	11
3	(Colombia) Jefferson Duque	Atlético Nacional	11
5	(Colombia) Carlos Bacca	Junior	9
5	(Colombia) Ricardo Márquez	Unión Magdalena	9
5	(Colombia) Wilson Morelo	Santa Fe	9
5	(Colombia) Dayro Moreno	Atlético Bucaramanga	9
9	(Colombia) Ayron del Valle	Once Caldas	8
9	(Colombia) Andrey Estupiñán	Santa Fe	8
9	(Venezuela) Jesús Hernández	Envigado	8
9	(Colombia) Carlos Ramírez	Deportivo Pereira	8
9	(Colombia) Pablo Sabbag	La Equidad	8

Source: Soccerway

== Aggregate table ==
Pos	Team	Pld	W	D	L	GF	GA	GD	Pts	Qualification
1	Millonarios	52	26	13	13	64	40	+24	91	Qualification for Copa Libertadores second stage (Note: Millonarios qualified for the Copa Libertadores second stage by winning the 2022 Copa Colombia.)
2	Independiente Medellín	54	25	16	13	71	51	+20	91	Qualification for Copa Libertadores second stage
3	Deportes Tolima	48	23	13	12	62	42	+20	82	Qualification for Copa Sudamericana first stage
4	Atlético Nacional (C)	48	21	18	9	71	48	+23	81	Qualification for Copa Libertadores group stage
5	Junior	52	21	9	22	64	57	+7	72	Qualification for Copa Sudamericana first stage
6	Santa Fe	46	19	13	14	62	61	+1	70	Qualification for Copa Sudamericana first stage
7	Deportivo Pereira (C)	48	19	12	17	61	57	+4	69	Qualification for Copa Libertadores group stage
8	Águilas Doradas	46	18	14	14	49	48	+1	68	Qualification for Copa Sudamericana first stage
9	La Equidad	46	16	19	11	56	51	+5	67	
10	Atlético Bucaramanga	46	19	8	19	58	58	0	65	
11	Deportivo Pasto	46	16	14	16	46	49	−3	62	
12	América de Cali	46	14	16	16	45	45	0	58	
13	Envigado	46	15	13	18	46	55	−9	58	
14	Once Caldas	40	13	17	10	39	36	+3	56	
15	Jaguares	40	12	11	17	40	49	−9	47	
16	Alianza Petrolera	40	11	13	16	46	52	−6	46	
17	Unión Magdalena	40	10	10	20	31	56	−25	40	
18	Patriotas	40	8	12	20	40	51	−11	36	
19	Deportivo Cali	40	7	13	20	36	59	−23	34	
20	Cortuluá	40	7	10	23	33	55	−22	31	

Source: Dimayor
Rules for classification: 1) Points, 2) Goal difference, 3) Goals for, 4) Away goals for, 5) Away goals against, 6) Yellow cards, 7) Red cards, 8) Drawing of lots.
(C) Champions

== Relegation ==
A separate table was kept to determine the teams that are relegated to the Categoría Primera B for the next season. This table was elaborated from a sum of all first stage games played in the three most recent seasons (including the 2020, 2021–I, 2021–II, 2022–I, and 2022–II tournaments), with the points earned being averaged per match played. The bottom two teams of the relegation table at the end of the season were relegated to Categoría Primera B.

Pos	Team	2020 Pts	2021 Pts	2022 Pts	2022 GF	2022 GA	2022 GD	Total Pld	Total Pts	Avg.	Relegation
1	Atlético Nacional	35	76	66	57	40	17	98	177	1.81	
2	Millonarios	30	69	74	52	30	22	98	173	1.77	
3	Deportes Tolima	37	66	66	52	36	16	98	169	1.72	
4	Santa Fe	40	58	61	54	52	2	98	159	1.62	
5	Junior	33	62	63	54	40	14	98	158	1.61	
6	La Equidad	32	55	58	49	43	6	98	145	1.48	
7	América de Cali	33	58	54	41	36	5	98	145	1.48	
8	Independiente Medellín	20	52	67	55	44	11	98	139	1.42	
9	Atlético Bucaramanga	21	51	59	53	50	3	98	131	1.34	
10	Deportivo Cali	34	62	34	36	59	–23	98	130	1.33	
11	Águilas Doradas	31	39	58	40	41	–1	98	128	1.31	
12	Deportivo Pasto	34	39	54	40	43	–3	98	127	1.3	
13	Envigado	23	44	57	44	43	1	98	124	1.27	
14	Deportivo Pereira	18	51	55	47	47	0	98	124	1.27	
15	Once Caldas	29	37	56	39	36	3	98	122	1.24	
16	Jaguares	17	52	47	40	49	–9	98	116	1.18	
17	Alianza Petrolera	19	37	46	46	52	–6	98	102	1.04	
18	Unión Magdalena	—	—	40	31	56	–25	40	40	1	
19	Patriotas (R)	17	35	36	40	51	–11	98	88	0.9	Relegation to Categoría Primera B
20	Cortuluá (R)	—	—	31	33	55	–22	40	31	0.78	Relegation to Categoría Primera B

Source: Dimayor
Rules for classification: 1) average, 2) 2022 points, 3) goal difference, 4) goals scored, 5) away goals scored, 6) away goals against, 7) wins, 8) yellow cards, 9) red cards, 10) drawing of lots.

== See also ==
- 2022 Categoría Primera B season
- 2022 Copa Colombia
