= 2022 Copa Colombia =

Copa BetPlay Dimayor 2022
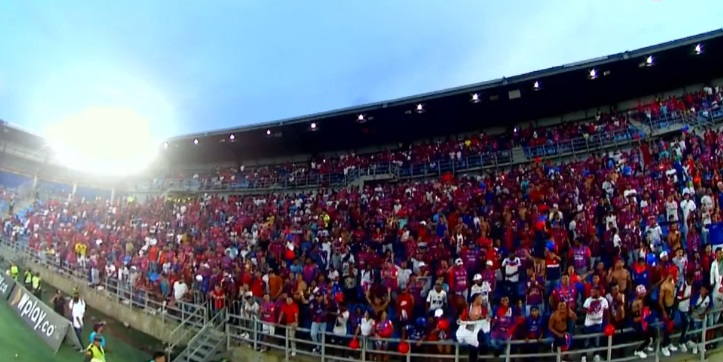
- Union Magdalena vs. Junior, Semi-finals match

Tournament details
- Country: Colombia
- Dates: 9 February – 2 November 2022
- Teams: 35

Final positions
- Champions: Millonarios (3rd title)
- Runners-up: Junior
- Copa Libertadores: Millonarios

Tournament statistics
- Matches played: 68
- Goals scored: 139 (2.04 per match)
- Top goal scorer: Diego Herazo (3 goals)

The 2022 Copa Colombia, officially the Copa BetPlay Dimayor 2022 for sponsorship reasons, was the 20th edition of the Copa Colombia, the national cup competition for clubs affiliated to DIMAYOR, the governing body of professional club football in Colombia. The tournament, which was contested by 35 teams, began on 9 February 2022 and ended on 2 November 2022.

Millonarios won their third title in the competition, after beating Junior in the double-legged final by a 2–1 aggregate score. As Copa Colombia champions, Millonarios qualified for the 2023 Copa Libertadores. Atlético Nacional were the defending champions, having won the competition in the previous edition, but were knocked out by Junior in the quarter-finals.

== Format ==
The format for the 2022 Copa Colombia was similar to the one used in the previous two editions, with the competition being played in a double-legged, single-elimination format in its entirety, without any group stages. Fourteen out of the 15 Categoría Primera B teams entered the competition in the first stage and were drawn into seven ties, except for Boyacá Chicó who received a bye to the second stage for being the best-placed team in the aggregate table of the 2021–II Primera B tournament. After two stages, four Primera B teams qualified for the third stage, along with the 12 Categoría Primera A teams that failed to qualify for international competition, which entered the cup at that stage. Finally, in the round of 16, the eight third stage winners were joined by the four Copa Libertadores qualifiers (Deportes Tolima, Deportivo Cali, Millonarios, and Atlético Nacional) and the four Copa Sudamericana qualifiers (Junior, América de Cali, La Equidad, and Independiente Medellín), which entered the competition at this point.

== Schedule ==
The schedule of the competition was as follows:

Round	Draw date	First leg	Second leg
First stage	3 January 2022	9–10 February 2022	23–24 February 2022
Second stage	3 January 2022	2–3 March 2022	15–17 March 2022
Third stage	3 January 2022	30–31 March and 6 April 2022	6–14 April 2022
Round of 16	8 April 2022	20–21 April 2022	11–12 May 2022
Quarter-finals	8 April 2022	27–28 July 2022	17–18 August 2022
Semi-finals	8 April 2022	24 August 2022	7–14 September 2022
Finals	8 April 2022	28 September 2022	2 November 2022 (originally 5 October 2022)

== First stage ==
The first stage was played by 14 Categoría Primera B clubs, eight of which were seeded in the ties according to their placement in the 2021–II season aggregate table. The remaining Primera B clubs were drawn into each tie. The seeded clubs (Team 2) hosted the second leg.

Team 1	Agg.	Team 2	1st leg	2nd leg
Boca Juniors (2)	0–2	Fortaleza (2)	0–1	0–1
Tigres (2)	3–1	Leones (2)	2–0	1–1
Deportes Quindío (2)	3–2	Bogotá (2)	1–0	2–2
Orsomarso (2)	0–2	Llaneros (2)	0–0	0–2
Atlético Huila (2)	1–0	Real Cartagena (2)	1–0	0–0
Valledupar (2)	1–1 (4–3 p)	Atlético (2)	1–1	0–0
Real Santander (2)	3–0	Barranquilla (2)	3–0	0–0

=== First leg ===
9 February 2022	Valledupar	1–1	Atlético	Valledupar
14:00 UTC−5	Montes 59' (pen.)	Report	Arenas 7'	Stadium: Armando Maestre Pavajeau; Referee: Juan Mira

9 February 2022	Real Santander	3–0	Barranquilla	Piedecuesta
14:10 UTC−5	Liñán 33'; Ramírez 40', 76'	Report		Stadium: Villa Concha; Referee: Luis Delgado

9 February 2022	Boca Juniors	0–1	Fortaleza	Cali
15:00 UTC−5		Report	Cortés 50'	Stadium: Pascual Guerrero; Referee: Liz Mair Suárez

9 February 2022	Tigres	2–0	Leones	Bogotá
17:30 UTC−5	Mejía 83'; Palacios 90+1'	Report		Stadium: Metropolitano de Techo; Referee: Jonathan Ortiz

10 February 2022	Orsomarso	0–0	Llaneros	Palmira
15:00 UTC−5		Report		Stadium: Francisco Rivera Escobar; Referee: Ferney Ossa

10 February 2022	Deportes Quindío	1–0	Bogotá	Armenia
18:00 UTC−5	Guerrero 61'	Report		Stadium: Centenario; Referee: José Ortiz

10 February 2022	Atlético Huila	1–0	Real Cartagena	Neiva
20:00 UTC−5	Sarria 60'	Report		Stadium: Guillermo Plazas Alcid; Referee: David Espinosa

=== Second leg ===
23 February 2022	Atlético	0–0 (1–1 agg.) (3–4 p)	Valledupar	Palmira
14:00 UTC−5		Report		Stadium: Deportivo Cali; Referee: David Espinosa

23 February 2022	Leones	1–1 (1–3 agg.)	Tigres	Itagüí
15:00 UTC−5	Rivas 78'	Report	Palacio 85'	Stadium: Metropolitano Ciudad de Itagüí; Referee: Brayan Liévano

23 February 2022	Llaneros	2–0 (2–0 agg.)	Orsomarso	Cartagena
15:00 UTC−5	Sinisterra 58'; Echeverri 66'	Report		Stadium: Jaime Morón León; Referee: José Ortiz

23 February 2022	Barranquilla	0–0 (0–3 agg.)	Real Santander	Barranquilla
16:00 UTC−5		Report		Stadium: Metropolitano Roberto Meléndez; Referee: Snaider Pontón

23 February 2022	Fortaleza	1–0 (2–0 agg.)	Boca Juniors	Bogotá
17:00 UTC−5	Cortés 15'	Report		Stadium: Metropolitano de Techo; Referee: Kevin Báez

24 February 2022	Bogotá	2–2 (2–3 agg.)	Deportes Quindío	Bogotá
17:30 UTC−5	Mejía 21'; Londoño 55'	Report	Hurtado 10' (o.g.); Carabalí 72'	Stadium: Metropolitano de Techo; Referee: Juan Mira

24 February 2022	Real Cartagena	0–0 (0–1 agg.)	Atlético Huila	Cartagena
20:00 UTC−5		Report		Stadium: Jaime Morón León; Referee: Luis Delgado

== Second stage ==
The second stage was played by the seven first stage winners as well as Boyacá Chicó, who were seeded into this stage. In each tie, the clubs with the best performance in the first stage hosted the second leg.

Team 1	Agg.	Team 2	1st leg	2nd leg
Boyacá Chicó (2)	1–3	Real Santander (2)	0–1	1–2
Valledupar (2)	1–3	Fortaleza (2)	0–2	1–1
Atlético Huila (2)	0–4	Tigres (2)	0–2	0–2
Deportes Quindío (2)	3–2	Llaneros (2)	3–0	0–2

=== First leg ===
2 March 2022	Valledupar	0–2	Fortaleza	Valledupar
16:00 UTC−5		Report	Lemos 32'; Narváez 90+4'	Stadium: Armando Maestre Pavajeau; Referee: Juan Mira

2 March 2022	Boyacá Chicó	0–1	Real Santander	Tunja
18:00 UTC−5		Report	Arboleda 54' (o.g.)	Stadium: La Independencia; Referee: Néver Manjarrés

3 March 2022	Atlético Huila	0–2	Tigres	Neiva
17:30 UTC−5		Report	Marcus Vinícius 8'; Zúñiga 86'	Stadium: Guillermo Plazas Alcid; Referee: Camilo Colmenares

3 March 2022	Deportes Quindío	3–0	Llaneros	Armenia
19:40 UTC−5	Castillo 29'; Barrios 38'; Mina 62'	Report		Stadium: Centenario; Referee: Lisandro Castillo

=== Second leg ===
15 March 2022	Real Santander	2–1 (3–1 agg.)	Boyacá Chicó	Piedecuesta
14:00 UTC−5	Liñán 14'; Rivera 57' (pen.)	Report	Plazas 89'	Stadium: Villa Concha; Referee: Diego Ulloa

15 March 2022	Tigres	2–0 (4–0 agg.)	Atlético Huila	Bogotá
19:40 UTC−5	Zúñiga 49'; Salazar 69'	Report		Stadium: Metropolitano de Techo; Referee: Liz Mair Suárez

17 March 2022	Llaneros	2–0 (2–3 agg.)	Deportes Quindío	Villavicencio
15:00 UTC−5	Sierra 19'; Álvarez 30'	Report		Stadium: Bello Horizonte; Referee: Snaider Pontón

17 March 2022	Fortaleza	1–1 (3–1 agg.)	Valledupar	Bogotá
17:30 UTC−5	Cuperman 18'	Report	Ramírez 32'	Stadium: Metropolitano de Techo; Referee: José Ortiz

== Third stage ==
The third stage was played by the four second stage winners and the 12 Categoría Primera A clubs that did not qualify for international competition, which were seeded in the ties according to their placement in the 2021 season aggregate table. The four second stage winners as well as the four best teams according to the 2021 Primera A aggregate table hosted the second leg.

Team 1	Agg.	Team 2	1st leg	2nd leg
Unión Magdalena (1)	8–2	Real Santander (2)	3–1	5–1
Cortuluá (1)	0–2	Fortaleza (2)	0–1	0–1
Patriotas (1)	0–1	Tigres (2)	0–0	0–1
Once Caldas (1)	1–0	Deportes Quindío (2)	0–0	1–0
Deportivo Pasto (1)	0–4	Santa Fe (1)	0–1	0–3
Águilas Doradas (1)	2–2 (3–4 p)	Deportivo Pereira (1)	0–1	2–1
Alianza Petrolera (1)	2–3	Jaguares (1)	1–1	1–2
Envigado (1)	0–3	Atlético Bucaramanga (1)	0–0	0–3

=== First leg ===
30 March 2022	Envigado	0–0	Atlético Bucaramanga	Envigado
14:00 UTC−5		Report		Stadium: Polideportivo Sur; Referee: Lisandro Castillo

30 March 2022	Unión Magdalena	3–1	Real Santander	Santa Marta
15:00 UTC−5	González 30'; Gómez 35'; Vanegas 88'	Report	Salas 41'	Stadium: Sierra Nevada; Referee: Luis Matorel

30 March 2022	Cortuluá	0–1	Fortaleza	Tuluá
15:30 UTC−5		Report	Aladesanmi 21'	Stadium: Doce de Octubre; Referee: Kéiner Jiménez

30 March 2022	Patriotas	0–0	Tigres	Tunja
16:00 UTC−5		Report		Stadium: La Independencia; Referee: Luis Delgado

30 March 2022	Alianza Petrolera	1–1	Jaguares	Barrancabermeja
18:00 UTC−5	Gil 55'	Report	Quintero 34'	Stadium: Daniel Villa Zapata; Referee: Steven Camargo

31 March 2022	Once Caldas	0–0	Deportes Quindío	Manizales
18:00 UTC−5		Report		Stadium: Palogrande; Referee: Jonathan Ortiz

31 March 2022	Deportivo Pasto	0–1	Santa Fe	Pasto
20:00 UTC−5		Report	Coniglio 62' (pen.)	Stadium: Departamental Libertad; Referee: Jorge Duarte

6 April 2022	Águilas Doradas	0–1	Deportivo Pereira	Rionegro
20:00 UTC−5		Report	Castro 60'	Stadium: Alberto Grisales; Referee: Héctor Rivera

=== Second leg ===
6 April 2022	Real Santander	1–5 (2–8 agg.)	Unión Magdalena	Piedecuesta
14:00 UTC−5	Molina 63'	Report	Camargo 6', 31'; Vacca 27'; Contreras 45'; Gómez 86' (pen.)	Stadium: Villa Concha; Referee: Diego Ulloa

6 April 2022	Tigres	1–0 (1–0 agg.)	Patriotas	Bogotá
15:00 UTC−5	Zúñiga 8'	Report		Stadium: Metropolitano de Techo; Referee: Liz Mair Suárez

6 April 2022	Jaguares	2–1 (3–2 agg.)	Alianza Petrolera	Montería
17:30 UTC−5	Quintero 45' (pen.), 75'	Report	Arango 14'	Stadium: Jaraguay; Referee: Diego Escalante

7 April 2022	Fortaleza	1–0 (2–0 agg.)	Cortuluá	Bogotá
15:00 UTC−5	Solís 75'	Report		Stadium: Metropolitano de Techo; Referee: Jonathan Ortiz

7 April 2022	Deportes Quindío	0–1 (0–1 agg.)	Once Caldas	Armenia
17:30 UTC−5		Report	Valdés 67'	Stadium: Centenario; Referee: Jorge Tabares

7 April 2022	Atlético Bucaramanga	3–0 (3–0 agg.)	Envigado	Bucaramanga
19:30 UTC−5	Y. Moreno 15', 28'; Marcelín 44'	Report		Stadium: Alfonso López; Referee: Nolberto Ararat

7 April 2022	Santa Fe	3–0 (4–0 agg.)	Deportivo Pasto	Bogotá
20:00 UTC−5	Moreno 12'; González 65'; Gutiérrez 89'	Report		Stadium: El Campín; Referee: Luis Matorel

14 April 2022	Deportivo Pereira	1–2 (2–2 agg.) (4–3 p)	Águilas Doradas	Pereira
19:30 UTC−5	Suárez 29'	Report	Vásquez 70'; Artunduaga 80'	Stadium: Hernán Ramírez Villegas; Referee: Diego Ruiz
	Penalties
	Correa (penalty scored); Suárez (penalty missed); Sinisterra (penalty scored); Piedrahita (penalty scored); Mosquera (penalty scored)		(penalty scored) Salazar; (penalty scored) Rodríguez; (penalty missed) Díaz; (penalty scored) Quiñónes; (penalty missed) Vásquez

== Final stages ==
Every round in the knockout stage was played in a home-and-away two-legged format. In each tie, the team which had the better overall record up to that stage hosted the second leg, except in the round of 16 where the third stage winners hosted the second leg. The teams entering the competition at this stage were the ones that qualified for the 2022 Copa Libertadores and 2022 Copa Sudamericana, which were drawn into each of the eight ties. In case of a tie, extra time was not played and the winner was decided in a penalty shoot-out.

=== Bracket ===
Round of 16
Junior	2	1	3
Santa Fe	1	0	1
Atlético Nacional	3	2	5
Once Caldas	0	1	1
La Equidad	2	0	2
Atlético Bucaramanga	0	0	0
América de Cali	1	1	2
Unión Magdalena	2	2	4
Deportes Tolima	3	1	4
Deportivo Pereira	2	1	3
Independiente Medellín	1	2	3
Tigres	0	1	1
Millonarios	3	1	4
Jaguares	0	1	1
Deportivo Cali	1	1	2
Fortaleza	3	1	4

Quarter-finals
Junior	3	1	4
Atlético Nacional	0	1	1
La Equidad	1	1	2 (4)
Unión Magdalena (p)	1	1	2 (5)
Deportes Tolima	1	1	2
Independiente Medellín	3	0	3
Millonarios	3	3	6
Fortaleza	0	2	2

Semi-finals
Junior (p)	0	1	1 (5)
Unión Magdalena	1	0	1 (3)
Independiente Medellín	0	2	2
Millonarios	2	2	4

Finals
Junior	1	0	1
Millonarios	0	2	2

=== Round of 16 ===
The teams qualifying from the third stage played the second leg at home.

Team 1	Agg.	Team 2	1st leg	2nd leg
América de Cali (1)	2–4	Unión Magdalena (1)	1–2	1–2
Deportivo Cali (1)	2–4	Fortaleza (2)	1–3	1–1
Independiente Medellín (1)	3–1	Tigres (2)	1–0	2–1
Atlético Nacional (1)	5–1	Once Caldas (1)	3–0	2–1
Junior (1)	3–1	Santa Fe (1)	2–1	1–0
Deportes Tolima (1)	4–3	Deportivo Pereira (1)	3–2	1–1
Millonarios (1)	4–1	Jaguares (1)	3–0	1–1
La Equidad (1)	2–0	Atlético Bucaramanga (1)	2–0	0–0

==== First leg ====
20 April 2022	Independiente Medellín	1–0	Tigres	Medellín
15:00 UTC−5	Cambindo 16'	Report		Stadium: Atanasio Girardot; Referee: Yahir Cárdenas

20 April 2022	América de Cali	1–2	Unión Magdalena	Cali
15:30 UTC−5	Ramos 49'	Report	Vacca 15'; Vega 62'	Stadium: Pascual Guerrero; Referee: David Espinosa

20 April 2022	La Equidad	2–0	Atlético Bucaramanga	Bogotá
16:00 UTC−5	Torralvo 27'; Rivas 31'	Report		Stadium: Metropolitano de Techo; Referee: Diego Ulloa

20 April 2022	Junior	2–1	Santa Fe	Barranquilla
18:00 UTC−5	Borja 7'; Uribe 88'	Report	Coniglio 45+3' (pen.)	Stadium: Metropolitano Roberto Meléndez; Referee: Héctor Rivera

20 April 2022	Deportes Tolima	3–2	Deportivo Pereira	Ibagué
19:30 UTC−5	Ramírez 20'; Lucumí 38'; Plata 71'	Report	León 34' (pen.); Palacio 44'	Stadium: Manuel Murillo Toro; Referee: Luis Matorel

20 April 2022	Atlético Nacional	3–0	Once Caldas	Medellín
20:15 UTC−5	Mantilla 5'; Banguero 11'; Moreno 46'	Report		Stadium: Atanasio Girardot; Referee: Steven Camargo

20 April 2022	Deportivo Cali	1–3	Fortaleza	Palmira
20:15 UTC−5	Rodríguez 32'	Report	Aladesanmi 43'; Alvarado 54'; Parra 73'	Stadium: Deportivo Cali; Referee: Liz Mair Suárez

21 April 2022	Millonarios	3–0	Jaguares	Bogotá
20:00 UTC−5	Llinás 13'; Ruiz 45+1'; Herazo 63'	Report		Stadium: El Campín; Referee: Jonathan Ortiz

==== Second leg ====
11 May 2022	Tigres	1–2 (1–3 agg.)	Independiente Medellín	Bogotá
14:00 UTC−5	Á. Méndez 32'	Report	Camargo 49'; Castrillón 75'	Stadium: Metropolitano de Techo; Referee: Diego Ulloa

11 May 2022	Unión Magdalena	2–1 (4–2 agg.)	América de Cali	Santa Marta
15:30 UTC−5	Peña 24'; Camargo 42'	Report	Hernández 1'	Stadium: Sierra Nevada; Referee: Néver Manjarrés
Note: Match suspended after 79 minutes of play due to a failure in the stadium's lighting system and heavy rain. It was resumed on 12 May 2022 at 9:00 local time.

11 May 2022	Atlético Bucaramanga	0–0 (0–2 agg.)	La Equidad	Bucaramanga
17:00 UTC−5		Report		Stadium: Alfonso López; Referee: José Ortiz

11 May 2022	Once Caldas	1–2 (1–5 agg.)	Atlético Nacional	Manizales
18:00 UTC−5	Del Valle 48'	Report	Mantilla 34'; Angulo 72'	Stadium: Palogrande; Referee: Lisandro Castillo

11 May 2022	Jaguares	1–1 (1–4 agg.)	Millonarios	Montería
18:00 UTC−5	Arroyo 17'	Report	Cortés 45'	Stadium: Jaraguay; Referee: Yahir Cárdenas

11 May 2022	Deportivo Pereira	1–1 (3–4 agg.)	Deportes Tolima	Pereira
19:00 UTC−5	Ramírez 90+1'	Report	Meléndez 39'	Stadium: Hernán Ramírez Villegas; Referee: Jorge Tabares

11 May 2022	Santa Fe	0–1 (1–3 agg.)	Junior	Bogotá
20:10 UTC−5		Report	Rosero 84'	Stadium: El Campín; Referee: Edilson Ariza

12 May 2022	Fortaleza	1–1 (4–2 agg.)	Deportivo Cali	Bogotá
20:00 UTC−5	Parra 66'	Report	Rodríguez 10'	Stadium: Metropolitano de Techo; Referee: Mauricio Mercado

=== Quarter-finals ===
Team 1	Agg.	Team 2	1st leg	2nd leg
La Equidad (1)	2–2 (4–5 p)	Unión Magdalena (1)	1–1	1–1
Millonarios (1)	6–2	Fortaleza (2)	3–0	3–2
Deportes Tolima (1)	2–3	Independiente Medellín (1)	1–3	1–0
Junior (1)	4–1	Atlético Nacional (1)	3–0	1–1

==== First leg ====
27 July 2022	Millonarios	3–0	Fortaleza	Bogotá
18:00 UTC−5	Herazo 14', 17'; Gómez 47'	Report		Stadium: El Campín; Referee: Jorge Tabares

27 July 2022	Deportes Tolima	1–3	Independiente Medellín	Ibagué
20:05 UTC−5	Rangel 14'	Report	Cambindo 4'; Moreno 29'; Monsalve 39'	Stadium: Manuel Murillo Toro; Referee: Luis Matorel

28 July 2022	La Equidad	1–1	Unión Magdalena	Bogotá
18:00 UTC−5	Vega 24' (o.g.)	Report	Lloreda 62'	Stadium: Metropolitano de Techo; Referee: Bismarks Santiago

28 July 2022	Junior	3–0	Atlético Nacional	Barranquilla
20:05 UTC−5	Valencia 34'; Cetré 59' (pen.); Castrillón 86'	Report		Stadium: Metropolitano Roberto Meléndez; Referee: Diego Ruiz

==== Second leg ====
17 August 2022	Independiente Medellín	0–1 (3–2 agg.)	Deportes Tolima	Medellín
18:00 UTC−5		Report	F. Mosquera 86'	Stadium: Atanasio Girardot; Referee: Bismarks Santiago

17 August 2022	Fortaleza	2–3 (2–6 agg.)	Millonarios	Bogotá
20:15 UTC−5	Solís 25'; Navarro 35'	Report	Rosales 11'; Gómez 28'; Cataño 77'	Stadium: El Campín; Referee: Nicolás Gallo

18 August 2022	Unión Magdalena	1–1 (2–2 agg.) (5–4 p)	La Equidad	Santa Marta
17:30 UTC−5	Márquez 45+7'	Report	Chaverra 46'	Stadium: Sierra Nevada; Referee: Wilmar Roldán
	Penalties
	Márquez (penalty scored); Vega (penalty scored); Vacca (penalty scored); Lopera (penalty scored); Hinojosa (penalty scored)		(penalty scored) Castro; (penalty scored) Mahecha; (penalty scored) Chaverra; (penalty missed) Caicedo; (penalty scored) Riascos

18 August 2022	Atlético Nacional	1–1 (1–4 agg.)	Junior	Medellín
20:00 UTC−5	Je. Duque 89' (pen.)	Report	Castrillón 61'	Stadium: Atanasio Girardot; Referee: John Hinestroza

=== Semi-finals ===
Team 1	Agg.	Team 2	1st leg	2nd leg
Junior (1)	1–1 (5–3 p)	Unión Magdalena (1)	0–1	1–0
Independiente Medellín (1)	2–4	Millonarios (1)	0–2	2–2

==== First leg ====
24 August 2022	Junior	0–1	Unión Magdalena	Barranquilla
18:00 UTC−5		Report	Cantillo 27'	Stadium: Metropolitano Roberto Meléndez; Referee: Edilson Ariza

24 August 2022	Independiente Medellín	0–2	Millonarios	Medellín
20:05 UTC−5		Report	L. Ruiz 17'; Gómez 45+3'	Stadium: Atanasio Girardot; Referee: Éder Vergara

==== Second leg ====
7 September 2022	Millonarios	2–2 (4–2 agg.)	Independiente Medellín	Bogotá
20:00 UTC−5	Silva 60'; D. Ruiz 85'	Report	Cambindo 29'; Pons 37'	Stadium: El Campín; Referee: Carlos Ortega

14 September 2022	Unión Magdalena	0–1 (1–1 agg.) (3–5 p)	Junior	Santa Marta
18:00 UTC−5		Report	Sambueza 70'	Stadium: Sierra Nevada; Referee: Wilmar Roldán
	Penalties
	Márquez (penalty scored); Sánchez (penalty scored); Vacca (penalty missed); Lopera (penalty scored)		(penalty scored) Cetré; (penalty scored) Albornoz; (penalty scored) Arias; (penalty scored) Valencia; (penalty scored) Bacca

=== Finals ===
28 September 2022
20:00 UTC−5

Junior (1)	1–0	Millonarios (1)
Haydar 62'	Report

Estadio Metropolitano Roberto Meléndez, Barranquilla
Referee: Carlos Ortega

2 November 2022
20:00 UTC−5

Millonarios (1)	2–0	Junior (1)
L. Ruiz 18' (pen.); Silva 78'	Report

Estadio El Campín, Bogotá
Referee: Wilmar Roldán

Millonarios won 2–1 on aggregate.

== See also ==
- 2022 Categoría Primera A season
- 2022 Categoría Primera B season
