= Alexis Márquez (footballer) =

Colombian footballer and manager (born 1981)

Personal information
- Full name: José Alexis Márquez Restrepo
- Date of birth: 27 June 1976 (age 50)
- Place of birth: Pereira, Colombia
- Height: 1.83 m (6 ft 0 in)
- Position: Goalkeeper

Team information
- Current team: Deportivo Pereira (manager)

Youth career
- Ferro Club

Senior career*
| Years | Team | Apps | (Gls) |
| 1994–1999 | Ferro Club | | |
| 1999–2006 | Deportivo Pereira | 182 | (0) |
| 2007 | Real Cartagena | 21 | (0) |
| 2008–2012 | Deportivo Pereira | 86 | (0) |
| 2012 | Deportivo Pasto | 3 | (0) |
| 2014–2015 | Deportivo Pereira | 22 | (0) |

Managerial career
- 2020: Deportivo Pereira (interim)
- 2021: Deportivo Pereira (interim)
- 2021–2022: Deportivo Pereira
- 2022: Jaguares de Córdoba
- 2023: Atlético Bucaramanga
- 2024: Envigado
- 2026: Jaguares de Córdoba
- 2026: Nacional Potosí
- 2026–: Deportivo Pereira
- * Club domestic league appearances and goals

José Alexis Márquez Restrepo (born 30 June 1981) is a Colombian football manager and former footballer who played as a goalkeeper. He is the current manager of Colombian club Deportivo Pereira.

== Playing career ==
Born in Pereira, Márquez started his career with Ferro Club before making his professional debut with Deportivo Pereira in 1999. He left the club in 2007 for Real Cartagena, but returned to Pereira in the following year.

In 2012, after a short period at Deportivo Pasto, Márquez retired and became Deportivo Pereira's goalkeeping coach. In 2014, however, he returned to action with Pereira, definitely retiring in 2015. He ended his career with 292 matches in his 14-year spell for Pereira, being the second-highest appearance holder in the club, only behind Luis Pompilio Páez.

== Managerial career ==
After retiring, Márquez was again named goalkeeping coach for Deportivo Pereira. In November 2020, he was named interim manager after the departure of Néstor Craviotto.

On 26 February 2021, after Jorge Artigas left on a mutual agreement, Márquez was again appointed interim of Pereira. On 22 April, he was permanently appointed manager.

On 14 May 2022, Márquez resigned from Pereira, and was appointed manager of Jaguares de Córdoba in the place of Grigori Méndez on 13 September. After failing to advance to the semifinal stage of the 2022 Finalización tournament, and citing personal matters, he resigned from Jaguares on 1 November.

On 3 April 2023, Márquez was appointed manager of Atlético Bucaramanga. He resigned from the position on 25 September, after going on a 6-match winless run. On 1 April 2024, Márquez was appointed manager of Envigado, leaving the club on a mutual agreement five months later.

On 26 November 2025, Márquez returned to Jaguares for a second stint as manager, replacing Álvaro Hernández who resigned from the club after promoting it back to the top tier. However, he left the club on 14 February 2026 after a 5–0 loss to Boyacá Chicó.

On 13 March 2026, Márquez moved abroad for the first time in his career, after being appointed manager of Bolivian club Nacional Potosí. On 16 July, he was sacked.

On 6 October 2026, Márquez returned to Deportivo Pereira.
