= Leonardo Castro =

Leonardo Castro may refer to:

- Leonardo Castro (footballer, born 1989), Colombian football forward for Kaizer Chiefs
- Leonardo Castro (footballer, born 1992), Colombian football forward for Independiente Medellín
