= Luis Páez =

Luis Páez may refer to:

- Luis Pompilio Páez (born 1959), Colombian football defensive midfielder
- Luis Páez (footballer, born 1986), Colombian football forward
- Luis Páez (footballer, 1989-2019), Paraguayan football forward
