= David Silva (footballer, born December 1986) =

Colombian footballer

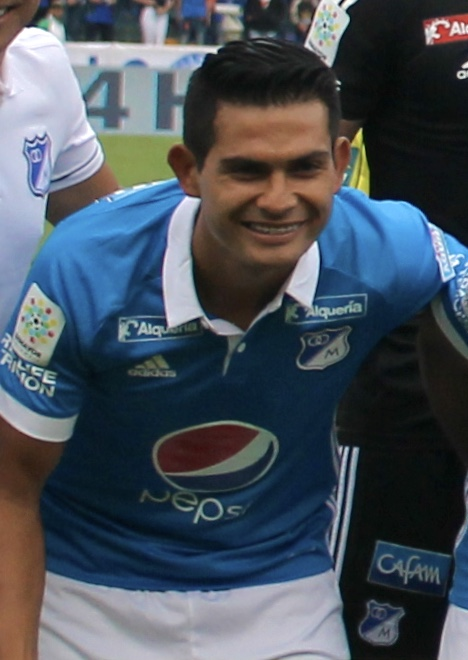
- David Silva with Millonarios in 2017

Personal information
- Full name: David Mackalister Silva Mosquera
- Date of birth: December 13, 1986 (age 39)
- Place of birth: Bogotá, Colombia
- Height: 1.75 m (5 ft 9 in)
- Position: Midfielder

Team information
- Current team: Millonarios
- Number: 14

Senior career*
Years	Team	Apps	(Gls)
2006–2008	Millonarios	1	(0)
2007	→ Deportivo Pereira (loan)	3	(0)
2009–2010	Bogotá	61	(8)
2011	Real Cartagena	29	(5)
2012–2014	Deportes Tolima	87	(8)
2015–	Millonarios	374	(53)

International career^{‡}
2023–	Colombia	2	(0)
- * Club domestic league appearances and goals as of 12 December 2025 ‡ National team caps and goals as of 16 December 2023

David Mackalister Silva Mosquera (born 13 December 1986), also known as Macka, is a Colombian professional footballer who plays as a midfielder for and captains Categoría Primera A club Millonarios.

== Career ==
David Silva started his career in the lower divisions of Millonarios, where he played as a striker. His main features are link up play and technique on the right foot. After two years in Millonarios, Silva was sent on a loan to Deportivo Pereira, a team for which he only had a few appearances. For the 2008 season, Silva returned to Millonarios.

After passing through Bogotá and Real Cartagena, David Silva signed with Deportes Tolima. Here he was a key player in the starting eleven and he even captained the team before returning to Millonarios once again in 2015. Now with a lot more experience to his name, Silva walked seamlessly into the Millonarios starting eleven that won the team's fifteenth league title in December 2017. As of 2019 he is the teams' second captain.

== Career statistics ==
=== International ===
As of match played 16 December 2023

Appearances and goals by national team and year
National team	Year	Apps	Goals
Colombia	2023	2	0
Total		2	0

== Honours ==
Deportes Tolima

- Copa Colombia (1): 2014

Millonarios

- Categoría Primera A (2): 2017-II, 2023-I
- Copa Colombia (1): 2022
- Superliga Colombiana (2): 2018, 2024

Sporting positions
Preceded by Jhon Duque	Millonarios captain 2021–	Succeeded by Incumbent
