= Fernando Velasco =

Fernando Velasco may refer to:

- Fernando Velasco (American football) (born 1985), American football center
- Fernando Velasco (politician), Spanish politician, former Secretary General of Young Patriots (Basque Country)
- Fernando Velasco Gutiérrez (born 1964), Colombian football manager
- Fernando Velasco Salazar (born 1985), Spanish football (soccer) player known as Fernando Velasco
