= Viáfara =

Viáfara is a surname. Notable people with the surname include:

- Henry Viáfara (born 1953), Colombian footballer
- Jhon Viáfara (born 1978), Colombian footballer
- Julián Viáfara (born 1978), Colombian footballer
- Ramiro Viáfara (born 1947), Colombian footballer
