= Jhonny Vásquez =

Colombian footballer (born 1987)

Personal information
- Full name: Jhonny Alexander Vásquez Salazar
- Date of birth: July 23, 1987 (age 39)
- Place of birth: Santander de Quilichao, Colombia
- Height: 1.77 m (5 ft 10 in)
- Positions: Midfielder; right-back

Team information
- Current team: Deportivo Pereira
- Number: 25

Youth career
- Deportivo Cali

Senior career*
Years	Team	Apps	(Gls)
2007–2009	Deportivo Cali	39	(1)
2009	Monagas	7	(2)
2010	Deportivo Pasto	20	(1)
2011–2013	Itagüí Ditaires	95	(3)
2013–2016	Junior	73	(3)
2016–2017	América de Cali	49	(2)
2018	Rionegro Águilas	28	(1)
2019–2024	Deportivo Pereira	143	(7)
- * Club domestic league appearances and goals

Jhonny Vásquez (born 23 July 1987) is a former Colombian footballer. He played as a defensive midfielder.

== Personal life ==
In 2015 while he was playing for Junior de Barranquilla, he was diagnosed with CML (Chronic Myeloid Leukemia); fortunately he managed to overcome that disease, although Vásquez has revealed that he had problems getting medicines during the COVID 19 pandemic.

== Honours ==
Junior de Barranquilla

- Copa Colombia (1): 2015

América de Cali

- Categoría Primera B (1): 2016

Deportivo Pereira

- Categoría Primera B (1): 2019
- Categoría Primera A (1): 2022-II.

Sporting positions
Preceded by 'Unknown'	Deportivo Pereira captain 2019–2023	Succeeded by Carlos Ramírez

Sporting positions
Preceded by Carlos Ramírez	Deportivo Pereira captain 2024	Succeeded by Incumbent
