= Sergio Angulo =

Colombian footballer and manager (born 1960)

Personal information
- Full name: Sergio Angulo Bolaños
- Date of birth: 14 September 1960 (age 66)
- Place of birth: Ibagué, Colombia
- Height: 1.83 m (6 ft 0 in)
- Position: Striker

Team information
- Current team: Deportivo Cali (women) (youth)

Youth career
- Deportivo Cali

Senior career*
| Years | Team | Apps | (Gls) |
| 1978–1982 | Deportivo Cali | | |
| 1982 | Cúcuta Deportivo | | |
| 1983–1986 | Deportivo Cali | | |
| 1987–1988 | Santa Fe | | |
| 1989–1992 | América de Cali | | |
| 1993 | Deportivo Pereira | | |
| 1994 | Cúcuta Deportivo | | |
| 1995 | Independiente Popayán | | |
| 1996 | Deportivo Pasto | | |
| 1997 | Deportivo Unicosta | | |
| 1998 | Univalle | | |

International career
| 1985–1991 | Colombia | 13 | (1) |

Managerial career
- 2000–2001: Millonarios (assistant)
- 2001: Expreso Palmira
- 2002–2004: Deportivo Cali (youth)
- 2003: Deportivo Cali (interim)
- 2005–2006: Deportivo Cali (youth)
- 2011: Cortuluá
- 2012: Tauro
- 2014–2017: Deportivo Cali (youth)
- 2017: Deportivo Cali (interim)
- 2018: Tauro
- 2018: San Francisco
- 2019–2021: Deportivo Cali (youth)
- 2021: Árabe Unido
- 2022: Deportivo Cali (youth)
- 2022: Deportivo Cali (interim)
- 2023: Deportivo Cali (women)
- 2024–: Deportivo Cali (youth)
- * Club domestic league appearances and goals

Sergio "Checho" Angulo (born 14 September 1960) is a Colombian football manager and former player, who played as a striker for the Colombia national football team and for Deportivo Cali. He has also played for Cúcuta Deportivo, Independiente Santa Fe, América de Cali, Deportivo Pereira, Deportivo Independiente Popayán, Deportivo Pasto, and Deportivo Unicosta. He is currently the manager of Deportivo Cali's youth teams.

== Club career ==
His football debut was on 19 April 1979. He retired in 1998.

== International career ==
With the Colombia national football team, he participated in the 1979 South American U-20 Championship. Angulo did not score any goals in his nine appearances for the Colombian national team between 1987 and 1991. He participated in the 1987 and 1989 Copa Américas for Colombia. He was the top scorer of the Categoría Primera A in 1988 with 29 goals.

== Personal life ==
His son is the soccer player Mario Sergio Angulo.

== Coaching ==
He has coached mainly youth teams of Millonarios and Deportivo Cali, where he served as assistant coach of Iván Arroyo, Diego Umaña, Óscar Quintabani and Pedro Sarmiento. On 19 October 2017, he was appointed as caretaker manager of Deportivo Cali.

In 2023, Angulo managed Deportivo Cali's women's team.
