= César Torres =

Colombian football manager

Personal information
- Full name: César Fernando Torres Ramírez
- Date of birth: 23 September 1976 (age 50)
- Place of birth: Cali, Colombia

Team information
- Current team: Colombia U20 (manager)

Managerial career
- Years: Team
- Boca Juniors de Cali (youth)
- 2006: Cortuluá (assistant)
- 2007: Centauros Villavicencio (assistant)
- 2007–2008: Centauros Villavicencio
- 2009–2011: Centauros Villavicencio (assistant)
- 2012: Universitario Popayán
- 2013: Deportes Quindío (assistant)
- 2013: Deportes Quindío (interim)
- 2014–2018: Universitario Popayán
- 2018–2020: Alianza Petrolera
- 2021–2022: Jaguares de Córdoba
- 2022: Cortuluá
- 2023: Bogotá
- 2023: Alianza Petrolera
- 2024: Alianza
- 2024–: Colombia U20
Medal record
Men's football
Representing Colombia (as manager)
FIFA U-20 World Cup
| Third place | 2025 Chile |

César Fernando Torres Ramírez (born 23 September 1976) is a Colombian professional football manager, currently in charge of the Colombia national under-20 team.

== Career ==
Torres was born in Cali, and started his career in the youth categories of hometown side Boca Juniors de Cali. After spending several years in the club, he moved to Cortuluá in 2006 after being named Alberto Suárez's assistant.

In 2007, Torres was appointed Nelson Abadía's assistant at Centauros Villavicencio, and was later the club's manager for the latter stages of the campaign. He moved back to his assistant role for the 2009 season, after the appointment of Eduardo Cruz as manager.

In 2012, after the establishment of Universitario Popayán, Torres was named their new manager. He left in the following year to work as Cruz's assistant at Deportes Quindío, being also an interim manager of the club after Cruz left.

In January 2014, Torres returned to Universitario, being in charge of the club in the Categoría Primera B. In October 2018, he was named at the helm of Alianza Petrolera, seriously threatened with relegation in the Categoría Primera A.

After avoiding relegation, Torres led Alianza to the semifinals of the 2019 Torneo Finalización, but was sacked on 16 November 2020 after a 1–6 loss to Millonarios. On 25 May 2021, he was appointed manager of Jaguares de Córdoba.

On 4 May 2022, Jaguares announced that Torres would leave on a mutual agreement at the end of the Apertura Tournament. Twenty days later he was announced as the new manager of Cortuluá. On 18 September, he resigned from Cortuluá after going winless for seven games, leaving the club in last place of both the 2022 Finalización tournament and the season's relegation table.

On 6 March 2023, Torres was appointed as manager of Categoría Primera B club Bogotá. Torres left Bogotá on 25 June 2023, as he was signed for a second spell as manager of Alianza Petrolera. With Alianza Petrolera being relocated to Valledupar prior to the start of the 2024 season, Torres became the manager for its successor club Alianza F.C. On 29 March, he left Alianza on a mutual agreement.

On 2 May 2024, Torres was appointed as manager of the Colombia national under-20 team.

== Honours ==
Colombia U20

- FIFA U-20 World Cup third place: 2025
