= Manuel Suárez (Chilean footballer) =

Chilean footballer and manager (born 1972)

Personal information
- Full name: Manuel Antonio Suárez Jiménez
- Date of birth: 28 February 1972 (age 54)
- Place of birth: Santiago, Chile
- Height: 1.85 m (6 ft 1 in)
- Position: Goalkeeper

Youth career
- Unión Española

Senior career*
Years	Team	Apps	(Gls)
1990–1992	Unión Española		
1992	St. Gallen		
1993	Unión Española		
1994	Audax Italiano		
1995–1996	Unión Española		
1997	Unión San Felipe		

International career
1994	Chile U23		

Managerial career
- 2003–2010: Universidad Católica (goalkeeping coach)
- 2010–2011: Universidad Católica (assistant)
- 2011–2012: Rosario Central (assistant)
- 2012–2013: San Lorenzo (assistant)
- 2014: Valencia (assistant)
- 2015–2016: León (assistant)
- 2016–2017: Chile (assistant)
- 2018: Saudi Arabia (assistant)
- 2022: Cortuluá
- 2024: Al-Qadsiah U19
- 2024–2025: Deportes Concepción
- 2026: Chile (assistant)
- * Club domestic league appearances and goals

Manuel Antonio Suárez Jiménez (born 28 February 1972) is a Chilean football manager and former player who played as a goalkeeper.

== Playing career ==
Born in Santiago, Suárez started his career with Unión Española in 1990. He also played for Audax Italiano and Unión San Felipe in his home country, aside from a short spell at Swiss side FC St. Gallen before retiring in 1997. In an international level, he played for the Chile under-23 national team in 1994.

== Managerial career ==
After retiring, Suárez started working as a goalkeeping coach until joining Universidad Católica in 2003. In 2010, after Juan Antonio Pizzi was named manager of the club's first team, Suárez was named as his assistant.

Suárez followed Pizzi to Rosario Central, San Lorenzo, Valencia, León and the Chile and Saudi Arabia national teams, always as his assistant. He left the latter in September 2018, and returned to his home country to work at Deportes La Serena as a sports consultant.

On 3 January 2022, Suárez was announced as manager of Categoría Primera A side Cortuluá for the 2022 season. On 2 May, he was sacked.

In June 2024, he assumed as manager of Deportes Concepción in the Segunda División Profesional de Chile after coaching the Al-Qadsiah under-19 team. He was released in August 2025.

In March 2026, Suárez was included as an assistant coach for the Chile national team in the context of the 2026 FIFA Series matches against Cape Verde and New Zealand in Auckland.
