= Esteban Beltrán =

Colombian footballer (born 1999)

Personal information
- Full name: Johan Esteban Beltrán Montano
- Date of birth: 18 October 1999 (age 27)
- Height: 1.76 m (5 ft 9 in)
- Position: Midfielder

Team information
- Current team: Once Caldas
- Number: 8

Youth career
- –2019: Once Caldas

Senior career*
Years	Team	Apps	(Gls)
2019–	Once Caldas	71	(2)
2019–2020	→ Vysočina Jihlava (loan)	1	(0)
- * Club domestic league appearances and goals as of 12 December 2025

Johan Esteban Beltrán Montano (born 18 October 1999) is a Colombian footballer playing as a midfielder for Once Caldas.

== Career statistics ==
=== Club ===
As of 25 January 2022.

Club	Season	League			Cup		Other		Total	
Club	Season	Division	Apps	Goals	Apps	Goals	Apps	Goals	Apps	Goals
Atlético Nacional	2019	Categoría Primera A	0	0	0	0	0	0	0	0
Atlético Nacional	2020	Categoría Primera A	0	0	0	0	0	0	0	0
Atlético Nacional	2021	Categoría Primera A	1	0	0	0	0	0	1	0
Atlético Nacional	2022	Categoría Primera A	0	0	0	0	0	0	0	0
Atlético Nacional	Total		1	0	0	0	0	0	1	0
Vysočina Jihlava (loan)	2019–20	Fortuna národní liga	1	0	0	0	0	0	1	0
Career total			2	0	0	0	0	0	2	0
