= Alejandro Restrepo =

Colombian football manager

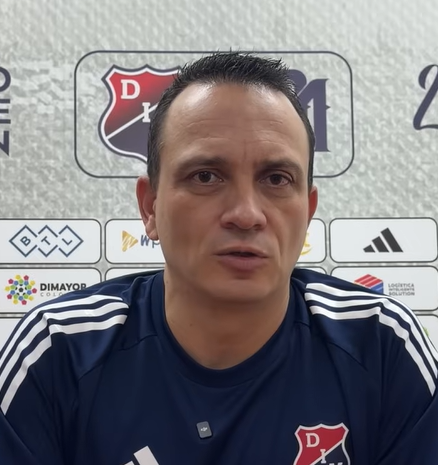
- Restrepo in 2025

Personal information
- Full name: Alejandro Restrepo Mazo
- Date of birth: 30 January 1982 (age 44)
- Place of birth: Medellín, Colombia

Team information
- Current team: Bolívar (manager)

Youth career
- Years: Team
- 1998–2001: Estudiantil

Managerial career
- 2004–2012: Estudiantil (youth)
- 2014–2015: Colombia U17 (assistant)
- 2016–2018: Estudiantil (youth)
- 2019–2021: Atlético Nacional (youth)
- 2019: Atlético Nacional (interim)
- 2020: Atlético Nacional (interim)
- 2021–2022: Atlético Nacional
- 2022–2023: Deportivo Pereira
- 2024: Alianza Lima
- 2024–2026: Independiente Medellín
- 2026–: Bolívar

Alejandro Restrepo Mazo (born 30 January 1982) is a Colombian football manager, currently in charge of Bolivian club Bolívar.

== Career ==
Born in Medellín, Restrepo played as a youth for Estudiantil before becoming the manager of their youth categories in 2004. He left the club in 2012 to take over the under-20 side of the Liga Antioqueña de Fútbol.

Restrepo returned to Estudiantil in 2016, after a period as an assistant manager in the Colombia under-17 national team. On 31 January 2019, he was named manager of Atlético Nacional's under-20 squad.

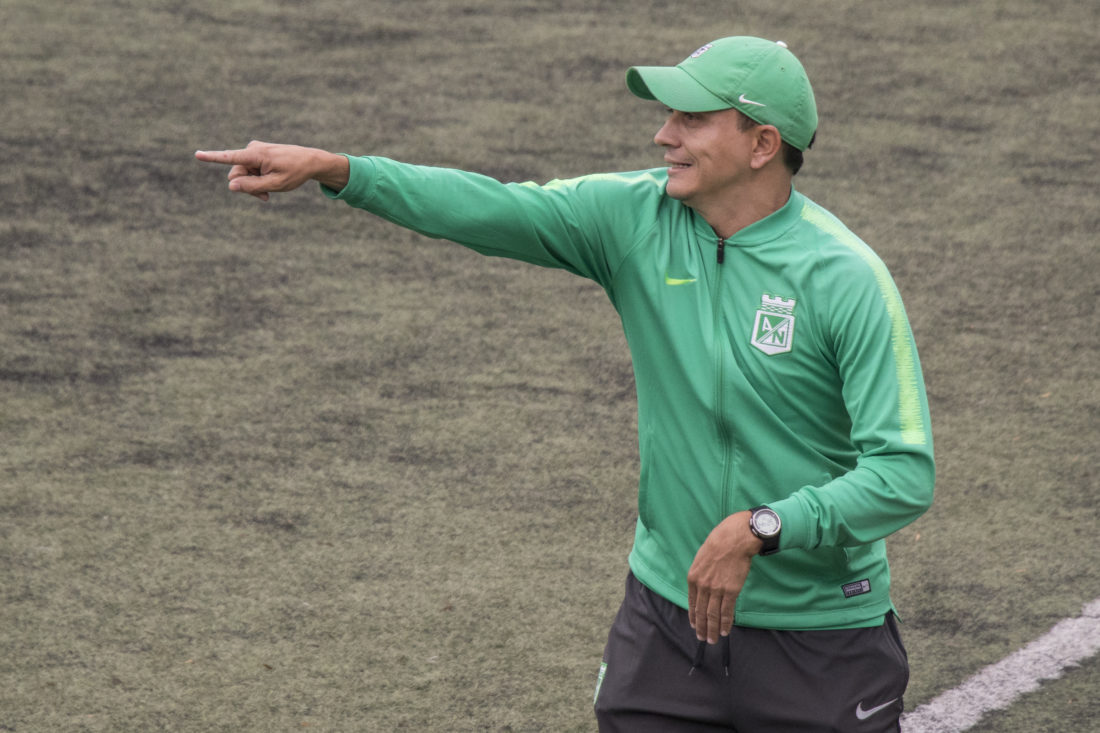
Restrepo in a training of Atlético Nacional in 2019

On 24 May 2019, Restrepo was named interim manager of the main squad, after Paulo Autuori resigned. He returned to his previous role after the appointment of Juan Carlos Osorio, but was again interim in November 2020 after the latter was sacked.

After the appointment of Alexandre Guimarães as manager, Restrepo returned to his previous role, but was presented as first team manager on 9 June 2021 after Guimarães left. He left on a mutual agreement on 28 February 2022, and took over fellow top-tier side Deportivo Pereira on 20 May.

On 11 November 2023, after winning the 2022 Finalización title with Pereira, Restrepo announced his departure from the club. He moved abroad for the first time in his career thirteen days later, being presented at Peruvian Liga 1 side Alianza Lima, from where he was sacked on 27 July 2024.

On 7 August 2024, Restrepo was appointed as manager of Independiente Medellín. He was sacked on 21 April 2026, after a 20-month tenure in which Medellín broke a record for points in a single season, accumulating 92 points in the 2025 season's aggregate table which allowed them to qualify for the Copa Libertadores after a three-year absence, and reached the final series of both the domestic league and cup, ending as runner-up in both of them.

On 21 May 2026, Restrepo moved abroad and took over Bolívar in Bolivia.

== Honours ==
Atlético Nacional

- Copa Colombia: 2021

Deportivo Pereira

- Categoría Primera A: 2022 Finalización
