= Carlos Ramírez (Colombian footballer) =

Colombian footballer (born 1988)

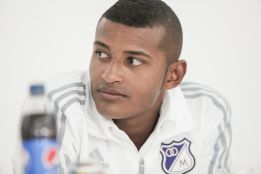
- Carlos Ramírez in 2015.

Personal information
- Full name: Carlos Andrés Ramírez Aguirre
- Date of birth: May 1, 1988 (age 38)
- Place of birth: Pereira, Risaralda, Colombia
- Height: 1.83 m (6 ft 0 in)
- Position: Defender

Team information
- Current team: Envigado
- Number: 29

Senior career*
Years	Team	Apps	(Gls)
2006–2008	Deportivo Pereira	24	(0)
2009	Millonarios	0	(0)
2010–2011	Once Caldas	13	(0)
2012–2013	Deportivo Pereira	49	(5)
2014	Envigado	31	(0)
2015	Millonarios	11	(1)
2016	América de Cali	13	(0)
2016–2017	Alianza Petrolera	30	(0)
2017–2018	Atlético Huila	34	(1)
2018–2020	Rionegro Águilas	83	(3)
2021–2024	Deportivo Pereira	92	(23)
- * Club domestic league appearances and goals as of 26 October 2023

Carlos Andrés Ramirez Aguirre (born May 1, 1988) is a Colombian football defender. He currently plays for Envigado; he also served as the club's captain since 2023 until 2024.

== Career statistics ==
=== Club ===
As of 12 February 2024

Club	Division	Season	League		Cup		Continental		Total	
Club	Division	Season	Apps	Goals	Apps	Goals	Apps	Goals	Apps	Goals
Deportivo Pereira	Categoría Primera A	2006-2008	24	0	?	?	-	-	24	0
Deportivo Pereira	Categoría Primera B	2012	25	1	4	0	-	-	29	1
Deportivo Pereira	Categoría Primera B	2013	24	4	6	0	-	-	30	4
Deportivo Pereira	Categoría Primera A	2021	21	3	9	1	-	-	30	4
Deportivo Pereira	Categoría Primera A	2022	42	12	1	1	-	-	43	13
Deportivo Pereira	Categoría Primera A	2023	29	8	6	1	9	1	44	10
Deportivo Pereira	Total		165	28	26	3	9	1	191	31
Millonarios	Categoría Primera A	2009	0	0	2	0	-	-	2	0
Millonarios	Categoría Primera A	2015	6	0	5	0	-	-	11	0
Millonarios	Total		6	0	7	0	0	0	13	0
Once Caldas	Categoría Primera A	2010	10	0	0	0	-	-	10	0
Once Caldas	Categoría Primera A	2011	3	0	2	0	3	0	8	0
Once Caldas	Total		13	0	2	0	3	0	18	0
Envigado	Categoría Primera A	2014	31	0	2	0	-	-	33	0
América de Cali	Categoría Primera B	2016	13	0	3	1	-	-	16	1
Alianza Petrolera	Categoría Primera A	2016	12	0	-	-	-	-	12	0
Alianza Petrolera	Categoría Primera A	2017	18	0	3	0	-	-	21	0
Alianza Petrolera	Total		30	0	3	0	0	0	33	0
Atlético Huila	Categoría Primera A	2017	11	1	2	0	-	-	13	1
Atlético Huila	Categoría Primera A	2018	23	0	-	-	-	-	23	0
Atlético Huila	Total		34	1	2	0	0	0	36	1
Rionegro Águilas	Categoría Primera A	2018	23	2	-	-	-	-	23	2
Rionegro Águilas	Categoría Primera A	2019	34	1	2	0	4	0	40	1
Rionegro Águilas	Categoría Primera A	2020	15	0	2	0	-	-	17	0
Rionegro Águilas	Categoría Primera A	2021	11	0	-	-	-	-	11	0
Rionegro Águilas	Total		83	3	4	0	4	0	91	3
Unión Comercio	Liga 1	2024	3	0	-	-	-	-	3	0
Career total			378	32	49	4	16	1	443	37

== Honours ==
Once Caldas

- Categoría Primera A (1): 2010-II

Deportivo Pereira

- Categoría Primera A (1): 2022-II

Sporting positions
Preceded by Jhonny Vásquez	Deportivo Pereira captain 2024	Succeeded by Jhonny Vásquez
