= Arturo Reyes (footballer) =

Colombian footballer and coach (born 1969)

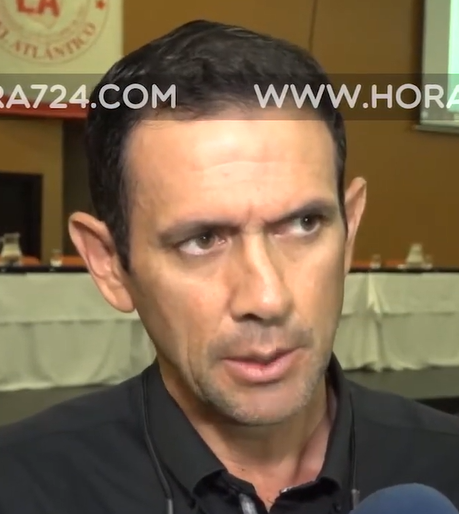
- Reyes in 2018

Personal information
- Full name: Arturo Ernesto Reyes Montero
- Date of birth: 8 April 1969 (age 57)
- Place of birth: Santa Marta, Colombia
- Height: 1.76 m (5 ft 9 in)
- Position: Defender

Senior career*
Years	Team	Apps	(Gls)
1992–1999	Atlético Bucaramanga		
2000–2001	Atlético Huila		
2002–2004	Unión Magdalena		
2005	Academia		
2006	Atlético Bucaramanga		

Managerial career
- 2008: Academia
- 2008: Atlético Bucaramanga
- 2009–2012: Academia (youth)
- 2013: Patriotas
- 2013–2017: Barranquilla
- 2017: Atlético Junior (assistant)
- 2017–2021: Colombia U20
- 2018: Colombia U21
- 2018: Colombia (interim)
- 2019–2021: Colombia Olympic
- 2019–2020: Colombia (assistant)
- 2021: Atlético Junior
- 2022: Barranquilla
- 2022–2023: Atlético Junior
- 2023–2024: Atlético Junior
- 2025: Sport Boys
- 2026: Deportivo Pereira
- * Club domestic league appearances and goals

Arturo Ernesto Reyes Montero (born 8 April 1969) is a Colombian football coach and former footballer who played as a defender.

As a footballer he began and finished his career at Atlético Bucaramanga starting in 1992 and finishing playing in 2005. He also played in Colombian domestic football for Academia F.C., Atlético Huila, and Unión Magdalena. As a football coach he had spells at Barranquilla F.C., Atlético Bucaramanga, Patriotas Boyacá, and Atlético Junior, before being appointed to the Colombia youth set up. In July 2018 he led the Colombian team to the gold medal at the 2018 Central American and Caribbean Games beating Venezuela national under-20 football team 2–1 in the final.

With the departure of José Pékerman following the 2018 FIFA World Cup Reyes was announced as interim manager for the September 2018 friendly matches against Argentina national football team and the Venezuela national football team. He continued as first team coach for the October friendlies against the United States and Costa Rica.
