= Henry Viáfara =

Colombian footballer (born 1953)

Henry Roberto Viáfara Possú (born 20 April 1953 in Puerto Tejada) is a retired Colombian footballer.

== Career ==
Viáfara played for Deportivo Pereira and América de Cali during his professional career. Viáfara made several appearances for the senior Colombia national football team, including participating at the 1983 Copa América.

He also played for Colombia at the 1980 Olympic Games in Moscow.
