= Óscar Quintabani =

Argentine footballer and manager (born 1950)

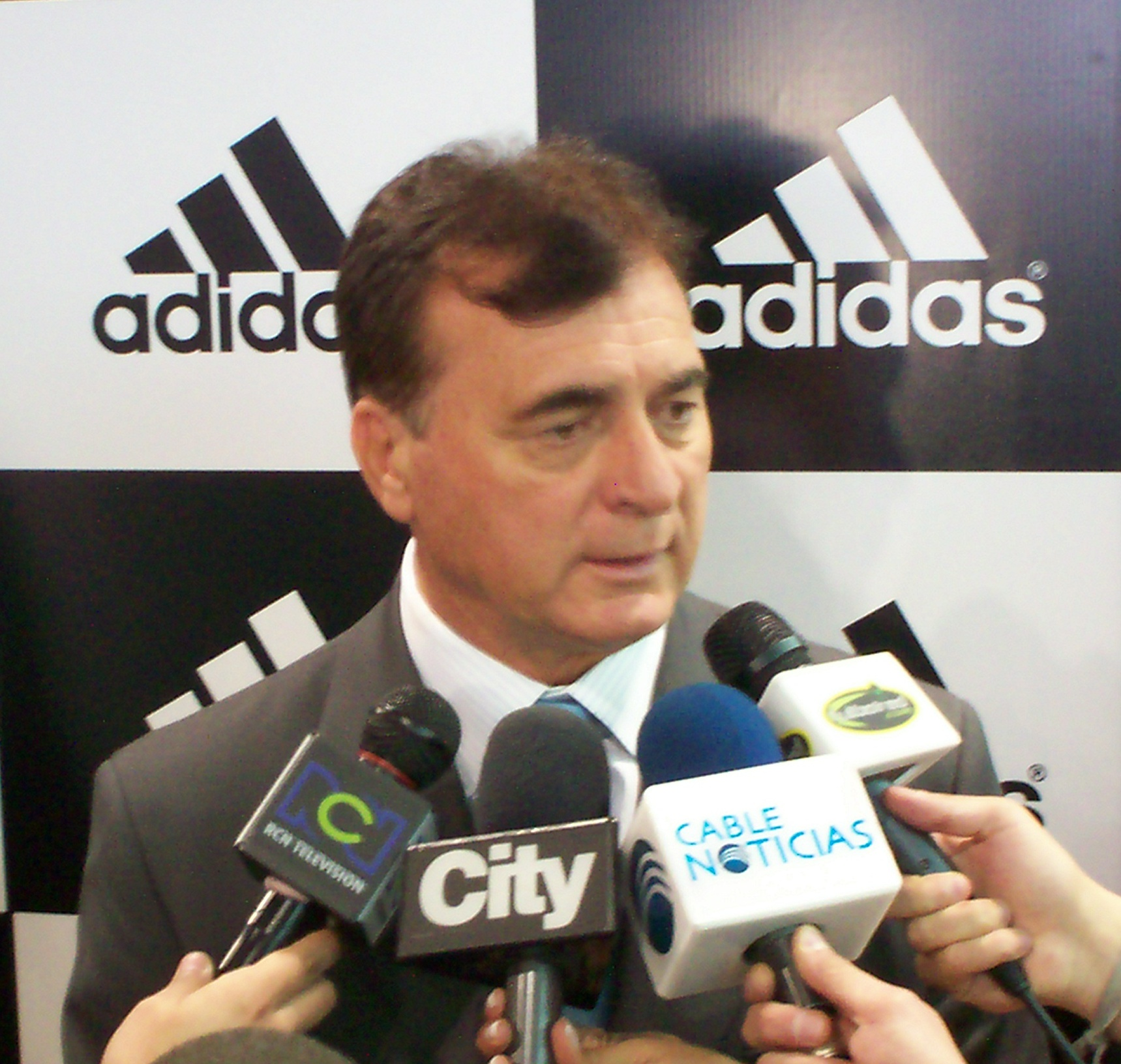
- Quintabani in 2008

Personal information
- Full name: Óscar Héctor Quintabani Faggionali
- Date of birth: 4 June 1950 (age 76)
- Place of birth: Buenos Aires, Argentina
- Position: Goalkeeper

Youth career
- River Plate

Senior career*
Years	Team	Apps	(Gls)
1974–1976	Argentinos Juniors	50	(0)
1977–1979	Once Caldas	46	(0)
1980–1981	Deportes Tolima	85	(0)
1982–1985	Deportivo Pereira	157	(0)

Managerial career
- 1990–1992: Deportivo Pereira
- 1995–1996: Deportivo Pereira
- 1996–1997: Deportes Quindío
- 1998–2002: Cortuluá
- 2002–2003: Deportivo Cali
- 2003: Deportivo Quito
- 2006: Deportivo Pasto
- 2006–2007: Atlético Nacional
- 2008–2009: Millonarios
- 2009–2010: Deportivo Pereira
- 2011: Junior
- 2012: Cúcuta Deportivo
- 2014: Rionegro Águilas
- 2015: Deportivo Pasto
- 2015: Rionegro Águilas
- 2017: Deportes Tolima
- 2020–2023: Deportes Quindío
- * Club domestic league appearances and goals

Óscar Héctor Quintabani Faggionali (born 4 June 1950) is an Argentine football manager and former player who played as a goalkeeper.

== Playing career ==
Quintabani began his playing career in the River Plate youth system, although he never made his breakthrough into the first team. He went on to play for Argentinos Juniors before continuing his career in Colombia with Once Caldas, Deportes Tolima, and Deportivo Pereira.

== Managerial career ==
After retiring as a player Quintabani took up coaching. He was manager of Deportivo Pereira, Deportes Quindío and Cortuluá in Colombia, then Deportivo Quito in Ecuador.

In 2006, he was appointed manager of Deportivo Pasto, he led the team to their first ever Colombian league championship in the Apertura 2006 championship. He then signed for Atlético Nacional where he won back-to-back championships in the Apertura and Clausura 2007 tournaments.

In May 2008 he quit as manager of Nacional to take over at Millonarios.

== Managerial titles ==
Season	Team	Title
Apertura 2006	Deportivo Pasto	Colombian league
Apertura 2007	Atlético Nacional	Colombian league
Clausura 2007	Atlético Nacional	Colombian league
