= Jaguares de Córdoba =

Colombian football club

- Full name: Jaguares de Córdoba Fútbol Club
- Nicknames: La Celeste de Colombia (Colombia's Sky Blue); Felinos (Felines); Fieras del Sinú (Beasts from the Sinú); La garra Caribe (The Caribbean Drive); Los Zenúes (The Zenúes); Sabaneros (Sabaners)
- Founded: 5 December 2012; 13 years ago
- Ground: Jaraguay
- Capacity: 12,000
- President: Nelson Soto
- Head coach: Julio Méndez (caretaker)
- League: Categoría Primera A
- 2025: Primera B, 1st of 16 (Torneo I champions, promoted)
- Website: www.jaguaresfc.com.co
Home colours	Away colours	Third colours

Jaguares de Córdoba is a professional Colombian football team based in Montería, that plays in Categoría Primera A. They were founded in 2012 and play their home games at the Jaraguay stadium.

== History ==
The team was created on 5 December 2012 at a meeting held by team president Nelson Soto Duque, the mayor of Montería, and the governor of Córdoba. In an initiative led by the Montería city hall and the Córdoba government, with support from local companies, an agreement was reached with the direction to move Sucre F.C. from Sincelejo to Montería from 2013 under the name Jaguares de Córdoba.

On February 3, 2013, the team debuted at the Primera B winning 2–1 against Real Cartagena, and the following year they earned promotion to the Categoría Primera A after winning the Torneo Postobón 2014-I by defeating América de Cali 5–1 on aggregate score in the final, and then beat 2014-II winners Deportes Quindío in the final of the year, winning 3–2 on aggregate score after losing the first leg 2–0 in the city of Armenia.

The best performance of the team in the top tier was achieved in the 2017 season. In the Torneo Apertura, the team placed 5th, thus qualifying for the knockout stage for the first time ever. The team was eliminated in the quarterfinals by Atlético Nacional. In the Torneo Finalización, the team placed 8th and qualified again for the knockout stage, again being eliminated in the quarterfinals, this time by Santa Fe. Jaguares ended the year placed 8th in the aggregate table, which qualified them to the 2018 Copa Sudamericana, the first time the team played in an international competition, losing to Boston River from Uruguay in the first stage.

== Players ==
=== Current squad ===
As of 24 September 2026

Note: Flags indicate national team as defined under FIFA eligibility rules; some limited exceptions apply. Players may hold more than one non-FIFA nationality.

No.	Pos.	Nation	Player
1	GK	COL	Diego Martínez
2	DF	COL	Andrés Alfonso
3	DF	COL	Jerson Malagón
4	DF	COL	Juan Franco
5	MF	COL	Royscer Colpa
6	DF	COL	Jonathan Lovera
7	FW	COL	Wilfrido de La Rosa
8	FW	COL	Duván Rodríguez
9	FW	COL	Johar Mejía
10	MF	ARG	Cristián Álvarez
11	FW	COL	Andrés Rentería (captain)
12	GK	COL	Franklin Mosquera
13	MF	COL	Johan Hinestroza
14	DF	COL	Edwin Martínez
15	FW	COL	Jader Maza

No.	Pos.	Nation	Player
16	MF	COL	Esteban Beltrán (on loan from Once Caldas)
17	FW	COL	Darwin López
18	FW	COL	Luis Jiménez
19	MF	COL	Carlos Cantillo (on loan from Junior)
20	FW	COL	Faber Gil
21	MF	COL	Rafael Bustamante
22	DF	COL	Nicolás Giraldo
23	DF	COL	Juan Arcila
24	FW	COL	Santiago Cubides
28	FW	COL	Diego Zuluaga
29	DF	COL	Carlos Henao
30	MF	COL	Ronal Pérez
—	GK	COL	Elio López
—	MF	COL	Faber Gracia

== Managers ==
- (Colombia) César Maturana (January 2013 – March 2013)
- (Colombia) Álvaro Zuluaga (March 2013 – June 2013)
- (Colombia) Alberto Suárez (July 2013 – June 2014)
- (Colombia) Héctor Estrada (August 2014 – December 2014)
- (Colombia) Carlos Castro (January 2015 – August 2015)
- (Colombia) Jorge Bernal (August 2015 – December 2015)
- (Colombia) Carlos Navarrete (January 2016 – April 2016)
- (Colombia) Hubert Bodhert (April 2016 – December 2017)
- (Colombia) José Rodríguez (January 2018 – August 2018)
- (Argentina) Flavio Robatto (September 2018 – October 2018)
- (Colombia) Julio Méndez (October 2018 – December 2018)
- (Colombia) Jhon Bodmer (January 2019 – March 2019)
- (Colombia) Óscar Upegui (March 2019 – August 2019)
- (Colombia) Jhon Bodmer (August 2019 – September 2019)
- (Argentina) Juan Cruz Real (September 2019 – June 2020)
- (Colombia) Alberto Suárez (July 2020 – May 2021)
- (Colombia) César Torres (May 2021 – May 2022)
- (Colombia) Grigori Méndez (May 2022 – September 2022)
- (Colombia) Alexis Márquez (September 2022 – November 2022)
- (Colombia) Carlos Restrepo (November 2022 – May 2023)
- (Colombia) Pompilio Páez (May 2023 – August 2023)
- (Colombia) Julio Méndez (August 2023 – September 2023)
- (Colombia) Carlos Hoyos (September 2023 – November 2023)
- (Colombia) Hubert Bodhert (November 2023 – April 2024)
- (Colombia) Julio Méndez (April 2024 – June 2024)
- (Argentina) Néstor Craviotto (July 2024 – August 2024)
- (Colombia) Édgar Carvajal (August 2024 – November 2024)
- (Colombia) Álvaro Hernández (December 2024 – November 2025)
- (Colombia) Alexis Márquez (November 2025 – February 2026)
- (Paraguay) Gustavo Florentín (February 2026 – March 2026)
- (Colombia) Hubert Bodhert (March 2026 – September 2026)

== Honours ==
=== Domestic ===
- Categoría Primera B
  - Winners (2): 2014, 2025–I

== See also ==
- Cultural significance of the jaguar in South America
