= Jorge Artigas (footballer) =

Argentine footballer

Personal information
- Full name: Jorge Ricardo Artigas Carrica
- Date of birth: December 16, 1975 (age 50)
- Place of birth: Buenos Aires, Argentina
- Height: 1.76 m (5 ft 9 in)
- Position: Midfielder

Team information
- Current team: Cúcuta Deportivo (Manager)

Senior career*
Years	Team	Apps	(Gls)
1995–2002	Cerro		
2003	Universitario Deportes		(7)
2003–2004	Deportes Tolima		
2004–2005	Danubio	25	(2)
2005–2006	Tijuana		
2006	Botafogo		
2006 –2007	Avaí		
2007–2008	Cerro	8	(1)
2008	Al-Ahli		
2008–2009	Dhofar Club		
2009–2010	Inti Gas Deportes	27	(2)
2011–2013	América de Cali	29	(9)
2013–2014	Central Español	16	(7)
2014	Huracán	6	(1)
2014–2015	Central Español	37	(13)

Managerial career
- 2015–2017: Central Español
- 2019: Defensor Sporting (assistant)
- 2020: Cúcuta Deportivo
- 2021: Deportivo Pereira
- * Club domestic league appearances and goals

Jorge Ricardo Artigas Carrica (born 16 December 1975 in Buenos Aires) is an Argentine retired footballer who played as a midfielder and manager.

== Coaching career ==
=== Central Español ===
After retiring in August 2015, Artigas was appointed manager of his last club Central Español. He left the position at the end of 2017.

=== Defensor Sporting ===
On 1 April 2019, Artigas was presented as Ignacio Risso's assistant manager at Defensor Sporting. Artigas and Risso knew each other from Danubio, where they played together from 2004 to 2005. Artiga left together with Risso, who was fired in December 2019.

=== Cúcuta Deportivo ===
In February 2020, Artigas was appointed manager of Colombian club Cúcuta Deportivo. He left the club at the end of 2020 with only three victories in 12 games.

=== Deportivo Pereira ===
Ahead of the 2021 season, Artigas was appointed manager of Deportivo Pereira. He was fired on 21 February 2021 after zero victories in eight games.
