= Leonardo Castro (footballer, born 1992) =

Colombian professional footballer

Personal information
- Full name: Leonardo Fabio Castro Méndez
- Date of birth: 14 June 1992 (age 34)
- Place of birth: El Tambo, Colombia
- Height: 1.74 m (5 ft 9 in)
- Position: Forward

Team information
- Current team: Millonarios
- Number: 23

Senior career*
Years	Team	Apps	(Gls)
2014–2015	Deportivo Pereira	52	(30)
2016–2021	Independiente Medellín	130	(31)
2022	Deportivo Pereira	44	(24)
2023–	Millonarios	93	(38)
- * Club domestic league appearances and goals as of 12 December 2025

Leonardo Fabio Castro Méndez (born 14 June 1992) is a Colombian professional footballer who plays as forward for Millonarios.

== Early life ==
Castro was born in El Tambo, Cauca, but moved to Pereira with his family at age 3. Growing up, he used to work in a waste management company and played recreational football games in order to make enough money to support his family. Before joining Deportivo Pereira, Castro had been rejected by Barranquilla F.C., Envigado F.C., and La Equidad.

== Career ==
Castro began his career with Deportivo Pereira of the Categoría Primera B in 2014.

In 2016, he moved to Independiente Medellín, where he was part of the squad that won the 2016 Apertura and the Copa Colombia in 2019 and 2020.

In 2022, Castro joined Pereira and finished league top scorer. He also led Pereira to their first ever title, scoring a goal in the first leg of the finals and then scoring a penalty in the penalty shootout in the second leg against Independiente Medellín.

Shortly after winning the league title with Pereira, Castro joined powerhouse Millonarios. In his debut on 29 January 2023, he scored twice in a 2–3 win against his former club Deportivo Pereira. Castro scored three more times during the season as Millonarios won the league title, himself participating in both legs of the finals against Atlético Nacional.

In the 2023 Copa Colombia, Castro scored seven times in eight matches to help Millonarios finish runner-up to rivals Nacional.

== Honours ==
=== Club ===
Independiente Medellín

- Categoría Primera A: 2016-I
- Copa Colombia: 2019, 2020

Deportivo Pereira

- Categoría Primera A: 2022-II

Millonarios

- Categoría Primera A: 2023-I
- Superliga Colombiana: 2024

=== Individual ===
- 2022 Categoría Primera A-II top scorer (15 goals).
- 2023 Copa Colombia top scorer (7 goals).
