= Grigori Méndez =

Colombian footballer and manager (born 1972)

Personal information
- Full name: Grigori Giovanni Méndez Granados
- Date of birth: 30 December 1972 (age 53)
- Place of birth: Bogotá, Colombia
- Position: Defender

Senior career*
Years	Team	Apps	(Gls)
1994–2000	Santa Fe		

Managerial career
- 2007–2010: Academia (youth)
- 2010: Academia (interim)
- 2010: Academia (assistant)
- 2010–2021: Santa Fe (youth)
- 2019: Santa Fe (assistant)
- 2021: Santa Fe
- 2022: Santa Fe (youth)
- 2022: Santa Fe (interim)
- 2022: Jaguares de Córdoba
- 2023–2025: Barranquilla (assistant)
- 2025: Barranquilla
- 2025: Santa Fe (interim)
- * Club domestic league appearances and goals

Grigori Giovanni Méndez Granados (born 30 December 1972) is a Colombian football manager and former footballer who played as a defender.

== Career ==
Méndez was born in Bogotá, and played for Independiente Santa Fe before moving to the United States in 2000 to work as a women's coach. He subsequently worked in Argentina with Quilmes before returning to his home country to work at Academia.

In 2010, Méndez returned to Santa Fe to work as a youth coach. He was also an assistant manager of the main squad in 2019, when Gerardo Bedoya was a manager.

On 23 August 2021, Méndez was named manager of Santa Fe's main squad, replacing Harold Rivera. He remained in the position until the end of the season when he was recalled to the club's under-20 squad, but was appointed as interim manager of the first squad shortly after the dismissal of manager Martín Cardetti in late April 2022.

On 27 May 2022, Méndez was announced as manager of Jaguares de Córdoba. On 13 September, Jaguares announced his resignation from the position.

On 22 November 2022, Méndez joined Categoría Primera B club Barranquilla as an assistant to Nelson Flórez. He was part of Flórez's coaching staff at Barranquilla until 28 March 2025, when the club announced the coach's departure and subsequently promoted Méndez to head coach. Méndez left Barranquilla on 23 July 2025.

Méndez returned to Santa Fe as an interim manager along with Francisco López on 24 September 2025, following the resignation of Jorge Bava.
