= Deportivo Pereira =

Association football club in Colombia

- Full name: Deportivo Pereira F.C. S.A.
- Nicknames: Los Matecañas (The Matecañas); El Grande Matecaña (The Matecaña Great); La Furia Matecaña (The Matecaña Fury); Aurirrojo (Yellow-and-Red); El Lobo (The Wolf)
- Founded: 12 February 1944; 82 years ago
- Ground: Hernán Ramírez Villegas
- Capacity: 30,297
- Owner(s): Blessd; Santiago Jaramillo
- President: Santiago Jaramillo
- Head coach: Alexis Márquez
- League: Categoría Primera A
- 2025: Primera A, 14th of 20
- Website: deportivopereira.com.co
Home colours	Away colours	Third colours

Deportivo Pereira is a professional Colombian football team based in Pereira, that currently plays in the Categoría Primera A. They play their home games at the Hernán Ramírez Villegas stadium.

== History ==
=== Early years ===
While there are several amateur teams from the Risaralda Department in the Third Division (Primera C), Pereira is the department's only professional team. Deportivo Pereira was founded on 12 February 1944 by Pedro Patiño 'Peruco', Luis Carlos Marulanda, Rogelio Díaz 'Control', Faustino Chiquito y Gabriel Cardona Rojas, aiming to end the rivalry between the local clubs Deportivo Otún and Vidriocol. On 12 March 1944 they played their first game, facing Guadalajara de Buga at Estadio Alberto Mora Mora in Pereira.

Deportivo Pereira made its First Division debut (Primera A) in the 1949 season, replacing Universidad, a football club founded in Bogotá that had played its previous season in the Pearl of the Otún River, nickname of the city of Pereira, but moved back to Bogotá for that season. Precisely, the team played its first game against that same team, losing 2–1. The team's first goal was scored by Ecuadorian player Humberto Suárez. Its first victory was against Atlético Bucaramanga, with a final score of 2–1 and goals scored by Omar Barahona and José “Mico” Zapata. A second victory was obtained against Bucaramanga, this time away from home and by a score of 4–3. The team's first victory playing at home was on 9 October 1949, beating Huracán de Medellín 4–1, with goals scored by Carmelo Enrique Colombo, José "Mico" Zapata, Inocencio Paz Lasso "Cencio" and an own goal from Huracan's player Santos Isaza. The first top scorer of the "Matecaña" (another of Pereira's nicknames) team was the Colombian Inocencio Paz Lasso "Cencio", with 11 goals. The team finished the season in last place with only 14 points.

The team's most successful campaigns were in 1952, 1962, 1966, and 1974, in which the team placed third. However the most remembered team was the one that competed in the 1982 season which was led by Gilberto Osorio. Their roster included Óscar Héctor Quintabani, "Ratón" Echeverri, Víctor Longo, Henry Viáfara, Gilberto Cabrera, Farid Perchy, Sergio Cierra, Benjamin "Mincho" Cardona, Eduardo Emilio Vilarete, Jairo "Chiqui" Aguirre, and as substitutes goalkeeper Reynel Ruiz, midfielders Manzi and Ponciano Castro and strikers Abel Augusto Lobatón, Hernán "Pistolero" Villa and Iván Darío "Chumi" Castañeda. The team finished the tournament in fourth place.

Deportivo Pereira also gained recognition for the large number of Paraguayan players that have joined its ranks starting from its early years, beginning with the arrival of player and manager César López Fretes, who managed the team for seven seasons between 1964 and 1970. The first Paraguayan in the squad was striker Carmelo Enrique Colombo who arrived in 1949, and from that moment onwards over 100 Paraguayan footballers have played for Deportivo Pereira throughout its history. By 1951, 10 out of the 11 starting players were Paraguayans who had participated in the 1950 FIFA World Cup with their national team, including Enrique Ávalos, Marcelino Vargas, and López Fretes himself. Other outstanding Paraguayan players at Deportivo Pereira were Casimiro Ávalos, who is the club's all-time top scorer with 141 goals, Ángel Chávez who played 276 matches with the team, Apolinar Paniagua, Alcides Sossa and Benicio Ferreira, among several others who even established their permanent residency in the city.

=== First relegation and return to Primera A ===
In 1991, Colombia's Dimayor created the second tier tournament Categoría Primera B, granting its champion the chance to promote to the first division (which became Categoría Primera A) and replace the last-placed team from the league, which would be demoted to the second division. In 1995, the team got a decent sixth place that placed it comfortably far from the second tier. However, during the 1997 Adecuación tournament, the team was relegated to Primera B for the first time after a 3–2 win for Deportivo Unicosta against Millonarios.

Deportivo Pereira played in the second tier for three seasons between 1998 and 2000, placing as runners-up in 1998 behind Deportivo Pasto and third the following year. In 2000 they eventually won the Primera B tournament and returned to the top tier. In that season they were led by coach Walter Aristizábal and players such as Rafael Castillo, Guillermo Berrío, Hernán Darío Cardona, Daniel Vélez and Jairo Serna.

=== Ups and downs and second relegation ===
Since their return to the top flight for the 2001 season, Deportivo Pereira reached the semi-finals of the Primera A tournament five times: in the 2003 Apertura, 2005 Finalización, 2006 Apertura, 2008 Finalización, and 2009 Finalización. The best campaign of those was the 2008 one, in which the team managed by Luis Fernando Suárez advanced to the semi-finals in sixth place with 28 points and ended missing out on the final after placing second in their group behind the eventual champions América de Cali. In the final table of that tournament, Deportivo Pereira placed fourth, behind América, runners-up Independiente Medellín, and Deportes Tolima.

In spite of those good campaigns, Pereira were still troubled with relegation: in 2007, the team finished second to last in the relegation table and had to play a relegation playoff against the 2007 Primera B runners-up Academia. Deportivo Pereira were able to keep their place in Primera A, beating Academia 4–2 on aggregate thanks to striker Óscar Restrepo. The following year, they only avoided relegation on the last day of the regular season, defeating Atlético Bucaramanga 3–0 and sending them to the second tier instead, and in 2009 they had to play the relegation playoff again, beating Bucaramanga 5–3 on aggregate.

A democratization process of the club was started by the end of 2008. After several months of legal processes, the club was confirmed by the División Mayor del Fútbol Colombiano (Dimayor) and the Colombian Football Federation as Deportivo Pereira S.A., led by Luis Fernando Osorio Acevedo. However in September 2010 it returned to its previous owners, the López Bedoya family, as they argued that Osorio had failed to pay the agreed fee for their shares.

In the 2010 Finalización tournament, Deportivo Pereira failed to win a single game in the first stage, placing second-from-bottom with nine draws and nine losses, and the situation did not improve in the immediately following tournament, the 2011 Apertura, in which they only won one game out of 18 and placed last, that only victory being in the derby against Once Caldas where they broke a record 34-game winless streak. Although they had chances to qualify for the final stages of the 2011 Finalización tournament, those previous poor campaigns took their toll in the relegation table and Deportivo Pereira were relegated to Primera B for the second time on 5 November 2011 by losing 1–0 against Deportes Tolima in Ibagué.

=== Second spell in Primera B and administrative crisis ===
In the second tournament of the 2012 Primera B season, and under the leadership of manager Octavio Zambrano, Deportivo Pereira achieved a points record with a total of 43 points out of 54 possible obtained in a single season, making it the first team to have achieved this number in a single campaign. However, the club missed the chance to return to the top flight in the semi-finals.

On 29 October 2013, Coldeportes announced in a statement that it was withdrawing the sporting license (reconocimiento deportivo) of the Social, Sports and Cultural Corporation of Pereira (Corpereira), due to the recurrence of non-compliance with their labor obligations, reason for which Deportivo Pereira could not carry out any sports-related activity while said sanction was not lifted. Coldeportes had renewed the club's license after it entered bankruptcy law and committed to pay its debts within the deadlines set by law. However, when carrying out inspection and control, the government entity again found failures in the payment of salaries, social security and parafiscal contributions, which compelled them to withdraw Pereira's sporting license. Although attempts to create another team to represent the city due to Deportivo Pereira's administrative issues and potential dissolution were made, in November the club was able to pay nearly COP 180 million to its creditors to have its sanction lifted by Coldeportes. With their sporting license reinstated, Pereira were eventually able to compete in the 2014 season, in which they again failed to earn promotion.

In early 2015, Deportivo Pereira along with other seven traditional teams took part in a special promotion tournament in Bogotá, in which two teams would be promoted to the top flight which expanded to 20 teams starting from that season. However, they again failed to promote as they placed last in their group which was won by Cortuluá. In the Primera B tournament itself, they qualified for the semi-finals in second place with 60 points but failed to advance to the finals and earn promotion as they ended in second place of their group behind Fortaleza.

In 2016, Deportivo Pereira placed first in the regular stage of the Primera B tournament with 70 points in 32 matches, 22 wins, 4 draws and 6 losses, scoring 58 goals and conceding 28, for a 73% performance. In this tournament they got their biggest win in the second tier, thrashing Atlético F.C. 7–2 on 1 August. In the semi-finals, they played in Group A against Leones, Tigres, and Bogotá. This was the closest Deportivo Pereira were to clinch promotion, as they were defeating Leones 2–1 on the last round of the semi-finals and winning their group. However, a last-minute equalizer by the team from Itagüí ended up dashing Pereira's promotion hopes since Tigres defeated Bogotá to win the group as well as promotion to Primera A.

=== Promotion, first league title and Copa Libertadores debut ===
Deportivo Pereira stayed in the second tier until the 2019 season in which they won both of the season's short tournaments and topped the aggregate table with 90 points, defeating Cortuluá in the Torneo Apertura finals and Boyacá Chicó in the Finalización finals to clinch their second Primera B title as well as direct promotion to the top flight.

Since their return to Primera A for the 2020 season, Deportivo Pereira have been able to avoid relegation consistently while also making some deep campaigns, losing the final of the Liguilla tournament to Millonarios in 2020. In 2021, and managed by their former player Alexis Márquez, Deportivo Pereira made history by qualifying for the finals of the Copa Colombia after beating Deportes Tolima in the semi-finals. There they faced Atlético Nacional, losing 5–1 on aggregate.

Under the managerial direction of Alejandro Restrepo, who replaced Alexis Márquez for the 2022 Finalización tournament, Deportivo Pereira qualified for their first Primera A championship final. The Matecañas, backed by the scoring prowess of striker Leonardo Castro as well as a strong campaign away from Pereira that saw them become the tournament's best away side by winning in Montería, Cali, Ibagué, Bogotá, and Bucaramanga during the first stage of the tournament, advanced to the semi-finals in fifth place with 32 points. For the semi-finals, they were drawn in Group A along with Bogotá sides Santa Fe and Millonarios as well as Junior from Barranquilla, advancing to their first final in the Colombian first division after a 2–0 win over Junior in Barranquilla and a 1–1 draw in the Bogotá derby on the last matchday of the semi-finals which allowed them to win Group A with 12 points and face Independiente Medellín in the tournament's final series. After a 1–1 draw in the first leg and a scoreless draw in the return leg played in Pereira, the Matecañas defeated Independiente Medellín 4–3 on a penalty shootout to claim their first Primera A title, as well as qualification for their first Copa Libertadores.

Deportivo Pereira took part in the Copa Libertadores for the first time in 2023, being drawn into Group F along with Argentine side Boca Juniors, Colo-Colo from Chile, and Monagas from Venezuela. Their first match in the competition was a 1–1 draw at home with Colo-Colo, and they later went on to narrowly lose to Boca Juniors in Buenos Aires. A couple of wins in their remaining matches at home against Monagas and Boca Juniors as well as another draw with Colo-Colo in Santiago were enough for Pereira to advance out of the group in second place with 8 points, facing Ecuadorian side Independiente del Valle in the round of 16. The first leg, hosted by Pereira, ended with a 1–0 win for the Colombian side, whilst in the return leg played in Quito the Matecaña side drew 1–1 to advance to the quarter-finals of the competition. In that round they faced Brazilian side Palmeiras, losing 4–0 in the first leg played at home. Pereira ended their maiden Copa Libertadores participation with a scoreless draw at Allianz Parque in São Paulo in the second leg.

== Stadium ==
Deportivo Pereira play their home matches at Estadio Hernán Ramírez Villegas, with a capacity of 30,297 and opened in 1971. From their foundation in 1944 to 1971, they played their home matches at Estadio Alberto Mora Mora also located in Pereira, in its Kennedy neighborhood to the east of the city. This stadium became known as El Fortín de Libaré ("Libaré's little fort") due to the strength that Deportivo Pereira came to acquire playing there, to the extent that visiting teams considered a draw there as a very good result.

== Honours ==
=== Domestic ===
- Categoría Primera A
  - Winners (1): 2022–II
- Categoría Primera B
  - Winners (2): 2000, 2019
- Copa Colombia
  - Runners-up (1): 2021
- Superliga Colombiana
  - Runners-up (1): 2023

== Performance in CONMEBOL competitions ==
- Copa Libertadores: 1 appearance

2023: Quarter-finals

== Players ==
=== Current squad ===
As of 7 September 2026

Note: Flags indicate national team as defined under FIFA eligibility rules; some limited exceptions apply. Players may hold more than one non-FIFA nationality.

No.	Pos.	Nation	Player
1	GK	COL	Yimmy Gómez (on loan from Independiente Medellín)
2	DF	COL	Sebastián Urrea
3	MF	COL	Nicolás Rengifo
5	MF	COL	Jorge Bermúdez
6	DF	PAR	Danilo Ortiz
7	MF	COL	Anderson Plata
10	MF	COL	Sebastián Acosta
11	MF	COL	Jhon Largacha (on loan from Millonarios)
12	GK	COL	Juan Betancourth
13	FW	COL	Yúber Quiñones
14	MF	COL	Ederson Moreno
15	DF	COL	Santiago Aguilar
16	DF	COL	Eber Moreno
18	FW	COL	Marco Pérez
19	MF	COL	Miguel Aguirre
20	DF	ARM	Jordy Monroy (on loan from Santa Fe)
21	DF	COL	Walmer Pacheco (captain)

No.	Pos.	Nation	Player
23	DF	ARG	Tobías Bovone
24	FW	COL	Miguel Palacios
25	DF	COL	Fabio Delgado
26	MF	COL	Jhon Montoya
27	MF	COL	Juan Morales
29	FW	COL	Manuel Díaz
31	FW	COL	Andrés Calderón
34	DF	COL	Santiago Alzate
35	DF	COL	Matías López
37	MF	COL	Luis Moreno
39	DF	COL	Alejandro Giraldo
40	DF	GUA	Jared Rodríguez
—	GK	COL	Jorge Martínez
—	DF	COL	Jhonny Jordán
—	DF	COL	Josseph Mosquera
—	DF	COL	Richard Rentería

=== Out on loan ===
Note: Flags indicate national team as defined under FIFA eligibility rules; some limited exceptions apply. Players may hold more than one non-FIFA nationality.

No.	Pos.	Nation	Player

=== World Cup players ===
The following players were chosen to represent their country at the FIFA World Cup while contracted to Deportivo Pereira.

- (Colombia) Eusebio Escobar Ramírez (1962)
- (Colombia) José Antonio Rada (1962)
- (Colombia) Achito Vivas (1962)

== Notable players ==
- (Paraguay) Casimiro Ávalos (1950–1953),(1956–1961)
- (Colombia) Henry Viáfara (1973–1983)
- (Colombia) Luis Pompilio Páez (1981–1988)
- (Peru) Abel Augusto Lobatón (1982–1985)
- (Peru) César Cueto (1986)
- (Colombia) Mauricio Serna (1990)
- (Paraguay) Eumelio Palacios (1992)
- (Colombia) Óscar Díaz (1993–1996), (1997)
- (Colombia) Rubén Darío Hernández (1994)
- (Ecuador) Hólger Quiñónez (1996–1997)
- (Colombia) Jesús Sinisterra (1996–1997)
- (Colombia) Carlos Rodas (1996–1997)
- (Paraguay) Vidal Sanabria (1997)
- (Colombia) Jhonny Acosta (2001–2004), (2006–2009), (2010)
- (Equatorial Guinea) Danny Quendambú (2002)
- (Colombia) René Higuita (2002–2003), (2008–2009)
- (Colombia) Leonel Álvarez (2002–2003)
- (Colombia) Jair Benítez (2003)
- (Venezuela) Ricardo Páez (2004)
- (Colombia) Milton Rodríguez (2004)
- (Colombia) Diego Arias (2004–2009)
- (Panama) Gabriel Gómez (2005)
- (Panama) Orlando Rodríguez (2005)
- (Colombia) Jersson González (2005–2006)
- (Colombia) Julián Estiven Vélez (2005–2006)
- (Colombia) José Andrés "Chepe" Ramírez (2005–2015)
- (Colombia) Jorge Bermúdez (2006)
- (Colombia) Carlos Andrés Ramírez (2006–2008), (2012–2013), (2021–2023)
- (Ecuador) Eduardo Hurtado (2007)
- (Colombia) Carlos Quintero (2008), (2024–2025)
- (Uruguay) Juan Martín Parodi (2008), (2010)
- (Colombia) Fernando Uribe (2009)
- (Paraguay) Edison Giménez (2009)
- (Ecuador) Edwin Tenorio (2009)
- (Ecuador) Christian Lara (2009)
- (Colombia) Gustavo Victoria (2009–2012)
- (Argentina) Germán Cano (2011)
- (Colombia) Róbinson Zapata (2011)
- (Colombia) Freddy Grisales (2011)
- (Colombia) Jhon Viáfara (2011)
- (Paraguay) Jorge Brítez (2011)
- (Paraguay) Carlos Villagra (2011)
- (Uruguay) Diego Vera (2011)
- (Ecuador) Edwin Villafuerte (2012)
- (Colombia) Leonardo Castro (2014-2016), (2022)
- (Colombia) Cucho Hernández (2015-2016)
- (Colombia) Harlen Castillo (2015–2022)
- (Colombia) Jhonny Vásquez (2019–2024)
- (Colombia) Yilmar Velasquez (2022–2023)

== Club captains ==
- (Colombia) Jhonny Vásquez (2019–2023)
- (Colombia) Carlos Ramírez (2023)
- (Colombia) Jhonny Vásquez (2024)

== Managers ==
Name	Starting	Ending	Nationality
Luigi Di Franco	1949	1950	Italy
Gerardo González Aquino	1989	1989	Paraguay
Nelson Abadía	1989	1990	Colombia
Oscar Héctor Quintabani	1990	1992	Argentina; Colombia
Eduardo Julián Retat	1992	1993	France; Colombia
Oswaldo Calero (interim)	1993	1993	Colombia
Luis Fernando Suárez	1994	1995	Colombia
Oscar Héctor Quintabani	1995	1996	Argentina; Colombia
Humberto Ortiz Echavarría	1996	1997	Colombia
Hugo Tobón	1997	1997	Colombia
Luis Fernando Herrera (interim)	1997	1997	Colombia
Polaco Escobar	1998	1998	Colombia
José Alberto Suárez	1999	1999	Colombia
Juan Eugenio Jiménez	1999	1999	Colombia
Walter Aristizábal	2000	2001	Colombia
Alexis García	2001	2001	Colombia
Carlos Restrepo Isaza	2002	2002	Colombia
Walter Aristizábal	2003	2003	Colombia
Néstor Otero	2004	2004	Colombia
Walter Aristizábal	2005	2006	Colombia
Carlos Navarrete Zuleta	October 2006	March 2007	Colombia
Hugo Castaño	March 2007	August 2007	Colombia
Hugo Gallego	August 2007	December 2007	Colombia
Edgar Ospina	January 2008	May 2008	Colombia
Luis Fernando Suárez	May 2008	December 2008	Colombia
Pedro Sarmiento	January 2009	May 2009	Colombia
Adrián Magnoli (interim)	May 2009	June 2009	Argentina; Colombia
Oscar Héctor Quintabani	June 2009	May 2010	Argentina; Colombia
Walter Aristizábal	May 2010	September 2010	Colombia
Einar Angulo	October 2010	April 2011	Colombia
Julio Comesaña	April 2011	September 2011	Uruguay
Alfredo Araújo	September 2011	December 2011	Colombia
Octavio Zambrano	January 2012	April 2013	Ecuador
Jesús Barrios	April 2013	March 2014	Colombia
Jairo Aguirre	April 2014	May 2014	Colombia
José Fernando Santa	May 2014	December 2014	Colombia
Hernán Lisi	January 2015	December 2015	Argentina
Néstor Craviotto	January 2016	December 2016	Argentina
Alberto Bulleri	January 2017	December 2017	Argentina
José Fernando Santa	January 2018	December 2018	Colombia
Néstor Craviotto	December 2018	October 2020	Argentina
José Alexis Márquez	November 2020	December 2020	Colombia
Jorge Artigas	January 2021	February 2021	Uruguay
José Alexis Márquez	March 2021	May 2022	Colombia
Alejandro Restrepo	June 2022	November 2023	Colombia
Leonel Álvarez	November 2023	June 2024	Colombia
Luis Fernando Suárez	June 2024	April 2025	Colombia
Rafael Dudamel	April 2025	October 2025	Venezuela; Colombia
Arturo Reyes	January 2026	October 2026	Colombia
José Alexis Márquez	October 2026		Colombia

Source: Worldfootball.net
