= Ricardo Márquez (Colombian footballer) =

Colombian footballer (born 1997)

Personal information
- Full name: Ricardo Luis Márquez González
- Date of birth: 9 November 1997 (age 29)
- Place of birth: Santa Marta, Colombia
- Height: 1.80 m (5 ft 11 in)
- Position: Forward

Team information
- Current team: Cartaginés
- Number: 21

Youth career
- 2015: Millonarios
- 2016–2017: Unión Magdalena

Senior career*
Years	Team	Apps	(Gls)
2018–2025	Unión Magdalena	130	(56)
2020–2022	→ Millonarios (loan)	52	(7)
2024	→ Bucaramanga (loan)	13	(0)
2026–	Cartaginés	17	(1)

International career
2020	Colombia U23	6	(0)
- * Club domestic league appearances and goals as of 10 May 2026

Ricardo Luis Márquez González (9 November 1997) is a Colombian footballer who plays as a forward for Costa Rican club Cartaginés.

== Career statistics ==
=== Club ===
As of 9 November 2023

Club	Division	Season	League			Cup			Continental			Total
Club	Division	Season	Apps	Goals	Assists	Apps	Goals	Assists	Apps	Goals	Assists	Apps	Goals	Assists
Unión Magdalena	Categoría Primera B	2018	26	20	0	2	0	0	—			28	20	0
Unión Magdalena	Categoría Primera A	2019	34	11	2	—			—			34	11	2
Unión Magdalena	Categoría Primera B	2020	3	0	0	1	0	0	—			4	0	0
Unión Magdalena	Categoría Primera A	2022	16	9	1	3	1	0	—			19	10	1
Unión Magdalena	Categoría Primera A	2023	32	7	3	2	1	0	—			34	8	3
Unión Magdalena	Total		111	47	6	8	2	0	0	0	0	119	49	6
Millonarios	Categoría Primera A	2020	14	4	2	1	0	0	2	0	0	17	4	2
Millonarios	Categoría Primera A	2021	25	3	0	2	0	0	—			27	3	0
Millonarios	Categoría Primera A	2022	13	0	0	1	0	0	1	0	0	15	0	0
Millonarios	Total		52	7	2	4	0	0	3	0	0	59	7	2
Career total			163	54	8	12	2	0	3	0	0	178	56	8

== Honours ==
=== Atlético Bucaramanga ===
- Categoría Primera A (1): 2024-I
