= Fernando Velasco (football manager) =

Colombian football manager

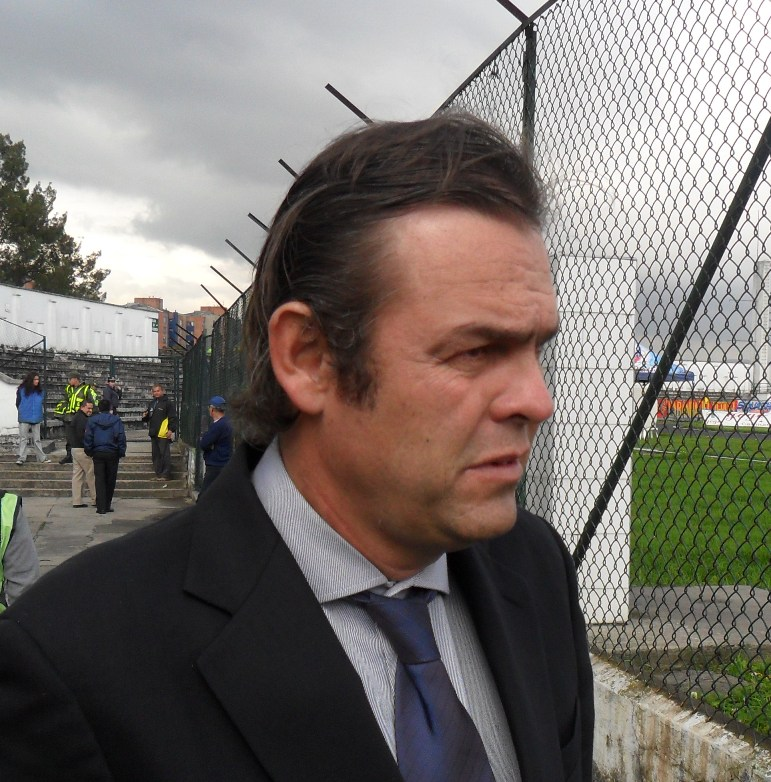

Personal information
- Full name: Fernando Velasco Gutiérrez
- Date of birth: 20 October 1964 (age 62)
- Place of birth: Cali, Colombia
- Height: 1.87 m (6 ft 2 in)

Managerial career
- Years: Team
- 1998–2002: América de Cali (assistant)
- 2004–2006: Cortuluá
- 2007: Deportes Tolima (assistant)
- 2007: Guaros (assistant)
- 2008–2010: Cortuluá
- 2010: Bogotá
- 2011: Atlético Bucaramanga
- 2011–2013: Cortuluá
- 2013: Cortuluá (youth)
- 2014–2015: Unión Magdalena
- 2015: América de Cali
- 2016–2017: Cúcuta Deportivo
- 2018–2022: Cortuluá (youth)
- 2018: Cortuluá (interim)
- 2022: Cortuluá (interim)
- 2022: Cortuluá

Fernando Velasco Gutiérrez (born 20 October 1964) is a Colombian football manager.

== Career ==
Born in Cali, Velasco was an assistant of Jaime de la Pava at América de Cali before being named manager of CD Escuela Carlos Sarmiento Lora in 2003. In September of the following year, he was appointed interim manager of Cortuluá, later suffering relegation but remaining in charge of the side until 2006.

After working as de la Pava's assistant at Deportes Tolima and Venezuelan side Guaros during the 2007 season, Velasco returned to managerial duties ahead of the 2008 campaign, in charge of former side Cortuluá. He led the club back to the Categoría Primera A in 2009 as champions, but resigned on 19 May 2010.

On 12 August 2010, Velasco was appointed at the helm of Categoría Primera B team Bogotá FC. He took over fellow league team Atlético Bucaramanga on 2 December, but was sacked the following 19 May.

Velasco returned to Tuluá on 23 September 2011, and remained in charge of the first team until 6 July 2013, when he was demoted to the youth categories. On 5 November of that year, he was named Unión Magdalena manager.

Velasco left Magdalena to return to América de Cali on 4 February 2015, now as manager. Sacked on 12 August, he was named in charge of Cúcuta Deportivo on 20 September 2016.

Velasco was dismissed by Cúcuta on 21 March 2017, being replaced by Flavio Robatto. He then subsequently returned to Cortuluá to work in the youth categories, acting as an interim manager of the main squad on two occasions before being permanently appointed manager on 19 September 2022.

== Honours ==
Cortuluá

- Categoría Primera B: 2009
