= Estadio Jaraguay =

Stadium in Montería, Colombia

- Monumental del Sinú (Monumental of the Sinú)
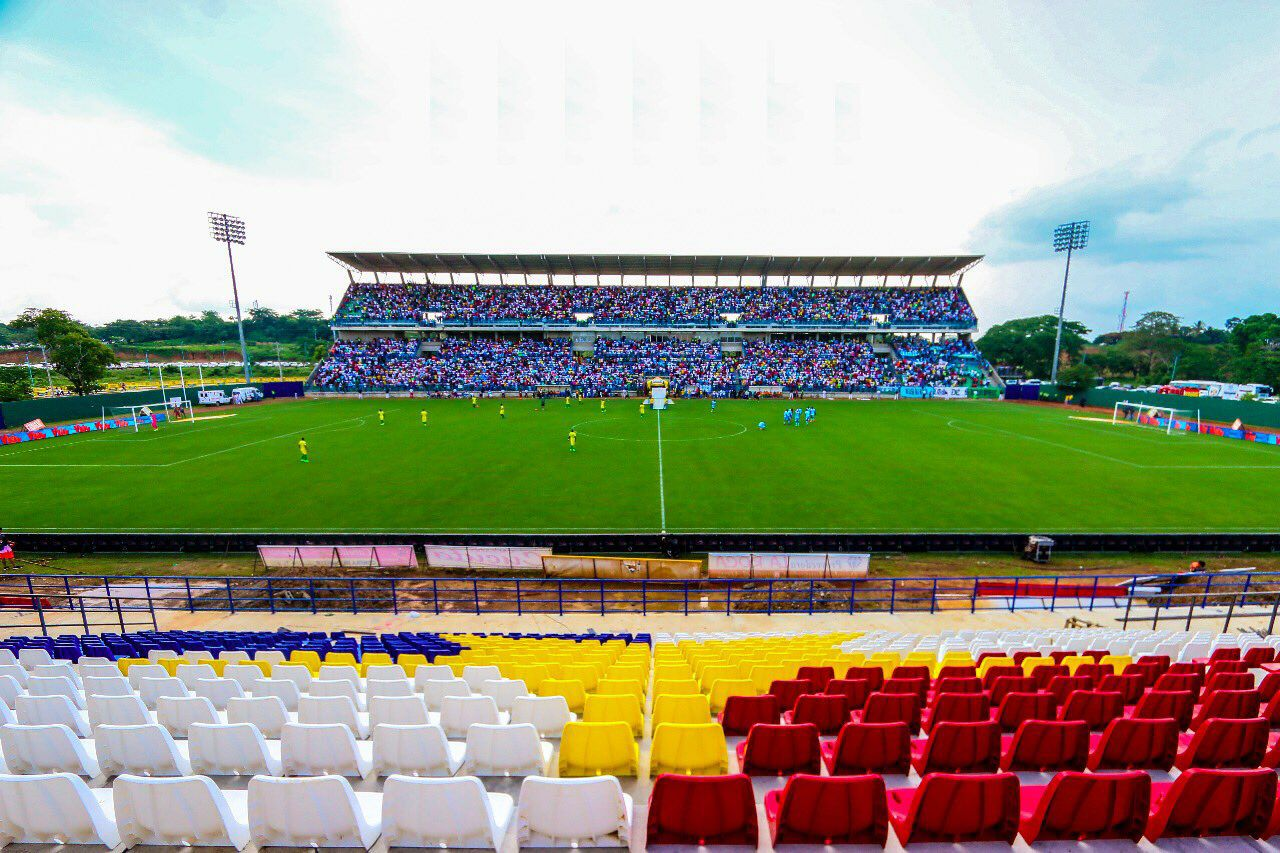
- Interactive map of Estadio Jaraguay
- Location: Montería, Colombia
- Coordinates: 8.711778°N 75.827639°W
- Owner: Municipality of Montería
- Capacity: 12,000
- Surface: grass
- Field size: 105x68

Construction
- Opened: 2012
- Expanded: 2017

Tenant
- Jaguares de Córdoba

Estadio Jaraguay (known as Estadio Municipal de Montería until December 2015) is a multi-use stadium in Montería, Colombia. It is currently used mostly for football matches. The stadium was built in 2012 for the National Games of Colombia, with a capacity of 8,000 people, which was raised by 4,000 seats in 2017 with the construction of a new grandstand in the stadium's eastern side. Jaguares de Córdoba play their home matches at this stadium.

In December 2015, the stadium was renamed to Jaraguay after the name was chosen from a list provided by citizens in a contest organized through the website of the Municipality of Montería. Jaraguay was a Zenú Cacique who ruled in what is now Montería.
