= Pompilio Páez =

Colombian footballer (born 1959)

Personal information
- Full name: Luis Pompilio Páez Castellanos
- Date of birth: 18 December 1959 (age 66)
- Place of birth: Pereira, Colombia
- Position: Defensive midfielder

Senior career*
Years	Team	Apps	(Gls)
1981–1988	Deportivo Pereira	336	(12)
1989	América de Cali		
1990	Deportes Quindío		
1990–1994	Deportivo Pereira		

Managerial career
- 1995–1996: Deportivo Pereira (assistant)
- 1996–1997: Deportes Quindío (assistant)
- 1998–2002: Cortuluá (assistant)
- 2002–2003: Deportivo Cali (assistant)
- 2003: Deportivo Quito (assistant)
- 2006: Deportivo Pasto (assistant)
- 2006–2007: Millonarios (assistant)
- 2007–2008: Chicago Fire (assistant)
- 2008: Herediano (assistant)
- 2008–2009: New York Red Bulls (assistant)
- 2010–2011: Once Caldas (assistant)
- 2012: Once Caldas
- 2012–2015: Atlético Nacional (assistant)
- 2015: São Paulo (assistant)
- 2015–2018: Mexico (assistant)
- 2017: Mexico (interim)
- 2019–2020: Atletico Nacional (assistant)
- 2020: Atletico Nacional (caretaker)
- 2021–2022: América de Cali (assistant)
- 2022: América de Cali (caretaker)
- 2023: Jaguares de Córdoba
- * Club domestic league appearances and goals

Luis Pompilio Páez Castellanos (born 18 December 1959) is a Colombian former footballer.

== Club career ==
Pompilio began his playing career with Deportivo Pereira in 1981 through 1988 becoming the most capped player in the club's history.

== Managerial career ==
=== Mexico National Team ===
In July 2017, Pompilo the assistant manager of Mexico, took charge after the manager Juan Carlos Osorio received a 6 match ban for his actions in 2017 FIFA Confederations Cup, which then excluded Osorio from participating in the management of the 2017 CONCACAF Gold Cup.
