= 2013 Categoría Primera B season =

Colombian football season

Torneo Postobón
- Season: 2013
- Champions: Apertura: Uniautónoma FC; Finalización: Fortaleza F.C. Season: Uniautónoma FC
- Promoted: Uniautónoma FC; Fortaleza F.C. (via promotion playoff)
- Relegated: None
- Top goalscorer: Apertura: Martín Arzuaga (22 goals); Finalización: Jhony Cano (13 goals)

The 2013 Categoría Primera B season was the 24th season since its founding and was officially called the 2013 Torneo Postobón for sponsorship reasons.

== Format ==
The season consisted of two tournaments: the 'Torneo Apertura' and the 'Torneo Finalización'. Each tournament will have an identical format of eighteen rounds with a round of regional derbies in the ninth round. At the end of the first eighteen rounds, the eight best-placed team will advance to the Semifinal round where teams will be sorted into groups and play a short double Round-robin tournament group stage. The winner of each group will advance to the Final round, which will consist of two legs. The winner will advance to the season final at the end of the Torneo Finalización, with its winner being promoted to the Categoría Primera A.

== Current teams ==
Club	Home city	Stadium	Head coach
América	Cali	Pascual Guerrero	Diego Umaña
Atlético Bucaramanga	Bucaramanga	Alfonso López	Bernardo Redín
Barranquilla F.C.	Barranquilla	Romelio Martínez	Arturo Reyes
Bogotá F.C.	Bogotá	Metropolitano de Techo	Germán Morales
Cortuluá	Tuluá	Doce de Octubre	Néstor Rodríguez
Depor F.C.	Cali	Pascual Guerrero	Victor Sicachá
Deportivo Pereira	Pereira	Hernán Ramirez Villegas	Jesús Alberto Barrios
Deportivo Rionegro	Rionegro	Alberto Grisales	Álvaro Hernández
Expreso Rojo	Facatativá	Jorge Torres Rocha	Jhon Jairo Bodmer
Fortaleza	Zipaquirá	Municipal Los Zipas	Jaime Manjarrés
Jaguares	Montería	Municipal de Montería	José Alberto Suarez
Llaneros F.C.	Villavicencio	Manuel Calle Lombana	Alberto Rujana
Real Cartagena	Cartagena	Jaime Morón León	José Fernando Santa
Real Santander	Bucaramanga; Floridablanca	Alfonso López; Álvaro Gómez Hurtado	Victor Hugo González
Unión Magdalena	Santa Marta; Riohacha	Eduardo Santos; Federico Serrano Soto	Waldir Manga
Uniautónoma F.C.	Sabanalarga	Marcos Henríquez	José Manuel Rodríguez
Universitario	Popayán	Ciro López	Jhon Jairo López
Valledupar F.C.	Valledupar	Armando Maestre Pavajeau	Hugo Arrieta

== Torneo Apertura ==
=== First stage ===
==== Standings ====
Pos	Team	Pld	W	D	L	GF	GA	GD	Pts	Qualification
1	América	18	12	3	3	31	8	+23	39	Advance to the Semifinals
2	Uniautónoma	18	9	5	4	34	20	+14	32	Advance to the Semifinals
3	Bogotá	18	9	3	6	32	23	+9	30	Advance to the Semifinals
4	Llaneros	18	8	6	4	20	17	+3	30	Advance to the Semifinals
5	Rionegro	18	9	2	7	31	28	+3	29	Advance to the Semifinals
6	Cortuluá	18	8	5	5	25	23	+2	29	Advance to the Semifinals
7	Unión Magdalena	18	9	2	7	22	20	+2	29	Advance to the Semifinals
8	Valledupar	18	7	7	4	29	13	+16	28	Advance to the Semifinals
9	Depor	18	9	1	8	20	23	−3	28	
10	Atlético Bucaramanga	18	7	5	6	23	22	+1	26	
11	Jaguares	18	7	4	7	21	24	−3	25	
12	Real Cartagena	18	7	3	8	25	19	+6	24	
13	Deportivo Pereira	18	7	2	9	28	29	−1	23	
14	Expreso Rojo	18	6	4	8	20	25	−5	22	
15	Fortaleza	18	5	4	9	17	25	−8	19	
16	Real Santander	18	5	3	10	22	35	−13	18	
17	Barranquilla	18	4	1	13	14	36	−22	13	
18	Universitario de Popayán	18	2	4	12	17	41	−24	10	

Rules for classification: 1st points; 2nd goal difference; 3rd goals scored; 4th away goals scored; 5th away goals against; 6th draw.

==== Results ====
Home \ Away	AME	BAR	BUC	BOG	COR	DEP	PER	EXP	FOR	JAG	LLA	RCA	RSA	RIO	MAG	UPO	UAU	VAL
América		5–1				2–0	3–0	4–1	3–0	4–0		0–0		1–0			1–0	
Barranquilla			1–3	2–1	0–1	1–2					1–0		0–2		1–2		3–2	0–2
Atlético Bucaramanga	0–1						2–0	2–0	0–0	1–1		2–1	2–2	1–0			3–1	
Bogotá	1–2		3–1			3–1		1–0			0–0		3–0		2–0	3–1		0–1
Cortuluá	2–1		3–0	1–1		2–1					1–1		4–1		1–2	3–2		0–3
Depor	1–0		2–2					2–0		2–1	0–3			0–1		1–0	2–1	2–1
Deportivo Pereira		2–2		4–2	0–1	0–1					0–0	1–2	5–3	0–3	4–0			
Expreso Rojo		1–0			2–0		0–2		1–2	1–1		2–1		1–0		2–0	2–2	
Fortaleza		2–0		1–2	1–1	2–0	0–1	1–2				2–1	2–0		0–0			
Jaguares		1–0		3–0	2–0		1–3		1–0			2–1			2–1	2–0	1–1	
Llaneros	1–0		2–1	0–3				2–1	2–0	1–1				1–0			1–3	2–1
Real Cartagena		3–0		1–1	2–0	2–1				2–0	2–0		1–2		0–2			1–1
Real Santander	0–2		1–0			0–1		2–2		1–0	2–2			3–4		2–1		0–2
Rionegro		2–1		3–5	1–2		2–1		4–0	3–2		2–1				2–1	0–4	
Unión Magdalena	0–1		1–2			2–1		2–1			0–1		2–0	2–2		4–0		1–0
Universitario de Popayán	1–1	0–1	3–1		1–1		2–4		3–2		1–1	0–2						0–8
Uniautónoma		5–0		1–0	2–2		3–2		2–0			1–0	2–1		2–0	1–1		
Valledupar	0–0		0–0				1–0	1–1	2–2	3–0				2–2	0–1		1–1	

Updated to match(es) played on May 27, 2013. Source:
Legend: Blue = home team win; Yellow = draw; Red = away team win.

=== Semifinals ===
The Semifinal stage began on June 2 and ended on June 23. The eight teams that advanced were sorted into two groups of four teams. The winner of each group advanced to the finals.

==== Group A ====
Pos	Team	Pld	W	D	L	GF	GA	GD	Pts	Qualification	MAG	RIO	AME	LLA
1	Unión Magdalena	6	4	0	2	10	7	+3	12	Advanced to the Finals		3–1	3–1	1–0
2	Rionegro	6	2	2	2	7	11	−4	8		1–0		2–2	3–2
3	América	6	2	1	3	11	9	+2	7		4–1	4–0		0–2
4	Llaneros	6	2	1	3	5	6	−1	7		0–2	0–0	1–0	

Rules for classification: 1st points; 2nd first stage position.

==== Group B ====
Pos	Team	Pld	W	D	L	GF	GA	GD	Pts	Qualification	UAU	COR	VAL	BOG
1	Uniautónoma	6	3	2	1	15	9	+6	11	Advanced to the Finals		2–2	6–2	2–0
2	Cortuluá	6	3	2	1	10	6	+4	11		0–2		3–0	2–0
3	Valledupar	6	2	2	2	8	11	−3	8		3–2	1–1		2–0
4	Bogotá	6	0	2	4	3	10	−7	2		2–2	1–2	0–0	

Rules for classification: 1st points; 2nd first stage position.

=== Finals ===
Pos	Team	Pld	W	D	L	GF	GA	GD	Pts	Qualification
1	Uniautónoma	2	1	0	1	3	3	0	3	Advance to Final of the year
2	Unión Magdalena	2	1	0	1	3	3	0	3	

June 26, 2013
15:15

Unión Magdalena	2–1	Uniautónoma
Villarreal 48' (pen.); Parra 86'	Report	Roa 50'

Estadio Federico Serrano Soto, Riohacha
Referee: Gustavo Murillo

July 1, 2013
19:45

Uniautónoma	2–1	Unión Magdalena
Méndez 30'; Rivera 44'	Report	Villarreal 70' (pen.)
Penalties
Rivera (penalty scored); Méndez (penalty missed); Navarro (penalty scored); Machacón (penalty scored)	3–1	(penalty missed) Villarreal; (penalty scored) Carrillo; (penalty missed) Amador; (penalty missed) Quiñónes

Estadio Metropolitano Roberto Meléndez, Barranquilla
Referee: Harold Perilla

Torneo Postobón
2013 Apertura champion

1st title

=== Top goalscorers ===
Rank	Player	Nationality	Club	Goals
1	Martín Arzuaga	Colombian	Uniautónoma	22
2	Isaac Arias	Colombian	Valledupar	20
3	Óscar Villareal	Colombian	Unión Magdalena	13
4	Andrés Javier Mosquera	Colombian	Bogotá	9

== Torneo Finalización ==
=== First stage ===
==== Standings ====
Pos	Team	Pld	W	D	L	GF	GA	GD	Pts	Qualification
1	América	18	9	6	3	21	9	+12	33	Advance to the Semifinals
2	Rionegro	18	9	5	4	27	23	+4	32	Advance to the Semifinals
3	Real Cartagena	18	9	4	5	40	29	+11	31	Advance to the Semifinals
4	Cortuluá	18	7	8	3	26	20	+6	29	Advance to the Semifinals
5	Atlético Bucaramanga	18	8	4	6	19	15	+4	28	Advance to the Semifinals
6	Fortaleza	18	7	7	4	22	19	+3	28	Advance to the Semifinals
7	Uniautónoma	18	7	6	5	24	25	−1	27	Advance to the Semifinals
8	Jaguares	18	7	5	6	18	19	−1	26	Advance to the Semifinals
9	Deportivo Pereira	18	5	9	4	20	18	+2	24	
10	Valledupar	18	6	4	8	22	20	+2	22	
11	Llaneros	18	6	4	8	17	19	−2	22	
12	Depor	18	5	6	7	26	26	0	21	
13	Real Santander	18	5	6	7	22	27	−5	21	
14	Bogotá	18	6	3	9	15	20	−5	21	
15	Unión Magdalena	18	5	4	9	19	24	−5	19	
16	Expreso Rojo	18	4	6	8	16	24	−8	18	
17	Universitario de Popayán	18	4	6	8	21	34	−13	18	
18	Barranquilla	18	4	5	9	24	28	−4	17	

Rules for classification: 1st points; 2nd goal difference; 3rd goals scored; 4th away goals scored; 5th away goals against; 6th draw.

==== Results ====
Home \ Away	AME	BAR	BUC	BOG	COR	DEP	PER	EXP	FOR	JAG	LLA	RCA	RSA	RIO	MAG	UPO	UAU	VAL
América			1–0	3–0	0–1	2–0					2–0		1–1		2–0	1–0		1–0
Barranquilla	2–3						2–0	2–1	0–0	2–3		1–2		2–2		4–1	2–2	
Atlético Bucaramanga		2–1		2–1	0–1	2–1					0–0		3–0		0–1	1–0		1–0
Bogotá		1–0			1–1		0–1		1–0	3–0	0–2	2–2		0–1			0–2	
Cortuluá		0–0					2–2	3–0	1–1	1–0		3–3		1–0		1–2	0–0	
Depor	1–1	3–0		1–3	1–0		1–1		2–2			3–2	2–2		2–1			
Deportivo Pereira	0–0		1–1					3–1	3–0	1–2				2–1		1–2	0–0	1–1
Expreso Rojo	0–0		0–0	0–1		1–1			1–1		1–0		2–0		1–1			1–0
Fortaleza	1–1		1–1					2–1		0–0	3–0			2–4		1–0	3–1	2–1
Jaguares	0–0		2–1			1–0		1–2			0–1	2–2	1–0	1–1				0–1
Llaneros		2–1		2–0	1–2	2–0	1–1					0–1	0–0		1–1	4–3		
Real Cartagena	1–0		1–2				1–2	3–2	2–0	2–3				5–1		5–1	2–3	
Real Santander		2–1	2–1	0–1	2–1		3–1		0–1			2–2			1–2		2–4	
Rionegro	2–1		0–1			2–1	0–0	1–0			2–1		2–2		4–2			2–1
Unión Magdalena		1–2		1–0	2–3		0–0		0–2	1–1		1–2					4–1	1–0
Universitario de Popayán				1–0	3–3	2–2		1–1		0–1			1–1	1–1	1–0		1–1	
Uniautónoma	0–2	1–1	2–1			0–4		4–1		1–0	1–0			0–1				1–1
Valledupar		2–1		1–1	2–2	2–1					1–0	1–2	1–2		1–0	6–1		

Updated to match(es) played on October 19, 2013. Source:
Legend: Blue = home team win; Yellow = draw; Red = away team win.

=== Semifinals ===
The Semifinal stage began on October 26 and ended on November 18. The eight teams that advanced were sorted into two groups of four teams. The winner of each group advanced to the finals.

==== Group A ====
Pos	Team	Pld	W	D	L	GF	GA	GD	Pts	Qualification	FOR	AME	UAU	RCA
1	Fortaleza	6	3	1	2	4	2	+2	10	Advanced to the Finals		2–0	0–1	1–0
2	América	6	2	2	2	9	10	−1	8		0–0		2–1	3–2
3	Uniautónoma	6	2	2	2	9	10	−1	8		1–0	2–2		1–3
4	Real Cartagena	6	2	1	3	11	11	0	7		0–1	3–2	3–3	

Rules for classification: 1st points; 2nd first stage position.

==== Group B ====
Pos	Team	Pld	W	D	L	GF	GA	GD	Pts	Qualification	RIO	JAG	COR	BUC
1	Rionegro	6	3	2	1	11	8	+3	11	Advanced to the Finals		3–0	2–2	2–1
2	Jaguares	6	2	2	2	9	7	+2	8		3–0		1–1	3–0
3	Cortuluá	6	1	4	1	10	9	+1	7		2–2	1–1		4–0
4	Atlético Bucaramanga	6	2	0	4	6	12	−6	6		0–2	2–1	3–0	

Rules for classification: 1st points; 2nd first stage position.

=== Finals ===
Pos	Team	Pld	W	D	L	GF	GA	GD	Pts	Qualification
1	Fortaleza	2	0	2	0	0	0	0	2	Advance to Final of the year
2	Rionegro	2	0	2	0	0	0	0	2	

November 22, 2013
20:10

Fortaleza	0–0	Rionegro
	Report

Estadio Metropolitano de Techo, Bogotá
Referee: Gustavo Murillo

November 27, 2013
18:00

Rionegro	0–0	Fortaleza
	Report
Penalties
Jonathan Palacios (penalty missed); Londoño (penalty scored); García (penalty missed); Cataño (penalty missed)	1–3	(penalty missed) Jaramillo; (penalty scored) Guazá; (penalty scored) Prisco; (penalty scored) Jeisson Palacios

Estadio Alberto Grisales, Rionegro
Referee: Ervin Otero

Torneo Postobón
2013 Finalización champion

1st title

=== Top goalscorers ===
Rank	Player	Nationality	Club	Goals
1	Jhony Cano	Colombian	Real Cartagena	13
2	Jonathan Palacios	Colombian	Rionegro	12
3	Jaime Sierra	Colombian	Deportivo Pereira	11
4	Óscar Villarreal	Colombian	Unión Magdalena	9

== Final of the year ==
Pos	Team	Pld	W	D	L	GF	GA	GD	Pts	Promotion
1	Uniautónoma	2	1	1	0	3	1	+2	4	Promotion to Categoría Primera A
2	Fortaleza	2	0	1	1	1	3	−2	1	

November 30, 2013
15:30

Fortaleza	0–2	Uniautónoma
	Report	Navarro 29'; Arango 89'

Estadio Metropolitano de Techo, Bogotá
Referee: Luis Trujillo

December 3, 2013
19:30

Uniautónoma	1–1	Fortaleza
Navarro 41'	Report	Guazá 71'

Estadio Metropolitano Roberto Meléndez, Barranquilla
Referee: Nicolás Gallo

Torneo Postobón
2013 champion

1st title

== Promotion/relegation playoff ==
As the second worst team in the relegation table, Cúcuta Deportivo had to play a two-legged tie against Fortaleza, the 2013 Categoría Primera B runner-up. As the Primera A team, Cúcuta played the second leg at home. Fortaleza won the tie and as a result were promoted to the Primera A for the 2014 season, while Cúcuta Deportivo were relegated to the Primera B.

Pos	Team	Pld	W	D	L	GF	GA	GD	Pts	Promotion
1	Fortaleza	2	1	0	1	2	1	+1	3	Promoted to the Categoría Primera A
2	Cúcuta Deportivo	2	1	0	1	1	2	−1	3	

December 7, 2013
15:15

Fortaleza	2–0	Cúcuta Deportivo
Guazá 21'; Muñoz 84'	Report

Estadio Metropolitano de Techo, Bogotá
Referee: Adrián Vélez
December 11, 2013
18:00

Cúcuta Deportivo	1–0	Fortaleza
Duarte 3'	Report

Estadio General Santander, Cúcuta
Referee: Wilman Roldán

== Aggregate table ==
Pos	Team	Pld	W	D	L	GF	GA	GD	Pts	Promotion or qualification
1	América	48	25	12	11	72	36	+36	87	
2	Uniautónoma (C, P)	52	23	16	13	89	68	+21	85	Promotion to 2014 Categoría Primera A
3	Rionegro	50	23	13	14	76	70	+6	82	
4	Cortuluá	48	19	19	10	71	58	+13	76	
5	Unión Magdalena	44	19	6	19	54	54	0	63	
6	Real Cartagena	42	18	8	16	75	60	+15	62	
7	Atlético Bucaramanga	42	17	9	16	48	49	−1	60	
8	Fortaleza (P)	46	15	15	16	44	49	−5	60	Promotion/relegation playoff (Note: Fortaleza qualified as the season's runner-up.)
9	Llaneros	42	16	11	15	42	42	0	59	
10	Jaguares	42	16	11	15	48	50	−2	59	
11	Valledupar	42	15	13	14	59	45	+14	58	
12	Bogotá	42	15	8	19	50	53	−3	53	
13	Depor	36	14	7	15	46	49	−3	49	
14	Deportivo Pereira	36	12	11	13	49	46	+3	47	
15	Expreso Rojo	36	10	10	16	36	49	−13	40	
16	Real Santander	36	10	9	17	44	62	−18	39	
17	Barranquilla	36	8	6	22	38	64	−26	30	
18	Universitario de Popayán	36	6	10	20	38	75	−37	28	

Rules for classification: 1) points; 2) goal difference; 3) number of goals scored.
(C) Champions; (P) Promoted
