= 2012 Copa Colombia =

Copa Postobón 2012

Tournament details
- Country: Colombia
- Teams: 36

Final positions
- Champions: Atlético Nacional (1st title)
- Runners-up: Deportivo Pasto
- 2013 Copa Sudamericana: Atlético Nacional

Tournament statistics
- Top goal scorer(s): Andrés Javier Mosquera (9 goals)

The 2012 Copa Colombia, officially the 2012 Copa Postobón for sponsorship reasons, was the 10th edition of the Copa Colombia, the national cup competition for clubs of DIMAYOR. It began on February 14 and ended on November 7. The tournament comprised a total of 36 teams. The winner earned a berth to the 2013 Copa Sudamericana.

== Group phase ==
The 36 teams are divided into six groups based on each separate region of Colombia. The group winners and runners-up advance to the Round of 16, along with the four best third-placed teams. The matches were played from February 14 to June 21.

Teams advance to knockout phase

=== Group A ===
Comprises teams from the Caribbean and Atlantic regions.

Team	Pld	W	D	L	GF	GA	GD	Pts
Uniautónoma	10	5	4	1	18	12	+6	19
Valledupar	10	5	3	2	16	8	+8	18
Junior	10	5	2	3	20	11	+9	17
Real Cartagena	10	3	4	3	12	16	−4	13
Barranquilla	10	3	3	4	14	17	−3	12
Unión Magdalena	10	0	2	8	7	23	−16	2

	BAR	JUN	RCA	UAU	UMA	VAL
Barranquilla	–	0–2	3–3	1–2	3–1	1–1
Junior	4–1	–	0–1	4–1	4–2	0–3
Real Cartagena	1–2	0–5	–	0–2	2–0	0–0
Uniautónoma	1–1	0–0	3–3	–	2–0	1–1
Unión Magdalena	0–1	1–1	0–0	2–4	–	1–4
Valledupar	2–1	2–0	1–2	0–2	2–0	–

=== Group B ===
Comprises teams from the Paisa region and Sucre.

Team	Pld	W	D	L	GF	GA	GD	Pts
Atlético Nacional	10	5	4	1	17	11	+6	19
Itagüí Ditaires	10	4	4	2	15	13	+2	16
Independiente Medellín	10	4	2	4	18	14	+4	14
Sucre	10	3	4	3	8	10	−2	13
Deportivo Rionegro	10	2	3	5	7	10	−3	9
Envigado	10	1	5	4	11	18	−7	8

	NAC	RIO	ENV	MED	ITA	SUC
Atlético Nacional	–	2–0	2–1	2–1	4–1	1–1
D. Rionegro	2–0	–	0–0	2–0	1–2	0–0
Envigado	1–1	2–2	–	2–5	1–1	1–0
Indepen. Medellín	1–2	1–0	2–2	–	1–1	3–0
Itagüí Ditaires	1–1	2–0	3–1	3–2	–	1–1
Sucre	2–2	1–0	2–0	0–2	1–0	–

=== Group C ===
Comprises teams from the Santander and Boyacá regions.

Team	Pld	W	D	L	GF	GA	GD	Pts
Boyacá Chicó	10	6	1	3	19	14	+5	19
Cúcuta Deportivo	10	4	4	2	14	11	+3	16
Atlético Bucaramanga	10	4	3	3	10	11	−1	15
Patriotas	10	4	2	4	17	12	+5	14
Alianza Petrolera	10	3	4	3	13	13	0	13
Real Santander	10	1	2	7	7	19	−12	5

	ALP	BUC	BOY	CUC	PAT	RSA
Alianza Petrolera	–	1–1	3–3	1–0	3–2	2–0
Atl. Bucaramanga	2–1	–	0–1	1–1	2–1	1–0
Boyacá Chicó	2–1	2–0	–	3–1	0–2	3–0
Cúcuta Deportivo	0–0	2–0	4–2	–	1–0	2–1
Patriotas	2–0	1–1	3–2	1–1	–	5–0
Real Santander	1–1	1–2	0–1	2–2	2–0	–

=== Group D ===
Comprises teams from the capital district of Bogotá and Soacha.

Team	Pld	W	D	L	GF	GA	GD	Pts
La Equidad	10	5	4	1	14	9	+5	19
Bogotá	10	4	4	2	19	12	+7	16
Santa Fe	10	5	1	4	17	12	+5	16
Academia	10	3	4	3	14	15	−1	13
Millonarios	10	2	5	3	11	15	−4	11
Expreso Rojo	10	1	2	7	6	18	−12	5

	ACA	BOG	EXR	EQU	MIL	SAF
Academia	–	2–2	3–1	0–0	5–2	0–3
Bogotá	1–1	–	3–0	2–2	2–0	2–3
Expreso Rojo	1–2	0–2	–	0–2	0–0	0–2
La Equidad	2–0	2–2	2–1	–	2–1	2–1
Millonarios	1–1	2–1	1–1	0–0	–	1–1
Santa Fe	2–0	0–2	1–2	2–0	2–3	–

=== Group E ===
Comprises teams from the Pacific region.

Team	Pld	W	D	L	GF	GA	GD	Pts
América	10	6	4	0	16	7	+9	22
Deportivo Pasto	10	5	4	1	19	9	+10	19
Deportivo Cali	10	4	3	3	9	8	+1	15
Cortuluá	10	2	4	4	11	16	−5	10
Depor	10	2	3	5	11	19	−8	9
Universitario de Popayán	10	1	2	7	9	16	−7	5

	AME	COR	DEP	CAL	PAS	UPO
América	–	1–0	3–3	1–0	3–0	2–0
Cortuluá	0–0	–	2–1	0–1	1–1	3–2
Depor	0–1	2–2	–	1–1	0–4	1–0
Deportivo Cali	0–0	2–1	1–2	–	1–1	2–1
Deportivo Pasto	2–2	5–1	3–0	1–0	–	0–0
U. Popayán	2–3	1–1	2–1	0–1	1–2	–

=== Group F ===
Comprises teams in the Coffee Zone, Great Tolima, and Zipaquirá town.

Team	Pld	W	D	L	GF	GA	GD	Pts
Deportes Tolima	10	5	3	2	19	9	+10	18
Once Caldas	10	4	2	4	14	14	0	14
Deportes Quindío	10	4	2	4	14	16	−2	14
Fortaleza	10	4	1	5	19	19	0	13
Atlético Huila	10	3	4	3	14	15	−1	13
Deportivo Pereira	10	3	2	5	11	18	−7	11

	HUI	QUI	TOL	PER	FOR	OCA
Atlético Huila	–	2–1	2–2	3–0	3–1	0–0
Deportes Quindío	1–1	–	1–0	0–0	1–4	1–0
Deportes Tolima	1–1	3–4	–	2–0	2–0	3–0
Deportivo Pereira	3–1	2–1	0–3	–	2–2	2–1
Fortaleza	2–0	2–3	1–3	2–1	–	3–1
Once Caldas	4–1	2–1	0–0	3–1	3–2	–

=== Ranking of third-placed teams ===
Group	Team	Pld	W	D	L	GF	GA	GD	Pts
A	Junior	10	5	2	3	20	11	+9	17
D	Santa Fe	10	5	1	4	17	12	+5	16
E	Deportivo Cali	10	4	3	3	9	8	+1	15
C	Atlético Bucaramanga	10	4	3	3	10	11	−1	15
B	Independiente Medellín	10	4	2	4	18	14	+4	14
F	Deportes Quindío	10	4	2	4	14	16	−2	14

== Knockout phase ==
All ties in the knockout phase are played in two-legged format. In case of a tie in points and goal difference (i.e., aggregate score), neither the away goals rule nor extra time is applied, and the tie is decided by a penalty shoot-out.

=== Bracket ===
Teams playing the second leg at home marked by †. This is determined by which team have the better overall record up to the stage they meet each other, except in the round of 16 where the group winners automatically play the second leg at home.

Round of 16
Atlético Nacional †	2	3	5
Santa Fe	2	0	2
Deportes Tolima †	1	4	5(4)
Itagüí Ditaires	4	1	5(3)
Boyacá Chicó †	1	2	3
Deportivo Cali	1	0	1
Cúcuta Deportivo	2	0	2 (4)
Bogotá †	1	1	2 (3)
Uniautónoma †	2	1	3 (2)
Atlético Bucaramanga	2	1	3 (4)
América †	3	2	5
Valledupar	2	0	2
La Equidad †	0	1	1
Junior	0	2	2
Deportivo Pasto †	1	4	5
Once Caldas	0	0	0

Quarterfinals
Atlético Nacional †	2	2	4
Deportes Tolima	1	1	2
Boyacá Chicó †	1	3	4 (5)
Cúcuta Deportivo	3	1	4 (3)
Atlético Bucaramanga	1	1	2
América †	0	1	1
Junior	2	0	2
Deportivo Pasto †	3	3	6

Semifinals
Atlético Nacional †	1	1	2
Boyacá Chicó	0	0	0
Atlético Bucaramanga	1	0	0
Deportivo Pasto †	0	3	3

Final
Atlético Nacional †	0	2	2
Deportivo Pasto	0	0	0

=== Round of 16 ===
First legs: August 8, 9, 15; Second legs: August 22 and 23.

Teams					Scores		Tie-breakers	
Key	1st leg away team	Points		2nd leg away team	1st leg	2nd leg	GF	Pen.
1	Uniautónoma	2	2	Atlético Bucaramanga	2–2	1–1	3–3	2–4
2	Atlético Nacional	4	1	Santa Fe	2–2	3–0	—	—
3	Boyacá Chicó	4	1	Deportivo Cali	1–1	2–0	—	—
4	La Equidad	1	4	Junior	0–0	1–2	—	—
5	América	6	0	Valledupar	3–2	2–0	—	—
6	Deportes Tolima	3	3	Itagüí Ditaires	1–4	4–1	5–5	4–3
7	Bogotá	3	3	Cúcuta Deportivo	1–2	1–0	2–2	3–4
8	Deportivo Pasto	6	0	Once Caldas	1–0	4–0	—	—

=== Quarterfinals ===
First legs: September 5, 6 and 12; Second legs: September 12 and 19.

Teams					Scores		Tie-breakers	
Key	1st leg away team	Points		2nd leg away team	1st leg	2nd leg	GF	Pen.
S1	Atlético Nacional	6	0	Deportes Tolima	2–1	2–1	—	—
S2	América	1	4	Atlético Bucaramanga	0–1	1–1	—	—
S3	Boyacá Chicó	3	3	Cúcuta Deportivo	1–3	3–1	4–4	5–3
S4	Deportivo Pasto	6	0	Junior	3–2	3–0	—	—

=== Semifinals ===
First legs: October 17; Second legs: October 24.

Teams					Scores		Tie-breakers	
Key	1st leg away team	Points		2nd leg away team	1st leg	2nd leg	GF	Pen.
F1	Deportivo Pasto	3	3	Atlético Bucaramanga	0–1	3–0	3–1	—
F2	Atlético Nacional	6	0	Boyacá Chicó	1–0	1–0	—	—

=== Final ===
First leg: October 31; Second leg: November 7.

Teams				Scores		Tie-breakers	
1st leg away team	Points		2nd leg away team	1st leg	2nd leg	GF	Pen.
Atlético Nacional	4	1	Deportivo Pasto	0–0	2–0	—	—

== Top goalscorers ==
Rank	Name	Club	Goals
1	(Colombia) Andrés Javier Mosquera	Bogotá	9
2	(Colombia) Oscar Iván Méndez	Deportivo Pasto	8
3	(Colombia) Jefferson Duque	Atlético Nacional	6
3	(Colombia) Jeysen Núñez	Boyacá Chicó	6
3	(Colombia) Paulo César Arango	América	6
3	(Colombia) Robinson Aponzá	Atlético Bucaramanga	6
7	(Colombia) Francisco Delgado	Bogotá	5
7	(Colombia) Edwin Cardona	Santa Fe	5
7	(Colombia) José Largacha	Atlético Bucaramanga	5
7	(Colombia) Juan Gilberto Núñez	Junior	5
7	(Colombia) Wilmer Parra	Deportivo Pasto	5
