= 2022 Torneo DIMAYOR =

Torneo BetPlay Dimayor
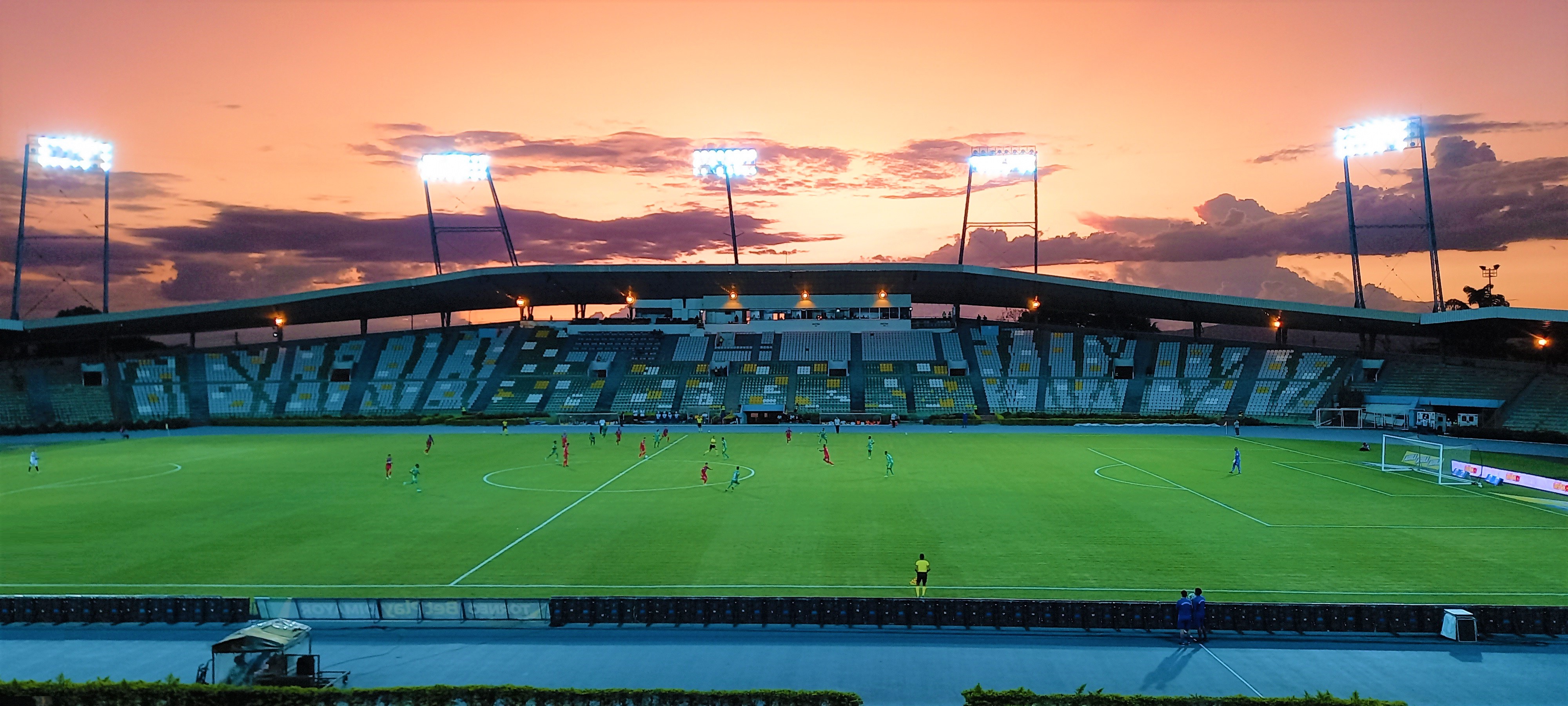
- Match between Deportes Quindío and Tigres.
- Season: 2022
- Dates: 22 January – 29 November 2022
- Champions: Boyacá Chicó (3rd title)
- Promoted: Boyacá Chicó; Atlético Huila
- Matches: 289
- Goals: 638 (2.21 per match)
- Top goalscorer: Torneo I: Jefferson Rivas (13 goals); Torneo II: Gustavo Britos (15 goals)
- Biggest home win: Atlético Huila 6–0 Atlético (8 October)
- Biggest away win: Real Santander 0–4 Leones (21 March); Real Cartagena 0–4 Llaneros (10 May); Orsomarso 0–4 Dep. Quindío (11 July); Orsomarso 0–4 Fortaleza (30 September)
- Highest scoring: Fortaleza 6–2 Orsomarso (7 March)

The 2022 Categoría Primera B season (officially known as the 2022 Torneo BetPlay Dimayor season for sponsorship reasons) was the 33rd season of the Categoría Primera B since its founding as Colombia's second division football league. The season began on 22 January and ended on 29 November 2022.

Boyacá Chicó were the champions, winning their third Primera B title as well as promotion to the top flight by defeating Atlético Huila by a 3–0 score on aggregate in the season's Grand Final. Atlético Huila claimed the other promotion berth, defeating Deportes Quindío in the promotion play-off by a 2–1 aggregate score.

== Format ==
The format for the 2022 Primera B season was approved at DIMAYOR's General Assembly session of 17 December 2021.

For this season, and similar to the previous one, two tournaments (Torneo I and Torneo II) with three stages each were played. In the first stage of both tournaments, the 15 teams (16 teams in Torneo II) played a single round-robin tournament with each team having a bye round and home-and-away order reversed for the Torneo II. The top eight teams at the end of the fifteen rounds advanced to the semi-finals, where teams were drawn into two groups of four where they played each one of their rivals twice. The top team of each group advanced to the finals, playing a double-legged series with the winners advancing to the Grand Final.

The Grand Final to decide the season champions as well as the first promotion to Primera A, was a double-legged series contested at the end of the season by the winners of the season's two tournaments. The second promotion spot to Primera A for the 2023 season was decided in a promotion play-off between the Grand Final loser and the best-placed team of the season's aggregate table, other than the Grand Final winners.

== Teams ==
Originally, 15 teams took part in the season. Cortuluá and Unión Magdalena, who won the semifinal groups of the 2021–II Primera B tournament, were promoted to Primera A for the 2022 season and were replaced in Primera B by Atlético Huila and Deportes Quindío, who were relegated at the end of the 2021 Primera A Finalización tournament.

On 20 April 2022 the General Assembly of DIMAYOR approved the reaffiliation of Cúcuta Deportivo, which had been expelled from the entity on 25 November 2020 due to legal issues. Despite being in the top tier at the moment of its disaffiliation, it was decided that Cúcuta Deportivo would enter the Primera B competition starting from the second half of the 2022 season, with which the tournament expanded to 16 teams.

Locations of the 2022 Categoría Primera B teams

Club	City	Stadium	Capacity
Atlético	Cali	Pascual Guerrero	33,130
Atlético Huila	Neiva	Guillermo Plazas Alcid	22,000
Barranquilla	Barranquilla	Romelio Martínez	8,000
Boca Juniors de Cali	Cali	Pascual Guerrero	33,130
Bogotá	Bogotá	Metropolitano de Techo	8,000
Boyacá Chicó	Tunja	La Independencia	20,630
Deportes Quindío	Armenia	Centenario	20,716
Fortaleza	Bogotá	Metropolitano de Techo	8,000
Leones	Itagüí	Metropolitano Ciudad de Itagüí	12,000
Llaneros	Villavicencio	Bello Horizonte	15,000
Orsomarso	Palmira	Francisco Rivera Escobar	15,300
Real Cartagena	Cartagena	Jaime Morón León	16,068
Real Santander	Piedecuesta	Villa Concha	5,500
Tigres	Bogotá	Metropolitano de Techo	8,000
Valledupar	Valledupar	Armando Maestre Pavajeau	11,000

The following team joined the competition for the Torneo II:

Club	City	Stadium	Capacity
Cúcuta Deportivo	Cúcuta	General Santander	42,901

== Torneo I ==
=== First stage ===
==== Standings ====
Pos	Team	Pld	W	D	L	GF	GA	GD	Pts	Qualification
1	Leones	14	8	3	3	21	10	+11	27	Advance to the semi-finals
2	Fortaleza	14	7	4	3	26	17	+9	25	Advance to the semi-finals
3	Deportes Quindío	14	6	7	1	17	8	+9	25	Advance to the semi-finals
4	Real Cartagena	14	7	4	3	19	16	+3	25	Advance to the semi-finals
5	Tigres	14	6	4	4	16	12	+4	22	Advance to the semi-finals
6	Boyacá Chicó	14	6	4	4	18	16	+2	22	Advance to the semi-finals
7	Llaneros	14	6	4	4	14	12	+2	22	Advance to the semi-finals
8	Bogotá	14	6	4	4	17	16	+1	22	Advance to the semi-finals
9	Valledupar	14	5	6	3	15	12	+3	21	
10	Orsomarso	14	5	3	6	14	20	−6	18	
11	Atlético	14	3	5	6	10	14	−4	14	
12	Real Santander	14	2	5	7	13	21	−8	11	
13	Barranquilla	14	2	4	8	13	23	−10	10	
14	Atlético Huila	14	1	6	7	7	14	−7	9	
15	Boca Juniors de Cali	14	1	5	8	10	19	−9	8	

Source: Dimayor, Soccerway
Rules for classification: 1) Points, 2) Goal difference, 3) Goals for, 4) Away goals for, 5) Away goals against, 6) Drawing of lots.

==== Results ====
Home \ Away	ATL	HUI	BAR	BOC	BOG	BOY	QUI	FOR	LEO	LLA	ORS	RCA	RSA	TIG	VAL
Atlético	—	1–0	—	1–0	3–1	0–2	—	2–2	—	1–3	—	—	0–1	—	0–0
Atlético Huila	—	—	0–0	2–0	—	—	0–0	—	1–1	—	0–1	—	1–1	0–0	—
Barranquilla	1–0	—	—	—	2–4	2–2	—	0–1	—	1–2	—	0–2	—	—	1–1
Boca Juniors de Cali	—	—	0–0	—	1–1	1–1	—	—	—	1–1	—	1–2	—	2–0	—
Bogotá	—	2–0	—	—	—	0–0	—	0–1	1–0	0–1	—	—	2–1	—	2–1
Boyacá Chicó	—	1–0	—	—	—	—	2–3	0–1	1–0	—	2–1	—	2–1	—	2–2
Deportes Quindío	1–0	—	2–1	1–0	1–2	—	—	—	—	0–0	—	5–0	—	0–0	—
Fortaleza	—	3–1	—	3–1	—	—	2–2	—	1–2	—	6–2	—	2–3	1–2	—
Leones	1–1	—	3–1	2–1	—	—	0–0	—	—	—	3–1	1–0	—	3–1	—
Llaneros	—	2–1	—	—	—	1–2	—	0–1	1–0	—	0–1	—	2–2	—	0–0
Orsomarso	1–0	—	2–1	2–0	1–1	—	1–1	—	—	—	—	1–2	—	0–2	—
Real Cartagena	0–0	1–1	—	—	1–1	3–1	—	1–1	—	2–0	—	—	—	—	1–2
Real Santander	—	—	2–3	1–1	—	—	0–1	—	0–4	—	0–0	1–2	—	0–0	—
Tigres	1–1	—	2–0	—	3–0	1–0	—	—	—	0–1	—	1–2	—	—	3–2
Valledupar	—	1–0	—	2–1	—	—	0–0	1–1	0–1	—	2–0	—	1–0	—	—

Source: Dimayor, Soccerway
Legend: Blue = home team win; Yellow = draw; Red = away team win.

=== Semi-finals ===
The eight teams that advanced to the semi-finals were drawn into two groups of four teams, with the top two teams from the first stage being seeded in each group. The two group winners advanced to the finals.

==== Group A ====
Pos	Team	Pld	W	D	L	GF	GA	GD	Pts	Qualification	BOY	LEO	LLA	RCA
1	Boyacá Chicó	6	2	3	1	7	4	+3	9	Advance to the Finals	—	1–1	2–1	3–0
2	Leones	6	1	5	0	6	5	+1	8		0–0	—	1–1	0–0
3	Llaneros	6	1	4	1	9	6	+3	7		0–0	3–3	—	0–0
4	Real Cartagena	6	1	2	3	2	9	−7	5		2–1	0–1	0–4	—

Source: Dimayor, Soccerway
Legend: Blue = home team win; Yellow = draw; Red = away team win.
Rules for classification: 1) Points, 2) First stage position.

==== Group B ====
Pos	Team	Pld	W	D	L	GF	GA	GD	Pts	Qualification	QUI	FOR	BOG	TIG
1	Deportes Quindío	6	3	3	0	7	4	+3	12	Advance to the Finals	—	1–1	2–1	1–0
2	Fortaleza	6	2	3	1	6	4	+2	9		1–1	—	0–1	2–1
3	Bogotá	6	2	1	3	5	7	−2	7		1–1	0–2	—	2–1
4	Tigres	6	1	1	4	3	6	−3	4		0–1	0–0	1–0	—

Source: Dimayor, Soccerway
Legend: Blue = home team win; Yellow = draw; Red = away team win.
Rules for classification: 1) Points, 2) First stage position.

=== Finals ===
12 June 2022
19:40 UTC−5

Boyacá Chicó	0–0	Deportes Quindío
	Report

Estadio La Independencia, Tunja
Referee: Edilson Ariza

17 June 2022
19:00 UTC−5

Deportes Quindío	2–2	Boyacá Chicó
Castillo 34' (pen.); L. Mina 83'	Report	Cruz 79'; Támara 90'
Penalties
Borrero (penalty scored); L. Mina (penalty scored); H. Balanta (penalty missed); Hinestroza (penalty missed)	2–4	(penalty scored) Lozano; (penalty scored) G. Balanta; (penalty scored) Pimentel; (penalty scored) Támara

Estadio Centenario, Armenia
Referee: Nolberto Ararat

Tied 2–2 on aggregate, Boyacá Chicó won on penalties.

Torneo BetPlay DIMAYOR
2022–I winners

=== Top scorers ===
Rank	Name	Club	Goals
1	(Colombia) Jefferson Rivas	Leones	13
2	(Colombia) Johar Mejía	Bogotá	9
3	(Colombia) Kevin Aladesanmi	Fortaleza	7
3	(Colombia) Luis Fabián Mina	Deportes Quindío	7
5	(Colombia) Mario Álvarez	Llaneros	6
5	(Colombia) Diego Echeverri	Llaneros	6
5	(Colombia) Breidy Golúz	Orsomarso	6
5	(Colombia) Adrián Parra	Fortaleza	6
5	(Venezuela) Henry Plazas	Boyacá Chicó	6
10	(Colombia) Wilmar Cruz	Boyacá Chicó	5
10	(Colombia) Wilson España	Real Cartagena	5
10	(Colombia) Misael Martínez	Valledupar	5

Source: Soccerway

== Torneo II ==
=== First stage ===
==== Standings ====
Pos	Team	Pld	W	D	L	GF	GA	GD	Pts	Qualification
1	Fortaleza	16	8	4	4	23	11	+12	28	Advance to the semi-finals
2	Deportes Quindío	16	8	4	4	24	16	+8	28	Advance to the semi-finals
3	Atlético Huila	16	7	4	5	32	22	+10	25	Advance to the semi-finals
4	Barranquilla	16	7	4	5	23	19	+4	25	Advance to the semi-finals
5	Llaneros	16	6	7	3	18	14	+4	25	Advance to the semi-finals
6	Tigres	16	7	4	5	19	19	0	25	Advance to the semi-finals
7	Boyacá Chicó	16	5	9	2	16	10	+6	24	Advance to the semi-finals
8	Real Santander	16	6	6	4	18	15	+3	24	Advance to the semi-finals
9	Bogotá	16	7	2	7	21	20	+1	23	
10	Atlético	16	7	2	7	14	18	−4	23	
11	Cúcuta Deportivo	16	6	4	6	19	18	+1	22	
12	Leones	16	4	9	3	22	21	+1	21	
13	Boca Juniors de Cali	16	4	7	5	17	20	−3	19	
14	Real Cartagena	16	4	4	8	18	26	−8	16	
15	Valledupar	16	1	6	9	15	27	−12	9	
16	Orsomarso	16	1	4	11	7	30	−23	7	

Source: Dimayor, Soccerway
Rules for classification: 1) Points, 2) Goal difference, 3) Goals for, 4) Away goals for, 5) Away goals against, 6) Drawing of lots.

==== Results ====
Home \ Away	ATL	HUI	BAR	BOC	BOG	BOY	CUC	QUI	FOR	LEO	LLA	ORS	RCA	RSA	TIG	VAL
Atlético	—	—	3–2	0–0	—	—	0–1	1–1	—	4–0	—	2–1	0–2	—	1–0	—
Atlético Huila	6–0	—	—	—	2–0	1–1	3–2	—	1–2	—	2–0	—	2–3	—	—	3–2
Barranquilla	—	2–1	—	1–1	—	—	—	1–1	—	3–1	—	2–0	2–3	2–1	3–0	—
Boca Juniors de Cali	0–1	1–1	—	—	—	—	—	1–0	0–0	1–1	—	2–1	—	2–3	—	2–0
Bogotá	0–1	—	1–0	4–1	—	—	2–1	1–2	—	—	—	1–0	2–0	—	0–1	—
Boyacá Chicó	1–0	—	1–0	3–1	0–2	—	—	—	0–0	—	1–1	—	4–0	—	2–2	—
Cúcuta Deportivo	—	—	0–1	1–2	—	1–2	—	—	—	—	0–0	3–0	—	0–0	2–1	2–1
Deportes Quindío	—	1–1	—	—	—	0–0	2–0	—	1–0	3–2	—	2–0	—	2–0	—	4–3
Fortaleza	2–0	—	3–0	—	1–2	1–0	2–2	—	—	—	1–0	—	3–1	—	—	3–1
Leones	—	2–2	—	—	2–2	1–1	1–1	—	1–1	—	0–0	—	—	1–1	—	1–0
Llaneros	1–0	3–2	1–1	1–1	2–0	—	—	1–0	—	—	—	—	2–0	—	2–0	—
Orsomarso	—	0–2	—	—	—	0–0	—	0–4	0–4	1–4	2–2	—	—	0–0	—	1–1
Real Cartagena	—	—	2–2	0–0	—	—	1–2	3–1	—	0–1	—	0–1	—	2–2	0–1	—
Real Santander	0–1	2–1	—	—	2–0	0–0	0–1	—	1–0	—	3–1	—	—	—	—	1–0
Tigres	—	1–2	—	3–2	2–1	—	—	2–0	1–0	1–1	—	1–0	—	2–2	—	—
Valledupar	1–0	—	0–1	—	3–3	0–0	—	—	—	0–3 (Note: Match abandoned after 68 minutes of play and awarded to Leones due to crowd disturbances by Valledupar fans. The score at the time of suspension was 3–3.)	1–1	—	1–1	—	1–1	—

Source: Dimayor, Soccerway
Legend: Blue = home team win; Yellow = draw; Red = away team win.

=== Semi-finals ===
The eight teams that advanced to the semi-finals were drawn into two groups of four teams, with the top two teams from the first stage being seeded in each group. The two group winners advanced to the finals.

==== Group A ====
Pos	Team	Pld	W	D	L	GF	GA	GD	Pts	Qualification	BOY	LLA	FOR	BAR
1	Boyacá Chicó	6	4	1	1	8	1	+7	13	Advance to the Finals	—	3–0	0–0	1–0
2	Llaneros	6	3	2	1	7	6	+1	11		1–0	—	0–0	2–0
3	Fortaleza	6	2	2	2	3	4	−1	8		0–2	1–2	—	1–0
4	Barranquilla	6	0	1	5	2	9	−7	1		0–2	2–2	0–1	—

Source: Dimayor, Soccerway
Legend: Blue = home team win; Yellow = draw; Red = away team win.
Rules for classification: 1) Points, 2) First stage position.

==== Group B ====
Pos	Team	Pld	W	D	L	GF	GA	GD	Pts	Qualification	HUI	QUI	RSA	TIG
1	Atlético Huila	6	4	1	1	6	5	+1	13	Advance to the Finals	—	2–1	1–1	1–0
2	Deportes Quindío	6	4	0	2	10	6	+4	12		3–0	—	1–0	1–0
3	Real Santander	6	1	2	3	4	6	−2	5		0–1	3–2	—	0–0
4	Tigres	6	1	1	4	2	5	−3	4		0–1	1–2	1–0	—

Source: Dimayor, Soccerway
Legend: Blue = home team win; Yellow = draw; Red = away team win.
Rules for classification: 1) Points, 2) First stage position.

=== Finals ===
11 November 2022
20:00 UTC−5

Boyacá Chicó	1–0	Atlético Huila
Támara 85'	Report

Estadio La Independencia, Tunja
Referee: Bismarks Santiago

15 November 2022
20:00 UTC−5

Atlético Huila	1–0	Boyacá Chicó
Amaya 27'	Report
Penalties
Escorcia (penalty scored); Cantillo (penalty scored); Britos (penalty scored); Méndez (penalty scored)	4–2	(penalty missed) Lozano; (penalty scored) Támara; (penalty scored) Arrieta; (penalty missed) Balanta

Estadio Guillermo Plazas Alcid, Neiva
Referee: Carlos Betancur

Tied 1–1 on aggregate, Atlético Huila won on penalties.

Torneo BetPlay DIMAYOR
2022–II winners

=== Top scorers ===
Rank	Name	Club	Goals
1	(Argentina) Gustavo Britos	Atlético Huila	15
2	(Colombia) Andrés Amaya	Atlético Huila	8
3	(Colombia) Jonathan Agudelo	Cúcuta Deportivo	7
3	(Colombia) Diego Echeverri	Llaneros	7
3	(Colombia) Leider Robledo	Real Cartagena	7
6	(Colombia) Kevin Aladesanmi	Fortaleza	6
6	(Colombia) Julián Angulo	Real Santander	6
6	(Colombia) Jesús Arrieta	Boyacá Chicó	6
6	(Colombia) Aldair Zárate	Bogotá	6

Source: Soccerway

== Grand Final ==
The Torneo I and Torneo II winners played a double-legged series to decide the season champions and the first team promoted to the 2023 Categoría Primera A season.

18 November 2022
20:00 UTC−5

Atlético Huila	0–2	Boyacá Chicó
	Report	Cruz 55'; Moreno 77'

Estadio Guillermo Plazas Alcid, Neiva
Referee: Andrés Rojas

21 November 2022
20:00 UTC−5

Boyacá Chicó	1–0	Atlético Huila
Cruz 45'	Report

Estadio La Independencia, Tunja
Referee: John Hinestroza

Boyacá Chicó won 3–0 on aggregate.

Torneo BetPlay DIMAYOR
2022 champions

3rd title

== Aggregate table ==
Pos	Team	Pld	W	D	L	GF	GA	GD	Pts	Qualification
1	Deportes Quindío	44	21	16	7	60	36	+24	79	Advance to the Promotion play-off
2	Boyacá Chicó (C, P)	48	20	19	9	55	34	+21	79	Promotion to Categoría Primera A
3	Fortaleza	42	19	13	10	58	36	+22	70	
4	Llaneros	42	16	17	9	48	38	+10	65	
5	Leones	36	13	17	6	49	36	+13	56	
6	Tigres	42	15	10	17	40	42	−2	55	
7	Bogotá	36	15	7	14	43	43	0	52	
8	Atlético Huila (P)	40	13	11	16	46	45	+1	50	Advance to the Promotion play-off
9	Real Cartagena	36	12	10	14	39	51	−12	46	
10	Real Santander	36	9	13	14	35	42	−7	40	
11	Atlético	30	10	7	13	24	32	−8	37	
12	Barranquilla	36	9	9	18	38	51	−13	36	
13	Valledupar	30	6	12	12	30	39	−9	30	
14	Boca Juniors de Cali	30	5	12	13	27	39	−12	27	
15	Orsomarso	30	6	7	17	21	50	−29	25	
16	Cúcuta Deportivo	16	6	4	6	19	18	+1	22	

Source: Dimayor
Rules for classification: 1) Points, 2) Goal difference, 3) Goals for, 4) Away goals for, 5) Away goals against, 6) Drawing of lots.
(C) Champions; (P) Promoted

== Promotion play-off ==
The best-placed team in the aggregate table, Deportes Quindío, played a double-legged series against the Grand Final losing side Atlético Huila to decide the second and last team promoted to Primera A.

25 November 2022
20:00 UTC−5

Atlético Huila	2–0	Deportes Quindío
Escorcia 32' (pen.); Lozano 90+5'	Report

Estadio Guillermo Plazas Alcid, Neiva
Referee: Éder Vergara

29 November 2022
20:00 UTC−5

Deportes Quindío	1–0	Atlético Huila
Díaz 25'	Report

Estadio Centenario, Armenia
Referee: Bismarks Santiago

Atlético Huila won 2–1 on aggregate and were promoted to Categoría Primera A.

== See also ==
- 2022 Categoría Primera A season
- 2022 Copa Colombia
