= Patarroyo =

Patarroyo is a Spanish surname. Notable people with the surname include:

- Juan Carlos Patarroyo (fl. early 21st century), Colombian engineer
- Manuel Elkin Patarroyo (1946–2025), Colombian Professor of Pathology and Immunology
