= Hubert Bodhert =

Colombian footballer and manager (born 1972)

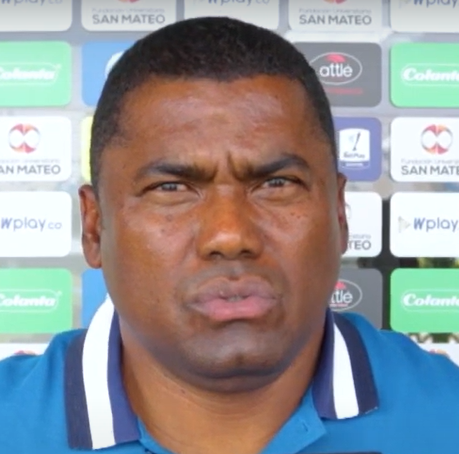
- Bodhert in 2021

Personal information
- Full name: Hubert Antonio Bodhert Barrios
- Date of birth: 17 January 1972 (age 54)
- Place of birth: Cartagena, Colombia
- Position: Defender

Youth career
- Instituto Abolsure

Senior career*
Years	Team	Apps	(Gls)
1992–1995	Real Cartagena		
1995–1997	El Cóndor		

Managerial career
- 1997–2003: Expreso Rojo (youth)
- 2004–2006: Expreso Rojo
- 2006–2007: Real Cartagena (assistant)
- 2006: Real Cartagena (interim)
- 2008–2011: Real Cartagena
- 2014–2015: Llaneros
- 2015–2016: Real Cartagena
- 2016–2017: Jaguares de Córdoba
- 2018–2021: Once Caldas
- 2021: Águilas Doradas
- 2021–2023: Alianza Petrolera
- 2023: Santa Fe
- 2024: Jaguares de Córdoba
- 2024–2026: Alianza
- 2026: Jaguares de Córdoba
- * Club domestic league appearances and goals

Hubert Antonio Bodhert Barrios (born 17 January 1972) is a Colombian football manager and former footballer who played as a defender.

== Playing career ==
Born in Cartagena to a German great grandfather, Bodhert started his career with hometown side Real Cartagena. In 1995, he moved to El Cóndor, and retired two years later at the age of 25.

== Managerial career ==
In the middle of 1997, after six months without a contract, Bodhert joined Expreso Rojo's youth categories. He was named manager of the main squad in 2004 in the place of Víctor González Scott, and remained in the role until 2006, when he moved to former side Real Cartagena as an assistant manager.

In late 2006, after Álvaro de Jesús Gómez left, Bodhert was named interim manager. In December 2007, after the club's relegation from the Categoría Primera A, he was appointed manager.

Bodhert achieved promotion back to the top tier, but left the manager post in October 2011 to become the club's sporting manager. He subsequently moved to Unión Magdalena under the same role in November 2012, before returning to managerial duties with Llaneros for the 2014 campaign.

Bodhert left Llaneros in March 2015, and returned to Real Cartagena in June of that year. He was dismissed from the manager role and appointed youth football director in March 2016, but was named in charge of Jaguares de Córdoba in the following month.

On 5 December 2017, after avoiding relegation, Bodhert announced his departure from Jaguares, and took over Once Caldas two days later. On 1 January 2021, he left the club after his contract expired, and was named at the helm of Águilas Doradas three days later.

Bodhert resigned from Águilas on 2 March 2021, and took over Alianza Petrolera five days later. He left Alianza Petrolera on 21 June 2023, after failing to reach the finals of the 2023 Apertura tournament, and was presented as new manager of Santa Fe four days later. On 8 October, Bodhert left Santa Fe after a 5–0 home defeat to Águilas Doradas.

On 15 November 2023, he was appointed as manager of Jaguares de Córdoba for the 2024 season. He resigned from Jaguares the following 3 April in order to take over as manager of fellow Categoría Primera A club Alianza.

Bodhert remained at the helm of Alianza for the remainder of the year as well as the entirety of the 2025 season, but he was sacked on 17 February 2026 after a poor start to the season, with the club placing bottom after seven matches. On 31 March, he returned to Jaguares de Córdoba for a third stint as manager.

On 28 September 2026, Bodhert was sacked from Jaguares, with the team placing last in both the 2026 Finalización tournament as well as the season's relegation table.
