= Brayan Moreno =

Brayan Moreno may refer to:

- Brayan Moreno (footballer, born 1998)
- Brayan Moreno (footballer, born 1999)
