= Andrés Mosquera =

Andrés Mosquera may refer to:

- Andrés Mosquera (discus thrower), Colombian discus thrower
- Andrés Mosquera (footballer, born 1978), Colombian football defender
- Andrés Mosquera (footballer, born 1989), Colombian football forward
- Andrés Mosquera (footballer, born 1990), Colombian football defender
- Andrés Mosquera (footballer, born 1991), Colombian football goalkeeper
