= Andrés Amaya (footballer) =

Colombian footballer (born 2001)

Personal information
- Full name: Andrés Felipe Amaya Rivera
- Date of birth: 24 April 2001 (age 25)
- Place of birth: Barrancabermeja, Colombia
- Height: 1.70 m (5 ft 7 in)
- Positions: Forward; midfielder

Team information
- Current team: Fortaleza
- Number: 11

Youth career
- Atlético Huila

Senior career*
Years	Team	Apps	(Gls)
2017–2024	Atlético Huila	101	(16)
2020–2021	→ Internacional (loan)	3	(0)
2023	→ Belgrano (loan)	1	(0)
2024–2025	Deportivo Pasto	19	(0)
2025–	Fortaleza	19	(1)

International career^{‡}
2019–2020	Colombia U20	4	(1)
- * Club domestic league appearances and goals as of 11 December 2025 ‡ National team caps and goals as of 16:53, 22 June 2023 (UTC)

Andrés Felipe Amaya Rivera (born 24 April 2001) is a Colombian footballer who currently plays as a midfielder for Colombian club Fortaleza.

== Early life ==
Born in Barrancabermeja, Amaya's family moved to Urabá Antioquia when he was one year old. With Urabá being one of the most dangerous parts of Colombia, Amaya stated that he saw violence "daily".

== Club career ==
Amaya joined the academy of Atlético Huila as a child, and was initially deployed as an attacking midfielder, before being moved into a more defensive role in midfield. He eventually settled as a forward, and went on to make his debut for the club on 8 March 2017, in a 2–1 Copa Colombia win over Deportes Quindío. Following impressive performances for the club, he was named on British newspaper The Guardian's "Next Generation" list for 2018, highlighting the best sixty young players worldwide.

In a Categoría Primera A match against Deportivo Cali on 2 February 2019, Amaya was subject to a number of tough challenges from Deportivo Cali players, with Julián Zea being sent off for a particularly dangerous challenge on Amaya. Following the match, club chairman Juan Carlos Patarroyo spoke publicly about the incidents during the game, requesting that other teams be more careful not to injure a player with as much potential as Amaya.

Having established himself in the first team over the season, he was linked with a move to Portuguese club Porto in early 2020, as well as clubs in the United States. Despite these links, he signed for Brazilian club Internacional in February 2020, on an initial one-year loan deal with a purchase option. The move was confirmed by his agent in March of the same year, with Amaya having already began to train with his new team.

Having spent the first season with Internacional's under-20 side, in a campaign interrupted by the COVID-19 pandemic in Brazil, he went on to make three appearances in the Campeonato Gaúcho the following year, before returning to Huila mid-way through the 2021 season. Huila were relegated to the Categoría Primera B for the 2022 season, which saw them bounce immediately back to the first division, with Amaya contributing ten goals.

Following his performances in helping Huila achieve promotion, he was signed by Argentine side Belgrano in February 2023, on a one-year loan deal with a purchase option.

== International career ==
Amaya has represented Colombia at under-20 level, playing at the 2019 FIFA U-20 World Cup.

== Career statistics ==
=== Club ===
As of 22 June 2023.

Appearances and goals by club, season and competition
Club	Season	League			State League		Cup		Other		Total	
Club	Season	Division	Apps	Goals	Apps	Goals	Apps	Goals	Apps	Goals	Apps	Goals
Atlético Huila	2017	Categoría Primera A	8	2	–		5 (Note: Appearances in the Copa Colombia)	0	0	0	13	2
Atlético Huila	2018	Categoría Primera A	20	1	–		2	1	0	0	22	2
Atlético Huila	2019	Categoría Primera A	21	3	–		0	0	0	0	21	3
Atlético Huila	2020	Categoría Primera A	0	0	–		0	0	0	0	0	0
Atlético Huila	2021	Categoría Primera A	17	0	–		0	0	0	0	17	0
Atlético Huila	2022	Categoría Primera B	35	10	–		3	0	0	0	38	10
Atlético Huila	2023	Categoría Primera A	0	0	–		0	0	0	0	0	0
Atlético Huila	Total		101	16	0	0	10	1	0	0	111	17
Internacional (loan)	2020	Série A	0	0	0	0	0	0	0	0	0	0
Internacional (loan)	2021	Série A	0	0	3 (Note: Appearances in the Campeonato Gaúcho)	0	0	0	0	0	3	0
Internacional (loan)	Total		0	0	3	0	0	0	0	0	3	0
Belgrano (loan)	2023	Argentine Primera División	1	0	–		1 (Note: Appearances in the Copa Argentina)	0	0	0	2	0
Career total			105	16	3	0	11	1	0	0	119	17
