= Edison López =

Colombian footballer (born 1999)

Personal information
- Full name: Edison Alexánder López Gil
- Date of birth: 20 October 1999 (age 27)
- Place of birth: Bello, Colombia
- Height: 1.78 m (5 ft 10 in)
- Position: Midfielder

Team information
- Current team: Envigado
- Number: 21

Youth career
- Envigado

Senior career*
Years	Team	Apps	(Gls)
2018-2026	Envigado	120	(8)
2026-	Real Cartagena		
- * Club domestic league appearances and goals as of 19:27, 6 December 2025 (UTC)

Edison Alexánder López Gil (born 20 October 1999) is a Colombian footballer who plays as a midfielder for Real Cartagena.
