= Luis Zuleta =

Colombian footballer (born 1974)

Personal information
- Date of birth: August 7, 1974 (age 52)
- Place of birth: Santa Marta
- Position: Striker

Senior career*
Years	Team	Apps	(Gls)
1994-2007	Unión Magdalena		
1998	Independiente Medellín		
2001	Atlético Junior		
2003	Independiente Santa Fe		
2004	Deportivo Pasto		
2006	Atlético Huila		
2007-08	Aguila		
2008-09	Carabobo F.C.		

International career
1997	Colombia national football team	4	
- * Club domestic league appearances and goals

Luis Fernando Zuleta Maldonado (born 7 August 1974) is a retired Colombian football striker.

He was born in Santa Marta. He spent the main part of his career in Unión Magdalena from 1994 through 2007, except spells in Independiente Medellín in 1998, Atlético Junior in 2001, Independiente Santa Fe in 2003, Deportivo Pasto in 2004, and Atlético Huila in 2006. He rounded off his career with Salvadoran C.D. Águila in 2007–08 and Venezuelan Carabobo F.C. in 2008–09.

Zuleta became top goalscorer in the 2002 Categoría Primera A apertura season with 13 goals.

He was capped 4 times for Colombia national football team in 1997, including at the 1997 Copa América.
