= Óscar Villarreal (footballer) =

Colombian footballer (born 1981)

Personal information
- Full name: Óscar Eduardo Villarreal
- Date of birth: 27 March 1981 (age 45)
- Place of birth: Cali, Colombia
- Position: Forward

Senior career*
Years	Team	Apps	(Gls)
1999	América de Cali		
2000	Real Cartagena		
2001–2003	América de Cali		
2004	Aucas		
2005	América de Cali		
2006	San Martín de Porres		
2007	Talleres de Córdoba		
2007	Independiente Santa Fe		
2008	Deportivo Pasto		
2009	Cienciano		
2010	Sporting Cristal		
2010	Total Chalaco		
- * Club domestic league appearances and goals

Óscar Eduardo Villarreal (born 27 March 1981 in Cali, Colombia) is a Colombian former professional footballer who played as a forward.

== Clubs ==
- América de Cali 1999
- Real Cartagena 2000
- América de Cali 2001–2003
- Aucas 2004
- América de Cali 2005
- San Martín de Porres 2006
- Talleres de Córdoba 2007
- Independiente Santa Fe 2007
- Deportivo Pasto 2008
- Cienciano 2009
- Sporting Cristal 2010
- Total Chalaco 2010
