= Edgar Zapata =

Colombian footballer (born 1979)

Personal information
- Full name: Edgar Alonso Zapata Pérez
- Date of birth: September 1, 1979 (age 47)
- Place of birth: Medellín, Colombia
- Height: 1.84 m (6 ft 0 in)
- Position: Defender

Youth career
- 2001–2002: Alianza Petrolera

Senior career*
Years	Team	Apps	(Gls)
2003–2005	Atlético Junior	69	(5)
2006	Necaxa	29	(0)
2007	Tiburones de Veracruz	14	(0)
2007–2012	Deportivo Cali	104	(1)
2011	→ Atlético Nacional (loan)	26	(0)
2014–2015	Uniautónoma	4	(0)

International career^{‡}
2007	Colombia	1	(0)
- * Club domestic league appearances and goals as of 24 April 2013 ‡ National team caps and goals as of May 20, 2008

Edgar Alonso Zapata Pérez (born September 1, 1979) is a Colombian football defender.

Zapata has had spells in Mexico and has been capped by the Colombia national football team once.
