= Orlando Niebles =

Colombian footballer (born 1985)

Personal information
- Date of birth: 4 August 1985 (age 41)
- Place of birth: Barranquilla, Colombia
- Position: Defender

Team information
- Current team: Uniautónoma
- Number: 3

Senior career*
Years	Team	Apps	(Gls)
2007–2009	Depor		
2007	→ Atlético Junior (loan)		
2010	Cúcuta Deportivo		
2011–2014	Uniautónoma		
- * Club domestic league appearances and goals

Orlando Niebles (born 4 August 1985 in Barranquilla) is a retired Colombian footballer, who plays for last time for Uniautónoma.

== Career ==
The defender played for Atlético Junior, Depor Aguablanca FC and Cúcuta Deportivo in the Copa Mustang.
