= 2002 Categoría Primera A season =

Copa Mustang
- Season: 2002
- Champions: Apertura: América de Cali (12th title); Finalización: Independiente Medellín (3rd title)
- Relegated: Real Cartagena
- Copa Libertadores: América de Cali; Independiente Medellín; Deportivo Cali
- Copa Sudamericana: Atlético Nacional; Deportivo Pasto
- Matches: 448
- Goals: 1,029 (2.3 per match)
- Top goalscorer: Apertura: Luis Zuleta (13 goals); Finalización: Orlando Ballesteros and Milton Rodríguez (13 goals each)

The 2002 Categoría Primera A season was the 54th season of Colombia's top-flight football league.

== Format ==
Starting from this year, the General Assembly of DIMAYOR approved the expansion of the tournament from 16 to 18 teams, adding to the league two of the three DIMAYOR "A-class" associates who were taking part of the Categoría Primera B at the time through a special promotion tournament. In addition to this, the league started awarding two championships per season, thus making the Apertura and Finalización tournaments independent championships within a single season.

For both the Apertura and Finalización tournaments, the 18 teams were first divided into three groups of six teams, playing five games, and then all teams in the league played each other once for a total of 22 matches. The semifinal round was played by the best eight teams at the end of the 22 matches, who were divided into two groups of four teams each according to their position at the end of the first stage: odd-ranked teams made up Group A, while even-ranked ones made up Group B. The winners of each group played the finals to decide the champions of each tournament.

== Torneo Apertura ==
The Torneo Apertura (officially the 2002 Copa Mustang I for sponsorship reasons) was the first tournament of the season. The tournament began on 3 February and ended on 19 June.

=== First stage ===
==== Standings ====
Pos	Team	Pld	W	D	L	GF	GA	GD	Pts	Qualification
1	Deportivo Cali	22	11	6	5	44	24	+20	39	Advanced to the Semifinals
2	Santa Fe	22	10	8	4	26	13	+13	38	Advanced to the Semifinals
3	Atlético Nacional	22	10	8	4	24	18	+6	38	Advanced to the Semifinals
4	Envigado	22	10	6	6	21	18	+3	36	Advanced to the Semifinals
5	Deportivo Pasto	22	9	7	6	29	27	+2	34	Advanced to the Semifinals
6	Atlético Bucaramanga	22	9	6	7	24	22	+2	33	Advanced to the Semifinals
7	Unión Magdalena	22	9	6	7	27	27	0	33	Advanced to the Semifinals
8	América de Cali	22	8	9	5	27	22	+5	33	Advanced to the Semifinals
9	Once Caldas	22	9	5	8	36	29	+7	32	
10	Deportivo Pereira	22	8	8	6	20	16	+4	32	
11	Deportes Quindío	22	7	9	6	24	30	−6	30	
12	Junior	22	7	5	10	19	25	−6	26	
13	Millonarios	22	5	8	9	17	21	−4	23	
14	Atlético Huila	22	5	7	10	21	32	−11	22	
15	Cortuluá	22	5	6	11	16	25	−9	21	
16	Independiente Medellín	22	4	9	9	26	32	−6	21	
17	Real Cartagena	22	4	8	10	17	25	−8	20	
18	Deportes Tolima	22	3	9	10	18	30	−12	18	

Source: RSSSF

=== Semifinals ===
==== Group A ====
Standings

Pos	Team	Pld	W	D	L	GF	GA	GD	Pts	Qualification
1	Atlético Nacional	6	5	1	0	12	4	+8	16	Advanced to the Finals
2	Unión Magdalena	6	3	0	3	12	9	+3	9	
3	Deportivo Cali	6	2	2	2	11	13	−2	8	
4	Deportivo Pasto	6	0	1	5	4	13	−9	1	

Source: RSSSF

Results

Home \ Away	NAC	CAL	PAS	MAG
Atlético Nacional		2–1	3–0	2–1
Deportivo Cali	2–2		3–1	4–1
Deportivo Pasto	0–2	1–1		1–2
Unión Magdalena	0–1	6–0	2–1	

Source: RSSSF
Legend: Blue = home team win; Yellow = draw; Red = away team win.

==== Group B ====
Standings

Pos	Team	Pld	W	D	L	GF	GA	GD	Pts	Qualification
1	América de Cali	6	4	0	2	6	6	0	12	Advanced to the Finals
2	Santa Fe	6	3	2	1	9	5	+4	11	
3	Envigado	6	2	2	2	6	4	+2	8	
4	Atlético Bucaramanga	6	0	2	4	4	10	−6	2	

Source: RSSSF

Results

Home \ Away	AME	BUC	ENV	SFE
América de Cali		1–0	2–1	2–1
Atlético Bucaramanga	0–1		0–2	2–2
Envigado	2–0	1–1		0–1
Santa Fe	2–0	3–1	0–0	

Source: RSSSF
Legend: Blue = home team win; Yellow = draw; Red = away team win.

=== Finals ===
Date	City	Home	Score	Away
June 16	Cali	América de Cali	2–1	Atlético Nacional
June 19	Medellín	Atlético Nacional	0–1	América de Cali
América de Cali won 3–1 on aggregate score.

=== Top goalscorers ===
Rank	Name	Club	Goals
1	(Colombia) Luis Zuleta	Unión Magdalena	13
2	(Colombia) José Herrera	Unión Magdalena	12
2	(Colombia) Jorge Agudelo	Atlético Nacional	12
4	(Colombia) Carlos Castillo	Deportivo Cali	11
4	(Colombia) Leonardo Mina Polo	Deportivo Cali	11
4	(Colombia) Carlos Vilarete	Unión Magdalena	11
7	(Colombia) Wilson Carpintero	Atlético Bucaramanga	9
7	(Colombia) Giovanni Hernández	Deportivo Cali	9
7	(Colombia) Léider Preciado	Once Caldas	9

== Torneo Finalización ==
The Torneo Finalización (officially the 2002 Copa Mustang II for sponsorship reasons) was the second tournament of the season. It began on 7 July and ended on 22 December.

=== First stage ===
==== Standings ====
Pos	Team	Pld	W	D	L	GF	GA	GD	Pts	Qualification
1	Deportivo Cali	22	14	5	3	38	15	+23	47	Advanced to the Semifinals
2	Deportivo Pasto	22	11	3	8	32	33	−1	36	Advanced to the Semifinals
3	Independiente Medellín	22	9	8	5	25	16	+9	35	Advanced to the Semifinals
4	América de Cali	22	10	4	8	26	24	+2	34	Advanced to the Semifinals
5	Atlético Bucaramanga	22	9	6	7	34	29	+5	33	Advanced to the Semifinals
6	Unión Magdalena	22	9	6	7	25	26	−1	33	Advanced to the Semifinals
7	Deportes Tolima	22	8	9	5	30	26	+4	33	Advanced to the Semifinals
8	Atlético Nacional	22	8	8	6	28	21	+7	32	Advanced to the Semifinals
9	Santa Fe	22	8	8	6	35	30	+5	32	
10	Once Caldas	22	7	11	4	23	17	+6	32	
11	Deportes Quindío	22	8	4	10	18	23	−5	28	
12	Cortuluá	22	8	4	10	21	27	−6	28	
13	Deportivo Pereira	22	7	5	10	27	34	−7	26	
14	Real Cartagena	22	7	4	11	20	30	−10	25	
15	Atlético Huila	22	6	7	9	21	29	−8	25	
16	Millonarios	22	6	5	11	25	31	−6	23	
17	Junior	22	4	9	9	27	33	−6	21	
18	Envigado	22	3	6	13	16	27	−11	15	

Source: RSSSF

=== Semifinals ===
==== Group A ====
Standings

Pos	Team	Pld	W	D	L	GF	GA	GD	Pts	Qualification
1	Independiente Medellín	6	3	2	1	7	4	+3	11	Advanced to the Finals
2	Deportivo Cali	6	3	1	2	8	5	+3	10	
3	Atlético Bucaramanga	6	2	1	3	5	8	−3	7	
4	Deportes Tolima	6	1	2	3	5	8	−3	5	

Source: RSSSF

Results

Home \ Away	BUC	TOL	CAL	DIM
Atlético Bucaramanga		2–0	1–2	1–0
Deportes Tolima	1–1		2–0	1–3
Deportivo Cali	4–0	1–0		0–1
Independiente Medellín	1–0	1–1	1–1	

Source: RSSSF
Legend: Blue = home team win; Yellow = draw; Red = away team win.

==== Group B ====
Standings

Pos	Team	Pld	W	D	L	GF	GA	GD	Pts	Qualification
1	Deportivo Pasto	6	3	2	1	7	5	+2	11	Advanced to the Finals
2	América de Cali	6	3	1	2	8	6	+2	10	
3	Unión Magdalena	6	2	1	3	6	8	−2	7	
4	Atlético Nacional	6	1	2	3	4	6	−2	5	

Source: RSSSF

Results

Home \ Away	AME	NAC	PAS	MAG
América de Cali		2–1	3–0	2–0
Atlético Nacional	0–0		1–1	2–0
Deportivo Pasto	2–0	1–0		3–1
Unión Magdalena	3–1	2–0	0–0	

Source: RSSSF
Legend: Blue = home team win; Yellow = draw; Red = away team win.

=== Finals ===
Date	City	Home	Score	Away
December 18	Medellín	Independiente Medellín	2–0	Deportivo Pasto
December 22	Pasto	Deportivo Pasto	1–1	Independiente Medellín
Independiente Medellín won 3–1 on aggregate score.

=== Top goalscorers ===
Rank	Name	Club	Goals
1	(Colombia) Orlando Ballesteros	Atlético Bucaramanga	13
1	(Colombia) Milton Rodríguez	Deportivo Pereira	13
3	(Colombia) Léider Preciado	Deportivo Cali	11
3	(Colombia) Pablo Jaramillo	Deportivo Pasto	11
5	(Colombia) Ricardo Ciciliano	Deportes Tolima	10
5	(Colombia) Jairo Patiño	Deportivo Pasto	10

== Aggregate table ==
An aggregate table including all games that a team played during the year was used to determine berths to both the Copa Libertadores and the Copa Sudamericana. The best-placed non-champion qualified for the 2003 Copa Libertadores along with both champions of the season, while the second and third best-placed non-champions qualified for the 2003 Copa Sudamericana.

Pos	Team	Pld	W	D	L	GF	GA	GD	Pts	Qualification
1	Deportivo Cali	56	30	14	12	101	57	+44	104	2003 Copa Libertadores
2	América de Cali (C)	58	27	14	17	63	58	+5	95	2003 Copa Libertadores
3	Atlético Nacional	58	24	19	15	68	49	+19	91	2003 Copa Sudamericana
4	Deportivo Pasto	58	23	14	21	73	81	−8	83	2003 Copa Sudamericana
5	Unión Magdalena	56	23	13	20	70	70	0	82	
6	Santa Fe	50	21	18	11	70	48	+22	81	
7	Atlético Bucaramanga	56	20	15	21	67	69	−2	75	
8	Independiente Medellín (C)	52	17	20	15	61	53	+8	71	2003 Copa Libertadores
9	Once Caldas	44	16	16	12	59	46	+13	64	
10	Envigado	50	15	14	21	43	49	−6	59	
11	Deportivo Pereira	44	15	13	16	47	50	−3	58	
12	Deportes Quindío	44	15	13	16	42	53	−11	58	
13	Deportes Tolima	50	12	20	18	53	64	−11	56	
14	Cortuluá	44	13	10	21	37	52	−15	49	
15	Junior	44	11	14	19	46	58	−12	47	
16	Atlético Huila	44	11	14	19	42	61	−19	47	
17	Millonarios	44	11	13	20	42	52	−10	46	
18	Real Cartagena	44	11	12	21	37	55	−18	45	

Source: RSSSF
(C) Champions

== Relegation ==
Pos	Team	Pld	Pts	Avg	Relegation
1	América de Cali	132	221	1.674	
2	Deportivo Cali	132	221	1.674	
3	Santa Fe	132	207	1.568	
4	Once Caldas	132	205	1.553	
5	Atlético Nacional	132	193	1.462	
6	Deportes Tolima	132	188	1.424	
7	Millonarios	132	180	1.364	
8	Deportivo Pasto	132	176	1.333	
9	Junior	132	173	1.311	
10	Independiente Medellín	132	172	1.303	
11	Envigado	132	170	1.288	
12	Cortuluá	132	165	1.25	
13	Deportivo Pereira	132	159	1.205	
14	Unión Magdalena	132	154	1.167	
15	Atlético Bucaramanga	132	154	1.167	
16	Deportes Quindío	132	153	1.159	
17	Atlético Huila	132	142	1.076	
18	Real Cartagena	132	142	1.076	Relegated to the Categoría Primera B

Rules for classification: 1st average; 2nd wins; 3rd goal difference; 4th number of goals scored; 5th away goals scored.
