= 2005 Categoría Primera A season =

Colombian football league season

The 2005 Categoría Primera A season was the 58th season of Colombia's top-flight football league. Atlético Nacional won the Campeonato Apertura and Deportivo Cali won the Campeonato Finalizacion.

== Campeonato Apertura ==
The Copa Mustang 2005-I is the first tournament of the year. This season included the new team Boyacá Chicó; changing its name from Chico FC, they also moved to Tunja from Bogotá. The season began on February 12, and concluded on June 26.

=== First stage ===
==== Standings ====
| Pos | Team | Pts | GP | W | D | L | GF | GA | GD |
|---|---|---|---|---|---|---|---|---|---|
| 1. | Atlético Nacional | 36 | 18 | 10 | 6 | 2 | 36 | 20 | +16 |
| 2. | Independiente Santa Fe | 28 | 18 | 7 | 7 | 4 | 20 | 16 | +4 |
| 3. | Independiente Medellín | 27 | 18 | 8 | 3 | 7 | 22 | 23 | -1 |
| 4. | Envigado FC | 27 | 18 | 7 | 6 | 5 | 33 | 24 | +9 |
| 5. | Deportivo Cali | 27 | 18 | 7 | 6 | 5 | 24 | 18 | +6 |
| 6. | Atlético Huila | 27 | 18 | 7 | 6 | 5 | 16 | 12 | +4 |
| 7. | Deportes Tolima | 27 | 18 | 6 | 9 | 3 | 21 | 14 | +7 |
| 8. | Once Caldas | 26 | 18 | 6 | 8 | 4 | 21 | 17 | +4 |
| 9. | Deportivo Pasto | 26 | 18 | 6 | 8 | 4 | 22 | 21 | +1 |
| 10. | Atlético Junior | 25 | 18 | 7 | 4 | 7 | 26 | 23 | +3 |
| 11. | Real Cartagena | 24 | 18 | 7 | 3 | 8 | 18 | 20 | -2 |
| 12. | América de Cali | 24 | 18 | 6 | 6 | 6 | 24 | 26 | -2 |
| 13. | Boyacá Chicó | 22 | 18 | 6 | 4 | 8 | 18 | 19 | -1 |
| 14. | Millonarios | 21 | 18 | 4 | 9 | 5 | 25 | 33 | -8 |
| 15. | Atlético Bucaramanga | 20 | 18 | 5 | 5 | 8 | 14 | 18 | -4 |
| 16. | Unión Magdalena | 16 | 18 | 4 | 4 | 10 | 11 | 22 | -11 |
| 17. | Deportes Quindío | 16 | 18 | 4 | 4 | 10 | 14 | 32 | -18 |
| 18. | Deportes Pereira | 14 | 18 | 2 | 8 | 8 | 15 | 22 | -7 |

| Qualified for Semifinal Group Stage |
| Didn't Qualify |

=== Fixtures ===
Fixture 1 - February 13, 2005
| Home | Score | Away |
|---|---|---|
| Envigado | 4 - 1 | Millonarios |
| Cali | 0 - 1 | Medellín |
| Nacional | 2 - 1 | América |
| Tolima | 1 - 1 | Pasto |
| Santa Fe | 3 - 1 | Quindío |
| Once Caldas | 1 - 0 | Cartagena |
| Chico FC | 1 - 0 | Huila |
| Bucaramanga | 0 - 1 | Pereira |
| Magdalena | 1 - 0 | Junior |

Fixture 2 - February 16, 2005
| Home | Score | Away |
|---|---|---|
| Huila | 0 - 0 | Tolima |
| Millonarios | 2 - 2 | Chico FC |
| Pereira | 1 - 1 | Envigado |
| Medellín | 0 - 1 | Bucaramanga |
| Cartagena | 1 - 3 | Nacional |
| Quindío | 0 - 1 | Once Caldas |
| Pasto | 1 - 1 | Santa Fe |
| Junior | 3 - 3 | Cali |
| América | 2 - 1 | Magdalena |

Fixture 3 - February 19, 2005
| Home | Score | Away |
|---|---|---|
| Nacional | 3 - 0 | Quindío |
| Santa Fe | 0 - 2 | Tolima |
| Magdalena | 0 - 1 | Cartagena |
| Bucaramanga | 0 - 2 | Junior |
| Envigado | 3 - 3 | Medellín |
| Chico FC | 2 - 1 | Pereira |
| Huila | 1 - 1 | Millonarios |
| Once Caldas | 1 - 1 | Pasto |
| América | 0 - 0 | Cali |

Fixture 4 - February 26 & February 27, 2005
| Home | Score | Away |
|---|---|---|
| Santa Fe | 1 - 0 | Once Caldas |
| Tolima | 3 - 3 | Millonarios |
| Pereira | 0 - 0 | Huila |
| Junior | 3 - 2 | Envigado |
| América | 1 - 2 | Bucaramanga |
| Cartagena | 0 - 1 | Cali |
| Quindío | 2 - 0 | Magdalena |
| Pasto | 1 - 1 | Nacional |
| Medellín | 1 - 0 | Chico FC |

Fixture 5 - March 2, 2005
| Home | Score | Away |
|---|---|---|
| Nacional | 1 - 1 | Santa Fe |
| Magdalena | 2 - 0 | Pasto |
| Cali | 3 - 0 | Quindío |
| Bucaramanga | 0 - 1 | Cartagena |
| Envigado | 1 - 1 | América |
| Huila | 1 - 0 | Medellín |
| Millonarios | 3 - 2 | Pereira |
| Once Caldas | 1 - 2 | Tolima |
| Chico FC | 2 - 0 | Junior |

Fixture 6 - March 5 & March 6, 2005
| Home | Score | Away |
|---|---|---|
| Medellín | 2 - 1 | Millonarios |
| Tolima | 2 - 0 | Pereira |
| Junior | 1 - 0 | Huila |
| América | 1 - 1 | Chico FC |
| Cartagena | 0 - 1 | Envigado |
| Quindío | 2 - 1 | Bucaramanga |
| Pasto | 1 - 0 | Cali |
| Santa Fe | 0 - 0 | Magdalena |
| Once Caldas | 1 - 2 | Nacional |

Fixture 7 - March 12 & March 13, 2005
| Home | Score | Away |
|---|---|---|
| Cali | 1 - 1 | Santa Fe |
| Nacional | 1 - 3 | Tolima |
| Magdalena | 1 - 1 | Once Caldas |
| Bucaramanga | 2 - 0 | Pasto |
| Envigado | 3 - 0 | Quindío |
| Chico FC | 1 - 2 | Cartagena |
| Huila | 3 - 0 | América |
| Millonarios | 0 - 0 | Junior |
| Pereira | 3 - 0 | Medellín |

Fixture 8 - March 16, 2005
| Home | Score | Away |
|---|---|---|
| Santa Fe | 0 - 0 | Bucaramanga |
| Tolima | 0 - 0 | Medellín |
| América | 1 - 1 | Millonarios |
| Cartagena | 1 - 1 | Huila |
| Quindío | 1 - 0 | Chico FC |
| Pasto | 2 - 1 | Envigado |
| Once Caldas | 1 - 1 | Cali |
| Nacional | 2 - 0 | Magdalena |
| Junior | 2 - 0 | Pereira |

Fixture 9 - March 20, 2005
| Home | Score | Away |
|---|---|---|
| Millonarios | 0 - 3 | Santa Fe |
| Pereira | 2 - 2 | Once Caldas |
| Medellín | 0 - 4 | Nacional |
| Junior | 0 - 1 | Magdalena |
| Cali | 2 - 0 | América |
| Cartagena | 1 - 0 | Bucaramanga |
| Quindío | 1 - 4 | Envigado |
| Pasto | 1 - 0 | Chico FC |
| Tolima | 1 - 2 | Huila |

Fixture 10 - April 3, 2005
| Home | Score | Away |
|---|---|---|
| Cali | 3 - 3 | Nacional |
| Envigado | 2 - 1 | Santa Fe |
| Magdalena | 0 - 0 | Tolima |
| Bucaramanga | 1 - 1 | Once Caldas |
| Chico FC | 3 - 4 | Pasto |
| Huila | 2 - 0 | Quindío |
| Millionarios | 2 - 1 | Cartagena |
| Pereira | 1 - 2 | América |
| Medellín | 1 - 0 | Junior |

Fixture 11 - April 6, 2005
| Home | Score | Away |
|---|---|---|
| Tolima | 1 - 1 | Junior |
| Quindío | 3 - 3 | Millonarios |
| Pasto | 3 - 1 | Huila |
| Santa Fe | 1 - 0 | Chico FC |
| Once Caldas | 2 - 2 | Envigado |
| Nacional | 3 - 2 | Bucaramanga |
| Magdalena | 2 - 0 | Cali |
| América | 3 - 2 | Medellín |
| Cartagena | 1 - 1 | Pereira |

Fixture 12 - April 10, 2005
| Home | Score | Away |
|---|---|---|
| Envigado | 2 - 4 | Nacional |
| Cali | 1 - 2 | Tolima |
| Bucaramanga | 2 - 1 | Magdalena |
| Junior | 5 - 3 | América |
| Chico FC | 1 - 1 | Once Caldas |
| Huila | 0 - 0 | Santa Fe |
| Millonarios | 2 - 2 | Pasto |
| Pereira | 1 - 1 | Quindío |
| Medellín | 2 - 1 | Cartagena |

Fixture 13 - April 17, 2005
| Home | Score | Away |
|---|---|---|
| Nacional | 2 - 0 | Chico FC |
| Tolima | 0 - 0 | América |
| Cartagena | 3 - 1 | Junior |
| Quindío | 0 - 0 | Medellín |
| Santa Fe | 0 - 1 | Millonarios |
| Once Caldas | 1 - 0 | Huila |
| Pasto | 0 - 0 | Pereira |
| Magdalena | 1 - 3 | Envigado |
| Cali | 2 - 0 | Bucaramanga |

Fixture 14 - April 24, 2005
| Home | Score | Away |
|---|---|---|
| Millonarios | 0 - 3 | Once Caldas |
| América | 2 - 1 | Cartagena |
| Bucaramanga | 0 - 0 | Tolima |
| Envigado | 0 - 0 | Cali |
| Chico FC | 1 - 0 | Magdalena |
| Huila | 0 - 0 | Nacional |
| Pereira | 0 - 1 | Santa Fe |
| Medellín | 2 - 1 | Pasto |
| Junior | 3 - 1 | Quindío |

Fixture 15 - May 1, 2005
| Home | Score | Away |
|---|---|---|
| Santa Fe | 2 - 1 | Medellín |
| Tolima | 1 - 2 | Cartagena |
| Quindío | 1 - 0 | América |
| Pasto | 2 - 1 | Junior |
| Once Caldas | 1 - 0 | Pereira |
| Nacional | 1 - 1 | Millonarios |
| Magdalena | 0 - 1 | Huila |
| Cali | 1 - 0 | Chico FC |
| Bucaramanga | 0 - 0 | Envigado |

Fixture 16 - May 7, 2005
| Home | Score | Away |
|---|---|---|
| Envigado | 2 - 0 | Tolima |
| Chico FC | 2 - 0 | Bucaramanga |
| Huila | 2 - 0 | Cali |
| Millonarios | 1 - 0 | Magdalena |
| Pereira | 1 - 1 | Nacional |
| Medellín | 1 - 0 | Once Caldas |
| Junior | 1 - 1 | Santa Fe |
| América | 1 - 0 | Pasto |
| Cartagena | 1 - 0 | Quindío |

Fixture 17 - May 11, 2005
| Home | Score | Away |
|---|---|---|
| Tolima | 3 - 0 | Quindío |
| Pasto | 1 - 1 | Cartagena |
| Santa Fe | 2 - 5 | América |
| Once Caldas | 2 - 1 | Junior |
| Nacional | 3 - 1 | Medellín |
| Magdalena | 1 - 1 | Pereira |
| Cali | 4 - 2 | Millonarios |
| Bucaramanga | 2 - 0 | Huila |
| Envigado | 1 - 2 | Chico FC |

Fixture 18 - May 15, 2005
| Home | Score | Away |
|---|---|---|
| Chico FC | 0 - 0 | Tolima |
| Huila | 2 - 1 | Envigado |
| Millonarios | 1 - 1 | Bucaramanga |
| Pereira | 0 - 2 | Cali |
| Medellín | 5 - 0 | Magdalena |
| América | 1 - 1 | Once Caldas |
| Junior | 2 - 0 | Nacional |
| Cartagena | 0 - 2 | Santa Fe |
| Quindío | 1 - 1 | Pasto |

=== Semifinals ===
The second phase of the 2005-I tournament consisted of two groups of 4 teams. This was disputed by the best eight teams from the first phase of the tournament. The winners of each group face in the finals to define a champion.

==== Group A ====
| Seed | Pos | Team | Pts | GP | W | D | L | GF | GA | GD |
|---|---|---|---|---|---|---|---|---|---|---|
| (1) | 1. | Atlético Nacional | 14 | 6 | 4 | 2 | 0 | 11 | 5 | +6 |
| (7) | 2. | Deportes Tolima | 13 | 6 | 4 | 1 | 1 | 13 | 9 | +4 |
| (3) | 3. | Independiente Medellín | 6 | 6 | 2 | 0 | 4 | 11 | 15 | -4 |
| (5) | 4. | Deportivo Cali | 1 | 6 | 0 | 1 | 5 | 6 | 12 | -6 |

Fixture 1 - May 18, 2005
| Home | Score | Away |
|---|---|---|
| Nacional | 0 - 0 | Cali |
| Tolima | 3 - 1 | Medellín |

Fixture 2 - May 22, 2005
| Home | Score | Away |
|---|---|---|
| Cali | 0 - 1 | Tolima |
| Medellín | 1 - 2 | Nacional |

Fixture 3 - May 25, 2005
| Home | Score | Away |
|---|---|---|
| Cali | 1 - 2 | Medellín |
| Nacional | 4 - 1 | Tolima |

Fixture 4 - November 26, 2005
| Home | Score | Away |
|---|---|---|
| Medellín | 4 - 3 | Cali |
| Tolima | 1 - 1 | Nacional |

Fixture 5 - June 15, 2005
| Home | Score | Away |
|---|---|---|
| Tolima | 3 - 1 | Cali |
| Nacional | 2 - 1 | Medellín |

Fixture 6 - June 19, 2005
| Home | Score | Away |
|---|---|---|
| Cali | 1 - 2 | Nacional |
| Medellín | 2 - 4 | Tolima |

==== Group B ====
| Seed | Pos | Team | Pts | GP | W | D | L | GF | GA | Dif |
|---|---|---|---|---|---|---|---|---|---|---|
| (2) | 1. | Independiente Santa Fe | 12 | 6 | 4 | 0 | 2 | 8 | 5 | +3 |
| (4) | 2. | Envigado | 11 | 6 | 3 | 2 | 1 | 9 | 6 | +3 |
| (6) | 3. | Atlético Huila | 6 | 6 | 1 | 3 | 2 | 10 | 12 | -2 |
| (8) | 4. | Once Caldas | 3 | 6 | 0 | 3 | 3 | 6 | 10 | -4 |

Fixture 1 - May 18, 2005
| Home | Score | Away |
|---|---|---|
| Santa Fe | 4 - 2 | Huila |
| Envigado | 2 - 1 | Once Caldas |

Fixture 2 - May 22, 2005
| Home | Score | Away |
|---|---|---|
| Huila | 2 - 2 | Envigado |
| Once Caldas | 0 - 1 | Santa Fe |

Fixture 3 - May 25, 2005
| Home | Score | Away |
|---|---|---|
| Huila | 2 - 2 | Once Caldas |
| Santa Fe | 0 - 2 | Envigado |

Fixture 4 - June 11, 2005
| Home | Score | Away |
|---|---|---|
| Envigado | 0 - 1 | Santa Fe |
| Once Caldas | 2 - 2 | Huila |

Fixture 5 - June 15, 2005
| Home | Score | Away |
|---|---|---|
| Envigado | 2 - 1 | Huila |
| Santa Fe | 2 - 0 | Once Caldas |

Fixture 6 - June 19, 2005
| Home | Score | Away |
|---|---|---|
| Huila | 1 - 0 | Santa Fe |
| Once Caldas | 1 - 1 | Envigado |

=== Finals ===
| Date | City | Home | Score | Away |
|---|---|---|---|---|
| June 22 | Bogotá | Independiente Santa Fe | 0 - 0 | Atlético Nacional |
| June 26 | Medellín | Atlético Nacional | 2 - 0 | Independiente Santa Fe |
Atlético Nacional won 2 - 0 on aggregate

== Campeonato Finalización ==
The Copa Mustang 2005-II was the second tournament of the year. The season began on July 10 and finished December 18.

=== First stage ===
==== Standings ====
| Pos | Team | Pts | GP | W | D | L | GF | GA | Dif |
|---|---|---|---|---|---|---|---|---|---|
| 1. | Deportivo Cali | 30 | 18 | 8 | 6 | 4 | 30 | 23 | +7 |
| 2. | Independiente Medellín | 29 | 18 | 9 | 2 | 7 | 28 | 23 | +5 |
| 3. | América de Cali | 29 | 18 | 9 | 2 | 7 | 24 | 20 | +4 |
| 4. | Deportivo Pereira | 29 | 18 | 9 | 2 | 7 | 27 | 26 | +1 |
| 5. | Atlético Junior | 29 | 18 | 9 | 2 | 7 | 22 | 27 | -5 |
| 6. | Real Cartagena | 29 | 18 | 8 | 5 | 5 | 26 | 19 | +7 |
| 7. | Once Caldas | 29 | 18 | 8 | 5 | 5 | 25 | 21 | +4 |
| 8. | Santa Fe | 29 | 18 | 8 | 5 | 5 | 20 | 17 | +3 |
| 9. | Deportes Tolima | 27 | 18 | 8 | 3 | 7 | 24 | 18 | +6 |
| 10. | Atlético Bucaramanga | 27 | 18 | 7 | 6 | 5 | 24 | 16 | +8 |
| 11. | Atlético Nacional | 26 | 18 | 6 | 8 | 4 | 22 | 16 | +6 |
| 12. | Deportivo Pasto | 25 | 18 | 7 | 4 | 7 | 20 | 18 | +2 |
| 13. | Deportes Quindío | 25 | 18 | 7 | 4 | 7 | 18 | 19 | -1 |
| 14. | Millonarios | 24 | 18 | 7 | 3 | 8 | 22 | 21 | +1 |
| 15. | Envigado FC | 21 | 18 | 5 | 6 | 7 | 20 | 22 | -2 |
| 16. | Atlético Huila | 16 | 18 | 4 | 4 | 10 | 18 | 32 | -14 |
| 17. | Boyacá Chicó | 15 | 18 | 3 | 6 | 9 | 12 | 24 | -12 |
| 18. | Unión Magdalena | 7 | 18 | 0 | 7 | 11 | 15 | 35 | -15 |

| Qualified for Semifinal Group Stage. |
| Didn't Qualify |

=== Fixtures ===
Fixture 1 - July 10, 2005
| Home | Score | Away |
|---|---|---|
| Pasto | 2 - 1 | Tolima |
| Quindío | 0 - 0 | Santa Fe |
| Cartagena | 3 - 0 | Once Caldas |
| América | 1 - 0 | Nacional |
| Junior | 2 - 1 | Magdalena |
| Medellín | 0 - 1 | Cali |
| Pereira | 1 - 0 | Bucaramanga |
| Millonarios | 2 - 1 | Envigado |
| Huila | 3 - 0 | Chico FC |

Fixture 2 - July 16, 2005
| Home | Score | Away |
|---|---|---|
| Cali | 4 - 1 | Junior |
| Tolima | 2 - 0 | Huila |
| Chico FC | 0 - 2 | Millonarios |
| Envigado | 2 - 1 | Pereira |
| Bucaramanga | 4 - 0 | Medellín |
| Magdalena | 1 - 3 | América |
| Nacional | 1 - 1 | Cartagena |
| Once Caldas | 1 - 0 | Quindío |
| Santa Fe | 2 - 0 | Pasto |

Fixture 3 - February 19, 2005
| Home | Score | Away |
|---|---|---|
| Millonarios | 2 - 0 | Huila |
| Tolima | 2 - 1 | Santa Fe |
| Pasto | 1 - 0 | Once Caldas |
| Quindío | 1 - 1 | Nacional |
| Cartagena | 2 - 1 | Magdalena |
| Junior | 0 - 0 | Bucaramanga |
| Medellín | 1 - 1 | Envigado |
| Pereira | 2 - 0 | Chico FC |
| América | 2 - 0 | Cali |

Fixture 4 - July 30 & July 31, 2005
| Home | Score | Away |
|---|---|---|
| Once Caldas | 0 - 0 | Santa Fe |
| Millonarios | 2 - 0 | Tolima |
| Envigado | 3 - 0 | Junior |
| Chico FC | 2 - 1 | Medellín |
| Bucaramanga | 0 - 2 | América |
| Cali | 2 - 2 | Cartagena |
| Magdalena | 0 - 1 | Quindío |
| Nacional | 1 - 0 | Pasto |
| Huila | 1 - 2 | Pereira |

Fixture 5 - August 3, 2005
| Home | Score | Away |
|---|---|---|
| Tolima | 3 - 1 | Once Caldas |
| Santa Fe | 1 - 2 | Nacional |
| Pasto | 1 - 1 | Magdalena |
| Quindío | 1 - 1 | Cali |
| Cartagena | 3 - 0 | Bucaramanga |
| América | 1 - 0 | Envigado |
| Junior | 2 - 1 | Chico FC |
| Medellín | 4 - 1 | Huila |
| Pereira | 0 - 2 | Millonarios |

Fixture 6 - August 6 & August 7, 2005
| Home | Score | Away |
|---|---|---|
| Millonarios | 1 - 0 | Medellín |
| Pereira | 2 - 0 | Tolima |
| Huila | 1 - 2 | Junior |
| Chico FC | 1 - 0 | América |
| Envigado | 1 - 1 | Cartagena |
| Bucaramanga | 2 - 0 | Quindío |
| Cali | 2 - 2 | Pasto |
| Magdalena | 1 - 1 | Santa Fe |
| Nacional | 2 - 1 | Once Caldas |

Fixture 7 - August 13 & August 14, 2005
| Home | Score | Away |
|---|---|---|
| Tolima | 1 - 1 | Nacional |
| Once Caldas | 4 - 0 | Magdalena |
| Santa Fe | 1 - 3 | Cali |
| Pasto | 1 - 0 | Bucaramanga |
| Quindío | 2 - 0 | Envigado |
| Cartagena | 2 - 1 | Chico FC |
| América | 2 - 1 | Huila |
| Junior | 4 - 3 | Millonarios |
| Medellín | 2 - 0 | Pereira |

Fixture 8 - August 20, 2005
| Home | Score | Away |
|---|---|---|
| Cali | 3 - 0 | Once Caldas |
| Medellín | 0 - 2 | Tolima |
| Pereira | 2 - 1 | Junior |
| Huila | 2 - 2 | Cartagena |
| Chico FC | 0 - 2 | Quindío |
| Bucaramanga | 3 - 0 | Santa Fe |
| Magdalena | 2 - 2 | Nacional |
| Millonarios | 0 - 1 | América |
| Envigado | 2 - 0 | Pasto |

Fixture 9 - August 28, 2005
| Home | Score | Away |
|---|---|---|
| Chico FC | 0 - 2 | Pasto |
| Once Caldas | 3 - 3 | Pereira |
| Santa Fe | 1 - 0 | Millonarios |
| Nacional | 3 - 2 | Medellín |
| Magdalena | 1 - 2 | Junior |
| Bucaramanga | 2 - 1 | Cartagena |
| Cali | 1 - 2 | América |
| Envigado | 2 - 1 | Quindío |
| Huila | 2 - 1 | Tolima |

Fixture - September 10, 2005
| Home | Score | Away |
|---|---|---|
| América | 0 - 1 | Pereira |
| Tolima | 1 - 1 | Magdalena |
| Nacional | 5 - 0 | Cali |
| Santa Fe | 0 - 0 | Envigado |
| Pasto | 1 - 1 | Chico FC |
| Quindío | 0 - 1 | Huila |
| Cartagena | 3 - 1 | Millonarios |
| Junior | 2 - 3 | Medellín |

Fixture 11 - September 17, 2005
| Home | Score | Away |
|---|---|---|
| Bucaramanga | 2 - 1 | Nacional |
| Junior | 1 - 0 | Tolima |
| Medellín | 3 - 1 | América |
| Pereira | 1 - 0 | Cartagena |
| Milonarios | 1 - 0 | Quindío |
| Huila | 0 - 4 | Pasto |
| Chico | 0 - 1 | Santa Fe |
| Envigado | 1 - 2 | Once Caldas |
| Cali | 4 - 2 | Magdalena |

Fixture 12 - September 25, 2005
| Home | Score | Away |
|---|---|---|
| Cartagena | 1 - 3 | Medellín |
| Tolima | 2 - 0 | Cali |
| Magdalena | 0 - 2 | Bucaramanga |
| Nacional | 1 - 0 | Envigado |
| Once Caldas | 2 - 1 | Chico FC |
| Santa Fe | 1 - 0 | Huila |
| Pasto | 1 - 0 | Millonarios |
| Quindío | 3 - 2 | Pereira |
| América | 4 - 1 | Junior |

Fixture 13 - October 2, 2005
| Home | Score | Away |
|---|---|---|
| Millonarios | 1 - 3 | Santa Fe |
| Junior | 0 - 0 | Cartagena |
| Bucaramanga | 1 - 1 | Cali |
| América | 0 - 2 | Tolima |
| Medellín | 4 - 0 | Quindío |
| Pereira | 5 - 3 | Pasto |
| Huila | 3 - 3 | Once Caldas |
| Chico FC | 0 - 0 | Nacional |
| Envigado | 2 - 1 | Magdalena |

Fixture 14 - October 16, 2005
| Home | Score | Away |
|---|---|---|
| Cartagena | 2 - 1 | América |
| Tolima | 1 - 0 | Bucaramanga |
| Cali | 1 - 1 | Envigado |
| Magdalena | 2 - 2 | Chico FC |
| Nacional | 1 - 2 | Huila |
| Once Caldas | 2 - 1 | Millonarios |
| Santa Fe | 4 - 2 | Pereira |
| Pasto | 0 - 1 | Medellín |
| Quindío | 3 - 1 | Junior |

Fixture 15 - October 19, 2005
| Home | Score | Away |
|---|---|---|
| Cartagena | 2 - 1 | Tolima |
| América | 2 - 2 | Quindío |
| Junior | 1 - 0 | Pasto |
| Huila | 0 - 0 | Magdalena |
| Medellín | 1 - 0 | Santa Fe |
| Pereira | 0 - 2 | Once Caldas |
| Millonarios | 0 - 0 | Nacional |
| Chico FC | 0 - 0 | Cali |
| Envigado | 2 - 2 | Bucaramanga |

Fixture 16 - October 23, 2005
| Home | Score | Away |
|---|---|---|
| Santa Fe | 1 - 0 | Junior |
| Tolima | 4 - 1 | Envigado |
| Bucaramanga | 1 - 1 | Chico FC |
| Cali | 2 - 0 | Huila |
| Magdalena | 1 - 1 | Millonarios |
| Nacional | 0 - 0 | Pereira |
| Once Caldas | 3 - 0 | Medellín |
| Pasto | 2 - 0 | América |
| Quindío | 1 - 0 | Cartagena |

Fixture 17 - October 20, 2005
| Home | Score | Away |
|---|---|---|
| América | 2 - 2 | Santa Fe |
| Chico FC | 1 - 0 | Envigado |
| Huila | 0 - 3 | Bucaramanga |
| Junior | 1 - 0 | Once Caldas |
| Medellín | 1 - 1 | Nacional |
| Millonarios | 1 - 2 | Cali |
| Pereira | 3 - 0 | Magdalena |
| Quindío | 1 - 0 | Tolima |
| Cartagena | 1 - 0 | Pasto |

Fixture 18 - November 6, 2005
| Home | Score | Away |
|---|---|---|
| Tolima | 1 - 1 | Chico FC |
| Envigado | 1 - 1 | Huila |
| Bucaramanga | 2 - 2 | Millonarios |
| Cali | 3 - 0 | Pereira |
| Magdalena | 0 - 2 | Medellín |
| Once Caldas | 1 - 0 | América |
| Nacional | 0 - 1 | Junior |
| Santa Fe | 1 - 0 | Cartagena |
| Pasto | 1 - 0 | Quindío |

=== Semifinals ===
The second phase of the 2006 tournament consisted of two groups of 4 teams. This was disputed by the best eight teams from the first phase of the tournament. The winners of each group face on in the finals to define a champion.

==== Group A ====
| Seed | Pos. | Team | Pts | GP | W | D | L | GF | GA | GD |
|---|---|---|---|---|---|---|---|---|---|---|
| (1) | 1. | Deportivo Cali | 11 | 6 | 3 | 2 | 1 | 10 | 6 | +4 |
| (5) | 2. | Atlético Junior | 10 | 6 | 3 | 1 | 2 | 7 | 8 | -1 |
| (7) | 3. | Once Caldas | 6 | 6 | 2 | 0 | 4 | 7 | 9 | -2 |
| (3) | 4. | América de Cali | 6 | 6 | 1 | 3 | 2 | 8 | 9 | -1 |

Fixture 1 - November 19, 2005
| Home | Score | Away |
|---|---|---|
| Once Caldas | 2 - 1 | América |
| Cali | 2 - 0 | Junior |

Fixture 2 - November 12, 2005
| Home | Score | Away |
|---|---|---|
| América | 1 - 1 | Junior |
| Once Caldas | 0 - 1 | Cali |

Fixture 3 - November 16, 2005
| Home | Score | Away |
|---|---|---|
| Junior | 1 - 0 | Once Caldas |
| Cali | 0 - 0 | América |

Fixture 4 - November 26, 2005
| Home | Score | Away |
|---|---|---|
| Junior | 3 - 2 | Cali |
| América | 3 - 2 | Once Caldas |

Fixture 5 - December 4, 2005
| Home | Score | Away |
|---|---|---|
| América | 2 - 2 | Cali |
| Once Caldas | 2 - 0 | Junior |

Fixture 6 - December 11, 2005
| Home | Score | Away |
|---|---|---|
| Cali | 3 - 1 | Once Caldas |
| Junior | 2 - 1 | América |

==== Group B ====
| Seed | Pos. | Team | Pts | GP | W | D | L | GF | GA | GD |
|---|---|---|---|---|---|---|---|---|---|---|
| (6) | 1. | Real Cartagena | 10 | 6 | 3 | 1 | 2 | 9 | 6 | +3 |
| (2) | 2. | Independiente Medellín | 10 | 6 | 3 | 1 | 2 | 9 | 7 | +2 |
| (8) | 3. | Santa Fe | 8 | 6 | 2 | 2 | 2 | 6 | 8 | -2 |
| (4) | 4. | Deportivo Pereira | 6 | 6 | 2 | 0 | 4 | 8 | 11 | -3 |

Fixture 1 - November 13, 2005
| Home | Score | Away |
|---|---|---|
| Medellín | 2 - 1 | Pereira |
| Santa Fe | 1 - 1 | Cartagena |

Fixture 2 - November 16, 2005
| Home | Score | Away |
|---|---|---|
| Pereira | 1 - 0 | Santa Fe |
| Cartagena | 1 - 0 | Medellín |

Fixture 3 - November 19, 2005
| Home | Score | Away |
|---|---|---|
| Medellín | 0 - 2 | Santa Fe |
| Pereira | 1 - 0 | Cartagena |

Fixture 4 - November 27, 2005
| Home | Score | Away |
|---|---|---|
| Cartagena | 3 - 2 | Pereira |
| Santa Fe | 1 - 1 | Medellín |

Fixture 5 - December 4, 2005
| Home | Score | Away |
|---|---|---|
| Santa Fe | 2 - 1 | Pereira |
| Medellín | 2 - 0 | Cartagena |

Fixture 6 - December 11, 2005
| Home | Score | Away |
|---|---|---|
| Pereira | 2 - 4 | Medellín |
| Cartagena | 4 - 0 | Santa Fe |

=== Finals ===
| Date | City | Home | Score | Away |
|---|---|---|---|---|
| December 14 | Cartagena | Real Cartagena | 0 - 2 | Deportivo Cali |
| December 18 | Cali | Deportivo Cali | 1 - 0 | Real Cartagena |
Deportivo Cali won 3 - 0 on aggregate.

== Relegated and Promoted Team(s) ==
| Categories | Relegated team(s) | Promoted team(s) |
|---|---|---|
| FPC; Primera B | Unión Magdalena | Cúcuta Deportivo |
