= Orlando Ballesteros =

Colombian footballer (born 1972)

Personal information
- Full name: Orlando Enrique Ballesteros Santos Maria
- Date of birth: 24 October 1972 (age 54)
- Place of birth: Colombia
- Position: Forward

Senior career*
Years	Team	Apps	(Gls)
1991–1994	Alianza Llanos		
1995–1997	Deportes Quindío		
1997–1999	Atlético Bucaramanga		
1999–2001	Atlético Junior		
2002	Atlético Bucaramanga		
2003–2004	Atlético Junior		
2005	Envigado FC		
2006	Millonarios FC		
2007	Unión Atlético Maracaibo		
2008	Deportivo Pereira		
2008	Envigado FC		
2009	Deportivo Pasto		
2010	Bogotá FC		
2011	Uniautónoma FC		
- * Club domestic league appearances and goals

Orlando Enrique Ballesteros Santos Maria (born 24 October 1972) is a Colombian former footballer who played as a forward.

== Life and career ==
Ballesteros started his career with Colombian side Alianza Llanos. In 1995, he signed for Colombian side Deportes Quindío. In 1997, he signed for Colombian side Atlético Bucaramanga. In 1999, he signed for Colombian side Atlético Junior. In 2002, he returned to Colombian side Atlético Bucaramanga. He was the top scorer of the 2002 Categoría Primera A finals with thirteen goals. In 2003, he returned to Colombian side Atlético Junior. He helped the club win the league.

In 2005, he signed for Colombian side Envigado FC. In 2006, he signed for Colombian side Millonarios FC. In 2007, he signed for Colombian side Unión Atlético Maracaibo. In 2008, he signed for Colombian side Deportivo Pereira. After that, he returned to Colombian side Envigado FC. In 2009, he signed for Colombian side Deportivo Pasto. In 2010, he signed for Colombian side Bogotá FC. In 2011, he signed for Colombian side Uniautónoma FC. He scored 184 goals during his career.

Ballesteros was born on 24 October 1972 in Colombia. He is a native of Barranquilla, Colombia. He has been nicknamed "El Fantastico", as well as "El Fantasma" (the Ghost). He has a brother. After retiring from playing professional football, he worked as a youth manager.

== Style of play ==
Ballesteros mainly operated as a forward. His playing style was described as "fantastic and ghostly". He was also known for his speed and agility.
