= Álvaro de Jesús Gómez =

Colombian football manager (born 1954)

Personal information
- Date of birth: 7 October 1954 (age 72)
- Place of birth: Colombia

Managerial career
- Years: Team
- 1990: Deportes Quindío
- 1991: Once Caldas
- 1997: Unión Minas
- 1998–1999: FBC Melgar
- 2002–2003: Centauros Villavicencio
- 2003: Patriotas Boyacá
- 2005: Cúcuta Deportivo
- 2006: Real Cartagena
- 2007: Deportivo Pasto
- 2008: ACCD Mineros de Guayana
- 2010–2011: Leones FC
- 2012: Atlético Bucaramanga
- 2012–2013: Atlético Huila
- 2015: Águilas Doradas
- 2018: CD FAS

Álvaro de Jesús Gómez (born 7 October 1954) is a Colombian former football manager.

== Early life ==
He was born in 1954 in Puerto Berrío, Colombia. He started becoming interested in football management at the age of fourteen.

== Career ==
In 1990, he was appointed manager of Colombian side Deportes Quindío. He was described as "obtained good results at the helm of Quindio". In 1991, he was appointed manager of Colombian side Once Caldas. In 1997, he was appointed manager of Colombian side Unión Minas. In 1998, he was appointed manager of Peruvian side FBC Melgar. In 2002, he was appointed manager of Colombian side Centauros Villavicencio. In 2003, he was appointed manager of Colombian side Patriotas Boyacá. In 2005, he was appointed manager of Colombian side Cúcuta Deportivo. He helped the club achieve promotion. In 2006, he was appointed manager of Colombian side Real Cartagena. In 2007, he was appointed manager of Colombian side Deportivo Pasto. In 2008, he was appointed manager of Colombian side ACCD Mineros de Guayana. In 2010, he was appointed manager of Colombian side Leones FC. In 2012, he was appointed manager of Colombian side Atlético Bucaramanga. After that, he was appointed manager of Colombian side Atlético Huila. In 2015, he was appointed manager of Colombian side Águilas Doradas. In 2018, he was appointed manager of Salvadoran side CD FAS.

== Personal life ==
He has been married. He has a daughter.
