= Isaac Arias =

Colombian footballer (born 1990)

Personal information
- Full name: Isaac Enrique Arias Villamíl
- Date of birth: 8 October 1990 (age 36)
- Place of birth: Valledupar, Colombia
- Height: 1.75 m (5 ft 9 in)
- Position: Forward

Team information
- Current team: Deportes Tolima
- Number: 14

Senior career*
Years	Team	Apps	(Gls)
2011–2014	Valledupar	77	(29)
2015–	Deportes Tolima	18	(4)
- * Club domestic league appearances and goals as of 22 June 2016 ‡ National team caps and goals as of 1 February 2016

Isaac Arias (born 8 October 1990) is a Colombian professional footballer who plays as a forward for Deportes Tolima.

== Honours ==
Deportes Tolima

- Copa Colombia (1): 2014
