= John Méndez =

Guatemalan footballer

Personal information
- Full name: John Roberth Méndez Sánchez
- Date of birth: 24 June 1999 (age 27)
- Place of birth: Guatemala City, Guatemala
- Height: 1.69 m (5 ft 7 in)
- Position: Midfielder

Team information
- Current team: Municipal
- Number: 11

Youth career
- Municipal

Senior career*
Years	Team	Apps	(Gls)
2016–	Municipal	172	(17)
2024	→ Achuapa (loan)	12	(4)

International career
2019	Guatemala U22		
2019–2021	Guatemala	5	(1)
- * Club domestic league appearances and goals as of 17 December 2022

John Roberth Méndez Sánchez (born 24 June 1999) is a Guatemalan professional footballer who plays as an attacking midfielder for Liga Nacional club Municipal.

== International career ==
He debuted internationally on 3 March 2019 in a 3–1 friendly loss to El Salvador.

Méndez played with the Guatemala U22s in a match against Brazil at the World Youth Festival Toulon on 2 June 2019, in a 4-0 defeat.

On 4 June 2021, Méndez scored his first senior goal for Guatemala against St. Vincent and the Grenadines in a 2022 FIFA World Cup qualifying match which ended in a 10-0 victory.

== Honours ==
Municipal

- Liga Nacional de Guatemala: Clausura 2017, Apertura 2019, Clausura 2024
