= Uniautónoma F.C. =

Colombian football club

Uniautónoma
- Full name: Corporación Deportiva Uniautónoma Fútbol Club
- Nicknames: La U El Equipo Universitario; Los Delfines del Caribe
- Founded: 1 November 2010; 15 years ago 4 September 2026; 34 days ago (Refounding)
- Ground: Estadio Moderno Julio Torres
- Capacity: 2,175
- President: Silvia Gette Ponce
- Head coach: Williams Fiorillo
- League: Categoría Primera C
- Website: www.uniautonomafc.com
| Home colours | Away colours | Third colours |

Corporación Deportiva Uniautónoma Fútbol Club, officially called by its corporate name Uniautónoma and formerly known as Universidad Autónoma del Caribe Fútbol Club, is a Colombian football club based in Barranquilla, which took part in the competitions organized by DIMAYOR from 2011 to 2015, and following its refoundation in 2026 participates in Categoría Primera C, the amateur third tier league of Colombian football.

Uniautónoma FC was founded by the Universidad Autónoma del Caribe in 2010 and represents the institution as its sports club. Its administrative headquarters are located in Barranquilla, and it held its training sessions at the university's sports camp, located in the municipality of Puerto Colombia.

During the five years that it competed in Colombian football as a professional team, Uniautónoma won the Categoría Primera B competition in 2013, which allowed them to take part in Categoría Primera A between 2014 and 2015, when the club was relegated back to the second tier and went defunct due to the sale of its DIMAYOR membership. It was refounded as an amateur club ten years later.

== History ==
Uniautónoma FC was founded in 2011 during Silvia Gette's rectorship of the Universidad Autónoma del Caribe, after Atlético de la Sabana relocated from Sincelejo. However they themselves were founded after Córdoba moved from Montería. Uniautónoma joined Categoría Primera B starting from that year, with Orlando Ballesteros scoring the club's first goal on 6 February 2011 in a 2–1 win over Barranquilla.

The club won the Primera B championship in 2013, and thus were promoted to the Categoría Primera A for 2014, where they remained for two years until their relegation at the end of the 2015 season. On 27 November 2015, the Universidad Autónoma del Caribe announced the club's dissolution in a release, arguing that the club represented a financial burden for the university and that its resources should be instead directed in their entirety toward its own missional objectives as an educational institution. Therefore, maintaining the club stopped being deemed as a priority.

The membership rights (ficha) held by the club were sold to Orsomarso S.C. from Palmira, who began playing in the Categoría Primera B from 2016 onwards.

Uniautónoma remained defunct for over a decade until 4 September 2026, when an event was held in Barranquilla to announce its refoundation. The refounded club, once again led by Silvia Gette, entered the Categoría Primera C competition with the squad and staff of amateur clubs Ilusión Naranja and Independiente Barranquilla.

== Stadium ==
In its first years as a professional club, Uniautónoma played its home matches at Estadio Marcos Henríquez in the municipality of Sabanalarga due to a veto on playing its matches at the Romelio Martínez Stadium exercised by fellow Barranquilla club Junior. Said veto was lifted following Uniautónoma's promotion to the top flight in 2014, when the club was able to return to Barranquilla and use Estadio Metropolitano Roberto Meléndez due to the infrastructure limitations of Estadio Marcos Henríquez.

Following its refoundation in 2026, it was announced that the club intends to play its home matches at Estadio Moderno Julio Torres in Barranquilla.

== Honours ==
=== Domestic ===
- Categoría Primera B
  - Winners (1): 2013

== Players ==
=== International players ===
In bold players who had international appearances for their country while playing for Uniautónoma.

- (Colombia) Andrés Roa (2013)
- (Colombia) Edgar Zapata (2014–15)
- (Colombia) Giovanni Hernández (2014)
- (Colombia) Javier Araújo (2014)
- (Colombia) José Amaya (2014–15)
- (Colombia) Martín Arzuaga (2013, 2014)
- (Colombia) Orlando Ballesteros (2011)
- (Panama) **Leonel Parris (2014)**

=== Records ===
==== Most capped players ====
Source: BDFA

| R | Player | P | Career | App. |
|---|---|---|---|---|
| 1 | (Colombia) Michael Barrios | FW | 2011–2015 | 137 |
| 2 | (Colombia) Daniel Machacón | MF | 2012–2015 | 135 |
| 3 | (Colombia) Alonso Acosta | DF | 2011, 2012–2015 | 128 |
| 4 | (Colombia) Nelino Tapia | MF | 2011–2015 | 123 |
| 5 | (Colombia) John Edison Méndez | MF | 2011–2014 | 119 |
| 6 | (Colombia) Orlando Niebles | DF | 2011–2014 | 115 |
| 7 | (Colombia) Carlos Pérez | GK | 2011–2012 | 64 |
| 8 | (Colombia) Carlos Saa | DF | 2013–2014 | 60 |
| 9 | (Colombia) Gabriel Martínez | DF | 2011–2014 | 57 |
| 10 | (Colombia) Giancarlos Torres | MF | 2011–2013 | 56 |

==== Top scorers ====
Source: BDFA

| R | Player | P | Career | G. |
|---|---|---|---|---|
| 1 | (Colombia) Michael Barrios | FW | 2011–2015 | **32** |
| 2 | (Colombia) Martín Arzuaga | FW | 2013, 2014 | **24** |
| 3 | (Colombia) Harry Castillo | MF | 2011–2012 | **18** |
| 4 | (Colombia) Yuberney Franco | FW | 2015 | **16** |
| 4 | (Colombia) John Edison Méndez | MF | 2011–2014 | **16** |
