= Mauricio Duarte =

Colombian footballer (born 1992)

Personal information
- Full name: Edison Mauricio Duarte Barajas
- Date of birth: 24 June 1992 (age 34)
- Place of birth: Cúcuta, Colombia
- Height: 1.71 m (5 ft 7 in)
- Position: Leftback

Team information
- Current team: Cúcuta Deportivo
- Number: 27

Senior career*
Years	Team	Apps	(Gls)
2011–2020	Cúcuta Deportivo	144	(8)
2017	→ Cortuluá (loan)	12	(0)
2020–2021	Defensa y Justicia	2	(0)
2021	Deportivo Pasto	15	(1)
2022	Águilas Doradas	35	(1)
2023	Central Córdoba (SdE)	0	(0)
2023–	Cúcuta Deportivo	42	(4)
- * Club domestic league appearances and goals as of 23 September 2024

Edison Mauricio Duarte Barajas (born 24 June 1992) is a Colombian professional footballer who plays as a leftback for Cúcuta Deportivo.

== Professional career ==
Duarte made his professional debut with Cúcuta in a 1-1 Categoría Primera A tie with Boyacá Chicó on 27 November 2011. A mainstay for Cúcuta from 2011 to 2020, he joined Defensa y Justicia on 25 January 2020.

== Honours ==
Cúcuta Deportivo

- Categoría Primera B: 2018

Defensa y Justicia

- Copa Sudamericana: 2020
