= José Largacha =

Colombian footballer (born 1987)

Personal information
- Full name: José Largacha Rivas
- Date of birth: January 3, 1987 (age 39)
- Place of birth: Istmina, Chocó, Colombia
- Height: 1.80 m (5 ft 11 in)
- Position: Forward

Team information
- Current team: Atlético Bucaramanga
- Number: 14

Senior career*
Years	Team	Apps	(Gls)
2005–2008	Independiente Santa Fe		
2009	Juventud Soacha		
2010–2012	Independiente Santa Fe	2	(0)
2010	→ Estudiantes de Mérida (loan)	10	(4)
2011	→ Patriotas FC (loan)	29	(11)
2012–2013	Atlético Bucaramanga	69	(23)
2014	Cúcuta Deportivo	12	(0)
2016–	Llaneros F.C.	10	(3)
- * Club domestic league appearances and goals as of November 3, 2012 ‡ National team caps and goals as of July 10, 2012

José Largacha Rivas is a Colombian football forward. He retired in 2016 with Llaneros.
