= John Jaramillo =

Colombian footballer (born 1980)

Personal information
- Full name: John Alexander Jaramillo Gómez
- Date of birth: June 11, 1980 (age 46)
- Place of birth: Medellín, Colombia
- Height: 1.70 m (5 ft 7 in)
- Position: Midfielder

Team information
- Current team: Fortaleza FC
- Number: 8

Senior career*
Years	Team	Apps	(Gls)
2000–2006	Independiente Medellín		
2006–2007	Deportivo Pasto		
2007	Independiente Medellín		
2008–2010	Atlético Huila	29	(1)
2009–2010	→ Atlético Junior (loan)	53	(1)
2011	Independiente Medellín	7	(0)
2011–2012	Atlético Bucaramanga	17	(0)
2012–	Fortaleza FC	12	(1)

International career
1999–2000	Colombia U-20	5	(1)
- * Club domestic league appearances and goals as of February 3, 2013

John Alexander Jaramillo Gómez (born 11 June 1980) is a Colombian football midfielder. He currently plays for Fortaleza.
