= Sebastián Támara =

Colombian footballer (born 1996)

Personal information
- Full name: Sebastián Támara Manrrique
- Date of birth: 10 May 1996 (age 30)
- Place of birth: Cúcuta, Colombia
- Height: 1.73 m (5 ft 8 in)
- Position: Forward

Team information
- Current team: Boyacá Chicó
- Number: 8

Senior career*
Years	Team	Apps	(Gls)
2016–2018	Atlético Nacional	12	(1)
2017	Leones (loan)	0	(0)
2018	C.D. Clan Juvenil	0	(0)
2021–	Boyacá Chicó	158	(11)
- * Club domestic league appearances and goals as of 21 June 2017

Sebastián Támara Manrrique (born 10 May 1996) is a Colombian professional footballer who plays as forward for Boyacá Chicó.
