= Brayan Moreno (footballer, born 1998) =

Colombian footballer (born 1998)

Personal information
- Full name: Brayan Moreno Cárdenas
- Date of birth: 26 June 1998 (age 28)
- Place of birth: Chocó, Colombia
- Height: 1.85 m (6 ft 1 in)
- Position: Forward

Team information
- Current team: Boyacá Chicó (on loan from Celaya)
- Number: 24

Senior career*
Years	Team	Apps	(Gls)
2019–2021	Celaya	1	(0)
2019	→ Atlético Huila (loan)	4	(0)
2020–2023	→ Boyacá Chicó (loan)	80	(14)
2023–	Cúcuta Deportivo	8	(0)
- * Club domestic league appearances and goals as of 12 October 2023

Brayan Moreno Cárdenas (born 26 June 1998) is a Colombian footballer who currently plays as a forward for Cúcuta Deportivo.

== Career statistics ==
=== Club ===
As of 16 April 2019.

Club	Season	League			Cup		Other		Total	
Club	Season	Division	Apps	Goals	Apps	Goals	Apps	Goals	Apps	Goals
Celaya	2018–19	Ascenso MX	1	0	0	0	0	0	1	0
Career total			1	0	0	0	0	0	1	0
