= Juan Carlos Patarroyo =

Colombian engineer and football chairman

Juan Carlos Patarroyo is a Colombian engineer and the chairman of Atletico Huila of the Categoría Primera A. He previously served as the club's vice president and is a stalwart upon its executive board.
