= Andrés Mosquera (footballer, born 1989) =

Colombian footballer

Andrés Javier Mosquera Murillo (born 19 September 1989 in Medellín, Colombia) is a Colombian former professional footballer who played as a forward.

== Teams ==
- La Equidad 2010
- Bogotá FC 2011–2012
- Independiente Medellín 2012
- Bogotá FC 2013
- Deportivo Pasto 2013–2014
- Deportes Copiapó 2014–2015
