= Real Cartagena =

Colombian football club

- Full name: Real Cartagena Fútbol Club S.A.
- Nicknames: El Real (The Royal), El Equipo Heroico (The Heroic Team)
- Founded: 10 January 1971; 55 years ago
- Ground: Jaime Morón León
- Capacity: 16,068
- Owner(s): Agencia ColombiaGol (73.59%); Rodrigo Rendón (21.08%); Cartagena de Indias District (4.83%)
- President: Renato Damiani
- Head coach: Álvaro Hernández
- League: Categoría Primera B
- 2025: Primera B, 7th of 16
- Website: www.realcartagena.com.co
| Home colours | Away colours | Third colours |

Real Cartagena is a professional Colombian football team based in Cartagena, that currently plays in the Categoría Primera B. They play their home games at the Jaime Morón León stadium.

== History ==
The origins of Real Cartagena date back to 1971, when Atlético Bucaramanga, which by the end of 1970 was going through a serious economic crisis which threatened its survival, rented its right to compete in the Colombian football championship. On 5 January 1971, DIMAYOR and Atlético Bucaramanga representatives met in Cartagena with counterparts from the city's local government and the Bolívar football league (Liga de Fútbol de Bolívar) and reached an agreement that saw Atlético Bucaramanga move to Cartagena with its squad and colours for the 1971 season, adopting the name Real Cartagena.

The team's first match was a friendly against Atlético Junior on 31 January 1971 at Estadio Pedro de Heredia which ended in a 1–1 draw, whilst its first match in the domestic league was played on 7 February 1971, a 1–0 win over Once Caldas. After this victory, Real Cartagena went winless for 10 games, and ended in 11th place in both the Apertura and Finalización tournaments. By the end of the year, Atlético Bucaramanga had solved its financial issues and the squad returned to their original name and colours for the following season, playing its first home matches in the 1972 Apertura tournament in Cartagena as a token of gratitude before returning to Bucaramanga.

After this experience in professional football, the club was bought by Pedro Juan Paternina and Miguel Guerra Pacheco and started playing in the amateur tournaments of the Bolívar Department league. By 1983, Real Cartagena started experiencing economic problems and was able to sign a partnership with Millonarios which turned it into the latter's official academy team in Cartagena. This partnership lasted until 1989. After this, the club changed its name to Atlético Cartagena and in 1991 it entered the newly formed third tier competition Categoría Primera C, reaching the final stage but failing to earn promotion to Categoría Primera B as they ended in third place.

In 1991 the Colombian football championship, now named Categoría Primera A, returned to Cartagena with Unión Magdalena's temporary move to the city under the name Unión La Cartagenera. With interest in football in the city peaking with the presence of a top-flight team as well as Atlético Cartagena's good performance in the lower tiers, local entrepreneurs moved themselves to help Cartagena have a representative in professional football. Thus, they bought Atlético Cartagena and rebranded it back to its original name of Real Cartagena, and then with the approval of DIMAYOR, bought the affiliation rights of Sporting de Barranquilla which went bankrupt by then. Real Cartagena was officially registered as a DIMAYOR affiliate club on 2 February 1992 and played its first match in Primera A seven days later, a 1–0 defeat to Unión Magdalena. The 1992 season ended with the club placing last and being relegated to Primera B.

The club spent seven years in the second tier, receiving economic support from América de Cali which turned Real Cartagena into a satellite club and helped it build a strong team to win the Primera B championship in 1999 and return to the top flight. Real Cartagena's third spell in Primera A lasted three years until 2002, when they were relegated once again. In 2003, the club failed to qualify for the Primera B play-offs, but in 2004 it reached the final against Deportivo Antioquia after clinching their qualification on the final day of the semifinal stage in a controversial match against Valledupar in which Real Cartagena scored four goals in the final five minutes of play to win 5–0 and edge Cúcuta Deportivo out on goal difference. They eventually beat Deportivo Antioquia over two legs in the final to win the competition and claim promotion back to the top flight.

In 2005, Real Cartagena did its best campaign ever in Primera A, placing in the top eight of the Finalización tournament and advancing to the semi-finals, in which they were placed into Group B along with Santa Fe, Independiente Medellín, and Deportivo Pereira. Real ended on top of the group with 10 points after winning 4–0 against Santa Fe on the final matchday, beating Independiente Medellín on goal difference to advance to the final series of the tournament. There they faced Deportivo Cali, losing both matches to end as tournament runners-up. The team's strong performance at home played a big role in this campaign, with 11 victories in 13 matches, and they also had in Jamerson Rentería one of the tournament's joint goalscorers, with 12 goals. The club was unable to replicate this performance in the following two years and were relegated at the end of the 2007 season, however, they were immediately promoted back the following year, defeating Deportivo Rionegro in the 2008 Primera B final.

Real Cartagena were relegated for the fourth time in history in 2012, after a 2–0 defeat at the hands of La Equidad left them unable to catch up with Patriotas and Cúcuta Deportivo in the relegation table, in which they earned only 117 points out of 321 possible ones. Since then, they have stayed in the second tier of Colombian football. In 2020, 74% of the club's shares was sold by the Rendón family to the player agency ColombiaGol, owned by player agent Helmut Wenning, which became the club's major shareholder. Upon its takeover of the club, ColombiaGol aimed to use the professional squad to promote youth footballers from the region.

== Home stadium ==
Real Cartagena play their home matches at the Estadio Jaime Morón León in Cartagena, formerly known as Estadio Pedro de Heredia after Cartagena's founder Pedro de Heredia, with a capacity of 16,068 people.

== Kits ==
- Home: Yellow shirt, green shorts and white socks.
- Away: White shirt, black shorts and white socks.

=== Kit manufacturer ===
| Period | Kit Manufacturer |
|---|---|
| 2002 | Saeta |
| 2006–07 | Lotto |
| 2008 | FSS |
| 2009 | Saeta |
| 2010 | Runic |
| 2011–12 | Lotto |
| 2013 | FSS |
| 2014 | Macron |
| 2015 | Kelme |
| 2016 | Dotta |
| 2017 | Kelme |
| 2018–2019 | Dotta |
| 2020– | Kimo |

== Honours ==
=== Domestic ===
- Categoría Primera A
  - Runners-up (1): 2005-II
- Categoría Primera B
  - Winners (3): 1999, 2004, 2008

== Current squad ==
As of 12 October 2026

Note: Flags indicate national team as defined under FIFA eligibility rules; some limited exceptions apply. Players may hold more than one non-FIFA nationality.

| No. | Pos. | Nation | Player |
|---|---|---|---|
| 1 | GK | COL | Aldo Montes |
| 3 | DF | COL | Humberto García |
| 5 | DF | COL | Jheison Solarte |
| 6 | MF | COL | Andrés Escobar |
| 7 | MF | COL | Jarlan Barrera |
| 8 | MF | COL | Luis Guevara |
| 9 | FW | COL | Mauro Manotas |
| 10 | FW | COL | Fredy Montero |
| 11 | FW | COL | Luis Ángel Yanes |
| 13 | MF | COL | Jhonatan Ríos |
| 14 | MF | COL | Didier Pino |
| 16 | MF | COL | Jaen Pineda |
| 17 | FW | COL | Janeth Alemán |

| No. | Pos. | Nation | Player |
|---|---|---|---|
| 18 | FW | COL | Juan Pablo Gallego |
| 20 | FW | COL | Luis Tafur |
| 21 | MF | COL | Juan David Rodríguez |
| 22 | GK | COL | Guillermo Gómez |
| 23 | MF | COL | Ronaldo Lora |
| 24 | DF | COL | Guillermo Tegue |
| 25 | DF | COL | Carlos de las Salas |
| 26 | DF | COL | Cristian Graciano |
| 27 | FW | COL | Álvaro Meléndez |
| 28 | DF | COL | Carlos Paternina |
| 33 | DF | COL | Marlon Balanta |
| 80 | MF | COL | Edison López |
| 99 | FW | COL | Diego Castillo |

== Managers ==
- (Uruguay) José Omar Verdún (1971)
- (Colombia) Juan Eduardo de Brigard (1992)
- (Colombia) Antonio Rada (1992)
- (Colombia) Carlos Peña (1993)
- (Colombia) José Grueso (1994)
- (Colombia) Álvaro Angulo (1995)
- (Colombia) Eduardo Retat (1996)
- (Colombia) Héctor Céspedes (1996)
- (Argentina) Daniel Siguero (1996–1997)
- (Colombia) José Grueso (1997)
- (Colombia) Hernán Herrera (1999–2000)
- (Lebanon) Alberto Rujana (January 2001 – December 2002)
- (Colombia) Orlando Restrepo (2003)
- (Colombia) Héctor Estrada (2003–2004)
- (Colombia) Carlos Estrada (2004)
- (Colombia) Hernán Herrera (2004–2005)
- (Colombia) Néstor Otero (2006)
- (Colombia) Álvaro de Jesús Gómez (2006)
- (Uruguay) Julio Comesaña (2006)
- (Colombia) Walter Aristizábal (2006)
- (Colombia) Hernán Herrera (2007)
- (Colombia) Hubert Bodhert (January 2008 – October 2011)
- (Argentina) Mario Vanemerak (October 2011 – April 2012)
- (Colombia) Germán González (May 2012 – August 2012)
- (Colombia) Hubert Bodhert (August 2012 – December 2012)
- (Colombia) José Santa (November 2012 – December 2013)
- (Portugal) José Dominguez (January 2014 – June 2014)
- (Colombia) Juan Eugenio Jiménez (August 2014 – January 2015)
- (Colombia) Jhon Jairo López (January 2015 – May 2015)
- (Colombia) Hubert Bodhert (July 2015 – March 2016)
- (Colombia) Giovanni Hernández (March 2016 – July 2016)
- (Colombia) José Manuel Rodríguez (July 2016 – December 2016)
- (Colombia) José Santa (March 2017 – November 2017)
- (Colombia) Marco Indaburo (December 2017 – May 2018)
- (Colombia) Ricardo Parra (May 2018 – May 2019)
- (Colombia) José Santa (May 2019 – September 2019)
- (Colombia) Milton García (September 2019 – December 2019)
- (Colombia) Nilton Bernal (January 2020 – May 2021)
- (Colombia) Jairo Patiño (May 2021 – September 2021)
- (Colombia) Stiven Sánchez (September 2021 – May 2022)
- (Colombia) Oscar Passo (May 2022 – September 2022)
- (Argentina) Martín Cardetti (September 2022 – November 2023)
- (Colombia) Oscar Passo (November 2023 – December 2023)
- (Colombia) Alberto Suárez (December 2023 – August 2024)
- (Uruguay) Sebastián Viera (September 2024 – April 2025)
- (Argentina) Martín Cardetti (April 2025 – August 2025)
- (Argentina) Néstor Craviotto (August 2025 – November 2025)
- (Colombia) Álvaro Hernández (December 2025 – Present)

== Affiliated teams ==
- (Spain) Mallorca
