= Adolfo Andrade =

Colombian footballer (1950–2025)

Personal information
- Full name: Adolfo José Andrade Chaparro
- Date of birth: 5 January 1950
- Place of birth: Tuluá, Colombia
- Date of death: 31 May 2025 (aged 75)
- Place of death: Cali, Colombia
- Position: Midfielder

Senior career*
Years	Team	Apps	(Gls)
1970–1971	Deportes Quindío	52	(7)
1972–1974	Deportivo Cali	72	(6)
1975	Deportivo Pereira	16	(1)
1976–1978	Deportes Quindío	45	(5)
1979	Deportes Tolima	20	(2)
1980	Once Caldas	29	(2)
1981–1982	Deportes Quindío	39	(6)
Total		273	(29)

International career
1971–1972	Colombia amateur	9	(4)
1972–1973	Colombia	11	(0)
- * Club domestic league appearances and goals

Adolfo José Andrade Chaparro (5 January 1950 – 31 May 2025) was a Colombian footballer who played as a forward. He was the father of the footballer Andrés Andrade.

== Club career ==
Andrade was born on 5 January 1950 in Tuluá, Valle del Cauca, near to Cali. Andrade played seven seasons for Deportes Quindío and three seasons for Deportivo Cali, with which he won the 1974 Campeonato Profesional. He also played in Deportivo Pereira, Deportes Tolima and Once Caldas, teams with which he was less successful.

== International career ==
Andrade made his debut for the Colombia national team on 26 November 1971 in the 2–1 win against Uruguay, at the 1972 Summer Olympics Qualifying Stage, where he scored the first goal of the match. In the second match, against Venezuela, he scored two goals (the match ended 2–0). He was the goalscorer of the Qualifying Stage with 4 goals in 7 games.

Andrade also played at the Brazil Independence Cup, playing as a starter only in the match against Africa Selection. He was called for the 1974 FIFA World Cup qualification, where he played two matches (both against Uruguay).

== Death ==
Andrade died in Cali on 31 May 2025, at the age of 75.

== Career statistics ==
=== Club ===
Appearances and goals by club, season and competition
Club	Season	League		
Club	Season	Division	Apps	Goals
Deportes Quindío	1970	Campeonato Profesional	17	0
Deportes Quindío	1971	Campeonato Profesional	35	7
Deportes Quindío	Total		52	7
Deportivo Cali	1972	Campeonato Profesional	33	3
Deportivo Cali	1973	Campeonato Profesional	20	3
Deportivo Cali	1974	Campeonato Profesional	19	0
Deportivo Cali	Total		72	6
Deportivo Pereira	1975	Campeonato Profesional	16	1
Deportes Quindío	1976	Campeonato Profesional	27	2
Deportes Quindío	1977	Campeonato Profesional	0	0
Deportes Quindío	1978	Campeonato Profesional	18	3
Deportes Quindío	Total		45	5
Deportes Tolima	1979	Campeonato Profesional	20	2
Once Caldas	1980	Campeonato Profesional	29	2
Deportes Quindío	1981	Campeonato Profesional	28	3
Deportes Quindío	1982	Campeonato Profesional	11	3
Deportes Quindío	Total		38	6
Career total			273	29

=== International ===
Appearances and goals by national team and year
National team	Year	Apps	Goals
Colombia amateur	1971	7	4
Colombia amateur	1972	2	0
Colombia	1972	5	0
Colombia	1973	6	0
Total		20	4

Scores and results list Colombia's goal tally first, score column indicates score after each Andrade goal.

List of international goals scored by Adolfo Andrade
No.	Date	Venue	Opponent	Score	Result	Competition
1	1971-11-26	El Campín, Bogotá, Colombia	Uruguay	1–0	2–1	1972 Summer Olympics qualifying
2	1971-11-28	El Campín, Bogotá, Colombia	Venezuela	1–0	2–0	1972 Summer Olympics qualifying
3	1971-11-28	El Campín, Bogotá, Colombia	Venezuela	2–0	2–0	1972 Summer Olympics qualifying
4	1971-12-11	El Campín, Bogotá, Colombia	Argentina	1–0	1–1	1972 Summer Olympics qualifying

== Honours ==
Deportivo Cali

- Primera A: 1974; runner-up 1972
