= 1992 Categoría Primera A season =

Copa Mustang
- Season: 1992
- Champions: América de Cali (8th title)
- Relegated: Real Cartagena
- Copa Libertadores: América de Cali; Atlético Nacional
- Matches: 404
- Goals: 946 (2.34 per match)
- Top goalscorer: John Jairo Tréllez (25)

The 1992 Copa Mustang was the forty-fifth season of Colombia's top-flight football league. América de Cali won the league for the eighth time after winning the final quadrangular ahead of the defending champions Atlético Nacional, crosstown rivals Deportivo Cali, and Junior.

Real Cartagena, who competed in the tournament for the second time after their prior appearance in 1971, became the first team to be relegated to Categoría Primera B after placing last in the aggregate table at the end of the season.

== Format ==
The season was split into four parts: Torneo Apertura, Torneo Finalización, semifinal quadrangulars, and final quadrangular. In the Torneo Apertura, the 16 participating teams were divided into two groups of eight, in which teams played on a round-robin fashion for a total of 16 matches, while in the Torneo Finalización, the 16 teams played each other twice in a double round-robin tournament for a total of 30 matches. The results of both the Apertura and the Finalización were combined into an aggregate table (Reclasificación), with the top eight teams in that table at the end of the season's 46 rounds advancing to the semifinal quadrangulars. Bonus points for the final stages (semifinal and final quadrangulars) were awarded at the end of the Apertura and Finalización tournaments to the top two teams in each Apertura group and the top four teams of the Finalización tournament, with the following scale being used: 1.00, 0.75, 0.50, and 0.25.

In the semifinal quadrangulars, the eight participating teams were divided into two groups of four in which they played each of their group rivals twice, with the top two teams of each group advancing to the final quadrangular, in which they again played their other group rivals twice. The team that topped the final quadrangular was the champion.

The promotion and relegation regime was fully implemented starting from this season, as the Categoría Primera B champion started participating in the top flight and the bottom-placed team in Primera A was relegated to the second tier, being replaced for the following season by the Primera B champion.

== Teams ==
Locations of the 1992 Categoría Primera A teams

Sixteen teams took part in the season, fourteen of them coming from the previous edition. Envigado participated in the tournament for the first time after becoming the first team to be promoted from the second tier by winning the 1991 Primera B competition, and Real Cartagena (who had competed previously in 1971 with Atlético Bucaramanga's license) returned to the competition, this time replacing Sporting de Barranquilla who went bankrupt and sold their Dimayor license.

Team	City	Stadium
América de Cali	Cali	Olímpico Pascual Guerrero
Atlético Bucaramanga	Bucaramanga	Alfonso López
Atlético Nacional	Medellín	Atanasio Girardot
Cúcuta Deportivo	Cúcuta	General Santander
Deportes Quindío	Armenia	Centenario
Deportes Tolima	Ibagué	Manuel Murillo Toro
Deportivo Cali	Cali	Olímpico Pascual Guerrero
Deportivo Pereira	Pereira	Hernán Ramírez Villegas
Envigado	Envigado	Polideportivo Sur
Independiente Medellín	Medellín	Atanasio Girardot
Junior	Barranquilla	Metropolitano Roberto Meléndez
Millonarios	Bogotá	El Campín
Once Caldas	Manizales	Fernando Londoño Londoño
Real Cartagena	Cartagena	Pedro de Heredia
Santa Fe	Bogotá	El Campín
Unión Magdalena	Santa Marta	Eduardo Santos

== Torneo Apertura ==
=== Group A ===
Pos	Team	Pld	W	D	L	GF	GA	GD	Pts	Bonus
1	Deportivo Cali	16	9	7	0	21	9	+12	25	+1.00 points
2	Atlético Nacional	16	6	6	4	18	11	+7	18	+0.25 points
3	Envigado	16	4	10	2	18	17	+1	18	
4	Millonarios	16	6	5	5	20	20	0	17	
5	Junior	16	4	8	4	20	19	+1	16	
6	Cúcuta Deportivo	16	4	4	8	19	26	−7	12	
7	Deportivo Pereira	16	2	8	6	9	16	−7	12	
8	Deportes Tolima	16	2	6	8	9	18	−9	10	

Source: RSSSF

=== Group B ===
Pos	Team	Pld	W	D	L	GF	GA	GD	Pts	Bonus
1	Santa Fe	16	8	3	5	26	18	+8	19	+0.75 points
2	Unión Magdalena	16	7	5	4	29	18	+11	19	+0.50 points
3	Atlético Bucaramanga	16	7	5	4	17	14	+3	19	
4	Once Caldas	16	4	9	3	15	15	0	17	
5	América de Cali	16	4	8	4	11	15	−4	16	
6	Independiente Medellín	16	5	4	7	14	14	0	14	
7	Deportes Quindío	16	3	8	5	15	17	−2	14	
8	Real Cartagena	16	2	6	8	9	23	−14	10	

Source: RSSSF

== Torneo Finalización ==
Pos	Team	Pld	W	D	L	GF	GA	GD	Pts	Bonus
1	América de Cali	30	15	11	4	50	27	+23	41	+1.00 points
2	Junior	30	16	6	8	56	35	+21	38	+0.75 points
3	Atlético Nacional	30	14	9	7	48	30	+18	37	+0.50 points
4	Millonarios	30	12	12	6	34	27	+7	36	+0.25 points
5	Deportivo Pereira	30	12	10	8	40	33	+7	34	
6	Santa Fe	30	12	10	8	38	31	+7	34	
7	Deportivo Cali	30	12	7	11	38	29	+9	31	
8	Unión Magdalena	30	10	10	10	35	42	−7	30	
9	Atlético Bucaramanga	30	10	10	10	24	32	−8	30	
10	Envigado	30	9	10	11	35	34	+1	28	
11	Deportes Quindío	30	9	10	11	31	40	−9	28	
12	Once Caldas	30	9	9	12	22	26	−4	27	
13	Deportes Tolima	30	7	9	14	36	52	−16	23	
14	Cúcuta Deportivo	30	5	13	12	29	41	−12	23	
15	Independiente Medellín	30	8	5	17	30	40	−10	21	
16	Real Cartagena	30	4	11	15	17	44	−27	19	

Source: RSSSF

== Aggregate table ==
An aggregate table known as Reclasificación including the games of both tournaments (Apertura and Finalización) was used to determine the teams that would advance to the Copa Mustang final stages, as well as the team that was relegated to Categoría Primera B at the end of the season.

Pos	Team	Pld	W	D	L	GF	GA	GD	Pts	Qualification or relegation
1	América de Cali	46	19	19	8	61	42	+19	57	Advance to the Final stages
2	Deportivo Cali	46	21	14	11	59	38	+21	56	Advance to the Final stages
3	Atlético Nacional	46	20	15	11	66	41	+25	55	Advance to the Final stages
4	Junior	46	20	14	12	76	54	+22	54	Advance to the Final stages
5	Santa Fe	46	20	13	13	64	49	+15	53	Advance to the Final stages
6	Millonarios	46	18	17	11	54	47	+7	53	Advance to the Final stages
7	Unión Magdalena	46	17	15	14	64	60	+4	49	Advance to the Final stages
8	Atlético Bucaramanga	46	17	15	14	41	46	−5	49	Advance to the Final stages
9	Deportivo Pereira	46	14	18	14	49	49	0	46	
10	Envigado	46	13	20	13	53	51	+2	46	
11	Once Caldas	46	13	18	15	37	41	−4	44	
12	Deportes Quindío	46	12	18	16	46	57	−11	42	
13	Independiente Medellín	46	13	9	24	44	54	−10	35	
14	Cúcuta Deportivo	46	9	17	20	48	67	−19	35	
15	Deportes Tolima	46	9	15	22	45	70	−25	33	
16	Real Cartagena (R)	46	6	17	23	26	67	−41	29	Relegation to Categoría Primera B

Source: RSSSF
(R) Relegated

== Final stages ==
=== Semifinal quadrangulars ===
==== Group A ====
Pos	Team	Pld	W	D	L	GF	GA	GD	Pts	Qualification
1	América de Cali	6	2	4	0	15	11	+4	9 (Note: Season bonus: 1.00 points)	Advance to Final quadrangular
2	Atlético Nacional	6	2	3	1	11	9	+2	7.75 (Note: Season bonus: 0.75 points)	Advance to Final quadrangular
3	Santa Fe	6	2	1	3	12	12	0	5.75 (Note: Season bonus: 0.75 points)	
4	Unión Magdalena	6	1	2	3	12	18	−6	4.5 (Note: Season bonus: 0.50 points)	

Source: RSSSF

==== Group B ====
Pos	Team	Pld	W	D	L	GF	GA	GD	Pts	Qualification
1	Deportivo Cali	6	4	0	2	7	5	+2	9 (Note: Season bonus: 1.00 points)	Advance to Final quadrangular
2	Junior	6	3	2	1	10	6	+4	8.75 (Note: Season bonus: 0.75 points)	Advance to Final quadrangular
3	Atlético Bucaramanga	6	2	1	3	8	12	−4	5	
4	Millonarios	6	1	1	4	7	9	−2	3.25 (Note: Season bonus: 0.25 points)	

Source: RSSSF

=== Final quadrangular ===
Pos	Team	Pld	W	D	L	GF	GA	GD	Pts	Qualification
1	América de Cali (C)	6	4	1	1	11	6	+5	10	Qualification for Copa Libertadores
2	Atlético Nacional	6	3	2	1	11	8	+3	8.75	Qualification for Copa Libertadores
3	Deportivo Cali	6	3	1	2	6	6	0	8	Qualification for Copa CONMEBOL (Note: Although Deportivo Cali were expected to play the 1993 Copa CONMEBOL after finishing third in the final quadrangular, the Colombian Football Federation did not enter the tournament.)
4	Junior	6	0	0	6	3	11	−8	0.75	

Source: RSSSF
(C) Champions

== Top goalscorers ==
Rank	Player	Club	Goals
1	(Colombia) John Jairo Tréllez	Atlético Nacional	25
2	(Colombia) Rubén Darío Hernández	Envigado	20
3	(Uruguay) Jorge da Silva	América de Cali	19
3	(Colombia) Adolfo Valencia	Santa Fe	19
5	(Colombia) Víctor Aristizábal	Atlético Nacional	18
6	(Colombia) Armando Osma	Deportes Tolima	17
7	(Colombia) Antony de Ávila	América de Cali	16
7	(Colombia) Freddy Rincón	América de Cali	16
9	(Colombia) Manuel Acisclo Córdoba	Santa Fe	15
9	(Colombia) Teddy Orozco	Unión Magdalena	15

Source: Historia del Fútbol Profesional Colombiano 70 Años
