= 1975 Campeonato Profesional =

Campeonato Profesional
- Season: 1975
- Champions: Santa Fe (6th title)
- Matches: 359
- Goals: 885 (2.47 per match)
- Top goalscorer: Jorge Ramón Cáceres (35)

The 1975 Campeonato Profesional was the twenty-eighth season of Colombia's top-flight football league. Santa Fe won the league for the sixth time after winning the Hexagonal final.

== Teams ==
| Team | City | Stadium |
|---|---|---|
| América | Cali | Olímpico Pascual Guerrero |
| Atlético Bucaramanga | Bucaramanga | Alfonso López |
| Atlético Nacional | Medellín | Atanasio Girardot |
| Cúcuta Deportivo | Cúcuta | General Santander |
| Deportes Quindío | Armenia | San José de Armenia |
| Deportes Tolima | Ibagué | Gustavo Rojas Pinilla |
| Deportivo Cali | Cali | Olímpico Pascual Guerrero |
| Deportivo Pereira | Pereira | Hernán Ramírez Villegas |
| Independiente Medellín | Medellín | Atanasio Girardot |
| Junior | Barranquilla | Romelio Martínez |
| Millonarios | Bogotá | El Campín |
| Once Caldas | Manizales | Palogrande |
| Santa Fe | Bogotá | El Campín |
| Unión Magdalena | Santa Marta | Eduardo Santos |

== Opening Tournament ==
=== Standings ===
| Pos. | Team | Pts | Pld | W | D | L | GF | GA | GD | Qualification |
|---|---|---|---|---|---|---|---|---|---|---|
| 1 | Millonarios | 41 | 26 | 18 | 5 | 3 | 48 | 22 | 26 | Group A and Final Hexagonal |
| 2 | Cali | 38 | 26 | 16 | 6 | 4 | 47 | 21 | 26 | Group A and Final Hexagonal |
| 3 | Santa Fe | 34 | 26 | 12 | 10 | 4 | 32 | 18 | 14 | Group A |
| 4 | Junior | 32 | 26 | 12 | 8 | 6 | 40 | 24 | 16 | Group A |
| 5 | Medellín | 29 | 26 | 10 | 9 | 7 | 38 | 32 | 6 | Group A |
| 6 | Magdalena | 28 | 26 | 10 | 8 | 8 | 30 | 30 | 0 | Group A |
| 7 | Pereira | 27 | 26 | 10 | 7 | 9 | 39 | 39 | 0 | Group A |
| 8 | Quindío | 24 | 26 | 8 | 8 | 10 | 26 | 30 | -4 | Group B |
| 9 | Bucaramanga | 24 | 26 | 8 | 8 | 10 | 34 | 39 | -5 | Group B |
| 10 | Tolima | 22 | 26 | 7 | 8 | 11 | 26 | 38 | -12 | Group B |
| 11 | América | 21 | 26 | 9 | 3 | 14 | 29 | 33 | -4 | Group B |
| 12 | Nacional | 20 | 26 | 6 | 8 | 12 | 32 | 41 | -9 | Group B |
| 13 | Caldas | 15 | 26 | 5 | 5 | 16 | 26 | 49 | -23 | Group B |
| 14 | Cúcuta | 9 | 26 | 1 | 7 | 18 | 15 | 46 | -31 | Group B |

=== Results ===
| _{Home}\^{Away} | AME | BUC | CAL | CUC | JUN | MAG | DIM | MIL | NAC | ONC | PER | QUI | SFE | TOL |
|---|---|---|---|---|---|---|---|---|---|---|---|---|---|---|
| América | — | 3–1 | 2–0 | 3–0 | 1–2 | 2–0 | 0–0 | 1–2 | 2–1 | 1–0 | 2–1 | 0–1 | 0–1 | 1–1 |
| Bucaramanga | 3–2 | — | 0–2 | 0–0 | 5–3 | 2–2 | 0–0 | 0–0 | 2–1 | 3–0 | 0–1 | 1–1 | 1–1 | 2–1 |
| Cali | 1–0 | 3–0 | — | 3–0 | 3–1 | 2–1 | 3–0 | 2–2 | 4–1 | 3–0 | 2–1 | 1–1 | 0–0 | 3–1 |
| Cúcuta | 1–2 | 0–1 | 0–2 | — | 1–1 | 2–3 | 1–1 | 1–3 | 1–2 | 0–0 | 1–2 | 1–2 | 2–0 | 1–1 |
| Junior | 4–1 | 1–1 | 1–0 | 2–0 | — | 0–0 | 3–1 | 0–1 | 4–0 | 4–1 | 2–1 | 2–0 | 0–0 | 4–1 |
| Magdalena | 2–0 | 0–2 | 3–1 | 0–0 | 0–1 | — | 1–1 | 1–0 | 1–0 | 3–0 | 1–2 | 3–1 | 1–1 | 1–0 |
| Medellín | 0–1 | 5–2 | 1–2 | 4–0 | 1–1 | 0–1 | — | 2–1 | 0–0 | 2–1 | 1–3 | 2–1 | 1–1 | 3–0 |
| Millonarios | 1–0 | 4–3 | 3–0 | 4–0 | 1–0 | 2–0 | 3–0 | — | 1–0 | 2–1 | 3–2 | 2–0 | 2–1 | 1–1 |
| Nacional | 1–0 | 2–1 | 1–3 | 1–1 | 0–2 | 1–2 | 3–3 | 2–2 | — | 4–1 | 5–2 | 1–2 | 2–2 | 0–1 |
| Caldas | 4–2 | 2–1 | 1–4 | 1–0 | 1–1 | 2–0 | 1–2 | 0–2 | 0–0 | — | 1–2 | 2–3 | 0–0 | 2–1 |
| Pereira | 1–1 | 1–2 | 1–1 | 3–0 | 1–1 | 1–1 | 1–3 | 2–1 | 1–1 | 2–1 | — | 1–0 | 2–3 | 3–1 |
| Quindío | 1–0 | 2–0 | 0–0 | 2–1 | 0–0 | 2–2 | 1–2 | 1–2 | 2–1 | 0–0 | 2–2 | — | 0–1 | 1–1 |
| Santa Fe | 2–1 | 1–0 | 0–0 | 1–0 | 2–0 | 4–0 | 1–1 | 0–1 | 1–1 | 3–1 | 3–0 | 1–0 | — | 2–1 |
| Tolima | 2–1 | 1–1 | 0–2 | 2–1 | 1–0 | 1–1 | 0–2 | 2–2 | 0–1 | 4–3 | 0–0 | 1–0 | 1–0 | — |

=== First round results ===
Matchday 01 (february 16/1975)
| Local Team | Result | Visiting Team |
| América | 1 – 1 | Tolima |
| Santa Fe | 1 – 1 | Nacional |
| Junior | 2 – 1 | Pereira |
| Caldas | 2 – 0 | Magdalena |
| Quindío | 2 – 1 | Cúcuta |
| Medellín | 2 – 1 | Millonarios |
| Bucaramanga | 0 – 2 | Cali |

Matchday 02 (February 19/1975)
| Local Team | Result | Visiting Team |
| Millonarios | 2 – 1 | Caldas |
| Nacional | 1 – 0 | América |
| Cali | 1 – 1 | Quindío |
| Tolima | 1 – 1 | Bucaramanga |
| Pereira | 2 – 3 | Santa Fe |
| Magdalena | 0 – 1 | Junior |
| Cúcuta | 1 – 1 | Medellín |

Matchday 03 (March 02/1975)
| Local Team | Result | Visiting Team |
| Medellín | 1 – 2 | Cali |
| Caldas | 1 – 0 | Cúcuta |
| Junior | 0 – 1 | Millonarios |
| Tolima | 0 – 1 | Nacional |
| Santa Fe | 4 – 0 | Magdalena |
| Bucaramanga | 1 – 1 | Quindío |
| América | 2 – 1 | Pereira |

Matchday 04 (March 06/1975)
| Local Team | Result | Visiting Team |
| Magdalena | 2 – 0 | América |
| Millonarios | 2 – 1 | Santa Fe |
| Nacional | 2 – 1 | Bucaramanga |
| Cúcuta | 1 – 1 | Junior |
| Cali | 3 – 0 | Caldas |
| Pereira | 3 – 1 | Tolima |
| Quindío | 1 – 2 | Medellín |

Matchday 05 (March 16/1975)
| Local Team | Result | Visiting Team |
| Caldas | 2 – 3 | Quindío |
| Tolima | 1 – 1 | Magdalena |
| Junior | 1 – 0 | Cali |
| Bucaramanga | 0 – 0 | Medellín |
| Santa Fe | 1 – 0 | Cúcuta |
| Nacional | 5 – 2 | Pereira |
| América | 1 – 2 | Millonarios |

Matchday 06 (March 19/1975)
| Local Team | Result | Visiting Team |
| Magdalena | 1 – 0 | Nacional |
| Cali | 0 – 0 | Santa Fe |
| Medellín | 2 – 1 | Caldas |
| Pereira | 1 – 0 | Bucaramanga |
| Millonarios | 1 – 1 | Tolima |
| Cúcuta | 1 – 2 | América |
| Quindío | 0 – 0 | Junior |

Matchday 07 (March 30/1975)
| Local Team | Result | Visiting Team |
| Nacional | 2 – 2 | Millonarios |
| Pereira | 1 – 1 | Magdalena |
| Tolima | 2 – 1 | Cúcuta |
| América | 2 – 0 | Cali |
| Santa Fe | 1 – 0 | Quindío |
| Bucaramanga | 3 – 0 | Caldas |
| Junior | 3 – 1 | Medellín |

Matchday 08 (April 06/1975)
| Local Team | Result | Visiting Team |
| Millonarios | 1 – 1 | Pereira |
| Caldas | 1 – 0 | Junior |
| Quindío | 0 – 1 | América |
| Medellín | 3 – 1 | Santa Fe |
| Magdalena | 1 – 0 | Bucaramanga |
| Cúcuta | 1 – 1 | Nacional |
| Cali | 1 – 2 | Tolima |

Matchday 09 (April 10/1975)
| Local Team | Result | Visiting Team |
| América | 0 – 0 | Medellín |
| Santa Fe | 3 – 1 | Caldas |
| Magdalena | 1 – 0 | Millonarios |
| Pereira | 3 – 0 | Cúcuta |
| Nacional | 1 – 3 | Cali |
| Tolima | 1 – 0 | Quindío |
| Bucaramanga | 5 – 3 | Junior |

Matchday 10 (April 13/1975)
| Local Team | Result | Visiting Team |
| Quindío | 2 – 1 | Nacional |
| Caldas | 4 – 2 | América |
| Millonarios | 4 – 3 | Bucaramanga |
| Junior | 0 – 0 | Santa Fe |
| Medellín | 3 – 0 | Tolima |
| Cúcuta | 2 – 3 | Magdalena |
| Cali | 2 – 1 | Pereira |

Matchday 11 (April 20/1975)
| Local Team | Result | Visiting Team |
| Bucaramanga | 1 – 1 | Santa Fe |
| América | 1 – 2 | Junior |
| Millonarios | 4 – 0 | Cúcuta |
| Medellín | 3 – 3 | Nacional |
| Tolima | 4 – 3 | Caldas |
| Pereira | 1 – 0 | Quindío |
| Magdalena | 3 – 1 | Cali |

Matchday 12 (April 27/1975)
| Local Team | Result | Visiting Team |
| Cali | 2 – 2 | Millonarios |
| Bucaramanga | 0 – 0 | Cúcuta |
| Medellín | 1 – 3 | Pereira |
| Quindío | 2 – 2 | Magdalena |
| Caldas | 0 – 0 | Nacional |
| Santa Fe | 2 – 1 | América |
| Junior | 4 – 1 | Tolima |

Matchday 13 (May 04/1975)
| Local Team | Result | Visiting Team |
| Tolima | 1 – 0 | Santa Fe |
| Cúcuta | 0 – 2 | Cali |
| América | 3 – 1 | Bucaramanga |
| Pereira | 2 – 1 | Caldas |
| Millonarios | 2 – 0 | Quindío |
| Nacional | 0 – 2 | Junior |
| Magdalena | 1 – 1 | Medellín |

=== Second round results ===
Matchday 14 (May 08/1975)
| Local Team | Result | Visiting Team |
| Tolima | 2 – 1 | América |
| Nacional | 2 – 2 | Santa Fe |
| Pereira | 1 – 1 | Junior |
| Magdalena | 3 – 0 | Caldas |
| Cúcuta | 1 – 2 | Quindío |
| Millonarios | 3 – 0 | Medellín |
| Cali | 3 – 0 | Bucaramanga |

Matchday 15 (May 11/1975)
| Local Team | Result | Visiting Team |
| Caldas | 0 – 2 | Millonarios |
| América | 2 – 1 | Nacional |
| Quindío | 0 – 0 | Cali |
| Bucaramanga | 2 – 1 | Tolima |
| Santa Fe | 2 – 1 | Pereira |
| Junior | 0 – 0 | Magdalena |
| Medellín | 4 – 0 | Cúcuta |

Matchday 16 (May 16/1975)
| Local Team | Result | Visiting Team |
| Cali | 3 – 0 | Medellín |
| Cúcuta | 0 – 0 | Caldas |
| Millonarios | 1 – 0 | Junior |
| Nacional | 0 – 1 | Tolima |
| Magdalena | 1 – 1 | Santa Fe |
| Quindío | 2 – 0 | Bucaramanga |
| Pereira | 1 – 1 | América |

Matchday 17 (May 25/1975)
| Local Team | Result | Visiting Team |
| América | 2 – 0 | Magdalena |
| Santa Fe | 0 – 1 | Millonarios |
| Bucaramanga | 2 – 1 | Nacional |
| Junior | 2 – 0 | Cúcuta |
| Caldas | 1 – 4 | Cali |
| Tolima | 0 – 0 | Pereira |
| Medellín | 2 – 1 | Quindío |

Matchday 18 (May 29/1975)
| Local Team | Result | Visiting Team |
| Quindío | 0 – 0 | Caldas |
| Magdalena | 1 – 0 | Tolima |
| Cali | 3 – 1 | Junior |
| Medellín | 5 – 2 | Bucaramanga |
| Cúcuta | 2 – 0 | Santa Fe |
| Pereira | 1 – 1 | Nacional |
| Millonarios | 1 – 0 | América |

Matchday 19 (June 01/1975)
| Local Team | Result | Visiting Team |
| Nacional | 1 – 2 | Magdalena |
| Santa Fe | 0 – 0 | Cali |
| Caldas | 1 – 2 | Medellín |
| Bucaramanga | 0 – 1 | Pereira |
| Tolima | 2 – 2 | Millonarios |
| América | 3 – 0 | Cúcuta |
| Junior | 2 – 0 | Quindío |

Matchday 20 (June 08/1975)
| Local Team | Result | Visiting Team |
| Millonarios | 1 – 0 | Nacional |
| Magdalena | 1 – 2 | Pereira |
| Cúcuta | 1 – 1 | Tolima |
| Cali | 1 – 0 | América |
| Quindío | 0 – 1 | Santa Fe |
| Caldas | 2 – 1 | Bucaramanga |
| Medellín | 1 – 1 | Junior |

Matchday 21 (June 15/1975)
| Local Team | Result | Visiting Team |
| Pereira | 2 – 1 | Millonarios |
| Junior | 4 – 1 | Caldas |
| América | 0 – 1 | Quindío |
| Santa Fe | 1 – 1 | Medellín |
| Bucaramanga | 2 – 2 | Magdalena |
| Nacional | 1 – 1 | Cúcuta |
| Tolima | 0 – 2 | Cali |

Matchday 22 (June 22/1975)
| Local Team | Result | Visiting Team |
| Medellín | 0 – 1 | América |
| Caldas | 0 – 0 | Santa Fe |
| Millonarios | 2 – 0 | Magdalena |
| Cúcuta | 1 – 2 | Pereira |
| Cali | 4 – 1 | Nacional |
| Quindío | 1 – 1 | Tolima |
| Junior | 1 – 1 | Bucaramanga |

Matchday 23 (June 26/1975)
| Local Team | Result | Visiting Team |
| Nacional | 1 – 2 | Quindío |
| América | 1 – 0 | Caldas |
| Bucaramanga | 0 – 0 | Millonarios |
| Santa Fe | 2 – 0 | Junior |
| Tolima | 0 – 2 | Medellín |
| Magdalena | 0 – 0 | Cúcuta |
| Pereira | 1 – 1 | Cali |

Matchday 24 (June 29/1975)
| Local Team | Result | Visiting Team |
| Santa Fe | 1 – 0 | Bucaramanga |
| Junior | 4 – 1 | América |
| Cúcuta | 1 – 3 | Millonarios |
| Nacional | 0 – 0 | Medellín |
| Caldas | 2 – 1 | Tolima |
| Quindío | 2 – 2 | Pereira |
| Cali | 2 – 1 | Magdalena |

Matchday 25 (July 02/1975)
| Local Team | Result | Visiting Team |
| Millonarios | 3 – 0 | Cali |
| Cúcuta | 0 – 1 | Bucaramanga |
| Pereira | 1 – 3 | Medellín |
| Magdalena | 3 – 1 | Quindío |
| Nacional | 4 – 1 | Caldas |
| América | 0 – 1 | Santa Fe |
| Tolima | 1 – 0 | Junior |

Matchday 26 (July 06/1975)
| Local Team | Result | Visiting Team |
| Santa Fe | 2 – 1 | Tolima |
| Cali | 3 – 0 | Cúcuta |
| Bucaramanga | 3 – 2 | América |
| Caldas | 1 – 2 | Pereira |
| Quindío | 1 – 2 | Millonarios |
| Junior | 4 – 0 | Nacional |
| Medellín | 0 – 1 | Magdalena |

== Closing Tournament ==
=== Standings ===
| Pos. | Team | Pts | Pld | W | D | L | GF | GA | GD | Qualification |
|---|---|---|---|---|---|---|---|---|---|---|
| 1 | Santa Fe | 26 | 21 | 10 | 6 | 5 | 28 | 18 | 10 | Hexagonal final. |
| 2 | Millonarios | 25 | 21 | 9 | 7 | 5 | 25 | 20 | 5 |
| 3 | Junior | 22 | 21 | 6 | 10 | 5 | 27 | 26 | 1 |
| 4 | Cali | 21 | 21 | 7 | 7 | 7 | 35 | 33 | 2 |
| 5 | Medellín | 20 | 21 | 6 | 8 | 7 | 22 | 26 | -4 |
| 6 | Pereira | 19 | 21 | 6 | 7 | 8 | 23 | 28 | -5 |
| 7 | Magdalena | 13 | 21 | 2 | 9 | 10 | 17 | 33 | -16 |
