= 1980 Campeonato Profesional =

Campeonato Profesional
- Season: 1980
- Champions: Junior (2nd title)
- Matches: 369
- Goals: 946 (2.56 per match)
- Top goalscorer: Sergio Cierra (26)

The 1980 Campeonato Profesional was the thirty-third season of Colombia's top-flight football league. Junior won the league for the second time after winning the Cuadrangular final.

== Teams ==
| Team | City | Stadium |
|---|---|---|
| América | Cali | Olímpico Pascual Guerrero |
| Atlético Bucaramanga | Bucaramanga | Alfonso López |
| Atlético Nacional | Medellín | Atanasio Girardot |
| Cúcuta Deportivo | Cúcuta | General Santander |
| Deportes Quindío | Armenia | San José de Armenia |
| Deportes Tolima | Ibagué | Gustavo Rojas Pinilla |
| Deportivo Cali | Cali | Olímpico Pascual Guerrero |
| Deportivo Pereira | Pereira | Hernán Ramírez Villegas |
| Independiente Medellín | Medellín | Atanasio Girardot |
| Junior | Barranquilla | Romelio Martínez |
| Millonarios | Bogotá | El Campín |
| Once Caldas | Manizales | Palogrande |
| Santa Fe | Bogotá | El Campín |
| Unión Magdalena | Santa Marta | Eduardo Santos |
