= 1972 Campeonato Profesional =

Campeonato Profesional
- Season: 1972
- Champions: Millonarios (10th title)
- Matches: 376
- Goals: 845 (2.25 per match)
- Top goalscorer: Hugo Lóndero (27)

The 1972 Campeonato Profesional was the twenty-fifth season of Colombia's top-flight football league. Millonarios won the league for the tenth time after winning the Triangular final.

== Teams ==
Team	City	Stadium
América	Cali	Olímpico Pascual Guerrero
Atlético Bucaramanga	Bucaramanga	Alfonso López
Atlético Nacional	Medellín	Atanasio Girardot
Cúcuta Deportivo	Cúcuta	General Santander
Deportes Quindío	Armenia	San José de Armenia
Deportes Tolima	Ibagué	Gustavo Rojas Pinilla
Deportivo Cali	Cali	Olímpico Pascual Guerrero
Deportivo Pereira	Pereira	Hernán Ramírez Villegas
Independiente Medellín	Medellín	Atanasio Girardot
Junior	Barranquilla	Romelio Martínez
Millonarios	Bogotá	El Campín
Once Caldas	Manizales	Palogrande
Santa Fe	Bogotá	El Campín
Unión Magdalena	Santa Marta	Eduardo Santos

== Opening Tournament ==
=== Standings ===
Pos	Team	Pld	W	D	L	GF	GA	GD	Pts	Qualification or relegation
1	Millonarios F.C.	26	15	8	3	43	21	+22	38	Final Triangular
2	Atlético Junior	26	13	10	3	37	20	+17	36	Final Triangular
3	Independiente Santa Fe	26	11	9	6	28	15	+13	31	
4	Deportivo Cali	26	11	8	7	39	27	+12	30	
5	Atlético Nacional	26	13	4	9	33	32	+1	30	
6	Deportivo Pereira	26	7	13	6	31	31	0	27	
7	Deportes Tolima	26	6	14	6	29	32	−3	26	
8	Deportes Quindío	26	8	9	9	39	35	+4	25	
9	Independiente Medellín	26	6	11	9	24	26	−2	23	
10	Cúcuta Deportivo	26	6	11	9	26	30	−4	23	
11	Atlético Bucaramanga	26	7	7	12	27	33	−6	21	
12	Unión Magdalena	26	4	10	12	18	32	−14	18	
13	Once Caldas	26	5	8	13	24	42	−18	18	
14	América de Cali	26	5	8	13	17	39	−22	18	

Source: RSSSF

=== Results ===
_{Home}\^{Away}	AME	BUC	CAL	CUC	JUN	MAG	DIM	MIL	NAC	ONC	PER	QUI	SFE	TOL
América	—	1–0	1–1	1–1	0–1	0–0	1–0	0–2	2–1	1–0	0–1	2–1	1–3	0–3
Bucaramanga	0–0	—	0–2	2–1	0–0	0–0	3–0	2–3	1–0	1–1	3–2	2–0	1–0	3–0
Cali	2–1	2–0	—	2–1	1–2	1–1	3–0	1–1	4–0	3–0	4–1	2–1	1–1	2–1
Cúcuta	3–0	1–0	1–1	—	0–0	1–1	1–2	0–1	3–2	2–0	0–0	0–0	0–0	1–0
Junior	2–0	1–0	2–0	1–0	—	0–0	1–0	3–4	0–1	2–1	5–1	2–1	1–0	2–2
Magdalena	0–0	1–0	3–2	2–2	0–3	—	1–0	0–3	2–2	1–0	1–1	0–1	1–1	2–3
Medellín	4–0	1–1	1–2	2–3	0–0	2–0	—	1–2	0–0	2–0	1–1	2–2	1–1	0–0
Millonarios	2–2	3–3	2–0	1–0	0–0	1–0	0–0	—	2–0	3–1	1–1	0–0	1–2	1–0
Nacional	2–0	1–0	1–0	1–1	1–0	1–0	0–1	0–1	—	3–1	2–0	2–0	1–0	1–1
Caldas	1–0	2–1	2–1	2–2	2–2	1–0	1–0	1–1	2–3	—	1–1	1–1	0–2	0–0
Pereira	3–0	2–1	1–1	1–1	1–1	1–0	0–0	2–0	2–3	4–1	—	1–1	1–0	0–0
Quindío	5–3	5–0	3–1	1–0	2–2	3–1	1–2	1–4	5–1	3–2	1–1	—	0–0	0–0
Santa Fe	0–0	1–0	0–0	4–0	0–1	2–1	1–1	1–0	1–2	2–0	2–1	2–0	—	2–0
Tolima	1–1	3–3	0–0	3–1	3–3	1–0	1–1	0–4	3–2	1–1	1–1	2–1	0–0	—

== Ending Tournament ==
=== Standings ===
Pos	Team	Pld	W	D	L	GF	GA	GD	Pts	Qualification or relegation
1	Deportivo Cali	26	16	4	6	49	27	+22	36	Tiebreaker for qualification to the final quadrangular
2	Millonarios F.C.	26	17	2	7	39	20	+19	36	Tiebreaker for qualification to the final quadrangular
3	Atlético Nacional	26	14	8	4	34	20	+14	36	Tiebreaker for qualification to the final quadrangular
4	Cúcuta Deportivo	26	9	11	6	38	32	+6	29	
5	Atlético Junior	26	8	13	5	29	30	−1	29	
6	Independiente Santa Fe	26	7	12	7	39	39	0	26	
7	América de Cali	26	8	9	9	20	23	−3	25	
8	Once Caldas	26	8	8	10	29	31	−2	24	
9	Deportes Tolima	26	7	10	9	19	23	−4	24	
10	Deportivo Pereira	26	5	12	9	32	35	−3	22	
11	Deportes Quindío	26	5	12	9	21	30	−9	22	
12	Independiente Medellín	26	7	7	12	18	24	−6	21	
13	Atlético Bucaramanga	26	3	12	11	20	34	−14	18	
14	Unión Magdalena	26	4	8	14	20	39	−19	16	

Source: RSSSF

=== Results ===
_{Home}\^{Away}	AME	BUC	CAL	CUC	JUN	MAG	DIM	MIL	NAC	ONC	PER	QUI	SFE	TOL
América	—	1–1	0–0	1–2	0–0	1–0	1–0	0–1	1–4	2–1	1–0	0–0	1–1	2–1
Bucaramanga	0–1	—	1–3	1–1	2–1	0–0	1–2	0–1	1–0	0–0	0–0	0–0	3–3	0–1
Cali	1–0	3–1	—	3–1	4–1	2–0	3–1	2–3	2–3	2–0	2–2	2–2	3–1	2–1
Cúcuta	1–1	3–1	1–1	—	4–0	1–1	1–0	2–1	1–0	3–1	1–1	0–1	1–1	5–1
Junior	1–0	1–1	2–1	1–0	—	2–1	2–1	1–1	0–0	3–2	3–3	2–0	2–0	0–2
Magdalena	0–0	2–0	0–2	0–0	1–1	—	0–1	1–0	2–2	1–4	3–2	3–1	1–2	1–1
Medellín	2–0	0–0	1–2	0–1	0–0	0–0	—	1–2	0–0	0–1	0–0	1–0	1–1	1–0
Millonarios	3–1	2–1	0–1	3–1	1–0	3–1	2–0	—	3–0	1–0	1–0	3–1	2–0	0–0
Nacional	0–0	2–1	1–3	3–0	0–0	2–1	2–1	1–0	—	2–1	1–1	1–0	2–1	0–0
Caldas	0–3	2–2	1–0	3–1	1–1	3–0	1–0	0–1	0–1	—	0–3	1–0	1–1	2–0
Pereira	1–2	4–0	1–0	2–2	2–2	1–0	0–1	2–1	0–2	0–0	—	1–3	2–5	1–1
Quindío	1–0	0–0	1–3	2–2	1–1	2–1	0–1	1–0	1–1	2–2	1–1	—	0–0	0–0
Santa Fe	1–1	1–1	2–1	2–2	1–1	3–0	2–1	2–4	0–3	2–2	2–2	4–1	—	1–0
Tolima	1–0	0–2	0–1	1–1	1–1	3–0	2–2	1–0	0–1	0–0	1–0	0–0	1–0	—

=== Standings ===
Pos	Team	Pld	W	D	L	GF	GA	GD	Pts	Qualification or relegation
1	Deportivo Cali	4	3	0	1	7	4	+3	6	Final Triangular
2	Millonarios F.C.	4	2	1	1	6	4	+2	5	Final Triangular
3	Atlético Nacional	4	0	1	3	1	6	−5	1	

Source: RSSSF

== Final Triangular ==
=== Standings ===
Pos	Team	Pld	W	D	L	GF	GA	GD	Pts	Qualification or relegation
1	Millonarios F.C.	4	1	3	0	3	2	+1	5	Champion and Libertadores Cup 1973
2	Deportivo Cali	4	1	2	1	4	2	+2	4	Second place and Libertadores Cup 1973
3	Atlético Junior	4	1	1	2	2	5	−3	3	

Source: RSSSF
