= List of football clubs in Colombia =

This is a list of football clubs in Colombia, sorted by division, then alphabetically, and including geographical provenience and home stadium.

== Categoría Primera A ==
Teams for the 2026 season

Team	City	Stadium	Capacity	Head coach	First season in Primera A	Last title
Águilas Doradas	Rionegro	Alberto Grisales	14,000	(Argentina) Flavio Robatto	2011	None
Alianza	Valledupar	Armando Maestre Pavajeau	11,000	(Colombia) Flabio Torres	2024	None
América de Cali	Cali	Pascual Guerrero	38,000	(Colombia) David González	1948	2020
Atlético Bucaramanga	Bucaramanga	Américo Montanini	28,000	(Uruguay) Pablo Peirano	1949	2024–I
Atlético Nacional	Medellín	Atanasio Girardot	44,826	(Colombia) Lucas González	1948	2024–II
Boyacá Chicó	Tunja	La Independencia	20,630	(Colombia) Jhon Jaime Gómez	2004	2008–I
Cúcuta Deportivo	Cúcuta	General Santander	42,901	(Argentina) Nicolás Chiesa	1950	2006–II
Deportes Tolima	Ibagué	Manuel Murillo Toro	28,100	(Colombia) Luis Fernando Suárez	1955	2021–I
Deportivo Cali	Cali	Deportivo Cali	42,000	(Venezuela) Rafael Dudamel	1948	2021–II
Deportivo Pasto	Pasto	Departamental Libertad	19,000	(Spain) Diego Merino	1999	2006–I
Deportivo Pereira	Pereira	Hernán Ramírez Villegas	30,297	(Colombia) Alexis Márquez	1949	2022–II
Fortaleza F.C.	Bogotá	Metropolitano de Techo	10,000	(Colombia) Diego Arias	2014	None
Independiente Medellín	Medellín	Atanasio Girardot	44,826	(Colombia) Luis Amaranto Perea	1948	2016–I
Internacional de Bogotá	Bogotá	Metropolitano de Techo	10,000	(Argentina) Ricardo Valiño	2026	None
Jaguares de Córdoba	Montería	Jaraguay	12,000	(Colombia) Julio Méndez (caretaker)	2015	None
Junior	Barranquilla	Metropolitano Roberto Meléndez	49,692	(Uruguay) Sebastián Viera	1948	2026–I
Llaneros F.C.	Villavicencio	Bello Horizonte – Rey Pelé	15,000	(Colombia) Wilmer Sandoval (caretaker)	2025	None
Millonarios	Bogotá	Nemesio Camacho	39,512	(Colombia) Alberto Gamero	1948	2023–I
Once Caldas	Manizales	Palogrande	32,000	(Colombia) Carlos Valencia (caretaker)	1948	2010–II
Santa Fe	Bogotá	Nemesio Camacho	39,512	(Uruguay) Pablo Repetto	1948	2025–I

== Categoría Primera B ==
Teams for the 2026 season

Team	City	Stadium	Capacity	Head Coach
Atlético F.C.	Cali	Pascual Guerrero	38,000	(Colombia) Andrés Sicachá
Barranquilla F.C.	Barranquilla	Romelio Martínez	11,000	(Colombia) Dayron Pérez
Boca Juniors de Cali	Cali	Pascual Guerrero	38,000	(Colombia) José Manuel Rodríguez
Bogotá F.C.	Bogotá	Metropolitano de Techo	10,000	(Colombia) Sebastián Botero
Deportes Quindío	Armenia	Centenario	21,500	(Colombia) Harold Rivera
Envigado F.C.	Envigado	Polideportivo Sur	11,000	(Colombia) Alberto Suárez
Independiente Valle del Cauca	Palmira	Francisco Rivera Escobar	15,300	(Ecuador) Nicolás Serrano
Independiente Valle del Cauca	Palmira	Deportivo Cali	42,000	(Ecuador) Nicolás Serrano
Internacional F.C. de Palmira	Palmira	Francisco Rivera Escobar	15,300	(Colombia) Nelson Flórez
Itagüí Leones F.C.	Itagüí	Metropolitano Ciudad de Itagüí	12,000	(Colombia) Alejandro Arboleda
Orsomarso S.C.	Yumbo	Municipal Raúl Miranda	3,500	(Colombia) Mauricio Arquez
Patriotas Boyacá	Tunja	La Independencia	20,630	(Colombia) Carlos Giraldo
Real Cartagena	Cartagena	Jaime Morón León	16,068	(Colombia) Álvaro Hernández
Real Cundinamarca	Mosquera	Municipal de Mosquera	5,440	(Colombia) Diego Mazo
Real Santander	Piedecuesta	Villa Concha	5,500	(Colombia) Óscar Álvarez
Tigres F.C.	Bogotá	Metropolitano de Techo	10,000	(Colombia) Rafael Rodríguez
Unión Magdalena	Santa Marta	Sierra Nevada	16,000	(Colombia) Carlos Silva

== Best results in international competitions ==
- Copa Libertadores
  - Champions (3): 1989, 2004, 2016

Season	Club	Opponent	Aggregate score
1989	Atlético Nacional	(Paraguay) Olimpia	2–2 (5–4 p)
2004	Once Caldas	(Argentina) Boca Juniors	1–1 (2–0 p)
2016	Atlético Nacional	(Ecuador) Independiente del Valle	2–1

- Copa Sudamericana
  - Champions (1): 2015

Season	Club	Opponent	Aggregate score
2015	Santa Fe	(Argentina) Huracán	0–0 (3–1 p)

- Recopa Sudamericana
  - Champions (1): 2017

Season	Club	Opponent	Aggregate score
2017	Atlético Nacional	(Brazil) Chapecoense	5–3

- Suruga Bank Championship
  - Champions (1): 2016

Season	Club	Opponent	Score
2016	Santa Fe	(Japan) Kashima Antlers	1–0

- FIFA Club World Cup
  - Third place (1): 2016

Season	Club	Opponent	Score
(Japan) 2016	Atlético Nacional	(Mexico) América	2–2 (4–3 p)

== Other ==
- La Paz FC
