= 1974 Campeonato Profesional =

Campeonato Profesional
- Season: 1974
- Champions: Deportivo Cali (5th title)
- Matches: 361
- Goals: 835 (2.31 per match)
- Top goalscorer: Víctor Ephanor (33)

The 1974 Campeonato Profesional was the twenty-seventh season of Colombia's top-flight football league. Deportivo Cali won the league for the fifth time after winning the Hexagonal final.

== Teams ==
Team	City	Stadium
América	Cali	Olímpico Pascual Guerrero
Atlético Bucaramanga	Bucaramanga	Alfonso López
Atlético Nacional	Medellín	Atanasio Girardot
Cúcuta Deportivo	Cúcuta	General Santander
Deportes Quindío	Armenia	San José de Armenia
Deportes Tolima	Ibagué	Gustavo Rojas Pinilla
Deportivo Cali	Cali	Olímpico Pascual Guerrero
Deportivo Pereira	Pereira	Hernán Ramírez Villegas
Independiente Medellín	Medellín	Atanasio Girardot
Junior	Barranquilla	Romelio Martínez
Millonarios	Bogotá	El Campín
Once Caldas	Manizales	Palogrande
Santa Fe	Bogotá	El Campín
Unión Magdalena	Santa Marta	Eduardo Santos

== Opening Tournament ==
=== Standings ===
Pos.	Team	Pts	Pld	W	D	L	GF	GA	GD	Qualification
1	Nacional	37	26	15	7	4	38	22	16	Group A, final hexagonal and tiebreaker
2	Cali	37	26	14	9	3	38	19	19	Group A, final hexagonal and tiebreaker
3	Millonarios	33	26	15	3	8	38	21	17	Group A
4	Junior	33	26	12	9	5	27	18	9	Group A
5	Medellín	30	26	11	8	7	32	22	10	Group A
6	Santa Fe	30	26	11	8	7	38	33	5	Group A
7	América	29	26	9	11	6	27	24	3	Group A
8	Cúcuta	22	26	6	10	10	19	26	-7	Group B
9	Caldas	21	26	8	5	13	31	41	-10	Group B
10	Quindío	21	26	6	9	11	27	35	-8	Group B
11	Bucaramanga	21	26	5	11	10	20	35	-15	Group B
12	Pereira	19	26	7	5	14	21	28	-7	Group B
13	Magdalena	17	26	5	7	14	18	34	-16	Group B
14	Tolima	14	26	1	12	13	18	34	-16	Group B

=== Results ===
_{Home}\^{Away}	AME	BUC	CAL	CUC	JUN	MAG	DIM	MIL	NAC	ONC	PER	QUI	SFE	TOL
América	—	0–0	1–1	0–0	1–2	2–0	2–1	2–0	1–1	2–1	2–1	2–0	0–2	2–0
Bucaramanga	1–1	—	0–0	1–0	0–0	0–0	0–0	0–1	0–4	1–1	2–0	1–0	1–1	2–2
Cali	2–2	5–1	—	0–1	1–0	2–2	1–0	3–2	2–0	4–1	0–0	3–1	2–1	1–0
Cúcuta	0–0	1–0	0–0	—	0–0	3–0	0–1	0–0	0–0	4–1	0–2	1–1	2–1	2–1
Junior	2–0	2–1	1–1	2–0	—	2–1	1–0	2–1	0–0	1–1	1–0	2–1	0–0	4–2
Magdalena	0–2	2–3	0–1	1–0	0–0	—	2–1	0–1	1–0	2–0	0–0	2–2	1–1	2–0
Medellín	2–1	2–0	1–1	2–0	0–1	3–1	—	2–1	0–3	1–0	3–0	4–1	3–1	2–1
Millonarios	4–0	1–1	0–1	3–0	1–0	1–0	1–1	—	3–0	3–0	2–1	2–0	0–1	1–0
Nacional	1–1	3–1	1–2	1–0	1–1	1–0	1–0	1–0	—	2–1	1–0	2–2	2–2	2–1
Caldas	2–2	2–1	0–2	3–1	1–2	3–0	1–1	1–2	2–4	—	1–0	2–0	2–3	1–1
Pereira	0–1	4–0	1–0	0–0	1–0	2–0	1–1	1–3	1–2	1–0	—	3–2	0–1	0–0
Quindío	0–0	1–2	0–0	2–2	2–0	2–0	0–0	1–0	0–1	0–1	1–0	—	1–1	2–0
Santa Fe	1–0	2–1	3–2	2–0	2–1	2–1	1–1	1–2	1–2	1–2	3–2	2–3	—	0–0
Tolima	0–0	0–0	0–1	2–2	0–0	0–0	0–0	2–3	0–2	0–1	2–0	2–2	2–2	—

== Closing Tournament ==
Each of the teams in Groups A and B played 21 matchdays: the first 7 corresponded to the first round, with 6 matches against all the opponents in their group plus one intergroup match to balance the calendar of the odd groups; the next 7 matchdays were played against the teams from the other group; and the last 7 corresponded to the return legs of the first 7.

=== Group A standings ===
Pos.	Team	Pts	Pld	W	D	L	GF	GA	GD	Qualification
1	Cali	30	21	11	8	2	29	13	16	Hexagonal Final
2	América	27	21	10	7	4	22	16	6
3	Millonarios	26	21	9	8	4	26	14	12
4	Santa Fe	24	21	10	4	7	27	21	6
5	Nacional	24	21	8	8	5	28	16	12
6	Junior	22	21	8	6	7	26	24	2
7	Medellín	18	21	5	8	8	23	29	-6

=== Group B standings ===
Pos.	Team	Pts	Pld	W	D	L	GF	GA	GD	Qualification
1	Pereira	25	21	10	5	6	21	16	5	Hexagonal Final
2	Quindío	21	21	9	3	9	30	27	3
3	Tolima	21	21	9	3	9	26	29	-3
4	Bucaramanga	18	21	6	6	9	22	23	-1
5	Cúcuta	17	21	5	7	9	23	31	-8
6	Caldas	12	21	4	4	13	16	36	-20
7	Magdalena	9	21	2	5	14	16	40	-24

=== Results ===
_{Home}\^{Away}	AME	BUC	CAL	CUC	JUN	MAG	DIM	MIL	NAC	ONC	PER	QUI	SFE	TOL
América	—	1–1	1–1	3–1	1–1		1–1	1–0	1–0	1–0		0–0	0–3	3–2
Bucaramanga	0–1	—		1–1		0–0	3–0			4–0	1–0	2–0	1–3	1–1
Bucaramanga	0–0	—
Cali	0–1	1–0	—	1–0	3–3		2–0	0–0	1–1	3–0	1–1	3–0	3–0
Cúcuta		5–2	0–1	—	1–0	1–1		0–0		2–1	1–0	1–0		0–3
Cúcuta			1–2	—
Junior	0–2	0–2	0–1		—	2–2	1–0	0–0	1–0		2–0		2–2	3–1
Junior					—	2–1
Magdalena	1–2	0–1	1–1	3–1	0–2	—			0–0	3–0	1–3	0–6		1–2
Medellín	1–2		2–2	3–1	1–1	2–0	—	1–1	1–1		1–2	2–0	1–0	2–1
Millonarios	1–0	2–1	0–1		2–1	6–0	0–0	—	1–1	1–0	2–0	3–1	0–1
Nacional	2–1	2–0	0–0	2–1	0–1		1–1	2–0	—	3–0		4–1	2–2	2–0
Caldas		2–0		1–1	2–3	1–0	2–2	1–2		—	2–1	2–0		1–1
Caldas								1–3		—
Pereira	1–0	0–0		1–1		1–0			2–1	0–0	—	1–1	1–0	3–0
Pereira											—		1–0
Quindío		2–1		3–3	2–1	4–1	4–1			3–0	0–1	—	2–0	3–0
Quindío							2–0					—
Santa Fe	0–0		1–2	2–0	1–0	3–1	2–1	1–0	0–0	2–0	3–1		—	1–3
Tolima		2–1	1–0	1–1		3–0		1–2	0–4	1–0	0–1	1–0		—
Tolima									2–0					—

== Qualification to the final hexagonal ==
Pos.	Team	Pts	Pld	W	D	L	GF	GA	GD	Qualification
1	Cali	67	47	25	17	5	67	32	35	Classified by the opening tournament and by group B
2	Nacional	61	47	23	15	9	66	38	28	Classified by the opening tournament
3	Millonarios	59	47	24	11	12	64	35	29	Final Hexagonal
4	América	56	47	19	18	10	49	40	9	Final Hexagonal
5	Junior	55	47	20	15	12	53	42	11	Final Hexagonal
6	Santa Fe	54	47	21	12	14	65	54	11
7	Medellín	48	47	16	16	15	55	51	4
8	Pereira	44	47	17	10	20	42	44	-2	Classified by group B
9	Quindío	42	47	15	12	20	57	62	-5
10	Cúcuta	39	47	11	17	19	42	57	-15
11	Bucaramanga	39	47	11	17	19	42	58	-16
12	Tolima	35	47	10	15	22	44	63	-19
13	Caldas	33	47	12	9	26	47	77	-30
14	Magdalena	26	47	7	12	28	34	74	-40

== Hexagonal Final ==
=== Standings ===
Pos.	Team	Pts	Pld	W	D	L	GF	GA	GD	Qualification
1	Cali	13	10	5	3	2	12	10	2	Champion and Copa Libertadores
2	Nacional	11	10	3	5	2	18	15	3	Runner-up and Copa Libertadores
3	Pereira	10	10	2	6	2	19	16	3
4	Millonarios	9	10	3	3	4	13	14	-1
5	Junior	9	10	3	3	4	19	23	-4
6	América	8	10	2	4	4	15	18	-3

=== First round results ===
Matchday 01 (November 24/1974)
América	2–1	Nacional
Junior	1–0	Millonarios
Pereira	2–2	Cali

Matchday 02 (November 27/1974)
Millonarios	3–1	América
Nacional	1–0	Pereira
Cali	2–1	Junior

Matchday 03 (December 01/1974)
Junior	3–3	Nacional
Millonarios	0–1	Cali
América	2–2	Pereira

Matchday 04 (December 04/1974)
Nacional	0–1	Millonarios
Pereira	1–1	Junior
América	0–0	Cali

Matchday 05 (December 06/1974)
Junior	3–2	América
Millonarios	1–1	Pereira
Cali	2–2	Nacional

=== Second round results ===
Matchday 06 (December 08/1974)
Millonarios	4–2	Junior
Nacional	1–1	América
Cali	1–0	Pereira

Matchday 07 (December 11/1974)
Junior	2–1	Cali
América	0–0	Millonarios
Pereira	2–2	Nacional

Matchday 08 (December 15/1974)
Cali	2–1	Millonarios
Nacional	4–2	Junior
Pereira	5–3	América

Matchday 09 (December 19/1974)
Junior	2–2	Pereira
Millonarios	2–2	Nacional
Cali(C)	1–0	América

Matchday 10 (December 22/1974)
Pereira	4–1	Millonarios
América	4–2	Junior
Nacional	2–0	Cali
