= 1970 Campeonato Profesional =

Campeonato Profesional
- Season: 1970
- Champions: Deportivo Cali (4th title)
- Matches: 376
- Goals: 995 (2.65 per match)
- Top goalscorer: José María Ferrero and Walter Sossa (27)

The 1970 Campeonato Profesional was the twenty-third season of Colombia's top-flight football league. Deportivo Cali won the league for the fourth time and second time in a row after winning the Cuadrangular final.

== Teams ==
Team	City	Stadium
América	Cali	Olímpico Pascual Guerrero
Atlético Bucaramanga	Bucaramanga	Alfonso López
Atlético Nacional	Medellín	Atanasio Girardot
Cúcuta Deportivo	Cúcuta	General Santander
Deportes Quindío	Armenia	San José de Armenia
Deportes Tolima	Ibagué	Gustavo Rojas Pinilla
Deportivo Cali	Cali	Olímpico Pascual Guerrero
Independiente Medellín	Medellín	Atanasio Girardot
Junior	Barranquilla	Romelio Martínez
Millonarios	Bogotá	El Campín
Once Caldas	Manizales	Palogrande
Santa Fe	Bogotá	El Campín
Unión Magdalena	Santa Marta	Eduardo Santos

== Opening Tournament ==
=== Standings ===
Pos	Team	Pld	W	D	L	GF	GA	GD	Pts	Qualification or relegation
1	Santa Fe	26	14	9	3	40	21	+19	37	Final Quadrangular
2	Junior	26	12	9	5	41	30	+11	33	Final Quadrangular
3	Once Caldas	26	12	7	7	43	43	0	31	
4	Independiente Medellín	26	12	6	8	32	29	+3	30	
5	Cúcuta Deportivo	26	10	8	8	43	30	+13	28	
6	Millonarios	26	8	11	7	41	29	+12	27	
7	Deportivo Cali	26	8	10	8	33	30	+3	26	
8	Atlético Nacional	26	10	6	10	40	43	−3	26	
9	Unión Magdalena	26	7	11	8	31	36	−5	25	
10	América de Cali	26	8	8	10	30	35	−5	24	
11	Deportes Quindío	26	3	15	8	24	37	−13	21	
12	Atlético Bucaramanga	26	7	6	13	30	42	−12	20	
13	Deportes Tolima	26	4	11	11	27	37	−10	19	
14	Deportivo Pereira	26	3	11	12	30	43	−13	17	

Source: RSSSF

=== Results ===
_{Home}\^{Away}	AME	BUC	CAL	CUC	JUN	MAG	DIM	MIL	NAC	ONC	PER	QUI	SFE	TOL
América	—	1–2	1–1	1–0	1–3	4–1	2–0	2–1	1–1	0–1	1–0	0–0	2–2	0–0
Bucaramanga	0–1	—	0–3	2–1	1–2	0–1	0–1	0–0	1–2	3–3	4–3	0–1	1–0	3–1
Cali	1–1	0–2	—	2–1	1–1	2–2	1–0	1–0	2–1	1–2	0–0	1–1	0–1	1–1
Cúcuta	5–3	2–0	0–0	—	1–2	2–0	0–1	3–2	2–1	7–2	4–0	4–2	0–0	0–0
Junior	3–2	3–3	3–2	1–1	—	3–1	0–1	1–1	2–2	4–2	2–0	1–0	0–1	2–0
Magdalena	2–1	3–0	1–1	1–2	3–1	—	0–0	1–0	1–1	1–2	3–1	1–1	1–1	1–1
Medellín	0–2	3–5	1–0	2–2	1–1	0–1	—	0–2	4–0	1–0	2–1	2–0	1–2	3–2
Millonarios	2–0	3–0	1–1	0–0	0–0	2–2	1–1	—	5–1	1–2	3–1	4–1	0–1	1–0
Nacional	0–1	2–1	2–1	1–0	1–2	5–2	1–2	3–3	—	2–2	3–2	4–1	1–2	1–0
Caldas	3–1	1–0	1–0	2–2	2–1	2–0	1–2	1–0	2–3	—	2–2	1–1	2–2	1–0
Pereira	4–0	0–0	1–3	1–1	0–0	1–1	3–1	2–4	1–1	1–2	—	2–2	1–1	3–1
Quindío	1–1	1–1	1–2	2–1	0–0	0–0	1–1	2–2	1–0	1–1	0–0	—	1–1	0–2
Santa Fe	1–0	3–0	3–2	0–1	3–1	2–0	0–1	1–1	2–0	3–1	0–0	4–2	—	3–1
Tolima	1–1	1–1	2–4	2–1	0–2	1–1	1–1	2–2	0–1	4–2	2–0	1–1	1–1	—

== Ending Tournament ==
=== Standings ===
Pos	Team	Pld	W	D	L	GF	GA	GD	Pts	Qualification or relegation
1	Deportivo Cali	26	13	11	2	34	15	+19	37	Final Quadrangular
2	Cúcuta Deportivo	26	15	3	8	47	38	+9	33	Final Quadrangular
3	Santa Fe	26	9	12	5	46	31	+15	30	
4	Unión Magdalena	26	12	6	8	37	32	+5	30	
5	América de Cali	26	9	11	6	36	28	+8	29	
6	Millonarios	26	11	7	8	34	28	+6	29	
7	Independiente Medellín	26	9	8	9	28	30	−2	26	
8	Once Caldas	26	9	7	10	30	29	+1	25	
9	Junior	26	8	7	11	44	46	−2	23	
10	Atlético Bucaramanga	26	7	9	10	27	34	−7	23	
11	Deportes Tolima	26	6	10	10	39	44	−5	22	
12	Deportes Quindío	26	7	7	12	19	31	−12	21	
13	Deportivo Pereira	26	8	4	14	32	52	−20	20	
14	Atlético Nacional	26	3	10	13	28	43	−15	16	

Source: RSSSF

=== Results ===
_{Home}\^{Away}	AME	BUC	CAL	CUC	JUN	MAG	DIM	MIL	NAC	ONC	PER	QUI	SFE	TOL
América	—	2–2	1–1	4–1	1–0	1–1	0–1	1–0	0–0	2–2	2–0	4–1	2–1	0–0
Bucaramanga	0–0	—	0–1	2–2	1–2	1–0	0–0	3–3	3–1	2–1	0–1	0–1	1–3	0–2
Cali	1–1	0–1	—	3–0	3–1	2–2	1–0	2–0	2–1	0–0	1–1	4–1	0–0	1–0
Cúcuta	3–3	4–2	1–3	—	2–0	2–0	2–0	2–1	3–0	1–0	2–0	2–0	2–1	2–1
Junior	4–2	4–0	1–1	2–1	—	0–2	1–2	1–2	5–1	1–1	1–1	3–1	3–3	2–2
Magdalena	2–1	0–0	0–1	1–0	2–1	—	2–1	1–0	3–1	2–0	6–3	1–1	2–0	5–2
Medellín	1–0	0–0	1–2	4–1	4–2	0–0	—	0–2	1–0	1–0	2–1	2–1	2–4	1–1
Millonarios	2–0	2–2	1–0	2–1	1–3	1–0	2–0	—	1–1	1–1	4–0	1–0	1–1	2–0
Nacional	1–3	1–2	0–0	2–4	3–0	1–0	1–1	1–1	—	0–0	6–0	2–3	1–1	0–0
Caldas	0–2	0–2	1–2	2–1	4–2	3–0	1–1	1–0	2–0	—	2–1	2–0	2–1	1–2
Pereira	1–2	1–0	0–0	0–1	1–3	3–1	2–0	3–2	2–2	1–3	—	1–0	1–4	4–2
Quindío	2–1	0–1	0–0	0–1	0–0	0–0	1–0	0–0	2–1	1–0	0–1	—	1–1	0–0
Santa Fe	0–0	1–1	0–0	2–2	3–0	5–1	1–1	0–1	1–1	3–1	3–1	2–1	—	5–3
Tolima	1–1	2–1	1–3	3–4	2–2	2–3	2–2	4–1	3–0	0–0	3–2	1–2	0–0	—
