= 1973 Campeonato Profesional =

Campeonato Profesional
- Season: 1973
- Champions: Atlético Nacional (2nd title)
- Matches: 346
- Goals: 848 (2.45 per match)
- Top goalscorer: Nelson Silva Pacheco (36)

The 1973 Campeonato Profesional was the twenty-sixth season of Colombia's top-flight football league. Atlético Nacional won the league for the second time after winning the Triangular final.

== Teams ==
Team	City	Stadium
América	Cali	Olímpico Pascual Guerrero
Atlético Bucaramanga	Bucaramanga	Alfonso López
Atlético Nacional	Medellín	Atanasio Girardot
Cúcuta Deportivo	Cúcuta	General Santander
Deportes Quindío	Armenia	San José de Armenia
Deportes Tolima	Ibagué	Gustavo Rojas Pinilla
Deportivo Cali	Cali	Olímpico Pascual Guerrero
Deportivo Pereira	Pereira	Hernán Ramírez Villegas
Independiente Medellín	Medellín	Atanasio Girardot
Junior	Barranquilla	Romelio Martínez
Millonarios	Bogotá	El Campín
Once Caldas	Manizales	Palogrande
Santa Fe	Bogotá	El Campín
Unión Magdalena	Santa Marta	Eduardo Santos

== Opening Tournament ==
=== Standings ===
Pos	Team	Pld	W	D	L	GF	GA	GD	Pts	Qualification or relegation
1	Millonarios F.C.	26	16	7	3	48	20	+28	39	Final Triangular
2	Deportivo Cali	26	13	10	3	41	22	+19	36	Final Triangular
3	Atlético Nacional	26	11	9	6	35	30	+5	31	
4	Cúcuta Deportivo	26	11	7	8	43	28	+15	29	
5	Unión Magdalena	26	11	7	8	28	25	+3	29	
6	Independiente Medellín	26	10	8	8	34	26	+8	28	
7	Deportes Quindío	26	8	8	10	21	26	−5	24	
8	Atlético Bucaramanga	26	9	6	11	31	38	−7	24	
9	Deportivo Pereira	26	7	9	10	37	38	−1	23	
10	Atlético Junior	26	7	9	10	25	31	−6	23	
11	Once Caldas	26	6	11	9	24	34	−10	23	
12	Independiente Santa Fe	26	7	8	11	26	35	−9	22	
13	América de Cali	26	5	7	14	29	47	−18	17	
14	Deportes Tolima	26	3	10	13	22	44	−22	16	

Source: RSSSF

=== Results ===
_{Home}\^{Away}	AME	BUC	CAL	CUC	JUN	MAG	DIM	MIL	NAC	ONC	PER	QUI	SFE	TOL
América	—	2–2	0–2	1–0	3–4	1–2	1–1	2–2	1–1	4–0	2–1	1–2	1–0	0–1
Bucaramanga	3–1	—	0–2	0–1	3–1	2–1	2–1	0–1	2–3	2–2	1–1	1–0	2–0	0–0
Cali	3–1	1–2	—	2–2	2–1	0–0	2–0	0–0	6–2	2–0	0–2	1–1	1–1	1–1
Cúcuta	3–1	8–1	1–1	—	1–0	1–1	2–1	0–0	0–1	3–1	4–1	2–0	0–1	1–1
Junior	0–2	2–0	1–4	2–2	—	0–0	0–1	0–0	2–0	2–2	3–1	2–0	1–0	2–0
Magdalena	0–0	0–3	0–1	2–0	0–0	—	2–1	1–0	1–1	3–0	2–1	2–1	2–0	4–0
Medellín	2–0	1–2	1–1	2–0	4–0	3–0	—	2–3	2–2	1–0	1–0	0–1	1–0	1–0
Millonarios	4–0	1–0	1–2	3–0	1–0	4–1	1–1	—	3–0	1–0	2–4	4–1	1–0	5–1
Nacional	3–0	0–0	1–2	2–1	0–0	3–0	1–0	1–2	—	3–1	2–0	1–0	2–1	1–0
Caldas	3–1	2–0	1–1	0–0	0–0	1–0	0–0	1–1	1–1	—	1–0	0–0	3–2	2–2
Pereira	5–2	2–2	0–1	3–2	3–1	1–0	3–3	1–1	1–1	2–0	—	0–0	1–1	1–1
Quindío	1–0	2–0	1–1	0–1	0–0	0–1	0–1	1–2	0–0	1–1	1–0	—	2–2	1–0
Santa Fe	1–1	1–0	2–1	1–4	1–1	0–0	0–0	1–3	2–1	2–1	2–1	2–3	—	3–2
Tolima	1–1	2–1	0–1	0–4	1–0	1–3	3–3	0–2	2–2	0–1	2–2	1–2	0–0	—

== Ending Tournament ==
=== Standings ===
Pos	Team	Pld	W	D	L	GF	GA	GD	Pts	Qualification or relegation
1	Atlético Nacional	24	15	4	5	41	23	+18	34	Final Triangular
2	Millonarios F.C.	24	14	5	5	36	21	+15	33	Final Triangular
3	Independiente Medellín	24	12	7	5	28	19	+9	31	
4	Deportivo Cali	24	9	10	5	28	19	+9	28	
5	Deportes Tolima	24	8	9	7	30	29	+1	25	
6	Atlético Junior	24	9	6	9	33	36	−3	24	
7	Independiente Santa Fe	24	9	5	10	35	32	+3	23	
8	América de Cali	24	9	4	11	38	29	+9	22	
9	Deportivo Pereira	24	7	7	10	27	34	−7	21	
10	Deportes Quindío	24	7	7	10	20	32	−12	21	
11	Once Caldas	24	6	7	11	27	32	−5	19	
12	Atlético Bucaramanga	24	7	4	13	26	38	−12	18	
13	Unión Magdalena	24	4	5	15	20	45	−25	13	

Source: RSSSF

=== Results ===
_{Home}\^{Away}	AME	BUC	CAL	JUN	MAG	DIM	MIL	NAC	ONC	PER	QUI	SFE	TOL
América	—	1–2	2–4	4–1	4–1	4–0	0–1	2–1	2–1	2–2	4–0	4–0	0–1
Bucaramanga	1–0	—	0–1	1–0	4–0	1–1	2–0	3–1	1–1	0–0	2–2	0–2	0–5
Cali	1–3	2–0	—	4–0	1–0	1–1	1–0	0–0	0–0	4–1	1–1	1–0	1–1
Junior	1–1	0–2	1–1	—	2–0	2–1	1–2	2–2	4–1	2–0	3–0	4–1	1–1
Magdalena	1–1	1–0	0–0	4–2	—	0–0	0–3	1–2	2–0	3–0	1–1	2–2	0–1
Medellín	0–1	1–0	2–1	3–0	2–0	—	2–0	1–2	1–0	3–3	0–0	1–0	0–0
Millonarios	2–1	3–2	2–0	1–1	3–0	0–2	—	1–1	1–0	3–0	4–2	1–0	1–0
Nacional	1–0	4–0	1–0	3–1	1–0	0–1	2–1	—	2–1	2–1	2–0	0–1	3–2
Caldas	1–0	1–0	1–2	0–1	3–0	2–2	2–2	1–2	—	2–1	3–1	1–1	1–2
Pereira	4–1	4–3	0–0	0–1	1–0	1–0	0–1	0–3	1–2	—	0–0	2–0	1–1
Quindío	1–0	1–0	1–0	1–2	4–1	0–1	1–1	1–4	1–0	0–0	—	1–0	1–0
Santa Fe	2–1	5–2	1–1	3–1	5–1	0–1	0–2	1–1	1–1	0–2	2–0	—	7–2
Tolima	0–0	2–0	1–1	0–0	3–2	1–2	1–1	2–1	2–2	1–3	1–0	0–1	—

== Final Triangular ==
=== Standings ===
Pos	Team	Pld	W	D	L	GF	GA	GD	Pts	Qualification or relegation
1	Atlético Nacional	4	3	0	1	5	4	+1	6	Champion and Libertadores Cup 1974
2	Millonarios	4	1	1	2	3	3	0	3	Tiebreaker for second place
3	Deportivo Cali	4	1	1	2	2	3	−1	3	Tiebreaker for second place

Updated to match(es) played on unknown. Source:

=== Matchdays ===
Results
Matchday	Home	Result	Away	Stadium	Fecha
First	Nacional	2 : 1	Cali	Atanasio Girardot	December 9
First	Rest: Millonarios				
Second	Millonarios	0 : 2	Nacional	El Campín	December 12
Second	Rest: Cali				
Third	Cali	1 : 0	Millonarios	Pascual Guerrero	December 14
Third	Rest: Nacional				
Quarter	Cali	0 : 1	Nacional(C)	Pascual Guerrero	December 16
Quarter	Rest: Millonarios				
Fifth	Nacional	0 : 3	Millonarios	Atanasio Girardot	December 20
Fifth	Rest: Cali				
Sixth	Millonarios	0 : 0	Cali	El Campín	December 23
Sixth	Rest: Nacional				
