= 1971 Campeonato Profesional =

Campeonato Profesional
- Season: 1971
- Champions: Santa Fe (5th title)
- Matches: 379
- Goals: 1,026 (2.71 per match)
- Top goalscorer: Hugo Lóndero and Apolinar Paniagua (30)

The 1971 Campeonato Profesional was the twenty-fourth season of Colombia's top-flight football league. Santa Fe won the league for the fifth time after winning the Cuadrangular final.

== Teams ==
Team	City	Stadium
América	Cali	Olímpico Pascual Guerrero
Atlético Nacional	Medellín	Atanasio Girardot
Cúcuta Deportivo	Cúcuta	General Santander
Deportes Quindío	Armenia	San José de Armenia
Deportes Tolima	Ibagué	Gustavo Rojas Pinilla
Deportivo Cali	Cali	Olímpico Pascual Guerrero
Deportivo Pereira	Pereira	Hernán Ramírez Villegas
Junior	Barranquilla	Romelio Martínez
Millonarios	Bogotá	El Campín
Once Caldas	Manizales	Palogrande
Oro Negro	Barrancabermeja	Daniel Villa Zapata
Real Cartagena	Colombia	Jaime Morón León
Santa Fe	Bogotá	El Campín
Unión Magdalena	Santa Marta	Eduardo Santos

== Opening Tournament ==
=== Standings ===
Pos	Team	Pld	W	D	L	GF	GA	GD	Pts	Qualification or relegation
1	Atlético Nacional	26	16	8	2	43	23	+20	40	Final Quadrangular
2	Deportivo Cali	26	16	7	3	48	28	+20	39	Final Quadrangular
3	Santa Fe	26	13	10	3	44	25	+19	36	
4	Millonarios	26	13	6	7	44	30	+14	32	
5	Cúcuta Deportivo	26	10	9	7	43	36	+7	29	
6	América de Cali	26	9	8	9	34	33	+1	26	
7	Deportivo Pereira	26	8	10	8	34	38	−4	26	
8	Once Caldas	26	9	6	11	39	33	+6	24	
9	Deportes Quindío	26	6	11	9	29	43	−14	23	
10	Deportes Tolima	26	6	10	10	33	38	−5	22	
11	Real Cartagena	26	4	12	10	18	32	−14	20	
12	Junior	26	7	4	15	29	40	−11	18	
13	Oro Negro	26	4	7	15	23	47	−24	15	
14	Unión Magdalena	26	4	6	16	28	43	−15	14	

Source: RSSSF

=== Results ===
_{Home}\^{Away}	AME	CAL	CUC	JUN	MAG	MIL	NAC	ONC	ORO	PER	QUI	RCA	SFE	TOL
América	—	3–1	1–1	2–0	2–1	2–1	0–0	2–0	1–0	1–0	0–1	2–0	0–1	3–1
Cali	4–2	—	2–2	3–1	5–2	1–0	2–3	3–1	1–0	2–2	2–1	2–0	2–1	2–0
Cúcuta	3–1	0–1	—	3–1	2–2	0–0	3–4	3–1	1–1	3–0	4–1	1–0	0–3	4–1
Junior	1–1	0–1	1–2	—	0–0	2–1	2–0	2–1	5–2	1–0	5–1	1–1	1–2	0–4
Magdalena	1–1	1–1	0–2	0–1	—	1–2	4–1	0–1	1–0	1–2	1–1	3–0	1–2	3–0
Millonarios	3–3	1–4	7–0	3–1	3–1	—	1–1	1–0	2–1	4–2	2–2	2–0	0–2	0–1
Nacional	1–0	1–1	1–0	1–0	2–1	2–0	—	2–0	2–0	4–1	2–2	2–0	1–0	2–2
Caldas	1–0	3–1	2–1	3–0	2–0	2–3	0–0	—	8–1	0–1	5–3	1–1	1–1	2–0
Oro Negro	1–1	0–1	1–4	1–0	2–0	1–1	0–2	2–1	—	0–1	0–1	2–2	2–3	2–1
Pereira	4–3	1–1	1–1	2–1	3–0	0–2	2–2	1–0	0–0	—	1–2	0–0	2–2	2–2
Quindío	0–0	0–1	1–1	2–1	1–0	1–1	0–3	1–1	4–1	0–3	—	0–0	1–1	0–0
Cartagena	2–1	2–2	0–0	1–0	3–1	0–2	0–1	1–0	0–0	2–2	1–1	—	0–0	1–1
Santa Fe	3–0	0–0	1–1	2–1	1–1	0–1	1–1	2–2	2–1	4–1	4–2	3–1	—	1–1
Tolima	2–2	1–2	2–1	1–1	3–2	0–1	1–2	1–1	2–2	0–0	3–0	2–0	1–2	—

== Ending Tournament ==
=== Standings ===
Pos	Team	Pld	W	D	L	GF	GA	GD	Pts	Qualification or relegation
1	Millonarios	26	17	5	4	41	17	+24	39	Final Quadrangular
2	Santa Fe	26	15	6	5	48	23	+25	36	Final Quadrangular
3	Atlético Nacional	26	14	5	7	42	31	+11	33	
4	Deportivo Cali	26	12	6	8	44	33	+11	30	
5	Deportes Quindío	26	11	8	7	41	33	+8	30	
6	Once Caldas	26	11	6	9	45	46	−1	28	
7	Cúcuta Deportivo	26	8	10	8	37	43	−6	26	
8	Deportivo Pereira	26	7	11	8	39	36	+3	25	
9	Unión Magdalena	26	7	9	10	36	43	−7	23	
10	América de Cali	26	6	10	10	26	38	−12	22	
11	Real Cartagena	26	7	7	12	27	35	−8	21	
12	Junior	26	2	15	9	21	38	−17	19	
13	Oro Negro	26	5	8	13	34	44	−10	18	
14	Deportes Tolima	26	1	12	13	23	44	−21	14	

Source: RSSSF

=== Results ===
_{Home}\^{Away}	AME	CAL	CUC	JUN	MAG	MIL	NAC	ONC	ORO	PER	QUI	RCA	SFE	TOL
América	—	1–2	1–1	1–1	0–0	0–0	1–0	3–2	1–0	4–4	1–3	1–0	0–1	2–0
Cali	1–0	—	2–2	2–0	2–0	0–2	2–0	8–0	1–0	1–0	5–3	4–2	1–3	1–1
Cúcuta	0–0	1–0	—	1–1	2–4	2–1	2–1	1–2	2–1	2–2	3–2	1–0	1–3	5–0
Junior	3–1	0–0	0–1	—	1–1	1–3	0–2	2–2	0–0	1–0	2–4	2–2	0–0	1–1
Magdalena	2–1	2–2	2–2	2–0	—	0–1	0–2	1–2	1–1	1–0	2–1	3–1	0–2	5–2
Millonarios	4–0	3–0	1–0	1–1	2–0	—	2–0	3–2	4–1	2–0	3–1	2–1	0–2	0–0
Nacional	2–1	4–1	2–2	3–1	2–0	3–0	—	4–2	3–2	1–1	1–0	2–0	1–2	1–0
Caldas	1–1	1–0	6–2	1–1	2–1	0–1	5–1	—	2–0	1–1	1–2	3–0	0–4	3–1
Oro Negro	1–1	0–2	3–3	3–0	3–3	0–0	1–2	0–2	—	1–2	4–1	2–3	2–0	2–1
Pereira	1–3	1–3	0–0	1–1	5–2	3–1	0–0	5–2	3–0	—	0–1	2–1	2–2	2–2
Quindío	1–1	3–1	1–0	4–0	2–2	0–0	1–1	2–0	2–2	0–0	—	3–1	1–0	1–1
Cartagena	4–0	1–1	3–0	0–0	0–0	0–3	0–0	0–0	2–0	2–0	0–2	—	1–0	2–1
Santa Fe	3–0	1–0	4–0	2–2	4–1	0–1	3–4	1–1	1–1	2–2	2–0	2–0	—	2–1
Tolima	1–1	2–2	1–1	0–0	1–1	0–1	2–0	1–2	2–4	0–2	0–0	1–1	1–2	—

== Final Quadrangular ==
=== Standings ===
Pos	Team	Pld	W	D	L	GF	GA	GD	Pts	Qualification or relegation
1	Santa Fe	6	2	3	1	8	6	+2	7	Libertadores Cup and final tiebreaker
2	Atlético Nacional	6	2	3	1	7	6	+1	7	Libertadores Cup and final tiebreaker
3	Millonarios	6	2	2	2	6	5	+1	6	
4	Deportivo Cali	6	1	2	3	7	11	−4	4	

Source: RSSSF

=== Matchdays ===
Results
Matchday	Home	Result	Away	Stadium	Fecha
First	Millonarios	2 : 1	Cali	Nemesio Camacho el campín	December 17
First	Nacional	1 : 1	Santa Fe	Estadio Atanasio Girardot	December 17
Second	Cali	1 : 1	Nacional	Olímpico Pascual Guerrero	December 19
Second	Millonarios	0 : 0	Santa Fe	Nemesio Camacho el campín	December 19
Third	Santa Fe	2 : 2	Cali	Nemesio Camacho el campín	December 21
Third	Nacional	1 : 1	Millonarios	Estadio Atanasio Girardot	December 21
Quarter	Cali	1 : 3	Millonarios	Olímpico Pascual Guerrero	December 23
Quarter	Santa Fe	3 : 1	Nacional	Nemesio Camacho el campín	December 23
Fifth	Nacional	2 : 0	Cali	Estadio Atanasio Girardot	December 26
Fifth	Santa Fe	1 : 0	Millonarios	Nemesio Camacho el campín	December 26
Sixth	Millonarios	0 : 1	Nacional	Nemesio Camacho el campín	December 29
Sixth	Cali	2 : 1	Santa Fe	Olímpico Pascual Guerrero	December 29

Source:RSSSF

== Final championship tiebreaker series ==
=== Results ===
Results
Matchday	Home	Result	Away	Stadium	Fecha
First leg	Nacional	0 : 0	Santa Fe	Estadio Atanasio Girardot	January 30, 1972
Second leg	Santa Fe	0 : 0	Nacional	Nemesio Camacho el campín	February 03, 1972
Tie-Breaker Match	Santa Fe(C)	3 : 2	Nacional	Olímpico Pascual Guerrero	February 10, 1972

Source:RSSSF
