= 1976 Campeonato Profesional =

Campeonato Profesional
- Season: 1976
- Champions: Atlético Nacional (3rd title)
- Matches: 361
- Goals: 933 (2.58 per match)
- Top goalscorer: Miguel Ángel Converti (33)

The 1976 Campeonato Profesional was the twenty-ninth season of Colombia's top-flight football league. Atlético Nacional won the league for the third time after winning the Hexagonal final.

== Teams ==
Team	City	Stadium
América	Cali	Olímpico Pascual Guerrero
Atlético Bucaramanga	Bucaramanga	Alfonso López
Atlético Nacional	Medellín	Atanasio Girardot
Cúcuta Deportivo	Cúcuta	General Santander
Deportes Quindío	Armenia	San José de Armenia
Deportes Tolima	Ibagué	Gustavo Rojas Pinilla
Deportivo Cali	Cali	Olímpico Pascual Guerrero
Deportivo Pereira	Pereira	Hernán Ramírez Villegas
Independiente Medellín	Medellín	Atanasio Girardot
Junior	Barranquilla	Romelio Martínez
Millonarios	Bogotá	El Campín
Once Caldas	Manizales	Palogrande
Santa Fe	Bogotá	El Campín
Unión Magdalena	Santa Marta	Eduardo Santos
