= 1969 Campeonato Profesional =

Campeonato Profesional
- Season: 1969
- Champions: Deportivo Cali (3rd title)
- Copa Libertadores: Deportivo Cali; América de Cali
- Top goalscorer: Hugo Horacio Lóndero (24 goals)

The 1969 Campeonato Profesional was the 21st season of Colombia's top-flight football league. 14 teams competed against one another. Deportivo Cali won the Torneo Apertura, while Millonarios won the Torneo Clausura. Cali went on to win their third league title in the triangular final which was held in January 1970, while América de Cali earned the right to enter the 1970 Copa Libertadores instead of Millonarios. Hugo Horacio Lóndero, playing for América de Cali, was the topscorer with 24 goals.

== Teams ==
Team	City	Stadium
América de Cali	Cali	Estadio Olímpico Pascual Guerrero
Atlético Bucaramanga	Bucaramanga	Estadio Alfonso López
Atlético Nacional	Medellín	Estadio Atanasio Girardot
Cúcuta Deportivo	Cúcuta	Estadio General Santander
Deportes Quindío	Armenia	Estadio San José de Armenia
Deportes Tolima	Ibagué	Estadio Serrano de Ávila
Deportivo Cali	Cali	Estadio Olímpico Pascual Guerrero
Deportivo Pereira	Pereira	Estadio Alberto Mora Mora
Independiente Medellín	Medellín	Estadio Atanasio Girardot
Junior	Barranquilla	Estadio Romelio Martínez
Millonarios	Bogotá	Estadio El Campín
Once Caldas	Manizales	Estadio Fernando Londoño y Londoño
Santa Fe	Bogotá	Estadio El Campín
Unión Magdalena	Santa Marta	Estadio Eduardo Santos

== Opening Tournament ==
=== Standings ===
Pos	Team	Pld	W	D	L	GF	GA	GD	Pts	Qualification or relegation
1	Deportivo Cali	26	14	8	4	55	32	+23	36	Triangular Final
2	América de Cali	26	10	13	3	36	25	+11	33	Triangular Final
3	Millonarios	26	11	10	5	45	37	+8	32	
4	Deportes Quindío	26	10	10	6	35	29	+6	30	
5	Junior	26	10	8	8	42	39	+3	28	
6	Cúcuta Deportivo	26	11	4	11	46	42	+4	26	
7	Atlético Bucaramanga	26	8	10	8	28	24	+4	26	
8	Once Caldas	26	8	9	9	37	48	−11	25	
9	Santa Fe	26	7	10	9	57	55	+2	24	
10	Independiente Medellín	26	9	5	12	42	46	−4	23	
11	Deportivo Pereira	26	9	5	12	41	47	−6	23	
12	Unión Magdalena	26	6	9	11	26	38	−12	21	
13	Deportes Tolima	26	7	6	13	38	49	−11	20	
14	Atlético Nacional	26	4	9	13	30	45	−15	17	

Source: RSSSF

=== Results ===
_{Home}\^{Away}	AME	BUC	CAL	CUC	JUN	MAG	DIM	MIL	NAC	ONC	PER	QUI	SFE	TOL
América	—	2–1	1–1	1–2	2–2	1–0	1–1	2–1	3–1	1–1	2–2	2–0	2–0	0–0
Bucaramanga	0–0	—	1–1	2–0	0–1	2–1	2–1	1–1	1–1	2–1	5–0	0–0	2–2	1–0
Cali	2–2	3–1	—	3–0	3–1	3–0	1–1	2–2	7–2	6–1	3–2	1–0	3–2	3–0
Cúcuta	1–1	1–0	0–0	—	4–0	2–1	5–1	0–0	2–2	6–0	3–2	4–2	0–1	3–1
Junior	4–4	0–1	1–1	2–3	—	0–0	1–0	5–1	2–0	2–2	2–1	2–1	3–1	3–1
Magdalena	1–0	1–1	2–2	1–2	2–2	—	1–0	3–0	2–1	0–0	0–0	0–0	2–2	2–1
Medellín	0–2	0–0	0–1	3–1	3–1	1–4	—	4–2	1–0	3–1	1–3	1–3	3–2	4–2
Millonarios	0–0	2–2	2–1	3–2	1–2	3–0	2–0	—	3–1	2–0	2–1	2–0	1–0	2–2
Nacional	0–0	2–1	0–1	2–1	0–1	3–1	3–0	2–2	—	2–3	0–2	1–1	1–1	0–1
Caldas	1–2	2–1	2–0	3–1	1–1	1–1	2–2	1–1	1–2	—	4–1	0–1	3–1	0–3
Pereira	2–0	0–1	1–2	2–0	2–1	2–0	0–2	1–3	3–1	5–1	—	2–2	3–3	2–1
Quindío	1–1	1–0	3–1	3–1	2–1	1–0	0–0	0–0	3–3	1–3	3–0	—	2–1	3–1
Santa Fe	0–1	0–0	3–1	5–2	2–2	6–1	3–2	4–6	2–2	3–3	2–2	1–1	—	6–4
Tolima	2–3	1–0	1–3	2–0	1–0	2–0	3–8	1–1	0–0	0–0	3–0	1–1	3–4	—

== Ending Tournament ==
=== Standings ===
Pos	Team	Pld	W	D	L	GF	GA	GD	Pts	Qualification or relegation
1	Millonarios	26	18	4	4	41	13	+28	40	Final triangular and tiebreaker
2	Deportivo Cali	26	18	4	4	41	19	+22	40	Final triangular and tiebreaker
3	Deportes Quindío	26	11	10	5	37	22	+15	32	
4	Deportivo Pereira	26	11	10	5	37	29	+8	32	
5	América de Cali	26	12	6	8	43	26	+17	30	
6	Junior	26	10	9	7	47	42	+5	29	
7	Once Caldas	26	10	7	9	36	35	+1	27	
8	Santa Fe	26	8	10	8	38	35	+3	26	
9	Deportes Tolima	26	10	6	10	34	33	+1	26	
10	Atlético Nacional	26	8	4	14	26	41	−15	20	
11	Unión Magdalena	26	4	9	13	23	46	−23	17	
12	Atlético Bucaramanga	26	6	4	16	26	46	−20	16	
13	Independiente Medellín	26	4	7	15	35	52	−17	15	
14	Cúcuta Deportivo	26	5	4	17	27	52	−25	14	

Source: RSSSF

=== Results ===
_{Home}\^{Away}	AME	BUC	CAL	CUC	JUN	MAG	DIM	MIL	NAC	ONC	PER	QUI	SFE	TOL
América	—	4–0	0–1	5–0	1–1	2–1	2–1	1–1	2–0	4–0	2–0	4–1	2–0	4–2
Bucaramanga	1–1	—	1–3	1–2	2–0	1–1	3–1	0–1	2–1	0–0	2–2	0–1	1–0	1–0
Cali	1–1	1–0	—	3–1	2–0	2–1	3–2	0–2	4–0	3–0	1–0	1–1	3–2	2–1
Cúcuta	0–0	2–0	0–1	—	2–3	4–0	4–4	0–1	2–2	1–3	0–2	1–2	3–1	3–4
Junior	3–0	3–1	3–2	2–1	—	1–1	4–2	1–0	4–1	3–0	3–3	2–2	2–2	2–1
Magdalena	1–0	3–2	0–0	0–0	3–0	—	2–2	1–2	0–1	1–0	1–3	0–2	2–2	1–1
Medellín	1–2	1–2	1–3	0–2	1–0	2–2	—	2–2	1–0	3–1	1–1	0–6	2–3	4–0
Millonarios	2–0	2–1	1–0	4–0	6–1	3–0	1–0	—	2–0	2–0	0–1	1–0	0–1	2–0
Nacional	1–0	3–2	0–1	1–0	3–2	0–0	3–1	0–1	—	1–2	2–3	2–1	0–1	0–0
Caldas	3–1	6–2	1–0	4–0	2–2	2–0	1–0	1–2	0–1	—	2–0	2–0	1–1	0–0
Pereira	0–3	2–1	1–2	2–0	1–1	3–0	2–1	1–1	2–2	2–1	—	0–0	3–1	0–0
Quindío	1–0	3–0	0–0	2–0	2–1	3–0	1–1	1–0	3–1	1–1	0–0	—	2–2	0–1
Santa Fe	1–1	2–0	0–1	3–0	1–1	3–0	1–1	1–2	3–1	1–1	2–2	1–1	—	2–3
Tolima	2–1	1–0	0–1	1–0	0–0	5–2	1–0	0–0	2–0	2–0	0–1	1–1	0–1	—

=== Tiebreaker ===
18 December 1969

Millonarios	1–1	Deportivo Cali

21 December 1969

Deportivo Cali	0–0	Millonarios

23 December 1969

Millonarios	1–1	Deportivo Cali
Penalties
Castaño (penalty scored) (penalty scored); Díaz (penalty scored) (penalty scored) (penalty scored)	5–0	(penalty missed) Lallana

Note: Millonarios took all their five penalties first, and Cali given the chance to match them. However, Cali missed their first penalty and the game ended there, as Millonarios had scored all of theirs.

== Triangular Final ==
Pos	Team	Pld	W	D	L	GF	GA	GD	Pts	Qualification or relegation
1	Deportivo Cali (C)	4	3	1	0	7	4	+3	7	Qualified for 1970 Copa Libertadores
2	América de Cali	4	1	1	2	6	7	−1	3	Qualified for 1970 Copa Libertadores
3	Millonarios	4	1	0	3	2	4	−2	2	

Source: RSSSF
(C) Champions

== Top goalscorers ==
Rank	Name	Club	Goals
1	(Argentina) Hugo Horacio Lóndero	América de Cali	24
2	(Uruguay) Walter Sossa	Santa Fe	23
2	(Argentina) Pedro Prospitti	Santa Fe	23
4	(Argentina) Juan Carlos Lallana	Deportivo Cali	21
5	(Argentina) Eduardo Curia	América de Cali	20
6	(Colombia) Alfredo Arango	Unión Magdalena	18
6	(Colombia) Edison Angulo	Deportivo Pereira	18
6	(Colombia) Orlando Mesa	Deportes Quindío	18
9	(Brazil) Airton Dos Santos	Junior	16
9	(Colombia) Gustavo Santa	Atlético Nacional	16

Source: RSSSF.com Colombia 1969
