= List of Colombia international footballers born outside Colombia =

This is a list of football players who have represented the Colombia national football team in international football since 1926 and were born outside Colombia.

== List of players ==
The following players:

1. have played at least one game for the full (senior male) Colombia national team since 1926; and
2. were born outside Colombia.

This list includes players who have dual citizenship with Colombia and/or have become naturalised Colombian citizens. The players are ordered per modern-day country of birth.

List of players
Country of birth	Player	Caps	Goals	Period
Argentina	Jorge Amado	2	0	1977
Argentina	Jorge Ramón Cáceres	6	0	1977
Argentina	Alfredo Di Stéfano	4	0	1951
Argentina	Hugo Horacio Lóndero	4	0	1975
Argentina	Raúl Navarro	1	0	1976
Argentina	Luis Gerónimo López	6	0	1977
United States	Devan Tanton	1	0	2023
Uruguay	Nelson Silva Pacheco	3	0	1975

== See also ==
- List of Colombia international footballers
