= Londero =

Londero or Lóndero is a surname. Notable people with the surname include:

- Hugo Lóndero (born 1946), Argentinian football player
- Juan Ignacio Londero (born 1993), Argentinian tennis player
