= Hugo Soto =

Hugo Soto may refer to:

- Hugo Soto (footballer)
- Hugo Soto (actor)

== See also ==
- Hugo Soto-Martinez, American labor organizer and politician
