= Hugo Soto (footballer) =

Colombian footballer (born 1983)

Personal information
- Full name: Hugo Emilio Soto Miranda
- Date of birth: September 28, 1983 (age 43)
- Place of birth: Cartagena, Colombia
- Height: 1.82 m (6 ft 0 in)
- Position: Defender

Team information
- Current team: Zamora
- Number: 27

Senior career*
Years	Team	Apps	(Gls)
2004–2006	Atlético Nacional		
2007–2011	La Equidad	127	(4)
2012	Atlético Huila	17	(1)
2012–present	Zamora		
- * Club domestic league appearances and goals

Hugo Emilio Soto Miranda (born September 28, 1983) is a Colombian footballer who plays for Zamora in the Venezuelan league. His usual position is central defender

== Honours ==
=== Player ===
La Equidad

- Copa Colombia (2008)

== See also ==
- Football in Colombia
- List of football clubs in Colombia
