= Hugo Lóndero =

Argentine-born Colombian footballer (born 1946)

Personal information
- Full name: Hugo Horacio Lóndero Secullini
- Date of birth: 18 September 1946 (age 80)
- Place of birth: Colonia Caroya, Argentina
- Height: 1.78 m (5 ft 10 in)
- Position: Forward

Senior career*
| Years | Team | Apps | (Gls) |
| 1967–1970 | Gimnasia y Esgrima (LP) | 42 | (18) |
| 1969 | → América de Cali (loan) | 41 | (24) |
| 1971–1972 | Cúcuta Deportivo | 78 | (59) |
| 1973–1976 | Atlético Nacional | 164 | (76) |
| 1977–1979 | Independiente Medellín | 49 | (29) |
| 1979–1980 | Deportivo Pereira | 24 | (14) |
| 1981 | Cúcuta Deportivo | 13 | (3) |
| Total | | 411 | (223) |

International career
| 1975 | Colombia | 4 | (0) |
- * Club domestic league appearances and goals

Hugo Horacio Lóndero Secullini (born 18 September 1946) is an Argentine-born Colombian retired footballer. He is the fourth top goalscorer of the Colombian Primera A with 211 goals. He played for Colombia at 1975 Copa América, and scored one goal in an unofficial match against Brazil.

== Honours ==
=== Club ===
América de Cali

- Categoría Primera A top goalscorer (1): 1969

Atlético Nacional

- Categoría Primera A (2): 1973, 1976

Cúcuta Deportivo

- Categoría Primera A top goalscorer (2): 1971, 1972
