= Juan Carlos Lallana =

Argentine footballer (1938–2022)

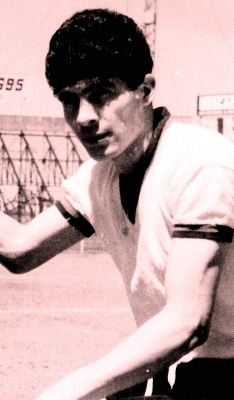

Personal information
- Full name: Juan Carlos Lallana Morales
- Date of birth: 24 December 1938
- Place of birth: Rosario, Argentina
- Date of death: 15 February 2022 (aged 83)
- Place of death: Rosario, Argentina
- Position: Forward

Senior career*
Years	Team	Apps	(Gls)
1956	Unión de Santa Fe		
1957–1959	San Lorenzo		
1960	Newell's Old Boys		
1961	Lanús		
1962–1963	Argentinos Juniors		
1964–1967	River Plate		
1968–1970	Deportivo Cali		
1970–1971	Atlético Nacional		
1972	Independiente Medellín		
1973	Banfield		

International career
1963–1965	Argentina	5	(3)
Medal record
Men's football
Representing Argentina
South American Championship
Third place	1963 Bolivia
- * Club domestic league appearances and goals

Juan Carlos Lallana (24 December 1938 – 15 February 2022) was an Argentine footballer who played as a forward. He made five appearances for the Argentina national team from 1963 to 1965. He was also part of Argentina's squad for the 1963 South American Championship. Lallana died on 15 February 2022, at the age of 83.

== Honours ==
San Lorenzo

- Primera División: 1959

Deportivo Cali

- Categoría Primera A: 1969
