= La Paz F.C. (Colombia) =

La Paz F.C. is a Colombian amateur football club based in Bogotá, Colombia. Founded in 2017 as an initiative to promote peace and reintegration of demobilised members from the Revolutionary Armed Forces of Colombia (FARC).

== History ==
The concept for La Paz F.C. emerged in the aftermath of the 2016 peace agreement between the Colombian government and the FARC, promoted by human rights lawyer Félix Mora, president of the Fundación Fútbol y Paz (Football and Peace Foundation). An agreement was signed between the foundation and FARC leaders to create a football team that would begin at the amateur level, with the long-term goal of competing in Colombia’s second division, as well as in youth (U-20) and women's leagues.

The club was officially established in September 2017 and received official sports recognition in 2018. The initiative has received support from several institutions, including the Colombian government and international organizations such as FIFA, which has recognized the club’s contribution to peacebuilding.

La Paz F.C. has participated in international tournaments, such as the World Meeting for Peace in France, where it played against teams including Bayeux F.C. and a Normandy regional selection.
