= Jorge Cáceres (footballer) =

Argentinian-born Colombian footballer (1948–2025)

Personal information
- Full name: Jorge Ramón Cáceres
- Date of birth: 7 January 1948
- Place of birth: Santiago del Estero, Argentina
- Date of death: 8 January 2025 (aged 77)
- Place of death: Santiago del Estero, Argentina
- Position: Forward

Senior career*
Years	Team	Apps	(Gls)
1970–1973	San Martín de Tucumán		
1973	→ América de Cali (loan)		(8)
1973	América de Cali		(10)
1974	Bucaramanga		
1975	Deportivo Pereira		(35)
1976–1981	América de Cali		(117)

International career
1977	Colombia	6	(0)
- * Club domestic league appearances and goals

Jorge Ramón Cáceres (7 January 1948 – 8 January 2025) was an Argentine-born Colombian professional footballer who played as a forward. Born in Argentina, he played club football in Argentina and Colombia, and represented Colombia at international level.

== Career ==
Born in Santiago del Estero, Argentina, Cáceres began his professional football career with San Martín de Tucumán. In 1973, San Martín sent him on loan to América de Cali for one season, but the club soon made the transfer to América permanent. He also played for Atlético Bucaramanga and Deportivo Pereira in Colombia.

Cáceres was a prolific goal-scorer. He scored in 24 consecutive matches, and led the league with 35 goals while playing for Pereira in 1975. He is one of the all-time leading Colombian league goal-scorers with 182 goals.

In 1976, Cáceres became a naturalized Colombian citizen. He made six appearances for the Colombia national team in 1977.

== Death ==
Cáceres died on 8 January 2025, one day after his 77th birthday.
