= Hernán Ramírez Villegas Stadium =

Football stadium in Pereira, Colombia

Coordinates: 4.804804°N 75.75219°W

Estadio Hernán Ramírez Villegas
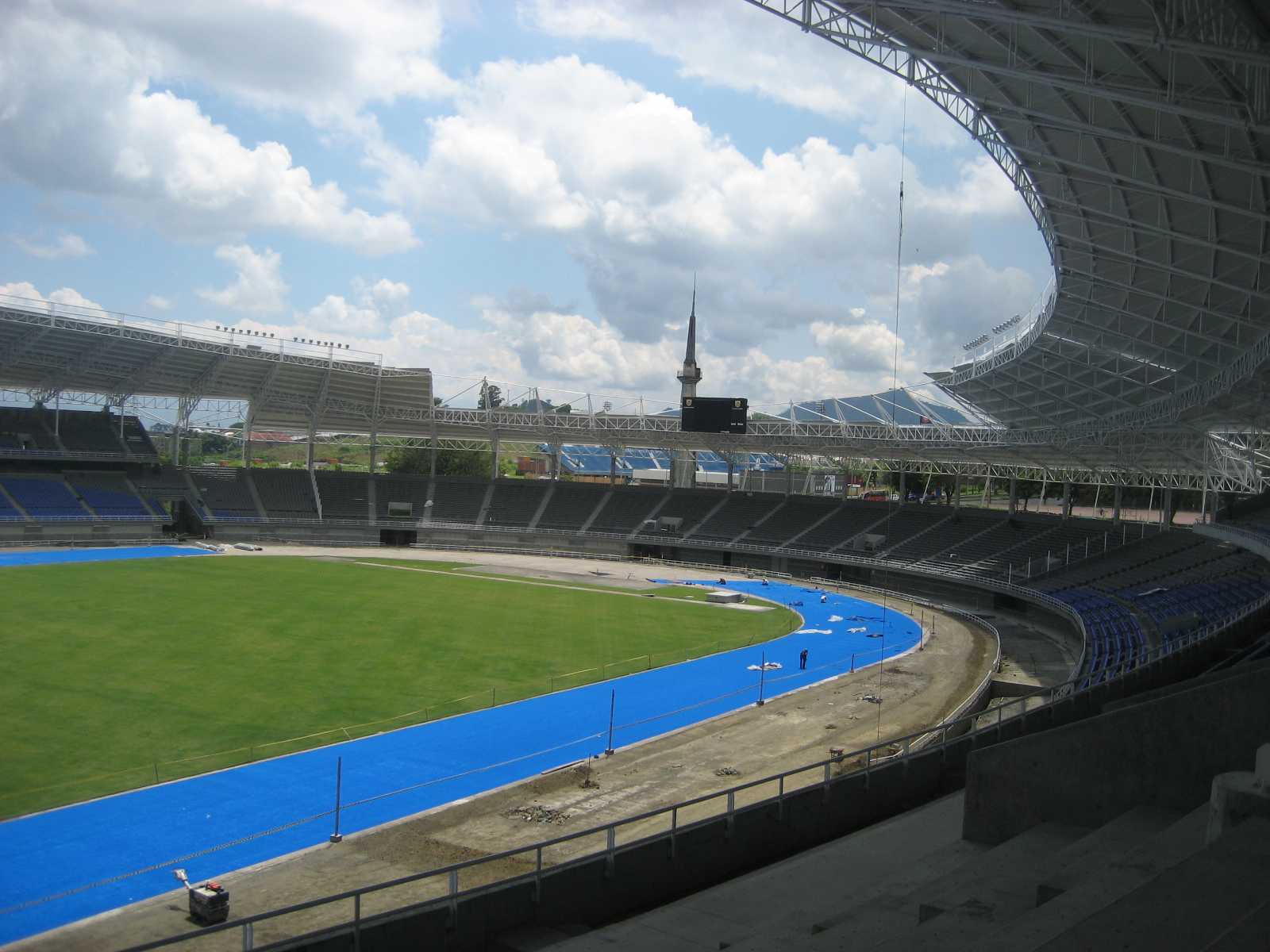
- Interactive map of Estadio Hernán Ramírez Villegas
- Full name: Estadio Hernán Ramírez Villegas
- Location: Pereira, Colombia
- Owner: Municipality of Pereira
- Capacity: 30,297
- Surface: Naturalis herba
- Field size: 105 m × 70 m (344 ft × 230 ft)

Construction
- Opened: 1 May 1971
- Renovated: 2011
- Cost: 17 200 000 USD (2011)
- Architect: Hernán Ramírez Villegas

Tenant
- Deportivo Pereira (1971–)

Estadio Hernán Ramírez Villegas is a multi-purpose stadium in Pereira, Colombia. It is currently used mostly for football matches. It is also the home of Deportivo Pereira. The stadium holds 30,297 people. The stadium was built in 1971. The stadium was under reconstruction for the FIFA U-20 World Cup in 2011.
