= Atanasio Girardot Stadium =

Stadium in Medellín, Colombia

Coordinates: 6°15′24.48″N 75°35′24.62″W

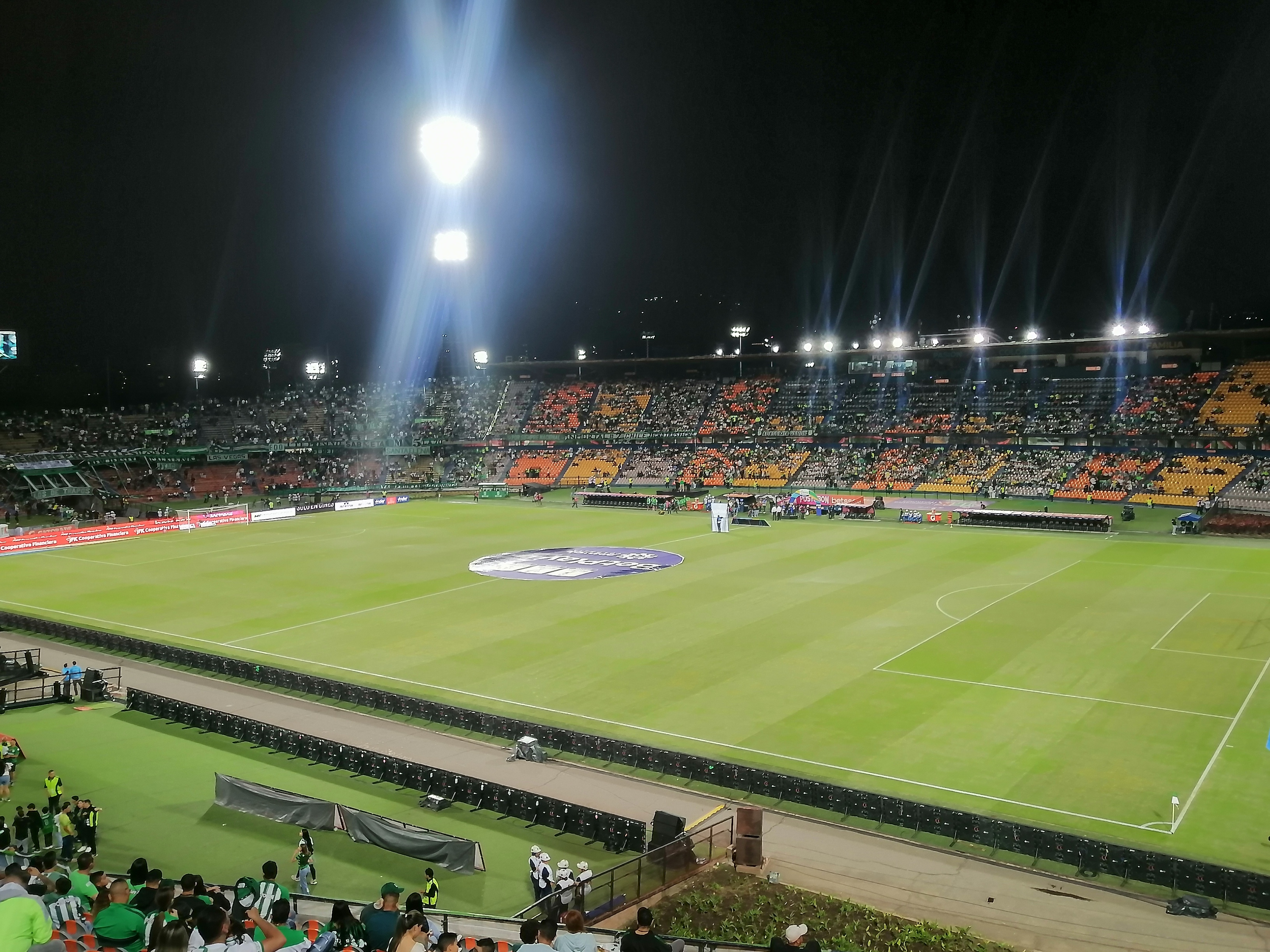
- Interactive map of Atanasio Girardot Stadium
- Full name: Unidad Deportiva Atanasio Girardot
- Location: Medellín, Colombia
- Operator: INDER Medellin
- Capacity: 44,826

Construction
- Opened: 19 March 1953
- Renovated: 2011

Tenants
- Atlético Nacional (1953–present); Independiente Medellín (1953–present)

Atanasio Girardot Stadium (Spanish: Estadio Atanasio Girardot), commonly referred to as El Atanasio, is a multi-purpose stadium in Medellín, Colombia.

Located in the Laureles comuna of Medellin, the stadium is currently used mostly for football matches by Atlético Nacional and Independiente Medellín, the most popular clubs in the Antioquia Department. On occasion, the stadium has held Colombia national team matches too.

Its current capacity is 44,826 which ranks as the third largest in the country behind Estadio Deportivo Cali and Estadio Metropolitano Roberto Meléndez. The stadium was named after Atanasio Girardot, a Colombian revolutionary leader who fought alongside Simón Bolívar.

The stadium is part of the Atanasio Girardot Sports Complex.

== History ==
The stadium was inaugurated on 19 March 1953 with a friendly match between Antioquia XI and Mexican side Club América.

It was renovated for the 2011 FIFA U-20 World Cup to the capacity of 40,943. The renovations also included the removal of the high fencing around the pitch, the removal of the running track, and the painting of seats.

In 2021, the stadium was renovated to prepare for the 2021 Copa América, which was originally to be held in Argentina and Colombia. However, the tournament was moved to Brazil. The renovations cost around $11 million and included more press boxes, more luxury boxes, better lighting, seating replacements, and bathroom renovations.

In 2025, a $196 million renovation was announced that would increase the capacity to 60,000, making it the largest stadium in Colombia. Additional improvements for the stadium include increased toilets and turnstiles, renovation of commercial spaces, press boxes, dressing rooms, VIP boxes, seating, modernised electrical and plumbing systems, an improved playing pitch, a new façade spanning over 23,000 square metres, and will be designed to meet FIFA standards. Construction is scheduled for May or June 2026 with competition in the second half of 2027 once the necessary permits are acquired.

== Concerts ==
Date	Event	Attendance	Type	Note
April 16, 1998	Maná	—	Concert	
April 18 and November 14, 1996	Shakira		Concert	Sold-out shows
April 1, 2003	Maná	30,000	Concert	
October 22, 2005	RBD	30,000	Concert	Sold-out show
August 7, 2009	Aventura & Daddy Yankee	33,000	Concert	
August 27, 2010	Alejandro Fernández & Marc Anthony	—	Concert	
March 1, 2012	Maná	20,000	Concert	
November 28–29, 2012	Madonna	90,000	Concert	Sold-out shows
September 22, 2013	Beyoncé	43,000	Concert	Sold-out show
November 23, 2016	Guns N' Roses	41,511	Concert	Sold-out show
November 30, 2019	J Balvin	45,000	Concert	
December 4–5, 2021	Karol G	63,568	Concert	Sold-out shows
April 30, 2022	Maluma	54,000	Concert	
October 14–16, 2022	Daddy Yankee	98,288	Concert	
November 18–19, 2022	Bad Bunny	80,393	Concert	Sold-out shows
November 3–6, 2023	RBD	150,000	Concert	Sold-out shows
February 23, 2025	Shakira		Concert	Sold-out show
January 23–25, 2026	Bad Bunny		Concert	Sold-out shows

== Sporting events held ==
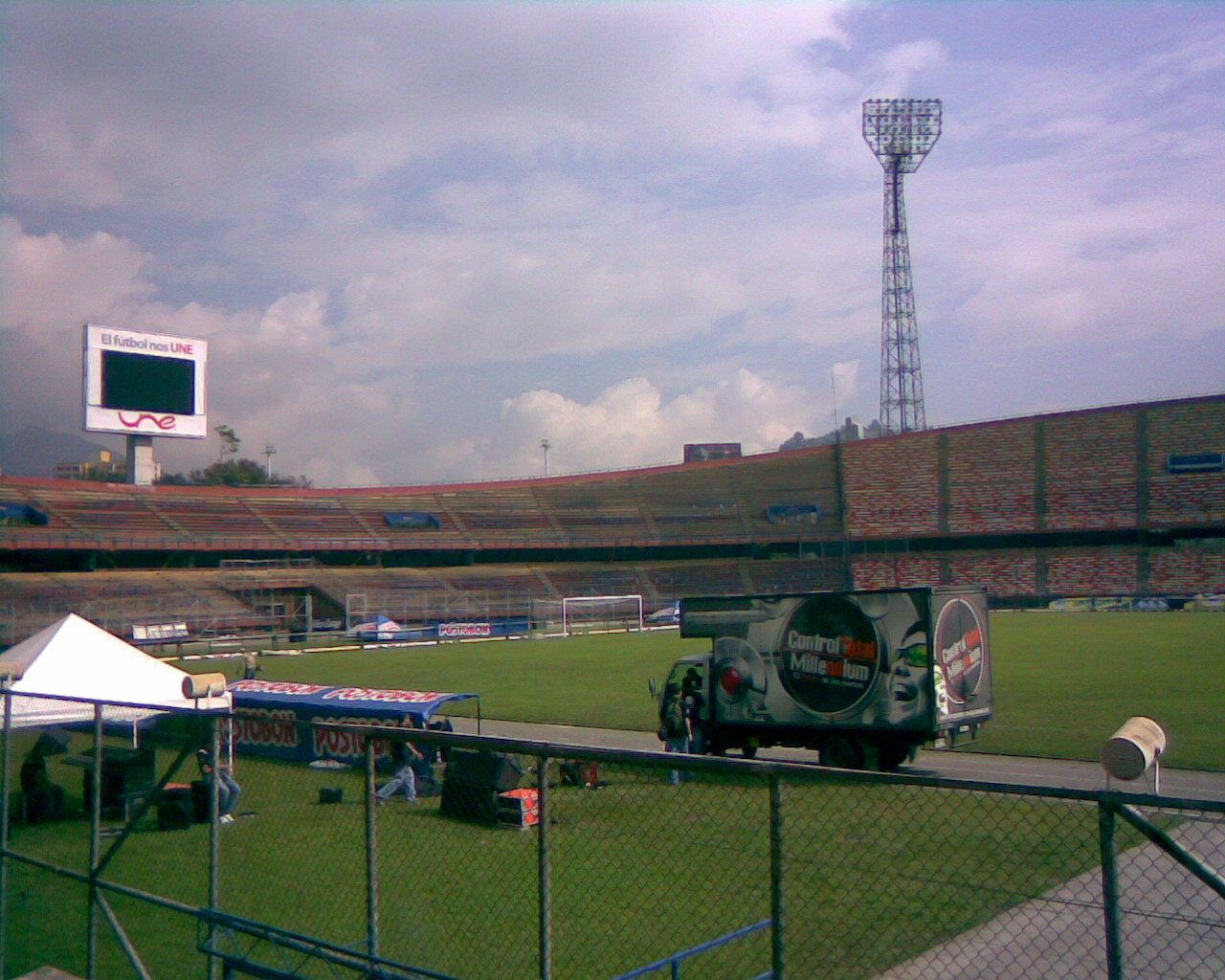
The stadium in 2010, before it was remodeled.

The stadium has hosted many sporting events:

- 1978 Central American and Caribbean Games
- 2001 Copa América
- 2010 South American Games
- 2011 FIFA U-20 World Cup
- 2024 FIFA U-20 Women's World Cup

== Transport ==
The stadium has its own station on line B of the Medellín Metro, which is named Estadio.

== Average attendances ==
Tenants	League season	Home games	Average attendance
Atlético Nacional	2023 Clausura	10	16,809
Independiente Medellín	2023 Clausura	10	12,449
Atlético Nacional	2023 Apertura	8	24,771
Independiente Medellín	2023 Apertura	10	20,524

== See also ==
- List of football stadiums in Colombia
- Lists of stadiums
