= Romelio Martínez Stadium =

Sports stadium in Barranquilla, Colombia

Estadio Romelio Martínez
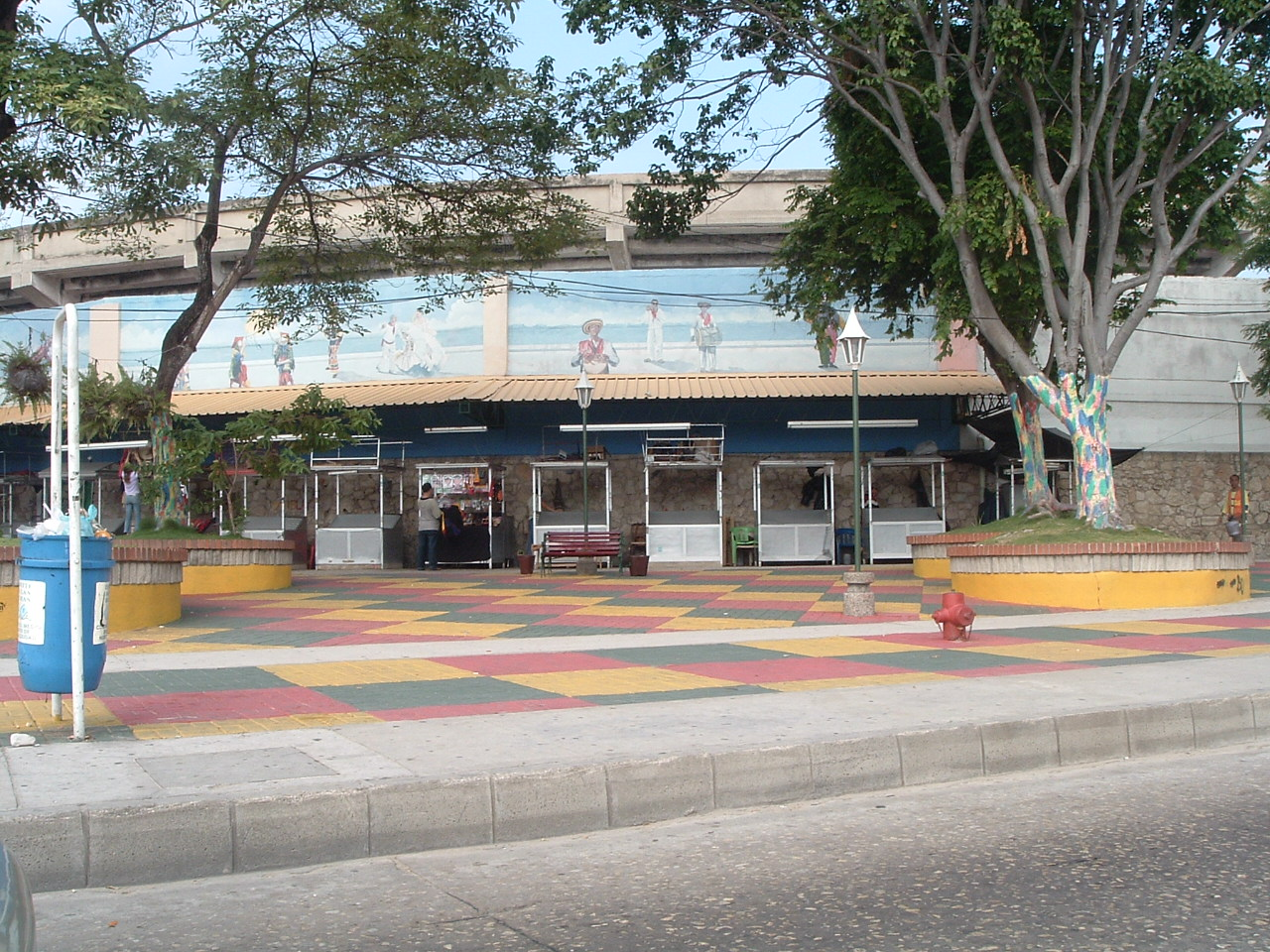
- Interactive map of Estadio Romelio Martínez
- Full name: Plaza de eventos del estadio Romelio Martínez
- Location: Barranquilla, Colombia
- Coordinates: 10°59′38″N 74°48′25″W
- Capacity: 8,600

Construction
- Opened: 1934
- Cost: US$120,000

Tenants
- Barranquilla F.C. Junior F.C. (formerly)

The Estadio Romelio Martínez, or Romelio Martínez Stadium, is a sports stadium located at 72 street and 46 Avenue in the Colombian city of Barranquilla. It has a capacity of 8,600 spectators.

Until the construction of the Estadio Metropolitano Roberto Meléndez in 1986, the Romelio Martínez had been the city's primary stadium. It is currently the home of the Barranquilla F.C. soccer team, which plays in the Colombian second division.

== History ==
The project was conceived on 1932, because that year the National Games of Colombia were to be made in Barranquilla and was built in the ground that occupied the "Estadio Juana de Arco". The stadium was finished on 1934 with the name of "Estadio Municipal" (Municipal Stadium). The initial capacity of the stadium was of 10,000 spectators. Has a wooden structure that support the deck of the grandstand and the architectural stadium's style is Art Deco.

The Romelio Martínez Stadium hosted the 1935 National Games and the V Central American and Caribbean Games in 1946.

Since the birth of the professional football in Barranquilla on 1948, they have needed to enlarge the capacity of the stadium because there are so many fans of the local team of the city that want to see the soccer games. So many fans that the crowd would constantly exceed the stadiums capacity, creating long lines at the entry since the first hours of the day.
