= Estadio Eduardo Santos =

Multi-use stadium in Santa Marta, Colombia

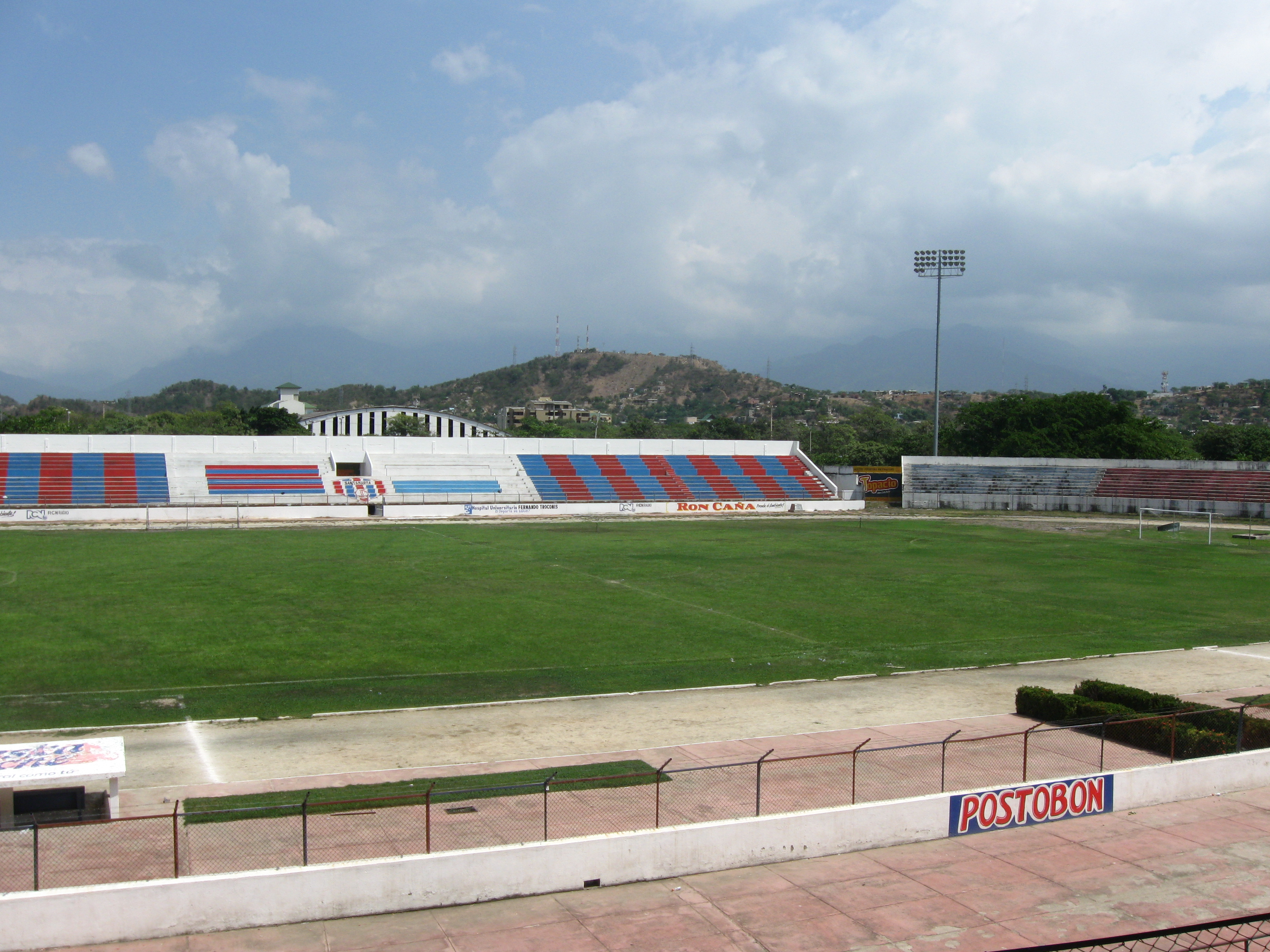
- Estadio Eduardo Santos
- Interactive map of Estadio Eduardo Santos
- Location: Santa Marta, Colombia
- Coordinates: 11.2398262°N 74.1951263°W
- Capacity: 23,000
- Surface: grass

Construction
- Built: 1951
- Opened: 1951
- Expanded: 1998
- Closed: 2013

Tenant
- Unión Magdalena (formerly)

Estadio Eduardo Santos is a multi-use stadium in Santa Marta, Colombia, used mostly for football matches. It is the largest sports facility in Magdalena Department with a maximum capacity of 23,000 people. The stadium is named after politician and publisher Eduardo Santos, President of the Republic of Colombia from 1938 to 1942.

== Unión Magdalena ==
Since its opening in 1951, Estadio Eduardo Santos has been home to the football club Unión Magdalena, and witnessed the birth of prominent figures of Colombian football, including former captain Colombia Carlos 'El pibe' ('The Kid') Valderrama. In 2002, a monumental sculpture of Carlos Valderrama was unveiled at the stadium entrance in a grand ceremony with fireworks attended by about 14,000 people, including 3,000 special guests. The 6.5 meter high, eight ton monument sculpted by Amilkar Ariza, is considered the world's largest bronze for a footballer. It has become the most visited sculpture in Santa Marta.

In 1968, with a final game against Deportivo Cali played in the Eduardo Santos Stadium, Union Magdalena won its first and only Colombian Football League Championship to date. During the celebration a motor vehicle accident took the life of a fan in the caravan of triumph, and it is said that Magdalena can never again rise to champion due to the "Curse of the Celebration.”

== Renovations ==
1998 - With an investment of 340 million pesos, the capacity of the stadium's South Stand was increased by 3,700 spectators.

2008 - A government initiative to restructure the system was launched in response to poor stadium conditions that had resulted from years of neglect.

2013 - On March 3, the Unión Magdalena played their last game in the stadium against Llaneros FC, in compliance with the order to permanently close the Eduardo Santos due to precarious safety conditions for those attending. Plans were announced for an investment of 20,000 million pesos in a new stadium Eduardo Santos on the same site, with input from the National Government.

2014 - Plans are in progress to construct the new football stadium in time for the Bolivarian Games 2017. The new stadium is to be relocated to the Villa Deportiva Bolivariana. A center for indoor sports such as gymnastics, boxing, and weightlifting is to be built at the current site of Estadio Eduardo Santos, which will be demolished due to deterioration of its physical infrastructure.

== See also ==
- List of football stadiums in Colombia
