= Estadio Palogrande =

Football stadium in Manizales, Colombia

Palogrande Stadium
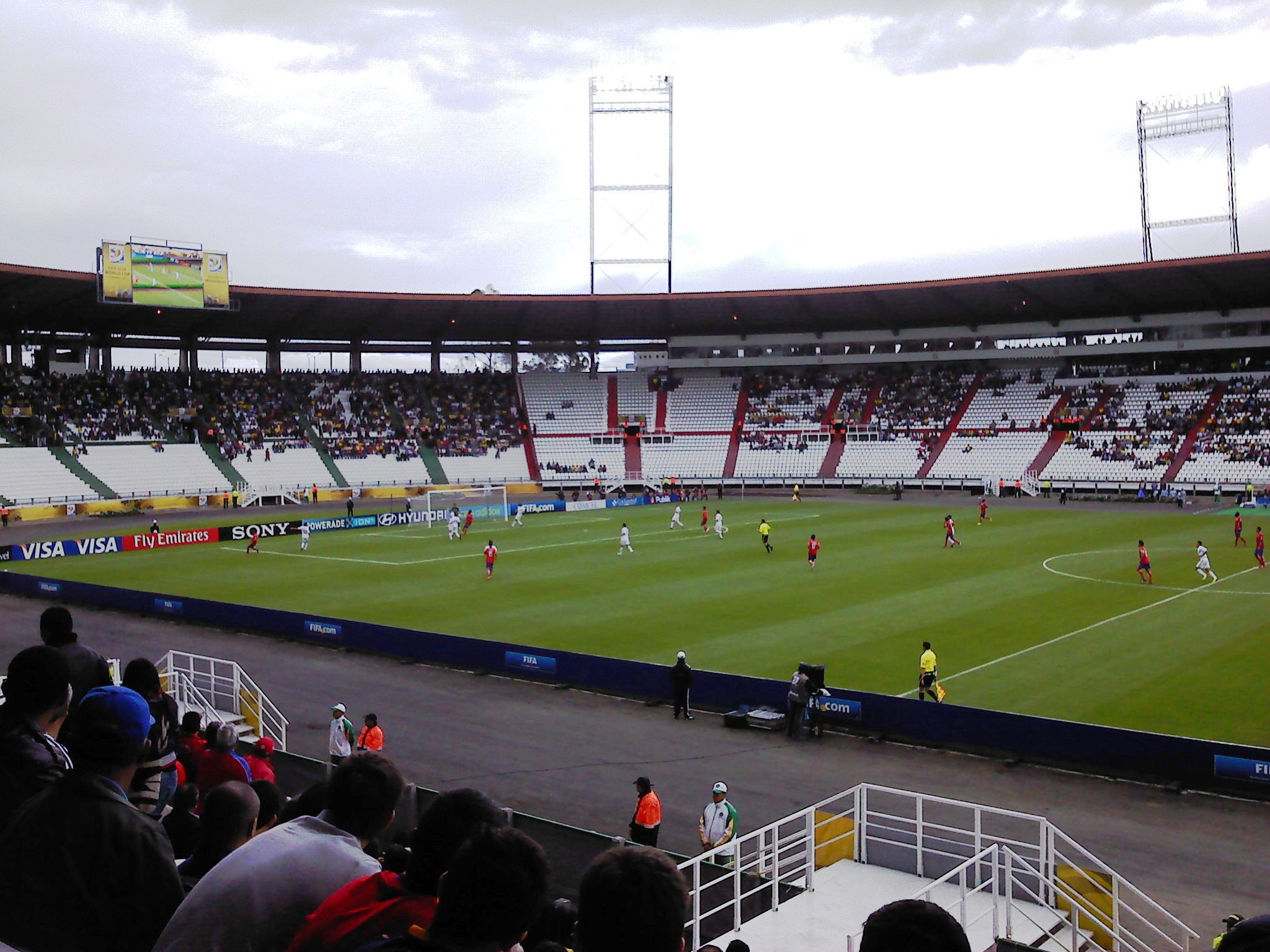
- Estadio Palogrande inside
- Interactive map of Palogrande Stadium
- Location: Manizales, Colombia
- Coordinates: 5.056233°N 75.489807°W
- Owner: Municipality of Manizales
- Capacity: 31,611
- Surface: Kikuyu Grass
- Field size: 110 x 70 m

Construction
- Opened: 1936 (first stadium); July 30, 1994 (current stadium)
- Renovated: 2010-2011, 2019 (current stadium)
- Demolished: 1993 (first stadium)
- Cost: $ 5,500 million pesos (1994)
- Architects: Jorge Gutiérrez Duque and Enrique Gómez Gómez

Tenant
- Once Caldas

Estadio Palogrande is a multi-purpose stadium in Manizales, Colombia with a capacity of 31,611. It is currently used mostly for football (soccer) matches as home venue of the Once Caldas, winners of the 2004 Copa Libertadores.

== History ==
The first Palogrande was built in 1936 and demolished in 1993, and the current Palogrande was inaugurated in 1994.

With renovations made for the 2011 FIFA U-20 World Cup in Colombia, the stadium capacity dropped from 42,678 to 32,000 people, although it was capped at 28,678 for the tournament.

== See also ==
- Lists of stadiums
