= Estadio Manuel Murillo Toro =

Soccer stadium in Ibagué, Colombia

- Estadio Manuel Murillo Toro
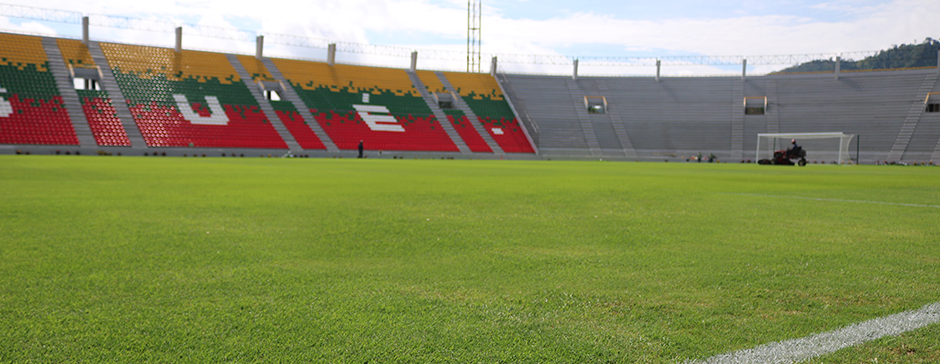
- Interactive map of Estadio Manuel Murillo Toro
- Full name: Estadio Manuel Murillo Toro
- Location: Ibagué, Colombia
- Coordinates: 4.429509°N 75.218325°W
- Owner: IMDRI
- Capacity: 28,100
- Field size: 105m x 68 metres

Construction
- Built: 1956
- Opened: 20 July 1955
- Architect: Bernardo Telo

Tenant
- Deportes Tolima

The Estadio Manuel Murillo Toro is a sports arena located in Ibagué, capital of the department of Tolima. It currently has a capacity of 28,100 spectators.

The stadium, whose main use is for football, is used by Colombian Categoría Primera A team Deportes Tolima for its home matches. It is known to be the place where Brazilian player Ronaldo played the last game of his professional career on February 2, 2011, with Corinthians against Deportes Tolima in the 2011 Copa Libertadores.

== History ==
These were years of campaigns, meetings and activities to bring a longing ibaguereños and tolimenses come true, although the department still did not have professional squad, the idea of the creation of the team gave further impetus to the project. The newspaper El Comercio, edition of June 23, 1951 recorded the great "week Pro-stadium" event that took place between June 28 and July 8 of that year, with a parade of athletes, sports days and the great encounter between professional teams Millionaires and Bucaramanga. In a friendly match of the teams Deportes Quindio (professional) and Boca Juniors (amateur) Ibague on January 19, 1955, was determined to do the work when the famous court in Bethlehem touched himself Civil Military Chief Augusto Cesar Cuellar Velandia the match for nearly two hours of feet, when I take Humberto Gonzalez Ruiz to suggest the president the need for a stadium to Ibague. The newspaper La Epoca, led by Adriano Tribin Piedrahita, edition 105 of October 12, 1954 recorded a meeting of personalities, led by the Governor Cesar Cuellar Velandia, Mayor Lysimachus Parra Bernal, Secretary Bernardo Tello works and sports leaders, according to the newspaper, to define the site where the stadium would be built. According to the note, the Government of Tolima contributed 10,000 pesos and 7000 that were held by Nicholas Rivera, treasurer and great campaigner Pro-stadium. It was built in the July 20, 1955 in a record time of 55 days with the name Gustavo Rojas Pinilla stadium on a lot donated by the city of Avila Serrano. Its initial capacity was 3,000 spectators and the opening match between Boca Juniors and Deportes Tolima of Cali held on July 20, 1955, ended with away win Boca Juniors de Cali 3–2. It was listed as one of the most unusual stadiums in the country for not having protective mesh for fans as well as being the first to have direct tunnel onto the field. Thus, since 2000 has been held a total rebuild and modernize the regulation required by FIFA, in which the government, the town hall, and Gabriel Camargo Salamanca Coldeportes have contributed to achieve this worthy goal. In the last remodeling advance adequacy backstage, technical benches, lighting and made the expansion of the north stand. In December 2024, the stadium was used as a pilot venue for facial recognition and biometric identity verification systems during the Colombian football final between Atlético Nacional and Deportes Tolima. According to Colombia’s National Civil Registry, the initiative aimed to strengthen access control and public security measures during large-scale sporting events.

== Remodeling ==
The first building of the stadium was made for 3,000. Then was expanded to 18,000 which took place in the years before the National Games in 1970, currently has a capacity to accommodate 28,180 fans.

- For the National Games in 1970, Murillo Toro, who at the time was named St. Boniface, was the subject of his first spare and that's when he had the best infrastructure to house the first national fair.
- After the fall of western grandstand in 1981 it was decided to leave one story, and since the late 1990s work began to expand the eastern grandstand.
- After a bidding process in July last year International Power Company was responsible for the installation of 103 new fixtures, type 2000W Arena Vision and rush for them, which had an estimated cost of 340 million pesos.
- By criticism of the CONMEBOL regarding the lighting was decided to improve the lighting of the stadium, in the process of adapting the new lights were failures. Even in a night game of the Copa Colombia, between Tolima and Atletico Nacional, on September 6, the system collapsed due to overload one of the transformers. Currently, the director of the agency in charge of Murillo Toro said the participation of Deportes Tolima in the Copa Libertadores lights are in perfect condition. The lighting was at 260 lumen and happened to have a capacity of 750 lumen.
- After more than two years of work, the north stand would be fully enabled in this semester, with new locations, such as the dependence of firefighters, nurses and police command. However, have yet to solve moisture problems that arise between the old and new structure, which have caused some puddles on the premises.
- In 2015, the stadium underwent remodeling works ahead of the 2015 National Games of Colombia. 13 billion COP were invested in the replacement of the playing surface and its expansion, as well as dressing rooms and installation of seats. The stadium's capacity was reduced to 28,100 spectators. This was a first stage of works, and in the future it is expected that the whole stadium can meet FIFA-type requirements.

== Name ==
The stadium has changed names several times over its history: initially called Gustavo Rojas Pinilla in honor of General President of the Republic at the time, later became known as St. Boniface in honor of the city (founded as San Bonifacio de Ibague) and currently Manuel Murillo Toro in honor of the politician and writer who was president of the republic on two occasions.

== Events ==
This scenario has had the opportunity to receive all kinds of sporting and cultural events: intercollegiate competitions, national games, the folk festival, among others. Regarding the Deportes Tolima The Manuel Murillo Toro has received an end of the first B 1994, Merconorte late 1997 and 1998, the finals of the Copa Mustang 2003-II, the final 2006-II and Postobon League final 2010-II in terms of the continental tournaments Copa Libertadores 2004, 2007,2010,2013; Copa Sudamericana 2006,2010,2012 today is the home of Deportes Tolima playing in the Primera A Colombian professional football.

- 1996 Copa CONMEBOL
- 1997 Copa CONMEBOL
- Copa Libertadores 2004
- Copa Libertadores 2007
- Copa Libertadores 2011
- Copa Sudamericana 2006
- Copa Sudamericana 2010
- Copa Sudamericana 2012
