= Estadio General Santander =

Multi-purpose stadium in Cúcuta, Colombia

Coordinates: 7.894478°N 72.501717°W

General Santander Stadium
- "Fortin Motilón"
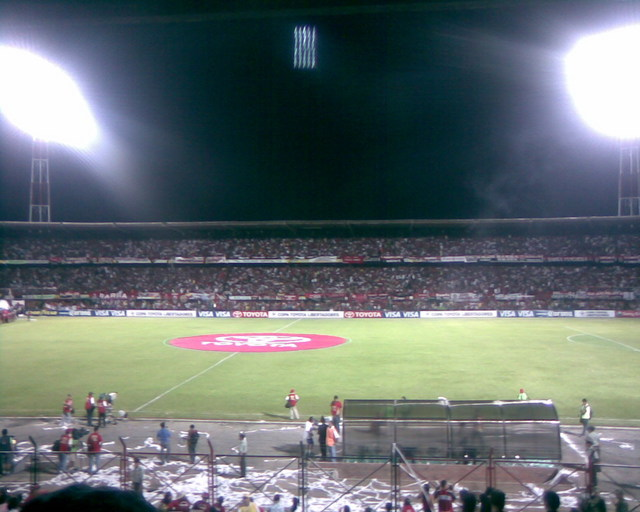
- Interactive map of General Santander Stadium
- Location: Cúcuta, Colombia
- Owner: Department Hall of Norte de Santander
- Operator: Municipal Institute of Recreation and Sport
- Capacity: 32,163
- Surface: Grass

Construction
- Groundbreaking: 1948
- Opened: 1948
- Renovated: 1989, 2006

Tenant
- Cúcuta Deportivo

General Santander Stadium (Estadio General Santander) is a multi-purpose stadium in Cúcuta, Colombia. It is currently used mostly for football matches. The stadium has a capacity of 32,163 people. It is named in honour of Francisco de Paula Santander.
