= List of Independiente Santa Fe managers =

Independiente Santa Fe is an association football club based in Bogotá, that competes in the Categoría Primera A, the top level football league in Colombia. Santa Fe was founded on February 28, 1941, and played its first league match on 15 August 1948, in a 2–2 draw with Deportes Caldas. As of 2013, Santa Fe is one of the teams never to have been relegated from the top level of Colombian football.

The club has won the Categoría Primera A 9 times (1948, 1958, 1960, 1966, 1971, 1975, 2012–I, 2014–II, 2016–II), the Copa Colombia 2 times (1989, 2009), the Colombian Superliga 4 times (2013, 2015, 2017, 2021), the Copa Sudamericana once (2015) and the Suruga Bank Championship once (2016) too. The next table details the club's achievements since its formation in 1941.

== List of managers ==
Dates	Name	Notes
1942	(England) Jack Greenwell	
1947–1948	(Peru) Carlos Carrillo Nalda	Obtained the 1948 Campeonato Profesional
1949–1950	(Spain) José Castillo	
1950–1951	(Romania) Adam Belitoreau	
1951	(Argentina) René Pontoni	
1951	(Argentina) Oscar Sabransky	
1952–1953	(Argentina) Alfredo Cuezzo	
1954–1955	(Colombia) Jorge Peñaranda	
1956–1957	(Colombia) Antonio Julio de la Hoz	
1958	(Argentina) Julio Tocker	Obtained the 1958 Campeonato Profesional
1959	(Argentina) Juan José Ferraro	
1960	(Argentina) Julio Tocker	Obtained the 1960 Campeonato Profesional
1961–1962	(Socialist Federal Republic of Yugoslavia) (Argentina) Rodolfo Kralj	
1963	(Brazil) Olten Ayres de Abreu	
1964	(Argentina) Juan Montero	
1964	(Argentina) Juan Carlos Pellegrino	
1964	(Argentina) Julio Tocker	
1965–1967	(Colombia) Gabriel Ochoa Uribe	Obtained the 1966 Campeonato Profesional
1967	(Colombia) Luis Alberto Rubio	
1968	(Colombia) Gabriel Ochoa Uribe	
1968	(Colombia) Luis Alberto Rubio	
1968	(Colombia) Antonio Julio de la Hoz	
1968–1969	(Argentina) Rubén Bravo	
1969–1971	(Socialist Federal Republic of Yugoslavia) Todor Veselinović	Obtained the 1970 Copa Simón Bolívar (Venezuela)
1971–1972	(Socialist Federal Republic of Yugoslavia) Vladica Popović	Obtained the 1971 Campeonato Profesional
1973	(England) John Evans	
1973–1974	(Socialist Federal Republic of Yugoslavia) Dušan Nenković	
1975–1976	(Chile) Francisco Hormazábal	Obtained the 1975 Campeonato Profesional
1977–1978	(Argentina) Miguel Ángel Basílico	
1979	(Colombia) Leonel Montoya	
1979–1981	(Colombia) Alonso Rodríguez	
1981	(Argentina) Juan Carlos Sarnari	
1982	(Socialist Federal Republic of Yugoslavia) Simo Vilić	
1982	(Colombia) Luis Eduardo Soto	
1983	(Argentina) Juan Ricardo Faccio	
1983	(Argentina) Juan Eulogio Urriolabeitía	
1984	(Colombia) Justo Lopera	
1984	(Argentina) Juan Carlos Lorenzo	
1985	(Argentina) Eduardo Manera	
1986–1987	(Colombia) Jorge Luis Pinto	
1988–1989	(Colombia) Diego Umaña	
1989–1991	(Colombia) Héctor Javier Céspedes	
1991–1993	(Colombia) Jorge Luis Pinto	
1993	(Argentina) Roberto Perfumo	
1993–1994	(Colombia) Arturo Boyacá	
1995–1996	(Uruguay) (Colombia) Julio Avelino Comesaña	
1996–1998	(Argentina) (Italy) Pablo Centrone	
1999–2001	(Colombia) Fernando Castro	
2002	(Serbia and Montenegro) Dragan Miranović	
2003	(Colombia) Arturo Boyacá	
2003	(Colombia) Hébert Ríos	
2003	(Argentina) (Colombia) Julio Avelino Comesaña	
2004	(Colombia) Jaime de la Pava	
2005–2006	(Colombia) Germán González	
2006	(Argentina) Ricardo Gareca	
2006–2007	(Colombia) Pedro Sarmiento	
2008	(Colombia) Fernando Castro	
2008–2009	(Colombia) Hernán Darío Gómez	
2009–2010	(Colombia) Germán González	Obtained the 2009 Copa Colombia
2010–2011	(Colombia) Néstor Otero	
2011	(Colombia) Arturo Boyacá	
2011–2014	(Colombia) Wilson Gutiérrez	Obtained the 2012 Categoría Primera A season and 2013 Superliga Colombiana
2014–2015	(Argentina) Gustavo Costas	Obtained the 2014 Categoría Primera A season and 2015 Superliga Colombiana
2015–2016	(Uruguay) Gerardo Pelusso	Obtained the 2015 Copa Sudamericana
2016	(Colombia) Alexis García	
2016–2017	(Argentina) Gustavo Costas	Obtained the 2016 Suruga Bank Championship, 2016 Categoría Primera A season and 2017 Superliga Colombiana
2017–2018	(Uruguay) Gregorio Pérez	
2018–2019	(Uruguay) (Italy) Guillermo Sanguinetti	
2019	(Colombia) Gerardo Bedoya	
2019	(Colombia) Agustín Julio	
2019	(Argentina) Patricio Camps	
2019–2021	(Colombia) Harold Rivera	
2021	(Colombia) Grigori Méndez	Obtained the 2021 Superliga Colombiana
2021–2022	(Argentina) (Italy) Martín Cardetti	
2022	(Colombia) Agustín Julio	
2022	(Uruguay) (Spain) Alfredo Arias	
2022–2023	(Colombia) Harold Rivera	
2023	(Colombia) Gerardo Bedoya	
2023	(Colombia) Hubert Bodhert	
2023-2025	(Uruguay) Pablo Peirano	
2025	(Colombia) Francisco López	
2025-	(Uruguay) Jorge Bava	

Source: Worldfootball.net
