= List of Independiente Santa Fe seasons =

Independiente Santa Fe is an association football club based in Bogotá, that competes in the Categoría Primera A, the top level football league in Colombia. Santa Fe was founded on February 28, 1941, and played its first league match on 15 August 1948, in a 2–2 draw with Deportes Caldas. As of 2014, Santa Fe is one of the teams never to have been relegated from the top level of Colombian football.

The club has won the Categoría Primera A 7 times, the Copa Colombia 2 times and the Colombian Superliga 1 time. The next table details the club's achievements since its formation in 1941.

== Key ==
Key to league:

- P = Played
- W = Games won
- D = Games drawn
- L = Games lost
- F = Goals scored
- A = Goals against
- Pts = Points
- Pos = Final position

Key to other competitions:

- W = Champion
- RU = Final (Runner-up)
- SF = Semi-finals
- QF = Quarter-finals
- R16/R32 = Round of 16, Round of 32

Champions	Runners-up	Qualified	Top scorer

== Seasons (League) ==
S	League (First stage)									League (Semifinals)								League (Finals)			Top goalscorer(s)	
S	Division	P	W	D	L	F	A	Pts	Pos	P	W	D	L	F	A	Pts	Pos	F	A	Pos	Name(s)	G
1948 Details	Campeonato Profesional	18	12	3	3	57	29	27	1st	Round-robin format											(Spain) Jesús María Lires	20
1949	Campeonato Profesional	26	17	5	4	102	50	39	3rd	Round-robin format											(Argentina) Germán Antón	30
1950	Campeonato Profesional	30	12	8	10	67	59	32	8th	Round-robin format											(Argentina) Germán Antón	9
1951	Campeonato Profesional	34	14	9	11	90	75	37	6th	Round-robin format											(Argentina) René Pontoni	21
2012-I	Categoría Primera A	18	7	8	3	29	19	29	2nd	6	4	2	0	10	6	14	1st	2	1	W	(Bolivia) Diego Cabrera	9

== Seasons (other) ==
South America		Other	
Competition	Result	Competition	Result
