= 1948 Independiente Santa Fe season =

Independiente Santa Fe
1948 season
- Chairman: (Colombia) Gonzalo Rueda
- Manager: (Peru) Carlos Carrillo
- Stadium: Alfonso López Pumarejo
- Campeonato Profesional: 1st
- Top goalscorer: League: (Spain) Jesús María Lires (20); All: (Spain) Jesús María Lires (20)
Home colours	Away colours

The 1948 was the 8th season in Independiente Santa Fe's existence, and the club's 1st year in the Campeonato Profesional.

== Players ==
=== First-team squad ===
Note: Flags indicate national team as defined under FIFA eligibility rules; some limited exceptions apply. Players may hold more than one non-FIFA nationality.

No.	Pos.	Nation	Player
—	GK	COL	Julio Gaviria
—	GK	COL	Julio Zamudio
—	DF	ARG	Oscar Bernau
—	DF	COL	Luis Contreras
—	DF	COL	Alberto Guardiola
—	DF	COL	Antonio de la Hoz
—	DF	COL	Héctor Martínez
—	DF	JPN	Kaor Dokú^{1}
—	MF	ARG	Lorenzo Delli
—	MF	COL	Luis Fiscó
—	MF	COL	Hernando Moyano

No.	Pos.	Nation	Player
—	MF	COL	Luis Rubio
—	MF	COL	Iván Salazar
—	MF	COL	Luis Vásquez
—	FW	ARG	Germán Anton
—	FW	COL	Rafael Prieto
—	FW	COL	Roberto Gámez
—	FW	COL	Gabriel Pineda
—	FW	COL	Miguel Talero
—	FW	ESP	Jesús María Lires
—	FW	ESP	Héctor Rial^{2}

Manager: (Peru) Carlos Carrillo

1 Kaor Dokú was able to register as Colombian by the nationality of his mother
2 Héctor Rial was registered as Argentinian by his place of birth, also he didn't have Spanish nationality at the time
Source: Golgolgol

=== Players statistics ===
No.	Pos.	Nat.	Player	LA	LG	CA	CG	IA	IG	TA	TG	PM	Yellow card	Red card	Updated
	GK	(Colombia)	Julio Gaviria	18	0	0	0	0	0	18	0	1,600	0	0	6 September 2013
	GK	(Colombia)	Julio Zamudio	1	0	0	0	0	0	1	0	20	0	0	6 September 2013
	DF	(Argentina)	Oscar Bernau	17	0	0	0	0	0	17	0	1,503	1	0	6 September 2013
	DF	(Colombia)	Luis Contreras	8	0	0	0	0	0	8	0	600	0	0	6 September 2013
	DF	(Colombia)	Alberto Guardiola	15	0	0	0	0	0	15	0	1,230	0	1	6 September 2013
	DF	(Colombia)	Antonio de la Hoz	18	0	0	0	0	0	18	0	1,571	0	0	6 September 2013
	DF	(Colombia)	Héctor Martínez	2	0	0	0	0	0	2	0	47	0	0	6 September 2013
	DF	(Japan)	Kaor Dokú	10	0	0	0	0	0	10	0	830	0	0	6 September 2013
	MF	(Argentina)	Lorenzo Delli	18	0	0	0	0	0	18	0	1,466	0	0	6 September 2013
	MF	(Colombia)	Luis Fiscó	8	0	0	0	0	0	8	0	700	0	0	6 September 2013
	MF	(Colombia)	Hernando Moyano	1	0	0	0	0	0	1	0	42	0	0	6 September 2013
	MF	(Colombia)	Luis Rubio	5	1	0	0	0	0	5	1	288	0	0	6 September 2013
	MF	(Colombia)	Iván Salazar	1	0	0	0	0	0	1	0	13	0	0	6 September 2013
	MF	(Colombia)	Luis Vásquez	1	0	0	0	0	0	1	0	10	0	0	6 September 2013
	FW	(Argentina)	Germán Anton	18	18	0	0	0	0	18	18	1,620	0	1	6 September 2013
	FW	(Colombia)	Rafael Prieto	18	7	0	0	0	0	18	7	1,493	0	0	6 September 2013
	FW	(Colombia)	Roberto Gámez	18	5	0	0	0	0	18	5	1,608	1	0	6 September 2013
	FW	(Colombia)	Gabriel Pineda	18	3	0	0	0	0	18	3	1,414	0	0	6 September 2013
	FW	(Colombia)	Miguel Talero	2	0	0	0	0	0	2	0	145	0	0	6 September 2013
	FW	(Spain)	Jesús María Lires	18	20	0	0	0	0	18	20	1,620	0	1	6 September 2013
	FW	(Spain)	Héctor Rial	0	0	0	0	0	0	0	0	0	0	0	6 September 2013

International cup: Did not play in international tournaments
Source: Golgolgol

=== Goalscorers ===
R	Pos	Player	App	G	Pen	Avg	Updated
1st	FW	(Spain) Jesús María Lires	18	20	0	1.11	6 September 2013
2nd	FW	(Argentina) Germán Anton	18	18	0	1	6 September 2013
3rd	FW	(Colombia) Rafael Prieto	18	7	0	0.39	6 September 2013
4th	FW	(Colombia) Roberto Gámez	18	5	0	0.28	6 September 2013
5th	FW	(Colombia) Gabriel Pineda	18	3	0	0.17	6 September 2013
6th	MF	(Colombia) Luis Rubio	5	1	0	0.2	6 September 2013

Source: Golgol

=== Disciplinary record ===
N	Pos.	Nat.	Name	Yellow card	Second yellow card	Red card	Notes
	DF	(Colombia)	Alberto Guardiola	0	0	1	
	FW	(Spain)	Jesús María Lires	0	0	1	
	FW	(Colombia)	Germán Anton	0	0	1	
	FW	(Colombia)	Roberto Gámez	1	0	0	
	DF	(Argentina)	Oscar Bernau	1	0	0	

Last updated: 7 September 2013
Source: Golgolgol
Only competitive matches
(yellow card) = Number of bookings; (second yellow card) = Number of sending offs after a second yellow card; (red card) = Number of sending offs by a direct red card.

== Competitions ==
=== Campeonato Profesional ===
Pos	Team	Pld	W	D	L	GF	GA	GD	Pts
1	Santa Fe (C)	18	12	3	3	57	29	+28	27
2	Junior	18	11	1	6	48	35	+13	23
3	Deportes Caldas	18	8	4	6	45	40	+5	20
4	Millonarios	18	9	1	8	58	45	+13	19
5	América	18	8	2	8	40	31	+9	18

Source: RSSSF
(C) Champions

=== Home-away summary ===
==== Home ====
Pos	Team	Pld	W	D	L	GF	GA	GD	Pts
1	Santa Fe (C)	9	7	2	0	38	16	+22	16

(C) Champions

==== Away ====
Pos	Team	Pld	W	D	L	GF	GA	GD	Pts
1	Santa Fe (C)	9	5	1	3	19	13	+6	11

(C) Champions

=== Match results ===
Match won	Match drawn	Match lost

15 August 1948 1	Deportes Caldas	1 – 1	Santa Fe	Manizales
	Cardona 56'	Report	Sarría 24' (o.g.)	Stadium: Estadio Palogrande; Referee: Benjamín Caicedo

22 August 1948 2	Santa Fe	5 – 2	Municipal	Bogotá
	Gámez 30', 53'; Lires 62'; Anton 71'; Osorio 82' (o.g.)	Report	Guerra 57'; Ríos 81'	Stadium: Estadio Alfonso López Pumarejo; Referee: Rudi Kamiski

29 August 1948 3	Junior	2 – 4	Santa Fe	Barranquilla
	R. García 76', 84'	Report	Anton 15', 35', 67'; Lires 45'	Stadium: Estadio Romelio Martínez; Referee: Gabriel Díaz

5 September 1948 4	Santa Fe	5 – 1	América	Bogotá
	Gámez 36', 57'; Lires 49', 80'; Anton 65'	Report	Flórez 3'	Stadium: Estadio Alfonso López Pumarejo; Referee: Guillermo Acuña

12 September 1948 5	Once Deportivo	2 – 5	Santa Fe	Manizales
	Ospina 1'; Alume 70'	Report	Anton 35', 40', 51', 82'; Pineda 58'	Stadium: Estadio Palogrande; Referee: Fabio López

19 September 1948 6	Santa Fe	5 – 3	Millonarios	Bogotá
	Anton 11'; Prieto 39'; Lires 63', 70', 76'	Report	A. Rodríguez 17'; Vargas 50'; Castillo 57'	Stadium: Estadio Alfonso López Pumarejo; Referee: Gabriel Granados

26 September 1948 7	Santa Fe	6 – 3	Universidad	Bogotá
	Lires 7', 45', 75', 78'; Anton 33', 81'	Report	G. Hernández 55', 63'; R. López 82'	Stadium: Estadio Alfonso López Pumarejo; Referee: Daniel Mallarino

17 October 1948 8	Medellín	2 – 0	Santa Fe	Medellín
	Marín 23', 57'	Report		Stadium: Estadio San Fernando; Referee: Orlando Esquivel

10 October 1948 9	Santa Fe	3 – 3	Deportivo Cali	Bogotá
	Prieto 10'; Mejía 25' (o.g.); Anton 48'	Report	Reuben 60' (pen.), 73'; Ruíz 66'	Stadium: Estadio Alfonso López Pumarejo; Referee: Guillermo Acuña

24 October 1948 10	Santa Fe	2 – 2	Deportes Caldas	Bogotá
	Pineda 67'; Prieto 82'	Report	Martino 11'; Arango 42'	Stadium: Estadio Alfonso López Pumarejo; Referee: Antonio Díaz

31 October 1948 11	Municipal	2 – 1	Santa Fe	Medellín
	Echavarría 19'; Guerra 76'	Report	Lires 45'	Stadium: Estadio San Fernando; Referee: Guillermo Acuña

7 November 1948 12	Santa Fe	4 – 1	Junior	Bogotá
	Anton 10'; Gámez 22'; Rubio 45'; Lires 81'	Report	Mendoza 71'	Stadium: Estadio Alfonso López Pumarejo; Referee: Roberto Kowell

14 November 1948 13	América	1 – 2	Santa Fe	Cali
	G. Gutiérrez 18'	Report	Antón 41'; Lires 79'	Stadium: Estadio Olímpico Pascual Guerrero; Referee: Elías Coll

21 November 1948 14	Santa Fe	2 – 1	Once Deportivo	Bogotá
	Lires 13'; Pineda 19'; Bernau (yellow card) 60'; Gámez (yellow card) 81'	Report	Barona 47'; Restrepo (red card) 90'	Stadium: Estadio Alfonso López Pumarejo; Referee: Luis Rendón

29 November 1948 15	Millonarios	1 – 2	Santa Fe	Bogotá
	Castillo 68'; G. García (red card) 80'	Report	Anton 10'; Prieto 60'; Guardiola (red card) 80'	Stadium: Estadio El Campín; Referee: Roberto Kowell

4 December 1948 16	Universidad	1 – 4	Santa Fe	Pereira
	Yahmure 80'	Report	Lires 16', 38', 67'; Anton 47'	Stadium: Estadio Libaré; Referee: Roberto Kowell

12 December 1948 17	Santa Fe	6 – 0	Medellín	Bogotá
	Prieto 65', 70', 73'; Anton 80'; Lires 85', 90'	Report		Stadium: Estadio Alfonso López Pumarejo; Referee: Alfonso Pedraza

19 December 1948 18	Deportivo Cali	1 – 0	Santa Fe	Cali
	Guzmán 32'; R. Ruíz (red card) 56'	Report	Anton (red card) 71'; Lires (red card) 80'	Stadium: Estadio Olímpico Pascual Guerrero; Referee: Roberto Castro
