= Ballet Azul =

The Ballet Azul (Blue Ballet) is a term coined in Colombia in the 1950s to describe the Millonarios football team, during its successful period from 1949 to 1964. The nickname has its origins in Millonarios's blue kit and style of play. Later in the 1960s, in Chile, Ecuador and Costa Rica, the same term was used to refer to Universidad de Chile (during its successful period from 1959 to 1969), Emelec, and C.S. Cartaginés respectively.

== Millonarios, the first Ballet Azul ==
The term Ballet Azul (Blue Ballet) was coined by radio commentator Carlos Arturo Rueda (referring to Millonarios' blue uniforms) during the golden age of Colombian football known as El Dorado (1949–1953), a period when the national league broke away from FIFA after the DIMAYOR, the governing body of the national league, leave the Colombian Football Federation, which allowed its teams to bypass international transfer rules and offer more lucrative and flexible contracts. This attracted many of South America's top players drawn by the significantly higher salaries offered by clubs, especially following the 1948 players' strike in Argentina, which exposed poor working conditions and financial instability in the local league.

In 1952, Millonarios gained international fame after defeating Real Madrid 4–2 at the Santiago Bernabéu stadium (then Chamartín) during the Bodas de Oro tournament. The following year, Millonarios also triumphed in the Small Club World Cup in Caracas, Venezuela. With this team, Millonarios won the Colombian League championship in 1949, 1951, 1952, 1953, 1959, 1961, 1962, 1963 and 1964.

Some of the notable footballers of the time that were part of the Ballet Azul squad are:

Player	Nationality	Position	Years at Club
Alfredo Di Stéfano	(Argentina) Argentine	Forward	1949–1953
Adolfo Pedernera	(Argentina) Argentine	Attacking midfielder	1949–1954
Néstor Rossi	(Argentina) Argentine	Defensive midfielder	1949–1954
Julio Cozzi	(Argentina) Argentine	Goalkeeper	1950–1954
Raúl Pini	(Uruguay) Uruguayan	Defender	1950–1953
Francisco Zuluaga	(Colombia) Colombian	Defender	1949–1955
Julio César Ramírez	(Paraguay) Paraguayan	Defender	1950–1953
Carlos Aldabe	(Argentina) Argentine	Manager	1949–1950
Gabriel Ochoa Uribe	(Colombia) Colombian	Goalkeeper	1949–1952
Ramón Villaverde	(Uruguay) Uruguayan	Forward	1953–1954

== Universidad de Chile, the Chilean Ballet Azul ==
The team won the Chilean league championship in 1959, 1962, 1964, 1965, 1967 and 1969, Tournament Metropolitan in 1968, 1969 and the Cup Francisco Candelori in 1969.

In addition, many of the players were part of the Chile national team that managed to win a bronze medal at the 1962 FIFA World Cup. Following the success, the club was invited to a European tour where they beat teams like Internazionale F.C., champion of Italy and Europe.

Among the most outstanding team members of the Chilean Ballet Azul were:

- (Chile) Leonel Sánchez
- (Chile) Rubén Marcos
- (Chile) Luis Eyzaguirre
- (Chile) Sergio Navarro
- (Chile) Jaime Ramírez
- (Argentina) Ernesto Alvarez
- (Chile) Carlos Campos
- (Chile) Braulio Musso
- (Chile) Carlos Contreras
- (Chile) Manuel Astorga
- (Chile) Alberto Quintano
- (Chile) Luis Álamos (Manager 1956–1966)
- (Chile) Ulises Ramos (Manager 1969)
