= 1952 Campeonato Profesional =

Campeonato Profesional
- Season: 1952
- Champions: Millonarios (3rd title)
- Matches: 210
- Goals: 768 (3.66 per match)
- Top goalscorer: Alfredo Di Stéfano (19)
- Biggest home win: Boca Juniors 7–1 Sporting
- Biggest away win: Deportivo Samarios 1–11 Deportes Quindío
- Highest scoring: Deportivo Samarios 1–11 Deportes Quindío

The 1952 Campeonato Profesional was the fifth season of Colombia's top-flight football league. 15 teams compete against one another and played each weekend. The tournament was notable for being the fourth year of El Dorado. Millonarios won the league for 3rd time in its history after getting 46 points.

== Background ==
The tournament was the fourth year of El Dorado. The number of teams was reduced from 18 to 15: Deportes Caldas and Once Deportivo joined to form Deportivo Manizales. Huracán de Medellín disappeared due to poor performance, while Independiente Medellín had to retire because of an economic crisis.

Universidad, who was also in an economic crisis, received a lot of players from other teams in order to enable their participation in the championship: Santa Fe loaned it Roberto Martínez, Atilio Miotti, Juan Candall, José María Arnaldo, Oscar Contreras, Luis López, Mario Fernández y Angel Perucca; Millonarios loaned Tomás Aves; Junior loaned Heraldo Ferreyro; Deportivo Manizales loaned Segundo Tessori, Vicente Gallina and Osvaldo Bianco; and Deportivo Samarios loaned Milos Dragoilovich.

Millonarios became the first team to win the championship three times, and the first team to win two consecutive titles. Alfredo Di Stéfano became goalscorer of the tournament for the second time in succession. This was the most successful year of the denominated Ballet Azul, in which also played 33 international matches, finishing with 20 wins, 10 draws and 3 losses, being the 4-2 win against Real Madrid its most memorable match.

== League system ==
Every team played two games against each other team, one at home and one away. Teams received two points for a win and one point for a draw. If two or more teams were tied on points, places were determined by goal difference. The team with the most points is the champion of the league.

== Teams ==
Locations of the 1952 Campeonato Profesional teams:
- 1. Armenia
- 2. Barranquilla
- 3. Bogotá
- 4. Bucaramanga
- 5. Cali
- 6. Cúcuta
- 7. Manizales
- 8. Medellín
- 9. Pereira
- 10. Santa Marta

Team	City	Stadium
América	Cali	Estadio Olímpico Pascual Guerrero
Atlético Bucaramanga	Bucaramanga	Estadio Alfonso López
Atlético Municipal	Medellín^{a}	Estadio San Fernando
Boca Juniors	Cali	Estadio Olímpico Pascual Guerrero
Cúcuta Deportivo	Cúcuta	Estadio General Santander
Deportes Quindío	Armenia	Estadio San José de Armenia
Deportivo Manizales	Manizales	Estadio Palogrande
Deportivo Cali	Cali	Estadio Olímpico Pascual Guerrero
Deportivo Pereira	Pereira	Estadio Libaré
Deportivo Samarios	Santa Marta	Estadio Eduardo Santos
Junior	Barranquilla	Estadio Romelio Martínez
Millonarios	Bogotá	Estadio El Campín
Santa Fe	Bogotá	Estadio El Campín
Sporting de Barranquilla	Barranquilla	Estadio Romelio Martínez
Universidad	Bogotá	Estadio Alfonso López Pumarejo

^{a} Municipal played its home games at Itagüí

== Final standings ==
Pos	Team	Pld	W	D	L	GF	GA	GD	Pts
1	Millonarios (C)	28	20	6	2	70	14	+56	46
2	Boca Juniors	28	18	4	6	67	36	+31	40
3	Deportivo Pereira	28	16	5	7	50	44	+6	37
4	Deportivo Cali	28	15	5	8	69	41	+28	35
5	Quindío	28	14	7	7	67	43	+24	35
6	Junior	28	14	5	9	57	43	+14	33
7	América	28	12	7	9	50	38	+12	31
8	Cúcuta Deportivo	28	14	4	10	54	36	+18	32
9	Santa Fe	28	9	7	12	54	65	−11	25
10	Universidad	28	9	6	13	53	54	−1	24
11	Deportivo Samarios	28	7	5	16	38	78	−40	19
12	Deportivo Manizales	28	7	4	17	38	60	−22	18
13	Atlético Nacional	28	5	7	16	38	69	−31	17
14	Sporting	28	7	2	19	33	66	−33	16
15	Atlético Bucaramanga	28	3	6	19	35	86	−51	12

Source: RSSSF
(C) Champions

=== Results ===
Home \ Away	AME	BJ	BUC	CAL	CUC	JUN	MAN	MIL	NAC	PER	QUI	SAM	SFE	SPB	UNI
América		2–3	2–0	1–1	2–0	0–0	2–1	1–1	4–1	3–2	0–2	5–1	3–1	4–1	2–0
Boca Juniors	4–2		2–0	1–3	4–0	4–2	4–2	0–2	3–0	0–1	2–0	3–0	2–2	7–1	2–0
Atlético Bucaramanga	0–1	1–1		1–3	1–1	1–2	2–2	1–7	2–2	0–2	2–6	2–2	1–3	2–1	2–1
Deportivo Cali	2–2	1–2	5–0		3–2	5–3	3–0	1–1	6–2	2–2	3–1	4–1	2–2	3–0	1–0
Cúcuta Deportivo	3–0	1–2	5–1	3–1		3–1	2–0	0–2	0–1	1–2	4–1	2–0	2–1	4–0	3–2
Junior	3–1	0–2	4–2	2–0	2–0		4–0	1–2	3–1	5–0	4–1	3–2	3–1	2–1	1–1
Deportivo Manizales	1–1	4–1	4–0	3–2	0–4	1–1		0–3	1–2	1–1	1–3	4–1	0–1	1–0	1–2
Millonarios	1–0	3–0	4–0	2–1	4–0	4–0	5–1		2–2	5–0	0–0	4–0	1–1	3–1	3–0
Atlético Nacional	2–4	0–3	4–2	1–3	2–1	1–4	2–0	0–2		1–1	0–1	2–2	2–2	2–3	1–2
Deportivo Pereira	0–0	2–1	3–2	2–5	1–3	1–0	2–1	1–0	2–2		2–1	3–1	2–0	4–0	3–2
Quindío	3–2	2–2	6–1	2–0	1–1	1–1	3–1	0–1	6–1	0–5		0–0	2–1	3–0	4–3
Deportivo Samarios	0–2	2–6	1–0 (Note: Atlético Bucaramanga did not play due to ticketing issues.)	2–1	1–4	2–1	3–1	1–1	2–1	0–1	1–11		4–2	3–2	0–3
Santa Fe	0–2	1–1	4–3	0–4	1–1	4–2	3–1	0–6	5–2	4–2	0–2	3–3		2–1	3–5
Sporting	1–1	0–1	4–0	0–3	0–4	1–2	2–4	1–0	3–1	0–1	1–1	3–1	3–2		3–1
Universidad	1–0	2–4	3–3	3–1	0–0	1–1	1–2	0–1	0–0	4–2	4–4	4–2	3–5	4–0	

Legend: Blue = home team win; Yellow = draw; Red = away team win.

=== Top goalscorers ===
Rank	Name	Club	Goals
1	(Argentina) (Colombia) Alfredo Di Stéfano	Millonarios	19
2	(Argentina) Carlos Gambina	Junior	18
3	(Argentina) Raúl Dimarco	Millonarios	17
3	(Argentina) Mario Garelli	Deportes Quindío	17
5	(Argentina) Germán Antón	Santa Fe	16
5	(Colombia) Jaime Gutiérrez	Deportes Quindío	16
5	(Paraguay) Francisco Solano Patiño	Boca Juniors	16
5	(Uruguay) Ramón Villaverde	Cúcuta Deportivo	16
9	(Argentina) Rubí Cerioni	Deportivo Cali	15
9	(Colombia) Miguel Mora	Sporting	15

Source: RSSSF.com Colombia 1952
