= List of Deportes Tolima managers =

This is a list of all former and current managers of the Colombian football team Deportes Tolima.

== Managers ==
Year	Name
1955–1959	(Argentina) Juan Barbieri
1959–1960	(Paraguay) Alejandrino Genes
1960	(Argentina) Abel Duplá
1963	(Hungary) Jorge Foldes
1963	(Argentina) Luis López
1963–1964	(Argentina) Lorenzo Delli
1965	(Colombia) Roberto Pacheco
1968–1975	(Colombia) Óscar Ramos
1976	(Argentina) Omar Devani
1976	(Colombia) Delio Gamboa
1977	(Argentina) Jorge Ginarte
1978	(Argentina) Alberto Cardacci
1979	(Colombia) Edgar Barona
1979	(Paraguay) César López Fretes
1980	(Uruguay) José María Rodríguez
1980	(Colombia) Leonel Montoya
1981	(Paraguay) Ramón Rodríguez
1981	(Uruguay) José Ricardo De León
1981	(Colombia) Pedro Ospina
1982	(Uruguay) Juan Mujica
1983	(Argentina) Raúl Navarro
1983	(Uruguay) Francisco Salomone
1984	(Uruguay) Baudilio Jáuregui
1985	(Colombia) Hermán Aceros

Year	Name
1985	(Uruguay) Baudilio Jáuregui
1986	(Brazil) Santo Cristo
1986	(Colombia) Jorge Bernal
1986	(Socialist Federal Republic of Yugoslavia) Simo Vilić
1987	(Colombia) Jorge Bernal
1987	(Colombia) Eladio Vásquez
1988	(Colombia) Jaime Rodríguez
1989	(Colombia) Roberto Vasco
1990–1991	(Colombia) Jorge Bernal
1991	(Paraguay) Aurelio Silva
1991	(Colombia) Germán González
1992	(Uruguay) Baudilio Jáuregui
1992–1993	(Colombia) Jaime Rodríguez
1993	(Colombia) Arturo Boyacá
1994	(Colombia) Humberto Ortíz
1995	(Colombia) Juan Francisco Arteaga
1996	(Uruguay) Julio Comesaña
1996	(Colombia) Humberto Ortíz
1996	(Peru) Gerardo González
1996–1997	(Uruguay) Juan Mujica
1998	(Colombia) Carlos Restrepo
1999	(Colombia) Humberto Ortíz

Year	Name
1999	(Colombia) Luis Augusto García
1999–2001	(Colombia) Néstor Otero
2001–2002	(Colombia) Miguel Prince
2002	(Colombia) Jorge Bernal
2002	(Colombia) Luis Fernando Suárez
2003	(Colombia) Luis Augusto García
2004–2005	(Colombia) Miguel Prince
2006	(Colombia) Jorge Bernal
January 2007 – June 2007	(Colombia) Jaime De La Pava
July 2007 – December 2011	(Colombia) Hernán Torres
December 2011 – August 2012	(Colombia) Jorge Bernal
August 2012 – May 2016	(Colombia) Carlos Castro
May 2016 – December 2016	(Colombia) Alberto Gamero
January 2017 – February 2017	(Uruguay) Gregorio Pérez
February 2017 – June 2017	(Argentina) Óscar Quintabani
July 2017 – August 2017	(Colombia) José Eugenio Hernández
August 2017 – November 2019	(Colombia) Alberto Gamero
December 2019 – April 2023	(Colombia) Hernán Torres
April 2023 – September 2023	(Argentina) Juan Cruz Real
September 2023	(Spain) José Arastey
September 2023 – December 2024	(Colombia) David González
January 2025 – present	(Spain) Ismael Rescalvo

Source: Worldfootball.net
