= El Dorado (Colombian football) =

Time period in Colombian football

El Dorado is the name given to an era (1949–54) of the Colombian football league during which the league broke away from FIFA. The Colombia national team and all domestic clubs were banned from international competition during this period, although some authors consider that to have been a "golden age" for Colombian football.

== History ==
The Colombia football league turned professional in 1948 and awarded its first championship that year to Independiente Santa Fe. Internal disputes later that year caused DIMAYOR to leave the Colombian Football Federation. In response, FIFA suspended the league and the national team from all the international tournaments.

Meanwhile, the Argentine Football Association was dealing with a strike by its players. Several of the most important Argentinian players were looking to leave the country and, as the Colombian league was not affiliated to FIFA, Colombian clubs that wished to sign them were not required to pay transfer fees. Alfonso Senior, the chairman of Millonarios FC, decided to take advantage of the situation by signing several Argentine stars.

The first of the Millonarios signings was River Plate star Adolfo Pedernera. The signing was announced on June 8, 1949, and by the time Pedernera arrived at Bogota's Techo International Airport there were 5,000 fans there to greet him. The club made five times more money on the day of the player's presentation than they earned on a regular league. Other Colombian clubs began scrambling to follow suit by signing stars from all over South America and Europe:

- Atlético Junior brought the Brazilians Tim and Heleno de Freitas; and the Hungarians László Szőke, Imre Danko, Béla Sárosi, Ferenc Nyers and Mihail Uram.
- Boca Juniors de Cali brought the Paraguayan Atilio López.
- Cúcuta Deportivo brought a lot of players from Uruguay: Julio Terra, Alcides Mañay, Juan José Tulic, Dardo Acuña, Lauro Rodríguez, Washington Barrios, Luis Alberto Miloc, Carlos Zunino, Abraham González, Ramón Villaverde, Julio Ulises Terra, Juan Deluca, Juan Carlos Toja, Schubert Gambetta, Eusebio Tejera, Antonio Sacco and Bibiano Zapirain, some of the Uruguayan players of the team that won the 1950 World Cup.
- Deportes Caldas brought the Lithuanian goalkeeper Vytautas Krisciunas.
- Deportivo Cali brought players from Peru, as Valeriano López, and Argentina.
- Deportivo Pereira brought players from Paraguay: Carmelo Colombo, Enrique Avalos, Marcelino Vargas and César López Fretes; and a player from Italy: Luigi Di Franco.
- Deportivo Samarios was founded by the squad of the Hungaria FbC Roma when it was disbanded. The first team consisted of 10 Colombians, 8 Hungarians, 2 Yugoslavs, 1 Austrian, 1 Argentine, 1 Italian and 1 Romanian including 1938 World Cup's Silver Boot Gyula Zsengellér.
- Independiente Medellín brought players from Peru: Roberto Drago and Segundo Castillo Varela.
- Independiente Santa Fe brought the Argentines Héctor Rial, who would later be star of Real Madrid, and René Pontoni, as well as the Englishmen Neil Franklin and George Mountford from Stoke City, and Charlie Mitten from Manchester United.
- Millonarios, called the Ballet Azul due its greatest performances, went back to Argentina and brought Alfredo Di Stéfano, Julio Cozzi and Néstor Rossi; and the Britons Billy Higgins of Everton FC and Bobby Flavell of Hearts.

In 1950, DIMAYOR agreed with FIFA to end El Dorado through the Pacto de Lima. The key requirement was that the foreign players would return to their countries in 1954.

== See also ==
- 1949 Campeonato Profesional
- 1950 Campeonato Profesional
- 1951 Campeonato Profesional
- 1952 Campeonato Profesional
- 1953 Campeonato Profesional
- 1954 Campeonato Profesional
