= Carlos Carrillo =

Carlos Carrillo may refer to:

- Carlos Antonio Carrillo (1783–1852), Governor of Alta California, 1837–1838
- Carlos Carrillo Nalda (1909–1994), Peruvian footballer and manager
- Carlos Carrillo (footballer) (born 1984), Salvadoran footballer
- Carlos Carrillo Parodi, microbiologist
- Carlos A. Carrillo, Veracruz, municipality in Veracruz, Mexico
