= 1956 Campeonato Profesional =

Campeonato Profesional
- Season: 1956
- Champions: Atlético Quindío (1st title)
- Matches: 156
- Goals: 626 (4.01 per match)
- Top goalscorer: Jaime Gutiérrez (21)
- Biggest home win: Atlético Quindío 7–1 Deportivo Pereira
- Biggest away win: Libertad 0–8 Cúcuta Deportivo
- Highest scoring: Atlético Nacional 7–5 Libertad

The 1956 Campeonato Profesional was the ninth season of Colombia's top-flight football league. 13 teams compete against one another and played each weekend. Atlético Quindío won the league for 1st time in its history after getting 37 points. Independiente Medellín, the defending champion, was 5th with 30 points.

== Background ==
13 teams competed in the tournament: Deportivo Pereira, Atlético Bucaramanga and Unión Magdalena returned, Deportivo Cali was not admitted, and Libertad de Barranquilla was created. Atlético Quindío won the championship for first time, with its goalscorer Jaime Gutiérrez becoming the first Colombian topscorer in the league (before him, only foreign players achieved this).

== League system ==
Every team played two games against each other team, one at home and one away. Teams received two points for a win and one point for a draw. If two or more teams were tied on points, places were determined by goal difference. The team with the most points is the champion of the league.

== Teams ==
Locations of the 1956 Campeonato Profesional teams:
- 1. Armenia
- 2. Barranquilla
- 3. Bogotá
- 4. Bucaramanga
- 5. Cali
- 6. Cúcuta
- 7. Ibagué
- 8. Medellín
- 9. Pereira
- 10. Santa Marta

Team	City	Stadium
América	Cali	Estadio Olímpico Pascual Guerrero
Atlético Bucaramanga	Bucaramanga	Estadio Alfonso López
Atlético Nacional	Medellín	Estadio Atanasio Girardot
Atlético Quindío	Armenia	Estadio San José de Armenia
Boca Juniors	Cali	Estadio Olímpico Pascual Guerrero
Cúcuta Deportivo	Cúcuta	Estadio General Santander
Deportes Tolima	Ibagué	Estadio Gustavo Rojas Pinilla
Deportivo Pereira	Pereira	Estadio Alberto Mora Mora
Independiente Medellín	Medellín	Estadio Atanasio Girardot
Libertad de Barranquilla	Barranquilla	Estadio Romelio Martínez
Millonarios	Bogotá	Estadio El Campín
Santa Fe	Bogotá	Estadio El Campín
Unión Magdalena	Santa Marta	Estadio Eduardo Santos

== Final standings ==
Pos	Team	Pld	W	D	L	GF	GA	GD	Pts
1	Atlético Quindío (C)	24	17	3	4	67	34	+33	37
2	Millonarios	24	16	2	6	48	35	+13	34
3	Boca Juniors	24	14	5	5	55	44	+11	33
4	Cúcuta Deportivo	24	13	6	5	64	38	+26	32
5	Independiente Medellín	24	12	6	6	62	35	+27	30
6	Deportes Tolima	24	12	6	6	48	34	+14	30
7	América de Cali	24	11	2	11	44	46	−2	24
8	Libertad	24	9	3	12	44	59	−15	21
9	Atlético Nacional	24	8	4	12	53	57	−4	20
10	Atlético Bucaramanga	24	5	5	14	34	56	−22	15
11	Deportivo Pereira	24	6	3	15	38	56	−18	15
12	Santa Fe	24	6	1	17	35	56	−21	13
13	Unión Magdalena	24	3	2	19	34	76	−42	8

Source: RSSSF
(C) Champions

=== Results ===
Home \ Away	AME	BJ	BUC	CUC	LIB	MAG	MED	MIL	NAC	PER	QUI	SFE	TOL
América		0–2	1–0	3–2	1–3	2–2	1–3	1–2	3–2	1–3	3–1	2–0	3–3
Boca Juniors	2–0		5–3	1–6	2–1	5–3	1–1	1–2	5–2	2–1	1–3	2–1	3–1
Atlético Bucaramanga	1–6	1–2		1–1	2–1	2–1	2–1	1–2	0–2	3–1	1–3	1–1	2–3
Cúcuta Deportivo	3–2	0–1	1–1		3–4	4–2	3–3	4–2	2–1	4–1	0–3	6–1	2–3
Libertad	2–1	4–4	1–1	0–8		2–0	1–3	2–3	4–2	3–1	1–2	2–3	1–0
Unión Magdalena	1–2	0–4	0–2	1–2	2–2		1–5	1–3	1–3	3–1	4–3	2–5	2–3
Independiente Medellín	1–2	1–2	5–1	1–2	2–3	6–0		3–3	4–2	6–1	2–0	3–0	3–2
Millonarios	2–1	3–2	3–2	2–3	0–1	3–1	1–1		1–2	1–2	2–3	3–1	2–0
Atlético Nacional	2–3	5–1	2–2	2–3	7–5	1–2	2–2	1–2		3–1	2–5	3–2	2–2
Deportivo Pereira	2–3	2–2	4–2	1–1	4–0	5–0	1–2	1–2	1–1		0–1	2–1	1–3
Atlético Quindío	5–1	0–0	4–2	1–1	4–0	4–3	2–1	1–2	3–2	7–1		3–0	2–0
Santa Fe	0–1	2–3	3–1	0–2	2–0	3–1	2–3	0–1	0–1	3–0	4–6		1–6
Deportes Tolima	2–1	2–2	3–0	1–1	2–1	4–1	0–0	0–1	3–1	2–1	1–1	2–0	

Legend: Blue = home team win; Yellow = draw; Red = away team win.

=== Top goalscorers ===
Rank	Name	Club	Goals
1	(Colombia) Jaime Gutiérrez	Atlético Quindío	21
2	(Argentina) José Grecco	Independiente Medellín	20
3	(Paraguay) Casimiro Ávalos	Deportivo Pereira	17
3	(Argentina) Felipe Marino	Atlético Nacional	17
5	(Argentina) Alfredo Castillo	Millonarios	16
6	(Colombia) Carlos Arango	Cúcuta Deportivo	15
6	(Uruguay) Bibiano Zapirain	Cúcuta Deportivo	15
8	(Paraguay) Francisco Solano Patiño	Atlético Quindío	14
8	(Peru) Alfredo Mosquera	Deportes Tolima	14
10	(Paraguay) Alejandrino Genes	Atlético Quindío	13

Source: RSSSF.com Colombia 1956
