= 1953 Campeonato Profesional =

Campeonato Profesional
- Season: 1953
- Champions: Millonarios (4th title)
- Matches: 132
- Goals: 535 (4.05 per match)
- Top goalscorer: Mario Garelli (20)
- Biggest home win: Santa Fe 7–0 Unión Magdalena
- Biggest away win: Junior 0–4 Atlético Nacional; Atlético Nacional 1–5 Deportivo Cali; Deportivo Pereira 1–5 Boca Juniors; Sporting 0–4 Santa Fe
- Highest scoring: Deportivo Pereira 4–7 Atlético Nacional; Atlético Quindío 8–3 Sporting

The 1953 Campeonato Profesional was the sixth season of Colombia's top-flight football league. Twelve teams compete against one another and played each weekend. The tournament was notable for being the fifth and last year of El Dorado. Millonarios won the league for the fourth time in its history and for the third time in a row after getting 35 points.

== Background ==
The tournament was the fifth year of El Dorado, after the DIMAYOR agreed the Pacto de Lima with the FIFA, with the requirement that the foreign players would return to their countries the next year.

Twelve teams competed in the tournament, three fewer than the previous year: Deportivo Manizales and Universidad were dissolved, while América de Cali and Independiente Medellín were bankrupt and did not join. Deportivo Samarios was refounded as Unión Magdalena. Millonarios won the championship for the third consecutive time, getting their fourth league title.

== League system ==
Every team played two games against each other team, one at home and one away. Teams received two points for a win and one point for a draw. If two or more teams were tied on points, places were determined by goal difference. The team with the most points is the champion of the league.

== Teams ==
Locations of the 1953 Campeonato Profesional teams:
- 1. Armenia
- 2. Barranquilla
- 3. Bogotá
- 4. Bucaramanga
- 5. Cali
- 6. Cúcuta
- 7. Medellín
- 8. Pereira
- 9. Santa Marta

Team	City	Stadium
Atlético Bucaramanga	Bucaramanga	Estadio Alfonso López
Atlético Nacional	Medellín	Estadio Atanasio Girardot
Atlético Quindío	Armenia	Estadio San José de Armenia
Boca Juniors	Cali	Estadio Olímpico Pascual Guerrero
Cúcuta Deportivo	Cúcuta	Estadio General Santander
Deportivo Cali	Cali	Estadio Olímpico Pascual Guerrero
Deportivo Pereira	Pereira	Estadio Alberto Mora Mora
Junior	Barranquilla	Estadio Romelio Martínez
Millonarios	Bogotá	Estadio El Campín
Santa Fe	Bogotá	Estadio El Campín
Sporting de Barranquilla	Barranquilla	Estadio Romelio Martínez
Unión Magdalena	Santa Marta	Estadio Eduardo Santos

== Final standings ==
Pos	Team	Pld	W	D	L	GF	GA	GD	Pts
1	Millonarios (C)	22	14	7	1	51	22	+29	35
2	Quindío	22	14	5	3	66	40	+26	33
3	Boca Juniors	22	13	5	4	44	30	+14	31
4	Santa Fe	22	12	5	5	57	30	+27	29
5	Cúcuta Deportivo	22	11	4	7	58	42	+16	26
6	Deportivo Cali	22	9	8	5	38	30	+8	26
7	Atlético Nacional	22	10	5	7	57	45	+12	25
8	Unión Magdalena	22	6	3	13	35	58	−23	15
9	Sporting	22	6	3	13	38	68	−30	15
10	Junior	22	4	7	11	38	53	−15	15
11	Deportivo Pereira	22	6	2	14	42	72	−30	14
12	Atlético Bucaramanga	22	0	0	22	11	45	−34	0

Source: RSSSF
(C) Champions

=== Results ===
Home \ Away	BJ	BUC	CAL	CUC	JUN	MAG	MIL	NAC	PER	QUI	SFE	SPB
Boca Juniors		4–1	2–0	3–2	3–1	2–2	1–2	1–0	1–0	2–1	1–1	0–1
Atlético Bucaramanga	0–1 (Note: Atlético Bucaramanga withdrew from the tournament, so the remaining games left in walkover)		0–1	0–1	2–5	0–1	0–1	0–1	0–1	0–1	1–2	0–1
Deportivo Cali	2–2	1–0		3–3	2–2	1–1	2–4	0–1	2–2	1–2	1–0	5–2
Cúcuta Deportivo	2–2	5–3	0–1		3–1	4–0	0–0	2–2	3–0	1–3	5–0	6–0
Junior	1–3	1–0	1–1	2–2		2–0	2–2	0–4	5–0	3–3	1–2	0–3
Unión Magdalena	1–2 (Note: Played again. The original score was 3–1.)	1–0	0–1	1–3	2–1		0–2	3–3	5–1	5–3	1–4	1–3
Millonarios	3–1	5–1	3–1	2–1	4–1	5–3		1–1	5–0	0–1	1–1	4–2
Atlético Nacional	1–1	5–1	1–5	5–2	3–0	5–2	2–2		1–3	3–3	3–2	7–2
Deportivo Pereira	1–5	3–1	1–3	4–5	2–1	4–2	0–2	4–7		3–5	1–2	3–3
Quindío	1–3	2–1	1–1	3–2	6–2	5–2	1–1	4–1	7–2		1–0 (Note: Santa Fe did not submit the required documents, so Atlético Quindío won the match as walkover)	8–3
Santa Fe	5–0	1–0	0–0	4–1	3–3	7–0	1–1	4–1	5–4	3–4		6–0
Sporting	2–4	1–0	2–4	4–5	3–3	0–2	0–1	3–1	2–3	1–1	0–4	

Legend: Blue = home team win; Yellow = draw; Red = away team win.

=== Top goalscorers ===
Rank	Name	Club	Goals
1	(Argentina) Mario Garelli	Atlético Quindío	20
2	(Argentina) Rubén Padín	Santa Fe	19
3	(Argentina) Felipe Marino	Sporting	17
4	(Uruguay) Abraham González	Cúcuta Deportivo	16
4	(Argentina) Rubí Cerioni	Deportivo Cali	16
6	(Paraguay) Francisco Solano Patiño	Boca Juniors	14
6	(Uruguay) Juan Carlos Toja	Cúcuta Deportivo	14
6	(Argentina) Elger Alarcón	Atlético Quindío	14
9	(Argentina) Rubén Deibe	Santa Fe	13
10	(Argentina) Raúl Dimarco	Junior	12

Source: RSSSF.com Colombia 1953
