= Julio Ramírez =

Julio Ramírez may refer to:

- Julio Ramírez (baseball) (born 1977), Major League Baseball center fielder
- Julio Ramirez (academic), professor of psychology
- Julio Ramírez (Uruguayan footballer) (born 1974)
- Julio Ramírez (Paraguayan footballer) (fl. 1922–1925)
- Joel Maximo (Julio Ramirez, born 1979), professional wrestler with The S.A.T.
