= Germán González =

Germán González may refer to:

- Germán González (footballer, born 1947), Colombian football midfielder
- Germán González (footballer, born 1952), Colombian football manager and former defender
- Germán González (baseball) (born 1962), Venezuelan baseball player
