= Manay =

Manay may refer to:

- Manay, Davao Oriental, a municipality in the Philippines
- Alcides Mañay (born 1927), Uruguayan footballer
