= 1950 Campeonato Profesional =

Campeonato Profesional
- Season: 1950
- Champions: Deportes Caldas (1st title)
- Matches: 240
- Goals: 1,006 (4.19 per match)
- Top goalscorer: Casimiro Ávalos (27)
- Biggest home win: Boca Juniors 7–2 Huracán; Boca Juniors 5–0 Junior; Boca Juniors 5–0 Deportivo Pereira; Deportivo Cali 6–1 Millonarios; Independiente Medellín 6–1 Sporting; Santa Fe 5–0 Huracán; Universidad 5–0 Once Deportivo
- Biggest away win: Atlético Municipal 2–7 Santa Fe
- Highest scoring: Huracán 6–6 América

The 1950 Campeonato Profesional was the third season of Colombia's top-flight football league. 16 teams compete against one another and played each weekend. The tournament was notable for being the second year of El Dorado. Deportes Caldas won the league for 1st time in its history after getting 45 points. Millonarios, the defending champion, was 2nd with 43 points.

== Background ==
The tournament was the second year of El Dorado. The debutants teams were Cúcuta Deportivo and Sporting de Barranquilla, while Atlético Junior, who had been replaced by Deportivo Barranquilla the previous year, returned to the tournament. On March 17, the DIMAYOR introduced new rules: All the teams had to wear jersey numbers, all grounds must be properly delimited and the length of the matches had to be respected, etc. On July 1, Huracán and América draw 6-6, being the draw with more goals in the history of the Categoría Primera A.

== League system ==
Every team played two games against each other team, one at home and one away. Teams received two points for a win and one point for a draw. If two or more teams were tied on points, places were determined by goal difference. The team with the most points is the champion of the league.

== Teams ==
Locations of the 1950 Campeonato Profesional teams:
- 1. Barranquilla
- 2. Bogotá
- 3. Bucaramanga
- 4. Cali
- 5. Cúcuta
- 6. Manizales
- 7. Medellín
- 8. Pereira

Team	City	Stadium
América	Cali	Estadio Olímpico Pascual Guerrero
Atlético Bucaramanga	Bucaramanga	Estadio Alfonso López
Atlético Municipal	Medellín^{a}	Estadio San Fernando
Boca Juniors	Cali	Estadio Olímpico Pascual Guerrero
Cúcuta Deportivo	Cúcuta	Estadio General Santander
Deportes Caldas	Manizales	Estadio Palogrande
Deportivo Cali	Cali	Estadio Olímpico Pascual Guerrero
Deportivo Pereira	Pereira	Estadio Libaré
Huracán de Medellín	Medellín	Estadio San Fernando
Independiente Medellín	Medellín	Estadio San Fernando
Junior	Barranquilla	Estadio Romelio Martínez
Millonarios	Bogotá	Estadio Alfonso López Pumarejo
Once Deportivo	Manizales	Estadio Palogrande
Santa Fe	Bogotá	Estadio Alfonso López Pumarejo
Sporting de Barranquilla	Barranquilla	Estadio Romelio Martínez
Universidad	Bogotá	Estadio Alfonso López Pumarejo

^{a} Municipal played its home games at Itagüí

== Final standings ==
Pos	Team	Pld	W	D	L	GF	GA	GD	Pts
1	Deportes Caldas (C)	30	20	5	5	91	48	+43	45
2	Millonarios	30	17	9	4	68	41	+27	43
3	Deportivo Cali	30	18	5	7	73	48	+25	41
4	Independiente Medellín	30	15	4	11	60	45	+15	34
5	Cúcuta Deportivo	30	15	3	12	61	56	+5	33
6	Atlético Bucaramanga	30	13	6	11	51	46	+5	32
7	Boca Juniors	30	12	8	10	79	60	+19	32
8	Santa Fe	30	12	8	10	67	59	+8	32
9	Junior	30	12	7	11	52	57	−5	31
10	América	30	11	8	11	62	64	−2	30
11	Sporting	30	11	7	12	70	79	−9	29
12	Universidad	30	9	5	16	55	75	−20	23
13	Deportivo Pereira	30	7	9	14	62	79	−17	23
14	Huracán	30	7	6	17	57	96	−39	20
15	Atlético Municipal	30	6	4	20	55	79	−24	16
16	Once Deportivo	30	4	8	18	44	75	−31	16

Source: RSSSF
(C) Champions

=== Results ===
Home \ Away	AME	BJ	BUC	CLI	CUC	CLD	HUR	JUN	DIM	MIL	MUN	OND	PER	SFE	SPB	UNI
América		2–2	0–0	3–2	3–0	0–4	6–3	3–1	0–1	2–2	4–1	2–1	4–3	1–2	1–1	3–1
Boca Juniors	5–1		1–3	2–3	2–0	2–1	7–2	5–0	0–1	2–2	2–1	2–0	5–0	3–3	2–2	3–1
Atlético Bucaramanga	3–1	0–4		0–3	0–1	0–4	3–1	1–1	0–2	0–2	4–2	4–0	2–0	4–1	5–2	0–0
Deportivo Cali	5–2	5–2	1–5		3–2	3–2	0–2	3–1	4–1	6–1	2–1	2–0	2–1	2–0	3–4	4–1
Cúcuta Deportivo	3–1	2–5	1–0	0–1		1–2	4–2	3–2	2–0	1–2	1–0	2–0	5–3	1–1	2–1	4–0
Deportes Caldas	2–1	1–0	2–0	3–3	1–1		3–2	4–1	2–0	2–3	5–1	4–1	4–1	3–3	3–0	5–1
Huracán	6–6	2–1	2–3	2–2	3–2	3–7		2–2	2–0	2–5	2–4	1–1	0–4	1–1	5–2	1–4
Junior	2–2	1–1	0–0	2–1	4–3	4–1	6–2		1–0	2–1	2–1	4–1	1–1	3–2	2–3	0–1 (Note: The match result was 2–2, but was awarded 0–1 to Universidad.)
Independiente Medellín	0–0	5–3	3–0	2–2	5–4	3–0	5–1	2–3		2–1	0–1 (Note: Atlético Municipal is awarded with a 0–1 victory by walkover.)	1–2	4–1	1–0	6–1	4–0
Millonarios	2–2	3–3	2–1	2–0	6–2	2–1	1–1	1–1	3–0		2–0	3–0	4–1	0–0	5–2	0–1
Atlético Municipal	2–1	1–3	1–2	0–1	2–2	4–5	2–3	0–1	1–2	1–1		3–2	2–3	2–7	3–6	6–2
Once Deportivo	1–3	2–2	2–2	1–4	1–3	1–2	0–1	2–3	0–0	1–2	2–2		2–0	4–4	3–0	5–5
Deportivo Pereira	3–1	3–3	1–1	1–2	4–1	2–2	3–1	2–1	1–1	4–4	3–3	5–5		0–3	2–4	4–4
Santa Fe	1–0	5–2	2–1	2–2	0–2	3–5	5–0	3–1	3–2	1–3	3–2	1–3	3–4		1–1	4–2
Sporting	3–4	3–3	1–3	1–1	1–4	4–4	6–2	2–1	6–3	0–1	2–4	3–1	3–1	3–1		1–1
Universidad	2–3	5–1	3–4	2–1	1–2	1–4	1–0	1–2	1–4	0–2	4–2	5–0	2–1	1–2	2–2	

Legend: Blue = home team win; Yellow = draw; Red = away team win.

=== Top goalscorers ===
Rank	Name	Club	Goals
1	(Paraguay) Casimiro Ávalos	Deportivo Pereira	27
2	(Argentina) Julio Ávila	Deportes Caldas	24
3	(Argentina) (Colombia) Alfredo Di Stéfano	Millonarios	23
4	(Paraguay) Alejandrino Genes	Boca Juniors	21
4	(Argentina) Fernando Walter	Deportivo Cali	21
6	(Uruguay) Ramón Villaverde	Cúcuta Deportivo	20
7	(Colombia) Carlos Arango	Deportes Caldas	19
8	(Peru) Valeriano López	Deportivo Cali	19

Source: RSSSF.com Colombia 1950
