= 1951 Campeonato Profesional =

Campeonato Profesional
- Season: 1951
- Champions: Millonarios (2nd title)
- Matches: 306
- Goals: 1,271 (4.15 per match)
- Top goalscorer: Alfredo Di Stéfano (32)
- Biggest home win: Deportivo Samarios 12–1 Universidad
- Biggest away win: Huracán 0–8 Santa Fe
- Highest scoring: Deportivo Samarios 12–1 Universidad

The 1951 Campeonato Profesional was the fourth season of Colombia's top-flight football league. 18 teams compete against one another and played each weekend. The tournament was notable for being the third year of El Dorado. Millonarios won the league for 2nd time in its history after getting 60 points. Deportes Caldas, the defending champion, was 10th with 34 points.

== Background ==
The tournament was the third year of El Dorado. The debutants teams were Deportes Quindío and Deportivo Samarios, while Atlético Municipal changed its name to Atlético Nacional.

Deportivo Samarios was founded by the squad of the Hungária FC when it was disbanded. The first team consisted in 10 Colombians, 8 Hungarians, 2 Yugoslavs, 1 Austrian, 1 Argentine, 1 Italian and 1 Romanian. On August 11, Universidad appointed the poet León de Greiff as executive of the team.

== League system ==
Every team played two games against each other team, one at home and one away. Teams received two points for a win and one point for a draw. If two or more teams were tied on points, places were determined by goal difference. The team with the most points is the champion of the league.

== Teams ==
Locations of the 1951 Campeonato Profesional teams:
- 1. Armenia
- 2. Barranquilla
- 3. Bogotá
- 4. Bucaramanga
- 5. Cali
- 6. Cúcuta
- 7. Manizales
- 8. Medellín
- 9. Pereira
- 10. Santa Marta

Team	City	Stadium
América	Cali	Estadio Olímpico Pascual Guerrero
Atlético Bucaramanga	Bucaramanga	Estadio Alfonso López
Atlético Municipal	Medellín^{a}	Estadio San Fernando
Boca Juniors	Cali	Estadio Olímpico Pascual Guerrero
Cúcuta Deportivo	Cúcuta	Estadio General Santander
Deportes Caldas	Manizales	Estadio Palogrande
Deportes Quindío	Armenia	Estadio San José de Armenia
Deportivo Cali	Cali	Estadio Olímpico Pascual Guerrero
Deportivo Pereira	Pereira	Estadio Libaré
Deportivo Samarios	Santa Marta	Estadio Eduardo Santos
Huracán de Medellín	Medellín	Estadio San Fernando
Independiente Medellín	Medellín	Estadio San Fernando
Junior	Barranquilla	Estadio Romelio Martínez
Millonarios	Bogotá	Estadio El Campín
Once Deportivo	Manizales	Estadio Palogrande
Santa Fe	Bogotá	Estadio Alfonso López Pumarejo
Sporting de Barranquilla	Barranquilla	Estadio Romelio Martínez
Universidad	Bogotá	Estadio Alfonso López Pumarejo

^{a} Municipal played its home games at Itagüí

== Final standings ==
Pos	Team	Pld	W	D	L	GF	GA	GD	Pts
1	Millonarios (C)	34	28	4	2	98	29	+69	60
2	Boca Juniors	34	22	5	7	110	55	+55	49
3	Cúcuta Deportivo	34	21	6	7	93	56	+37	48
4	Deportivo Cali	34	19	10	5	82	46	+36	48
5	Deportes Quindío	34	15	9	10	70	62	+8	39
6	Santa Fe	34	14	9	11	90	75	+15	37
7	Sporting	34	14	9	11	78	73	+5	37
8	Junior	34	14	8	12	66	58	+8	36
9	Once Deportivo	34	14	7	13	72	66	+6	35
10	Deportes Caldas	34	14	6	14	77	74	+3	34
11	Deportivo Pereira	34	12	10	12	66	67	−1	34
12	Atlético Bucaramanga	34	14	6	14	55	60	−5	34
13	América	34	11	7	16	66	76	−10	29
14	Deportivo Samarios	34	10	7	17	64	69	−5	27
15	Atlético Nacional	34	7	9	18	54	96	−42	23
16	Independiente Medellín	34	6	7	21	51	92	−41	19
17	Universidad	34	5	4	25	48	126	−78	14
18	Huracán	32	2	3	27	33	93	−60	7

Source: RSSSF
(C) Champions

=== Results ===
Home \ Away	AME	BJ	BUC	CLI	CUC	CLD	HUR	JUN	DIM	MIL	NAC	OND	PER	QUI	SAM	SFE	SPB	UNI
América		0–2	3–4	1–4	1–3	3–1	1–0	0–0	2–0	1–3	1–1	5–1	1–1	1–1	3–1	2–3	4–2	6–2
Boca Juniors	2–1		4–1	5–1	2–3	3–4	9–1	3–2	6–3	0–1	5–1	3–2	2–0	2–2	1–0	3–0	3–3	7–2
Atlético Bucaramanga	6–2	0–2		1–1	2–1	1–0	3–0	1–0	3–1	1–2	4–1	0–2	2–1	1–2	0–0	4–1	0–3	1–4
Deportivo Cali	5–1	2–1	5–1		2–1	2–1	5–2	2–0	4–1	0–0	3–1	1–2	2–1	2–2	1–1	2–2	2–1	7–0
Cúcuta Deportivo	2–0	3–1	5–1	2–2		3–2	4–1	1–0	2–1	2–1	1–1	4–2	1–2	6–2	2–0	2–1	1–2	6–1
Deportes Caldas	7–5	2–3	2–2	3–1	3–3		1–0	3–3	3–1	1–3	1–0	0–3	3–1	4–3	1–2	0–2	3–2	5–1
Huracán	3–3	1–2	0–1	1–1	3–5	1–3		1–2	0–1	0–1	1–5	0–1	0–0	2–3	1–0	0–8	0–1	4–0
Junior	4–0	1–1	3–1	3–1	0–3	1–2	4–2		6–1	1–4	2–3	2–4	3–2	3–1	1–4	2–2	2–1	2–0
Independiente Medellín	1–4	1–4	2–2	0–5	2–0	3–2	1–1	1–4		2–3	3–1	0–0	4–0	0–3	1–2	3–2	1–4	0–0
Millonarios	4–0	5–2	1–0	2–1	3–0	2–2	2–1	0–1	3–2		4–1	3–1	2–0	1–0	2–0	5–1	7–1	5–2
Atlético Nacional	2–3	0–1	2–1	1–2	3–3	2–2	1–1	1–1	2–2	0–7		1–3	0–1	2–1	4–2	4–6	1–2	2–0
Once Deportivo	1–0	2–5	3–1	2–3	2–2	3–2	3–2	4–2	3–3	1–2	1–1		1–1	1–2	3–2	0–1	2–1	8–1
Deportivo Pereira	2–1	1–1	3–1	2–2	1–5	3–2	9–0	2–1	1–1	2–7	2–3	2–2		4–2	4–2	1–2	4–2	2–1
Deportes Quindío	2–2	2–2	1–1	0–0	3–1	3–1	2–1	1–3	2–1	0–4	5–1	3–1	2–2		4–1	5–4	2–1	4–1
Deportivo Samarios	2–3	2–4	0–1	2–2	2–5	1–2	1–0	2–3	4–3	0–3	3–1	4–3	3–1	1–0		2–2	1–1	12–1
Santa Fe	1–1	2–3	2–2	1–3	2–4	2–2	6–2	1–1	4–1	2–2	7–3	1–0	2–2	3–2	3–2		6–2	4–0
Sporting	1–0	3–2	1–3	2–3	2–2	3–2	3–1	1–1	5–3	1–1	2–2	3–2	2–2	2–2	1–1	6–3		5–1
Universidad	2–5	1–5	0–2	0–3	3–5	3–5	1–0	2–2	5–1	0–3	4–0	3–3	2–4	0–1	1–1	2–1	2–5	

Legend: Blue = home team win; Yellow = draw; Red = away team win.

=== Top goalscorers ===
Rank	Name	Club	Goals
1	(Argentina) (Colombia) Alfredo Di Stéfano	Millonarios	31
2	(Argentina) Julio Ávila	Deportes Caldas	30
3	(Argentina) Antonio Báez	Millonarios	28
4	(Paraguay) Alejandrino Genes	Boca Juniors	26
5	(Paraguay) Ángel Berni	Boca Juniors	23
6	(Uruguay) Bibiano Zapirain	Cúcuta Deportivo	22
6	(Argentina) Elger Alarcón	Deportes Quindío	22
8	(Argentina) Fernando Walter	Deportivo Cali	21

Source: RSSSF.com Colombia 1951
