= 1961 Campeonato Profesional =

Campeonato Profesional
- Season: 1961
- Champions: Millonarios (6th title)
- Matches: 264
- Goals: 846 (3.2 per match)
- Top goalscorer: Alberto Perazzo (31)
- Biggest home win: Deportivo Cali 7–0 Deportes Quindío
- Biggest away win: Deportes Tolima 1–5 Cúcuta Deportivo; Deportivo Pereira 0–4 Santa Fe
- Highest scoring: Deportivo Cali 8–2 Deportivo Pereira

The 1961 Campeonato Profesional was the 14th season of Colombia's top-flight football league. 12 teams competed against one another. Millonarios won the league for the 6th time in its history after getting 62 points.

== Background ==
11 teams from the last tournament competed in this one, with Unión Magdalena declining to participate and both Deportes Caldas and Once Deportivo merging into Once Caldas. Millonarios won the championship for the sixth time. The runners-up were Independiente Medellín.

== League system ==
Every team played four games against each other team, two at home and two away. Teams received two points for a win and one point for a draw. If two or more teams were tied on points, places were determined by goal difference. The team with the most points is the champion of the league.

== Teams ==
Locations of the 1961 Campeonato Profesional teams:
- 1. Armenia
- 2. Bogotá
- 3. Bucaramanga
- 4. Cali
- 5. Cúcuta
- 6. Ibagué
- 7. Manizales
- 8. Medellín
- 9. Pereira

Team	City	Stadium
América	Cali	Estadio Olímpico Pascual Guerrero
Atlético Bucaramanga	Bucaramanga	Estadio Alfonso López
Atlético Nacional	Medellín	Estadio Atanasio Girardot
Cúcuta Deportivo	Cúcuta	Estadio General Santander
Deportes Quindío	Armenia	Estadio San José de Armenia
Deportes Tolima	Ibagué	Estadio 10 de Mayo
Deportivo Cali	Cali	Estadio Olímpico Pascual Guerrero
Deportivo Pereira	Pereira	Estadio Alberto Mora Mora
Independiente Medellín	Medellín	Estadio Atanasio Girardot
Millonarios	Bogotá	Estadio El Campín
Once Caldas	Manizales	Estadio Fernando Londoño Londoño
Santa Fe	Bogotá	Estadio El Campín

== Final standings ==
Pos	Team	Pld	W	D	L	GF	GA	GD	Pts	Qualification
1	Millonarios (C)	44	25	12	7	95	56	+39	62	1962 Copa Libertadores First Round
2	Independiente Medellín	44	21	12	11	72	54	+18	54	
3	Santa Fe	44	21	8	15	99	73	+26	50	
4	Cúcuta Deportivo	44	16	15	13	71	66	+5	47	
5	Deportivo Cali	44	17	12	15	75	65	+10	46	
6	Atlético Bucaramanga	44	16	12	16	61	61	0	44	
7	Once Caldas	44	15	13	16	64	58	+6	43	
8	América	44	15	10	19	65	74	−9	40	
9	Deportivo Pereira	44	15	10	19	68	82	−14	40	
10	Deportes Quindío	44	12	13	19	54	91	−37	37	
11	Atlético Nacional	44	13	9	22	69	90	−21	35	
12	Deportes Tolima	44	9	12	23	53	76	−23	30	

Source: RSSSF
(C) Champions

=== Results ===
==== First turn ====
Home \ Away	AME	BUC	CAL	CUC	MED	MIL	NAC	ONC	PER	QUI	SFE	TOL
América		1–0	5–0	2–1	3–4	0–1	2–0	2–2	0–0	2–1	1–1	4–2
Atlético Bucaramanga	0–1		0–2	2–1	2–2	1–0	1–2	1–1	2–0	1–1	2–1	4–3
Deportivo Cali	1–3	2–1		5–0	0–2	1–2	2–0	1–1	8–2	1–2	3–3	2–1
Cúcuta Deportivo	2–0	1–1	1–1		1–1	1–1	1–0	2–4	4–3	1–1	1–1	6–0
Independiente Medellín	2–1	1–1	0–1	0–3		1–0	1–1	3–2	1–0	1–1	1–2	4–1
Millonarios	2–2	3–1	3–2	4–0	2–1		4–2	3–1	5–1	6–0	2–2	3–0
Atlético Nacional	1–2	2–3	1–4	2–1	0–3	1–1		1–3	4–2	4–3	2–1	2–2
Once Caldas	3–3	2–1	0–1	1–2	0–1	2–2	5–1		1–3	3–0	3–0	0–3
Deportivo Pereira	1–0	0–3	2–2	0–2	1–1	2–0	4–1	0–1		2–3	0–4	5–2
Deportes Quindío	2–1	2–2	1–2	2–2	0–3	3–2	1–3	2–1	0–4		2–1	1–0
Santa Fe	4–1	3–1	4–1	3–2	4–4	1–2	3–1	1–1	2–1	3–1		3–0
Deportes Tolima	1–1	2–3	2–0	0–1	2–0	2–2	2–0	0–1	2–1	0–2	1–2	

Legend: Blue = home team win; Yellow = draw; Red = away team win.

==== Second turn ====
Home \ Away	AME	BUC	CAL	CUC	MED	MIL	NAC	ONC	PER	QUI	SFE	TOL
América		1–2	1–2	2–2	2–0	2–0	2–2	1–0	2–1	2–1	3–2	1–2
Atlético Bucaramanga	2–1		3–1	1–3	0–1	0–2	2–1	2–1	0–0	3–0	4–1	0–0
Deportivo Cali	1–1	0–1		3–2	1–1	0–0	2–0	1–2	2–1	7–0	1–1	1–1
Cúcuta Deportivo	1–1	1–1	0–3		1–3	1–0	2–3	2–1	5–1	3–0	1–0	0–0
Independiente Medellín	1–0	4–2	3–1	2–0		2–2	3–0	0–2	1–1	4–0	1–0	2–1
Millonarios	3–1	2–1	3–2	1–1	3–1		5–3	0–0	3–2	2–0	4–2	1–0
Atlético Nacional	3–1	4–0	0–0	0–1	5–2	2–4		3–1	1–2	2–2	2–1	1–1
Once Caldas	4–0	0–0	2–0	0–0	2–0	2–2	1–1		0–1	2–2	1–0	1–0
Deportivo Pereira	2–1	1–0	2–2	1–1	2–2	1–2	1–0	3–1		4–2	2–1	1–1
Deportes Quindío	1–0	1–1	2–2	3–3	0–0	1–1	3–1	1–0	1–2		0–0	3–0
Santa Fe	5–2	4–3	3–0	5–0	1–0	3–2	3–4	4–2	5–2	5–0		3–2
Deportes Tolima	6–1	0–0	0–1	1–5	0–2	2–3	0–0	1–1	1–1	2–0	4–1	

Legend: Blue = home team win; Yellow = draw; Red = away team win.

=== Top goalscorers ===
Rank	Name	Club	Goals
1	(Argentina) Alberto Perazzo	Santa Fe	32
2	(Argentina) Juan Vairo	Independiente Medellín	30
3	(Argentina) Roberto Miravelli	Once Caldas	23
4	(Colombia) Eusebio Escobar	Deportivo Pereira	21
5	(Argentina) / (Uruguay) Juan Hohberg	Cúcuta Deportivo	19
6	(Argentina) Osvaldo Panzutto	Santa Fe	18
7	(Colombia) Delio Gamboa	Millonarios	15
7	(Argentina) Rubén Pizarro	Millonarios	15
9	(Argentina) Walter Marcolini	América	14
9	(Uruguay) Luis Piriz	Cúcuta Deportivo	14

Source: RSSSF.com Colombia 1961
