= 1948 Campeonato Profesional =

Campeonato Profesional
- Season: 1948
- Dates: 15 August – 19 December 1948
- Champions: Santa Fe (1st title)
- Matches: 90
- Goals: 409 (4.54 per match)
- Top goalscorer: Alfredo Castillo (31)
- Biggest home win: Santa Fe 6–0 Ind. Medellín; Junior 6–0 Once Deportivo; Millonarios 6–0 Once Deportivo
- Biggest away win: Ind. Medellín 3–7 Millonarios
- Highest scoring: Millonarios 7–4 Deportes Caldas; Junior 8–3 Ind. Medellín

The 1948 Campeonato Profesional was the first season of Colombia's top-flight football league. The tournament was started on 15 August, with the match between Atlético Municipal and Universidad. Ten teams competed against one another and played each weekend until 19 December.

Independiente Santa Fe were the champions, after earning 27 points in 18 matches played. Atlético Junior were the runners-up and Deportes Caldas ended in third place. Striker Alfredo Castillo, who played for Millonarios, ended as the season's top scorer.

== Background ==
The creation of the Colombian Football Federation dates back to 1924, but it was not until 1948 that a professional club tournament was played, with the creation of Dimayor on 27 June 1948. Ten teams signed up for the tournament, with each one having to pay a fee of 1,000 pesos: one from Barranquilla, three from Bogotá, two from Cali, two from Manizales, and two from Medellín. 252 players were registered as follows: 182 Colombians, 13 Argentines, 8 Peruvians, 5 Uruguayans, 2 Chileans, 2 Ecuadorians, 1 Dominican and 1 Spanish.

== League system ==
Every team played two games against each other team, one at home and one away. Teams received two points for a win and one point for a draw. If two or more teams were tied on points, places were determined by goal difference. The team with the most points was the champion of the league.

== Teams ==
Locations of the 1948 Campeonato Profesional teams:
- 1. Barranquilla
- 2. Bogotá
- 3. Cali
- 4. Manizales
- 5. Medellín
- 6. Pereira

The competition was contested by 10 clubs, all of which were founding members of Dimayor. Out of the 13 founding members of the entity, only Victoria F.C., Huracán de Medellín, and Boca Juniors de Cali did not enter the competition, with the latter two joining the league for the following edition.

Team	City	Stadium
América	Cali	Olímpico Pascual Guerrero
Atlético Municipal	Medellín (Note: Atlético Municipal and Independiente Medellín played their home matches in Itagüí.)	Hipódromo San Fernando
Deportes Caldas	Manizales	Fernando Londoño Londoño
Deportivo Cali	Cali	Olímpico Pascual Guerrero
Independiente Medellín	Medellín	Hipódromo San Fernando
Junior	Barranquilla	Romelio Martínez
Millonarios	Bogotá	El Campín
Once Deportivo	Manizales	Fernando Londoño Londoño
Santa Fe	Bogotá	Alfonso López Pumarejo
Universidad	Bogotá (Note: Universidad played their home matches in Pereira.)	Alberto Mora Mora

== Final standings ==
Pos	Team	Pld	W	D	L	GF	GA	GD	Pts
1	Santa Fe (C)	18	12	3	3	57	29	+28	27
2	Junior	18	11	1	6	48	35	+13	23
3	Deportes Caldas	18	8	4	6	45	40	+5	20
4	Millonarios	18	9	1	8	58	45	+13	19
5	América	18	8	2	8	40	31	+9	18
6	Atlético Municipal	18	7	4	7	29	36	−7	18
7	Independiente Medellín	18	7	3	8	37	49	−12	17
8	Deportivo Cali	18	6	4	8	35	41	−6	16
9	Once Deportivo	18	5	4	9	32	50	−18	14
10	Universidad	18	3	2	13	28	53	−25	8

Source: RSSSF
(C) Champions

== Results ==
Home \ Away	AME	CAL	DCA	JUN	DIM	MIL	MUN	OND	SFE	UNI
América		1–0	5–1	3–0	4–0	4–0	3–0	2–2	1–2	2–1
Deportivo Cali	4–3		2–2	2–4	1–1	2–4	4–1	2–2	1–0	2–5
Deportes Caldas	1–3	3–2		3–1	4–1	3–0	3–1	3–2	1–1	5–2
Junior	4–2	2–0	1–0		8–3	5–2	1–0	6–0	2–4	4–0
Independiente Medellín	1–1	0–1	1–3	3–2		3–7	2–1	5–2	2–0	5–0
Millonarios	2–0	3–2	7–4	6–1	5–2		3–4	6–0	1–2	4–1
Atlético Municipal	3–2	4–3	3–1	1–1	0–3	2–2		1–0	2–1	2–0
Once Deportivo	2–1	3–1	3–5	0–2	3–3	2–1	2–2		2–5	3–1
Santa Fe	5–1	3–3	2–2	4–1	6–0	5–3	5–2	2–1		6–3
Universidad	3–2	1–2	2–2	2–3	1–2	3–2	0–0	2–3	1–4	

Source: RSSSF
Legend: Blue = home team win; Yellow = draw; Red = away team win.

== Top goalscorers ==
Rank	Name	Club	Goals
1	(Argentina) Alfredo Castillo	Millonarios	31
2	(Spain) (Argentina) Jesús María Lires	Santa Fe	20
3	(Argentina) Germán Anton	Santa Fe	18
4	(Argentina) Pedro Cabillón	Millonarios	14
4	(Colombia) Jaime Cardona	Deportes Caldas	14
6	(Colombia) Rigoberto García	Junior	11
6	(Colombia) Carlos Arango	Deportes Caldas	11
8	(Colombia) Ricardo López	Universidad	10
9	(Argentina) Ricardo Ruiz	Deportivo Cali	9
10	(Colombia) Octavio Carrillo	Junior	8

Source: RSSSF.com Colombia 1948
