= Carlos Carrillo Nalda =

Peruvian footballer and manager (1909–1994)

Personal information
- Date of birth: 10 April 1909
- Place of birth: Lima, Peru
- Date of death: 1994
- Position: Defender

Senior career*
Years	Team	Apps	(Gls)
1929–1930	Sport Progreso		
1931–1935	Ciclista Lima		
1936–1937	Sport Boys	0	(0)

Managerial career
- 1948: Independiente Santa Fe
- * Club domestic league appearances and goals

Carlos Carrillo Nalda (1909–1994) was a Peruvian football manager and former player. As a coach, he won the first ever professional championship in Colombia with Independiente Santa Fe in 1948.

== Biography ==
=== Playing career ===
Central defender Carlos Carrillo played for Sport Progreso in the late 1920s before moving to Ciclista Lima. He was part of the Ciclista Lima team's central defensive pairing when they toured several South American countries in 1931 (this tour, considered the longest ever undertaken by a Peruvian club, lasted nearly a year).

In 1936, he joined Sport Boys where he only played friendly matches.

=== Managerial career ===
Replacing Argentinian Alfredo Cuezzo as manager of Independiente Santa Fe in 1948, Carlos Carrillo led the club to the national championship (12 wins, 3 draws, and 3 losses). Julio Gaviria (goalkeeper), José Kaor Dokú (midfielder), and Roberto Gámez (forward) formed the core of this team.

Carrillo thus became the first manager to win the Colombian championship and also the first foreigner to achieve this honor.

== Honours ==
=== Manager ===
Independiente Santa Fe

- Campeonato Profesional: 1948
