= Francisco Solano Patiño =

Paraguayan footballer (1923-1990)

Personal information
- Full name: Francisco Solano Patiño
- Date of birth: 1923
- Place of birth: Formosa, Argentina
- Date of death: 17 June 1990
- Place of death: Paraguay
- Position: Striker

Senior career*
| Years | Team | Apps | (Gls) |
| – | Sol de América | | |
| – | Guaraní | | |
| 1950–1954 | Boca Juniors de Cali | 98 | (68) |
| 1954 | Huracán | 1 | (0) |
| 1955–1956 | Quindío | 34 | (20) |
| 1957–1958 | Pereira | 73 | (39) |
| 1959 | Deportivo Cali | 3 | (1) |

Managerial career
- Sportivo Luqueño
- 1961–1962: Deportivo Pereira
- 1964–1965: América de Cali
- * Club domestic league appearances and goals

Francisco Solano Patiño (1923 – 17 June 1990) was a Paraguayan football striker.

== Career ==
Born in Formosa, Argentina, Solano Patiño moved to Paraguay where he played football with Club Sol de América and Club Guaraní. In 1950, he moved abroad to play in the Colombian league with Boca Juniors de Cali. He had a brief spell in the Argentina Primera Division with Club Atlético Huracán during 1954, before moving to Colombia where he would finish his career.

In 1956, Solano Patiño won the league with Deportes Quindío. He is one of the all-time Colombian league's leading goal-scorers with 147 goals.

== Personal ==
Solano Patiño died in June 1990.
