= Arturo Boyacá =

Colombian footballer and manager (born 1957)

Personal information
- Full name: Arturo Boyacá Gamboa
- Date of birth: 17 April 1957 (age 69)
- Place of birth: Bogotá, Colombia

Youth career
- Santa Fe

Senior career*
Years	Team	Apps	(Gls)
- Santa Fe

Managerial career
- 1993: Deportes Tolima
- 1993–1994: Santa Fe
- 1995–1996: Deportes Quindío
- 1997: Minervén
- 1999–2002: Santa Fe (assistant)
- 2003: Santa Fe
- 2004: Olmedo (assistant)
- 2005: Aucas (assistant)
- 2007: Academia
- 2009–2010: Santa Fe (assistant)
- 2010: Unión Magdalena
- 2011: Deportivo Lara (assistant)
- 2011: Santa Fe
- 2013: Deportes Quindío
- 2014: Boyacá Chicó
- 2016–2017: La Equidad
- 2019: Santa Fe (youth)
- 2022: Patriotas
- * Club domestic league appearances and goals

Arturo Boyacá Gamboa (born 17 April 1957) is a Colombian football manager and former player.

== Career ==
Born in Bogotá, Boyacá played for Independiente Santa Fe as a senior. After retiring, he began his managerial career with Deportes Tolima, before being named in charge of Santa Fe in August 1993.

After managing Deportes Quindío and Venezuelan side Minervén, Boyacá returned to Santa Fe in 1999 to take over the youth categories. On 21 November 2002, he replaced Dragan Miranović at the helm of the first team.

Boyacá was Miranović's assistant in the following years, at Ecuadorian sides Olmedo and Aucas. He returned to managerial duties in 2007, with Categoría Primera B side Academia.

On 18 August 2010, after a period back at Santa Fe as an assistant, Boyacá was named manager of Unión Magdalena. He opted to leave the club in December to join Germán González's staff at Venezuelan side Deportivo Lara, but returned to his home country in the following year to take over Santa Fe. Dismissed on 19 September 2011, he spent more than a year without a club before being appointed in charge of Quindío on 12 June 2013.

Boyacá resigned from Quindío on 24 September 2013, and worked at Boyacá Chicó in 2014. On 25 April 2016, he was appointed La Equidad manager, but was sacked on 1 June of the following year.

On 7 January 2019, Boyacá returned to Santa Fe as manager of the youth categories, but left the club in July. On 10 February 2022, he was named at the helm of Patriotas Boyacá, but left on 18 May.
