= 1949 Campeonato Profesional =

Campeonato Profesional
- Season: 1949
- Dates: 25 April – 4 December 1949
- Champions: Millonarios (1st title)
- Matches: 186
- Goals: 820 (4.41 per match)
- Top goalscorer: Pedro Cabillón (42 goals)
- Biggest home win: Santa Fe 10–2 Huracán
- Biggest away win: Atlético Municipal 0–6 Deportes Caldas
- Highest scoring: Santa Fe 10–3 Deportivo Pereira

The 1949 Campeonato Profesional was the second season of Colombia's top-flight football league. The tournament started on 25 April and ended on 4 December, with 14 teams competing against one another and playing each weekend. This tournament was famous for marking the beginning of El Dorado. Millonarios won their first title in this season, defeating Deportivo Cali in a tiebreaker final series which was played as both teams ended tied for first place with 44 points. Santa Fe, the defending champion, ended in third place with 39 points.

== Background ==
The season was notable for being the beginning of El Dorado, period during which many international football stars arrived to the Colombian league, especially from Argentina, due to the protests that were taking place in that country. The tournament began on 25 April 1949. The debutant teams were Atlético Bucaramanga, Boca Juniors de Cali, Deportivo Barranquilla, Deportivo Pereira and Huracán de Medellín. This year Universidad returned to Bogotá. Deportivo Barranquilla participated to replace Atlético Junior, who represented Colombia in the South American Championship. Deportivo Barranquilla only played 21 of the 26 league matches.

== League system ==
Every team played two games against each other team, one at home and one away. Teams received two points for a win and one point for a draw. If two or more teams were tied on points for positions other than first, places were determined by goal difference. The team with the most points was the champion of the league. In case that two teams tied for first place, a tiebreaker final series was to be played to decide the champions.

== Teams ==
Locations of the 1949 Campeonato Profesional teams:
- 1. Barranquilla
- 2. Bogotá
- 3. Bucaramanga
- 4. Cali
- 5. Manizales
- 6. Medellín
- 7. Pereira

The tournament was contested by 14 clubs, with Atlético Bucaramanga, Boca Juniors de Cali, Deportivo Barranquilla, Deportivo Pereira and Huracán de Medellín competing for the first time. Deportivo Barranquilla replaced the previous season's runners-up Junior, who were chosen to represent Colombia at the 1949 South American Championship.

Team	City	Stadium
América	Cali	Olímpico Pascual Guerrero
Atlético Bucaramanga	Bucaramanga	Alfonso López
Atlético Municipal	Medellín (Note: Atlético Municipal, Huracán and Independiente Medellín played their home matches in Itagüí.)	Hipódromo de San Fernando
Boca Juniors	Cali	Olímpico Pascual Guerrero
Deportes Caldas	Manizales	Fernando Londoño Londoño
Deportivo Barranquilla	Barranquilla	Romelio Martínez
Deportivo Cali	Cali	Olímpico Pascual Guerrero
Deportivo Pereira	Pereira	Alberto Mora Mora
Huracán	Medellín	Hipódromo de San Fernando
Independiente Medellín	Medellín	Hipódromo de San Fernando
Millonarios	Bogotá	El Campín
Once Deportivo	Manizales	Fernando Londoño Londoño
Santa Fe	Bogotá	Alfonso López Pumarejo
Universidad	Bogotá	Alfonso López Pumarejo

== Final standings ==
Pos	Team	Pld	W	D	L	GF	GA	GD	Pts	Qualification
1	Millonarios (C)	26	20	4	2	99	35	+64	44	Final
2	Deportivo Cali	26	20	4	2	89	41	+48	44	Final
3	Santa Fe	26	17	5	4	102	50	+52	39	
4	Deportes Caldas	26	16	0	10	69	53	+16	32	
5	Independiente Medellín	26	12	5	9	58	60	−2	29	
6	Universidad	26	9	9	8	46	42	+4	27	
7	Atlético Municipal	26	8	8	10	40	60	−20	24	
8	Boca Juniors	26	9	5	12	45	58	−13	23	
9	Once Deportivo	26	9	2	15	40	66	−26	20	
10	América	26	7	4	15	53	67	−14	18	
11	Atlético Bucaramanga	26	7	4	15	48	81	−33	18	
12	Huracán	26	6	5	15	47	75	−28	17	
13	Deportivo Barranquilla	26	5	5	16	34	49	−15	15	
14	Deportivo Pereira	26	4	6	16	44	77	−33	14	

Source: RSSSF
(C) Champions

=== Results ===
Home \ Away	AME	BJC	BUC	CAL	DBA	DCA	HUR	DIM	MIL	MUN	OND	PER	SFE	UNI
América		3–4	1–3	1–4	4–1	2–6	2–1	4–1	4–5	1–2	2–0	5–1	3–4	3–3
Boca Juniors	1–3		2–3	3–5	1–0 (Note: Deportivo Barranquilla withdrew from the tournament, so the remaining games were awarded as walkovers.)	3–1	2–1	5–1	4–3	1–0	3–1	1–1	1–1	0–2
Atlético Bucaramanga	1–2	2–1		1–5	3–1	2–3	2–1	2–2	2–5	4–3	2–3	1–2	1–3	1–1
Deportivo Cali	1–0	4–1	6–1		1–0	3–1	4–0	3–1	3–3	6–3	7–2	4–2	2–2	3–0
Deportivo Barranquilla	1–1	1–0	6–2	3–3		1–0	7–2	2–0	2–2	0–1	0–1	0–1	0–1	2–2
Deportes Caldas	2–0	6–2	7–3	1–4	5–0		5–2	2–1	1–5	2–3	4–1	5–4	0–3	0–2
Huracán	2–1	3–2	7–4	3–4	0–0	3–2		1–2	2–2	0–0	2–3	3–4	2–2	4–2
Independiente Medellín	2–2	6–3	4–1	3–2	1–0	5–3	2–0		1–6	0–0	4–1	4–1	3–2	2–5
Millonarios	1–0 (Note: Points awarded to Millonarios because two suspended América players participated in the match.)	2–0	5–1	0–2	5–0	3–0	5–1	4–0		6–0	3–0	3–2	2–2	3–1
Atlético Municipal	3–1	2–2	1–1	1–2	3–2	0–6	1–2	2–4	1–5		3–2	1–1	2–6	1–1
Once Deportivo	2–1	1–1	2–1	3–4	2–1	0–1	2–1	0–1	2–5	1–2		2–1	2–6	1–0
Deportivo Pereira	3–3	1–2	1–2	1–4	0–3	0–1	4–1	4–4	0–5	1–1	4–4		1–3	1–2
Santa Fe	7–3	5–0	5–0	4–3	6–2	2–3	10–2	3–1	3–6	3–3	4–1	10–3		1–4
Universidad	6–1	0–0	2–2	1–1	1–0	0–1	1–1	3–3	1–5	0–1	3–1	3–0	0–4	

Source: RSSSF
Legend: Blue = home team win; Yellow = draw; Red = away team win.

=== Final ===
20 November 1949

Deportivo Cali	0–1	Millonarios
	Report	Pedernera 57' (pen.)

Estadio Olímpico Pascual Guerrero, Cali
Referee: Felipe Gregorio
4 December 1949

Millonarios	3–2	Deportivo Cali
Di Stéfano 24'; Pedernera 30' (pen.); Castillo 77'	Report	V. López 44'; Giúdice 84'

Estadio Olímpico Pascual Guerrero, Cali
Referee: Orlando Troccoli

=== Top goalscorers ===
Rank	Name	Club	Goals
1	(Argentina) Pedro Cabillón	Millonarios	42
2	(Argentina) Germán Antón	Santa Fe	30
3	(Peru) Valeriano López	Deportivo Cali	24
4	(Colombia) Carlos Arango	Deportes Caldas	19
4	(Peru) Guillermo Barbadillo	Deportivo Cali	19
6	(Colombia) Ricardo Aycardy	Deportivo Barranquilla	18
7	(Costa Rica) Luciano Campos	Independiente Medellín	17
7	(Argentina) Luis López García	Santa Fe	17
7	(Argentina) Ricardo Ruiz Peso	Deportivo Cali	17
10	(Argentina) Alfredo Castillo	Millonarios	15

Source: RSSSF.com Colombia 1949
