= Carlos Carrillo Parodi =

Carlos Carrillo Parodi, medical microbiologist, professor and founder of the University Cayetano Heredia, was National Coordinator of the Global Programme of eradication of smallpox in Peru in 1972, founding member of the Society of Infectious Diseases in 1978, and Head of the National Institute of Health in two periods. In 1992 he was National Coordinator of the programme for the eradication of cholera in Peru. Recognized as an expert in National Public Health and Climate Change in 1999/2001. In 2003, is incorporated as Academic number by the National Academy of Medicine, with more than 70 publications in national and international journals. Credited with the IDSA's Award Kass (Infectious Diseases Society of Americas) in 2004, in Boston and appointed Member of the Consultative Council of the Foundation Institute Hipolito Unanue in 2006.

Propulsor of the National Network of Reference Laboratories in Public Health.

== Awards and distinctions ==
1. “Protector in behalf of the Nicaragua’s population” Certify (Nov. 23, 1991) Signed by Lic. Arnoldo Alleman, Mayor of Managua Presented to C. Carrillo-Parodi, for leadership & contribution to the establishment of a national strategy program for the Prevention of Cholera Epidemic in Nicaragua (November, 11 thr. 25, 91)
2. 2000 Hipólito Unanue Foundation Award for Research in Medical Sciences. February, 2000, Lima, Perú. “Serological Markers for Viral Hepatitis Virus B after vaccination among natives from Huanta-Perú, 1994-7”
3. 1998 Concytec Org. Award “Genetic Polimorfism Profile of the Yellow Fever Virus from Perú” 1998. Carlos Carrillo-Parodi, Isabel Montoya, María García. Final Report April 2000
4. 1998 Concytec Org. Award “Gen Polymorphism Profile of the Dengue Virus Proteín among several Peruvian serotypes” . 1998. Isabel Montoya, Susan Douglas, C. Carrillo-Parodi., Final Report, October 2000
5. IDSA's 2004 Kass Award. Dres. Karen J. Vigil, Javier Adachi, Herbert L. Dupont, C. Carrillo-Parodi.. “Enteropathogenic Escherichia coli (EPEC) as a cause of Diarrhea in Adult Peruvians in Lima, Perú, 2000-2004” Boston, Mass. September 30 – October 3, 2004
6. Member of the Forty Year Membership Club. Presented to C. Carrillo-Parodi. In appreciation for loyal support and dedicated service to the Society, and in recognition of contributions to Science. Signed by James Tiedje, President, ASM, June 17, 2005.
7. Member of the Consultant Board of the Hipólito Unanue Institute, Foundation. Diploma presented by the President of the Foundation Agustín Iza Stoll. September 19, 2006.

== Professional experience in the Public Health Ministry ==
1. 1961 Assistant, Vaccines & Biological Products’ División, Instituto Nacional de Salud, Perú.
2. 1964 Head, Vaccine Production Unit, Biological Products Division, National Institute of Health, Perú.
3. 1965/1970 Head, Smallpox Vaccine Department, National Institute of Health, Perú.
4. 1970/1972 Head, Smallpox Vaccine Division, National Institute of Health, Perú.
5. 1970/1972 National Coordinator, Smallpox Eradication World Program- Perú, PAHO/WHO
6. 1973/1977 National Supervisor, National Committee for the Smallpox Eradication in Perú (NIH-Perú)
7. 1973/1977 National Coordinator, National Intersectorial Program for the Eradication of Brucellosis, Perú. PAHO/WHO
8. 1977/1979 Head, Microbiology Division, Quality Control Center, National Institute of Health, Perú.
9. 1979/1980 Head, Biological Production Division, National Institute of Health, Lima, Perú.
10. 1982/1983 Commissioner, Rationalizacion & Administration Office, Public Health Ministry, Perú.
11. 1985 VAN National Program, Assistant for the Minister of Public Health, Perú.
12. 1985 Supervisor for Sectorial I Program, National Hospital Cayetano Heredia, Ministry of Health, Lima, Perú.
13. 1990/1991 Technical Director, National Institute of Health, Ministry of Health, Lima, Perú.
14. 1990 Representing for the Mr. Minister of Health, II Meeting of Ministers of the Andean Area.
15. 1990/1992 Head, National Institute of Health, Perú. (INS-OPD), Public Health Ministry, Lima, Perú. November 1990 to March 1992
16. 1990 Representing Ministry of Health, October 1990. III Internacional Meeting for HIV´S Laboratory Director from Latin América, Ottawa, Canadá.
17. 1991 National Coordinator for the Peruvian Control & Eradication Program of Cholera in Perú. From February 1991 to April 1992.
18. 1990 Organizer of the I International Meeting for Directors of the National Institutes of Health, from Latino América. Lima. Julio 1991.
19. 1990 Organizer of the I Internacional Workshop for the Standardization of Cholera Laboratory Diagnosis, National Institute of Health (INS-OPD) July 1991, Lima- Perú
20. 1991/ Representing Ministry of Health, Consultant Council for the Peruvian Project on Primatology “Manuel Moro”, NIH/OPS/OMS, Iquitos, Perú.
21. 1991/1993 Organizer & President, National Cholera's Laboratory Network 1992, Public Health Ministry of Perú
22. 1993/1994 Minister Assistant, Public Health Ministry of Perú.
23. 1993/ Director, Member of CERPER S.A., Board of Directors, Fishing Ministry, Callao-1994. Perú.
24. 1994/1999 Head, National Institute of Health (INS-OPD), Lima, Perú. April 1994 to March 1999
25. 1995 High Level Member for the Governmental National Commission, to the European Union for Sanitary Certifications Bruselas, Bélgica. June 1995, Restrictions on the importation of Peruvian Seafoods after Cholera Epidemic.
26. 1995 Member of the Board of Directors, III International Meeting for Directors of the National Institutes of Health, from Latin América. OMS/OPS. April-La Paz, Bolivia.
27. 1997 High Level Member for the Governmental National Commission, March 1997. to the Ministry of Health of Spain, Madrid, Spain. Sanitary Certifications. Restriction for Peruvian Exportation of Asparragous & Botulism Toxin to Spain.
28. 1999/2001 National Expert in Public Health & Climatic Change (CONAM), Lima, Perú. National Designation.
29. 2003 National Institute for Cancer. Consultant for the Head of the Institute. Since January 2003. Lima, Perú.

== Membership in national medical societies ==
1. National Academy of Medicine, since August 2003
2. Colegio Medico del Peru
3. Asociació Peruana de Microbiologica, founder member, 1961
4. Asociación Medica Daniel A Carrion, since 1963
5. Sociedad Peruana de Patolgia, since 1970
6. Asociación Peruana de Infecciosas y Tropicales, founder member, 1989

== Membership in international medical societies ==
1. American Society for Microbiology, since 1965
2. New York Academy of Sciences, since 1978
3. American Society of Tropical Medicine and Hygiene, since 1998
