= Iván Salazar =

Argentine footballer

Personal information
- Full name: Iván Ernesto Salazar Aleijon
- Date of birth: 28 January 1998 (age 28)
- Place of birth: Buenos Aires, Argentina
- Height: 1.77 m (5 ft 10 in)
- Position: Midfielder

Team information
- Current team: Tacuarembó
- Number: 5

Youth career
- Montevideo Wanderers
- Plaza Colonia

Senior career*
Years	Team	Apps	(Gls)
2018–2021	Plaza Colonia	21	(1)
2021	→ La Luz (loan)		
2022	Colón		
2023–	Tacuarembó	45	(1)
- * Club domestic league appearances and goals as of 15 September 2024

Iván Ernesto Salazar Aleijon (born 28 January 1998) is an Argentine football player who plays as a midfielder for Tacuarembó in the Uruguayan Segunda División.

== Career ==
=== Plaza Colonia ===
A graduate of the club's youth academy, Salazar made his league debut on 8 September 2018, scoring in a 1–1 draw with Oriental. Prior to the 2021 season, he and several teammates tested positive for COVID-19, causing him to miss the club's opening match of the season against Torque.

== Career statistics ==
=== Club ===
As of match played 9 November 2020

Appearances and goals by club, season and competition
Club	Season	League			Cup		Continental (Note: Includes Copa Sudamericana)		Other		Total	
Club	Season	Division	Apps	Goals	Apps	Goals	Apps	Goals	Apps	Goals	Apps	Goals
Plaza Colonia	2018	Uruguayan Segunda División	2	1	—	—	—	—	—	—	2	1
Plaza Colonia	2019	Uruguayan Primera División	6	0	—	—	—	—	—	—	6	0
Plaza Colonia	2020	Uruguayan Primera División	13	0	—	—	1	0	—	—	14	0
Plaza Colonia	2021	Uruguayan Primera División	0	0	—	—	—	—	—	—	0	0
Career total			21	1	—	—	1	0	—	—	22	1
