= José Kaor Dokú =

Colombian footballer (1924–2022)

José Kaoru Dokú
Personal information
- Full name: José Kaoru Dokú Bermejo
- Date of birth: 16 May 1924
- Place of birth: Colombia
- Date of death: 20 December 2022 (aged 98)
- Place of death: Colombia
- Position: Defender

Senior career*
Years	Team	Apps	(Gls)
1948–1950	Santa Fe		
1953	Santa Fe		
1956–1957	Millonarios		
- * Club domestic league appearances and goals

José Kaoru Doku Bermejo (16 May 1924 – 20 December 2022) was a Colombian footballer who played as a defender.

== Football career ==
Doku played for Colombian side Santa Fe, helping the club win their first league title.

== Military career ==
Doku served in the Colombian military.
