= Julio Ramírez (Uruguayan footballer) =

Uruguayan footballer (born 1974)

Personal information
- Full name: Julio César Ramirez Villa
- Date of birth: 30 April 1974 (age 52)
- Place of birth: Montevideo, Uruguay
- Height: 1.80 m (5 ft 11 in)
- Position: Defender

Senior career*
Years	Team	Apps	(Gls)
?–2004	Montevideo Wanderers		
2005	Audax Italiano		
2005	Miramar Misiones		
2006–2009	Progreso		
- * Club domestic league appearances and goals

Julio César Ramirez Villa (born 30 April 1974) is a Uruguayan former professional footballer who played as a defender, spending the majority of his career in Uruguay for Montevideo Wanderers, Miramar Misiones and Progreso. He also had a short stint in Chile for Audax Italiano.

== Career ==
Ramírez joined Montevideo Wanderers in 1988 at the age of 13.

Despite playing as a defender for the Wanderers, Ramírez became known as the "Prado Sniper" (Spanish: El francotirador del Prado) for his goalscoring - he often took penalties and free kicks for the team.

Ramírez left Montevideo Wanderers to join Audax Italiano ahead of the 2005 Chilean Torneo Apertura.

In mid-2005, Ramírez returned to Uruguay to join Miramar Misiones.

After joining Progreso in 2006, he was part of the team that won the 2006 Uruguayan Segunda División.
