= Deportes Quindío =

Colombian football club based in Armenia

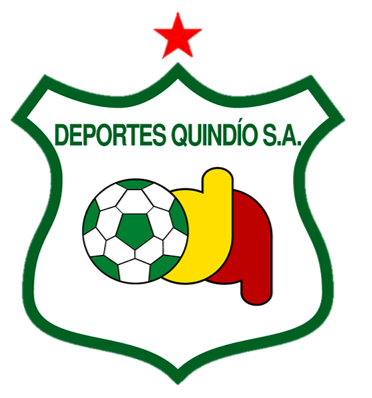
- Full name: Deportes Quindío S.A.
- Nicknames: Los Cuyabros (from Cuyabra, a type of inedible pumpkin), Los Cafeteros (The Coffee Growers), El Milagroso (The Miraculous)
- Founded: 8 January 1951; 75 years ago
- Ground: Centenario
- Capacity: 21,500
- President: Jesús Hernando Ángel
- Head coach: Harold Rivera
- League: Categoría Primera B
- 2025: Primera B, 9th of 16
- Website: deportesquindio.com.co
Home colours	Away colours

Deportes Quindío is a Colombian professional football club based in Armenia that currently plays in the Categoría Primera B. The club was founded on 8 January 1951, and its best achievement was winning the 1956 league tournament. They play their home games at the Centenario stadium. The club was called Atlético Quindío from 1953 to 1963.

== History ==
Deportes Quindío was founded on 8 January 1951, after a group of high-ranking personalities from the city of Armenia, at that time still part of the Caldas Department, hired the players of Argentine team Rosario Wanders, which by the end of 1950 was on a tour of Colombia. After several talks with manager Próspero Fabrini and Moisés Emilio Reuben, who were in charge of the Argentine squad, an agreement was reached and the entire team stayed at Armenia. Its first official match was played against Universidad Nacional at the Estadio Alfonso López Pumarejo in Bogotá, which they won 1–0, with a goal by Alfredo L'Spina, whilst its first home match was played on 19 March 1951 against Deportes Caldas at Estadio San José, winning 3–1 with a brace by Roberto Urruti and a goal by Mario Garelli.

In 1953, the club changed its name to Atlético Quindío per decision made by the then Mayor of Armenia, and finished as runner-up in that year's league tournament, behind Millonarios. It followed up with another runner-up finish in 1954, a third place in the following season, and their first title in 1956 when they finished three points ahead of Millonarios. The team featured players such as Julio César Asciolo, Manuel Dante Pais, José Francisco Lombardo, Nelson "El Viejito" Vargas, Ricardo "El Pibe" Díaz, Álvaro Lahidalga; Alejandro Carrillo, Jaime "El Manco" Gutiérrez, Francisco Solano Patiño, Alejandrino Génes and Roberto "Benitín" Urruti, and also had the tournament's top scorer in Jaime Gutiérrez, who scored 21 goals. In 1956 they also won the Copa Cicrodeportes, in which they played against Millonarios, Independiente Santa Fe, and Ecuadorian side Barcelona de Guayaquil. Deportes Quindío became the first Colombian champion hailing from a city other than a department capital (as the Quindío Department was not established and incorporated into the political division of Colombia until 1966), as well as the only Colombian champion unable to take part in the Copa Libertadores, which started to be played since 1960.

After decades of irregular campaigns and ups and downs, ranging from a last place finish in 1966 to appearances in the final hexagonal in the 70s, Deportes Quindío made an outstanding campaign in the final stretch of the 1996–97 season, with players such as strikers Daniel Tílger and Rubén Darío Hernández, midfielders Marquinho and Juan Guillermo Villa, defenders Robinson Rojas, Alexánder Posada, and Frank Rengifo, keeper Darío Aguirre, team captain Jorge Iván Victoria and Óscar Héctor Quintabani as manager. The team made it to the finals of the Torneo Adecuación but were beaten there by Atlético Bucaramanga and prevented from playing the finals against América de Cali with a late goal by Orlando Ballesteros in the second leg. Nevertheless, the defeat in the Adecuación finals qualified Deportes Quindío to the 1998 Copa CONMEBOL, where they were eliminated by Brazilian side Sampaio Corrêa in the quarter-finals. In 1998, Quindío made it to the semi-finals in the league, finishing in seventh place in the overall table and qualifying to the next year's Copa CONMEBOL, in which they lost to Venezuelan side Estudiantes de Mérida on penalties in the first round.

In 2000, one year after the 1999 Armenia earthquake that devastated the region, Deportes Quindío ended the season in last place of the overall table and were relegated to Categoría Primera B for the first time, but were immediately promoted back to the top tier by winning the 2001 Primera B tournament with Eduardo Lara as manager. Promotion was sealed on 21 October 2001 with one matchday to go, with Quindío beating Deportivo Rionegro 3–1 at home, while Chicó failed to defeat Unión Magdalena. In their return to Primera A, Quindío were able to avoid relegation consistently while also inflicting upsets such as a 6–1 thrashing of Millonarios in 2007. In the 2008 Apertura tournament, and under the managerial direction of Néstor Otero, Deportes Quindío advanced to the semi-final stage for the first time since the league started awarding two championships per season, placing eighth with 25 points at the end of the first stage, and in the 2010 Finalización they also managed to reach the semi-finals, being managed by Fernando "Pecoso" Castro.

Deportes Quindío were relegated to Primera B for the second time at the end of the 2013 Categoría Primera A season despite winning their last game against Boyacá Chicó, after they ended in bottom place of the relegation table with 114 points, one point behind Cúcuta Deportivo, who defeated Atlético Nacional and qualified for the relegation play-off. They had a chance to make an immediate return to the top flight like in 2001, by winning the 2014 Finalización and playing the season's grand final against Jaguares de Córdoba, which they lost by a 3–2 score on aggregate. This defeat qualified Quindío for the promotion play-off, where they had one last chance to earn promotion but they eventually lost to Uniautónoma. The following year, Deportes Quindío took part in a special tournament made to expand the Primera A tournament to 20 teams, in which they narrowly missed out on promotion after drawing with Cúcuta Deportivo with a controversial goal scored by Marco Lazaga, while in 2016, they were once again left at the doors of promotion, losing a crucial match to América de Cali on the final semi-finals matchday when they just needed a draw to clinch promotion.

Deportes Quindío stayed in Primera B until the 2021 season, when they won the Apertura tournament by beating Cortuluá in the double-legged final and advanced to play the grand final against Atlético Huila, winners of the 2020 tournament. Although they ended up losing the grand final to Huila by a 3–1 aggregate score, they were promoted after ending up on top of the aggregate table of the 2020 and 2021–I tournaments. However, their stay in Primera A was short-lived, being relegated back to the second tier after just five months with a 3–0 defeat at home against Patriotas, who were the team's main rivals in the relegation table of the 2021 Primera A tournament.

== Honours ==
=== Domestic ===
- Categoría Primera A
  - Winners (1): 1956
- Categoría Primera B
  - Winners (1): 2001

== Performance in CONMEBOL competitions ==
- Copa CONMEBOL: 2 appearances

1998: Quarter-finals
1999: First Round

== Current squad ==
As of 16 August 2026

Note: Flags indicate national team as defined under FIFA eligibility rules; some limited exceptions apply. Players may hold more than one non-FIFA nationality.

No.	Pos.	Nation	Player
1	GK	COL	Mauricio Jiménez
2	DF	COL	Uberney Rovira
3	DF	COL	Mauricio Castaño
4	MF	COL	Hermen Landázuri
5	DF	COL	Santiago Roa
6	MF	COL	Santiago Orozco
7	FW	COL	José Lloreda
8	MF	COL	Fredy Valencia
9	FW	COL	Miller Bacca
10	MF	COL	Javier Reina
12	GK	COL	Sergio Pabón
14	DF	COL	Luis Morán
15	DF	COL	Félix Mosquera
16	MF	COL	Yosimarc Torres

No.	Pos.	Nation	Player
17	FW	COL	Jhonier Viveros
18	MF	COL	Juan Sebastián Ramírez
19	DF	COL	Jaminson Sandoval
20	FW	COL	Juan Esteban Ocampo
21	MF	COL	Alejandro Álvarez
22	DF	COL	Martín Payares
23	MF	COL	Andrés Tello
24	FW	COL	Juan Ibargüen
25	FW	COL	Andrés Carabalí
26	DF	COL	Kevin Hurtado
27	DF	COL	Yosimarc Torres
29	FW	COL	Ronald Angulo
30	GK	PAR	Joel Silva

== Managers ==
- (Argentina) Julio Tocker (1956)
- (Argentina) José Lombardo (1956)
- (Colombia) Efraín Sánchez (1966)
- (Argentina) Norberto Bautista (1987)
- (Colombia) Fernando Castro (1987)
- (Colombia) Fernando Castro (1989)
- (Colombia) Álvaro de Jesús Gómez (1990)
- (Colombia) Luis Augusto García (1991)
- (Colombia) Arturo Boyacá (1995–1996)
- (Argentina) Óscar Quintabani (1996–1997)
- (Colombia) Carlos Restrepo Isaza (1999)
- (Colombia) Eduardo Lara (2001–2002)
- (Colombia) Jaime Rodríguez (2002)
- (Colombia) Walter Aristizábal (2003–2004)
- (Colombia) Diego Umaña (March 2004 – June 2005)
- (Colombia) Diego Barragán (June 2005 – December 2005)
- (Colombia) Diego Umaña (January 2006 – April 2007)
- (Colombia) Néstor Otero (December 2007 – October 2009)
- (Colombia) Wilman Conde (October 2009 – December 2010)
- (Colombia) Fernando Castro (January 2011 – December 2012)
- (Colombia) Eduardo Cruz (January 2013 – May 2013)
- (Colombia) César Torres (May 2013 – June 2013)
- (Colombia) Arturo Boyacá (July 2013 – September 2013)
- (Colombia) César Torres (September 2013 – November 2013)
- (Colombia) Miguel Augusto Prince (January 2014 – December 2015)
- (Colombia) José Eugenio Hernández (January 2016 – December 2016)
- (Colombia) Alberto Suárez (January 2017 – December 2019)
- (Argentina) Óscar Quintabani (December 2019 – October 2023)
- (Colombia) Rubén Darío Hernández (October 2023 – December 2024)
- (Colombia) Carlos Eduardo Velasco (December 2024 – April 2025)
- (Colombia) Rubén Darío Hernández (April 2025)
- (Colombia) Diego Rojas (April 2025)
- (Colombia) Harold Rivera (April 2025 – Present)

== Affiliated teams ==
- (Colombia) Boca Juniors de Cali
