= Huracán de Medellín =

- Full name: Huracán Fútbol Club de Medellín
- Nickname(s): El Globo (The Balloon)
- Founded: 1 May 1949
- Dissolved: 1951; 74 years ago
- Ground: Estadio San Fernando; Itagüí, Colombia
- League: Campeonato Profesional
Home colours

Huracán Fútbol Club de Medellín was a Colombian football club which spent three seasons in the Campeonato Profesional, the top-tier league of Colombian football. The club was formed on 1 May 1949.

Huracán was the third football club from Medellín, competing for fan sympathies with Atlético Nacional and Independiente Medellín, the other two clubs from the city. They entered the 1949 Campeonato Profesional, in which they suffered several thrashings including a 10–2 defeat to Santa Fe and a 7–2 loss to Deportivo Barranquilla, conceding 75 goals in 26 matches. In the 1950 competition, they played the match with the highest scoring draw in the competition's history, drawing with América de Cali by a 6–6 score. Eventually, Huracán conceded 96 goals in the 30 matches of that season.

In the 1951 tournament, Huracán were beaten 9–0 by Deportivo Pereira and 8–0 by Santa Fe, finishing the league in last place with only two wins and 93 goals against in 34 matches. The club withdrew from the league and folded at the end of that year due to its poor performances as well as serious financial problems. During their three-year stay in the professional league, Huracán played 90 matches with 16 wins, 16 draws and 58 losses.
