= Alcides Mañay =

Uruguayan footballer (born 1927)

Personal information
- Full name: Alcides Javier Mañay Castro
- Date of birth: 18 January 1927
- Place of birth: Montevideo, Uruguay
- Position: Midfielder

Senior career*
Years	Team	Apps	(Gls)
1945–1947	Defensor Sporting		
1950–1953	Cúcuta Deportivo		
1953–1955	AS Cannes		

International career
1945	Uruguay	1	(0)
- * Club domestic league appearances and goals

Alcides Javier Mañay Castro (born 18 January 1927) was a Uruguayan footballer. He played in one match for the Uruguay national football team in 1945. He was also part of Uruguay's squad for the 1946 South American Championship.
