= Dragan Miranović =

Serbian and Montenegrin football manager and player

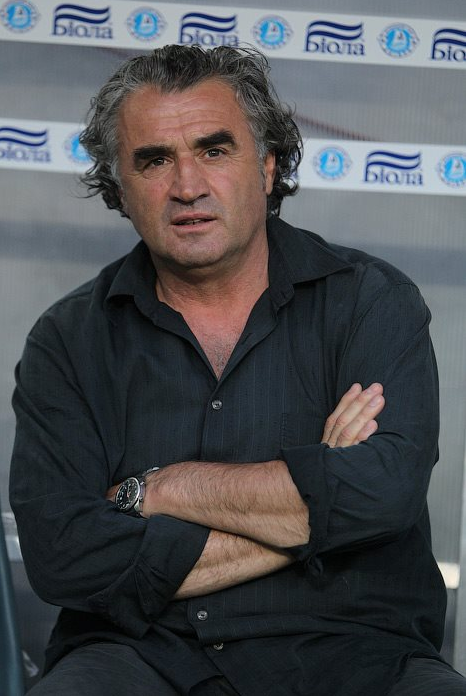
- Miranović in 2010

Personal information
- Full name: Dragan Miranović
- Date of birth: 18 May 1956
- Place of birth: Feketić, PR Serbia, FPR Yugoslavia
- Date of death: 19 March 2012 (aged 55)
- Place of death: Quito, Ecuador
- Position: Midfielder

Youth career
- Jadran Feketić
- Vojvodina

Senior career*
Years	Team	Apps	(Gls)
1975–1976	Slavija Novi Sad		
1976–1987	Spartak Subotica	191	(35)
1987–1988	SV Spittal/Drau	22	(2)
1991–1992	Valdez		

Managerial career
- 1992: Deportivo Quito
- 1993–1995: Peru U17
- 1993–1995: Peru U20
- 1995–1996: Bolivia (assistant)
- 1999–2000: El Nacional
- 2001: Barcelona SC
- 2001: Olmedo
- 2002: Independiente Santa Fe
- 2003: Atlético Junior
- 2003: El Nacional
- 2004: Olmedo
- 2004–2005: Millonarios
- 2005: Aucas
- 2006: Deportivo Cuenca
- 2006: Atlético Junior
- 2006–2007: Deportivo Quito
- 2008–2009: Olmedo
- 2010: Aucas
- 2010: Spartak Subotica
- 2011: Olmedo
- * Club domestic league appearances and goals

Dragan Miranović (Serbian Cyrillic: Драган Мирановић; 18 May 1956 – 19 March 2012) was a Serbian and Montenegrin football manager and player.

== Playing career ==
Born in Feketić, Miranović started playing football in his hometown, before joining Vojvodina's youth system. He later went on to spend 11 seasons with Spartak Subotica, making his Yugoslav First League debut in the 1986–87 campaign, before going abroad. After his stint at SV Spittal/Drau in Austria, Miranović moved to Ecuador and played for Valdez in the Copa Libertadores, before retiring from the game.

== Managerial career ==
During his managerial career, Miranović worked at numerous South American clubs, including Olmedo (four times), Deportivo Quito, El Nacional, Atlético Junior and Aucas (each twice), as well as Barcelona SC, Independiente Santa Fe, Millonarios and Deportivo Cuenca. He also led Peru at the 1995 South American U-20 Championship.

== Death ==
On 19 March 2012, Miranović died in Quito of a heart attack at the age of 55. A number of his former players expressed their sympathy and condolences to the family and friends, including Antonio Valencia and Claudio Pizarro.

== Managerial statistics ==
Managerial record by team and tenure
Team	From	To	Record				
Team	From	To	P	W	D	L	Win %
El Nacional	1999	2000					
Barcelona SC	February 2001	May 2001					
Olmedo	2001	2001					
Independiente Santa Fe	December 2001	November 2002					
Atlético Junior	December 2002	June 2003					
El Nacional	June 2003	December 2003					
Olmedo	March 2004	August 2004					
Millonarios	September 2004	March 2005					
Aucas	June 2005	December 2005					
Deportivo Cuenca	March 2006	May 2006					
Atlético Junior	May 2006	October 2006					
Deportivo Quito	November 2006	June 2007					
Olmedo	July 2008	May 2009					
Aucas	February 2010	May 2010					
Spartak Subotica	May 2010	November 2010	19	8	6	5	42.11
Olmedo	December 2010	December 2011					
Total							

== Honours ==
Spartak Subotica

- Yugoslav Second League: 1985–86
