= Néstor Otero =

Colombian football manager

Personal information
- Full name: Néstor William Otero Carvajal
- Date of birth: 18 September 1955 (age 71)
- Place of birth: Cali, Colombia

Managerial career
- Years: Team
- 1999–2001: Deportes Tolima
- 2001–2002: Deportivo Cali
- 2002–2004: Deportivo Pasto
- 2004–2005: Deportivo Pereira
- 2005–2006: Deportivo Pasto
- 2006: Real Cartagena
- 2006–2007: Atlético Huila
- 2007–2008: Deportivo Cali
- 2008–2009: Deportes Quindío
- 2009–2010: Cúcuta Deportivo
- 2010–2011: Independiente Santa Fe
- 2011–2012: Atlético Huila
- 2012–2014: La Equidad
- 2015–2016: Águilas Doradas
- 2016–2017: Águilas Doradas
- 2017: Cortuluá
- 2020: Deportivo Llacuabamba

Néstor William Otero Carvajal (born 18 September 1955) is a Colombian football manager.

== Career ==
Born in Cali, Otero studied mathematics at Universidad Santiago de Cali, earning him the nickname Matemático. Otero began his football coaching career with Deportes Tolima in 1999. In eighteen years managing Colombian professional football clubs, Otero has worked for a total of twelve teams (including two spells each at Deportivo Cali and Deportivo Pasto).

Otero has led two clubs to runner's-up finishes in the Categoría Primera A (Pasto in 2002 and Atlético Huila in 2007).
