= Germán González (footballer, born 1952) =

Colombian football manager (born 1952)

Personal information
- Full name: Germán González García
- Date of birth: 26 January 1952 (age 74)
- Place of birth: Bogotá, Colombia
- Position: Central defender

Senior career*
Years	Team	Apps	(Gls)
1968–1980	Independiente Santa Fe		

Managerial career
- 1991: Deportes Tolima
- 2005–2006: Independiente Santa Fe
- 2009–2010: Independiente Santa Fe
- 2010–2012: Deportivo Lara
- 2012: Real Cartagena
- 2016: Llaneros
- * Club domestic league appearances and goals

Germán González García (born 26 January 1952) is a Colombian football manager.

== Career ==
Born in Bogotá, González joined local side Santa Fe at age 16, where he played as a central defender, and won the 1975 Campeonato Profesional championship with Santa Fe. As a manager, he led Santa Fe to the 2009 Copa Colombia title.

After he retired from playing football, González studied business administration, but did not complete his degree. Instead, he began coaching youth football, eventually leading Santa Fe's under-23 side. After success with Santa Fe's youth side, he was appointed technical director of Deportes Tolima in 1991, his first professional football management position.
