= Once Caldas =

Association football club in Colombia

- Full name: Once Caldas S.A.
- Nicknames: El Blanco (The White); El Blanco Blanco de Manizales (Manizales's White-White); Los Albos (the Albos); El Equipo Albo (The Albo Team)
- Founded: 16 April 1947 (Foundation of Deportes Caldas); 15 January 1961; 65 years ago (Merger with Once Deportivo)
- Ground: Palogrande
- Capacity: 32,000
- President: Daniel Jaramillo
- Head coach: Carlos Valencia (caretaker)
- League: Categoría Primera A
- 2025: Primera A, 9th of 20
- Website: www.oncecaldas.com.co
Home colours	Away colours

Once Caldas S.A., simply known as Once Caldas, is a professional Colombian football team based in Manizales, that currently plays in the Categoría Primera A. The club plays its home games at Estadio Palogrande.

The club was founded in 1961 after the merger of Deportes Caldas and Deportivo Manizales (also known as Once Deportivo).

The club has won the Categoría Primera A four times, but is mainly known for its 2004 Copa Libertadores title.

== History ==
Although the current Once Caldas ("Caldas Eleven") was founded in 1961 from the merger of Deportes Caldas and Once Deportivo, both were founding clubs of the Campeonato Profesional, as the Colombian professional football league was originally named, and both took part in the first edition held in 1948. Founded in 1930, Once Deportivo was the club's oldest predecessor, but did not enjoy much success in its participations in the football league: in 1948 it placed ninth out of 10 teams, ninth as well in 1949 but with 14 teams, second-from-bottom with 16 teams in 1950, and ninth again in its final season in 1951. Meanwhile, Deportes Caldas (founded in 1947), were more successful in the competition. They placed third in the first edition of the league, and two years later they won their first league title with Alfredo Cuezzo as manager, playing 30 matches, winning 20, drawing 5, and losing 5, scoring 91 goals and conceding 48. In the 1951 Colombian championship, which would also be Deportes Caldas's final participation in the tournament, the team finished tenth out of 18 teams.

Both Deportes Caldas and Once Deportivo went defunct after the 1951 season and were replaced intermittently in later seasons by another team called Atlético Manizales, which for its first season in 1952 was formed with players from both sides, however, plans to revive either of the original clubs started being discussed. Carlos Gómez Escobar was in favor of reviving Deportes Caldas, but Eduardo Gómez Arrubla's idea was to bring back Once Deportivo. Thanks to the mediation of Dr. Hermán Bueno Ramírez, the three co-founders reached a compromise to merge the previous clubs into a new entity named Once Caldas. The merged club joined the league ahead of the 1961 season under the license that formerly belonged to Deportes Caldas, and played its first match on 12 March 1961, a 3–2 loss to Deportivo Pereira. In that year, the club finished seventh in the league table.

Due to financial reasons, in 1972 Once Caldas became the first Colombian club to showcase a sponsor on its shirt, and starting from that year it lent its name to the different sponsors it had during that period, changing its name to Cristal Caldas in 1972, Varta Caldas in 1979, back to Cristal Caldas four years later and finally Once Philips in 1991. The club dropped the practice of adopting its sponsor's name in 1993, reverting to its original name.

The club had a good campaign in 1983. The season was divided into two tournaments, Copa de La Paz (Apertura) and Torneo Nacional (Finalización). In the Copa de La Paz, the club finished first in their group with 20 points, which automatically qualified them for the final octagonal held at the end of the year to decide the season's champion; in that tournament, Once Caldas finished fifth with 14 points. Ten years later Once Caldas won the Apertura tournament, defeating Junior in the final, but failed to make it to the final stage as they were eliminated in the semifinals.

In the 1997 Adecuación tournament, Once Caldas finished in second place of their semifinal group and advanced to the third place play-off where they faced Millonarios. Although they lost on bonus points after each team won one match in the series, Once Caldas were awarded a spot in the 1998 Copa CONMEBOL since Millonarios declined to participate in order to enter the 1998 Copa Merconorte. The Copa CONMEBOL was Once Caldas's first participation in an international competition, in which the club was eliminated in the first round by the eventual winners Santos. Santos won the first leg in Brazil 2–1, and in the second leg in Manizales, Once Caldas won 2–1 but was defeated 3–2 in the penalty shootout.

In 1998, Once Caldas had a great season. They topped the Torneo Apertura with 77 points as well as the Finalización, and went on to win their semifinal group to set up a final with Deportivo Cali, in which Caldas were heavy favorites. However, they had a poor performance in the first leg and suffered one of their heaviest defeats of the season, losing 4–0 in the first leg in Cali. In the second leg at home, the match ended in a scoreless draw and Caldas finished as runner-up.

Once Caldas participated in the Copa Libertadores for the first time in 1999, with their group consisting of Deportivo Cali, Vélez Sársfield and River Plate. The club's first match was on 24 February 1999, a 1–0 loss to Deportivo Cali. Their next match was the club's first win in the competition, a 4–1 home win against River Plate. The side finished last, but only two points behind Vélez Sarsfield who ended up winning the group.

In the 2001 season, the club finished third in the Apertura, and first in the Finalización, and was the best team in the aggregate table. Going into the semifinals, the club was a heavy favorite for the title. Once Caldas went into the final match of that stage only needing a win against América de Cali to qualify for the finals; however, the match ended 2–2 and the club missed out on the finals. The club's aggregate table position granted it a berth into the 2002 Copa Libertadores, where the club finished third in its group and was eliminated.

In June 2003, the club won the Apertura title, 53 years after their last title, beating Junior in the finals 1–0 on aggregate. The 2003 title granted the club a berth in the 2004 Copa Libertadores. In the group stage of that Copa Libertadores, Once Caldas topped Group 2 which also featured Vélez Sarsfield, Uruguayan side Fénix, and Unión Atlético Maracaibo from Venezuela. After an outstanding campaign in the knockout rounds in which Once Caldas successively eliminated Ecuadorian side Barcelona as well as the previous season's finalists Santos and two-time champions São Paulo, Once Caldas reached the finals where they were paired up with five-time champions Boca Juniors. The first leg in La Bombonera ended in a 0–0 draw. In the second leg in Manizales, Once Caldas took the lead with a goal by Jhon Viáfara but Nicolás Burdisso leveled the score in the second half to send the match into a penalty shootout which was won by the club 2–0, and Once Caldas, managed by Luis Fernando Montoya, won the competition for the first time ever, becoming the second Colombian team after Atlético Nacional to win the Copa Libertadores.

2004 Libertadores Lineup

In 2004 league play, Once Caldas finished third in the first stage of the Apertura and seventh in the first stage of the Finalización, making it to the semifinals in both campaigns, but were not able to make it to the finals; in the Apertura the club was just one point away from making the finals. As the Copa Libertadores champions, the club played the 2004 Intercontinental Cup against the UEFA Champions League champions Porto at the end of the year. After a 0–0 draw, Once Caldas were defeated 8–7 in the penalty shootout.

In 2005, as the previous year's champion, Once Caldas tried to defend its title in the Copa Libertadores, but were eliminated by Tigres UANL in the round of 16. That year the club also participated in the Recopa Sudamericana, which was a rematch against Boca Juniors who had won the Copa Sudamericana the previous year. Once Caldas ended up as runners-up after losing 4–3 on aggregate score following a 3–1 defeat in the first leg played in Buenos Aires and a 2–1 victory in the second leg at home.

Once Caldas would go on to find sporadic success throughout the following years, qualifying for the semifinals in the 2005 Finalización, 2006 Apertura and 2007 Finalización. In 2008, the club reached the finals of the Copa Colombia, losing to La Equidad. In the 2009 Apertura, Once Caldas reached the finals in which they once again faced Junior. Once Caldas won the title by an aggregate score of 5–2, winning both legs of the series: 2–1 in Manizales and 3–1 in Barranquilla. In the 2010 Finalización championship, Once Caldas played the finals against Deportes Tolima, winning their fourth league title after defeating Tolima by a 3–1 aggregate score. A year later, Once Caldas ended up as runners-up of the 2011 Finalización championship to Junior, losing on penalties in Manizales. In 2012, following financial turmoil, American truck manufacturer Kenworth acquired an 80% share of the club.

Following the Kenworth takeover, the team qualified for the final stages of both the Apertura and Finalización championships during the 2013 and 2014 seasons. From then on, it only made it out of the first stage in the 2015 Finalización, and both tournaments of the 2018 season. In 2018, the club also finished runner-up in the Copa Colombia to Atlético Nacional. The following year they took part in the Copa Sudamericana for the first time, losing to Paraguayan side Deportivo Santaní in the first round.

Starting from 2019, Once Caldas would not reach the final stages of the league tournament for six years and became heavily involved in relegation contention as a result of the poor campaigns in these seasons, but the club's poor streak ended with the return of club legend Dayro Moreno, since his goalscoring helped the club advance to the semifinal stage of the 2024 Apertura, after placing eighth with 29 points in the first stage before being knocked out; in the Finalización tournament the club also reached the semifinals following a seventh place finish in the regular phase but missed out on the tournament finals after losing their last semifinal match.

== Uniform ==
In early 2005, Once Caldas decided to leave behind the brand Bogota FSS and go to the German brand Adidas. After concluding its contract with Adidas, Once Caldas switches to Peruvian company Walon Sport, since the 2008 season. until 2016 where they left Walon Sport for Errea. In the 2019 season Once Caldas left Errea to dress the local brand Sheffy. In the 2023 season, they left Sheffy and joined local brand Hillside.

- Home: White shirt, white shorts and white socks.
- Away: Black shirt, black shorts and black socks.

== Stadium ==
Once Caldas plays its home matches at Estadio Palogrande, located in Manizales and inaugurated in 1936.

== Honours ==
=== Domestic ===
- Categoría Primera A
  - Winners (4): 1950, 2003–I, 2009–I, 2010–II
- Copa Colombia
  - Runners-up (2): 2008, 2018

=== International ===
- Copa Libertadores
  - Winners (1): 2004
- Recopa Sudamericana
  - Runners-up (1): 2005
- Intercontinental Cup
  - Runners-up (1): 2004

== Players ==
=== Current squad ===
As of 24 September 2026

Note: Flags indicate national team as defined under FIFA eligibility rules; some limited exceptions apply. Players may hold more than one non-FIFA nationality.

No.	Pos.	Nation	Player
2	DF	COL	Jorge Cardona
3	DF	COL	Andrés Correa
4	DF	COL	Efraín Navarro
5	MF	COL	Juan Pablo Nieto
7	FW	COL	Michael Barrios
9	FW	COL	Luis Felipe Gómez
12	GK	VEN	Jesús Camargo (on loan from Deportivo Táchira)
14	FW	COL	Jefry Zapata
15	MF	COL	Jaime Alvarado (on loan from Independiente Medellín)
16	DF	COL	Juan Felipe Castaño
17	FW	COL	Dayro Moreno (captain)
18	DF	COL	Jáider Riquett
19	MF	COL	Tomás García
20	MF	COL	Andrés Felipe Roa
21	FW	COL	Helieyker Guzmán

No.	Pos.	Nation	Player
22	DF	COL	Juan Cuesta
23	MF	COL	Andrés Colorado
25	GK	COL	Juan Gallego
27	MF	COL	Kevin Villada
28	MF	COL	Mateo Zuleta
29	FW	COL	Edwin Torres (on loan from Operário Ferroviário)
30	DF	COL	Daniel Londoño (on loan from Independiente Medellín)
31	FW	COL	Jorman Beltrán
33	DF	COL	Juan Patiño (on loan from Nacional)
36	MF	COL	Rafael Acuña
39	DF	COL	Hian Rincón
42	MF	COL	Jader Quiñónes
99	GK	COL	Joan Parra
—	DF	COL	Jhon Pájaro
—	FW	COL	John Deiby Araujo

=== Out on loan ===
Note: Flags indicate national team as defined under FIFA eligibility rules; some limited exceptions apply. Players may hold more than one non-FIFA nationality.

No.	Pos.	Nation	Player
—	GK	COL	James Aguirre (at Millonarios)
—	MF	COL	Esteban Beltrán (at Jaguares de Córdoba)

No.	Pos.	Nation	Player
—	MF	COL	Yeiler Valencia (at Real Cundinamarca)
—	FW	COL	Luis Palacios (at Santa Fe)

=== World Cup players ===
The following players were chosen to represent their country at the FIFA World Cup while contracted to Once Caldas.

- (Colombia) Nestor Ortiz (1994)
- (Colombia) José Fernando Cuadrado (2018)

== Records ==
=== Most appearances ===
Rank	Name	Matches
1	(Colombia) Juan Carlos Henao	605
2	(Colombia) Arnulfo Valentierra	481
3	(Colombia) Robeiro Fernando Moreno	451
4	(Argentina) Sergio Galván Rey	377
5	(Colombia) Rodrigo Gómez	373

=== Top goalscorers ===
As of 26 August 2024

Rank	Name	Goals
1	(Argentina) Sergio Galván Rey	185
2	(Colombia) Arnulfo Valentierra	138
3	(Colombia) Dayro Moreno	128
4	(Argentina) Roberto Mirabelli	66
5	(Colombia) Nicolás Lobatón	59

== Managers ==
- (Argentina) Alfredo Cuezzo (1950–1960)
- (Argentina) José Próspero Fabrini (1961)
- (Argentina) Francisco Villegas (1962–1963)
- (Colombia) Luis Alberto Rubio (1964–1965)
- (Spain) Simón Herrerías (1966–1967)
- (Colombia) Óscar Ramos (1967–1968)
- (Ecuador) Pablo Ansaldo (1970)
- (Argentina) Amadeo Carrizo (1973)
- (Colombia) Gilberto Osorio (1975–1977)
- (Argentina) Eduardo Luján Manera (1978)
- (Argentina) Felipe Ribaudo (1979)
- (Argentina) Carlos Antonietta (1980–1981)
- (Colombia) Efraín Sánchez (1981)
- (Argentina) Juan Carlos Sarnari (1982)
- (Argentina) Américo Pérez (1983)
- (Argentina) Juan Manuel Guerra (1984)
- (Colombia) Jaime Silva (1985)
- (Colombia) Francisco Maturana (1986)
- (Colombia) Diego Umaña (1987)
- (Colombia) Leonel Montoya (1988)
- (Argentina) Carlos Miguel Dizz (1988–1990)
- (Colombia) Moisés Pachón (1990)
- (Argentina) Alfonso Núñez (1990)
- (Colombia) Álvaro de Jesús Gómez (1991)
- (Paraguay) Gerardo González Aquino (1991)
- (Colombia) Víctor Luna (1991)
- (Colombia) Carlos Navarrete (1991)
- (Colombia) Carlos Restrepo (1992–1994)
- (Colombia) Orlando Restrepo (1995–1997)
- (Colombia) Joaquin Castro (1997)
- (Colombia) Javier Álvarez Arteaga (1997–1998)
- (Colombia) Alexis García (1999)
- (Colombia) Juan Eugenio Jiménez (2000)
- (Colombia) Javier Álvarez Arteaga (2001–2002)
- (Colombia) Luis Montoya (January 2003 – December 2004)
- (Colombia) Carlos Alberto Valencia (January 2005 – August 2005)
- (Colombia) Juan Carlos Bedoya (August 2005)
- (Colombia) Jaime de la Pava (September 2005 – December 2005)
- (Colombia) Juan Carlos Bedoya (January 2006 – December 2006)
- (Colombia) Fernando Castro (January 2007 – June 2007)
- (Colombia) Santiago Escobar (June 2007 – November 2007)
- (Colombia) Juan Carlos Bedoya (November 2007 – May 2008)
- (Colombia) Jorge Luis Bernal (May 2008 – November 2008)
- (Colombia) Javier Álvarez Arteaga (November 2008 – November 2009)
- (Colombia) Juan Carlos Osorio (January 2010 – December 2011)
- (Colombia) Luis Pompilio Páez (December 2011 – July 2012)
- (Argentina) Guillermo Ángel Hoyos (July 2012 – December 2012)
- (Colombia) Santiago Escobar (December 2012 – December 2013)
- (Colombia) Flabio Torres (December 2013 – February 2015)
- (Argentina) Javier Torrente (May 2015 – August 2016)
- (Argentina) Hernán Lisi (September 2016 – April 2017)
- (Colombia) Herney Duque (April 2017 – June 2017)
- (Colombia) Francisco Maturana (June 2017 – November 2017)
- (Colombia) Herney Duque (November 2017 – December 2017)
- (Colombia) Hubert Bodhert (December 2017 – December 2018)
- (Colombia) Eduardo Lara (January 2021 – August 2021)
- (Colombia) Diego Corredor (August 2021 – February 2023)
- (Colombia) Elkin Soto (February 2023 – March 2023)
- (Colombia) Pedro Sarmiento (March 2023 – October 2023)
- (Colombia) Hernán Herrera (October 2023 – September 2026)

Source: Worldfootball.net
