= Boca Juniors de Cali =

Association football club in Colombia

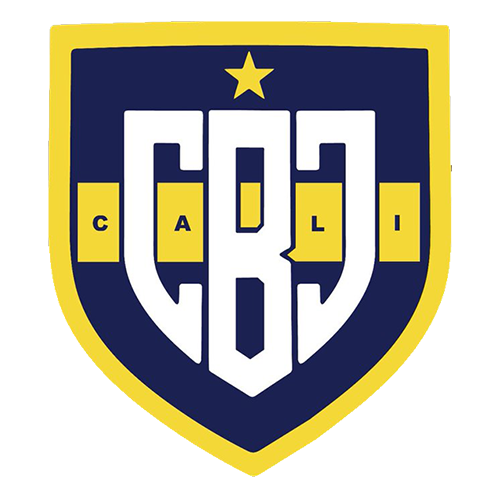
- Full name: Club Deportivo Atlético Boca Juniors de Cali
- Nickname: La Ciencia Boquense
- Founded: 25 September 1937; 89 years ago 12 March 2019; 7 years ago (Refounding)
- Ground: Pascual Guerrero
- Capacity: 38,000
- President: Alexander Otero
- Head coach: José Manuel Rodríguez
- League: Categoría Primera B
- 2025: Primera B, 10th of 16
- Website: www.bocajuniors.com.co
Home colours	Away colours

Boca Juniors de Cali is a professional football club which represented the Colombian city of Cali from its creation in 1937 until its exit from professional football in 1957 and again from 2019 onwards competing in the Categoría Primera B, the second tier of Colombian football. Since its early years it adopted the jersey from Argentine team Boca Juniors.

== History ==
=== Early years ===
Founded on 25 September 1937, and joining the professional league in 1949, Boca Juniors de Cali was one of the most important teams of the El Dorado era, rivalling with clubs such as Millonarios from Bogotá and crosstown rivals América de Cali. Boca Juniors placed as runners-up in the 1951 and 1952 seasons, finishing behind Millonarios in both cases and third in the following season, behind Millonarios and Deportes Quindío. After those three campaigns, and although the team's performance started dwindling, it was able to stabilize in the middle of the table. During this period, the club also won the Copa Colombia in the 1950–51 and 1951–52 seasons. In the 1952–53 season, they finished as runners-up in that competition, once again behind Millonarios.

In 1958, Boca Juniors de Cali did not take part in the professional league. The club suffered the economic crisis that engulfed several Colombian clubs after El Dorado, and the lack of sponsorships, fanbase, and income caused the club to withdraw, leading to its disbanding and making way for the return of Deportivo Cali, who bought their membership in the professional league and along with América went on to become the city's most representative clubs.

=== Refounding and return to professional football ===
In 1987, a group of football executives led by Hernando Ángel refounded Boca Juniors as an amateur club and football academy taking part in the tournaments of the Valle del Cauca regional league. It has also participated in the youth tournaments organized by the FCF and has built an important reputation due to its success in different tournaments and the number of players it promotes to professional football. Several well-known players such as Giovanni Hernández, Wilman Conde, Hugo Rodallega and others have emerged from its ranks. Owing to Ángel also owning both Deportes Quindío and Universitario Popayán, the latter clubs became a platform for the Boca Juniors players to access professional football, being first promoted to Universitario and then to Deportes Quindío.

On 12 March 2019, the General Assembly of Dimayor approved a proposal to relocate Universitario Popayán from Popayán to Cali starting from the second half of the 2019 season, with the aforementioned club being rebranded as Boca Juniors. This move allowed the return of Boca Juniors to professional football after 61 years.

== Players ==
=== Current squad ===
As of 24 September 2026

Note: Flags indicate national team as defined under FIFA eligibility rules; some limited exceptions apply. Players may hold more than one non-FIFA nationality.

No.	Pos.	Nation	Player
1	GK	COL	Santiago Hoyos
2	DF	COL	Juan Montaño
3	DF	COL	Kevin Hurtado
4	DF	COL	Santiago Llanos
5	MF	COL	Hermes Angulo
6	DF	COL	Luis Pérez
7	MF	COL	Juan Camilo Cuero
8	MF	COL	Wilmar Arango
10	MF	COL	Michael Aponzá
11	DF	COL	Didier Beitar
12	GK	COL	Euler Obando
13	FW	COL	Francisco Nagles
14	FW	COL	Jhoan Mancilla
15	MF	COL	Junior Urresti

No.	Pos.	Nation	Player
16	MF	COL	Marlon Lucumí
17	MF	COL	José Andrade
18	DF	COL	Heiner Mosquera
19	MF	COL	Camilo Yepes
20	DF	COL	Yasert Andrade
21	FW	COL	Patricio Urrutia
25	FW	COL	Alexander Mancilla
26	DF	COL	Harold Ortiz
27	FW	COL	Juan Salcedo
31	FW	COL	Diego Díaz
34	MF	COL	Deiman Cortés
35	DF	COL	Juan Viveros
—	MF	COL	Juan Arce

== Honours ==
=== Domestic ===
- Categoría Primera A
  - Runners-up (2): 1951, 1952
- Copa Colombia
  - Winners (1): 1950–51

== Managers ==
- (Colombia) Alejandro Guerrero (July 2019 – May 2023)
- (Colombia) José Manuel Rodríguez (May 2023 – present)
