= Estadio Alfonso López Pumarejo =

Soccer stadium in Bogotá, Colombia

Alfonso López Pumarejo
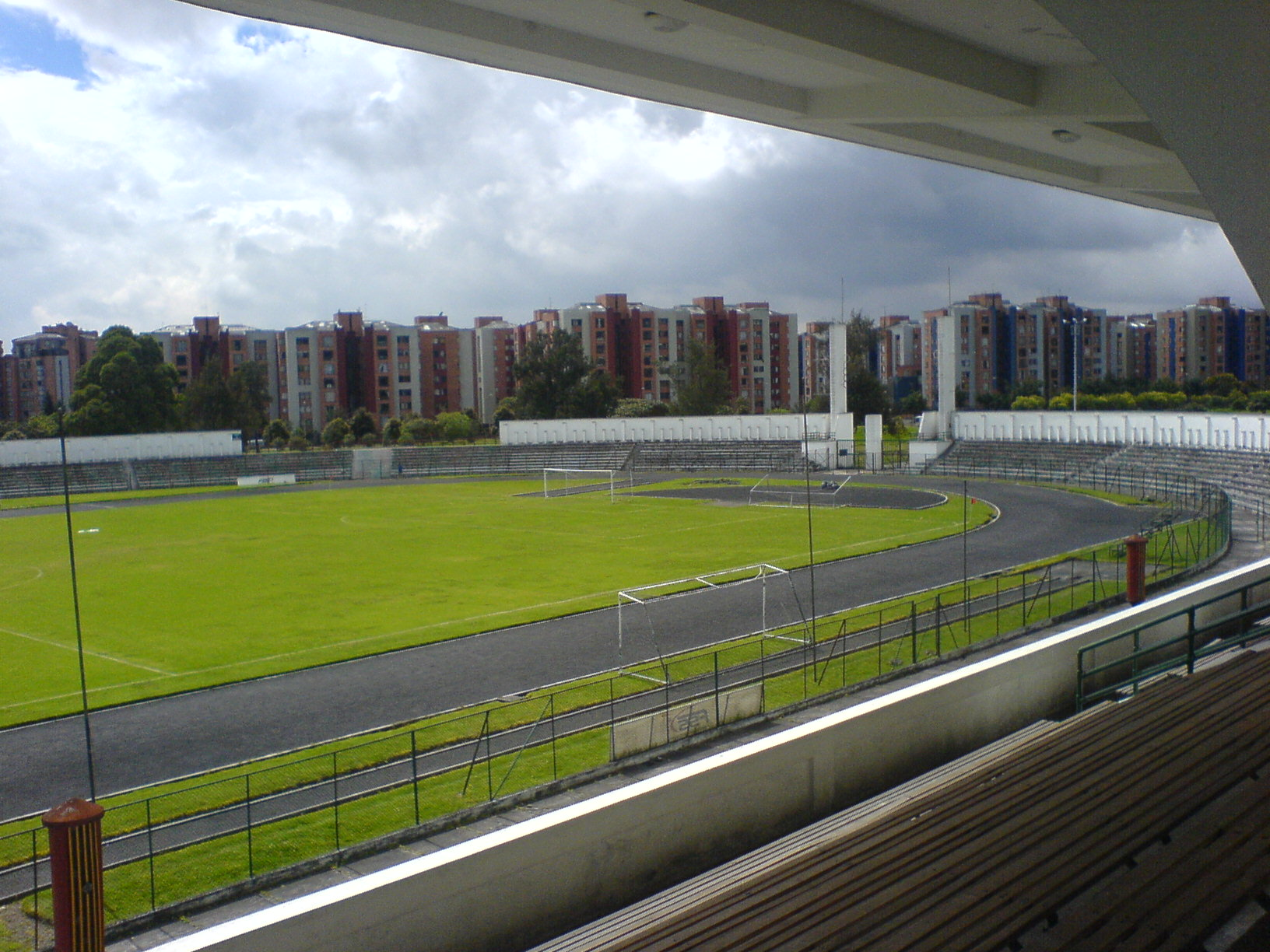
- Interactive map of Alfonso López Pumarejo
- Full name: Estadio Alfonso López Pumarejo de la Ciudad Universitaria
- Location: Bogotá, Colombia
- Coordinates: 4°38′25.28″N 74°5′11.25″W
- Owner: National University of Colombia
- Capacity: 12,000
- Surface: Grass

Construction
- Built: 1938
- Opened: 1938
- Architect: Leopold Rother

Tenants
- Independiente Santa Fe (1948–1951); Universidad (1949–1952); Millonarios (1950); Bogotá Chicó (2003–2004); La Equidad (2007); Bogotá F.C. (2007–2012)

The Alfonso López Pumarejo Stadium is a soccer stadium of National University of Colombia located at University City of Bogotá. It is named after Alfonso López Pumarejo.
