= List of Deportivo Cali managers =

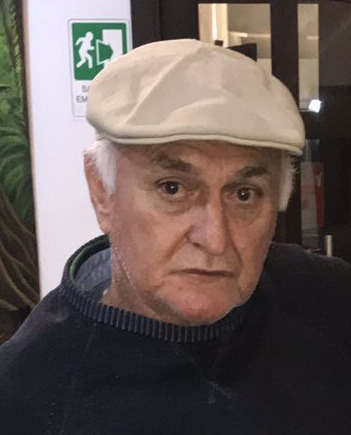
Fernando Castro won two league titles with Deportivo Cali, in the 1995–96 and 2015 Apertura tournaments.

Deportivo Cali is a professional football club based in Cali, Colombia, which plays in Categoría Primera A. This chronological list comprises all those who have held the position of manager of the first team of Deportivo Cali since 1912, the date of the first available data for a club manager. Each manager's entry includes his years of tenure, honours won and significant achievements while under his care, where available. Caretaker managers and player-managers are included, where known. As of 2026, Deportivo Cali has had 57 known full-time managers, 10 caretaker managers, and 5 player-managers.

The first known manager for Deportivo Cali in the professional era was Moisés Emilio Reuben, who arrived to the club as a player in 1947 and was appointed as player-manager shortly after, ahead of the team's first participation in the Colombian football championship in 1948.

The most successful Deportivo Cali manager in terms of trophies won is Francisco "Pancho" Villegas, who won three Categoría Primera A trophies in his first five-year tenure as manager. He is also the club's longest-serving manager, having served for five years between 1965 and 1970 and then again for a brief period in 1976.

== List of managers ==
The complete list of Deportivo Cali managers is shown in the following table:

Italics denote a caretaker manager, ^{PM} denotes a player-manager.

Name	Nationality	From	To	Honours
Francisco Villa Bisa	Spain	1912	1912	
Moisés Emilio Reuben^{PM}	Argentina	1947	1948	
Adelfo Magallanes	Peru	1949	1949	
Carlos Peucelle	Argentina	1950	1950	
Manuel Giúdice^{PM}	Argentina	1950	1951	
Roberto Scarone	Uruguay	1951	1952	
Julio Tocker	Argentina	1953	1953	
Camilo Cervino^{PM}	Argentina	1954	1954	
Pablo Rojas	Colombia	1954	1954	
Santiago Rivas^{PM}	Paraguay	1955	1955	
Julio Tocker	Argentina	1959	1959	
Manuel Sanguinetti^{PM}	Uruguay	1959	1959	
José Fabrini	Argentina	1960	1960	
Carlos Peucelle	Argentina	1961	1961	
Luis López	Argentina	1961	1962	
Gaudencio Thiago de Melo	Brazil	1963	1963	
Óscar Ramos	Colombia	1963	1964	
Francisco Solano Patiño	Paraguay	1964	1964	
Francisco "Pancho" Villegas	Argentina	1965	1970	3 Categoría Primera A
Federico Vairo	Argentina	1966	1966	
Roberto Resquín	Argentina	1970	1971	1 Categoría Primera A
Luis López	Argentina	1971	1971	
Óscar López	Colombia	1971	1972	
Vladislao Cap	Argentina	1972	1973	
Vladimir Popović	Yugoslavia	1974	1974	1 Categoría Primera A
Raúl Rodríguez Seaone	Argentina	1975	1975	
Washington Etchamendi	Uruguay	1976	1976	
Jorge Ramírez Gallego	Colombia	1976	1976	
Néstor Rossi	Argentina	1976	1976	
Francisco "Pancho" Villegas	Argentina	1976	1976	
Carlos Bilardo	Argentina	1976	1978	
Eduardo Luján Manera	Argentina	1979	1980	
Edilberto Righi	Argentina	1980	1981	
Miguel Ángel Basílico	Argentina	1982	1982	
Eduardo Retat	Colombia	1983	1983	
Pedro Nel Ospina	Colombia	1984	1984	
Vladimir Popović	Yugoslavia	1984	1986	
Julio Comesaña	Uruguay	1986	1987	
Óscar Tabárez	Uruguay	1988	1988	
Carlos Portela	Colombia	1988	1988	
Vladimir Popović	Yugoslavia	1989	1989	
Jorge Luis Pinto	Colombia	1990	1991	
Miguel Company	Peru	1991	1992	
Carlos Portela	Colombia	1993	1993	
José Yudica	Argentina	1993	1994	
Fernando Castro	Colombia	1995	1997	1 Categoría Primera A
Reinaldo Rueda	Colombia	1997	1998	
José Eugenio Hernández	Colombia	1998	2000	1 Categoría Primera A
Luis Fernando Suárez	Colombia	2001	2001	
Néstor Otero	Colombia	2001	2001	
Fernando Castro	Colombia	2002	2002	
Óscar Quintabani	Argentina	2002	2003	
Sergio Angulo	Colombia	2003	2003	
Javier Álvarez	Colombia	2003	2003	
Bernardo Redín	Colombia	2004	2004	
Norberto Peluffo	Colombia	2004	2004	
Jaime de la Pava	Colombia	2005	2005	
Pedro Sarmiento	Colombia	2005	2006	1 Categoría Primera A
Omar Labruna	Argentina	2006	2007	
Néstor Otero	Colombia	2007	2007	
Daniel Carreño	Uruguay	2008	2008	
Ricardo Martínez	Colombia	2008	2008	
José Eugenio Hernández	Colombia	2009	2009	
Jorge Luis Bernal	Colombia	2010	2010	
Jorge Cruz	Colombia	2010	2010	
Jaime de la Pava	Colombia	2010	2011	1 Copa Colombia
Jorge Cruz	Colombia	2011	2011	
Jairo Arboleda	Colombia	2011	2011	
Rubén Darío Insúa	Argentina	2011	2012	
Julio Comesaña	Uruguay	2012	2012	
Héctor Cárdenas	Colombia	2012	2012	
Leonel Álvarez	Colombia	2013	2014	1 Superliga Colombiana
Héctor Cárdenas	Colombia	2014	2014	
Fernando Castro	Colombia	2015	2016	1 Categoría Primera A
Mario Yepes	Colombia	2016	2017	
Héctor Cárdenas	Colombia	2017	2017	
Sergio Angulo	Colombia	2017	2017	
Gerardo Pelusso	Uruguay	2018	2018	
Lucas Pusineri	Argentina	2019	2019	
Alfredo Arias	Uruguay	2020	2021	
Ítalo Cervino	Colombia	2021	2021	
Rafael Dudamel	Venezuela	2021	2022	1 Categoría Primera A
Ítalo Cervino	Colombia	2022	2022	
Mayer Candelo	Colombia	2022	2022	
Sergio Angulo	Colombia	2022	2022	
Jorge Luis Pinto	Colombia	2022	2023	
Sergio Herrera	Colombia	2023	2023	
Jaime de la Pava	Colombia	2023	2024	
Hernando Patiño	Colombia	2024	2024	
Hernán Torres	Colombia	2024	2024	
Sergio Herrera	Colombia	2024	2024	
Alfredo Arias	Uruguay	2025	2025	
Sergio Herrera	Colombia	2025	2025	
Alberto Gamero	Colombia	2025	2026	
Rafael Dudamel	Venezuela	2026		
