= 1995 Categoría Primera A season =

Copa Mustang
- Season: 1995
- Dates: 26 February – 14 June 1995
- Champions: Junior (4th title)
- Relegated: Cúcuta Deportivo
- Copa Libertadores: Junior; América de Cali
- Matches: 240
- Goals: 676 (2.82 per match)
- Top goalscorer: Iván Valenciano (25 goals)

The 1995 Categoría Primera A season, known as the 1995 Copa Mustang for sponsoring purposes, was the forty-eighth season of Colombia's top-flight football league. The tournament was also known as Torneo Nivelación given that a switch to the European calendar (from the Northern Hemisphere's fall to spring) was approved starting from the following edition of the competition (the 1995–96 tournament).

Junior won the league for the fourth time, clinching the title on the final day of the season despite losing 3–1 to Santa Fe.

== Format ==
Given the transition from the American calendar to the European one scheduled for the second half of 1995, in this season the 16 participating teams played each other on a double round-robin tournament, with the champion being the team topping the table after the tournament's 30 rounds. The champion and runner-up qualified for the 1996 Copa Libertadores, while the bottom-placed team was relegated to Categoría Primera B. This was the last season in which relegation was decided by the season's standings, changing to a system by average starting from the following season, as well as the first season in which teams were awarded three points for a win.

== Teams ==
16 teams competed in the season, the top 15 teams from the 1994 Primera A championship along with the 1994 Primera B champions Deportes Tolima, who replaced Atlético Bucaramanga who were relegated at the end of the previous season.

Locations of the 1995 Categoría Primera A teams

| Team | City | Stadium |
|---|---|---|
| América de Cali | Cali | Pascual Guerrero |
| Atlético Huila | Neiva | Guillermo Plazas Alcid |
| Atlético Nacional | Medellín | Atanasio Girardot |
| Cortuluá | Tuluá | Doce de Octubre |
| Cúcuta Deportivo | Cúcuta | General Santander |
| Deportes Quindío | Armenia | Centenario |
| Deportes Tolima | Ibagué | Manuel Murillo Toro |
| Deportivo Cali | Cali | Pascual Guerrero |
| Deportivo Pereira | Pereira | Hernán Ramírez Villegas |
| Envigado | Envigado | Polideportivo Sur |
| Independiente Medellín | Medellín | Atanasio Girardot |
| Junior | Barranquilla | Metropolitano Roberto Meléndez |
| Millonarios | Bogotá | El Campín |
| Once Caldas | Manizales | Palogrande |
| Santa Fe | Bogotá | El Campín |
| Unión Magdalena | Santa Marta | Eduardo Santos |

== Standings ==
| Pos | Team | Pld | W | D | L | GF | GA | GD | Pts | Qualification or relegation |
|---|---|---|---|---|---|---|---|---|---|---|
| 1 | Junior (C) | 30 | 18 | 8 | 4 | 66 | 37 | +29 | 62 | Qualification for the Copa Libertadores |
| 2 | América de Cali | 30 | 17 | 9 | 4 | 56 | 32 | +24 | 60 | Qualification for the Copa Libertadores |
| 3 | Atlético Nacional | 30 | 12 | 12 | 6 | 48 | 37 | +11 | 48 | |
| 4 | Deportivo Cali | 30 | 11 | 14 | 5 | 54 | 42 | +12 | 47 | |
| 5 | Santa Fe | 30 | 11 | 12 | 7 | 40 | 29 | +11 | 45 | |
| 6 | Deportivo Pereira | 30 | 13 | 4 | 13 | 52 | 46 | +6 | 43 | |
| 7 | Independiente Medellín | 30 | 11 | 10 | 9 | 48 | 43 | +5 | 43 | |
| 8 | Once Caldas | 30 | 11 | 9 | 10 | 37 | 33 | +4 | 42 | |
| 9 | Deportes Tolima | 30 | 10 | 10 | 10 | 41 | 44 | −3 | 40 | |
| 10 | Deportes Quindío | 30 | 9 | 10 | 11 | 35 | 40 | −5 | 37 | |
| 11 | Cortuluá (Note: Cortuluá were deducted two points.) | 30 | 10 | 7 | 13 | 38 | 45 | −7 | 35 | |
| 12 | Envigado | 30 | 8 | 8 | 14 | 36 | 50 | −14 | 32 | |
| 13 | Unión Magdalena | 30 | 8 | 7 | 15 | 26 | 42 | −16 | 31 | |
| 14 | Millonarios | 30 | 5 | 13 | 12 | 40 | 53 | −13 | 28 | |
| 15 | Atlético Huila | 30 | 6 | 8 | 16 | 34 | 56 | −22 | 26 | |
| 16 | Cúcuta Deportivo (R) | 30 | 5 | 9 | 16 | 25 | 47 | −22 | 24 | Relegation to Categoría Primera B |

Source: RSSSF
Rules for classification: 1) Points, 2) Wins, 3) Goal difference, 4) Goals for, 5) Away goals for, 6) Goals against, 7) Away goals against, 8) Drawing of lots.
(C) Champions; (R) Relegated

== Top goalscorers ==
| Rank | Player | Club | Goals |
|---|---|---|---|
| 1 | (Colombia) Iván Valenciano | Junior | 25 |
| 2 | (Colombia) Níver Arboleda | Deportivo Cali | 19 |
| 3 | (Chile) Cristián Montecinos | Junior | 16 |
| 4 | (Colombia) Carlos Castro | Independiente Medellín | 15 |
| 5 | (Colombia) Rubén Darío Hernández | Santa Fe | 13 |
| 6 | (Uruguay) Rubén Daniel Iturburo | Unión Magdalena | 12 |
| 6 | (Colombia) Edison Mafla | Deportivo Cali | 12 |
| 8 | (Colombia) Henry Zambrano | América de Cali | 11 |
| 9 | (Colombia) Guillermo Castrillón | Envigado | 10 |
| 9 | (Colombia) Alex Comas | América de Cali | 10 |

Source: Historia del Fútbol Profesional Colombiano 70 Años
