= 1995–96 Categoría Primera A season =

Categoría Primera A season

Copa Mustang
- Season: 1995–96
- Dates: 20 August 1995 – 14 July 1996
- Champions: Deportivo Cali (6th title)
- Relegated: Atlético Huila
- 1997 Copa Libertadores: Deportivo Cali; Millonarios
- 1996 Copa CONMEBOL: Deportes Tolima; Santa Fe
- Matches: 420
- Goals: 1,129 (2.69 per match)
- Top goalscorer: Iván Valenciano (36 goals)

The 1995–96 Categoría Primera A season, known as Copa Mustang 1995–96 for sponsoring purposes, was the 49th season of the Categoría Primera A, Colombia's top-flight football league. The season started on 20 August 1995 and ended on 14 July 1996, being the first one played under the European format (from the Northern Hemisphere's fall to spring) following the format change approved in 1994. Deportivo Cali were the champions, winning their sixth domestic league title and first in 22 years with a scoreless draw against crosstown rivals América de Cali on the final day of the season.

Junior were the defending champions, but their title defense was ended at the semi-finals after placing last in their group.

== Format ==
The season was split into four stages: the Apertura and Finalización tournaments, the final stage, and the Liguilla Pre-CONMEBOL:

- In the Apertura tournament, played from August to December 1995, the 16 teams were divided into two groups of eight teams each with regional derby rivals being allocated into different groups. Teams played each other in a double round-robin fashion, followed by two rounds of regional derbies and two more extra rounds between the teams occupying the same position in each group. The top four teams at the end of the tournament were awarded bonus points, with the first one receiving 1.50 points, the second 1.00, the third 0.75, and the fourth getting 0.50 points.
- In the Finalización tournament, played from January to June 1996, the participating teams played each other twice in another double round-robin tournament for a total of 30 rounds. The top four teams were again awarded bonus points under the same allocation used for the Apertura, whilst the team topping the season's aggregate table (Reclasificación) was awarded an additional 1.00 bonus.
- For the final stage, teams were divided according to their placements in the aggregate table: the top eight teams advanced to the semi-finals, for which they were divided into two groups of four where they played every of their group rivals twice. Teams would start at zero points, except for the ones that got bonus points earlier in the season, who carried over those points to this stage. The top two teams in each group advanced to the final group, with the team that topped this group being crowned as league champion and qualifying for the 1997 Copa Libertadores along with the runner-up, whilst the team placing third would qualify for the 1996 Copa CONMEBOL and the fourth would advance to the Copa CONMEBOL play-off against the Liguilla Pre-CONMEBOL winner.
- The eight teams that failed to advance to the final stage played the Liguilla Pre-CONMEBOL, which was also divided into two stages and played under the same format as the final stage. The team that topped the Liguilla's final group would play the final group's fourth-placed team for the league's last Copa CONMEBOL berth.

== Teams ==
16 teams competed in the season, the top 15 teams of the 1995 season and the 1995 Primera B champions Atlético Bucaramanga, who replaced the previous season's relegated team Cúcuta Deportivo.

Locations of the 1995–96 Categoría Primera A teams

Team	Home city	Stadium	Capacity
América de Cali	Cali	Pascual Guerrero	45,625
Atlético Bucaramanga	Bucaramanga	Alfonso López	28,000
Atlético Huila	Neiva	Guillermo Plazas Alcid	22,000
Atlético Nacional	Medellín	Atanasio Girardot	52,000
Cortuluá	Tuluá	Doce de Octubre	16,000
Deportes Quindío	Armenia	Centenario	29,000
Deportes Tolima	Ibagué	Manuel Murillo Toro	28,100
Deportivo Cali	Cali	Pascual Guerrero	45,625
Deportivo Pereira	Pereira	Hernán Ramírez Villegas	30,000
Envigado	Envigado	Polideportivo Sur	11,000
Independiente Medellín	Medellín	Atanasio Girardot	52,000
Junior	Barranquilla	Metropolitano Roberto Meléndez	60,000
Millonarios	Bogotá	Nemesio Camacho El Campín	48,300
Once Caldas	Manizales	Palogrande	36,553
Santa Fe	Bogotá	Nemesio Camacho El Campín	48,300
Unión Magdalena	Santa Marta	Eduardo Santos	23,000

== Torneo Apertura ==
The Torneo Apertura (also known as Copa Mustang I) began on 20 August and ended on 17 December 1995.

=== Group A ===
Pos	Team	Pld	W	D	L	GF	GA	GD	Pts	Bonus
1	Deportivo Cali	18	11	4	3	37	20	+17	37	+1.50 points
2	Deportes Tolima	18	8	5	5	22	24	−2	29	+0.50 points
3	Unión Magdalena	18	8	3	7	21	20	+1	27	
4	Millonarios	18	7	6	5	26	18	+8	27	
5	Once Caldas	18	5	8	5	23	20	+3	23	
6	Atlético Bucaramanga	18	6	5	7	18	20	−2	23	
7	Deportes Quindío	18	6	3	9	26	32	−6	21	
8	Independiente Medellín	18	2	5	11	17	32	−15	11	

Source: RSSSF
Rules for classification: 1) Points, 2) Wins, 3) Goal difference, 4) Goals for, 5) Away goals for, 6) Goals against, 7) Away goals against, 8) Drawing of lots.

=== Group B ===
Pos	Team	Pld	W	D	L	GF	GA	GD	Pts	Bonus
1	Atlético Nacional	18	9	5	4	29	23	+6	32	+1.00 points
2	América de Cali	18	8	6	4	39	24	+15	30	+0.75 points
3	Junior	18	7	4	7	23	26	−3	25	
4	Atlético Huila	18	6	6	6	29	35	−6	24	
5	Santa Fe	18	6	5	7	28	27	+1	23	
6	Envigado	18	5	7	6	19	19	0	22	
7	Deportivo Pereira	18	3	9	6	19	24	−5	18	
8	Cortuluá	18	2	9	7	17	29	−12	15	

Source: RSSSF
Rules for classification: 1) Points, 2) Wins, 3) Goal difference, 4) Goals for, 5) Away goals for, 6) Goals against, 7) Away goals against, 8) Drawing of lots.

== Torneo Finalización ==
The Torneo Finalización (also known as Copa Mustang II) began on 14 January and ended on 13 May 1996.

=== Standings ===
Pos	Team	Pld	W	D	L	GF	GA	GD	Pts	Bonus
1	Deportivo Cali	30	18	9	3	67	30	+37	63	+1.50 points
2	América de Cali	30	15	10	5	50	30	+20	55	+1.00 points
3	Atlético Nacional	30	15	5	10	54	34	+20	50	+0.75 points
4	Deportes Tolima	30	10	14	6	38	34	+4	44	+0.50 points
5	Once Caldas	30	12	8	10	43	40	+3	44	
6	Millonarios	30	13	4	13	44	41	+3	43	
7	Envigado	30	10	10	10	33	33	0	40	
8	Junior	30	10	9	11	50	37	+13	39	
9	Cortuluá	30	10	9	11	35	43	−8	39	
10	Unión Magdalena	30	9	11	10	34	43	−9	38	
11	Deportivo Pereira	30	9	10	11	34	39	−5	37	
12	Independiente Medellín	30	10	6	14	26	31	−5	36	
13	Atlético Bucaramanga	30	6	13	11	26	41	−15	31	
14	Deportes Quindío	30	8	7	15	37	55	−18	31	
15	Santa Fe (Note: Santa Fe were deducted two points.)	30	8	7	15	43	53	−10	29	
16	Atlético Huila	30	6	10	14	33	63	−30	28	

Source: RSSSF
Rules for classification: 1) Points, 2) Wins, 3) Goal difference, 4) Goals for, 5) Away goals for, 6) Goals against, 7) Away goals against, 8) Drawing of lots.

== Aggregate table ==
An aggregate table known as Reclasificación including the games of both tournaments (Apertura and Finalización) was used to determine the teams that would advance to the Copa Mustang final stages, as well as the teams that would play the Liguilla Pre-CONMEBOL.

Pos	Team	Pld	W	D	L	GF	GA	GD	Pts	Qualification or relegation
1	Deportivo Cali	48	29	13	6	104	50	+54	100	Advance to the Final stages
2	América de Cali	48	23	16	9	89	54	+35	85	Advance to the Final stages
3	Atlético Nacional	48	24	10	14	83	57	+26	82	Advance to the Final stages
4	Deportes Tolima	48	18	19	11	60	58	+2	73	Advance to the Final stages and qualification for the Copa CONMEBOL (Note: Since Atlético Nacional and América de Cali, who placed third and fourth in the final group, were ineligible to qualify for the 1996 Copa CONMEBOL, the berth was awarded to the aggregate table's fourth-placed team, Deportes Tolima.)
5	Millonarios	48	20	10	18	70	59	+11	70	Advance to the Final stages
6	Once Caldas	48	17	16	15	66	60	+6	67	Advance to the Final stages
7	Unión Magdalena	48	17	14	17	55	63	−8	65	Advance to the Final stages
8	Junior	48	17	13	18	73	63	+10	64	Advance to the Final stages
9	Envigado	48	15	17	16	52	52	0	62	Advance to the Liguilla Pre-CONMEBOL
10	Deportivo Pereira	48	12	19	17	53	63	−10	55	Advance to the Liguilla Pre-CONMEBOL
11	Atlético Bucaramanga	48	12	18	18	44	61	−17	54	Advance to the Liguilla Pre-CONMEBOL
12	Cortuluá	48	12	18	18	52	72	−20	54	Advance to the Liguilla Pre-CONMEBOL
13	Deportes Quindío	48	14	10	24	63	87	−24	52	Advance to the Liguilla Pre-CONMEBOL
14	Atlético Huila (R)	48	12	16	20	62	98	−36	52	Advance to the Liguilla Pre-CONMEBOL and relegation by average to Categoría Primera B
15	Santa Fe (Note: Santa Fe were deducted two points.)	48	14	12	22	71	80	−9	52	Advance to the Liguilla Pre-CONMEBOL
16	Independiente Medellín	48	12	11	25	43	63	−20	47	Advance to the Liguilla Pre-CONMEBOL

Source: RSSSF
Rules for classification: 1) Points, 2) Wins, 3) Goal difference, 4) Goals for, 5) Away goals for, 6) Goals against, 7) Away goals against, 8) Drawing of lots.
(R) Relegated

== Final stages ==
=== Semi-finals ===
==== Group A ====
Pos	Team	Pld	W	D	L	GF	GA	GD	Pts	Qualification	AME	CAL	MAG	ONC
1	América de Cali	6	3	2	1	6	2	+4	12.75 (Note: Season bonus: 1.75 points)	Advance to Final group	—	2–0	2–0	1–0
2	Deportivo Cali	6	2	1	3	6	9	−3	11 (Note: Season bonus: 4 points)	Advance to Final group	0–0	—	1–0	2–1
3	Unión Magdalena	6	3	1	2	7	7	0	10		1–0	2–1	—	3–2
4	Once Caldas	6	1	2	3	9	10	−1	5		1–1	4–2	1–1	—

Source: RSSSF
Rules for classification: 1) Points, 2) Wins, 3) Goal difference, 4) Goals for, 5) Away goals for, 6) Goals against, 7) Away goals against, 8) Drawing of lots.

==== Group B ====
Pos	Team	Pld	W	D	L	GF	GA	GD	Pts	Qualification	MIL	NAC	TOL	JUN
1	Millonarios	6	4	0	2	11	7	+4	12	Advance to Final group	—	3–0	2–1	2–0
2	Atlético Nacional	6	2	2	2	5	7	−2	9.75 (Note: Season bonus: 1.75 points)	Advance to Final group	1–2	—	2–1	1–0
3	Deportes Tolima	6	2	1	3	7	7	0	8 (Note: Season bonus: 1 point)		2–1	0–0	—	1–2
4	Junior	6	2	1	3	6	8	−2	7		3–1	1–1	0–2	—

Source: RSSSF
Rules for classification: 1) Points, 2) Wins, 3) Goal difference, 4) Goals for, 5) Away goals for, 6) Goals against, 7) Away goals against, 8) Drawing of lots.

=== Final group ===
Pos	Team	Pld	W	D	L	GF	GA	GD	Pts	Qualification	CAL	MIL	NAC	AME
1	Deportivo Cali (C)	6	3	2	1	11	7	+4	12 (Note: Apertura and Finalización bonus points: Deportivo Cali 3, Millonarios 0.)	Qualification for the Copa Libertadores	—	4–1	3–1	2–1
2	Millonarios	6	4	0	2	11	6	+5	12	Qualification for the Copa Libertadores	3–1	—	2–0	3–0
3	Atlético Nacional	6	1	2	3	6	10	−4	5	Ineligible for Copa CONMEBOL qualification (Note: Originally, the final group's third-placed team would qualify for the Copa CONMEBOL and the fourth-placed team would play a play-off against the Liguilla Pre-CONMEBOL winners for the final Copa CONMEBOL berth, however, Atlético Nacional and América de Cali were both ineligible for Copa CONMEBOL qualification since the former took part in the 1996 Supercopa Libertadores and the latter took part in the 1996 Copa Libertadores.)	1–1	0–2	—	2–0
4	América de Cali	6	1	2	3	4	9	−5	5	Ineligible for Copa CONMEBOL qualification	0–0	1–0	2–2	—

Source: RSSSF
Rules for classification: 1) Points, 2) Apertura and Finalización bonus points, 3) Wins, 4) Goal difference, 5) Goals for, 6) Away goals for, 7) Goals against, 8) Away goals against, 9) Drawing of lots.
(C) Champions

== Liguilla Pre-CONMEBOL ==
=== Liguilla semi-finals ===
==== Group C ====
Pos	Team	Pld	W	D	L	GF	GA	GD	Pts	Qualification	ENV	SFE	QUI	PER
1	Envigado	6	3	2	1	9	7	+2	12 (Note: Season bonus: 1 point)	Advance to Liguilla final group	—	2–0	1–1	2–1
2	Santa Fe	6	3	0	3	7	7	0	9	Advance to Liguilla final group	3–1	—	1–0	1–2
3	Deportes Quindío	6	2	2	2	7	5	+2	8		1–1	1–2	—	3–0
4	Deportivo Pereira	6	2	0	4	5	9	−4	6		1–2	1–0	0–1	—

Source: RSSSF
Rules for classification: 1) Points, 2) Wins, 3) Goal difference, 4) Goals for, 5) Away goals for, 6) Goals against, 7) Away goals against, 8) Drawing of lots.

==== Group D ====
Pos	Team	Pld	W	D	L	GF	GA	GD	Pts	Qualification	COR	DIM	HUI	BUC
1	Cortuluá	6	2	3	1	10	9	+1	9	Advance to Liguilla final group	—	1–0	1–1	3–0
2	Independiente Medellín	6	2	3	1	8	7	+1	9	Advance to Liguilla final group	4–4	—	1–0	1–0
3	Atlético Huila	6	2	2	2	8	4	+4	8		3–0	0–0	—	4–1
4	Atlético Bucaramanga	6	1	2	3	5	11	−6	5		1–1	2–2	1–0	—

Source: RSSSF
Rules for classification: 1) Points, 2) Wins, 3) Goal difference, 4) Goals for, 5) Away goals for, 6) Goals against, 7) Away goals against, 8) Drawing of lots.

=== Liguilla final group ===
Pos	Team	Pld	W	D	L	GF	GA	GD	Pts	Qualification	SFE	ENV	COR	DIM
1	Santa Fe	6	4	2	0	11	4	+7	14	Qualification for the Copa CONMEBOL (Note: Santa Fe qualified for the Copa CONMEBOL as Liguilla Pre-CONMEBOL winners since the final group's fourth-placed team América de Cali was ineligible for Copa CONMEBOL qualification.)	—	1–0	2–0	3–1
2	Envigado	6	3	2	1	6	3	+3	11		1–1	—	1–0	1–0
3	Cortuluá	6	1	3	2	6	8	−2	6		1–1	1–1	—	1–0
4	Independiente Medellín	6	0	1	5	5	13	−8	1		1–3	0–2	3–3	—

Source: RSSSF
Rules for classification: 1) Points, 2) Apertura and Finalización bonus points, 3) Wins, 4) Goal difference, 5) Goals for, 6) Away goals for, 7) Goals against, 8) Away goals against, 9) Drawing of lots.

== Top goalscorers ==
Rank	Player	Club	Goals
1	(Colombia) Iván Valenciano	Junior	36
2	(Colombia) Víctor Aristizábal	Atlético Nacional	33
2	(Colombia) Edison Mafla	Deportivo Cali	33
4	(Colombia) Adolfo Valencia	Santa Fe	25
5	(Colombia) Hugo Arrieta	Deportivo Pereira	24
6	(Colombia) Manuel Acisclo Córdoba	Atlético Huila	22
6	(Colombia) Rubén Darío Hernández	Santa Fe	22
8	(Colombia) Antony de Ávila	América de Cali	21
8	(Colombia) Walter Escobar	Deportivo Cali	21
8	(Argentina) Daniel Tílger	Deportes Quindío	21

Source: Historia del Fútbol Profesional Colombiano 70 Años
