= Quarentinha =

Brazilian footballer

Personal information
- Full name: Waldir Cardoso Lebrêgo
- Date of birth: 15 September 1933
- Place of birth: Belém, Brazil
- Date of death: 11 February 1996 (aged 62)
- Place of death: Rio de Janeiro, Brazil
- Position: Striker

Senior career*
Years	Team	Apps	(Gls)
1950–1952	Paysandu		
1953	Vitória		
1954–1955	Botafogo		
1956	Bonsucesso		
1956–1964	Botafogo		
1965-1966	Unión Magdalena	54	(38)
1967	Deportivo Cali	24	(11)
1968	Junior de Barranquilla	29	(13)

International career
1959–1963	Brazil	13	(14)
- * Club domestic league appearances and goals

Waldir Cardoso Lebrêgo, best known as Quarentinha (Brazilian Portuguese: [kwɐɾenˈtʃĩɲɐ]; born in Belém, Pará State, 15 September 1933 – died in Rio de Janeiro, 11 February 1996) was a Brazilian football (soccer) player who played as a forward and was notable for his fearsome left foot.

== Club career ==
Quarentinha played for Paysandu and Vitória, before joining Botafogo. After a short spell with Bonsucesso he returned to Botafogo and later played in Colombia.

He won one Bahia State League (1953), three Rio de Janeiro State League (1957, 1961, 1962), two Rio - São Paulo Cup (1962, 1964), one Mexico Tournament (1962) and one Paris Tournament (1963). He was also the top goalscorer for three consecutive years in Rio Leagues (1958, 1959, 1960).

== Club Career stats ==
As of match played 18 July 2023

Club	Season	League			State League		Friendly		Torneio Rio–São Paulo		Other		Total	
Club	Season	Division	Apps	Goals	Apps	Goals	Apps	Goals	Apps	Goals	Apps	Goals	Apps	Goals
Paysandu	1952	Campeonato Paraense	0	0	-	9	—		—		—		-	9
Paysandu	1953	Campeonato Paraense	0	0	-	1	—		—		—		-	1
Paysandu	Subtotal		-	-	-	10	-	-	-	-	-	-	-	10
Vitória	1953	Campeonato Baiano	0	0		14	—		—		—		-	14
Botafogo	1954	Série A	0	0	-	4	—		-	1	—		-	5
Botafogo	1955	Série A	0	0	-	1	—		-	0	—		-	1
Botafogo	1957	Série A	0	0	-	13	—		-	1	—		-	14
Botafogo	1958	Série A	0	0	-	20	—		-	6	5	10 (Note: Goals in Torneio João Teixeira de Carvalho)	-	36
Botafogo	1959	Série A	0	0	-	27	—		-	2	—		-	29
Botafogo	1960	Série A	0	0	-	25	—		-	11	—		-	26
Botafogo	1961	Série A	0	0	-	0	—		-	7	—		-	7
Botafogo	1962	Série A	3	2	-	19	—		-	0	—		-	22
Botafogo	1963	Série A	4	2	-	11	—		-	6	2 (Note: Appearances in Copa Libertadores)	0	-	19
Botafogo	1964	Série A	0	0	-	15	—		-	1	3 (Note: Appearances in Campeonato Carioca de Aspirantes)	6	-	22
Botafogo	Subtotal		7	4	155	134	208	124	67	36	10	16	447	314
Bonsucesso	1956	Campeonato Carioca	0	0	-	15	0	0	—		-	3 (Note: Goals in Torneio Início do Campeonato Carioca)	-	18
Unión Magdalena	1965	Categoría Primera A	39	26	—		—		—		—		39	26
Unión Magdalena	1966	Categoría Primera A	15	12	—		—		—		—		15	12
Deportivo Cali	1966	Categoría Primera A	24	11	—		—		—		—		24	11
Deportivo Cali	1967	Categoría Primera A	29	13	—		—		—		—		29	13
América	1968	Campeonato Catarinense	0	0	-	0	0	0	—		-	4 (Note: Goals in Torneio Centro-Sul)	-	4
Almirante Barroso	1970	Campeonato Catarinense	0	0	-	2	0	0	—		—		-	2
Career total			114	66	-	175	208	124	-	36	-	23	-	424

== International career ==
Quarentinha won 13 international caps for the Brazil national football team between 1959 and 1963, scoring 14 goals. Quarentinha also played six friendly games for Brazil in which he scored six additional goals. His greatest regret was to be left out of the Brazilian squad that defended the World Championship crown in Chile in 1962. On 12 May 1963 he was in the squad at San Siro Stadium, in a match against Italy, Pelé's only game played in Italy. He never played in FIFA World Cup and died at 62.

== International Career stats ==
As of 3 July 2023

Appearances and goals by national team and year
National team	Year	Apps	Goals
Brazil	1959	2	3
Brazil	1960	4	6
Brazil	1961	2	1
Brazil	1963	5	4
Total		13	14

Scores and results list Brazil's goal tally first, score column indicates score after each Quarentinha goal.

List of international goals scored by Quarentinha
No.	Date	Venue	Opponent	Score	Result	Competition
1	17 September 1959	Maracanã Stadium, Rio de Janeiro, Brazil	Chile	5–0	7–0	Friendly
2	17 September 1959	Maracanã Stadium, Rio de Janeiro, Brazil	Chile	6–0	7–0	Friendly
3	20 September 1959	Pacaembu Stadium, São Paulo, Brazil	Chile	1–0	1–0	Friendly
4	29 April 1960	Cairo International Stadium, Cairo, Egypt	United Arab Republic	1–0	5–0	Friendly
5	29 April 1960	Cairo International Stadium, Cairo, Egypt	United Arab Republic	5–0	5–0	Friendly
6	6 May 1960	Cairo International Stadium, Cairo, Egypt	United Arab Republic	1–0	3–0	Friendly
7	6 May 1960	Cairo International Stadium, Cairo, Egypt	United Arab Republic	3–0	3–0	Friendly
8	10 May 1960	Parken Stadium, Copenhagen, Denmark	Denmark	1–1	3–4	Friendly
9	10 May 1960	Parken Stadium, Copenhagen, Denmark	Denmark	2–3	3–4	Friendly
10	3 May 1961	Estadio Defensores del Chaco, Asunción, Paraguay	Paraguay	3–2	3–2	Friendly
11	24 April 1963	King Baudouin Stadium, Brussels, Belgium	Belgium	1–5	1–5	Friendly
12	17 May 1963	Cairo International Stadium, Cairo, Egypt	United Arab Republic	1–0	1–0	Friendly
13	19 May 1963	Ramat Gan Stadium, Tel Aviv District, Israel	Israel	2–0	5–0	Friendly
14	19 May 1963	Ramat Gan Stadium, Tel Aviv District, Israel	Israel	3–0	5–0	Friendly

== Personal life ==
Quarentinha is son of the also footballer Quarenta, which gave him this nickname.
