= Ernesto Álvarez (footballer, born 1948) =

Argentine footballer (1948–2019)

Ernesto Juan Álvarez (1 October 1948 - 22 August 2019) was an Argentine footballer who played as a midfielder.

== Early life ==
Álvarez was born in 1948 in Gualeguaychú, Argentina.

== Playing career ==
Álvarez was nicknamed "Cachirulo" and "Cococho" during his playing career. He was regarded as one of the most important players for Colombian side Deportivo Cali during the late 1970s to early 1980s, making 226 league appearances.

== Style of play ==
Álvarez mainly operated as a midfielder and was known for his ability to score goals directly from corner kicks ("Olímpicos, "Olympic goals").

== Managerial career ==
AFter retiring from professional football, Álvarez worked as a youth manager.
