= 1965 Campeonato Profesional =

Campeonato Profesional
- Season: 1965
- Champions: Deportivo Cali (1st title)
- Matches: 312
- Goals: 992 (3.18 per match)
- Top goalscorer: Perfecto Rodríguez (38 goals)
- Biggest home win: América de Cali 6–0 Cúcuta Deportivo; Deportivo Cali 6–0 Deportes Quindío
- Biggest away win: Independiente Medellín 1–5 Millonarios; Cúcuta Deportivo 1–5 Santa Fe
- Highest scoring: Millonarios 7–4 Independiente Medellín

The 1965 Campeonato Profesional was the 18th season of Colombia's top-flight football league. 13 teams competed against one another. Deportivo Cali won their first league title in history, cutting a streak of four straight championships won by Millonarios.

== Background and league system ==
The same 13 teams from the last tournament competed in this one. The tournament was once again played under a round-robin format, with every team playing each other four times (twice at home and twice away) for a total of 48 matches. Teams received two points for a win and one point for a draw. If two or more teams were tied on points, places were determined by goal difference. The team with the most points became the champion of the league. 312 matches were played during the season, with a total of 992 goals scored. Deportivo Cali won the championship for the first time, the runners-up were Atlético Nacional. Santa Fe scored the highest number of goals, with 99 goals scored, Cúcuta Deportivo conceded the most goals with 102 goals against. Argentine player Perfecto Rodríguez, who played for Independiente Medellín, was the season's top goalscorer with 38 goals.

== Teams ==
Locations of the 1965 Campeonato Profesional teams:
- 1. Armenia
- 2. Bogotá
- 3. Bucaramanga
- 4. Cali
- 5. Cúcuta
- 6. Ibagué
- 7. Manizales
- 8. Medellín
- 9. Pereira
- 10. Santa Marta

| Team | City | Stadium |
|---|---|---|
| América de Cali | Cali | Estadio Olímpico Pascual Guerrero |
| Atlético Bucaramanga | Bucaramanga | Estadio Alfonso López |
| Atlético Nacional | Medellín | Estadio Atanasio Girardot |
| Cúcuta Deportivo | Cúcuta | Estadio General Santander |
| Deportes Quindío | Armenia | Estadio San José de Armenia |
| Deportes Tolima | Ibagué | Estadio Serrano de Ávila |
| Deportivo Cali | Cali | Estadio Olímpico Pascual Guerrero |
| Deportivo Pereira | Pereira | Estadio Alberto Mora Mora |
| Independiente Medellín | Medellín | Estadio Atanasio Girardot |
| Millonarios | Bogotá | Estadio El Campín |
| Once Caldas | Manizales | Estadio Fernando Londoño Londoño |
| Santa Fe | Bogotá | Estadio El Campín |
| Unión Magdalena | Santa Marta | Estadio Eduardo Santos |

== Final standings ==
| Pos | Team | Pld | W | D | L | GF | GA | GD | Pts |
|---|---|---|---|---|---|---|---|---|---|
| 1 | Deportivo Cali (Note: Deportivo Cali and Atlético Nacional (runners-up) were unable to enter the 1966 Copa Libertadores due to a conflict between the FIFA-recognized Asociación de Fútbol Colombiano (Adefútbol) and DIMAYOR, which derived into the suspension of the Colombian Football Federation by FIFA.) (C) | 48 | 27 | 8 | 13 | 93 | 66 | +27 | 62 |
| 2 | Atlético Nacional | 48 | 22 | 16 | 10 | 71 | 58 | +13 | 60 |
| 3 | Millonarios | 48 | 18 | 21 | 9 | 91 | 65 | +26 | 57 |
| 4 | Deportivo Pereira | 48 | 22 | 12 | 14 | 92 | 56 | +36 | 56 |
| 5 | Santa Fe | 48 | 22 | 12 | 14 | 99 | 74 | +25 | 56 |
| 6 | América de Cali | 48 | 14 | 22 | 12 | 77 | 67 | +10 | 50 |
| 7 | Once Caldas | 48 | 15 | 17 | 16 | 75 | 77 | −2 | 47 |
| 8 | Independiente Medellín | 48 | 16 | 14 | 18 | 90 | 91 | −1 | 46 |
| 9 | Atlético Bucaramanga | 48 | 17 | 11 | 20 | 66 | 80 | −14 | 45 |
| 10 | Unión Magdalena | 48 | 14 | 16 | 18 | 68 | 77 | −9 | 44 |
| 11 | Deportes Tolima | 48 | 14 | 11 | 23 | 53 | 89 | −36 | 39 |
| 12 | Deportes Quindío | 48 | 11 | 10 | 27 | 64 | 90 | −26 | 32 |
| 13 | Cúcuta Deportivo | 48 | 10 | 10 | 28 | 53 | 102 | −49 | 30 |

Source: RSSSF
(C) Champions

== Results ==
=== First turn ===
| Home \ Away | AME | BUC | CAL | CUC | DIM | MAG | MIL | NAC | ONC | PER | QUI | SFE | TOL |
|---|---|---|---|---|---|---|---|---|---|---|---|---|---|
| América de Cali | | 1–0 | 2–0 | 6–0 | 2–3 | 4–0 | 1–1 | 0–1 | 0–0 | 0–2 | 0–1 | 1–1 | 4–0 |
| Atlético Bucaramanga | 2–2 | | 4–2 | 1–0 | 3–2 | 1–2 | 0–1 | 2–2 | 1–1 | 0–1 | 1–0 | 2–3 | 1–1 |
| Deportivo Cali | 0–0 | 1–1 | | 2–0 | 4–2 | 3–2 | 1–1 | 2–1 | 2–0 | 1–0 | 6–0 | 3–2 | 3–1 |
| Cúcuta Deportivo | 0–1 | 0–0 | 1–3 | | 3–2 | 1–3 | 0–0 | 1–1 | 2–0 | 2–1 | 0–3 | 1–4 | 2–2 |
| Independiente Medellín | 2–2 | 0–1 | 1–2 | 4–0 | | 1–1 | 1–5 | 4–1 | 5–2 | 1–0 | 5–3 | 2–1 | 0–1 |
| Unión Magdalena | 3–0 | 1–0 | 1–1 | 1–2 | 1–3 | | 2–1 | 2–1 | 1–1 | 2–2 | 1–1 | 1–1 | 5–2 |
| Millonarios | 3–3 | 5–2 | 2–4 | 3–1 | 7–4 | 1–1 | | 2–1 | 1–1 | 2–2 | 1–0 | 2–2 | 1–1 |
| Atlético Nacional | 1–1 | 1–0 | 1–2 | 2–0 | 2–1 | 3–2 | 1–4 | | 2–2 | 0–2 | 3–2 | 1–0 | 2–0 |
| Once Caldas | 3–4 | 2–0 | 4–1 | 2–0 | 1–1 | 2–2 | 2–2 | 1–2 | | 0–1 | 3–0 | 1–1 | 2–2 |
| Deportivo Pereira | 2–2 | 1–0 | 2–1 | 5–1 | 0–0 | 2–0 | 1–1 | 1–2 | 0–0 | | 2–0 | 3–1 | 5–1 |
| Deportes Quindío | 2–2 | 4–0 | 1–2 | 0–0 | 4–2 | 1–1 | 1–1 | 2–0 | 0–1 | 1–3 | | 1–1 | 5–2 |
| Santa Fe | 0–0 | 5–1 | 2–1 | 2–2 | 4–1 | 4–1 | 1–0 | 0–2 | 2–1 | 3–2 | 4–2 | | 1–0 |
| Deportes Tolima | 2–1 | 1–1 | 0–1 | 3–0 | 2–1 | 2–0 | 0–2 | 0–0 | 2–2 | 2–1 | 2–1 | 0–1 | |

Legend: Blue = home team win; Yellow = draw; Red = away team win.

=== Second turn ===
| Home \ Away | AME | BUC | CAL | CUC | DIM | MAG | MIL | NAC | ONC | PER | QUI | SFE | TOL |
|---|---|---|---|---|---|---|---|---|---|---|---|---|---|
| América de Cali | | 1–1 | 2–3 | 1–1 | 1–1 | 1–1 | 3–3 | 2–2 | 5–3 | 1–1 | 1–3 | 3–3 | 2–0 |
| Atlético Bucaramanga | 1–0 | | 4–3 | 2–1 | 3–1 | 1–1 | 1–4 | 1–0 | 2–1 | 1–1 | 3–2 | 1–0 | 5–0 |
| Deportivo Cali | 1–2 | 5–2 | | 1–0 | 0–0 | 4–0 | 1–0 | 1–0 | 2–1 | 4–0 | 2–1 | 0–3 | 1–1 |
| Cúcuta Deportivo | 0–1 | 0–1 | 1–3 | | 2–2 | 0–1 | 2–0 | 1–1 | 5–2 | 3–1 | 0–0 | 1–5 | 4–1 |
| Independiente Medellín | 1–0 | 1–0 | 3–4 | 4–2 | | 3–3 | 0–0 | 1–1 | 3–0 | 0–3 | 2–1 | 1–3 | 4–0 |
| Unión Magdalena | 1–2 | 5–1 | 1–0 | 1–2 | 1–1 | | 1–1 | 0–2 | 0–0 | 3–1 | 1–0 | 2–1 | 0–1 |
| Millonarios | 1–2 | 1–0 | 2–2 | 3–0 | 4–4 | 4–3 | | 0–0 | 1–2 | 2–2 | 3–1 | 2–1 | 4–0 |
| Atlético Nacional | 1–1 | 4–2 | 3–2 | 3–1 | 1–1 | 2–1 | 2–0 | | 3–2 | 1–0 | 4–3 | 2–1 | 2–2 |
| Once Caldas | 2–1 | 2–1 | 3–2 | 5–1 | 2–2 | 1–2 | 2–2 | 0–0 | | 1–0 | 4–1 | 2–2 | 1–0 |
| Deportivo Pereira | 2–3 | 5–1 | 1–1 | 6–1 | 4–1 | 1–1 | 2–0 | 1–1 | 2–0 | | 2–0 | 3–1 | 5–0 |
| Deportes Quindío | 0–0 | 1–1 | 2–1 | 3–4 | 1–3 | 2–0 | 0–2 | 0–1 | 2–0 | 3–2 | | 2–2 | 1–2 |
| Santa Fe | 5–2 | 1–4 | 3–1 | 3–2 | 1–2 | 3–1 | 1–1 | 1–1 | 3–4 | 3–2 | 4–0 | | 3–1 |
| Deportes Tolima | 1–1 | 1–3 | 0–1 | 1–0 | 2–1 | 3–2 | 0–2 | 1–1 | 0–1 | 1–3 | 3–0 | 3–0 | |

Legend: Blue = home team win; Yellow = draw; Red = away team win.

== Top goalscorers ==
| Rank | Name | Club | Goals |
|---|---|---|---|
| 1 | (Argentina) Perfecto Rodríguez | Independiente Medellín | 38 |
| 2 | (Colombia) Jorge Ramírez Gallego | Deportivo Cali | 32 |
| 3 | (Colombia) Efraín Padilla | Deportivo Pereira | 30 |
| 4 | (Brazil) Waldir Cardoso | Unión Magdalena | 27 |
| 5 | (Argentina) Omar Devani | Santa Fe | 26 |
| 6 | (Colombia) Harvey Colonia | América de Cali | 23 |
| 7 | (Brazil) Sílvio Faria | Millonarios | 21 |
| 7 | (Colombia) Alfonso Cañón | Santa Fe | 21 |
| 9 | (Argentina) Horacio Di Loreto | Atlético Bucaramanga | 20 |

Source: RSSSF.com Colombia 1965
