= Clásico Vallecaucano =

Valle del Cauca Derby Clásico Vallecaucano
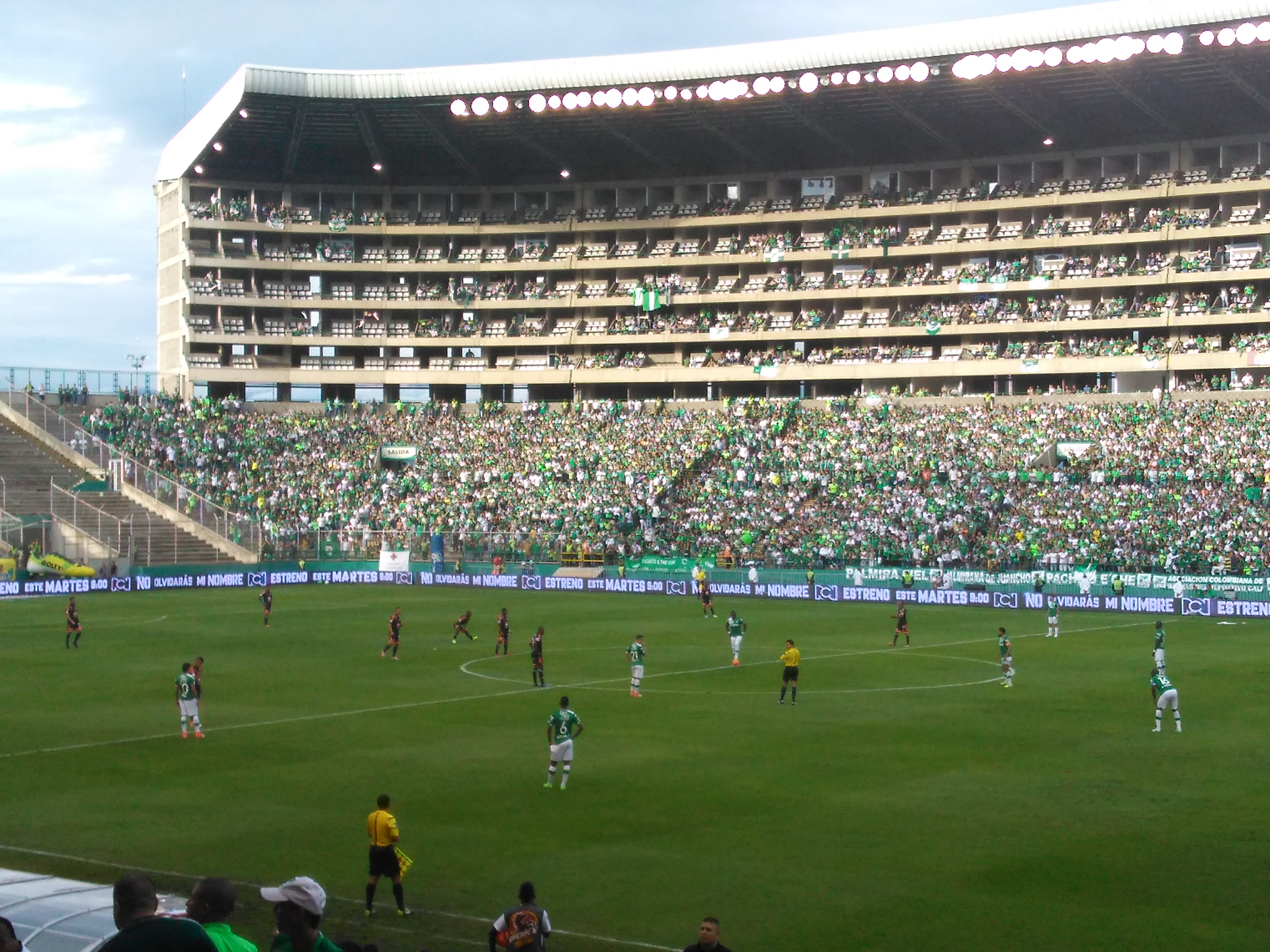
- Derby played on 11 June 2017 at Estadio Deportivo Cali, second leg of the 2017 Apertura semifinals
- Location: Cali, Colombia
- Teams: América de Cali; Deportivo Cali
- First meeting: Deportivo Cali 4–3 América; Campeonato Profesional (26 September 1948)
- Latest meeting: América 0–0 Deportivo Cali; 2026 Finalización (7 November 2026)
- Next meeting: América vs. Deportivo Cali; 2026 Finalización (24 November 2026)
- Stadiums: Pascual Guerrero (América de Cali); Deportivo Cali (Deportivo Cali)

Statistics
- Total meetings: 347 matches
- Most wins: Deportivo Cali (127)
- Top scorer: Antony de Ávila (19 goals)
- All-time series: Deportivo Cali: 127; Drawn: 112; América: 108
- Largest victory: América 5–0 Deportivo Cali (29 June 1961)

The Clásico Vallecaucano (Spanish for "Valle del Cauca Derby") is a football local derby contested between América de Cali and Deportivo Cali, both clubs based in Cali, Colombia. It is regarded as one of Colombia's oldest and most passionate rivalries, having been first played in an amateur regional championship in 1931, and with both contenders being closely matched in the all-time series. It has also been mentioned as one of the world's greatest football derbies by international media, being ranked 40th in a list of the 50 biggest derbies in world football published by the FourFourTwo magazine in April 2021.

== History ==
The rivalry between the two top clubs from Cali can be traced back to their cultural and social origins. Deportivo Cali, founded in 1912 as The Cali Football Club by a group of students returning from Europe, has always been considered the representative of the wealthy classes of the city and the Valle del Cauca region. On the other hand, América de Cali (founded in 1927) attracted supporters from the poorest, working class and popular areas of the city since its beginnings. Their first meeting is reported to have been held in a regional tournament in 1931, and was won by Deportivo Cali 1–0 after América de Cali had two goals disallowed for offside. América de Cali protested against the refereeing of this match and the club was handed a one-year suspension from local tournaments as a result. The first match between both teams in the professional league was played on 26 September 1948, with Deportivo Cali winning by a score of 4–3.

The performances of both clubs have also offered further reasons for contrast between them throughout time, with Deportivo Cali cementing their status as one of Colombia's top clubs by winning five league titles between 1965 and 1974, whilst América de Cali had to wait 35 years for their first domestic title in 1979. Furthermore, América de Cali's success during the 1980s in which the team won the domestic league five times in a row between 1982 and 1986 as well as reaching the Copa Libertadores final thrice in a row between 1985 and 1987 attracted fans from all over Colombia, greatly increasing América's supporter base. América de Cali's 1986 league title was clinched with a victory over their crosstown rival, while Deportivo Cali clinched their sixth league title in 1996 (and first in 22 years) with a scoreless draw against América de Cali on the last day of the season. With the adoption of barra brava culture by Colombian football fans in the early years of the 1990s, the rivalry between both sets of fans turned violent and matches between both teams started demanding an increased level of safety.

== Statistics ==
=== Head-to-head ===
As of 7 November 2026

Competition	Matches	Wins América de Cali	Draws	Wins Deportivo Cali	Goals América de Cali	Goals Deportivo Cali
Categoría Primera A	310	100	98	112	388	390
Copa Colombia	28	5	12	11	27	33
Copa Libertadores	7	2	2	3	7	10
Copa Sudamericana	2	1	0	1	2	1
Total	347	108	112	127	424	434

=== Honours ===
Major honours won
Competition	América de Cali	Deportivo Cali
Categoría Primera A	15	10
Copa Colombia	0	1
Superliga Colombiana	0	1
Copa Merconorte	1	0
Copa Simón Bolívar	1	0
Total	17	12

=== Records ===
- Record wins
  - América de Cali:
    - Home: América de Cali – Deportivo Cali 5–0, Estadio Pascual Guerrero, 29 June 1961
    - Away: Deportivo Cali – América de Cali 0–4, Estadio Pascual Guerrero, 14 November 1993
      Deportivo Cali – América de Cali 0–4, Estadio Pascual Guerrero, 22 March 2008
  - Deportivo Cali:
    - Home: Deportivo Cali – América de Cali 5–1, Estadio Pascual Guerrero, 18 April 1951
      Deportivo Cali – América de Cali 6–3, Estadio Deportivo Cali, 10 October 2010
    - Away: América de Cali – Deportivo Cali 1–4, Estadio Pascual Guerrero, 2 October 1949
      América de Cali – Deportivo Cali 1–4, Estadio Pascual Guerrero, 3 March 1968
