= Ernesto Hernández =

Uruguayan footballer (born 1985)

Personal information
- Full name: Ernesto Exequiel Hernández Oncina
- Date of birth: 26 July 1985 (age 41)
- Place of birth: Montevideo, Uruguay
- Height: 1.84 m (6 ft 0 in)
- Position: Goalkeeper

Team information
- Current team: Boston River
- Number: 33

Youth career
- Sud América

Senior career*
Years	Team	Apps	(Gls)
2003–2006	Sud América		
2006–2011	River Plate Montevideo		
2010	→ Peñarol (loan)	0	(0)
2011–2012	El Tanque Sisley	22	(0)
2012–2013	Uniautónoma	33	(0)
2013	Gimnasia y Tiro	7	(0)
2014	Atlético Huila	40	(0)
2015–2017	Deportivo Cali	67	(0)
2017	Rionegro Águilas	20	(0)
2018	Deportivo Pasto	14	(0)
2019	Fénix	0	(0)
2019	Atlético Grau	3	(0)
2019	Envigado	9	(0)
2020	Fénix	3	(0)
2021	Sport Chavelines	8	(0)
2021–2022	Cortuluá	56	(0)
2025–	Boston River	4	(0)
- * Club domestic league appearances and goals as of 1 October 2025

Ernesto Hernández (born 26 July 1985) is a Uruguayan professional footballer who plays as a goalkeeper for Boston River.
