= Quarenta =

Brazilian footballer

Personal information
- Full name: Luís Gonzaga Lebrêgo
- Date of birth: 17 September 1910
- Place of birth: Portuguese Cape Verde
- Date of death: 28 March 1984 (aged 73)
- Place of death: Belém, Brazil
- Position: Forward

Senior career*
| Years | Team | Apps | (Gls) |
| 1927–1933 | Paysandu | | |
| 1933 | Vasco da Gama | | |
| 1934–1945 | Paysandu | | |
- * Club domestic league appearances and goals as of 31 January 2024

Luís Gonzaga Lebrêgo (17 September 1910 – 28 March 1984), better known as Quarenta, was a Cape Verdean-born professional footballer who played as a forward.

== Career ==
Born in Portuguese Cape Verde, being regarded as a Portuguese citizen, and orphaned by his father and mother. Adopted by priests from the Dom Macedo Costa Asylum, he was taken to Brazil in an early age. He gained the nickname Quarenta (Forty) because that was his registration number at the orphanage.

He began his career as a player at the age of 17 at Paysandu, and with the club he won state tournaments on ten occasions, in addition to scoring more than 200 goals for the club. He had a brief spell at Vasco in 1933.

== Personal life ==
Quarenta is father of the footballer Quarentinha.

== Honours ==
Paysandu

- Campeonato Paraense: 1928, 1929, 1931, 1932, 1934, 1939, 1942, 1943, 1944, 1945
