= Emilio Reuben =

Canadian soccer player

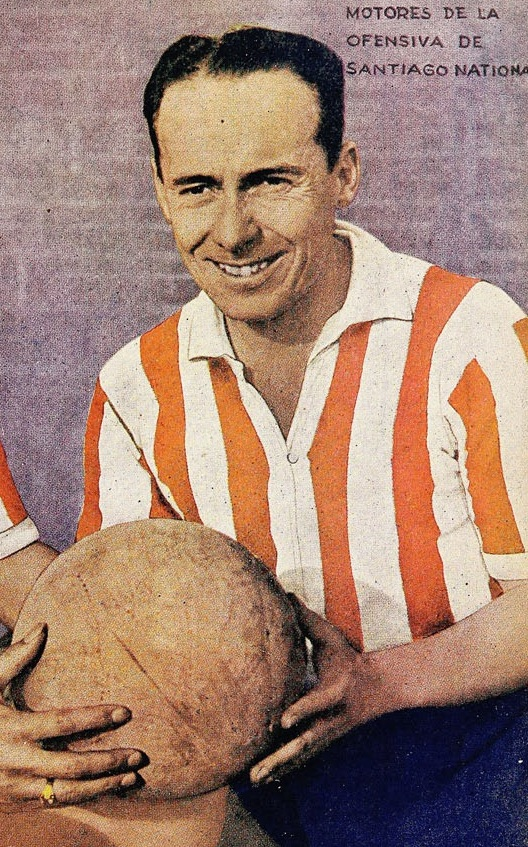
- Reuben with Santiago National in 1945

Personal information
- Full name: Moisés Emilio Reuben
- Date of birth: 2 February 1913
- Place of birth: Vancouver, Canada
- Date of death: 20 June 1988 (aged 75)
- Place of death: Vicente López, Argentina
- Position: Striker

Youth career
- Independiente Posadas
- Vélez Sársfield

Senior career*
| Years | Team | Apps | (Gls) |
| 1933–1936 | Vélez Sársfield | 97 | (37) |
| 1937–1941 | Independiente | 73 | (31) |
| 1941–1942 | Flamengo | 7 | (4) |
| 1942 | Lanús | 26 | (4) |
| 1943–1944 | Racing Montevideo | | |
| 1944–1947 | Santiago National | | |
| 1947–1948 | Deportivo Cali | | |
| 1949 | América de Cali | | |
| 1950 | Audax Italiano | 1 | (0) |
- * Club domestic league appearances and goals

Moisés Emilio Reuben (2 February 1913 – 20 June 1988) was a Canadian soccer player who played as a striker.

== Career ==
Reuben played in Argentina, Brazil, Uruguay, Chile and Colombia for Vélez Sársfield, Independiente, Lanús, Flamengo, Santiago National, Deportivo Cali, Racing Club de Montevideo, among others. On 5 September 1948, Reuben scored two goals as Deportivo Cali defeated Atlético Municipal 4–1 to record their first victory in the 1948 Campeonato Profesional, the first season of Colombia's top-flight football league.

His last club was Audax Italiano in 1950.

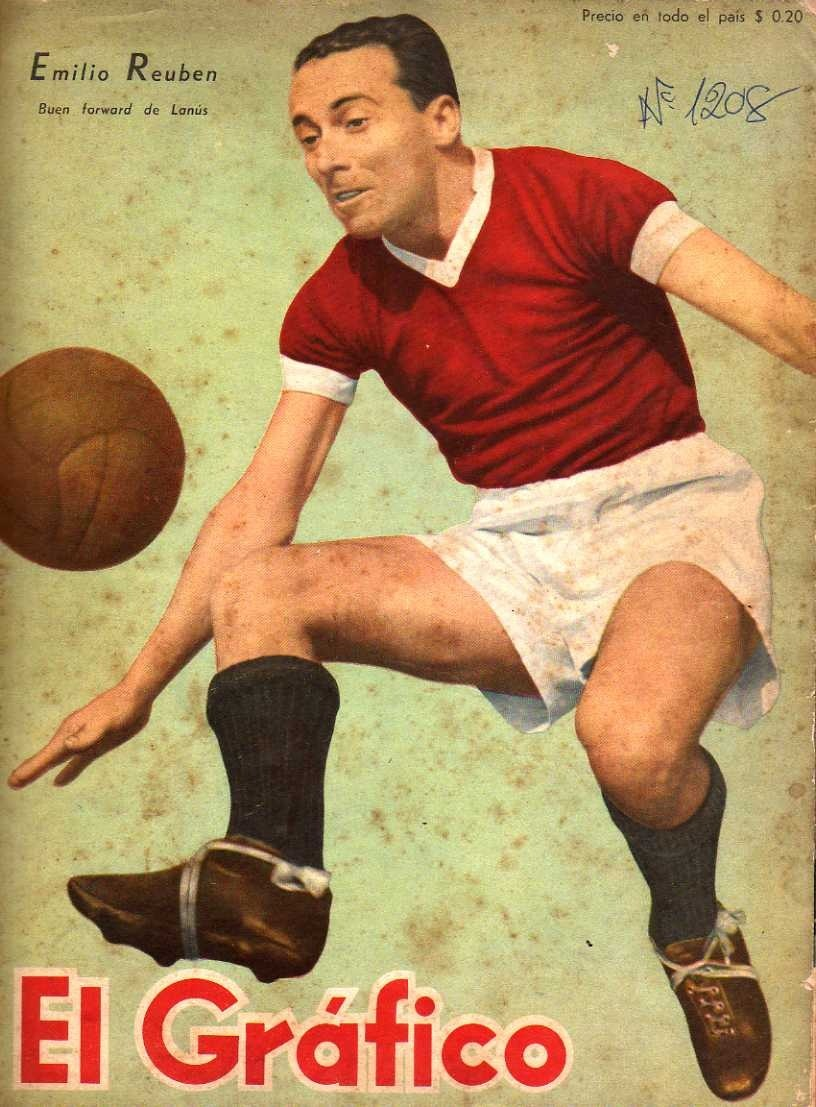
Reuben with Lanús in 1942
