= Walter Escobar =

Colombian footballer (born 1968)

Personal information
- Full name: Walter Escobar Gonzalias
- Date of birth: 26 September 1968 (age 58)
- Place of birth: Padilla, Cauca, Colombia
- Height: 1.75 m (5 ft 9 in)
- Position: Striker

Senior career*
Years	Team	Apps	(Gls)
1988–1991	Deportivo Cali		
1992	Tulúa		
1993	Atlético Huila		
1994	Deportivo Pereira		
1995–1998	Deportivo Cali		
1999	Atlético Nacional		
2000	Defensor Sporting	16	(4)
2000	Independiente Medellín		
2001	Atlético Nacional		
2001	Olimpia		
2002–2003	Deportivo Pasto		
2003–2004	FAS		
2009–2010	Depor		

International career^{‡}
1996–1997	Colombia	3	(1)
- * Club domestic league appearances and goals as of July 23, 2009 ‡ National team caps and goals as of July 23, 2009

Walter Escobar romero (born 26 September 1968) is a Colombian retired footballer.

== International career ==
He has made three appearances for the Colombia national football team, scoring one goal.
