= 1967 Campeonato Profesional =

Campeonato Profesional
- Season: 1967
- Champions: Deportivo Cali (2nd title)
- Copa Libertadores: Deportivo Cali; Millonarios
- Matches: 364
- Top goalscorer: José María Ferrero (38 goals)

The 1967 Campeonato Profesional was the 20th season of Colombia's top-flight football league. 14 teams competed against one another. Deportivo Cali won their second league title.

== Teams ==
Team	City	Stadium
América de Cali	Cali	Estadio Olímpico Pascual Guerrero
Atlético Bucaramanga	Bucaramanga	Estadio Alfonso López
Atlético Nacional	Medellín	Estadio Atanasio Girardot
Cúcuta Deportivo	Cúcuta	Estadio General Santander
Deportes Quindío	Armenia	Estadio San José de Armenia
Deportes Tolima	Ibagué	Estadio Serrano de Ávila
Deportivo Cali	Cali	Estadio Olímpico Pascual Guerrero
Deportivo Pereira	Pereira	Estadio Alberto Mora Mora
Independiente Medellín	Medellín	Estadio Atanasio Girardot
Junior	Barranquilla	Estadio Romelio Martínez
Millonarios	Bogotá	Estadio El Campín
Once Caldas	Manizales	Estadio Fernando Londoño Londoño
Santa Fe	Bogotá	Estadio El Campín
Unión Magdalena	Santa Marta	Estadio Eduardo Santos

== Standings ==
Pos	Team	Pld	W	D	L	GF	GA	GD	Pts	Qualification or relegation
1	Deportivo Cali (C)	52	29	15	8	89	48	+41	73	1968 Copa Libertadores
2	Millonarios	52	26	13	13	109	74	+35	65	1968 Copa Libertadores
3	América de Cali	52	20	21	11	85	69	+16	61	
4	Deportivo Pereira	52	19	22	11	88	73	+15	60	
5	Junior	52	24	11	17	80	64	+16	59	
6	Santa Fe	52	19	15	18	87	79	+8	53	
7	Deportes Quindío	52	16	18	18	79	82	−3	50	
8	Cúcuta Deportivo	52	16	17	19	68	77	−9	49	
9	Independiente Medellín	52	16	17	19	71	83	−12	49	
10	Unión Magdalena	52	15	17	20	94	96	−2	47	
11	Atlético Nacional	52	14	19	19	75	81	−6	47	
12	Atlético Bucaramanga	52	14	17	21	57	77	−20	45	
13	Once Caldas	52	13	13	26	77	92	−15	39	
14	Deportes Tolima	52	7	17	28	46	110	−64	31	

Source: RSSSF
(C) Champions

Source: RSSSF.com Colombia 1967

== Results ==
=== Matchdays 1-26 ===
_{Home}\^{Away}	AME	BUC	CAL	CUC	JUN	MAG	DIM	MIL	NAC	ONC	PER	QUI	SFE	TOL
América	—	2–1	2–0	2–1	2–0	4–1	0–2	1–1	2–0	2–1	1–1	2–2	1–0	2–0
Bucaramanga	0–0	—	2–2	2–1	3–2	1–0	0–2	2–2	1–1	1–2	0–2	1–0	1–1	1–1
Cali	2–2	2–0	—	3–0	0–0	3–1	0–0	1–0	4–2	2–1	2–4	1–1	0–2	5–1
Cúcuta	1–1	2–2	1–0	—	2–1	2–1	1–2	3–2	2–1	2–2	3–2	2–2	2–1	1–1
Junior	2–2	2–0	1–0	1–0	—	1–1	2–0	2–1	0–0	2–0	5–3	1–5	0–1	2–0
Magdalena	3–1	2–0	1–5	2–1	1–0	—	2–2	2–0	5–1	4–2	0–1	5–3	2–2	2–0
Medellín	2–2	0–0	3–5	0–0	1–0	2–2	—	3–1	1–2	2–2	1–2	3–3	2–1	4–1
Millonarios	4–1	3–2	1–2	4–1	0–0	3–0	3–2	—	1–1	4–3	2–3	1–0	4–2	4–1
Nacional	2–2	2–0	1–1	1–1	1–1	4–4	3–2	2–3	—	4–0	2–2	4–1	1–2	2–1
Caldas	1–1	0–0	0–1	4–1	3–0	2–1	1–2	1–2	0–0	—	1–1	1–2	2–4	1–2
Pereira	1–1	2–2	0–0	2–0	3–3	1–2	2–5	0–0	0–3	3–1	—	0–0	2–3	2–1
Quindío	3–1	3–3	1–1	1–0	1–1	2–1	2–3	1–3	1–1	2–1	1–0	—	1–2	1–0
Santa Fe	2–0	7–1	1–1	1–1	2–1	1–0	1–4	3–6	4–1	3–3	1–1	2–2	—	2–0
Tolima	4–4	1–0	0–0	0–2	0–4	2–2	1–1	2–3	0–2	3–5	0–0	1–1	0–0	—

=== Matchdays 27-52 ===
_{Home}\^{Away}	AME	BUC	CAL	CUC	JUN	MAG	DIM	MIL	NAC	ONC	PER	QUI	SFE	TOL
América	—	5–2	0–3	1–1	3–1	2–2	2–0	1–1	1–1	2–1	0–2	3–2	3–1	4–0
Bucaramanga	1–1	—	1–2	1–0	0–2	2–2	0–0	1–0	1–0	1–0	1–2	1–0	1–0	5–0
Cali	1–1	2–0	—	2–1	6–1	2–1	1–0	3–3	2–0	1–0	3–1	1–0	2–0	1–0
Cúcuta	2–0	2–0	1–3	—	1–1	1–0	2–2	0–0	2–1	3–0	3–0	1–1	1–1	3–1
Junior	2–1	1–0	0–1	3–1	—	2–0	3–0	2–1	1–0	4–2	1–1	0–1	3–0	3–0
Magdalena	4–0	1–1	0–0	2–2	1–4	—	3–0	3–3	2–2	1–2	6–4	4–2	0–2	0–0
Medellín	0–4	0–2	1–2	2–1	1–1	2–1	—	0–2	1–1	1–0	0–2	1–1	1–1	3–3
Millonarios	2–0	3–1	2–1	3–1	3–1	4–1	2–0	—	2–0	3–1	0–1	5–3	3–4	3–0
Nacional	2–2	2–1	0–1	3–0	1–3	3–2	2–3	1–1	—	0–0	1–3	1–1	3–0	2–1
Caldas	0–3	2–2	2–1	4–2	1–2	0–2	1–1	2–0	4–1	—	1–1	2–2	1–1	4–1
Pereira	0–0	4–1	1–1	1–1	2–1	1–1	3–0	1–1	1–1	4–0	—	4–2	3–1	1–1
Quindío	0–1	1–3	0–0	3–1	2–1	2–2	2–0	3–2	3–1	1–2	2–1	—	0–0	3–1
Santa Fe	1–1	0–1	2–3	1–2	2–3	3–2	2–0	1–1	1–2	1–0	2–2	2–0	—	6–0
Tolima	0–3	1–1	2–1	0–0	1–0	4–4	0–1	1–1	1–0	0–5	2–2	1–0	2–1	—
