= Jairo Arboleda =

Colombian footballer (born 1947)

Personal information
- Full name: Oscar Jairo Arboleda
- Date of birth: 20 September 1947 (age 79)
- Place of birth: Tuluá, Colombia
- Height: 1.71 m (5 ft 7 in)
- Position: Attacking midfielder

Senior career*
Years	Team	Apps	(Gls)
1968–1969	Deportivo Pereira		
1970–1972	Deportivo Cali		
1973	Deportivo Pereira		
1974–1978	Deportivo Cali		
1979–1980	Portuguesa		
1981	Cristal Caldas		
1982	Deportes Quindío		

International career
1975–1976	Colombia	7	(0)
- * Club domestic league appearances and goals

Oscar Jairo Arboleda (born 20 September 1947) is a Colombian former footballer who played as an attacking midfielder.

== Career ==
Born in Tuluá, Arboleda played for Deportivo Pereira, Deportivo Cali, Portuguesa, Cristal Caldas and Deportes Quindío.

He made 7 international appearances for Colombia, between 1975 and 1976.
