= Henry Caicedo =

Colombian footballer (1951–2023)

Personal information
- Full name: Henry Caicedo González
- Date of birth: 18 July 1951
- Place of birth: Cali, Colombia
- Date of death: 18 January 2023 (aged 71)
- Position: Centre-back

International career
Years	Team	Apps	(Gls)
1973–1977	Colombia	11	(0)

Henry Caicedo González (18 July 1951 – 18 January 2023) was a Colombian footballer who played as a centre-back. He played in eleven matches for the Colombia national team from 1973 to 1977.

Caicedo died from complications of a stroke on 18 January 2023, at the age of 71.
