= Fernando Castro (Colombian footballer) =

Colombian footballer (born 1949)

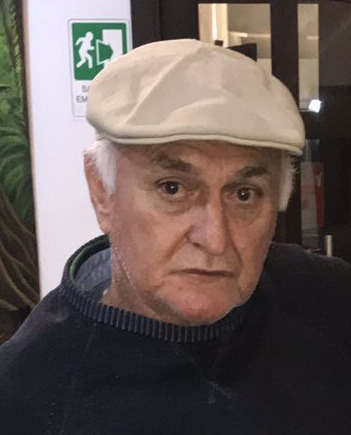

Personal information
- Full name: Fernando Castro Lozada
- Date of birth: 11 February 1949 (age 77)
- Place of birth: Manizales, Caldas, Colombia
- Height: 1.78 m (5 ft 10 in)
- Position: Defender

Team information
- Current team: América de Cali

Senior career*
Years	Team	Apps	(Gls)
1967–1974	Once Caldas		
1975–1976	Deportes Quindío		
1977–1981	Deportivo Cali		
1982	Santa Fe		
1983–1984	Once Caldas		

International career
1979–1981	Colombia	15	(0)

Managerial career
- 1987: Deportes Quindío
- 1989: Deportes Quindío
- 1991: Cúcuta Deportivo
- 1993–1994: Envigado
- 1995–1996: Deportivo Cali
- 1998: Independiente Medellín
- 1999–2001: Santa Fe
- 2002: Deportivo Cali
- 2002–2003: América de Cali
- 2005: Millonarios
- 2007: Once Caldas
- 2008: Santa Fe
- 2010–2012: Deportes Quindío
- 2014: Atlético Huila
- 2015–2016: Deportivo Cali
- 2017: Atlético Bucaramanga
- 2018–2019: América de Cali
- * Club domestic league appearances and goals

Fernando "Pecoso" Castro Lozada (born 11 February 1949) is a Colombian football manager and former player. He has won two Primera A titles as a manager, most recently in 2015 with Deportivo Cali. He most recently managed América de Cali in the Colombian Categoría Primera A.

== Career ==
Castro obtained his first win working as the technical director of Deportivo Cali, in the 1995/96 season; with them he broke a bad series of 22 years without wins for the team "Azucarero".

Later, "El Pecoso" (Freckle Face) stood out in his work for another big name of Colombian football, Independiente Santa Fe, the club that he directed from 1999 to 2001. In the 2000 season, he took the team to the championship finals, contending the title against the América de Cali (eventual champions), Junior of Barranquilla and Sports Tolima.

Castro also directed América de Cali from 2002 to 2003. This was a team with which he had a big campaign in the 2003 Copa Libertadores, leading the "Escarlata" to the semi-finals, in which the team was knocked out by the Boca Juniors of Argentina (eventually the champions).

In his second stage as the head of "Los Cardenales", in spite of having an exceptional performance in the Tournament Opening, serious differences with the surroundings of the club motivated his exit in 2008. He was replaced by the coach Hernán Darío Gómez.

In the second semester of 2010 he signed a contract with the Deportes Quindío team, and in spite of his economic limitations and staff to run an acceptable campaign, he brought the team to the quadrangular semi-finals of the tournament of that year. After the 2011 and 2012 seasons, he was not able to make any remarkable achievements, and he was driven to his dismissal due to economic problems, constant payroll cuts, and differences with the board of directors and some players.

Five days into the 2014 season's closing tournament, Castro took control of the Atlético Huila, replacing the technical director Virgilio Puerto, who had been fired from the team due to bad results. Under his control for the rest of the competition, Atlético Huila recorded six victories, five ties and one defeat, achieving a total of 23 points in front of the four teams before they changed technical directors, which put them in the quadrangular tournament semi-finals. During the quadrangular semi-finals, against the leader of the first Independiente Santa Fe phase and the current champions Atlético Nacional, Castro's Atlético Huila gained 11 points. They had the possibility to compete in the finals but five minutes before the end of the last game, the Independiente Santa Fe were able to tie the game and surpass them in points only for having occupied a higher position in the first phase of the tournament.

After having finalized his commitments with Atlético Huila, he terminated his agreement with the club in December 2014 so he could be hired for the 2015 season by Deportivo Cali, the team that had returned like a helmsman after 12 years. His return to the Deportivo Cali was marked by a brief controversy due to contractual disputes with his old club, since the huilense team did not arrive at an agreement with the Deportivo Cali to cease the agreement that Castro had until June 2015. Due to all this, he was banished from the field at the start of the league game, and had to direct from the grandstand until the legal lawsuit was resolved. After remaining in third place in the confrontation phase between all the teams of the 2015 tournament opening, the Deportivo Cali, directed by Castro, moved to the second phase of the competition, where they were able to surpass Atlético Nacional, resulting in their instant elimination in the quarter-finals. Playing against Millonarios in the semi-final resulted in facing Deportivo Independiente Medellín for the title, where they would win and achieve the ninth title for Deportivo Cali and the second title in his professional career.

The trainer from Manizales has also headed to the teams Cúcuta Deportivo, Envigado FC, Independent Medellín, Millonarios and Once Caldas, but he has not had as much success with these groups.

== Colombia National Football Team ==
With the Colombia national team he played 15 international games. He played 7 friendly games, 4 games in the America Cup 1979 and 4 eliminatory games in 1981.

== Clubs ==
=== As a player ===
Club	Country	Year
Once Caldas	Colombia	1967–1974
Deportes Quindío	Colombia	1975–1976
Deportivo Cali	Colombia	1977–1981
Santa Fe	Colombia	1982
Once Caldas	Colombia	1983–1984

=== As a coach ===
Club	Country	Year
Deportes Quindío	Colombia	1987
Deportes Quindío	Colombia	1989
Cúcuta Deportivo	Colombia	1991
Envigado	Colombia	1993–1994
Deportivo Cali	Colombia	1995–1996
Independiente Medellín	Colombia	1998
Santa Fe	Colombia	1999–2001
Deportivo Cali	Colombia	2002
América de Cali	Colombia	2002–2003
Millonarios	Colombia	2005
Once Caldas	Colombia	2007
Santa Fe	Colombia	2008
Deportes Quindío	Colombia	2010–2012
Atlético Huila	Colombia	2014
Deportivo Cali	Colombia	2015–2016
Atlético Bucaramanga	Colombia	2017
América de Cali	Colombia	2018 - currently

== Honours ==
=== As manager ===
Deportivo Cali

- Categoría Primera A: 1995–96, 2015
