= Deportivo Cali =

Association football club in Colombia

- Full name: Club Profesional Deportivo Cali S.A.
- Nicknames: Los Verdiblancos (The Green-Whites); Los Azucareros (The Sugarmakers); La Amenaza Verde (The Green Menace); El Glorioso (The Glorious)
- Founded: 23 November 1912; 113 years ago as The Cali Football Club
- Ground: Deportivo Cali
- Capacity: 42,000
- Owner(s): IDC Network (85%); Minority shareholders (15%)
- President: Joaquín Losada Fina
- Head coach: Rafael Dudamel
- League: Categoría Primera A
- 2025: Primera A, 15th of 20
- Website: deportivocali.com.co
Home colours	Away colours	Third colours

Club Profesional Deportivo Cali S.A., best known as Deportivo Cali, is a Colombian sports club based in Cali, most notable for its football team, which currently competes in the Categoría Primera A.

Deportivo Cali is one of the most successful football teams in Colombia, having won ten domestic league championships, one Copa Colombia and one Superliga Colombiana, for a total of twelve titles. Their stadium, Estadio Deportivo Cali, with an original capacity of 61,890, is the largest football stadium in Colombia, but has recently seen reductions in capacity due to renovations.

Deportivo Cali was also the first Colombian team to reach the Copa Libertadores final in 1978, and in 2016, Forbes listed Deportivo Cali as the 36th most valuable football team of the Americas. It is also the only Colombian football club that owns its own stadium, and was the only club in Colombia to be owned by its fans until its takeover by the Guatemalan investment group IDC Network in 2025. Following a process of conversion to a public limited company carried out between 2024 and 2025, IDC Network owns 85% of the club's shares, while the former club members (Asociación Deportivo Cali) and other minority shareholders kept the remaining 15%.

== History ==
=== Amateur era ===
The club's first logo, established in 1912.

Cali Football Club was formed in 1908 by students under the leadership of Nazario Lalinde, Juan Pablo Lalinde and Fidel Lalinde, who came back from Europe bringing football to the city of Cali, but in 1912 the students under the leadership of the three Lalinde brothers organized the team and renamed it as Deportivo Cali beginning practice under their first coach, Catalan born Francisco Villa Bisa.

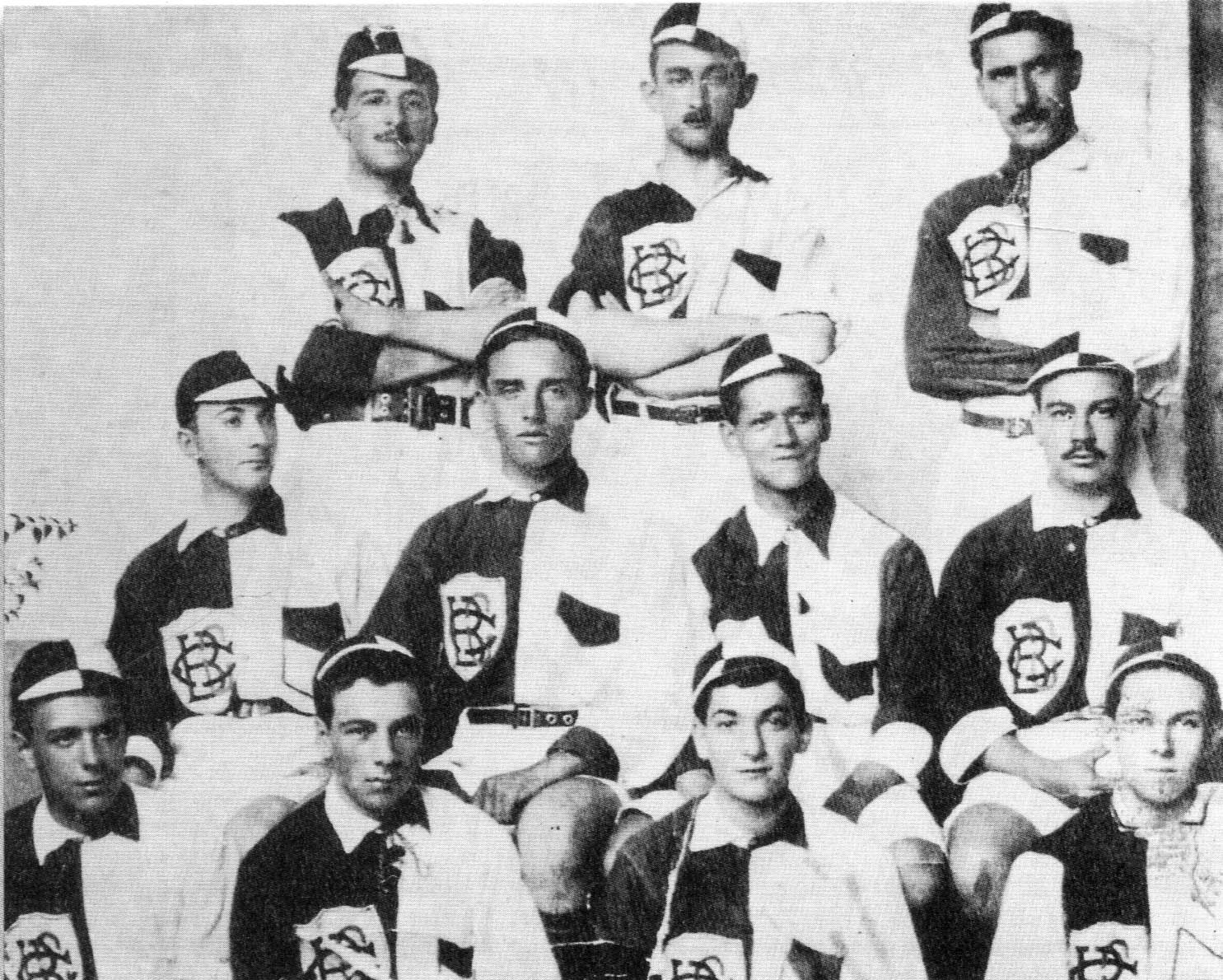
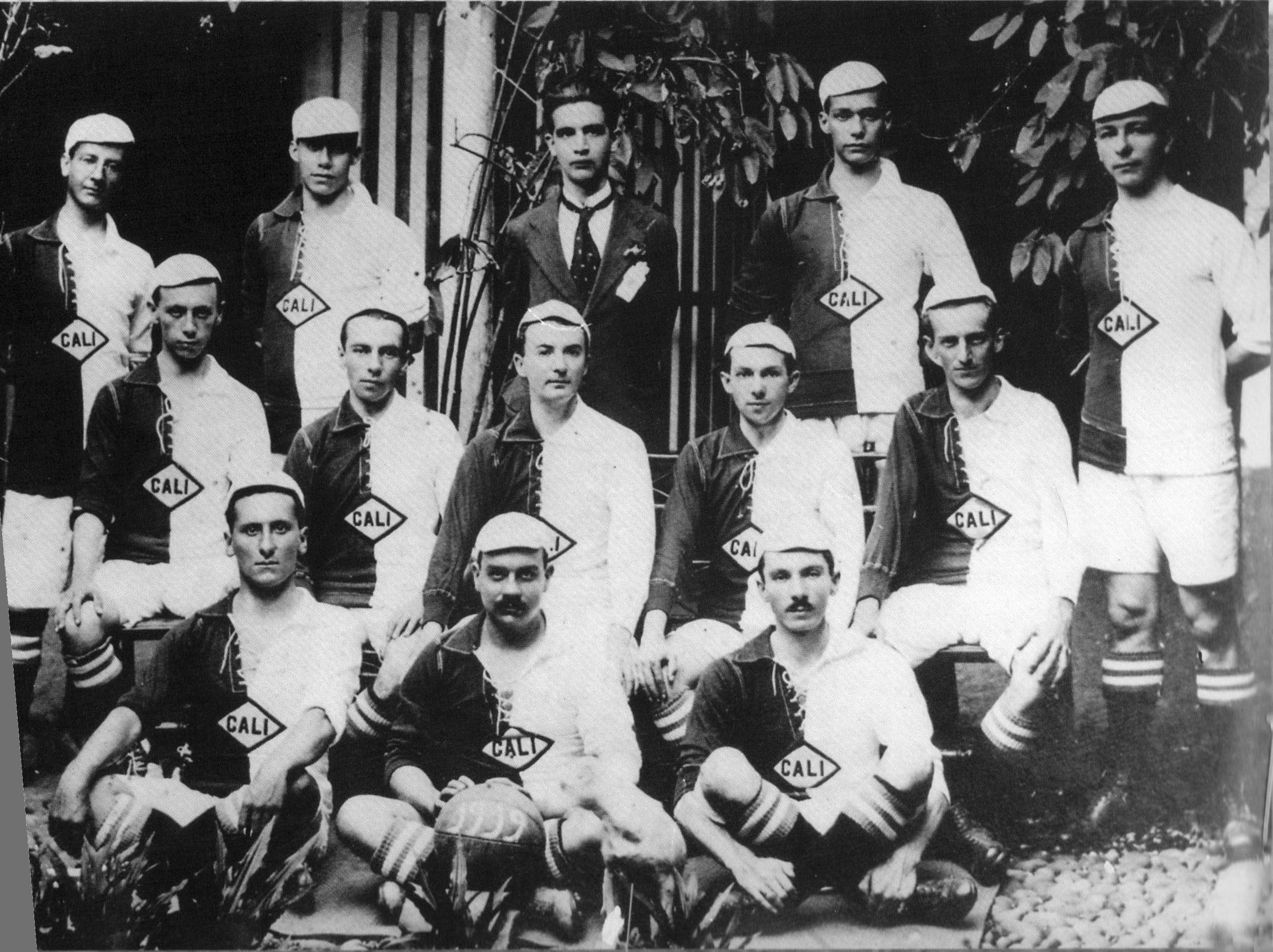
Two teams of Deportivo Cali "B", from left to right: 1914 and 1919.

Their first match was between CFC "A" and CFC "B" in the Versailles pitch, with 300 spectators in attendance. By 1928 the name was changed to "Deportivo Cali A" and the club represented the Valle del Cauca Department in the National Games, earning the titles between 1928 and 1930.

In 1945 several clubs decided to become part of the club adding new sports to the institution such as athletics, basketball, and swimming. During the next several years the club played against teams from the country and by 1948 the team was ready to play its first professional season in the newly created national league.

=== Early professional era ===
Deportivo Cali's first game in the Colombian professional league was a defeat against Junior in Barranquilla by a 2–0 score, and their first match at home was a 2–2 draw against Deportes Caldas. After losing 3–2 against Millonarios in Bogotá, their first victory came in the fourth match against Atlético Nacional (then Atlético Municipal) by a 4–1 score. They would end the season in eighth place with a record of 6 victories, 4 draws and 8 defeats. In 1949 the businessman and sugar tycoon of the Valle del Cauca region Carlos Sarmiento Lora became club chairman, and driven by his personal affinity with Peruvian football he recruited several footballers from that country such as Máximo "Vides" Mosquera, Guillermo Barbadillo, Valeriano López, Víctor Pasalaqua, Eliseo Morales, Luis "Tigrillo" Salazar, Manuel Drago and Manuel García, who were complemented by the Argentines Luis Ferreyra, Manuel Giúdice, and Ricardo "Tanque" Ruiz (who was with the team since the previous year), along with Peruvian coach Adelfo Magallanes. Forwards Mosquera, Barbadillo and López went on to form and lead what became known as the Rodillo Negro (Black Roller). With them, Deportivo Cali went on to establish a 18-match unbeaten streak in the 1949 league championship which allowed them to end up tied in points with Millonarios, forcing a tiebreaker final series to decide the champion. Deportivo Cali ended as league runners-up for the first time after losing both matches of the series (3–2 in Bogotá and 1–0 in Cali). For the following season, manager Magallanes left for crosstown rivals América and was replaced by Carlos Peucelle. Deportivo Cali finished third in the league that year and repeated that placement in the following season. In the remaining years of the El Dorado period the club began a decline, placing fourth in 1952, sixth in 1953, and ninth in 1954.

=== 1955–1959: Withdrawal and hiatus ===
Deportivo Cali ended the 1955 championship in last place and with huge debts which convinced its board of directors that continue playing in the league was not feasible, which led to the club's withdrawal from the league in 1956. Since this withdrawal was made without prior notice to Dimayor and with the club still owing money to the governing body, Deportivo Cali's affiliation (ficha) was revoked and its players were released.

By that time Colombian football had entered a period of crisis, and other clubs were also feeling the aftermath of the end of the El Dorado era. One of those was Boca Juniors de Cali, who had requested permission from Dimayor to sit out of the 1958 league championship but had paid its debts, which enabled it to keep their affiliation rights for the duration of its hiatus, leaving América as the sole Cali representative in the competition, but as they also announced their intention not to participate in the 1959 championship, a move was started to revive Deportivo Cali, which was led by Alex Gorayeb. Gorayeb, who was financially backed by the Colombian Lebanese colony, convinced several football executives of the time to participate, and requested permission from Deportivo Cali's last board of directors to represent them at Dimayor in order to claim back the club's revoked affiliation rights. Although they granted Gorayeb permission to meet with Dimayor as their representative, they did not wish to involve themselves with the club again.

With that authorization, Alex Gorayeb appointed Alberto Bitar and Jorge González as Deportivo Cali's delegates to the Assembly of Dimayor held at the end of 1958, although without voice or vote. The Dimayor executives, led by José Chalela as president, were greatly interested in the return of Deportivo Cali, given the crisis and disappearances of several clubs at the time, but a ruling issued in previous years stated that no city could have more than two teams in the league, meaning that for Deportivo Cali to rejoin the league, it would be needed that at least one of Boca Juniors or América did not participate in the tournament. In addition to that, the affiliation rights previously held by the club had been revoked due to their withdrawal and debts, therefore they would need to enter the tournament with the rights of another club. However, Aníbal Aguirre Arias, who still held the rights to Boca Juniors's affiliation and had the chance to rejoin the league after his club's two-year hiatus, opted not to exercise that right and instead allowed Deportivo Cali to return to the league using Boca Juniors's affiliation rights, which was approved by Dimayor. The executives led by Gorayeb refounded the club as Asociación Deportivo Cali, paid the debts still held with Dimayor and formed a team to participate in the league championship. Deportivo Cali played their first match under the new administration on 22 February 1959, defeating Independiente Medellín 1–0 in a friendly at the Estadio Olímpico Pascual Guerrero, and on 10 March played their first match in the league, beating Atlético Bucaramanga 3–1 at home.

=== Golden years ===
In 1962, Deportivo Cali was granted legal status by the Valle del Cauca government. For that year's league championship, the club signed the Argentine footballers Miguel Ángel Baiocco, Roberto Miravelli, Hugo Sgrimaglia, and the Colombian Hermán "Cuca" Aceros, with which Deportivo Cali scored over 100 goals in a league campaign for the first time. However, they once again ended the season as runners-up to Millonarios. In this season, they also recorded their biggest win, as well as one of the biggest wins in league history, thrashing Deportivo Pereira 9–0.

Deportivo Cali won their first league title in 1965. For that campaign, the Argentine Francisco "Pancho" Villegas arrived as manager after coaching Cúcuta Deportivo in the previous season, along with players such as Iroldo Rodríguez, Jorge Ramírez Gallego, Óscar López, Joaquín Sánchez, Bernardo "Cunda" Valencia, among others. The team was not off to a good start, having collected two wins, one draw, and three losses in the first six matches of the campaign. However, they were able to stage a comeback during the second half of the season which allowed them to take the lead ahead of the final stretch, moving three points clear of Deportivo Pereira. One of the most remembered matches of the campaign was a 3–2 derby win against América in which they were able to bounce back from a 2–0 deficit with only five minutes left in the match. Deportivo Cali were able to clinch the title with one match to go after defeating Cúcuta Deportivo 3–1 away on 12 December, and were presented the trophy on the final day of the season despite a 2–0 loss to América.

Between 1965 and 1974 Deportivo Cali saw its golden era. During this period Deportivo Cali won five of their ten Colombian championship titles, adding to their 1965 championship the ones in 1967, 1969, 1970, and 1974, while also ending as runners-up to Unión Magdalena in 1968 and Millonarios in 1972. With this Deportivo Cali became one of the top teams from the Colombian national league, along with Bogotá sides Millonarios and Santa Fe which had won most of the championships played until then. It was also during this time period that Deportivo Cali had many of the best players to come across the Colombian football league. Players such as José Rosendo Toledo, "El Moño" Muñoz, Miguel Escobar, Óscar López, Mario Sanclemente, German "El Burrito" González, Jose Yudica, Miguel Ángel "El Mago" Loayza, Jairo "El Maestro" Arboleda, Mario "Tranvía" Desiderio, Diego Edison Umaña, Henry "La Mosca" Caicedo, Iroldo Rodríguez, Jorge Ramírez Gallego, Roberto Álvarez, Quarentinha, Bernardo "Cunda" Valencia, and Ricardo Pegnoty were part of the team during its most successful era. Unfortunately, most of these players did not receive international fame, yet Jairo Arboleda could have been one of the best players Colombia has had in midfield along with Carlos "El Pibe" Valderrama. Similar to Valderrama, Arboleda used a variety of skill and "magic" that left opponents lost and beaten, which gave rise to his nickname "El Maestro" (The Master). He is mostly recognized in Cali as one of Colombia's best players ever. Arboleda was unfortunate to be called to the Colombia national football team at a time when the team was not fully developed and organized, largely preventing him from showing away his skill at an international level.

Although after the 1974 championship Deportivo Cali began a 22-year title drought in the domestic league, the team remained relatively competitive in the immediately following years, finishing third in 1975, and claiming back-to-back runner-up finishes in 1976, 1977, and 1978. In the 1975 Copa Libertadores, Deportivo Cali claimed its first victories against Brazilian teams in the competition, defeating Cruzeiro and Vasco da Gama at home, although that was not enough to reach the semifinal stage of the tournament, whilst in the 1977 edition of the continental tournament they won a first stage group that also involved Atlético Nacional as well as Bolivian sides Bolívar and Oriente Petrolero, but ended second to the eventual champions Boca Juniors in their semifinal group.

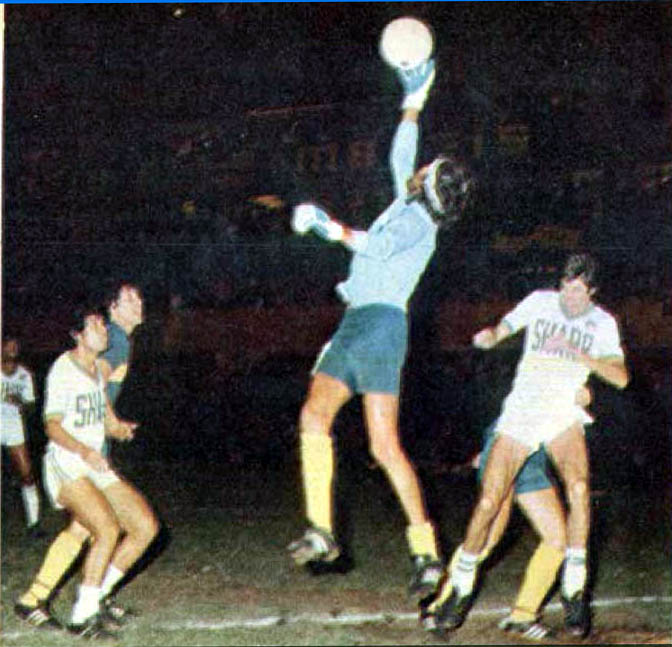
Deportivo Cali played the 1978 Copa Libertadores final against Boca Juniors.

In 1978 Deportivo Cali became the first Colombian club to reach the Copa Libertadores finals, with Carlos Bilardo as manager. Having qualified for the competition as the Colombian league runners-up of the previous season, they played in Group 4 against the Colombian champions Junior as well as Uruguayan sides Peñarol and Danubio. Deportivo Cali advanced out of the group with 8 points, after collecting two scoreless draws against Junior, two wins against Peñarol, and a win and a defeat against Danubio. In the semifinals, Deportivo Cali faced Cerro Porteño from Paraguay and Peruvian side Alianza Lima, advancing to the finals with a 4–0 win in Paraguay and only dropping points at home to Cerro Porteño in their second semifinal match. In the finals they faced the defending champions Boca Juniors, ultimately losing the series after a scoreless draw at home and a 4–0 defeat at La Bombonera.

=== The 1980s: Title drought and back-to-back runners-up to the crosstown rival ===
Whilst Deportivo Cali achieved yet another runner-up finish in 1980, and claimed an iconic win against River Plate at Estadio Monumental in the 1981 Copa Libertadores which knocked the Argentine side out of the competition, the decade of the 1980s saw the accentuation of the club's relative decline in the Colombian football panorama, as well as the emergence and consolidation of América de Cali and Atlético Nacional as Colombian football powers. Although América dominated the first half of the decade by winning five straight league championships and Deportivo Cali began to fall behind in championship titles, both crosstown rivals decided the league title in 1985 and 1986.

In 1985, Deportivo Cali finished fourth in the Apertura tournament after losing a playoff series against América, with which they claimed a 0.25 bonus for the final stages of the season, whilst in the Finalización they chained an 8-match unbeaten streak twice to finish second in the tournament and claim an additional 0.75 bonus, which allowed them to head into the final octagonal with 1 bonus point. In the final stage of the tournament, they found themselves in second place behind Millonarios at halfway point, after beating Atlético Bucaramanga, Junior, Atlético Nacional, América, and Unión Magdalena, and losing to Millonarios and Independiente Medellín. However, the team's performance declined in the final stretch, after drawing with Atlético Bucaramanga, Junior, and Millonarios, and losing a critical derby to América. Although wins over Atlético Nacional and Unión Magdalena helped the team end tied in points with América, the latter side's higher season bonus ultimately left Deportivo Cali as season runners-up.

In the following season, Deportivo Cali struggled early into the season since they had to play simultaneously the domestic tournament as well as the Copa Libertadores with a short roster, being knocked out of the latter competition in the first stage after finishing as runners-up to América in their group. In the Apertura tournament, Deportivo Cali placed fourth in their group with 13 points after winning 5 matches, drawing 3 and losing 6, whilst in the Finalización they ended in fourth place with 21 points, being awarded 0.25 bonus points and advancing to the final octagonal in which they faced Millonarios, Once Caldas, Atlético Nacional, Deportes Quindío, Junior, Independiente Medellín, and América. Although the team began the final stages with a loss to Millonarios in Bogotá, they bounced back with four straight wins against Once Caldas, Nacional, Quindío and Junior, streak that was cut after losing 2–1 to América. A fifth win against Medellín allowed Deportivo Cali to reach halfway point in second place. Although wins over Millonarios, Nacional, Quindío, and Junior helped the team keep their chances to win the title, another defeat at the hands of their crosstown rivals América (3–1) ended up deciding the title in favor of the latter team, with Deportivo Cali confirming yet another runner-up finish by winning their final match in Medellín. Deportivo Cali and América also had an intense head-to-head in the 1987 Copa Libertadores, tying for first place in their group with 8 points and the same number of goals scored and conceded. A tiebreaker match was played to decide which side would advance to the following round, which Deportivo Cali lost on penalty kicks.

The key players for Deportivo Cali at the time were Carlos "El Pibe" Valderrama and Bernardo Redín, none of whom was able to win a title with the club. Following those two consecutive runner-up finishes, Deportivo Cali moved away from title contention and did not have many remarkable campaigns in the domestic league for the following 10 years, the best one being a third-place finish in 1992.

=== 1996–1999: Return to positions of privilege ===
In 1996, the club broke a 22-year domestic title drought under the guidance of coach Fernando "El Pecoso" Castro, and with goalkeeper Miguel "El Show" Calero, midfielder Edison "Guigo" Mafla and strikers Víctor Bonilla, Walter Escobar, and Hamilton Ricard as outstanding players in the campaign. In the 1995–96 season, the team topped both the Apertura and Finalización tournaments as well as the season's aggregate table, earning the highest possible bonus (4 points) for the final stages. The team's lowest point of the campaign came at the semi-finals, in which they only won two matches, drew one, and lost the remaining three, advancing to the final round of the competition thanks to the bonus points awarded in the previous stages. In the championship round, they faced América de Cali, Atlético Nacional, and Millonarios, collecting seven points from their first three matches after drawing with Nacional and defeating the other two group rivals. Although they later lost to Millonarios in Bogotá, the title was clinched after a scoreless draw with crosstown rivals América on the last matchday of the championship round, which ensured the team would end ahead of Millonarios on bonus points. Two months prior to that final game, former club chairman Alex Gorayeb died aboard a flight between Cali and Miami.

Two years later and with José Eugenio "Cheché" Hernández as manager, Deportivo Cali won its seventh title. Cheché, who was managing a team for the first time, replaced Reinaldo Rueda at the helm after he left midway into the season due to Cali's subpar performances, and managed to stage a comeback that allowed the team to advance to the semi-finals after finishing eighth in the Finalización tournament, and later went on to win a semi-final group that once again featured Atlético Nacional, Millonarios, and América de Cali as rivals. This qualified the team for the finals against Once Caldas, which had been the best team of the previous stages of the season and were heavily favored to win the title. Deportivo Cali won 4–0 in the first leg in Cali with a hat-trick scored by Víctor Bonilla and tied 0–0 in Manizales in the second leg in order to claim the title. In that year, the team also took part for the first and only time in the Copa Merconorte, reaching the finals in which they were defeated by Atlético Nacional.

Deportivo Cali qualified for the 1999 Copa Libertadores as Colombian champions, and qualified out of a group which also included Once Caldas, and Argentine sides River Plate and Vélez Sarsfield. After eliminating Colo-Colo in the round of 16, Uruguayan side Bella Vista in the quarter-finals and Cerro Porteño in the semi-finals, they reached the final of the competition for the second time in history. Unfortunately, luck was not on their side and they lost to Brazilian side Palmeiras on penalties after winning the first leg in Cali 1–0 and losing 2–1 in the return leg in São Paulo. Venezuelan goalkeeper Rafael Dudamel, defenders Hernán Gaviria, Mario Yepes, and Gerardo Bedoya, and midfielders Arley Betancourt, Mayer Candelo, and Martín Zapata were some of the most important players of the club in both the 1998 national championship and the Copa Libertadores run the following year.

=== Dawn of the 21st century: ups and downs ===
In the start of the 21st century, the club saw a major downfall in quality of players, quality of team and general managers, and overall results in both the domestic league and international competition. On 24 October 2002, players Herman Gaviria and Giovanni Córdoba were hit by lightning during a training session with the team. Gaviria was killed instantly, though he was not pronounced dead until arriving at Valle del Lilí Hospital, while Córdoba died three days later. At the time, the team was leading the 2002 Finalización and was heavily favored to win the title but was unable to recover from this event and ended in second place of its semifinal group, behind eventual champions Independiente Medellín. During this timeframe, Cali won its eighth domestic championship in the 2005 Finalización tournament after beating Real Cartagena in the finals, with Hugo Rodallega as joint top scorer of the tournament, and other outstanding players such as Panamanian striker Blas Pérez and midfielder Ricardo Ciciliano, but also lost finals to underdog teams such as Deportes Tolima and Deportivo Pasto in the 2003 Finalización and 2006 Apertura tournaments, respectively.

Performances in international competition were also mixed during this time, although they reached the round of 16 in the 2003 Copa Libertadores and the quarter-finals the following year, in the 2006 Copa Libertadores the team failed to make it out of the group stage after only being able to collect one point out of 18. A poor campaign during the 2007 Finalización as a result of the major injury of Sergio Herrera and the departure of Martin Cardetti caused Deportivo Cali to fail to qualify for the semifinal stage of the domestic league for the first time since short tournaments began awarding Colombian football league titles. Between 2006 and 2007, the club saw over three coaches, and two of them in the 2007 Finalización season alone. The coaches who served Deportivo Cali during this time were Pedro Sarmiento, who won the league with the team as coach in 2005 and was dismissed after losing the 2006 Apertura finals to Deportivo Pasto, Omar Labruna and Néstor Otero.

Uruguayan José Daniel Carreño took the reins ahead of the 2008 season, replacing Néstor Otero. Deportivo Cali, during his management, had an above average Apertura, coming in sixth place which qualified them for the semifinals of the tournament. In the Copa Colombia, the club ended in third place of its group and failed to qualify for further play, which was considered as an embarrassment as Deportivo Cali was the favorite to win the group. During the semifinals of the Apertura, Cali failed to win the first four matches, losing two and tying the remaining two. After failing to win the fourth game (a 2–0 loss to Deportes Quindío at home), Carreño was sacked and replaced by caretaker manager Ricardo Martínez, who managed the team until the end of the 2008 season and qualified it for the 2009 Copa Sudamericana, in which they were knocked out in the first stage by Universidad de Chile. The 2009 season saw Deportivo Cali qualifying for the semifinals of the Apertura tournament in the return of Cheché Hernández to the club but missing out on the finals on goal difference after being held to a draw at home by the eventual finalists Junior on the final matchday, while in the Finalización tournament they failed to qualify for the semifinals.

In 2010, Deportivo Cali failed to qualify for the final rounds of both the Apertura and the Finalización, but was able to win the Copa Colombia for the first time in history under the management of Jaime de la Pava. Los Azucareros managed to win their regional group and then defeated Junior, Santa Fe, and La Equidad in their run to the final, where they faced surprise package Itagüí Ditaires. Deportivo Cali won both legs of the final, 1–0 in Itagüí and 2–0 at the Estadio Deportivo Cali, which also hosted its first official match that year with a 2–0 victory over Deportes Quindío on 21 February.

In the 2011 Apertura, and despite having one of their worst starts in history by losing the first four games of the season, Deportivo Cali managed to make it to the quarterfinals, where they were eliminated in a penalty shoot-out by eventual champions Atlético Nacional in a match that could have gone either way. Deportivo Cali also competed in the 2011 Copa Sudamericana but were knocked out by Santa Fe on penalties, while in the Torneo Finalización they were unable to qualify for the semifinals. The 2012 season, in which the club celebrated its 100th anniversary, brought similar fortunes: the team qualified for the Apertura semifinals but narrowly missed out on the berth to the final, which ended up going to Deportivo Pasto, and in the Torneo Finalización they were placed in 11th place, thus failing to qualify for the semifinals.

After the disappointing close to the 2012 season, Deportivo Cali signed Leonel Álvarez as their new head coach on 13 December 2012. He led Deportivo Cali to the play-offs in both of the tournaments played in 2013, reaching the final of the Torneo Finalización, but losing it to Atlético Nacional. The first leg was played on home soil resulting in a scoreless draw, while the second leg ended in a 2–0 loss. Deportivo Cali would go on to win the 2014 Superliga Colombiana against the same rival, however, Álvarez was fired after a poor start in the 2014 Apertura, while in the Copa Libertadores Deportivo Cali placed last in their group. Starting from that season, and with the promotion of Héctor Cárdenas to first team manager, the club focused on relying on players newly promoted from its youth ranks.

=== 2015–2021: Pecoso's kindergarten and the return of former champions ===
In recent years, the club has become stronger with the formation of young players. In 2015, and with Fernando "Pecoso" Castro as head coach, Cali won the Torneo Apertura and reached the quarter-finals of the Torneo Finalización with a squad formed mostly by youth footballers promoted from the club's youth setup, which became known as El kínder del Pecoso (Pecoso's kindergarten). That year, the goalscorer of the team was 21-year old Harold Preciado with 25 goals, followed by 20-year old Rafael Santos Borré with 11 goals and 22-year old Miguel Murillo with 10 goals. Other notable young player in the campaign was 22-year old Andrés Felipe Roa, who scored Deportivo Cali's deciding goal in the league finals against Independiente Medellín and was called up for the senior team and also played the Olympic Games play-off against United States along with his fellow mates Luis Manuel Orejuela and Kevin Balanta. For the 2016 season, the average age of the squad was 22.8 with 17 players under 21. However, the squad's youth played against them in the 2016 Copa Libertadores as the team crashed out of the competition in the group stage without winning a single match and being on the receiving end of thrashings in all of their away matches. Deportivo Cali reached another final series in the 2017 Apertura tournament, once again losing to Atlético Nacional after winning the first leg 2–0 at their stadium and losing 5–1 in the return leg played in Medellín, while in 2019 they were knocked out in the semifinal stage of both the Apertura and Finalización tournaments and lost the Copa Colombia finals to Independiente Medellín.

In 2021, Deportivo Cali won their tenth league title after six years. In the Torneo Apertura, they managed to advance to the knockout stages, losing to Deportes Tolima in the quarter-finals. Their Finalización campaign started with a 2–1 away victory against Santa Fe, however, a subsequent string of poor results caused the dismissal of manager Alfredo Arias midway into the tournament. Former Venezuelan goalkeeper Rafael Dudamel, who was champion with the team as player in 1998 took over, losing the derby to América de Cali in his debut. However, the team's performance improved, and a winning streak of four matches in the final stretch of the first stage helped them qualify for the semi-finals in seventh place. Deportivo Cali were drawn with Atlético Nacional, Junior, and Deportivo Pereira in their semi-final group, clinching qualification for the finals with one match in hand and a 2–0 win against Junior at home. In the finals, they faced Deportes Tolima, in a rematch of the quarter-final series of the previous tournament as well as the 2003 Finalización tournament finals. The first leg, played at the Estadio Deportivo Cali ended in a 1–1 draw, whilst in the second leg played in Ibagué they came from behind to win the game 2–1 and clinch the Primera A title. Harold Preciado, who also returned to the team after winning the league title in 2015 and scored two goals in the final series against Tolima, ended as the tournament's top scorer with 13 goals.

=== Financial crisis and takeover by IDC Network ===
Following the 2021 league championship, the club entered a financial crisis when it was revealed in July 2022 that its liabilities amounted to over 90 billion Colombian pesos (approximately 20 million US dollars) given that during 2016 and 2017 the club's operating and salary costs increased without generating the expected income from player transfers, situation which was further aggravated by the impact of the COVID-19 pandemic on the income of football clubs. By the end of 2023, the club's debt rose to 110 billion pesos, which led it to request its admission to a restructuring process before the Superintendency of Companies of Colombia in order to meet its obligations to creditors, which was confirmed by the entity in June 2024.

The financial crisis also impacted the performance on the field, as the team finished the 2022 season placing second-from-last in the aggregate table, and only advanced to the final stages of the championship in the 2023 Finalización. As a result of the poor campaigns in these seasons, Deportivo Cali began to be at risk of relegation starting from the 2024 season. Moreover, the club began to default on payments to its players' salaries, accumulating up to two and three months of arrears and also failing to pay bonuses and social security contributions, as denounced by the Colombian footballers' union Acolfutpro.

At the request of the club's members, a forensic audit was conducted at the end of 2024, which uncovered irregularities in aspects such as the acquisition of land near Estadio Deportivo Cali for the construction of parking lots, loans from external companies linked to club executives, the transfer of club assets as collateral for debt payments, and irregular commissions for player transfers. Furthermore, irregularities were found in 14 out of 31 transfer transactions carried out between 2010 and 2022 and reviewed by the audit, and no evidence of approval by the club's executive committee was found in ten cases.

Given the severity of the crisis, Deportivo Cali began the process to convert from an association to a public limited company in order to allow the entry of investors who would inject resources into the club. In June 2025, it was reported that Deportivo Cali had reached an agreement with IDC Network, a Guatemalan investment group who would initially make an economic investment of approximately 10 million dollars to cover the club's obligations and subsequently acquire it with the approval of the club's members. On 22 August 2025 IDC Network, represented by investors Richard Lee and Beatriz Carbonell, officially presented its proposal to the club's associate members in an assembly, seeking to acquire 85% of Deportivo Cali for 47.5 million dollars. According to its offer, IDC, who were already involved in partnerships with Leeds United and Racing de Santander, would assume the payment of liabilities and the execution of payment agreements with the institution's creditors, while also reserving 10 million dollars for future investments in the club, including a real estate development around Estadio Deportivo Cali. That same day, Deportivo Cali's associate members voted to approve the conversion of the club into a public limited company, also accepting the investment proposal submitted by IDC Network. In October 2025, the Superintendency of Companies of Colombia approved the debt restructuring agreement reached by Deportivo Cali and its creditors for the payment of 106 billion pesos over a period of 10 years, paving the way for the club's conversion and the entry of IDC Network as investors.

The takeover by IDC Network was finalised on 19 November 2025, when the former association's board led by Humberto Arias Bejarano handed over the club's administration to the new board of directors led by Guatemalan football executive Rafael Tinoco, a few days after the club was registered as a public limited company before the Chamber of Commerce of Cali under the name Club Profesional Deportivo Cali S.A.

== Crest history ==
=== Crest evolution ===
1912–16

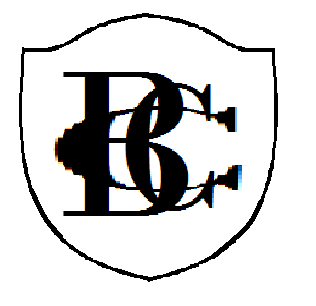
1916–26

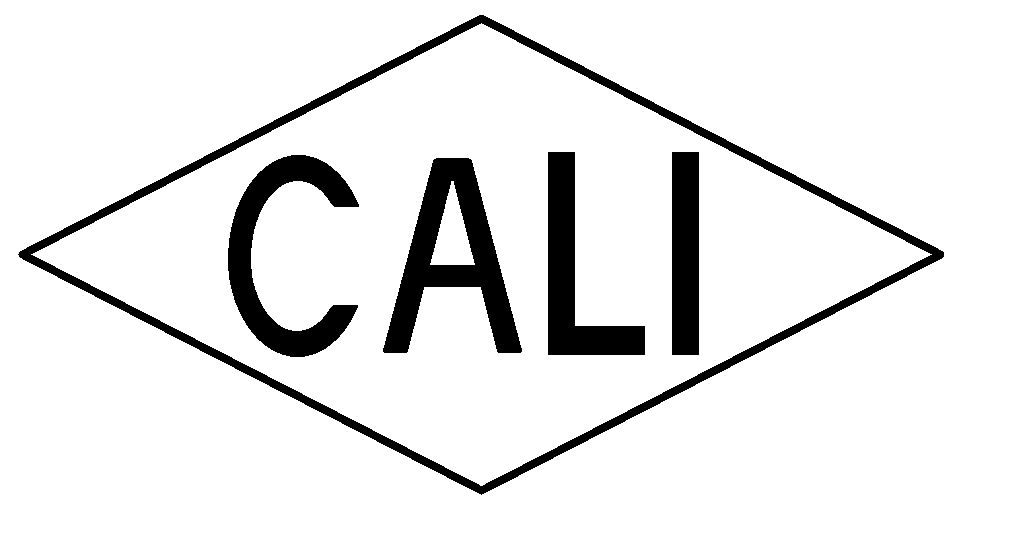
1926–48

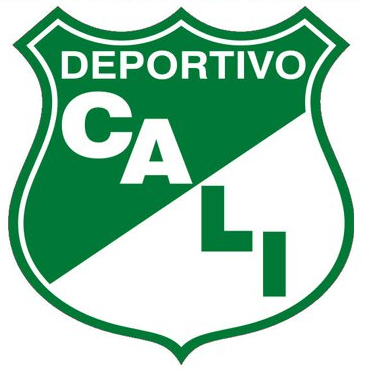
1948–2012

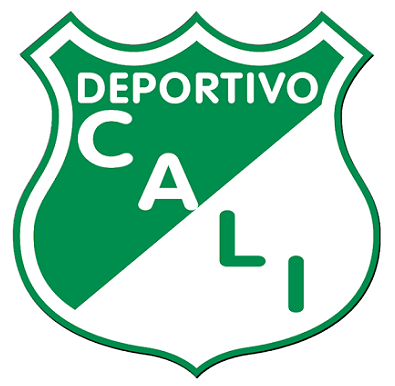
2012–present

== Rivalries ==
=== Clásico Vallecaucano ===
Deportivo Cali's longtime rival is América de Cali. The derby is known either as the "Clásico Vallecaucano" (Valle del Cauca Derby) or the "Clásico de San Fernando" because of the location of the Pascual Guerrero stadium. The first derby was played in 1931 when the final of the Valle del Cauca league was disputed by the two teams. The result was a 1–0 victory for Deportivo Cali. The first derby in the professional era was played in 1948. The first leg was a victory for América 1–0 while in the second leg of the tournament it was a 4–3 victory for Deportivo Cali.

On 10 October 2010 Deportivo Cali and América de Cali played the first derby at the former's new stadium, which was won by Deportivo Cali 6–3 including a hat trick from Argentine player Martin Morel, and three of the most highlighted goals of the tournament. The Derby was not played in the top flight between 2012 and 2016 because of América de Cali's relegation at the end of the 2011 season, however, it kept being played in the Copa Colombia as both teams were drawn together in that competition.

- Total matches played: 317
  - Deportivo Cali Victories: 119
  - América de Cali Victories: 97
  - Draws: 101

=== Clásico Añejo ===
Deportivo Cali also has a rivalry with Millonarios, which is known as the Clásico añejo (Vintage classic) since it was the first rivalry other than the regional derbies to be recognized as such in Colombian football. The two sides played a tiebreaker series to decide the 1949 Campeonato Profesional champion, which ended up being Millonarios, and the rivalry was intensified in the 1960s and 1970s as Deportivo Cali began winning league titles and challenging Millonarios. Both sides have ended in the top two places of the league 10 times, and have also placed in the top two places of the all-time table of the Categoría Primera A, which as of 2022 was still led by Millonarios, with Deportivo Cali having been surpassed for second place by Atlético Nacional. Although the rise and consolidation of Atlético Nacional and América de Cali starting from the 1980s has caused interest in this rivalry to decline somewhat, it is still considered an important match in Colombian football.

== Supporters ==
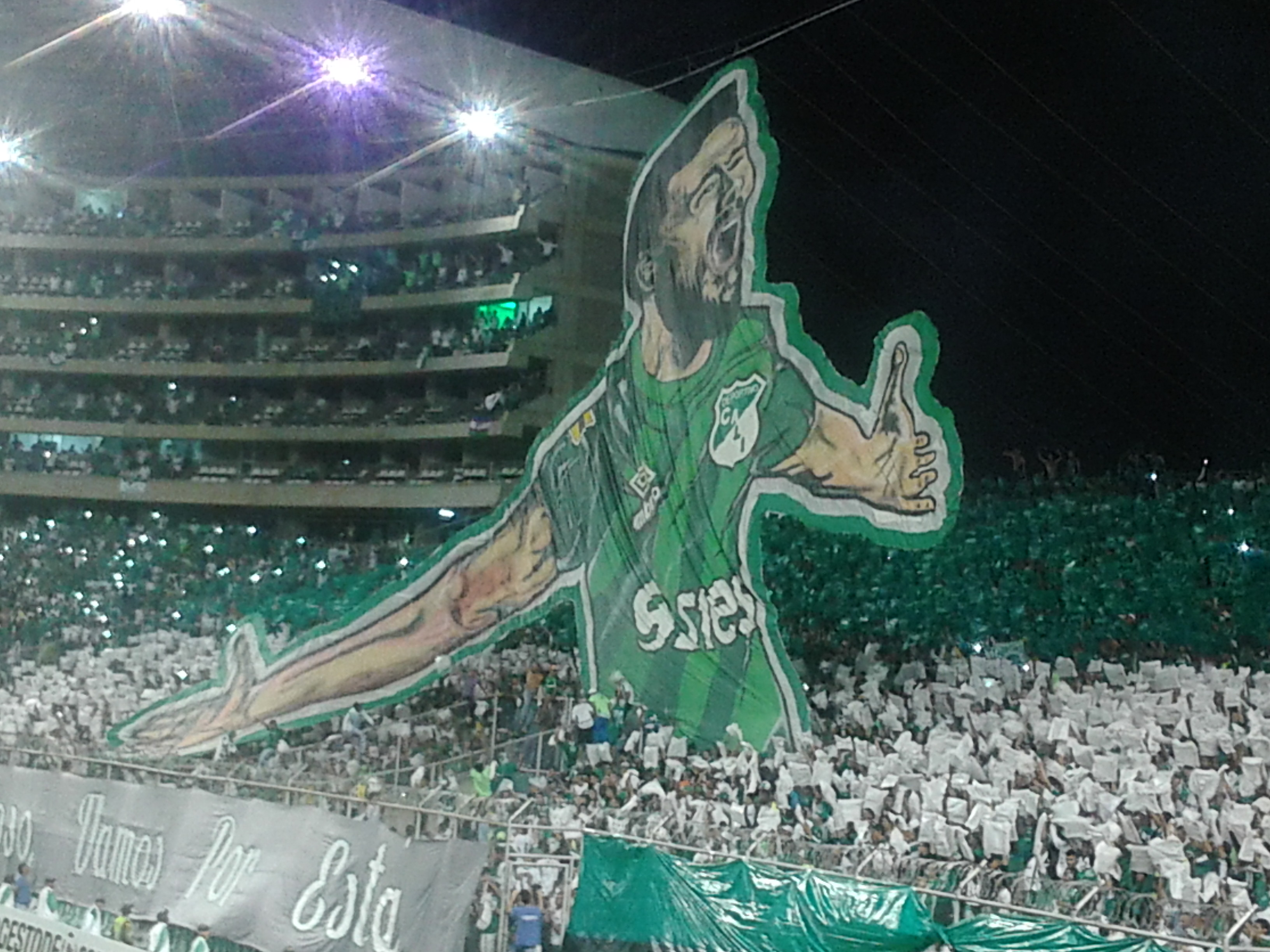
Tifo depicting Andrés Pérez by Frente Radical Verdiblanco prior to a match in 2016.

As one of Colombia's most traditional and successful clubs, Deportivo Cali has one of the largest fanbases in the country. Their main supporters group is known as Frente Radical Verdiblanco, an ultras group founded in 1992 which is divided into factions, most of them from Cali but also from other neighboring towns and cities, and usually stand in the southern stand of Estadio Deportivo Cali. They are known for their undying support of the club, as well as practicing hooliganism and frequently engage in fighting with fanbases of other clubs, particularly with the fans of América de Cali and Independiente Medellín, with whom they have been involved in several violent incidents. The group is known as one of the most dangerous in South America. Other recognized supporter groups are Avalancha Verde Norte and Horda Combativa, both of which stand at the northern stand of the stadium.

In recent years, Deportivo Cali has become one of the clubs topping the stadium attendance rankings in Categoría Primera A, averaging nearly 15,000 fans per home match in the 2023 and 2024 seasons. For the 2026 season, the club sold all 10,000 season tickets available.

== Stadium ==
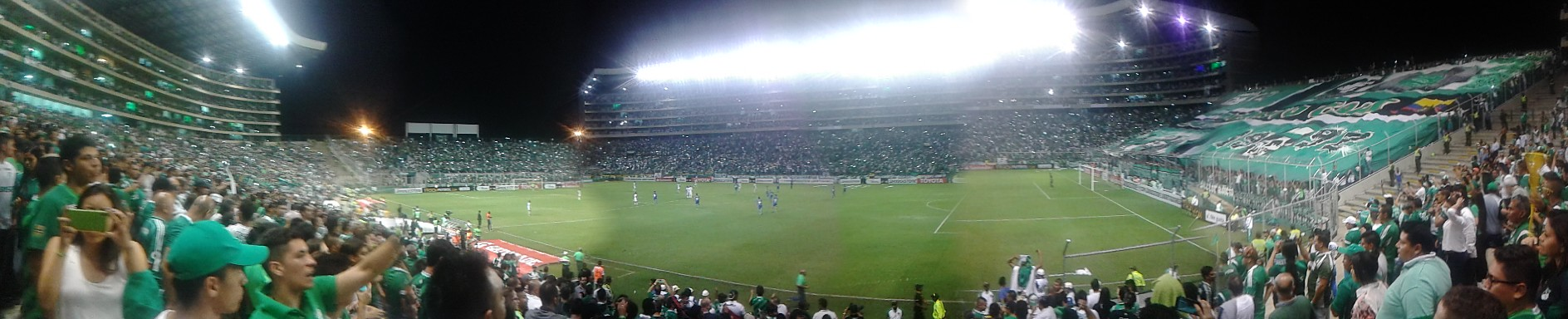
Panoramic view of Estadio Deportivo Cali in 2016.

Until 2014, Deportivo Cali played their home matches at Estadio Pascual Guerrero in Cali, which had a capacity of 43,000 and was shared with crosstown rivals América. Although Estadio Deportivo Cali was opened in 2008 with a friendly match against Ecuadorian team LDU Quito and the club played some games there on a temporary basis due to renovations made to Estadio Pascual Guerrero for the 2011 FIFA U-20 World Cup, they moved into their stadium on a permanent basis starting from the 2015 season. Estadio Deportivo Cali, also known as Estadio de Palmaseca, is located in Palmira, in the outskirts of Cali. When it opened, it had a capacity of 52,000, but renovations brought it down to 44,000. The stadium makes Deportivo Cali the only club in Colombia that owns its stadium.

== Honours ==
Deportivo Cali honours
Type	Competition	Titles	Seasons
Domestic	Categoría Primera A	10	1965, 1967, 1969, 1970, 1974, 1995–96, 1998, 2005–II, 2015–I, 2021–II
Domestic	Copa Colombia	1	2010
Domestic	Superliga Colombiana	1	2014
Regional	Campeonato Departamental	1	1935

- record
- ^{s} shared record

=== Runner-up finishes ===
- Categoría Primera A
  - Runners-up (14): 1949, 1962, 1968, 1972, 1976, 1977, 1978, 1980, 1985, 1986, 2003–II, 2006–I, 2013–II, 2017–I
- Copa Colombia
  - Runners-up (2): 1981, 2019
- Superliga Colombiana
  - Runners-up (2): 2016, 2022
- Copa Libertadores
  - Runners-up (2): 1978, 1999
- Copa Merconorte
  - Runners-up (1): 1998

== Players ==
=== Current squad ===
As of 24 September 2026

Note: Flags indicate national team as defined under FIFA eligibility rules; some limited exceptions apply. Players may hold more than one non-FIFA nationality.

No.	Pos.	Nation	Player
1	GK	PER	Pedro Gallese
2	DF	COL	José Moya
4	DF	COL	Fernando Álvarez
5	MF	COL	Gustavo Cuéllar (captain)
8	MF	COL	Daniel Giraldo
9	FW	ARG	Juan Dinenno
10	MF	ARG	Emanuel Reynoso (on loan from Talleres de Córdoba)
12	DF	COL	José Caldera
13	MF	COL	Ronaldo Pájaro
14	FW	COL	Alexis Manyoma (on loan from Estudiantes (LP))
15	DF	COL	Leyser Chaverra (on loan from Independiente Medellín)
16	DF	COL	Keimer Sandoval
18	FW	COL	Avilés Hurtado
19	MF	COL	Johan Martínez (on loan from Itagüí Leones)
20	FW	VEN	Eduard Bello (on loan from Atlético Nacional)

No.	Pos.	Nation	Player
21	MF	COL	Nicolás Benedetti
23	FW	COL	Stiven Rodríguez (on loan from Junior)
24	DF	COL	Kalazán Suárez (on loan from Inter Palmira)
26	DF	COL	Juan José Tello
27	DF	COL	Fabián Viáfara
28	DF	COL	Edwin Velasco
30	MF	COL	Joan Gómez
32	GK	COL	Alejandro Rojo
34	DF	COL	Juan Gómez Miranda
35	DF	COL	Santiago Vallecilla
36	MF	COL	Miguel Correa (on loan from Atlético Nacional)
38	GK	COL	Alejandro Rodríguez
41	DF	COL	Mateo Benítez
43	MF	COL	Santiago Martínez
70	FW	COL	Carlos Bacca

=== Out on loan ===
Note: Flags indicate national team as defined under FIFA eligibility rules; some limited exceptions apply. Players may hold more than one non-FIFA nationality.

No.	Pos.	Nation	Player
—	DF	COL	Jhon Barreiro (at Orsomarso)
—	DF	COL	Isaac Venecia (at Atlético Ávila)
—	MF	COL	Daniel Mantilla (at Llaneros)
—	MF	COL	Juan José Montoya (at Itagüí Leones)
—	MF	COL	Ronald Rodallega (at Inter Palmira)

No.	Pos.	Nation	Player
—	FW	COL	Juan Manuel Arango (at Bogotá)
—	FW	COL	Jhon Cabal (at Sportivo Bella Italia)
—	FW	COL	Kleiton Cuéllar (at Real Cundinamarca)
—	FW	COL	Jean Galindo (at Atlético Cali)
—	FW	COL	Jaider Moreno (at Inter Palmira)

=== World Cup players ===
The following players were chosen to represent their country at the FIFA World Cup while contracted to Deportivo Cali.

- (Colombia) Germán Aceros (1962)
- (Paraguay) Buenaventura Ferreira (1986)
- (Paraguay) Jorge Amado Nunes (1986)
- (Colombia) Bernardo Redín (1990)
- (Colombia) John Wilmar Pérez (1998)
- (Uruguay) Juan Guillermo Castillo (2010)
- (Colombia) Faryd Mondragón (2014)
- (Colombia) Abel Aguilar (2018)
- (Colombia) Camilo Vargas (2018)

=== Notable players ===
- (Argentina) Ernesto Álvarez
- (Argentina) Alberto de Jesús Benítez
- (Argentina) Abel Da Graca
- (Argentina) Rubén Darío Insúa
- (Argentina) Martín Morel
- (Argentina) Cristian Nasuti
- (Argentina) Rubén Ponce de León
- (Argentina) José Sand
- (Argentina) Néstor Scotta
- (Argentina) José Rosendo Toledo
- (Chile) Jorge Aravena
- (Chile) Jaime Riveros
- (Colombia) Abel Aguilar
- (Colombia) Adolfo Andrade
- (Colombia) Jairo Arboleda
- (Colombia) Arley Betancourt
- (Colombia) Víctor Bonilla
- (Colombia) Rafael Santos Borré
- (Colombia) Henry Caicedo
- (Colombia) Miguel Calero
- (Colombia) Oswaldo Calero
- (Colombia) Mayer Candelo
- (Colombia) Fernando Castro
- (Colombia) Óscar Córdoba
- (Colombia) Álvaro Domínguez
- (Colombia) Walter Escobar
- (Colombia) Andrés Estrada
- (Colombia) Carlos Estrada
- (Colombia) Frank Fabra
- (Colombia) Hermán Gaviria
- (Colombia) Teófilo Gutiérrez
- (Colombia) Giovanni Hernández
- (Colombia) Carlos Mario Hoyos
- (Colombia) Jhon Kennedy Hurtado
- (Colombia) Edison Mafla
- (Colombia) Faryd Mondragón
- (Colombia) Fredy Montero
- (Colombia) Tressor Moreno
- (Colombia) Luis Muriel
- (Colombia) Elkin Murillo
- (Colombia) Jeison Murillo
- (Colombia) Jámison Olave
- (Colombia) Willington Ortiz
- (Colombia) Armando Osma
- (Colombia) Ever Palacios
- (Colombia) Helibelton Palacios
- (Colombia) Oscar Pareja
- (Colombia) Andrés Pérez
- (Colombia) John Wilmar Pérez
- (Colombia) Harold Preciado
- (Colombia) Jorge Ramírez Gallego
- (Colombia) Bernardo Redín
- (Colombia) Hamilton Ricard
- (Colombia) Nelson Rivas
- (Colombia) Hugo Rodallega
- (Colombia) Ángel María Torres
- (Colombia) Diego Umaña
- (Colombia) Carlos Valderrama
- (Colombia) Camilo Vargas
- (Colombia) Alexander Viveros
- (Colombia) Mario Yepes
- (Colombia) Cristian Zapata
- (Colombia) Pedro Zape
- (Panama) Blas Pérez
- (Paraguay) Arístides del Puerto
- (Paraguay) Darío Caballero
- (Paraguay) Roberto Fernández
- (Paraguay) Buenaventura Ferreira
- (Paraguay) Jorge Amado Nunes
- (Peru) Miguel Ángel Loayza
- (Peru) Valeriano López
- (Uruguay) Guillermo de Amores
- (Uruguay) Ernesto Hernández
- (Uruguay) Juan Castillo
- (Uruguay) Juan Salaberry
- (Venezuela) Rafael Dudamel

== Women ==
Deportivo Cali Femenino is the women's football section of Deportivo Cali and they currently play in the Colombian Women's Football League, the top level women's football league in Colombia. Founded in 2019, the club is one of four to have won the Colombian women's football league, winning the title in 2021, 2024, 2025 and 2026, as well as having one runner-up finish in 2022, and placing fourth at the 2022 Copa Libertadores Femenina and runner-up in the continental tournament three years later.
