= Edison Mafla =

Colombian footballer (born 1974)

Personal information
- Full name: Edison Mafla Peña
- Date of birth: 19 December 1973 (age 52)
- Place of birth: Florida, Colombia
- Position: Midfielder

Senior career*
Years	Team	Apps	(Gls)
1991–1998	Deportivo Cali	263	(109)
1997–1998	→ Villarreal (loan)	1	(0)
1999	Club Universidad de Chile	8	(1)
1999	Deportivo Cali	12	(3)
2000	Independiente Santa Fe	40	(13)
2001–2002	América de Cali	74	(21)
2003	Alianza Lima	?	(?)
2003	Aucas	?	(?)
2004	Cortuluá	0	(0)

International career
1996–1999	Colombia	8	(1)
- * Club domestic league appearances and goals

Edison Mafla (born August 14, 1974) is a Colombian former footballer who played for clubs in Colombia, Spain, Peru and Chile.
