= Jorge Gallego =

Colombian footballer (1940–2026)

Personal information
- Full name: Jorge Enrique Ramírez Gallego
- Date of birth: 25 March 1940
- Place of birth: Cali, Colombia
- Date of death: 4 September 2026 (aged 86)
- Place of death: Cali, Colombia
- Position: Forward

Senior career*
Years	Team	Apps	(Gls)
1962–1964	Millonarios	16	(6)
1964	Quindío	23	(15)
1965–1973	Deportivo Cali	329	(171)
1974–1975	Deportes Tolima	58	(19)
Total		441	(214)

International career
1966–1970	Colombia	14	(4)
- * Club domestic league appearances and goals

Jorge Enrique Ramírez Gallego (25 March 1940 – 4 September 2026) was a Colombian footballer who played as a forward. He is the all-time leading goal-scorer for Deportivo Cali and among the top five all-time goal-scorers in the Fútbol Profesional Colombiano.

== Career ==
Born in Cali, Gallego began his professional football career with Millonarios in 1962, where he won three league titles. He had a brief spell with Deportes Quindío before moving in 1965 to Deportivo Cali, where he scored 168 goals in nine seasons. He finished his playing career with Deportes Tolima in 1975.

Gallego made 14 appearances and scored four goals for the Colombia national team from 1966 to 1970.

== Death ==
Gallego died in Cali on 4 September 2026, at the age of 86.
