= 2026 Liga DIMAYOR =

Liga DIMAYOR football season

Liga BetPlay DIMAYOR
- Season: 2026
- Dates: 16 January – December 2026
- Champions: Apertura: Junior (12th title)
- Relegated: Boyacá Chicó; Jaguares
- Copa Libertadores: Junior; Atlético Nacional
- Matches: 398
- Goals: 993 (2.49 per match)
- Top goalscorer: Apertura: Andrey Estupiñán and Luis Muriel (13 goals each); Finalización: Luciano Pons and Yeison Guzmán (10 goals each)
- Biggest home win: América de Cali 7–0 Boyacá Chicó (2 August)
- Biggest away win: Junior 0–4 Atlético Nacional (10 March); Alianza 1–5 Atlético Nacional (29 August); Jaguares 0–4 Atlético Bucaramanga (8 November)
- Highest scoring: Atlético Nacional 7–1 Inter Bogotá (12 May)
- All statistics correct as of 21 November 2026.

The 2026 Liga DIMAYOR (officially known as the 2026 Liga BetPlay DIMAYOR for sponsorship purposes) is the 79th season of the first division league of Colombian football. The season began on 16 January and is scheduled to end in December 2026.

Two tournaments (Apertura and Finalización) are played in the season, each one of them being an independent championship. Junior entered the season as defending champions, having won the 2025 Finalización tournament, and claimed their twelfth league title in the Torneo Apertura, defeating Atlético Nacional 3–1 on aggregate in the finals.

== Format ==
The competition format for the season was determined at the Extraordinary Assembly of Dimayor, held on 10 and 11 December 2025. Due to the 2026 FIFA World Cup and the need to end the Torneo Apertura by 5 June 2026, the format proposed and eventually approved for the Torneo Apertura consisted in playing a round-robin first stage with 19 matchdays (without the extra regional derby matchday), with the top eight teams advancing to a final stage played as single-elimination playoffs instead of the semifinal group stage played in recent seasons, thus returning to the format last used in the 2021 Apertura tournament.

Unlike the Apertura, the Torneo Finalización was played under the usual format, with a round-robin first stage in which teams played each other once (with the same fixture as the Apertura's first stage but reversed home-and-away order) and the top eight teams from the first stage advancing to the following phase. Instead of play-offs, the eight qualified teams were drawn into two semi-final groups, with the two group winners advancing to play the tournament finals.

== Teams ==
Locations of the 2026 Liga DIMAYOR teams
Locations of the 2026 Liga DIMAYOR teams in Bogotá
Locations of the 2026 Liga DIMAYOR teams in Medellín

Twenty teams take part in the season, the top 18 teams in the relegation table of the previous season as well as the 2025 Torneo DIMAYOR champions Jaguares and Cúcuta Deportivo, who returned to the top flight after one year and six years, respectively. Both teams promoted after winning the season's short tournaments and securing the top two places of the aggregate table. The promoted teams replaced Envigado and Unión Magdalena, the bottom two teams in the relegation table of the 2025 season, who were relegated to the second tier after sixteen and one year in the top flight, respectively.

Starting from this season, La Equidad rebranded to Internacional de Bogotá, following the club's takeover by the Tylis-Porter Group in early 2025 and the decision by its former owners Seguros La Equidad to keep the name, symbols and colors to themselves. The club's new identity was officially presented on 10 December 2025.

=== Stadia and locations ===
Team	City	Stadium	Capacity
Águilas Doradas	Medellín	Cincuentenario (Note: Águilas Doradas play their home matches at Estadio Cincuentenario in Medellín due to the closure of their regular stadium Estadio Alberto Grisales in Rionegro for remodeling works.)	4,000
Alianza	Valledupar	Armando Maestre Pavajeau	11,000
América de Cali	Cali	Pascual Guerrero	38,588
Atlético Bucaramanga	Bucaramanga	Américo Montanini	28,000
Atlético Nacional	Medellín	Atanasio Girardot	44,863
Boyacá Chicó	Tunja	La Independencia	20,630
Cúcuta Deportivo	Cúcuta	General Santander	32,163
Deportes Tolima	Ibagué	Manuel Murillo Toro	28,100
Deportivo Cali	Palmira	Deportivo Cali	42,000
Deportivo Pasto	Pasto	Departamental Libertad	20,665
Deportivo Pereira (Note: Deportivo Pereira played their first four Torneo Apertura home matches at Estadio Centenario in Armenia due to remodeling works at their regular stadium Estadio Hernán Ramírez Villegas in Pereira. Starting from March and until the end of the Torneo Apertura, they moved to Estadio Santiago de las Atalayas in Yopal after incidents involving their fanbase led to the cancellation of their lease of Estadio Centenario. The club planned to return to Estadio Hernán Ramírez Villegas for the Torneo Finalización once the remodeling works at the stadium were concluded, but it was damaged as a result of the 2026 Colombia earthquake. Due to this, Deportivo Pereira had to play most of their home matches in the Finalización tournament in Palmira and Yopal, only being able to return to their stadium starting from 30 October.)	Pereira	Hernán Ramírez Villegas	30,297
Deportivo Pereira	Armenia	Centenario	23,500
Deportivo Pereira	Yopal	Santiago de las Atalayas	10,000
Deportivo Pereira	Palmira	Deportivo Cali	42,000
Fortaleza	Bogotá	Metropolitano de Techo	10,000
Independiente Medellín	Medellín	Atanasio Girardot	44,863
Internacional de Bogotá	Bogotá	Metropolitano de Techo	10,000
Jaguares	Montería	Jaraguay	12,000
Junior	Barranquilla	Metropolitano Roberto Meléndez	46,692
Junior	Barranquilla	Romelio Martínez (Note: Junior play their home matches at Estadio Romelio Martínez due to expansion works at their regular stadium Estadio Metropolitano Roberto Meléndez.)	8,600
Llaneros	Villavicencio	Bello Horizonte – Rey Pelé	15,000
Millonarios	Bogotá	Nemesio Camacho El Campín	39,512
Once Caldas	Manizales	Palogrande	31,611
Santa Fe	Bogotá	Nemesio Camacho El Campín	39,512

=== Personnel and kits ===
Team	Manager	Kit manufacturer	Main shirt sponsor(s)
Águilas Doradas	(Argentina) Flavio Robatto	Aerosport	Colanta, Pool
Alianza	(Colombia) Flabio Torres	Pin-Go	Gobernación del Cesar, Pool, Fundación Universitaria San Mateo
América de Cali	(Colombia) David González	Reebok	Cerveza Poker, BetPlay
Atlético Bucaramanga	(Uruguay) Pablo Peirano	Lotto	Financiera Comultrasan
Atlético Nacional	(Colombia) Lucas González	Nike	Betsson
Boyacá Chicó	(Colombia) Jhon Jaime Gómez	Geus	Pool
Cúcuta Deportivo	(Argentina) Nicolás Chiesa	Boman	Colanta
Deportes Tolima	(Colombia) Luis Fernando Suárez	Umbro	BetPlay, Pool, Mercacentro
Deportivo Cali	(Venezuela) Rafael Dudamel	Hillside	Wplay, Pastas La Muñeca
Deportivo Pasto	(Spain) Diego Merino	Boman	Aguardiente Nariño, Banco AV Villas, Pool
Deportivo Pereira	(Colombia) Alexis Márquez	Oto	
Fortaleza	(Colombia) Diego Arias	Roott+Co	Stake
Independiente Medellín	(Colombia) Luis Amaranto Perea	Adidas (Apertura); Reebok (Finalización)	Colanta, Wplay, Pool
Internacional de Bogotá	(Argentina) Ricardo Valiño	Umbro	Mastercard, BetPlay, TaDa, Bogotá
Jaguares	(Colombia) Julio Méndez (caretaker)	Kimo	Colanta, Pool
Junior	(Uruguay) Sebastián Viera	Adidas	BetPlay, Águila
Llaneros	(Colombia) Wilmer Sandoval (caretaker)	Aerosport	Maxi Cola, Aitabü Hotel Campestre, Gobernación del Meta
Millonarios	(Colombia) Alberto Gamero	Adidas	Cerveza Andina
Once Caldas	(Colombia) Carlos Valencia (caretaker)	Reebok	Colanta, BetPlay, Wakate
Santa Fe	(Uruguay) Pablo Repetto	Fila	Colanta, BetPlay, Pool

=== Managerial changes ===
Team	Outgoing manager	Manner of departure	Date of vacancy	Position in table	Incoming manager	Date of appointment
Torneo Apertura
Deportivo Pereira	(Colombia) Cristian Galíndez	End of caretaker spell	12 November 2025	Pre-season	(Colombia) Arturo Reyes	30 December 2025
Internacional de Bogotá	(Colombia) Daniel Gómez	End of caretaker spell	12 November 2025	Pre-season	(Argentina) Ricardo Valiño	21 December 2025
Deportivo Pasto	(Colombia) René Rosero	End of caretaker spell	13 November 2025	Pre-season	(Spain) Jonathan Risueño	1 December 2025
Jaguares	(Colombia) Álvaro Hernández	Resigned	24 November 2025	Pre-season	(Colombia) Alexis Márquez	28 November 2025
Águilas Doradas	(Spain) Jonathan Risueño	Resigned	26 November 2025	Pre-season	(Colombia) Juan David Niño	17 December 2025
Santa Fe	(Colombia) Francisco López (Colombia) Grigori Méndez	End of caretaker spell	8 December 2025	Pre-season	(Uruguay) Pablo Repetto	2 December 2025
Millonarios	(Colombia) Hernán Torres	Sacked	28 January 2026	20th	(Colombia) Omar Rodríguez (Note: Caretaker manager.)	29 January 2026
Millonarios	(Colombia) Omar Rodríguez	End of caretaker spell	2 February 2026	18th	(Argentina) Fabián Bustos	1 February 2026
Cúcuta Deportivo	(Colombia) Nelson Flórez	Sacked	3 February 2026	15th	(Venezuela) Richard Páez (Note: Braynner García was the caretaker manager for the Torneo Apertura round 5 match against Águilas Doradas on 7 February.)	5 February 2026
Jaguares	(Colombia) Alexis Márquez	Resigned	14 February 2026	14th	(Paraguay) Gustavo Florentín	16 February 2026
Boyacá Chicó	(Colombia) Flabio Torres	Sacked	16 February 2026	17th	(Colombia) Jhon Jaime Gómez (Note: Originally as caretaker manager, appointed on a permanent basis at the end of the Torneo Apertura.)	17 February 2026
Alianza	(Colombia) Hubert Bodhert	Sacked	17 February 2026	20th	(Colombia) Camilo Ayala	18 February 2026
Deportivo Cali	(Colombia) Alberto Gamero	Resigned	6 March 2026	10th	(Venezuela) Rafael Dudamel	9 March 2026
Jaguares	(Paraguay) Gustavo Florentín	Resigned	16 March 2026	16th	(Colombia) Julio Méndez	16 March 2026
Jaguares	(Colombia) Julio Méndez	End of caretaker spell	31 March 2026	18th	(Colombia) Hubert Bodhert	31 March 2026
Atlético Bucaramanga	(Colombia) Leonel Álvarez	Sacked	8 April 2026	12th	(Colombia) Wilbert Perea	9 April 2026
Independiente Medellín	(Colombia) Alejandro Restrepo	Sacked	21 April 2026	14th	(Colombia) Sebastián Botero	21 April 2026
Torneo Finalización
Independiente Medellín	(Colombia) Sebastián Botero	End of caretaker spell	2 June 2026	Pre-tournament	(Colombia) Luis Amaranto Perea	26 May 2026
Atlético Bucaramanga	(Colombia) Wilbert Perea	End of caretaker spell	27 May 2026	Pre-tournament	(Uruguay) Pablo Peirano	27 May 2026
Águilas Doradas	(Colombia) Juan David Niño	Mutual agreement	5 June 2026	Pre-tournament	(Argentina) Flavio Robatto	16 June 2026
Atlético Nacional	(Colombia) Diego Arias	Sacked	12 June 2026	Pre-tournament	(Colombia) Lucas González	27 June 2026
Deportes Tolima	(Colombia) Lucas González	Resigned	27 June 2026	Pre-tournament	(Colombia) Sebastián Oliveros	30 June 2026
Fortaleza	(Colombia) Sebastián Oliveros	Signed by Deportes Tolima	30 June 2026	Pre-tournament	(Colombia) Diego Arias	8 July 2026
Cúcuta Deportivo	(Venezuela) Richard Páez	Mutual agreement	9 August 2026	16th	(Argentina) Nicolás Chiesa	16 August 2026
Deportivo Pasto	(Spain) Jonathan Risueño	Sacked	24 August 2026	19th	(Colombia) René Rosero (Note: Originally as caretaker manager, appointed on a permanent basis on 29 August 2026.)	24 August 2026
Alianza	(Colombia) Camilo Ayala	Sacked	30 August 2026	18th	(Colombia) Leonardo Torres	30 August 2026
Junior	(Uruguay) Alfredo Arias	Sacked	31 August 2026	17th	(Uruguay) Sebastián Viera	1 September 2026
Millonarios	(Argentina) Fabián Bustos	Sacked	1 September 2026	5th	(Colombia) Omar Rodríguez	1 September 2026
Millonarios	(Colombia) Omar Rodríguez	End of caretaker spell	3 September 2026	5th	(Colombia) Alberto Gamero	3 September 2026
Alianza	(Colombia) Leonardo Torres	End of caretaker spell	4 September 2026	18th	(Colombia) Flabio Torres	4 September 2026
Once Caldas	(Colombia) Hernán Darío Herrera	Resigned	26 September 2026	10th	(Colombia) Carlos Valencia	26 September 2026
Jaguares	(Colombia) Hubert Bodhert	Sacked	28 September 2026	20th	(Colombia) Julio Méndez	28 September 2026
Deportes Tolima	(Colombia) Sebastián Oliveros	Sacked	28 September 2026	7th	(Colombia) Luis Fernando Suárez	28 September 2026
Deportivo Pereira	(Colombia) Arturo Reyes	Mutual agreement	5 October 2026	19th	(Colombia) Alexis Márquez	6 October 2026
Deportivo Pasto	(Colombia) René Rosero	Change of role	9 October 2026	18th	(Spain) Diego Merino	12 October 2026
Llaneros	(Colombia) José Luis García	Sacked	15 October 2026	12th	(Colombia) Wilmer Sandoval	15 October 2026

== Torneo Apertura ==
The Torneo Apertura, officially known as Liga BetPlay Dimayor 2026–I, was the 102nd first division football championship and the first tournament of the 2026 season. It began on 16 January and ended on 8 June 2026. The champions, Junior, qualified for the 2027 Copa Libertadores group stage.

=== First stage ===
==== Standings ====
Pos	Team	Pld	W	D	L	GF	GA	GD	Pts	Qualification
1	Atlético Nacional	19	13	1	5	35	15	+20	40	Advance to the knockout stage
2	Junior	19	11	2	6	31	24	+7	35	Advance to the knockout stage
3	Deportivo Pasto	19	10	4	5	29	25	+4	34	Advance to the knockout stage
4	América de Cali	19	10	3	6	25	15	+10	33	Advance to the knockout stage
5	Once Caldas	19	8	9	2	31	22	+9	33	Advance to the knockout stage
6	Deportes Tolima	19	8	7	4	27	17	+10	31	Advance to the knockout stage
7	Santa Fe	19	7	8	4	29	22	+7	29	Advance to the knockout stage
8	Internacional de Bogotá	19	7	7	5	26	26	0	28	Advance to the knockout stage
9	Deportivo Cali	19	7	6	6	20	16	+4	27	
10	Millonarios	19	7	5	7	31	23	+8	26	
11	Independiente Medellín	19	7	5	7	26	24	+2	26	
12	Águilas Doradas	19	7	5	7	20	25	−5	26	
13	Atlético Bucaramanga	19	5	8	6	26	20	+6	23	
14	Llaneros	19	4	10	5	17	20	−3	22	
15	Fortaleza	19	5	7	7	22	27	−5	22	
16	Jaguares	19	5	3	11	20	33	−13	18	
17	Alianza	19	3	8	8	13	27	−14	17	
18	Boyacá Chicó	19	5	2	12	15	32	−17	17	
19	Cúcuta Deportivo	19	3	7	9	22	35	−13	16	
20	Deportivo Pereira	19	1	7	11	15	32	−17	10	

Source: Dimayor, Soccerway
Rules for classification: 1) Points, 2) Goal difference, 3) Goals for, 4) Away goals for, 5) Goals against, 6) Away goals against, 7) Drawing of lots (or play-off matches, only if needed to decide eighth place).

==== Results ====
Home \ Away	AGU	ALI	AME	BUC	NAC	BOY	CUC	TOL	CAL	PAS	PER	FOR	DIM	IDB	JAG	JUN	LLA	MIL	ONC	SFE
Águilas Doradas	—	1–0	0–1	2–1	1–2	—	3–2	—	2–1	1–2	—	—	—	0–0	—	0–3	—	—	2–2	—
Alianza	—	—	0–3	—	—	1–1	1–1	—	1–0	0–0	—	—	0–1	—	1–0	—	—	2–2	1–1	—
América de Cali	—	—	—	2–0	—	—	—	1–1	—	—	1–0	—	—	3–0	3–0	—	0–0	3–1	1–1	1–0
Atlético Bucaramanga	—	5–0	—	—	—	5–0	—	0–0	0–0	—	3–0	—	—	—	2–2	—	—	2–1	1–1	1–2
Atlético Nacional	—	3–0	2–1	2–0	—	4–0	0–0	—	—	—	—	4–1	—	3–0	2–1	—	2–0	—	—	—
Boyacá Chicó	0–1	—	0–1	—	—	—	—	1–1	1–0	—	1–0	—	—	—	5–0	—	3–0	2–1	—	0–1
Cúcuta Deportivo	—	—	2–0	2–2	—	1–0	—	3–2	0–2	—	—	1–1	1–3	—	—	1–1	—	—	1–2	—
Deportes Tolima	4–1	2–0	—	—	1–0	—	—	—	1–1	—	2–0	2–0	—	—	3–1	—	0–1	—	2–1	2–2
Deportivo Cali	—	—	1–0	—	1–0	—	—	—	—	3–0	1–0	1–1	3–1	—	—	—	1–1	0–0	0–2	1–1
Deportivo Pasto	—	—	2–0	0–0	1–2	2–0	3–2	1–0	—	—	—	—	1–0	1–1	—	—	—	2–1	—	1–2
Deportivo Pereira	0–1	2–3	—	—	1–0	—	2–2	—	—	2–2	—	0–0	—	—	—	2–3	0–2	—	0–0	—
Fortaleza	2–0	1–0	1–2	2–1	—	2–1	—	—	—	1–2	—	—	—	1–1	2–1	—	1–1	—	—	1–1
Independiente Medellín	1–2	—	2–1	1–2	2–3	2–0	—	2–2	—	—	1–1	1–0	—	1–2	—	2–0	—	—	—	—
Internacional de Bogotá	—	2–1	—	0–0	—	4–0	2–1	0–0	3–2	—	2–2	—	—	—	—	0–1	—	3–2	—	—
Jaguares	1–1	—	—	—	—	—	2–0	—	1–0	2–3	1–0	—	1–2	2–3	—	0–2	—	1–0	—	3–1
Junior	—	1–1	2–1	2–0	0–4	3–0	—	0–2	1–2	4–3	—	2–1	—	—	—	—	2–0	—	—	—
Llaneros	1–1	0–0	—	1–1	—	—	2–2	—	—	0–1	—	—	2–2	1–1	2–0	—	—	—	1–1	—
Millonarios	1–0	—	—	—	3–0	—	2–0	2–0	—	—	5–1	2–2	0–0	—	—	1–2	2–1	—	—	1–1
Once Caldas	—	—	—	—	1–0	3–0	—	—	—	4–2	—	4–2	1–1	2–1	1–1	2–1	—	1–4	—	1–1
Santa Fe	1–1	1–1	—	—	1–2	—	5–0	—	—	—	2–2	—	2–1	3–1	—	2–1	0–1	—	—	—

Source: Dimayor, Soccerway
Legend: Blue = home team win; Yellow = draw; Red = away team win.

=== Knockout stage ===
For the knockout stage, teams were drawn into four ties with Atlético Nacional and Junior being seeded into the first and fourth one, respectively, for being the top two teams in the first stage of the tournament. Both seeded teams were granted home advantage for the quarter-finals and semi-finals, whilst the order of legs was drawn for the remaining two quarter-final ties.

==== Bracket ====
Quarter-finals
América de Cali	1	0	1
Santa Fe	1	4	5
Once Caldas	0	2	2
Junior	1	2	3
Deportes Tolima	1	2	3
Deportivo Pasto	0	0	0
Internacional de Bogotá	1	1	2
Atlético Nacional	2	7	9

Semi-finals
Santa Fe	1	0	1 (4)
Junior (p)	1	0	1 (5)
Deportes Tolima	0	1	1
Atlético Nacional	1	3	4

Finals
Junior	3	0	3
Atlético Nacional	0	1	1

==== Quarter-finals ====
Team 1	Agg.	Team 2	1st leg	2nd leg
Internacional de Bogotá	2–9	Atlético Nacional	1–2	1–7
Deportes Tolima	3–0	Deportivo Pasto	1–0	2–0
América de Cali	1–5	Santa Fe	1–1	0–4
Once Caldas	2–3	Junior	0–1	2–2

===== First leg =====
9 May 2026	Internacional de Bogotá	1–2	Atlético Nacional	Bogotá
16:00 UTC−5	Poveda 29'	Report	S. Zapata 34' (o.g.); Rengifo 68'	Stadium: Metropolitano de Techo; Referee: Carlos Betancur

9 May 2026	Deportes Tolima	1–0	Deportivo Pasto	Ibagué
18:10 UTC−5	Sandoval 41'	Report		Stadium: Manuel Murillo Toro; Referee: Wilmar Roldán

9 May 2026	América de Cali	1–1	Santa Fe	Cali
20:20 UTC−5	Ramos 47'	Report	Rodallega 7'	Stadium: Pascual Guerrero; Referee: Carlos Ortega

10 May 2026	Once Caldas	0–1	Junior	Manizales
18:10 UTC−5		Report	Paiva 43' (pen.)	Stadium: Palogrande; Referee: Luis Delgado

===== Second leg =====
12 May 2026	Atlético Nacional	7–1 (9–2 agg.)	Internacional de Bogotá	Medellín
18:20 UTC−5	García 40', 65'; M. Uribe 45+3'; Morelos 51'; Arango 72'; Cardona 78'; Sarmiento 82'	Report	Valencia 5'	Stadium: Atanasio Girardot; Referee: Carlos Ortega

12 May 2026	Santa Fe	4–0 (5–1 agg.)	América de Cali	Bogotá
20:30 UTC−5	Rodallega 34', 45+1' (pen.), 84'; Bustos 57'	Report		Stadium: El Campín; Referee: Jhon Ospina

13 May 2026	Deportivo Pasto	0–2 (0–3 agg.)	Deportes Tolima	Pasto
18:00 UTC−5		Report	González 30'; Torres 90+2'	Stadium: Departamental Libertad; Referee: Diego Ulloa

13 May 2026	Junior	2–2 (3–2 agg.)	Once Caldas	Barranquilla
20:15 UTC−5	Monzón 41'; Barrios 66'	Report	Gómez 15'; Monzón 85' (o.g.)	Stadium: Romelio Martínez; Referee: Carlos Betancur

==== Semi-finals ====
Team 1	Agg.	Team 2	1st leg	2nd leg
Deportes Tolima	1–4	Atlético Nacional	0–1	1–3
Santa Fe	1–1 (4–5 p)	Junior	1–1	0–0

===== First leg =====
16 May 2026	Deportes Tolima	0–1	Atlético Nacional	Ibagué
18:00 UTC−5		Report	Morelos 58'	Stadium: Manuel Murillo Toro; Referee: Andrés Rojas

16 May 2026	Santa Fe	1–1	Junior	Bogotá
20:30 UTC−5	Rodallega 84' (pen.)	Report	Scarpeta 38' (o.g.)	Stadium: El Campín; Referee: Wilmar Roldán

===== Second leg =====
23 May 2026	Atlético Nacional	3–1 (4–1 agg.)	Deportes Tolima	Medellín
18:00 UTC−5	Campuzano 53'; Román 71'; Cardona 77'	Report	Parra 79'	Stadium: Atanasio Girardot; Referee: Carlos Betancur

23 May 2026	Junior	0–0 (1–1 agg.) (5–4 p)	Santa Fe	Barranquilla
20:30 UTC−5		Report		Stadium: Romelio Martínez; Referee: Jairo Mayorga
	Penalties
	Muriel (penalty scored); Peña (penalty scored); Herrera (penalty scored); Ángel (penalty scored); Gutiérrez (penalty scored)		(penalty scored) Lovera; (penalty scored) Obrian; (penalty scored) Olivera; (penalty scored) J. Torres; (penalty missed) Rodallega

==== Finals ====
2 June 2026
19:30 UTC−5

Junior	3–0	Atlético Nacional
Castrillón 7'; Muriel 36', 53' (pen.)	Report

Estadio Romelio Martínez, Barranquilla
Referee: Carlos Ortega

8 June 2026
17:00 UTC−5

Atlético Nacional	1–0	Junior
Cardona 56'	Report

Estadio Atanasio Girardot, Medellín
Referee: Carlos Betancur

Junior won 3–1 on aggregate.

=== Top scorers ===
Rank	Player	Club	Goals
1	(Colombia) Andrey Estupiñán	Deportivo Pasto	13
1	(Colombia) Luis Muriel	Junior	13
3	(Colombia) Hugo Rodallega	Santa Fe	12
4	(Colombia) Jorge Rivaldo	Águilas Doradas	11
4	(Colombia) Alfredo Morelos	Atlético Nacional	11
6	(Colombia) Yeison Guzmán	América de Cali	10
6	(Colombia) Dayro Moreno	Once Caldas	10
8	(Colombia) Andrés Arroyo	Fortaleza	9
9	(Argentina) Rodrigo Contreras	Millonarios	8

Source: BeSoccer

=== Attendances ===
Liga DIMAYOR clubs ranked by average home league attendance during the first stage of the 2026 Apertura tournament:

Pos	Club	Total	Average
1	Millonarios	292,474	29,247
2	Atlético Nacional	224,015	24,891
3	Deportivo Cali	181,517	18,152
4	América de Cali	119,094	13,233
5	Santa Fe	118,262	13,140
6	Once Caldas	116,951	11,695
7	Deportivo Pasto	112,989	11,299
8	Independiente Medellín	108,436	10,844
9	Atlético Bucaramanga	97,128	10,792
10	Deportes Tolima	82,760	8,276
11	Junior	70,383	7,038
12	Cúcuta Deportivo	61,009	6,779
13	Alianza	35,463	3,940
14	Llaneros	34,000	3,778
15	Fortaleza	36,450	3,645
16	Internacional de Bogotá	32,061	3,562
17	Boyacá Chicó	26,350	3,294
18	Jaguares	29,480	3,276
19	Águilas Doradas	29,125	2,913
20	Deportivo Pereira	11,700	1,950

== Torneo Finalización ==
The Torneo Finalización, officially known as Liga BetPlay Dimayor 2026–II, is the 103rd first division football championship and the second and final tournament of the 2026 season. It began on 24 July and is scheduled to end on 22 December 2026. The champions will qualify for the 2027 Copa Libertadores group stage.

=== First stage ===
==== Standings ====
Pos	Team	Pld	W	D	L	GF	GA	GD	Pts	Qualification
1	Atlético Nacional	19	12	4	3	38	18	+20	40	Advance to the semi-finals
2	América de Cali	19	10	6	3	31	15	+16	36	Advance to the semi-finals
3	Deportivo Cali	19	9	8	2	28	12	+16	35	Advance to the semi-finals
4	Atlético Bucaramanga	19	9	8	2	31	17	+14	35	Advance to the semi-finals
5	Santa Fe	19	10	4	5	30	18	+12	34	Advance to the semi-finals
6	Independiente Medellín	19	10	2	7	29	25	+4	32	Advance to the semi-finals
7	Millonarios	19	7	9	3	27	16	+11	30	Advance to the semi-finals
8	Once Caldas	19	7	7	5	23	19	+4	28	Advance to the semi-finals
9	Deportes Tolima	19	7	6	6	25	23	+2	27	
10	Cúcuta Deportivo	19	8	3	8	21	26	−5	27	
11	Águilas Doradas	19	6	7	6	22	22	0	25	
12	Llaneros	19	7	3	9	21	24	−3	24	
13	Internacional de Bogotá	19	5	8	6	25	25	0	23	
14	Junior	19	5	7	7	26	27	−1	22	
15	Boyacá Chicó	19	5	5	9	15	29	−14	20	
16	Alianza	19	5	3	11	18	33	−15	18	
17	Deportivo Pereira	19	3	8	8	16	28	−12	17	
18	Deportivo Pasto	19	4	3	12	13	30	−17	15	
19	Jaguares	19	3	4	12	17	37	−20	13	
20	Fortaleza	19	1	9	9	17	29	−12	12	

Source: Dimayor, Soccerway
Rules for classification: 1) Points, 2) Goal difference, 3) Goals for, 4) Away goals for, 5) Goals against, 6) Away goals against, 7) Drawing of lots (or play-off matches, only if needed to decide eighth place).

==== Results ====
Home \ Away	AGU	ALI	AME	BUC	NAC	BOY	CUC	TOL	CAL	PAS	PER	FOR	DIM	IDB	JAG	JUN	LLA	MIL	ONC	SFE
Águilas Doradas	—	—	—	—	—	2–2	—	2–1	—	—	2–2	1–0	0–1	—	2–0	—	1–1	1–1	—	2–1
Alianza	2–2	—	—	2–3	1–5	—	—	1–2	—	—	0–0	1–1	—	1–0	—	1–0	1–2	—	—	1–4
América de Cali	1–0	3–0	—	—	1–0	7–0	3–1	—	0–0	0–1	—	2–1	1–2	—	—	4–2	—	—	—	—
Atlético Bucaramanga	1–1	—	1–1	—	1–1	—	1–1	—	—	2–1	—	1–0	2–2	2–0	—	3–1	1–1	—	—	—
Atlético Nacional	2–0	—	—	—	—	—	—	0–0	2–1	3–0	4–3	—	2–1	—	—	3–1	—	1–1	1–1	2–0
Boyacá Chicó	—	1–2	—	1–0	1–4	—	0–1	—	—	3–0	—	0–0	2–1	2–1	—	1–1	—	—	2–0	—
Cúcuta Deportivo	0–2	1–0	—	—	1–0	—	—	—	—	2–2	4–0	—	—	1–1	2–0	—	2–1	1–2	—	1–0
Deportes Tolima	—	—	1–1	0–0	—	0–0	2–1	—	—	0–1	—	—	2–3	2–1	—	2–1	—	2–1	—	—
Deportivo Cali	2–0	3–1	—	1–1	—	2–0	3–0	2–2	—	—	—	—	—	2–2	2–0	0–0	—	—	—	—
Deportivo Pasto	1–2	0–1	—	—	—	—	—	—	0–2	—	1–2	0–0	—	—	2–0	0–1	0–1	—	1–0	—
Deportivo Pereira	—	—	0–2	1–3	—	2–0	—	1–3	0–0	—	—	—	0–3	0–0	1–0	—	—	1–1	—	1–2
Fortaleza	—	—	—	—	1–2	—	2–0	2–2	1–1	—	0–0	—	0–3	—	—	1–4	—	1–1	1–2	—
Independiente Medellín	—	2–1	—	—	—	—	0–1	—	1–0	3–2	—	—	—	—	2–1	—	2–1	2–2	0–2	0–1
Internacional de Bogotá	2–2	—	3–0 (Note: Match awarded 3–0 to Internacional de Bogotá per ruling by the Court of Arbitration for Sport due to the improper registration of player Yhorman Hurtado by América de Cali. The match originally ended with América de Cali winning 0–2.)	—	2–3	—	—	—	—	1–1	—	2–1	3–1	—	1–0	—	3–2	—	1–1	0–2
Jaguares	—	1–2	2–2	0–4	0–3	1–0	—	3–2	—	—	—	2–2	—	—	—	—	1–0	—	1–1	—
Junior	1–0	—	—	—	—	—	2–0	—	—	—	1–1	—	2–0	2–2	3–3	—	—	0–1	1–1	1–1
Llaneros	—	—	1–2	—	2–0	0–0	—	1–2	0–3	—	1–0	3–1	—	—	—	3–2	—	0–2	—	1–0
Millonarios	—	2–0	0–0	0–1	—	3–0	—	—	1–1	2–0	—	—	—	0–0	4–1	—	—	—	1–1	—
Once Caldas	1–0	1–0	0–1	1–3	—	—	5–1	1–0	1–2	—	1–1	—	—	—	—	—	1–0	—	—	—
Santa Fe	—	—	0–0	2–1	—	2–0	—	1–0	0–1	5–0	—	2–2	—	—	2–1	—	—	3–2	2–2	—

Source: Dimayor, Soccerway
Legend: Blue = home team win; Yellow = draw; Red = away team win.

=== Semi-finals ===
The eight teams that advanced to the semi-finals were drawn into two groups of four teams, with the top two teams from the first stage being seeded in each group. The two group winners will advance to the finals.

==== Group A ====
Pos	Team	Pld	W	D	L	GF	GA	GD	Pts	Qualification	DIM	NAC	ONC	SFE
1	Independiente Medellín	1	1	0	0	1	0	+1	3	Advance to the Finals	—	a		1–0
2	Atlético Nacional	1	0	1	0	0	0	0	1 (Note: First stage position: Atlético Nacional 1st, Once Caldas 8th.)		a	—		
3	Once Caldas	1	0	1	0	0	0	0	1			0–0	—	
4	Santa Fe	1	0	0	1	0	1	−1	0					—

Updated to match(es) played on 21 November 2026. Source: Dimayor
Legend: Blue = home team win; Yellow = draw; Red = away team win.
Rules for classification: 1) Points, 2) First stage position (only applies for the seeded team, and only if it is involved in a tie for first place), 3) Goal difference, 4) Goals for, 5) Away goals for, 6) Away goals against, 7) First stage position.

==== Group B ====
Pos	Team	Pld	W	D	L	GF	GA	GD	Pts	Qualification	AME	BUC	CAL	MIL
1	América de Cali	1	0	1	0	2	2	0	1 (Note: América de Cali ahead of Atlético Bucaramanga, Deportivo Cali, and Millonarios for being the group's seeded team.)	Advance to the Finals	—		a	
2	Atlético Bucaramanga	1	0	1	0	2	2	0	1		2–2	—		
3	Deportivo Cali	1	0	1	0	0	0	0	1 (Note: First stage position: Deportivo Cali 3rd, Millonarios 7th.)		a		—	0–0
4	Millonarios	1	0	1	0	0	0	0	1					—

Updated to match(es) played on 20 November 2026. Source: Dimayor
Legend: Blue = home team win; Yellow = draw; Red = away team win.
Rules for classification: 1) Points, 2) First stage position (only applies for the seeded team, and only if it is involved in a tie for first place), 3) Goal difference, 4) Goals for, 5) Away goals for, 6) Away goals against, 7) First stage position.

=== Finals ===
December 2026
--:-- UTC−5

Group A winners	Group B winners

December 2026
--:-- UTC−5

Group B winners	Group A winners

1. ^{†} Order of legs to be determined, with the best-placed team in the Torneo Finalización's aggregate table hosting the second leg.

=== Top scorers ===
As of 21 November 2026

Rank	Player	Club	Goals
1	(Argentina) Luciano Pons	Atlético Bucaramanga	10
1	(Colombia) Yeison Guzmán	América de Cali	10
3	(Colombia) Emerson Batalla	Atlético Bucaramanga	8
4	(Argentina) Nahuel Bustos	Santa Fe	7
4	(Colombia) Andrés Sarmiento	Atlético Nacional	7
4	(Colombia) Dayro Moreno	Once Caldas	7
4	(Uruguay) Franco Fagúndez	Santa Fe	7
8	(Colombia) Edwin Cardona	Atlético Nacional	6
8	(Colombia) Andrés Rentería	Jaguares	6
8	(Venezuela) Eduard Bello	Deportivo Cali	6
8	(Colombia) Andrey Estupiñán	Millonarios	6
8	(Colombia) Jefry Zapata	Once Caldas	6

Source: BeSoccer

== Aggregate table ==
The results of all stages of the Apertura and Finalización tournaments are combined into a single table to determine qualification for international tournaments. The two best-placed teams in this table (excluding both tournament champions) at the end of the season will qualify for the Copa Libertadores second stage, with the next best three teams earning berths into the Copa Sudamericana first stage.

Pos	Team	Pld	W	D	L	GF	GA	GD	Pts	Qualification
1	Atlético Nacional (T)	45	30	6	9	87	39	+48	96	Qualification for Copa Libertadores second stage
2	América de Cali (X)	41	20	11	10	59	37	+22	71	Qualification for Copa Libertadores second stage
3	Santa Fe	43	18	15	10	65	43	+22	69	Qualification for Copa Sudamericana first stage
4	Junior (C, Q)	44	18	12	14	64	55	+9	66	Qualification for Copa Libertadores group stage
5	Deportes Tolima	42	17	13	12	56	44	+12	64	Qualification for Copa Sudamericana first stage
6	Deportivo Cali	39	16	15	8	48	28	+20	63	Qualification for Copa Sudamericana first stage
7	Once Caldas	41	15	18	8	56	44	+12	63	
8	Independiente Medellín	39	18	7	14	56	49	+7	61	
9	Atlético Bucaramanga	39	14	17	8	59	39	+20	59	
10	Millonarios	39	14	15	10	58	39	+19	57	
11	Águilas Doradas	38	13	12	13	42	47	−5	51	
12	Internacional de Bogotá	40	12	15	13	53	60	−7	51	
13	Deportivo Pasto	40	14	7	19	42	58	−16	49	
14	Llaneros	38	11	13	14	38	44	−6	46	
15	Cúcuta Deportivo	38	11	10	17	43	61	−18	43	
16	Boyacá Chicó	38	10	7	21	30	61	−31	37	
17	Alianza	38	8	11	19	31	60	−29	35	
18	Fortaleza	38	6	16	16	39	56	−17	34	
19	Jaguares	38	8	7	23	37	70	−33	31	
20	Deportivo Pereira	38	4	15	19	31	60	−29	27	

Updated to match(es) played on 21 November 2026. Source: Dimayor
Rules for classification: 1) Points, 2) Goal difference, 3) Goals for, 4) Away goals for, 5) Goals against, 6) Away goals against, 7) Drawing of lots.
(C) Champions; (Q) Qualified for the phase indicated; (T) Qualified, but not yet for the particular phase indicated; (X) Assured of Copa Sudamericana, but may still qualify for Copa Libertadores

== Relegation ==
A separate table was kept to determine the teams that were relegated to Torneo DIMAYOR for the next season. This table was elaborated from a sum of all first stage games played in the three most recent seasons (including the 2024–I, 2024–II, 2025–I, 2025–II, 2026–I, and 2026–II tournaments), with the points earned being averaged per match played. The bottom two teams of the relegation table at the end of the season were relegated to Torneo DIMAYOR.

Boyacá Chicó and Jaguares were relegated to the second-tier league after ending the season with the two lowest averages. The former was the first team to have their relegation confirmed, with three matches remaining following a 1–1 draw with Junior on 27 October 2026, while the latter were relegated with two rounds to go after a 1–0 victory for Cúcuta Deportivo against Santa Fe on 4 November 2026.

Pos	Team	2024 Pts	2025 Pts	2026 Pts	2026 GF	2026 GA	2026 GD	Total Pld	Total Pts	Avg.	Relegation
1	Atlético Nacional	56	72	80	73	33	+40	116	208	1.7931	
2	Deportes Tolima	72	74	58	52	40	+12	116	204	1.7586	
3	América de Cali	62	68	69	56	30	+26	116	199	1.7155	
4	Santa Fe	71	64	63	59	40	+19	116	198	1.7069	
5	Atlético Bucaramanga	66	66	58	57	37	+20	116	190	1.6379	
6	Junior	60	72	57	57	51	+6	116	189	1.6293	
7	Independiente Medellín	58	72	58	55	49	+6	116	188	1.6207	
8	Millonarios	66	64	56	58	39	+19	116	186	1.6034	
9	Once Caldas	60	60	61	54	41	+13	116	181	1.5603	
10	Deportivo Pasto	49	48	49	42	55	−13	116	146	1.2586	
11	Deportivo Cali	38	45	62	48	28	+20	116	145	1.2500	
12	Águilas Doradas	46	48	51	42	47	−5	116	145	1.2500	
13	Fortaleza	51	55	34	39	56	−17	116	140	1.2069	
14	Llaneros	—	45	46	38	44	−6	78	91	1.1667	
15	Deportivo Pereira	61	46	27	31	60	−29	116	134	1.1552	
16	Cúcuta Deportivo	—	—	43	43	61	−18	38	43	1.1316	
17	Internacional de Bogotá	55	24	51	51	51	0	116	130	1.1207	
18	Alianza	33	58	35	31	60	−29	116	126	1.0862	
19	Boyacá Chicó (R)	33	36	37	30	61	−31	116	106	0.9138	Relegation to Torneo DIMAYOR
20	Jaguares (R)	—	—	31	37	70	−33	38	31	0.8158	Relegation to Torneo DIMAYOR

Source: Dimayor
Rules for classification: 1) average, 2) 2026 points, 3) 2026 goal difference, 4) 2026 goals for, 5) 2026 away goals for, 6) 2026 goals against, 7) 2026 away goals against, 8) 2026 wins, 9) play-off match (only if needed to decide relegation).

== See also ==
- 2026 Torneo DIMAYOR
- 2026 Copa Colombia
