= Football in Colombia =

- Country: Colombia
- Governing body: Colombian Football Federation
- National team: Colombia
- First played: 1892

National competitions
- FIFA World Cup; Copa América

Club competitions
- Categoría Primera A Categoría Primera B Copa Colombia; Superliga Colombiana; Liga Femenina Profesional

International competitions
- FIFA Club World Cup; Copa Libertadores; Copa Sudamericana

Football is the most popular sport in Colombia. The sport is overseen by the Ministry of Sports and, as a private spectacle, is managed by the Colombian Football Federation (FCF), affiliated with CONMEBOL and FIFA. The FCF manages the DIMAYOR, which organises professional club championships, and the Colombian Amateur Football Division (Difútbol), which organises regional and amateur tournaments.

The Colombia national football team has participated in seven FIFA World Cups (1962, 1990, 1994, 1998, 2014, 2018 and 2026), with its best performance being a quarter-final appearance in 2014. The highest ranking it has ever achieved in the FIFA Men's World Rankings was third place in 2013.

== History ==
=== Early years ===
The introduction of football to Colombia is attributed to two early centres. In Bogotá, the sport was brought by American colonel Henry Rown Lemly, then director of the Escuela Militar (Military School), who established regulations based on English football rules; the first recorded match was played on 22 June 1892 between two teams of military cadets at the school's grounds. In Barranquilla, it is believed that English railway engineers from The Colombia Railways Company introduced the game around 1900, and the first match between the English and German colonies in the city is the first known game on the Caribbean coast.

Organised matches in Barranquilla grew rapidly from 1908. In 1917, the Comité de Fútbol was formed with a ground at the Parque Once de Noviembre. The success of football across the Caribbean coast led to the founding of the Liga del Atlántico in 1924, which gained affiliation with FIFA and CONMEBOL in 1936 as the Colombian representative body, eventually becoming the Colombian Football Federation.

The first clubs were formed in Barranquilla and Bogotá: Barranquilla FC, Polo Club, Escuela Militar, and Bartolinos. The 1918 Campeonato Nacional was the first tournament played between Colombian clubs. Deportivo Cali, founded on 23 November 1912, is the oldest club that remains as a professional team.

=== El Dorado ===
In 1948, a national professional league was created largely through the efforts of administrator Alfonso Senior Quevedo. Operating outside FIFA's jurisdiction due to a dispute over transfer regulations, the league recruited a number of world-class players, including Alfredo Di Stéfano, Adolfo Pedernera, Neil Franklin, and Charlie Mitten, earning the nickname "El Dorado". The period ended in 1954 after Colombia reached an agreement with FIFA through the Pacto de Lima, committing to return foreign players to their clubs of origin.

=== Colombian football schism ===
The 1960s saw a deep institutional conflict between the Asociación Colombiana de Fútbol (Adefútbol) and Dimayor over control of the game. In 1964, a group of professional clubs and regional leagues met in Villa del Rosario to form a rival body, Fedebol, with Alfonso Senior Quevedo as president. FIFA intervened and, at its 1966 Congress in London, recognised Fedebol as a provisional committee. In 1971 the current Colombian Football Federation (Colfútbol) was formally constituted and recognised as the country's sole governing body.

=== First World Cup ===
Colombia's first qualification for a FIFA World Cup came in 1961, after a play-off win over Peru. At the 1962 finals in Chile, the national team opened with a 2–1 defeat to Uruguay, but on 3 June in Arica produced one of the competition's most memorable matches: a 4–4 draw against the Soviet Union, during which Marcos Coll scored a Olympic goal, the only such goal in World Cup history. Colombia's campaign ended with a 5–0 defeat to Yugoslavia.

=== Olympic football and Copa América ===
Colombia made its first appearance at the Olympic football tournament in 1968, and went on to qualify again for Munich 1972 and Moscow 1980. In 1975, the national team reached the final of the 1975 Copa América, losing narrowly to Peru in a deciding match in Caracas to finish as runners-up, the country's best Copa América result until 2001.

=== The 1990s generation ===
Under coach Francisco Maturana, Colombia qualified for the 1990 World Cup in Italy, reaching the round of 16 for the first time. Their campaign included a celebrated 1–1 draw against West Germany, sealed by a last-minute goal from Freddy Rincón. They were eliminated 2–1 by Cameroon in extra time

During qualification for the 1994 FIFA World Cup, Colombia produced some outstanding results, most notably a 5–0 away win over Argentina in September 1993. However, the team was eliminated in the first round after Andrés Escobar scored an own goal against the United States; Escobar was murdered shortly after his return home. Colombia came third at the 1993 Copa América and third again at the 1995 Copa América. They returned to the 1998 World Cup but were once more eliminated in the group stage.

=== 21st century ===
Colombia hosted and won the 2001 Copa América, defeating Mexico 1–0 in the final in Bogotá under coach Francisco Maturana, to date the country's only Copa América title. As Copa América champions, Colombia participated in the 2003 FIFA Confederations Cup, finishing fourth after a third-place play-off defeat to Turkey.

After missing the 2002, 2006, and 2010 World Cups, Colombia returned to the 2014 tournament in Brazil. Under coach José Pékerman and led by Radamel Falcao García and James Rodríguez, the team reached the quarter-finals before a narrow 2–1 defeat to hosts Brazil. Rodríguez won the Golden Boot with six goals; his strike against Uruguay in the round of 16 won the 2014 FIFA Puskás Award.

Colombia qualified for and participated in the 2018 World Cup, advancing from their group before losing to England in the round of 16 on penalties after a 1–1 draw. They did not qualify for 2022, but secured their place in the 2026 tournament, their seventh World Cup appearance. Colombia topped their group unbeaten and defeated Ghana in the round of 32, before being eliminated by Switzerland on penalties (4–3) in the round of 16 following a scoreless draw after extra time.

== Copa América ==
Colombia did not enter the Copa América until the 1945 tournament, finishing fifth out of seven teams. After their runners-up finish in 1975, they have been regular contenders. Colombia hosted the 2001 Copa América and registered their only victory in the competition, defeating Mexico 1–0 in the final. In recent editions, notable results include fourth place at Peru 2004 and third place at the 2016 Copa América Centenario held in the United States.

== Women's football ==
The Colombia women's national team has participated in three FIFA Women's World Cups: 2011, 2015, and 2023, achieving their best performance at the Australia and New Zealand 2023 edition by reaching the quarter-finals. The team has been Copa América runners-up on four occasions (2010, 2014, 2022 and 2025) and won the gold medal at the 2019 Pan American Games in Lima.

At youth level, the under-17 women's team has been the most successful of any Colombian national side at a FIFA tournament, reaching the final of the 2022 FIFA U-17 Women's World Cup in India, the first Colombian national team of any category to reach a FIFA world championship final, before losing to Spain. At under-20 level, Colombia has twice reached the final of the South American Women's U-20 Football Championship (2010 and 2022) and participated in the 2010 FIFA U-20 Women's World Cup and 2022 editions of the under-20 World Cup.

== Youth football ==
The men's under-20 team has been the most successful of the Colombian youth sides, winning the South American Youth Football Championship three times (1987, 2005 and 2013), and finishing third at the FIFA World Youth Championship in both 2003 and 2025.

The men's under-17 team has won the South American Under-17 Football Championship twice (1993 and 2026) and reached fourth place at the FIFA U-17 World Cup in both 2003 and 2009.

== League system ==
The Colombian professional league structure comprises three divisions:

- Categoría Primera A: the top flight, founded in 1948 (won by Santa Fe in its inaugural edition). Twenty clubs compete annually. Atlético Nacional is the most decorated club in Primera A history with 18 titles.
- Categoría Primera B: the second division, created in 1991, with 16 clubs currently participating. Two clubs are promoted directly each season.
- Categoría Primera C: an amateur third division organised by Difútbol, reactivated in 2021 without a promotion pathway to the second division.

In 1968, the top flight adopted the pattern common in South America of splitting into two separate competitions per season, the Apertura (January to June) and the Finalización (July to December).

The Copa Colombia has been played annually since 2008 (after a 19-year hiatus) and is open to both Primera A and Primera B clubs. The Superliga Colombiana pits the Apertura and Finalización champions of the previous year against each other. Atlético Nacional is the most successful club in both competitions.

In 2017, the Colombian Women's Football League was founded as the first professional women's league in the country, with Santa Fe as its inaugural champion.

== Club football ==
=== Copa Libertadores ===
Two Colombian clubs have won the Copa Libertadores: Atlético Nacional in 1989 and 2016, and Once Caldas in 2004. América de Cali reached three consecutive finals without winning (1985, 1986, 1987), and Deportivo Cali lost the 1978 final to Boca Juniors. In 2016, Atlético Nacional became the first Colombian club to participate in the FIFA Club World Cup, finishing third.

=== Copa Sudamericana ===
Santa Fe became the first Colombian winners of the Copa Sudamericana in 2015. Junior de Barranquilla was runner-up in 2018.

=== Women's club football ===
Atlético Huila won the 2018 Copa Libertadores Femenina, becoming the first Colombian women's club champion at continental level. Other clubs to have reached Copa Libertadores Femenina finals include Santa Fe (2021, 2024) and América de Cali (2020).

=== Rivalries ===
The principal national derbies include:

- Superclásico: Atlético Nacional vs Millonarios
- Clásico Popular: Atlético Nacional vs América de Cali
- Clásico bogotano: Millonarios vs Independiente Santa Fe
- Clásico paisa: Atlético Nacional vs Independiente Medellín
- Clásico vallecaucano: América de Cali vs Deportivo Cali

== Football in Colombian culture ==
Prior to the 1980s, the Colombia national football team had a limited following, partly due to underinvestment by the FCF, broader social instability including La Violencia, and irregular participation in international tournaments. Despite qualifying for the 1962 FIFA World Cup, Colombian football remained underrated internationally.

From the mid-1980s onwards, there was an emergence of a new generation of internationally recognized players, René Higuita, Carlos Valderrama, Faustino Asprilla, Andrés Escobar and Arnoldo Iguarán, and the national team became a symbol of national identity. Since then, football has been a powerful force for national unity, with Colombia's performances in the 1990 and 2014 World Cups in particular generating widespread celebration across the country.

== Colombian football stadiums ==
Stadiums with a capacity of 40,000 or higher:

#	Stadium	City	Inaugurated	Capacity	Tenants
1	Metropolitano Roberto Meléndez	Barranquilla	1986	46,692	Junior
2	Estadio Deportivo Cali	Palmira	2010	44,000	Deportivo Cali
3	Estadio General Santander	Cúcuta	1948	42,901	Cúcuta Deportivo
4	Estadio Atanasio Girardot	Medellín	1953	40,943	Atlético Nacional; Independiente Medellín

== See also ==
- Colombia national football team
- Colombia women's national football team
- Colombian Football Federation
- Categoría Primera A
- Categoría Primera B
- Copa Colombia
- Superliga Colombiana
