= Sebastián Botero =

American-born Colombian footballer (born 1986)

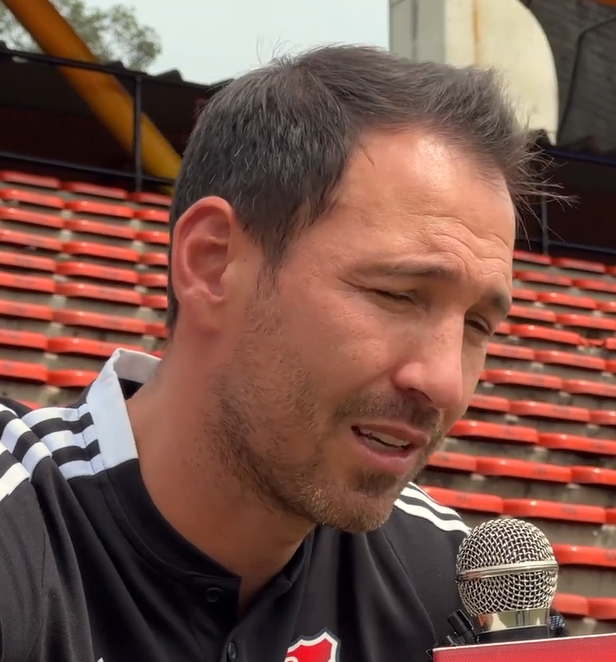
- Botero in 2022

Personal information
- Full name: Juan Sebastián Botero
- Date of birth: July 4, 1986 (age 40)
- Place of birth: Ames, Iowa, United States
- Height: 1.83 m (6 ft 0 in)
- Position: Midfielder

Team information
- Current team: Bogotá (head coach)

Youth career
- 1999–2003: Independiente Medellín

Senior career*
| Years | Team | Apps | (Gls) |
| 2003–2007 | Independiente Medellín | 46 | (?) |
| 2007 | FC Dallas | 0 | (0) |
| 2008–2009 | Atlético Huila | | |
| 2009 | Once Caldas | | |
| 2009 | Independiente Medellín | | |
| 2012 | Cúcuta Deportivo | | |
| 2013 | Deportivo Rionegro | | |
| 2013 | Atlético Huila | 8 | (0) |

International career^{‡}
| 2003 | Colombia U-17 | | |

Managerial career
- 2014–2020: Independiente Medellín (youth)
- 2020–2022: Fortaleza C.E.I.F. (youth)
- 2022–2026: Independiente Medellín (youth)
- 2023: Independiente Medellín (caretaker)
- 2026: Independiente Medellín (caretaker)
- 2026–: Bogotá
- * Club domestic league appearances and goals as of August 23, 2007 ‡ National team caps and goals as of August 23, 2007

Juan Sebastián Botero (born July 4, 1986) is an American-born Colombian soccer manager and former midfielder. His parents moved from Colombia to the United States before he was born. He is the current head coach of Colombian club Bogotá.

== Football career ==
Botero and his family moved back to Colombia when he was one year old, and he joined the Independiente Medellín youth system at age 13. He made his professional first team debut for Medellín at age 17, on August 3, 2003, versus Atlético Huila. In his four years with the club, he went on to make 46 first team appearances, playing his final game in June 2007 against Cúcuta Deportivo.

In 2003, Botero played for the Colombia national under-17 football team in the South American U-17 Championship held in Bolivia, scoring a goal against Paraguay while also playing against Argentina, Brazil, Bolivia, and Uruguay. This Colombian team was managed by coach Eduardo Lara.

Botero was on the development roster with FC Dallas during 2007, but was waived at the end of the year. He was later picked up to play for Atlético Huila to perform in the Copa Mustang in Colombia, and played for Once Caldas during the second half of 2009. Then, in 2012 he was hired by Cúcuta Deportivo.

== Retirement and managerial career ==
In 2013 and after playing for Deportivo Rionegro and Atlético Huila again, Botero decided to retire from his activity as a professional soccer player in Colombia. From that moment on, he dedicated himself to coaching minor soccer divisions in the South American country, including the youth teams of Independiente Medellín and Fortaleza C.E.I.F. Likewise, in later years, he began to give sports conferences, narrating and teaching about the soccer sports career, starting in minor divisions, until reaching the professional soccer environment.

On May 9, 2023, he was appointed as caretaker coach of Independiente Medellín, being at the role until the end of the 2023 Apertura tournament, when he returned to his previous role as head coach of Independiente Medellín's under-20 squad, with which he won the domestic youth championship in 2025.

On April 21, 2026, he was recalled as caretaker coach of Independiente Medellín's first team, replacing Alejandro Restrepo. He left Independiente Medellín on June 4, 2026, after being appointed as head coach of Categoría Primera B club Bogotá.

== Clubs ==
Most of his sports career was developed in Colombia, a country where he continued to live after retiring as a professional player.

| Club | Country | Year |
|---|---|---|
| Independiente Medellín | Colombia | 2004–2007 |
| FC Dallas | United States | 2007 |
| Atlético Huila | Colombia | 2008–2009 |
| Once Caldas | Colombia | 2009 |
| Cúcuta Deportivo | Colombia | 2012 |
| Deportivo Rionegro | Colombia | 2013 |
| Atlético Huila | Colombia | 2013 |
