= Sebastián Oliveros =

Colombian football manager (born 1987)

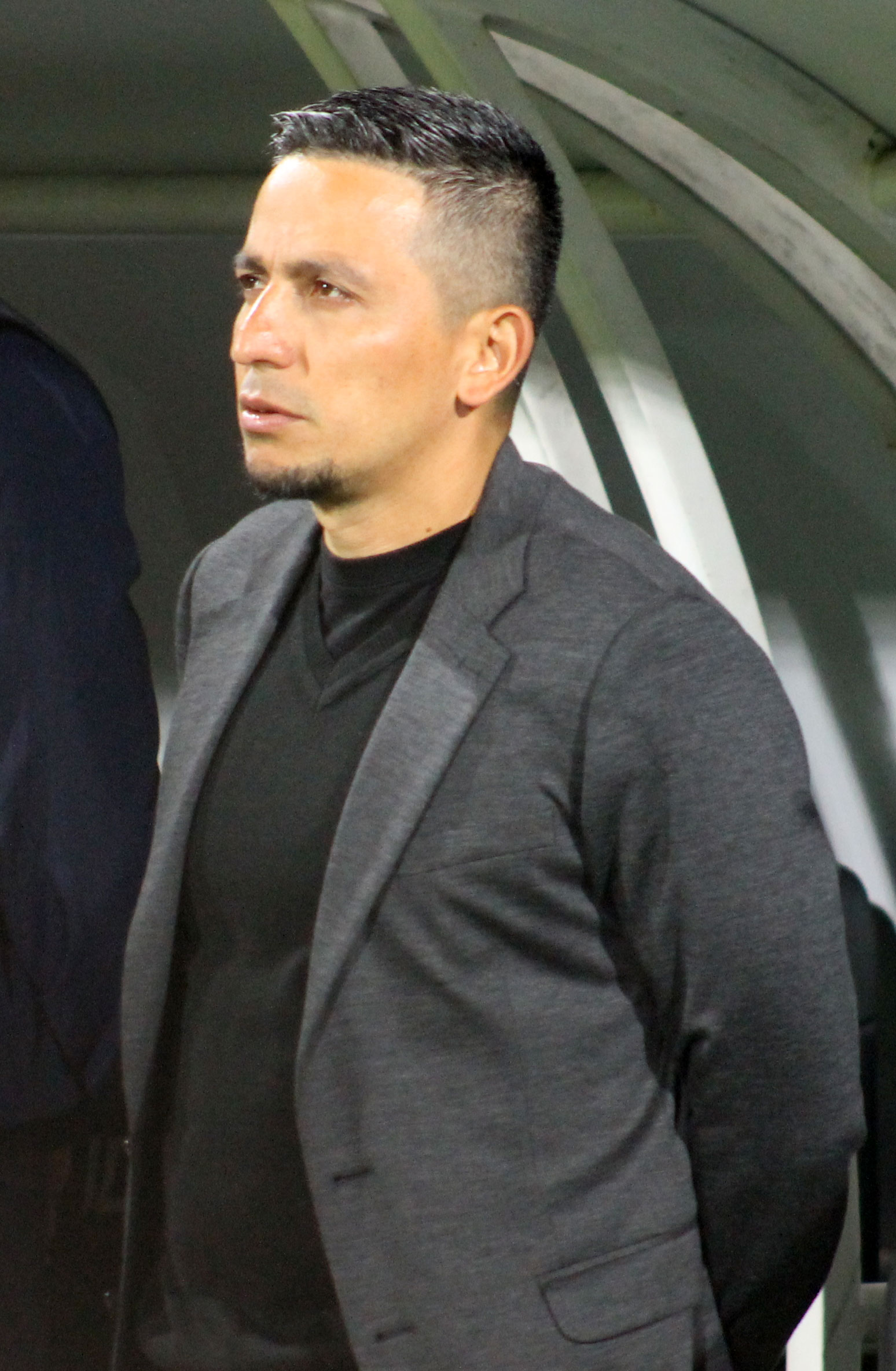
- Oliveros in 2025

Personal information
- Full name: Sebastián Oliveros Gabriel
- Date of birth: 24 November 1987 (age 38)
- Place of birth: Bogotá, Colombia

Managerial career
- Years: Team
- 2008–2010: Atlético Bogotá U17
- 2011: Fortaleza U13
- 2011–2015: La Masía (youth)
- 2015–2022: Fortaleza CEIF (assistant)
- 2018–2020: Fortaleza CEIF U17
- 2023–2026: Fortaleza CEIF
- 2026: Deportes Tolima

Sebastián Oliveros Gabriel (born 24 November 1987) is a Colombian football manager.

== Career ==
Born in Bogotá, Oliveros began his career with the under-17 team of CD Atlético Bogotá FC in 2008, aged just 18. After being one of the founding members of CD La Masía, he joined Fortaleza CEIF in 2015, as an assistant manager of the main squad.

Between 2017 and 2020, Oliveros also worked with the under-17 squad of Fortaleza while still being an assistant. On 23 November 2022, he was appointed manager of the first team in the Categoría Primera B, after Nelson Flórez left for Barranquilla.

Oliveros led Fortaleza to the 2023 Torneo II title, assuring their promotion to the Categoría Primera A. After nearly four years at the helm of Fortaleza, he left the club on 30 June 2026 upon being appointed as manager of Deportes Tolima, but he was dismissed from the latter the following 28 September.
