= Fortaleza F.C. =

Colombian football club

Fortaleza
- Full name: Fortaleza Fútbol Club
- Nicknames: Forta; Rey del Twitter (King of Twitter); Los Amix (The Friends)
- Founded: 15 November 2010; 15 years ago
- Ground: Metropolitano de Techo
- Capacity: 10,000
- President: Francisco Serrano
- Head coach: Diego Arias
- League: Categoría Primera A
- 2025: Primera A, 11th of 20
- Website: www.fortalezaceif.co
Home colours	Away colours	Third colours

Fortaleza Fútbol Club is a professional Colombian football team based in Bogotá, currently playing in the Categoría Primera A, the top tier of Colombian football. The team has been promoted to the Categoría Primera A thrice, in 2013, 2015 and 2023. From 2018 to 2020, they played their home games at the Estadio Municipal de Cota, moving afterwards to the Estadio Metropolitano de Techo in Bogotá.

== History ==
The club was founded on 15 November 2010 as Fortaleza F.C., based in the municipality of Soacha. The club joined the Categoría Primera B after buying the licence of the recently dissolved club Atlético Juventud.

In the 2013 Primera B season, the team was champion of the Finalización tournament, allowing them play the finals against Uniautónoma. The team lost the title, losing the home match with a 0–2 score, and drawing 1–1 in the away match. However, the team was promoted to the Primera A after winning against Cúcuta Deportivo in the Promotion/relegation playoff with a 2–1 global score.

Fortaleza was relegated after its first year in the Primera A. The club ranked 16th in the Apertura tournament and 13th in the Finalización tournament, being the worst team in the Relegation table.

In 2015, the club was renamed Fortaleza C.E.I.F. after merging with the amateur football club C.E.I.F. (Centro de Entrenamiento Integrado para el Fútbol), founded in 2008. That season, the club was promoted after reaching the finals, however they lost the title against Atlético Bucaramanga with a 0–2 aggregate score. Fortaleza's second spell in the top flight also lasted one season, sealing their relegation back to Primera B with three matches to go after losing to Patriotas on 22 October 2016.

After two seasons of mid-table performances, Fortaleza found themselves contending for promotion in the 2019 Primera B season, in which they made it to the Torneo II semi-finals but were knocked out at that stage by the eventual runners-up Boyacá Chicó, and were a serious contender in the final tournament of the 2021 season. They advanced to the semi-finals after placing fourth in the first stage, and were leading their group with 10 points prior to the final matchday. Fortaleza needed to hold on to the top spot in order to achieve promotion, which they would manage by avoiding defeat against Bogotá, while at the same time Llaneros and Unión Magdalena were playing their match in Villavicencio, with the latter side having a chance at promotion if they won and Fortaleza lost their match. Despite losing their match to Bogotá, Fortaleza were promoting to Primera A since Llaneros were winning their game, however, two goals scored by Unión Magdalena in stoppage time ended Fortaleza's promotion chances and triggered a match-fixing inquiry. Although Fortaleza officially requested to get the match played in Villavicencio annulled and Unión Magdalena's promotion reversed, the inquiry failed to find any irregularity.

Fortaleza returned to Primera A at the end of the 2023 Primera B season, sealing promotion after defeating Cúcuta Deportivo in the Torneo II finals and securing the top spot in the season's aggregate table. They eventually ended as season runners-up after losing the grand final to Patriotas.

Fortaleza managed to avoid immediate relegation back to Primera B in its third spell in the top tier, placing 13th in the relegation table of the 2024 Primera A. On 22 January 2025, the club presented Colombian singer Carlos Vives and former cyclist Rigoberto Urán as its new shareholders, and in the 2025 Finalización tournament it managed to advance to the final stages of the league for the first time ever. On 25 November 2025, Fortaleza announced the exit of Carlos Barato, founder of the club CEIF and former Fortaleza CEIF chairman. As part of the agreement reached with Barato for his departure, the club ended its partnership with CEIF and reverted to its previous name Fortaleza Fútbol Club effective from 1 January 2026.

== Honours ==
=== Domestic ===
- Categoría Primera B
  - Runners-up (3): 2013, 2015, 2023

== Current squad ==
As of 24 September 2026

Note: Flags indicate national team as defined under FIFA eligibility rules; some limited exceptions apply. Players may hold more than one non-FIFA nationality.

No.	Pos.	Nation	Player
1	GK	ARG	Williams Barlasina
2	DF	COL	Andrés Copete
3	DF	COL	David Ramírez (on loan from Santa Fe)
4	DF	COL	Edwin Cabezas
5	DF	COL	Jeferson Medina
6	MF	COL	Yesid Díaz
7	FW	COL	Ítalo Montaño
8	MF	COL	Sebastián Navarro
9	FW	COL	Juan Sebastián Herrera
10	MF	COL	Jhon Velásquez
11	FW	COL	Andy Batioja (on loan from Atlético Nacional)
12	GK	COL	Cristian Santander
13	MF	COL	Brandon Mejía
14	MF	COL	Leonardo Pico (captain)
15	DF	COL	Santiago Cuero
16	DF	COL	Joan Cajares

No.	Pos.	Nation	Player
17	MF	COL	Kevin Balanta
18	DF	COL	Harold Balanta
19	FW	ARG	Franco Pulicastro
20	FW	COL	Jhonier Blanco
22	GK	COL	Michael Barragán
23	DF	COL	Juan Castillo
24	FW	COL	Jhonier Salas
25	MF	COL	Juan David García
26	FW	COL	Richardson Rivas
27	FW	COL	Julio Sinisterra
28	MF	COL	Santiago Vivas
29	FW	MEX	Teun Wilke (on loan from Guadalajara)
30	MF	COL	Jhon Solís
32	MF	ARG	Mariano Vázquez
—	DF	COL	Jonathan Marulanda
—	MF	COL	Jerónimo Barrera

=== Out on loan ===
Note: Flags indicate national team as defined under FIFA eligibility rules; some limited exceptions apply. Players may hold more than one non-FIFA nationality.

No.	Pos.	Nation	Player
—	MF	COL	Andrés Arroyo (at Pachuca)
—	MF	COL	Sebastian Ramírez (at Vancouver Whitecaps)

No.	Pos.	Nation	Player
—	FW	COL	Jader Martínez (at Tigres)

== Managers ==
- (Colombia) Jaime Manjarrés (2011–2012)
- (Colombia) Roberto Vidales (2012–2013)
- (Colombia) Hernán Pacheco (2013–2014)
- (Colombia) Alexis García (2014)
- (Colombia) Nilton Bernal (2015–2016)
- (Colombia) Freddy Amazo (2016)
- (Colombia) Carlos Barato (2016–2017)
- (Colombia) Carlos Mora (2017)
- (Colombia) David Barato (2018–2019)
- (Argentina) Pablo Garabello (2020)
- (Colombia) Nelson Flórez (2021–2023)
- (Colombia) Sebastián Oliveros (2023–2026)
- (Colombia) Diego Arias (2026–)

Source: Worldfootball.net

== See also ==
- Atlético Juventud Soacha
