= El Clásico Paisa =

Football rivalry in Colombia

- Location: Medellín, Colombia
- Teams: Atlético Nacional; Independiente Medellín
- First meeting: Atlético Municipal 0–3 Medellín; Campeonato Profesional (12 September 1948)
- Latest meeting: Atl. Nacional 2–1 Medellín; 2026 Finalización (25 October 2026)
- Next meeting: Atl. Nacional vs. Medellín; 2026 Finalización (25 November 2026)
- Stadiums: Estadio Atanasio Girardot

Statistics
- Total meetings: 347 matches
- Most wins: Atlético Nacional (139)
- Top scorer: Víctor Aristizábal (19)
- All-time series: Atl. Nacional: 139; Drawn: 110; Medellín: 98
- Largest victory: Atl. Nacional 7–2 Medellín (4 July 1959); Atl. Nacional 6–0 Medellín (4 November 1976); Atl. Nacional 0–5 Medellín (3 December 2023); Medellín 5–1 Atl. Nacional (28 April 1979) (27 June 2011)

El Clásico Paisa is the name for the rivalry between Colombian football teams Atlético Nacional and Independiente Medellín, both based in Medellín. They share Estadio Atanasio Girardot, with a capacity of over 40,000. The two teams are among the most successful teams in Categoría Primera A, with Atlético Nacional the most successful in Colombia in terms of total trophies won, compared to Independiente Medellín, who instead are characterized by their loyal fanbase and their involvement in numerous league finals since the turn of the 21st century.

The match started to gain more importance in the early 2000s, when Independiente Medellín ended their 40+ year title drought with their title in the 2002 Finalización tournament, and with El Poderoso defeating Nacional in the 2004 Apertura finals. It is considered to be one of the most important derbies in Colombia.

The rivalry is mainly dominated by Atlético Nacional, who has won 139 matches, while Independiente Medellín has won 98. The top goalscorer of the derby is Víctor Aristizábal, who scored 19 goals for Atlético Nacional.

== History ==
The first time the two clubs met was during the 1948 Campeonato Profesional on 12 September 1948, a 3–0 victory by Independiente Medellín.

In the first nine editions, Atlético Nacional (called Atlético Municipal during that time) could not beat Independiente Medellín, and it was not until 1954 that Nacional got their first win in the derby, winning 1–0. On 4 July 1959, Nacional defeated Medellín 7–2, the most goals they have scored on Medellín in a single match. In 1976 Nacional beat Medellín 6–0, the largest margin of victory in the rivalry. In 1994, Nacional claimed their sixth league title by defeating their crosstown rivals 1–0 on the final round of the final quadrangular with a late goal by Juan Pablo Ángel. Five years later, a similar situation happened again; Nacional beat Medellín 1–0 in the Torneo Finalización finals with a late goal and qualified for the season's grand final where they defeated América de Cali. However, Medellín got their revenge by winning four derbies from 2000 to 2001, including a 4–0 victory on 18 February 2001.

In 2004, Medellín and Nacional qualified for the Torneo Apertura finals by winning their respective semi-final groups. In the first leg, Medellín won 2–1 with goals from Rafael Castillo and Jorge Serna. The second leg, played on 27 June 2004, ended in a 0–0 draw, thus giving the red-clad club its third title and second in three years. Starting from that day, the next seven derbies were won by Nacional, including a 4–0 victory on 19 March 2005. It took Medellín 30 months after winning the 2004 title for them to beat Nacional again, breaking that streak with a 1–0 win on 4 November 2006.

On 5 August 2009, Medellín beat Nacional 2–0 at that year's Copa Colombia. Medellín went on an unbeaten run in the next six matches, until Nacional defeated them 1–0 on 12 September 2010 in the Torneo Finalización.

On 27 June 2011, exactly seven years after the 2004 Apertura final, Medellín thrashed Nacional 5–1 in a match valid for the 2011 Copa Colombia.

In the 2015 Torneo Finalización, the two sides faced each other in one of the tournament's double-legged semi-finals. The first leg played on 10 December, was won by Medellín 1–0. In the second leg Nacional bounced back from this adverse score, winning 2–0 and qualifying to the finals, which they later won to claim their 15th title.

On 3 December 2023, Medellín beat Nacional 5–0, with Nacional being the home team. The match was played at the Estadio Polideportivo Sur in Envigado due to a Karol G concert at Estadio Atanasio Girardot, and this score became Medellín's greatest margin of victory over Nacional. The match had to be ended early due to protests of Nacional fans who were causing disturbances.

== Statistics ==
=== Head-to-head ===
As of 25 October 2026

Competition	Matches	Wins Atlético Nacional	Draws	Wins Independiente Medellín	Goals Atlético Nacional	Goals Independiente Medellín
Categoría Primera A	327	131	106	90	446	376
Copa Colombia	20	8	4	8	29	28
Total matches	347	139	110	98	475	404

=== Official matches by first division ===
N°	Local Team	Result	Visiting Team	Date	Phase
1	Atlético Municipal	0 – 3	Independiente Medellín	September 12, 1948	Round-robin 1948
2	Independiente Medellín	2 – 1	Atlético Municipal	November 21, 1948	Round-robin 1948
3	Independiente Medellín	0 – 0	Atlético Municipal	July 3, 1949	Round-robin 1949
4	Atlético Municipal	2 – 4	Independiente Medellín	October 9, 1949	Round-robin 1949
5	Atlético Municipal	1 – 2	Independiente Medellín	April 2, 1950	Round-robin 1950
6	Independiente Medellín	0 – 1	Atlético Nacional	July 23, 1950	Round-robin 1950
7	Atlético Nacional	2 – 2	Independiente Medellín	June 17, 1951	Round-robin 1951
8	Independiente Medellín	3 – 1	Atlético Nacional	October 28, 1951	Round-robin 1951
9	Independiente Medellín	2 – 2	Atlético Nacional	19860	Round-robin 1954
10	Atlético Nacional	1 – 0	Independiente Medellín	September 26, 1954	Round-robin 1954
11	Atlético Nacional	1 – 2	Independiente Medellín	June 19, 1955	Round-robin 1955
12	Independiente Medellín	2 – 1	Atlético Nacional	September 4, 1955	Round-robin 1955
13	Atlético Nacional	1 – 0	Independiente Medellín	November 6, 1955	Round-robin 1955
14	Atlético Nacional	2 – 2	Independiente Medellín	June 3, 1956	Round-robin 1956
15	Independiente Medellín	4 – 2	Atlético Nacional	September 16, 1956	Round-robin 1956
16	Atlético Nacional	0 – 2	Independiente Medellín	20945	Round-robin 1957
17	Independiente Medellín	1 – 2	Atlético Nacional	August 11, 1957	Round-robin 1957
18	Independiente Medellín	2 – 1	Atlético Nacional	October 13, 1957	Zonal Hexagonal 1957
19	Atlético Nacional	1 – 1	Independiente Medellín	November 10, 1957	Zonal Hexagonal 1957
20	Independiente Medellín	2 – 3	Atlético Nacional	April 26, 1959	Round-robin 1959
21	Atlético Nacional	7 – 2	Independiente Medellín	July 4, 1959	Round-robin 1959
22	Independiente Medellín	3 – 0	Atlético Nacional	September 20, 1959	Round-robin 1959
23	Atlético Nacional	0 – 3	Independiente Medellín	November 29, 1959	Round-robin 1959
24	Atlético Nacional	0 – 3	Independiente Medellín	22051	Round-robin 1960
25	Independiente Medellín	0 – 1	Atlético Nacional	July 17, 1960	Round-robin 1960
26	Atlético Nacional	0 – 2	Independiente Medellín	September 25, 1960	Round-robin 1960
27	Independiente Medellín	1 – 2	Atlético Nacional	December 4, 1960	Round-robin 1960
28	Independiente Medellín	1 – 1	Atlético Nacional	22422	Round-robin 1961
29	Atlético Nacional	0 – 3	Independiente Medellín	July 20, 1961	Round-robin 1961
30	Independiente Medellín	3 – 0	Atlético Nacional	October 1, 1961	Round-robin 1961
31	Atlético Nacional	5 – 2	Independiente Medellín	December 10, 1961	Round-robin 1961
32	Atlético Nacional	3 – 1	Independiente Medellín	March 11, 1962	Round-robin 1962
33	Independiente Medellín	3 – 2	Atlético Nacional	June 3, 1962	Round-robin 1962
34	Atlético Nacional	0 – 0	Independiente Medellín	August 19, 1962	Round-robin 1962
35	Independiente Medellín	3 – 1	Atlético Nacional	November 4, 1962	Round-robin 1962
36	Independiente Medellín	3 – 0	Atlético Nacional	August 15, 1963	Round-robin 1963
37	Atlético Nacional	1 – 1	Independiente Medellín	June 2, 1963	Round-robin 1963
38	Independiente Medellín	1 – 0	Atlético Nacional	August 15, 1963	Round-robin 1963
39	Atlético Nacional	3 – 2	Independiente Medellín	November 10, 1963	Round-robin 1963
40	Independiente Medellín	3 – 1	Atlético Nacional	23504	Round-robin 1964
41	Atlético Nacional	2 – 0	Independiente Medellín	July 19, 1964	Round-robin 1964
42	Independiente Medellín	2 – 0	Atlético Nacional	October 11, 1964	Round-robin 1964
43	Atlético Nacional	2 – 0	Independiente Medellín	December 23, 1964	Round-robin 1964
44	Independiente Medellín	1 – 1	Atlético Nacional	March 14, 1965	Round-robin 1965
45	Atlético Nacional	1 – 1	Independiente Medellín	23892	Round-robin 1965
46	Independiente Medellín	1 – 2	Atlético Nacional	August 22, 1965	Round-robin 1965
47	Atlético Nacional	1 – 4	Independiente Medellín	November 14, 1965	Round-robin 1965
48	Atlético Nacional	1 – 3	Independiente Medellín	April 24, 1966	Round-robin 1966
49	Independiente Medellín	1 – 2	Atlético Nacional	July 10, 1966	Round-robin 1966
50	Atlético Nacional	0 – 2	Independiente Medellín	October 2, 1966	Round-robin 1966
51	Independiente Medellín	3 – 1	Atlético Nacional	December 11, 1966	Round-robin 1966
52	Atlético Nacional	3 – 2	Independiente Medellín	April 30, 1967	Round-robin 1967
53	Independiente Medellín	1 – 2	Atlético Nacional	July 2, 1967	Round-robin 1967
54	Atlético Nacional	2 – 3	Independiente Medellín	September 24, 1967	Round-robin 1967
55	Independiente Medellín	1 – 1	Atlético Nacional	December 10, 1967	Round-robin 1967
56	Independiente Medellín	1 – 0	Atlético Nacional	April 7, 1968	Apertura Tournament 1968
57	Atlético Nacional	0 – 0	Independiente Medellín	June 16, 1968	Apertura Tournament 1968
58	Independiente Medellín	0 – 1	Atlético Nacional	August 4, 1968	Finalización Tournament 1968
59	Atlético Nacional	1 – 2	Independiente Medellín	October 20, 1968	Finalización Tournament 1968
60	Independiente Medellín	1 – 0	Atlético Nacional	March 2, 1969	Apertura Tournament 1969
61	Atlético Nacional	3 – 0	Independiente Medellín	25338	Apertura Tournament 1969
62	Independiente Medellín	1 – 0	Atlético Nacional	April 18, 1969	Finalización Tournament 1969
63	Atlético Nacional	3 – 1	Independiente Medellín	September 28, 1969	Finalización Tournament 1969
64	Independiente Medellín	4 – 0	Atlético Nacional	April 18, 1970	Apertura Tournament 1970
65	Atlético Nacional	1 – 2	Independiente Medellín	25691	Apertura Tournament 1970
66	Independiente Medellín	1 – 0	Atlético Nacional	September 13, 1970	Finalización Tournament 1970
67	Atlético Nacional	1 – 1	Independiente Medellín	November 29, 1970	Finalización Tournament 1970
68	Independiente Medellín	0 – 0	Atlético Nacional	April 9, 1972	Apertura Tournament 1972
69	Atlético Nacional	0 – 1	Independiente Medellín	June 29, 1972	Apertura Tournament 1972
70	Atlético Nacional	2 – 1	Independiente Medellín	September 17, 1972	Finalización Tournament 1972
71	Independiente Medellín	0 – 0	Atlético Nacional	December 3, 1972	Finalización Tournament 1972
72	Independiente Medellín	2 – 2	Atlético Nacional	April 5, 1973	Apertura Tournament 1973
73	Atlético Nacional	1 – 0	Independiente Medellín	26811	Apertura Tournament 1973
74	Independiente Medellín	1 – 2	Atlético Nacional	September 23, 1973	Finalización Tournament 1973
75	Atlético Nacional	0 – 1	Independiente Medellín	November 25, 1973	Finalización Tournament 1973
76	Atlético Nacional	1 – 0	Independiente Medellín	March 3, 1974	Apertura Tournament 1974
77	Independiente Medellín	0 – 3	Atlético Nacional	27168	Apertura Tournament 1974
78	Atlético Nacional	1 – 1	Independiente Medellín	July 21, 1974	Finalización Tournament 1974
79	Independiente Medellín	1 – 1	Atlético Nacional	October 13, 1974	Finalización Tournament 1974
80	Atlético Nacional	3 – 3	Independiente Medellín	April 20, 1975	Apertura Tournament 1975
81	Independiente Medellín	0 – 0	Atlético Nacional	June 26, 1975	Apertura Tournament 1975
82	Atlético Nacional	0 – 1	Independiente Medellín	August 24, 1975	Finalización Tournament 1975
83	Atlético Nacional	1 – 1	Independiente Medellín	September 7, 1975	Finalización Tournament 1975
84	Independiente Medellín	0 – 1	Atlético Nacional	November 2, 1975	Finalización Tournament 1975
85	Independiente Medellín	1 – 4	Atlético Nacional	February 22, 1976	Apertura Tournament 1976
86	Atlético Nacional	1 – 0	Independiente Medellín	27896	Apertura Tournament 1976
87	Independiente Medellín	1 – 1	Atlético Nacional	August 29, 1976	Finalización Tournament 1976
88	Atlético Nacional	2 – 1	Independiente Medellín	September 26, 1976	Finalización Tournament 1976
89	Atlético Nacional	6 – 0	Independiente Medellín	November 4, 1976	Finalización Tournament 1976
90	Independiente Medellín	3 – 2	Atlético Nacional	April 21, 1977	Apertura Tournament 1977
91	Atlético Nacional	4 – 3	Independiente Medellín	July 3, 1977	Apertura Tournament 1977
92	Atlético Nacional	2 – 1	Independiente Medellín	August 7, 1977	Finalización Tournament 1977
93	Atlético Nacional	1 – 1	Independiente Medellín	September 18, 1977	Finalización Tournament 1977
94	Independiente Medellín	0 – 1	Atlético Nacional	October 19, 1977	Finalización Tournament 1977
95	Independiente Medellín	0 – 2	Atlético Nacional	April 5, 1978	Apertura Tournament 1978
96	Atlético Nacional	1 – 0	Independiente Medellín	28638	Apertura Tournament 1978
97	Atlético Nacional	1 – 0	Independiente Medellín	July 30, 1978	Finalización Tournament 1978
98	Independiente Medellín	1 – 2	Atlético Nacional	September 10, 1978	Finalización Tournament 1978
99	Independiente Medellín	0 – 3	Atlético Nacional	December 12, 1978	Finalización Tournament 1978
100	Independiente Medellín	0 – 0	Atlético Nacional	February 25, 1979	Apertura Tournament 1979
101	Atlético Nacional	1 – 5	Independiente Medellín	April 29, 1979	Apertura Tournament 1979
102	Independiente Medellín	1 – 1	Atlético Nacional	July 15, 1979	Finalización Tournament 1979
103	Atlético Nacional	1 – 2	Independiente Medellín	September 9, 1979	Finalización Tournament 1979
104	Atlético Nacional	1 – 1	Independiente Medellín	October 3, 1979	Finalización Tournament 1979
105	Atlético Nacional	1 – 1	Independiente Medellín	29342	Apertura Tournament 1980
106	Independiente Medellín	0 – 1	Atlético Nacional	July 13, 1980	Apertura Tournament 1980
107	Atlético Nacional	0 – 0	Independiente Medellín	August 27, 1980	Finalización Tournament 1980
108	Independiente Medellín	2 – 1	Atlético Nacional	October 26, 1980	Finalización Tournament 1980
109	Atlético Nacional	1 – 1	Independiente Medellín	March 29, 1981	Apertura Tournament 1981
110	Independiente Medellín	1 – 2	Atlético Nacional	June 21, 1981	Apertura Tournament 1981
111	Independiente Medellín	0 – 0	Atlético Nacional	August 19, 1981	Finalización Tournament 1981
112	Independiente Medellín	1 – 3	Atlético Nacional	September 5, 1981	Finalización Tournament 1981
113	Atlético Nacional	3 – 4	Independiente Medellín	October 11, 1981	Finalización Tournament 1981
114	Atlético Nacional	3 – 1	Independiente Medellín	March 4, 1982	Apertura Tournament 1982
115	Independiente Medellín	2 – 0	Atlético Nacional	30073	Apertura Tournament 1982
116	Atlético Nacional	2 – 2	Independiente Medellín	August 1, 1982	Finalización Tournament 1982
117	Independiente Medellín	1 – 1	Atlético Nacional	October 3, 1982	Finalización Tournament 1982
118	Independiente Medellín	3 – 1	Atlético Nacional	November 17, 1982	Final Octagonal 1982
119	Atlético Nacional	1 – 0	Independiente Medellín	December 15, 1982	Final Octagonal 1982
120	Independiente Medellín	2 – 0	Atlético Nacional	April 17, 1983	Apertura Tournament 1983
121	Atlético Nacional	1 – 1	Independiente Medellín	30461	Apertura Tournament 1983
122	Independiente Medellín	0 – 3	Atlético Nacional	July 3, 1983	Finalización Tournament 1983
123	Atlético Nacional	0 – 0	Independiente Medellín	October 2, 1983	Finalización Tournament 1983
124	Independiente Medellín	0 – 0	Atlético Nacional	November 9, 1983	Final Octagonal 1983
125	Atlético Nacional	1 – 1	Independiente Medellín	December 8, 1983	Final Octagonal 1983
126	Atlético Nacional	2 – 0	Independiente Medellín	March 22, 1984	Apertura Tournament 1984
127	Independiente Medellín	0 – 1	Atlético Nacional	April 8, 1984	Apertura Tournament 1984
128	Independiente Medellín	1 – 1	Atlético Nacional	June 9, 1984	Finalización Tournament 1984
129	Atlético Nacional	1 – 1	Independiente Medellín	August 19, 1984	Finalización Tournament 1984
130	Independiente Medellín	1 – 1	Atlético Nacional	November 7, 1984	Final Octagonal 1984
131	Atlético Nacional	1 – 0	Independiente Medellín	December 5, 1984	Final Octagonal 1984
132	Independiente Medellín	1 – 3	Atlético Nacional	April 21, 1985	Apertura Tournament 1985
133	Atlético Nacional	0 – 1	Independiente Medellín	31196	Apertura Tournament 1985
134	Independiente Medellín	1 – 2	Atlético Nacional	August 25, 1985	Finalización Tournament 1985
135	Atlético Nacional	0 – 0	Independiente Medellín	October 13, 1985	Finalización Tournament 1985
136	Atlético Nacional	1 – 0	Independiente Medellín	November 13, 1985	Final Octagonal 1985
137	Independiente Medellín	1 – 2	Atlético Nacional	December 11, 1985	Final Octagonal 1985
138	Independiente Medellín	2 – 1	Atlético Nacional	March 16, 1986	Apertura Tournament 1986
139	Atlético Nacional	0 – 2	Independiente Medellín	31533	Apertura Tournament 1986
140	Independiente Medellín	0 – 0	Atlético Nacional	August 27, 1986	Finalización Tournament 1986
141	Atlético Nacional	1 – 1	Independiente Medellín	October 26, 1986	Finalización Tournament 1986
142	Independiente Medellín	0 – 0	Atlético Nacional	November 2, 1986	Final Octagonal 1986
143	Atlético Nacional	0 – 0	Independiente Medellín	November 30, 1986	Final Octagonal 1986
144	Atlético Nacional	1 – 2	Independiente Medellín	March 15, 1987	Apertura Tournament 1987
145	Independiente Medellín	0 – 2	Atlético Nacional	31924	Apertura Tournament 1987
146	Atlético Nacional	1 – 0	Independiente Medellín	July 26, 1987	Finalización Tournament 1987
147	Independiente Medellín	0 – 0	Atlético Nacional	September 27, 1987	Finalización Tournament 1987
148	Atlético Nacional	4 – 0	Independiente Medellín	December 9, 1987	Final Octagonal 1987
149	Independiente Medellín	1 – 6	Atlético Nacional	December 9, 1987	Final Octagonal 1987
150	Atlético Nacional	2 – 1	Independiente Medellín	February 21, 1988	Apertura Tournament 1988
151	Independiente Medellín	1 – 2	Atlético Nacional	March 20, 1988	Apertura Tournament 1988
152	Atlético Nacional	3 – 0	Independiente Medellín	June 8, 1988	Finalización Tournament 1988
153	Independiente Medellín	0 – 0	Atlético Nacional	October 23, 1988	Finalización Tournament 1988
154	Independiente Medellín	1 – 1	Atlético Nacional	April 2, 1989	Apertura Tournament 1989
155	Atlético Nacional	1 – 1	Independiente Medellín	June 3, 1989	Colombia Cup 1989
156	Independiente Medellín	1 – 0	Atlético Nacional	June 5, 1989	Colombia Cup 1989
157	Atlético Nacional	1 – 0	Independiente Medellín	August 6, 1989	Finalización Tournament 1989
158	Atlético Nacional	1 – 0	Independiente Medellín	November 5, 1989	Repechage Quadrangular 1989
159	Independiente Medellín	2 – 2	Atlético Nacional	April 18, 1990	Apertura Tournament 1990
160	Atlético Nacional	2 – 1	Independiente Medellín	32995	Apertura Tournament 1990
161	Atlético Nacional	1 – 1	Independiente Medellín	August 30, 1990	Finalización Tournament 1990
162	Independiente Medellín	3 – 2	Atlético Nacional	October 17, 1990	Finalización Tournament 1990
163	Atlético Nacional	1 – 1	Independiente Medellín	November 7, 1990	Semifinal Quadrangular 1990
164	Independiente Medellín	0 – 0	Atlético Nacional	November 21, 1990	Semifinal Quadrangular 1990
165	Independiente Medellín	2 – 1	Atlético Nacional	February 28, 1991	Apertura Tournament 1991
166	Atlético Nacional	2 – 0	Independiente Medellín	March 21, 1991	Apertura Tournament 1991
167	Independiente Medellín	3 – 1	Atlético Nacional	August 11, 1991	Finalización Tournament 1991
168	Atlético Nacional	2 – 2	Independiente Medellín	September 29, 1991	Finalización Tournament 1991
169	Atlético Nacional	2 – 1	Independiente Medellín	November 13, 1991	Semifinal Quadrangular 1991
170	Independiente Medellín	0 – 2	Atlético Nacional	November 27, 1991	Semifinal Quadrangular 1991
171	Independiente Medellín	1 – 1	Atlético Nacional	February 23, 1992	Apertura Tournament 1992
172	Atlético Nacional	2 – 0	Independiente Medellín	April 26, 1992	Apertura Tournament 1992
173	Atlético Nacional	3 – 1	Independiente Medellín	September 9, 1992	Finalización Tournament 1992
174	Independiente Medellín	2 – 3	Atlético Nacional	November 1, 1992	Finalización Tournament 1992
175	Atlético Nacional	2 – 2	Independiente Medellín	February 21, 1993	Apertura Tournament 1993
176	Independiente Medellín	4 – 3	Atlético Nacional	April 11, 1993	Apertura Tournament 1993
177	Atlético Nacional	1 – 2	Independiente Medellín	August 21, 1993	Finalización Tournament 1993
178	Independiente Medellín	0 – 0	Atlético Nacional	October 17, 1993	Finalización Tournament 1993
179	Independiente Medellín	2 – 4	Atlético Nacional	December 5, 1993	Final Quadrangular 1993
180	Atlético Nacional	0 – 1	Independiente Medellín	December 19, 1993	Final Quadrangular 1993
181	Atlético Nacional	3 – 0	Independiente Medellín	March 23, 1994	Apertura Tournament 1994
182	Independiente Medellín	0 – 0	Atlético Nacional	April 13, 1994	Apertura Tournament 1994
183	Independiente Medellín	0 – 0	Atlético Nacional	34458	Finalización Tournament 1994
184	Atlético Nacional	0 – 0	Independiente Medellín	August 28, 1994	Finalización Tournament 1994
185	Atlético Nacional	2 – 0	Independiente Medellín	November 13, 1994	Semifinal Quadrangular 1994
186	Independiente Medellín	1 – 0	Atlético Nacional	November 27, 1994	Semifinal Quadrangular 1994
187	Atlético Nacional	1 – 1	Independiente Medellín	December 4, 1994	Final Quadrangular 1994
188	Independiente Medellín	0 – 1	Atlético Nacional	December 18, 1994	Final Quadrangular 1994
189	Independiente Medellín	2 – 1	Atlético Nacional	April 5, 1995	Round-robin 1995
190	Atlético Nacional	2 – 1	Independiente Medellín	34850	Round-robin 1995
191	Atlético Nacional	2 – 1	Independiente Medellín	October 7, 1995	Apertura Tournament 1995-96
192	Independiente Medellín	0 – 1	Atlético Nacional	December 3, 1995	Apertura Tournament 1995-96
193	Atlético Nacional	2 – 0	Independiente Medellín	January 21, 1996	Finalización Tournament 1995-96
194	Independiente Medellín	0 – 2	Atlético Nacional	March 17, 1996	Finalización Tournament 1995-96
195	Atlético Nacional	0 – 0	Independiente Medellín	September 8, 1996	Apertura Tournament 1996-97
196	Atlético Nacional	1 – 0	Independiente Medellín	September 15, 1996	Apertura Tournament 1996-97
197	Atlético Nacional	0 – 2	Independiente Medellín	December 8, 1996	Apertura Tournament 1996-97
198	Independiente Medellín	0 – 0	Atlético Nacional	December 11, 1996	Apertura Tournament 1996-97
199	Atlético Nacional	4 – 2	Independiente Medellín	July 9, 1997	Adequacy Tournament 1996-97
200	Independiente Medellín	0 – 2	Atlético Nacional	August 30, 1997	Adequacy Tournament 1996-97
201	Independiente Medellín	0 – 0	Atlético Nacional	February 18, 1998	Round-robin 1998
202	Atlético Nacional	2 – 2	Independiente Medellín	35924	Regional Quadrangular 1998
203	Independiente Medellín	3 – 0	Atlético Nacional	35943	Regional Quadrangular 1998
204	Atlético Nacional	1 – 0	Independiente Medellín	September 9, 1998	Round-robin 1998
205	Atlético Nacional	3 – 2	Independiente Medellín	October 15, 1998	Round-robin 1998
206	Independiente Medellín	1 – 1	Atlético Nacional	November 8, 1998	Round-robin 1998
207	Atlético Nacional	1 – 1	Independiente Medellín	March 24, 1999	Apertura 1999 (Regional Quadrangular)
208	Independiente Medellín	2 – 0	Atlético Nacional	April 7, 1999	Apertura 1999 (Regional Quadrangular)
209	Atlético Nacional	1 – 0	Independiente Medellín	April 29, 1999	Apertura 1999 (Round-robin)
210	Atlético Nacional	1 – 1	Independiente Medellín	June 20, 1999	Finalización 1999 (Regional Quadrangular)
211	Independiente Medellín	0 – 0	Atlético Nacional	October 6, 1999	Finalización 1999 (Regional Quadrangular)
212	Independiente Medellín	1 – 1	Atlético Nacional	November 14, 1999	Finalización 1999 (Round-robin)
213	Independiente Medellín	0 – 0	Atlético Nacional	December 8, 1999	Final Finalización 1999
214	Atlético Nacional	1 – 0	Independiente Medellín	December 12, 1999	Final Finalización 1999
215	Independiente Medellín	3 – 4	Atlético Nacional	April 30, 2000	Apertura 2000 (Round-robin)
216	Atlético Nacional	1 – 2	Independiente Medellín	September 17, 2000	Finalización 2000 (Round-robin)
217	Atlético Nacional	0 – 4	Independiente Medellín	February 18, 2001	Apertura 2001 (Group Octagonal)
218	Independiente Medellín	2 – 1	Atlético Nacional	July 1, 2001	Apertura 2001 (Round-robin)
219	Independiente Medellín	4 – 3	Atlético Nacional	September 6, 2001	Finalización 2001 (Group Octagonal)
220	Atlético Nacional	2 – 0	Independiente Medellín	November 11, 2001	Finalización 2001 (Round-robin)
221	Independiente Medellín	1 – 1	Atlético Nacional	February 13, 2002	Apertura 2002 (Group Hexagonal)
222	Atlético Nacional	1 – 1	Independiente Medellín	March 14, 2002	Apertura 2002 (Round-robin)
223	Atlético Nacional	0 – 0	Independiente Medellín	July 21, 2002	Finalización 2002 (Group Hexagonal)
224	Independiente Medellín	1 – 1	Atlético Nacional	August 24, 2002	Finalización 2002 (Round-robin)
225	Independiente Medellín	1 – 2	Atlético Nacional	March 11, 2003	Apertura 2003 (Round-robin)
226	Atlético Nacional	0 – 1	Independiente Medellín	March 22, 2003	Apertura 2003 (Round-robin)
227	Atlético Nacional	2 – 1	Independiente Medellín	August 9, 2003	Finalización 2003 Round-robin
228	Independiente Medellín	2 – 1	Atlético Nacional	September 13, 2003	Finalización 2003 Round-robin
229	Independiente Medellín	1 – 2	Atlético Nacional	November 22, 2003	Finalización 2003 (Semifinal Quadrangulars)
230	Atlético Nacional	4 – 2	Independiente Medellín	December 6, 2003	Finalización 2003 (Semifinal Quadrangulars)
231	Independiente Medellín	0 – 2	Atlético Nacional	March 20, 2004	Apertura 2004 (Round-robin)
232	Atlético Nacional	0 – 2	Independiente Medellín	38118	Apertura 2004 (Round-robin)
233	Independiente Medellín	2 – 1	Atlético Nacional	June 24, 2004	Apertura 2004 (Final)
234	Atlético Nacional	0 – 0	Independiente Medellín	June 27, 2004	Apertura 2004 (Final)
235	Atlético Nacional	2 – 1	Independiente Medellín	September 9, 2004	Finalización 2004 (Round-robin)
236	Independiente Medellín	0 – 1	Atlético Nacional	October 30, 2004	Finalización 2004 (Round-robin)
237	Independiente Medellín	0 – 4	Atlético Nacional	March 19, 2005	Apertura 2005 (Round-robin)
238	Atlético Nacional	3 – 1	Independiente Medellín	38482	Apertura 2005 (Round-robin)
239	Independiente Medellín	1 – 2	Atlético Nacional	38493	Apertura 2005 (Semifinal Quadrangulars)
240	Atlético Nacional	2 – 1	Independiente Medellín	June 14, 2005	Apertura 2005 (Semifinal Quadrangulars)
241	Atlético Nacional	3 – 2	Independiente Medellín	August 27, 2005	Finalización 2005 (Round-robin)
242	Independiente Medellín	1 – 1	Atlético Nacional	October 29, 2005	Finalización 2005 (Round-robin)
243	Atlético Nacional	2 – 1	Independiente Medellín	March 25, 2006	Apertura 2006 (Round-robin)
244	Independiente Medellín	1 – 1	Atlético Nacional	38853	Apertura 2006 (Round-robin)
245	Independiente Medellín	0 – 1	Atlético Nacional	September 9, 2006	Finalización 2006 (Round-robin)
246	Atlético Nacional	0 – 1	Independiente Medellín	November 4, 2006	Finalización 2006 (Round-robin)
247	Independiente Medellín	2 – 2	Atlético Nacional	March 4, 2007	Apertura 2007 (Round-robin)
248	Atlético Nacional	2 – 2	Independiente Medellín	March 31, 2007	Apertura 2007 (Round-robin)
249	Atlético Nacional	1 – 0	Independiente Medellín	August 18, 2007	Finalización 2007 (Round-robin)
250	Independiente Medellín	1 – 4	Atlético Nacional	September 16, 2007	Finalización 2007 (Round-robin)
251	Atlético Nacional	1 – 0	Independiente Medellín	February 23, 2008	Apertura 2008 (Round-robin)
252	Independiente Medellín	2 – 0	Atlético Nacional	March 23, 2008	Apertura 2008 (Round-robin)
253	Independiente Medellín	0 – 1	Atlético Nacional	August 16, 2008	Finalización 2008 (Round-robin)
254	Atlético Nacional	1 – 2	Independiente Medellín	September 21, 2008	Finalización 2008 (Round-robin)
255	Atlético Nacional	1 – 1	Independiente Medellín	November 27, 2008	Finalización 2008 (Semifinal Quadrangulars)
256	Independiente Medellín	0 – 0	Atlético Nacional	December 10, 2008	Finalización 2008 (Semifinal Quadrangulars)
257	Atlético Nacional	0 – 0	Independiente Medellín	March 22, 2009	Apertura 2009 (Round-robin)
258	Independiente Medellín	1 – 2	Atlético Nacional	39946	Apertura 2009 (Round-robin)
259	Independiente Medellín	3 – 1	Atlético Nacional	September 13, 2009	Finalización 2009 (Round-robin)
260	Atlético Nacional	0 – 0	Independiente Medellín	November 7, 2009	Finalización 2009 (Round-robin)
261	Atlético Nacional	1 – 2	Independiente Medellín	February 7, 2010	Apertura 2010 (Round-robin)
262	Independiente Medellín	2 – 1	Atlético Nacional	April 15, 2010	Apertura 2010 (Round-robin)
263	Atlético Nacional	1 – 0	Independiente Medellín	September 12, 2010	Finalización 2010 (Round-robin)
264	Independiente Medellín	1 – 2	Atlético Nacional	September 29, 2010	Finalización 2010 (Round-robin)
265	Independiente Medellín	2 – 3	Atlético Nacional	April 2, 2011	Apertura 2011 (Round-robin)
266	Atlético Nacional	1 – 0	Independiente Medellín	April 6, 2011	Apertura 2011 (Round-robin)
267	Atlético Nacional	1 – 1	Independiente Medellín	September 28, 2011	Finalización 2011 (Round-robin)
268	Independiente Medellín	0 – 2	Atlético Nacional	October 1, 2011	Finalización 2011 (Round-robin)
269	Atlético Nacional	1 – 2	Independiente Medellín	March 11, 2012	Apertura 2012 (Round-robin)
270	Independiente Medellín	1 – 0	Atlético Nacional	March 25, 2012	Apertura 2012 (Round-robin)
271	Independiente Medellín	0 – 3	Atlético Nacional	September 1, 2012	Finalización 2012 (Round-robin)
272	Atlético Nacional	2 – 2	Independiente Medellín	September 23, 2012	Finalización 2012 (Round-robin)
273	Atlético Nacional	0 – 1	Independiente Medellín	November 21, 2012	Finalización 2012 (Semifinal Quadrangulars)
274	Independiente Medellín	1 – 1	Atlético Nacional	December 6, 2012	Finalización 2012 (Semifinal Quadrangulars)
275	Independiente Medellín	0 – 0	Atlético Nacional	April 6, 2013	Apertura 2013 (Round-robin)
276	Independiente Medellín	2 – 2	Atlético Nacional	April 28, 2013	Apertura 2013 (Round-robin)
277	Atlético Nacional	3 – 0	Independiente Medellín	September 14, 2013	Finalización 2013 (Round-robin)
278	Independiente Medellín	1 – 1	Atlético Nacional	October 2, 2013	Finalización 2013 (Round-robin)
279	Atlético Nacional	3 – 1	Independiente Medellín	January 26, 2014	Apertura 2014 (Round-robin)
280	Independiente Medellín	0 – 2	Atlético Nacional	March 1, 2014	Apertura 2014 (Round-robin)
281	Independiente Medellín	1 – 0	Atlético Nacional	July 19, 2014	Finalización 2014 (Round-robin)
282	Atlético Nacional	1 – 0	Independiente Medellín	September 13, 2014	Finalización 2014 (Round-robin)
283	Independiente Medellín	0 – 1	Atlético Nacional	February 7, 2015	Apertura 2015 (Round-robin)
284	Atlético Nacional	3 – 1	Independiente Medellín	March 15, 2015	Apertura 2015 (Round-robin)
285	Atlético Nacional	0 – 0	Independiente Medellín	July 18, 2015	Finalización 2015 (Round-robin)
286	Independiente Medellín	1 – 0	Atlético Nacional	September 5, 2015	Finalización 2015 (Round-robin)
287	Independiente Medellín	1 – 0	Atlético Nacional	December 10, 2015	Finalización 2015 (Semifinal)
288	Atlético Nacional	2 – 0	Independiente Medellín	December 13, 2015	Finalización 2015 (Semifinal)
289	Independiente Medellín	1 – 1	Atlético Nacional	March 20, 2016	Apertura 2016 (Round-robin)
290	Atlético Nacional	1 – 2	Independiente Medellín	42497	Apertura 2016 (Round-robin)
291	Atlético Nacional	1 – 0	Independiente Medellín	August 28, 2016	Finalización 2016 (Round-robin)
292	Independiente Medellín	2 – 2	Atlético Nacional	October 22, 2016	Finalización 2016 (Round-robin)
293	Atlético Nacional	3 – 1	Independiente Medellín	March 18, 2017	Apertura 2017 (Round-robin)
294	Independiente Medellín	4 – 3	Atlético Nacional	42883	Apertura 2017 (Round-robin)
295	Independiente Medellín	1 – 0	Atlético Nacional	August 26, 2017	Finalización 2017 (Round-robin)
296	Atlético Nacional	0 – 0	Independiente Medellín	November 18, 2017	Finalización 2017 (Round-robin)
297	Atlético Nacional	2 – 0	Independiente Medellín	April 8, 2018	Apertura 2018 (Round-robin)
298	Independiente Medellín	2 – 1	Atlético Nacional	October 6, 2018	Finalización 2018 (Round-robin)
299	Independiente Medellín	2 – 2	Atlético Nacional	March 16, 2019	Apertura 2019 (Round-robin)
300	Atlético Nacional	1 – 0	Independiente Medellín	April 24, 2019	Apertura 2019 (Round-robin)
301	Atlético Nacional	5 – 2	Independiente Medellín	August 25, 2019	Finalización 2019 (Round-robin)
302	Independiente Medellín	1 – 4	Atlético Nacional	September 8, 2019	Finalización 2019 (Round-robin)
303	Independiente Medellín	1 – 3	Atlético Nacional	February 22, 2020	Round-robin 2020
304	Atlético Nacional	1 – 1	Independiente Medellín	February 29, 2020	Round-robin 2020
305	Independiente Medellín	0 – 0	Atlético Nacional	March 27, 2021	Apertura 2021 (Round-robin)
306	Atlético Nacional	1 – 1	Independiente Medellín	October 16, 2021	Finalización 2021 (Round-robin)
307	Independiente Medellín	0 – 0	Atlético Nacional	November 14, 2021	Finalización 2021 (Round-robin)
308	Atlético Nacional	2 – 0	Independiente Medellín	March 6, 2022	Apertura 2022 (Round-robin)
309	Independiente Medellín	0 – 0	Atlético Nacional	April 30, 2022	Apertura 2022 (Round-robin)
310	Independiente Medellín	4 – 3	Atlético Nacional	September 4, 2022	Finalización 2022 (Round-robin)
311	Atlético Nacional	3 – 2	Independiente Medellín	October 6, 2022	Finalización 2022 (Round-robin)
312	Atlético Nacional	1 – 1	Independiente Medellín	March 25, 2023	Apertura 2023 (Round-robin)
313	Independiente Medellín	1 – 3	Atlético Nacional	April 29, 2023	Apertura 2023 (Round-robin)
314	Independiente Medellín	1 – 0	Atlético Nacional	September 9, 2023	Finalización 2023 (Round-robin)
315	Atlético Nacional	1 – 2	Independiente Medellín	October 14, 2023	Finalización 2023 (Round-robin)
316	Independiente Medellín	2 – 1	Atlético Nacional	November 19, 2023	Finalización 2023 (Semifinal Quadrangulars)
317	Atlético Nacional	0 – 5	Independiente Medellín	December 3, 2023	Finalización 2023 (Semifinal Quadrangulars)
318	Independiente Medellín	2 – 2	Atlético Nacional	April 21, 2024	Apertura 2024 (Round-robin)
319	Atlético Nacional	1 – 1	Independiente Medellín	November 11, 2024	Finalización 2024 (Round-robin)
320	Atlético Nacional	1 – 1	Independiente Medellín	March 23, 2025	Apertura 2025 (Round-robin)
321	Independiente Medellín	1 – 1	Atlético Nacional	45781	Apertura 2025 (Round-robin)
322	Independiente Medellín	3 – 3	Atlético Nacional	September 7, 2025	Finalización 2025 (Round-robin)
323	Atlético Nacional	5 – 2	Independiente Medellín	October 26, 2025	Finalización 2025 (Round-robin)
324	Independiente Medellín	0 – 0	Atlético Nacional	November 23, 2025	Finalización 2025 (Semifinal Quadrangular)
325	Atlético Nacional	2 – 1	Independiente Medellín	December 04, 2025	Finalización 2025 (Semifinal Quadrangular)
326	Independiente Medellín	2 – 3	Atlético Nacional	April 11, 2026	Apertura 2026 (Round-robin)

+/-
+ 1
+ 2
+ 2
+ 3
+ 4
+ 3
+ 3
+ 4
+ 4
+ 3
+ 4
+ 5
+ 4
+ 4
+ 5
+ 6
+ 5
+ 6
+ 6
+ 5
+ 4
+ 5
+ 6
+ 7
+ 6
+ 7
+ 6
+ 6
+ 7
+ 8
+ 7
+ 6
+ 7
+ 7
+ 8
+ 9
+ 9
+ 10
+ 9
+ 10
+ 9
+ 10
+ 9
+ 9
+ 9
+ 8
+ 9
+ 10
+ 9
+ 10
+ 11
+ 10
+ 9
+ 10
+ 10
+ 11
+ 11
+ 10
+ 11
+ 12
+ 11
+ 12
+ 11
+ 12
+ 13
+ 14
+ 14
+ 14
+ 15
+ 14
+ 14
+ 14
+ 13
+ 12
+ 13
+ 12
+ 11
+ 11
+ 11
+ 11
+ 11
+ 12
+ 12
+ 11
+ 10
+ 9
+ 9
+ 8
+ 7
+ 8
+ 7
+ 6
+ 6
+ 5
+ 4
+ 3
+ 2
+ 1
0
0
+ 1
+ 1
+ 2
+ 2
+ 2
+ 1
+ 1
+ 2
+ 2
+ 1
+ 1
0
+ 1
0
+ 1
+ 1
+ 1
+ 2
+ 1
+ 2
+ 2
+ 1
+ 1
+ 1
+ 1
0
+ 1
+ 1
+ 1
+ 1
+ 2
+ 3
+ 2
+ 3
+ 3
+ 4
+ 5
+ 4
+ 3
+ 3
+ 3
+ 3
+ 3
+ 2
+ 3
+ 4
+ 4
+ 5
+ 6
+ 7
+ 8
+ 9
+ 9
+ 9
+ 9
+ 8
+ 9
+ 10
+ 10
+ 11
+ 11
+ 10
+ 10
+ 10
+ 9
+ 10
+ 9
+ 9
+ 10
+ 11
+ 11
+ 12
+ 13
+ 14
+ 14
+ 13
+ 12
+ 12
+ 13
+ 12
+ 13
+ 13
+ 13
+ 13
+ 14
+ 13
+ 13
+ 14
+ 13
+ 14
+ 15
+ 16
+ 17
+ 18
+ 18
+ 19
+ 18
+ 18
+ 19
+ 20
+ 20
+ 20
+ 19
+ 20
+ 21
+ 21
+ 21
+ 20
+ 21
+ 21
+ 21
+ 21
+ 21
+ 22
+ 23
+ 22
+ 21
+ 20
+ 19
+ 20
+ 20
+ 20
+ 20
+ 20
+ 21
+ 20
+ 21
+ 20
+ 21
+ 22
+ 23
+ 22
+ 21
+ 21
+ 22
+ 23
+ 24
+ 25
+ 26
+ 27
+ 28
+ 28
+ 29
+ 29
+ 30
+ 29
+ 29
+ 29
+ 30
+ 31
+ 32
+ 31
+ 32
+ 31
+ 31
+ 31
+ 31
+ 32
+ 31
+ 31
+ 30
+ 29
+ 30
+ 31
+ 32
+ 33
+ 33
+ 34
+ 33
+ 32
+ 33
+ 33
+ 32
+ 32
+ 32
+ 32
+ 33
+ 33
+ 34
+ 35
+ 34
+ 35
+ 36
+ 37
+ 37
+ 36
+ 35
+ 36
+ 36
+ 35
+ 36
+ 36
+ 37
+ 36
+ 35
+ 35
+ 36
+ 35
+ 35
+ 36
+ 37
+ 38
+ 39
+ 39
+ 39
+ 39
+ 39
+ 40
+ 40
+ 39
+ 40
+ 40
+ 41
+ 40
+ 39
+ 38
+ 37
+ 37
+ 37
+ 37
+ 37
+ 37
+ 38
+ 38
+ 39
+ 40

=== Official matches for the colombian cup ===
N°	Local Team	Result	Visiting Team	Date	Phase
1	Independiente Medellín	2 – 1	Atlético Nacional	December 19, 1956	Colombia Cup 1956-57
2	Atlético Nacional	3 – 1	Independiente Medellín	April 9, 2008	Colombia Cup (Group stage)
3	Independiente Medellín	1 – 0	Atlético Nacional	July 30, 2008	Colombia Cup (Group stage)
4	Atlético Nacional	3 – 3	Independiente Medellín	April 16, 2009	Colombia Cup (Group stage)
5	Independiente Medellín	2 – 0	Atlético Nacional	August 5, 2009	Colombia Cup (Group stage)
6	Independiente Medellín	2 – 1	Atlético Nacional	April 28, 2010	Colombia Cup (Group stage)
7	Atlético Nacional	0 – 0	Independiente Medellín	August 4, 2010	Colombia Cup (Group stage)
8	Independiente Medellín	5 – 1	Atlético Nacional	June 27, 2011	Colombia Cup (Group stage)
9	Atlético Nacional	1 – 1	Independiente Medellín	July 7, 2011	Colombia Cup (Group stage)
10	Independiente Medellín	1 – 2	Atlético Nacional	April 12, 2012	Colombia Cup (Group stage)
11	Atlético Nacional	2 – 1	Independiente Medellín	June 9, 2012	Colombia Cup (Group stage)
12	Atlético Nacional	5 – 2	Independiente Medellín	March 14, 2013	Colombia Cup (Group stage)
13	Independiente Medellín	2 – 0	Atlético Nacional	41409	Colombia Cup (Group stage)
14	Independiente Medellín	2 – 1	Atlético Nacional	July 6, 2014	Colombia Cup (Group stage)
15	Atlético Nacional	3 – 0	Independiente Medellín	August 13, 2014	Colombia Cup (Group stage)
16	Atlético Nacional	2 – 0	Independiente Medellín	October 31, 2024	Colombia Cup (Semifinal)
17	Independiente Medellín	1 – 0	Atlético Nacional	November 17, 2024	Colombia Cup (Semifinal)
18	Atlético Nacional	0 – 0	Independiente Medellín	December 13, 2025	Colombia Cup (Final)
19	Independiente Medellín	0 – 1	Atlético Nacional	December 17, 2025	Colombia Cup (Final)

=== Big Wins ===
Atlético Nacional goal routs

- Atlético Nacional 7 – 2 Independiente Medellín, Campeonato Colombiano 1959.
- Atlético Nacional 5 – 2 Independiente Medellín, Campeonato Colombiano 1961.
- Atlético Nacional 3 – 0 Independiente Medellín, Campeonato Colombiano 1969.
- Independiente Medellín 0 – 3 Atlético Nacional, Campeonato Colombiano 1974.
- Independiente Medellín 1 – 4 Atlético Nacional, Campeonato Colombiano 1976.
- Atlético Nacional 6 – 0 Independiente Medellín, Campeonato Colombiano 1976.
- Independiente Medellín 0 – 3 Atlético Nacional, Campeonato Colombiano 1978.
- Independiente Medellín 0 – 3 Atlético Nacional, Campeonato Colombiano 1983.
- Atlético Nacional 4 – 0 Independiente Medellín, Campeonato Colombiano 1987.
- Independiente Medellín 1 – 6 Atlético Nacional, Campeonato Colombiano 1987.
- Atlético Nacional 3 – 0 Independiente Medellín, Campeonato Colombiano 1988.
- Atlético Nacional 3 – 0 Independiente Medellín, Campeonato Colombiano 1994.
- Independiente Medellín 0 – 4 Atlético Nacional, Torneo Apertura 2005.
- Independiente Medellín 1 – 4 Atlético Nacional, Torneo Finalización 2007.
- Independiente Medellín 0 – 3 Atlético Nacional, Torneo Finalización 2012.
- Atlético Nacional 5 – 2 Independiente Medellín, Copa Colombia 2013.
- Atlético Nacional 3 – 0 Independiente Medellín, Torneo Finalización 2013.
- Atlético Nacional 3 – 0 Independiente Medellín, Copa Colombia 2014.
- Atlético Nacional 5 – 2 Independiente Medellín, Torneo Finalización 2019.
- Independiente Medellín 1 – 4 Atlético Nacional, Torneo Finalización 2019.
- Atlético Nacional 5 – 2 Independiente Medellín, Torneo Finalización 2025.

Independiente Medellín goal routs

- Atlético Municipal 0 – 3 Independiente Medellín, Campeonato Colombiano 1948.
- Independiente Medellín 3 – 0 Atlético Nacional, Campeonato Colombiano 1959.
- Atlético Nacional 0 – 3 Independiente Medellín, Campeonato Colombiano 1959.
- Atlético Nacional 0 – 3 Independiente Medellín, Campeonato Colombiano 1960.
- Atlético Nacional 0 – 3 Independiente Medellín, Campeonato Colombiano 1961.
- Independiente Medellín 3 – 0 Atlético Nacional, Campeonato Colombiano 1961.
- Independiente Medellín 3 – 0 Atlético Nacional, Campeonato Colombiano 1963.
- Atlético Nacional 1 – 4 Independiente Medellín, Campeonato Colombiano 1965.
- Independiente Medellín 4 – 0 Atlético Nacional, Campeonato Colombiano 1970.
- Atlético Nacional 1 – 5 Independiente Medellín, Campeonato Colombiano 1979.
- Independiente Medellín 3 – 0 Atlético Nacional, Campeonato Colombiano 1998.
- Atlético Nacional 0 – 4 Independiente Medellín, Campeonato Colombiano 2001.
- Independiente Medellín 5 – 1 Atlético Nacional, Copa Colombia 2011.
- Atlético Nacional 0 – 5 Independiente Medellín, Torneo Finalización 2023.

=== Honours ===
Major honours won
Competition	Atlético Nacional	Independiente Medellín
Categoría Primera A	18	6
Copa Colombia	8	3
Superliga Colombiana	4	0
Copa Libertadores	2	0
Recopa Sudamericana	1	0
Copa Merconorte	2	0
Copa Interamericana	2	0
Total	37	9

== Supporters ==
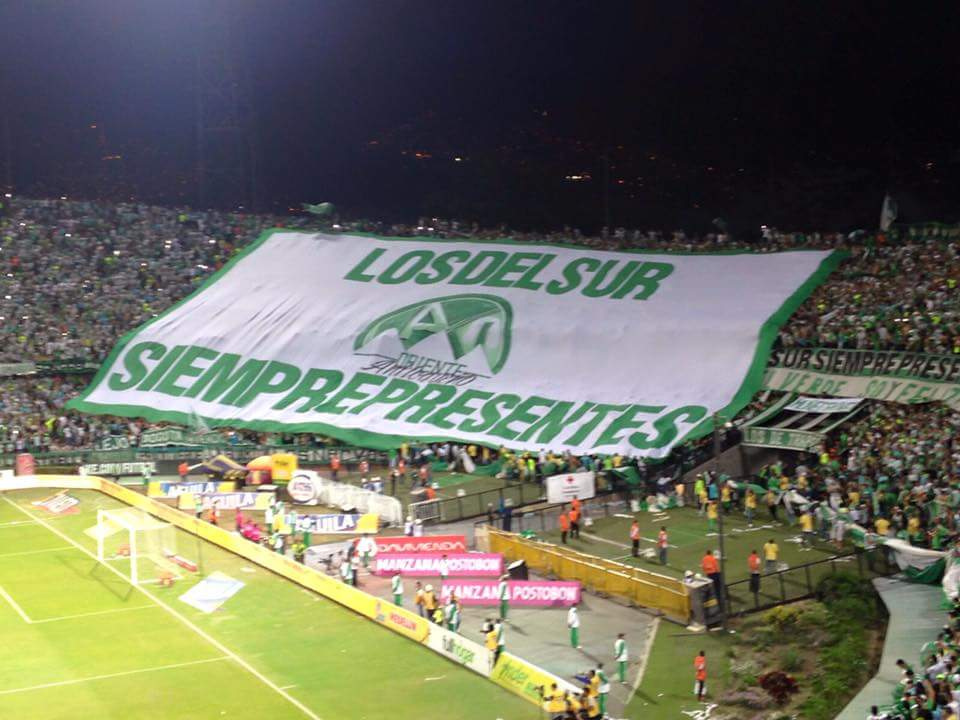
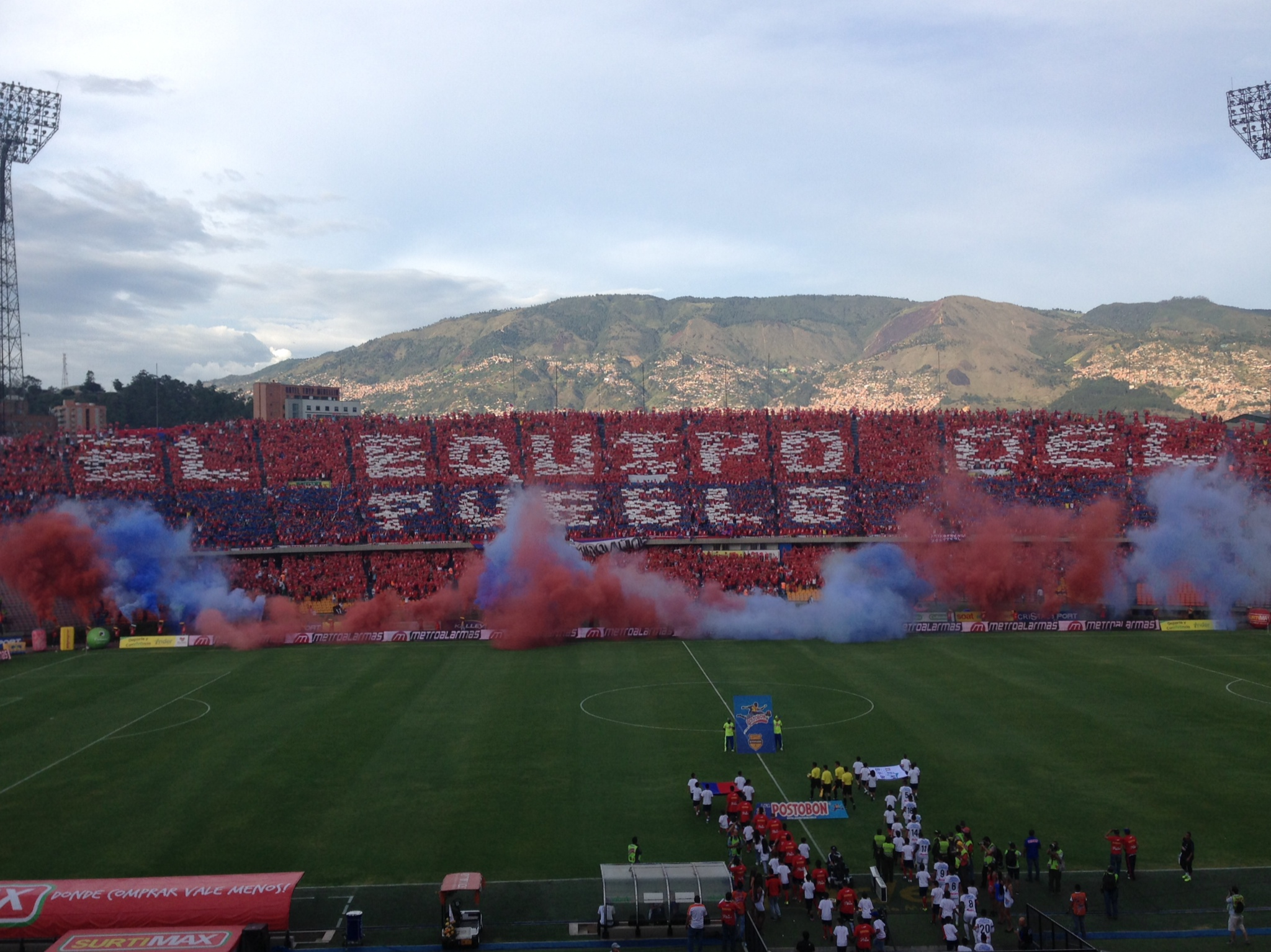
Shows of support by fans of both teams

Atlético Nacional is one of the most supported clubs in the country, with a large percentage of their supporters coming from other parts of the country. Whilst Independiente Medellín does not have as much support, it is well supported throughout the city, especially in the comunas, which is why it is often referred to as "El Equipo del Pueblo" (the people's team). Their fans are characterized as very loyal, due to the long trophy droughts the club has been through, and they usually create large tifos before derby matches.

Independiente Medellín is usually one of the clubs with the most ticket sales in the league. In 2022, despite not being a "big" club with lots of history and success, it had more ticket sales than other more popular clubs such as América de Cali and Millonarios and only falling short to their crosstown rivals Nacional. A study revealing the 50 South American clubs with the highest attendance between 2009-2019 had Medellin 19th in South America and second in Colombia behind Nacional.
