= Nelson Flórez =

Colombian footballer and manager (born 1974)

Personal information
- Full name: Nelson Alfonso Flórez Jiménez
- Date of birth: 1 March 1974 (age 52)
- Place of birth: Bogotá, Colombia
- Height: 1.74 m (5 ft 9 in)
- Position: Midfielder

Team information
- Current team: Inter Palmira (manager)

Youth career
- 1987–1993: Santa Fe

Senior career*
Years	Team	Apps	(Gls)
1993–1998	Santa Fe		
1999	Millonarios	16	(2)
1999–2000	Atlético Nacional	31	(3)
2001	Deportivo Pasto		
2001	Santa Fe		
2002–2003	Deportivo Pereira	33	(1)
2004	Deportivo Pasto		
2005	Santa Fe		
2006–2008	Cúcuta Deportivo	89	(2)
2009–2010	Academia	18	(5)

International career
1993	Colombia U20	2	(0)

Managerial career
- 2013–2015: Santa Fe (youth)
- 2016–2020: Millonarios (youth)
- 2018–2020: Colombia U20 (assistant)
- 2018: Colombia (assistant)
- 2020: Colombia U23 (assistant)
- 2021–2022: Fortaleza CEIF
- 2023–2025: Barranquilla
- 2025–2026: Cúcuta Deportivo
- 2026–: Inter Palmira
- * Club domestic league appearances and goals

Nelson Alfonso Flórez Jiménez (born 1 March 1974) is a Colombian football manager and former footballer who played as a midfielder, currently in charge of Inter Palmira.

== Club career ==
Born in Bogotá, Flórez joined Independiente Santa Fe's youth sides at the age of 13, and made his first team debut in 1993, aged 19. During his first spell at the club, he was mainly used as a right-back.

In 1999, Flórez moved to Millonarios, but signed for Atlético Nacional shortly after. Ahead of the 2001 season, he agreed to a deal with Deportivo Pasto, but subsequently returned to Santa Fe.

In 2002, Flórez joined Deportivo Pereira. He returned to Pasto in 2004, before rejoining Santa Fe for a third spell in the following year.

In 2006, Flórez moved to Cúcuta Deportivo, and managed to play in two editions of the Copa Libertadores with the club. He signed for Academia in 2009, and retired with the club in the following year, aged 36.

== International career ==
Flórez was a part of the Colombia national under-20 team in the 1993 FIFA World Youth Championship in Australia.

== Managerial career ==
After retiring, Flórez returned to his first club Santa Fe as a manager of the youth sides. In 2016, he moved to another club he represented as a player, Millonarios, to become their under-20 manager.

In 2018, while working at Millonarios, Flórez became the assistant of Arturo Reyes at the Colombia national under-20 team. He left the role in February 2020, after being behind Reyes at the full side (in an interim manner) and at the under-23 team.

On 8 December 2020, Flórez was appointed manager of Categoría Primera B side Fortaleza CEIF. After narrowly missing out promotion in the last round of the Torneo II semi-finals, he cried during the post-match interview after knowing the Llaneros v Unión Magdalena controversy, but remained in charge in the following campaign, where he also missed out promotion in the semi-finals.

On 22 November 2022, Flórez was named Barranquilla FC manager. On 28 March 2025, he was sacked after a poor start of the year.

On 28 August 2025, Flórez returned to Cúcuta, now as manager. He won the 2025 Torneo II, leading the club back to the Categoría Primera A after a five-year absence, but was dismissed on 3 February 2026 after two draws and two losses in the start of the 2026 Apertura tournament.

On 14 August 2026, Flórez was appointed manager of Primera B club Inter Palmira.

== Honours ==
=== Player ===
Cúcuta Deportivo

- Categoría Primera A: 2006 Finalización

=== Manager ===
Cúcuta Deportivo

- Categoría Primera B: 2025 Torneo II
