= Argentina v Colombia (1994 FIFA World Cup qualification) =

Argentina v Colombia (1993)
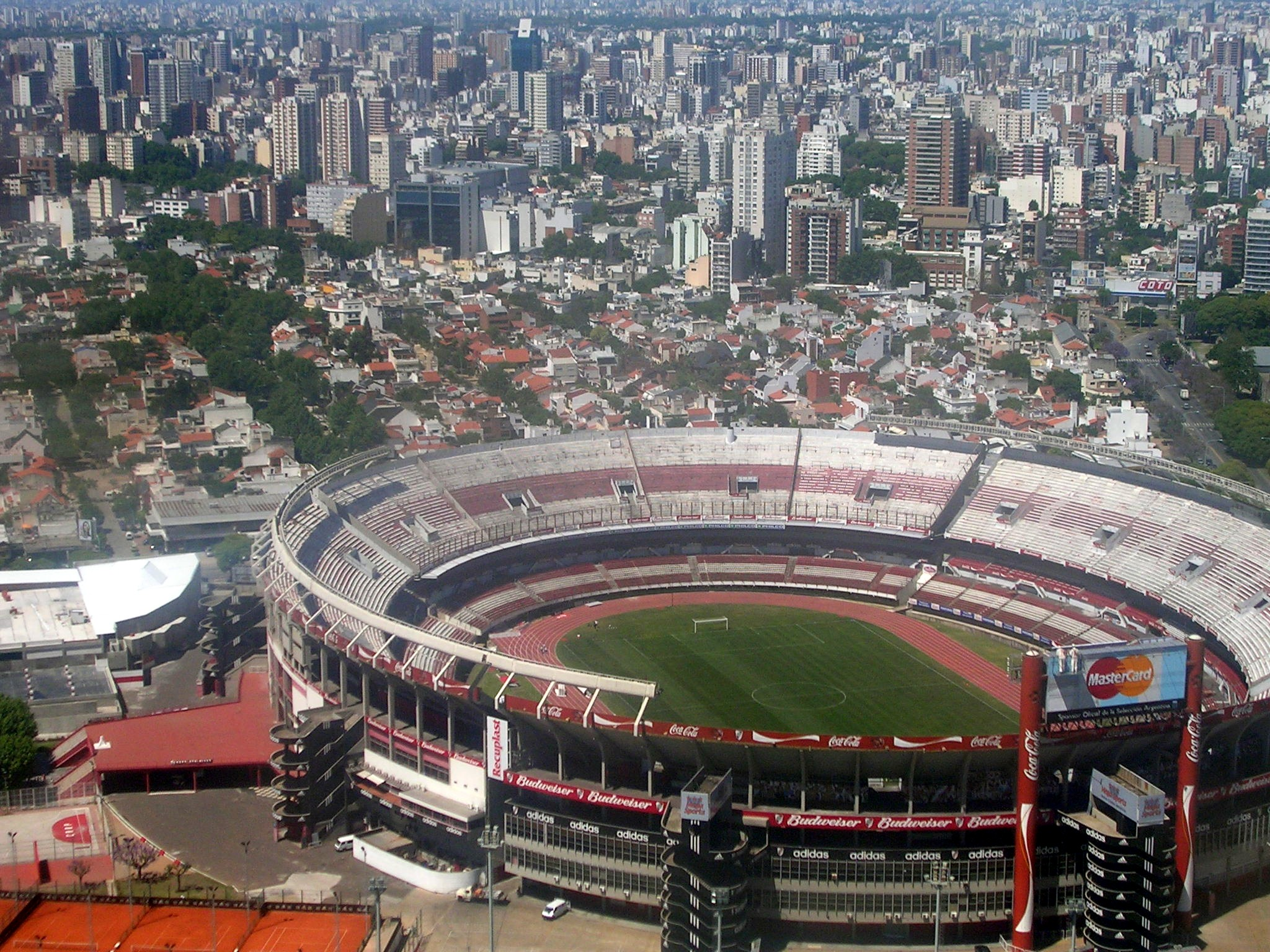
- The Estadio Monumental, venue of the match
- Event: 1994 FIFA World Cup qualification - South American zone - group 1
Argentina	Colombia
(Argentina)	(Colombia)
0	5
- Colombia qualify for the 1994 FIFA World Cup
- Date: 5 September 1993
- Venue: Estadio Monumental, Buenos Aires
- Referee: Ernesto Filippi (Uruguay)
- Attendance: 75,000

Argentina 0–5 Colombia was an association football match played on 5 September 1993 at the Estadio Monumental in Buenos Aires as part of the final round of South American qualifiers for the 1994 FIFA World Cup.

Entering the match, Colombia only needed either a win or a draw in order to qualify, while Argentina required a win to avoid the inter-confederation play-offs. Nevertheless, the latter were still considered overwhelming favorites by most observers, as they were in the midst of a 33-match unbeaten streak at home and two back-to-back Copa América titles in 1991 and 1993.

The match, however, ended in a dominant Colombian victory. The result equalled Argentina's single largest margin of defeat alongside their 6-1 defeat to Czechoslovakia in the 1958 World Cup. Colombia's performance later led to Brazilian legend Pelé naming them as his favorites to win the upcoming 1994 World Cup. Argentina would still eventually qualify by beating Australia in the inter-confederation play-offs, however the match is often considered one of the biggest upsets in international football and the greatest success achieved by the Colombian national team.

== Before the game ==
The situation of the group before the game was as follows:

Team	Pld	W	D	L	GF	GA	GD	Pts	Qualification
Colombia	5	3	2	0	8	2	+6	8	World Cup
Argentina	5	3	1	1	7	4	+3	7	Inter-confederation play-offs
Paraguay	5	1	3	1	4	5	–1	5	
Peru (E)	5	0	0	5	2	10	–8	0	

(E) = Eliminated

Colombia sat first in the group with 8 points, a product of two draws and three wins (at that time, a win gave two points instead of three). Argentina followed behind in second place, with seven points, a product of three wins, one draw and one defeat.

Permutations were as follows:

- Colombia would qualify by avoiding defeat.
- Argentina would qualify by defeating Colombia.
- Paraguay couldn’t qualify directly but could qualify for the inter-continental play-off should they defeat Peru and Colombia defeat Argentina.
- Peru was eliminated.

Both teams had met in the first leg in Barranquilla (15 August 1993) with a 2–1 victory for Colombia. The scorers for Colombia were Iván Valenciano and Adolfo "Tren" Valencia; Argentina scored one goal by Ramón Medina Bello.

== The match ==
The match began with insults and slander by the Argentinian fans towards the Colombian team. A few days before the crucial match, Diego Maradona launched a phrase during a television interview: while putting palms of the hands parallel to the ground at chest height, one above the other, said "You can't change history, history shouldn't be changed: Argentina up, Colombia down."

The Argentinian team began dominating the match with several arrivals with danger of goal, but the Colombian goalkeeper Oscar Córdoba perfectly conjured Argentinian options. When the Argentinian goal seemed sure to come, Colombia began to control the game and at halftime was winning 1–0, thanks to the speed and accuracy of the player Freddy Rincón after a precise pass from Carlos Valderrama in the minute 41.

For the second half Colombia took Argentina's need and scored the other four goals, as follows:

- 49': Faustino Asprilla (0–2)
- 72': Freddy Rincón, after a pass form Leonel Álvarez. (0–3)
- 74': Faustino Asprilla, after a failed Argentina's ball delivery in midfield. (0–4)
- 84': Adolfo Valencia, after a pass from Asprilla. (0–5)

=== Match details ===
5 September 1993

Argentina	0–5	Colombia
	report	Rincón 41', 72'; Asprilla 49', 74'; Valencia 84'

Monumental Stadium, Buenos Aires
Attendance: 53,000
Referee: Ernesto Filippi (Uruguay)

Argentina	Colombia

GK	1	Sergio Goycochea
RB	14	Julio Saldaña
CB	15	Jorge Borelli
CB	6	Oscar Ruggeri (c)
LB	3	Ricardo Altamirano
CM	10	Diego Simeone
CM	5	Fernando Redondo	(substituted off) 69'
CM	17	Gustavo Zapata
AM	20	Leonardo Rodríguez	(substituted off) 54'
CF	18	Ramón Medina Bello
CF	9	Gabriel Batistuta
Substitutions:
FW	16	Claudio García	(substituted on) 54'
FW	19	Alberto Acosta	(substituted on) 69'
Manager:
Alfio Basile

GK	1	Oscar Córdoba
RB	4	Luis Herrera
CB	15	Luis Carlos Perea
CB	3	Alexis Mendoza
LB	20	Wilson Pérez
DM	14	Leonel Álvarez
CM	6	Gabriel Gómez
CM	19	Freddy Rincón
AM	10	Carlos Valderrama (c)
CF	13	Adolfo Valencia
CF	11	Faustino Asprilla
Manager:
Francisco Maturana

Assistant referees:
(Uruguay) Pedro Risso
(Uruguay) Juan Kerekes

== Aftermath ==
As a result of the match, Colombia automatically qualified for the 1994 FIFA World Cup, while Argentina were paired against Australia in the inter-confederation playoffs after Paraguay drew with last-place Peru on 9 September in Lima.

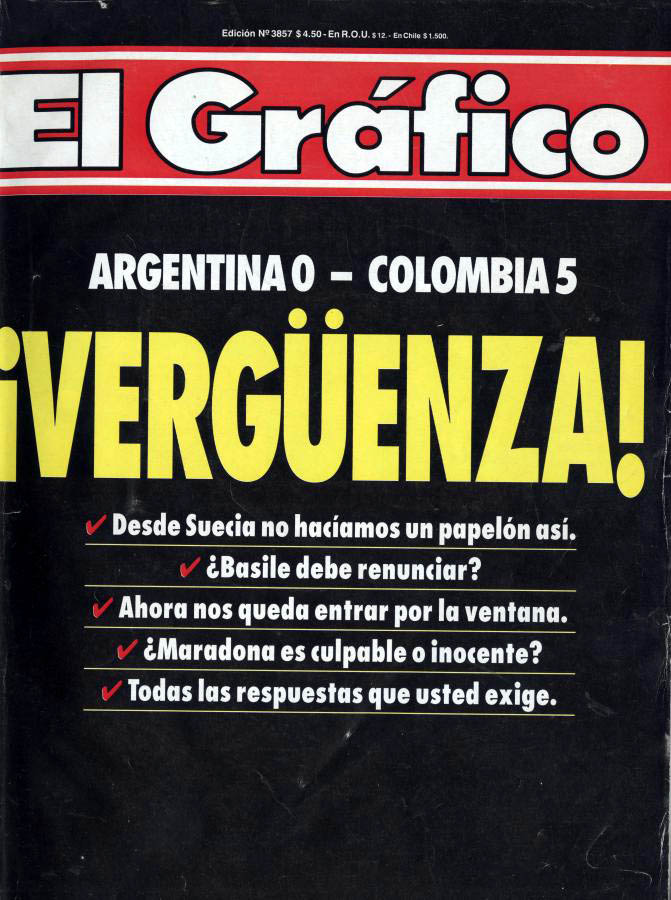
The cover of the 7 September 1993 issue of El Gráfico.

In Argentina, the defeat was lamented as a national humiliation. Two days after the match, the Argentine sports magazine El Gráfico published an issue with a plain black cover along with the words Vergüenza (meaning 'Shame') written in bold. Head coach Alfio Basile accepted full responsibility for the loss, remarking that he "never wanted to think about the match again." However, the Argentine Football Association still allowed Baslie to keep his managerial position through the inter-continental play-off against Australia.

In the final tournament itself in 1994, the two nations experienced contrasting fates. Argentina was eliminated in the round of 16 by Romania, with Diego Maradona being expelled mid-tournament after failing a drug test. As for Colombia, although marked by former Brazilian footballer Pelé as a favorite, they would finish last in their group after losing two matches to the United States and Romania. Their loss against the United States became particularly infamous due to Andrés Escobar's own goal and subsequent murder five days after returning to his hometown of Medellín.

The five-goal margin of defeat for this match is Argentina's largest losing deficit in any match, and is Argentina's third of only five matches in which the national team has lost by a margin of five goals; their first five-goal loss occurred at the 1958 FIFA World Cup in Sweden, where they lost 6−1 to Czechoslovakia; their second five-goal loss was a 5−0 loss to Uruguay a year later in 1959; their fourth five-goal loss was a 6−1 loss to Bolivia in a qualification match for the 2010 FIFA World Cup in La Paz, Bolivia; their fifth and most recent five-goal loss was a 6−1 loss to Spain in a friendly match in Madrid, Spain, that acted as a warm-up preparation match for the 2018 FIFA World Cup.
