= Colombia at the 1994 FIFA World Cup =

Colombia during the FIFA world cup in 1994

== (Colombia) 1994 Colombian Squad ==
Head coach: Francisco Maturana

No.	Pos.	Player	Date of birth (age)	Caps	Club
1	GK	Óscar Córdoba	3 February 1970 (aged 24)		(Colombia) América Cali
2	DF	Andrés Escobar	13 March 1967 (aged 27)		(Colombia) Atlético Nacional
3	DF	Alexis Mendoza	8 November 1961 (aged 32)		(Colombia) Atlético Junior
4	DF	Luis Fernando Herrera	12 June 1962 (aged 32)		(Colombia) Atlético Nacional
5	MF	Hermán Gaviria	27 November 1969 (aged 24)		(Colombia) Atlético Nacional
6	MF	Gabriel Gómez	8 December 1959 (aged 34)		(Colombia) Atlético Nacional
7	FW	Antony de Ávila	21 December 1962 (aged 31)		(Colombia) América Cali
8	MF	Harold Lozano	30 March 1972 (aged 22)		(Colombia) América Cali
9	FW	Iván Valenciano	18 March 1972 (aged 22)		(Colombia) Atlético Junior
10	MF	Carlos Valderrama	2 September 1961 (aged 32)		(Colombia) Atlético Junior
11	FW	Adolfo Valencia	6 February 1968 (aged 26)		(Germany) Bayern Munich
12	GK	Farid Mondragón	21 June 1971 (aged 22)		(Argentina) Argentinos Juniors
13	DF	Néstor Ortiz	20 September 1968 (aged 25)		(Colombia) Once Caldas
14	MF	Leonel Álvarez	29 July 1965 (aged 28)		(Colombia) América Cali
15	DF	Luis Carlos Perea	29 December 1963 (aged 30)		(Colombia) Atlético Junior
16	FW	Víctor Aristizábal	9 December 1971 (aged 22)		(Colombia) Atlético Nacional
17	MF	Mauricio Serna	22 January 1968 (aged 26)		(Colombia) Atlético Nacional
18	DF	Óscar Cortés	19 October 1968 (aged 25)		(Colombia) Millonarios
19	MF	Freddy Rincón	14 August 1966 (aged 27)		(Brazil) Palmeiras
20	DF	Wilson Pérez	6 August 1967 (aged 26)		(Colombia) América Cali
21	FW	Faustino Asprilla	10 November 1969 (aged 24)		(Italy) Parma
22	GK	José María Pazo	4 April 1964 (aged 30)		(Colombia) Atlético Junior

Source FIFA

== 1994 FIFA World Cup Qualification ==
Qualification - CONMEBOL Group A

August 1, 1993, Barranquilla, Colombia - Colombia 0 - 0 Paraguay

August 1, 1993, Lima, Peru - Peru 0 - 1 Argentina

August 8, 1993, Asunción, Paraguay - Paraguay 1 - 3 Argentina

August 8, 1993, Lima, Peru - Peru 0 - 1 Colombia

August 15, 1993, Asunción, Paraguay - Paraguay 2 - 1 Peru

August 18, 1993, Barranquilla, Colombia - Colombia 2 - 1 Argentina

August 22, 1993, Buenos Aires, Argentina - Argentina 2 - 1 Peru

August 22, 1993, Asunción, Paraguay - Paraguay 1 - 1 Colombia

August 29, 1993, Buenos Aires, Argentina - Argentina 0 - 0 Paraguay

August 29, 1993, Barranquilla, Colombia - Colombia 4 - 0 Peru

September 5, 1993, Lima, Peru - Peru 2 - 2 Paraguay

September 5, 1993, Buenos Aires, Argentina - Argentina 0 - 5 Colombia

Pos	Team	Pld	W	D	L	GF	GA	GD	Pts
1	Colombia	6	4	2	0	13	2	+11	10
2	Argentina	6	3	1	2	7	9	−2	7
3	Paraguay	6	1	4	1	6	7	−1	6
4	Peru	6	0	1	5	4	12	−8	1

Colombia qualified. Argentina advanced to the CONMEBOL / CONCACAF / OFC Intercontinental Play-off.

== 1994 FIFA World Cup ==
The 1994 FIFA World Cup, the 15th staging of the World Cup, was held in the United States from June 17 to July 17. Colombia was placed in Group A with Romania, USA, and Switzerland. Before the World Cup began however the Colombians found themselves in a problematic situation. Colombia's preparations were conducted against a backdrop of rumors that betting syndicates and drug cartels were exercising their influence over the squad. Coach Francisco Maturana was reported to have received death threats over matters of team selection. Gabriel Jaime Gomez Jaramillo (known as Barabas) was dropped from the squad presumably because of threats, with Hernán Gaviria taking his place.

Whatever the truth, Colombia's players were affected. They looked edgy and unfocused as they suffered a shock 3–1 loss in their opening game against Romania.

=== Colombia: 1-3 :Romania ===
June 18, 1994
16:35 PDT

Colombia	1–3	Romania
Valencia 43'	(Report)	Răducioiu 15', 89'; Hagi 34'

Rose Bowl, Pasadena
Attendance: 91,586
Referee: Jamal Al Sharif (Syria)

The match between Colombia and Romania was the first game for either side in the group phase. Colombia began the match well and were allowed a great deal of possession by the Romanians who seemed content to defend in depth. Some of the Colombians football was breathtaking, demonstrating their superior ball play. However, against the run of play, Romania took the lead in the 16th minute with their first attack of the match when Florin Raducioiu took on three defenders before firing home a low shot past goalkeeper Oscar Cordoba. The Colombians kept on showing off their dazzling skills and were constantly threatening the equaliser, however on the half-hour mark, Gheorghe Hagi made it 2-0 when he noticed Cordoba out of position and dipped a cross over his head into the net. The Colombians had excellent opportunities however the Romanian keeper, Stelea kept the Romanian lead intact with a string of brilliant saves until Valencia pulled a goal back for the Colombians in the 43rd minute when he headed in a corner from Perez. In the second half, The Colombians put the Romanians under a great deal of pressure with Stelea called upon to prevent goal-bound attempts from Asprilla and Alvarez before Florin Raducioiu put the result beyond doubt with his second goal in the final few minutes. Romania won this encounter 3–1, and the Colombians knew victory against USA in their following match would be vital if they were to progress any further.

=== United States: 2-1 :Colombia ===
June 22, 1994
16:35 PDT

United States	2–1	Colombia
Escobar 35' (o.g.); Stewart 52'	(Report)	Valencia 90'

Rose Bowl, Pasadena
Attendance: 93,689
Referee: Fabio Baldas (Italy)

Nonetheless, the most crucial game in Group A for Colombia. The USA knew they weren't favorites but played with passion and determination while Colombia was focused on attacking their opponents in order to get an early goal. As the game started off, the Americans put up fierce resistance as Colombia launched several attacks. The Americans survived an early scare when Marcelo Balboa had to clear the ball out of the goal's mouth after goalkeeper Tony Meola had failed to save the shot from Anthony de Avila. Balboa and Alexi Lalas held the creative Colombians at bay in the center of the defense while Earnie Stewart and John Harkes led several counterattacks against Colombia. In the 35th minute, John Harkes crossed the ball towards Earnie Stewart, and it was deflected by Colombian defender Andres Escobar into the net to give the U.S. a shocking 1–0 lead. Andres Escobar was stretching out to cut the cross and clear the ball out of the penalty area. Celebrations went wild as the USA took the lead. Colombia continued its attacks while Andres Escobar was determined to repair his error. In the 56th minute, Tab Ramos fired a shot through Colombia's defense, and Earnie Stewart was there to tap it in past Oscar Cordoba for the 2–0 lead. Even though Adolfo Valencia scored a late goal for Colombia, the U.S. claimed their victory.

=== Switzerland: 0-2 :Colombia ===
June 26, 1994
13:05 PDT

Switzerland	0–2	Colombia
	(Report)	Gaviria 44'; Lozano 90'

Stanford Stadium, Palo Alto
Attendance: 83,401
Referee: Peter Mikkelsen (Denmark)

With two defeats in their opening matches, Colombia's only hope to reach the 2nd Round was to defeat Switzerland and hope Romania would lose against the US in order to end in third place due to goal differences. Due to the format of the 1994 World Cup, the four best third-place finishers would advance. A header by Gavaria and a shot by Lozano gave Colombia a 2–0 victory over Switzerland. However, news that Romania had won against the US meant Colombia was out and going home. Even if the US had beaten Romania, the two goal margin over Switzerland would have been insufficient for Colombia to advance as they would have finished fifth among third place teams behind Russia, who finished with a better goal difference.

Six days later, on July 2, Escobar was shot to death outside a bar in a Medellín suburb. According to Escobar's girlfriend, the killer shouted "¡Gooooooooooooool!" (mimicking South American sporting commentators for their calls after a goal is scored) for each of the 12 bullets fired. The murder was widely believed to be retribution ordered by any cartel for the own goal scored in the game against the United States.

The own goal contributed to Colombia's elimination from the 1994 FIFA World Cup. Escobar's murder was linked by some reports to gambling losses related to the tournament.

=== 1994 FIFA World Cup - Group A [Final Standings] ===
Group A - Final Standings

Team	Pld	W	D	L	GF	GA	GD	Pts
Romania	3	2	0	1	5	5	0	6
Switzerland	3	1	1	1	5	4	+1	4
United States	3	1	1	1	3	3	0	4
Colombia	3	1	0	2	4	5	−1	3

USA	1 - 1	Switzerland
Colombia	1 - 3	Romania
Switzerland	4 - 1	Romania
USA	2 - 1	Colombia
Switzerland	0 - 2	Colombia
USA	0 - 1	Romania

== See also ==
- Colombia at the FIFA World Cup
- The Two Escobars
