= 1994 FIFA World Cup Group A =

Football tournament group stage

Group A of the 1994 FIFA World Cup was one of six groups of four teams competing at the 1994 World Cup in the United States. The first matches were played June 18, 1994, and the final games took place simultaneously on June 26, 1994.

The group consisted of one CONCACAF team, the host United States; two UEFA teams, Switzerland and Romania; and one CONMEBOL team, Colombia. Romania won the group, Switzerland finished second and also the United States advanced to the knockout stage as one of the best third-placed teams. Colombia finished last with only three points.

== Standings ==
Pos	Team	Pld	W	D	L	GF	GA	GD	Pts	Qualification
1	Romania	3	2	0	1	5	5	0	6	Advance to knockout stage
2	Switzerland	3	1	1	1	5	4	+1	4	Advance to knockout stage
3	United States (H)	3	1	1	1	3	3	0	4	Advance to knockout stage
4	Colombia	3	1	0	2	4	5	−1	3	

Source: FIFA
(H) Hosts

== Matches ==
All times listed are local time.

=== United States vs Switzerland ===
June 18, 1994
11:30 a.m. EDT (UTC–4)

United States	1–1	Switzerland
Wynalda 45'		Bregy 39'

Pontiac Silverdome, Pontiac
Attendance: 73,425
Referee: Francisco Oscar Lamolina (Argentina)

United States	Switzerland

GK	1	Tony Meola (c)
SW	17	Marcelo Balboa
RB	4	Cle Kooiman
CB	22	Alexi Lalas
LB	20	Paul Caligiuri
RM	9	Tab Ramos
CM	16	Mike Sorber
CM	5	Thomas Dooley
LM	6	John Harkes	(yellow card) 89'
CF	8	Earnie Stewart		(substituted off) 81'
CF	11	Eric Wynalda		(substituted off) 58'
Substitutions:
FW	10	Roy Wegerle		(substituted on) 58'
FW	13	Cobi Jones		(substituted on) 81'
Manager:
(Federal Republic of Yugoslavia) Bora Milutinović

GK	1	Marco Pascolo
SW	5	Alain Geiger (c)
RB	2	Marc Hottiger
CB	4	Dominique Herr	(yellow card) 26'
LB	3	Yvan Quentin
CM	6	Georges Bregy
CM	10	Ciriaco Sforza		(substituted off) 77'
RW	8	Christophe Ohrel
AM	16	Thomas Bickel		(substituted off) 72'
LW	7	Alain Sutter
CF	11	Stéphane Chapuisat
Substitutions:
FW	14	Nestor Subiat	(yellow card) 82'	(substituted on) 72'
MF	21	Thomas Wyss		(substituted on) 77'
Manager:
(England) Roy Hodgson

Assistant referees:
Ernesto Taibi (Argentina)
Venancio Zarate (Paraguay)
Fourth official:
Ernesto Filippi (Uruguay)

=== Colombia vs Romania ===
June 18, 1994
4:30 p.m. PDT (UTC–7)

Colombia	1–3	Romania
Valencia 43'		Răducioiu 16', 89'; Hagi 34'

Rose Bowl, Pasadena
Attendance: 91,856
Referee: Jamal Al Sharif (Syria)

Colombia	Romania

GK	1	Óscar Córdoba
RB	4	Luis Herrera	(yellow card) 36'
CB	2	Andrés Escobar
CB	15	Luis Carlos Perea
LB	20	Wilson Pérez
CM	6	Gabriel Gómez
CM	14	Leonel Álvarez	(yellow card) 70'
AM	10	Carlos Valderrama (c)	(yellow card) 53'
AM	19	Freddy Rincón
CF	11	Adolfo Valencia
CF	21	Faustino Asprilla
Manager:
Francisco Maturana

GK	12	Bogdan Stelea
SW	4	Miodrag Belodedici
CB	3	Daniel Prodan
CB	14	Gheorghe Mihali
RM	2	Dan Petrescu
CM	6	Gheorghe Popescu
CM	5	Ioan Lupescu
CM	7	Dorinel Munteanu
LM	10	Gheorghe Hagi (c)
CF	9	Florin Răducioiu	(yellow card) 39'	(substituted off) 90'
SS	11	Ilie Dumitrescu		(substituted off) 68'
Substitutions:
DF	13	Tibor Selymes		(substituted on) 68'
DF	19	Corneliu Papură		(substituted on) 90'
Manager:
Anghel Iordănescu

Assistant referees:
Yousif Abdullah Al Ghattan (Bahrain)
Douglas Micael James (Trinidad and Tobago)
Fourth official:
Alberto Tejada Noriega (Peru)

=== Romania vs Switzerland ===
June 22, 1994
4:00 p.m. EDT (UTC–4)

Romania	1–4	Switzerland
Hagi 35'		Sutter 16'; Chapuisat 52'; Knup 65', 72'

Pontiac Silverdome, Pontiac
Attendance: 61,428
Referee: Neji Jouini (Tunisia)

Romania	Switzerland

GK	12	Bogdan Stelea
SW	4	Miodrag Belodedici	(yellow card) 47'
CB	3	Daniel Prodan
CB	14	Gheorghe Mihali	(yellow card) 32'
RM	2	Dan Petrescu
CM	5	Ioan Lupescu	(yellow card) 40'	(substituted off) 85'
CM	6	Gheorghe Popescu
LM	7	Dorinel Munteanu
AM	10	Gheorghe Hagi (c)
CF	9	Florin Răducioiu
SS	11	Ilie Dumitrescu		(substituted off) 70'
Substitutions:
MF	15	Basarab Panduru		(substituted on) 85'
FW	16	Ion Vlădoiu	(red card) 73'	(substituted on) 70'
Manager:
Anghel Iordănescu

GK	1	Marco Pascolo
RB	2	Marc Hottiger
CB	4	Dominique Herr
CB	5	Alain Geiger (c)
LB	3	Yvan Quentin
RM	8	Christophe Ohrel	(substituted off) 83'
CM	6	Georges Bregy
CM	10	Ciriaco Sforza
LM	7	Alain Sutter	(substituted off) 71'
CF	9	Adrian Knup
CF	11	Stéphane Chapuisat
Substitutions:
MF	16	Thomas Bickel	(substituted on) 71'
MF	20	Patrick Sylvestre	(substituted on) 83'
Manager:
(England) Roy Hodgson

Assistant referees:
Abdel-Magid Hassan (Egypt)
Davoud Fanaei (Iran)
Fourth official:
Joël Quiniou (France)

Note: Switzerland's fourth goal is also credited to Georges Bregy.

=== United States vs Colombia ===
The match between the United States and Colombia saw the United States go ahead with just over 10 minutes to play in the first half, when Colombia defender Andrés Escobar turned a United States cross into his own net. The United States extended their lead early in the second half through Earnie Stewart, while Colombia could only manage a last-minute consolation goal and ended up losing 2–1. The result was the first United States's win in a FIFA World Cup match since the historic United States vs. England in 1950 and meant Colombia's chances of qualifying were no longer in their own hands; they would need to beat Switzerland and hope the United States would beat Romania to stand any chance of qualifying as one of the four best third-placed teams. Escobar was blamed for the result by Colombians and was murdered shortly after returning to the country.

June 22, 1994
4:30 p.m. PDT (UTC–7)

United States	2–1	Colombia
Escobar 35' (o.g.); Stewart 52'		Valencia 90'

Rose Bowl, Pasadena
Attendance: 93,869
Referee: Fabio Baldas (Italy)

United States	Colombia

GK	1	Tony Meola (c)
RB	21	Fernando Clavijo
CB	17	Marcelo Balboa
CB	22	Alexi Lalas	(yellow card) 48'
LB	20	Paul Caligiuri
RM	9	Tab Ramos
CM	16	Mike Sorber
CM	5	Thomas Dooley
LM	6	John Harkes
CF	11	Eric Wynalda		(substituted off) 61'
CF	8	Earnie Stewart		(substituted off) 66'
Substitutions:
FW	10	Roy Wegerle		(substituted on) 61'
MF	13	Cobi Jones		(substituted on) 66'
Manager:
(Federal Republic of Yugoslavia) Bora Milutinović

GK	1	Óscar Córdoba
RB	4	Luis Herrera
CB	2	Andrés Escobar
CB	15	Luis Carlos Perea
LB	20	Wilson Pérez
RM	19	Freddy Rincón
CM	14	Leonel Álvarez
CM	5	Hernán Gaviria
LM	10	Carlos Valderrama (c)
CF	21	Faustino Asprilla		(substituted off) 45'
CF	7	Antony de Ávila	(yellow card) 24'	(substituted off) 45'
Substitutions:
FW	9	Iván Valenciano		(substituted on) 45'
FW	11	Adolfo Valencia		(substituted on) 45'
Manager:
Francisco Maturana

Assistant referees:
Domenico Ramicone (Italy)
El Jilali Rharib (Morocco)
Fourth official:
Lim Kee Chong (Mauritius)

=== Switzerland vs Colombia ===
To have any hope of finishing in third place and a potential spot in the round of 16, Colombia needed a victory against already-qualified Switzerland and also needed Romania to lose to the United States in the match played simultaneously. Colombia took the lead in the 44th minute through Hernán Gaviria with a header to the left of the net that Switzerland goalkeeper Marco Pascolo got a hand to but failed to keep out. Gaviria was substituted late in the second half, and his replacement, Harold Lozano, doubled Colombia's lead in the last minute of the game with a low shot to the left of the net from the right edge of the six yard box. Colombia had managed the win they needed, but were eliminated anyways because the United States lost 1-0 to Romania.

June 26, 1994
1:00 p.m. PDT (UTC–7)

Switzerland	0–2	Colombia
		Gaviria 44'; Lozano 90'

Stanford Stadium, Stanford
Attendance: 83,401
Referee: Peter Mikkelsen (Denmark)

Switzerland	Colombia

GK	1	Marco Pascolo
RB	2	Marc Hottiger
CB	4	Dominique Herr
CB	5	Alain Geiger (c)
LB	3	Yvan Quentin
RM	8	Christophe Ohrel
CM	6	Georges Bregy	(yellow card) 85'
CM	10	Ciriaco Sforza
LM	7	Alain Sutter		(substituted off) 82'
CF	9	Adrian Knup	(yellow card) 39'	(substituted off) 82'
CF	11	Stéphane Chapuisat
Substitutions:
FW	14	Nestor Subiat		(substituted on) 82'
FW	15	Marco Grassi		(substituted on) 82'
Manager:
(England) Roy Hodgson

GK	1	Óscar Córdoba
RB	4	Luis Herrera
CB	2	Andrés Escobar
CB	3	Alexis Mendoza
LB	20	Wilson Pérez
RM	14	Leonel Álvarez	(yellow card) 80'
CM	5	Hernán Gaviria	(yellow card) 58'	(substituted off) 79'
CM	10	Carlos Valderrama (c)	(yellow card) 62'
LM	19	Freddy Rincón
CF	11	Adolfo Valencia		(substituted off) 64'
CF	21	Faustino Asprilla
Substitutions:
FW	7	Antony de Ávila		(substituted on) 64'
MF	8	Harold Lozano		(substituted on) 79'
Manager:
Francisco Maturana

Assistant referees:
Carl-Johan Meyer Christensen (Denmark)
Douglas Micael James (Trinidad and Tobago)
Fourth official:
Arturo Brizio Carter (Mexico)

=== United States vs Romania ===
Starting the day in third place, Romania needed a win to guarantee progress to the knockout phase. The United States' qualification was already practically assured, but a win for the host nation would open the door for Colombia to qualify ahead of Romania with victory over Switzerland. That prospect was ended in the 18th minute, when Dan Petrescu scored the only goal of the game for Romania, giving them a 1–0 win. Combined with Switzerland's loss to Colombia, that meant Romania finished top of the group, followed by Switzerland, with the United States in third. The United States ultimately qualified as one of the four best third-placed teams.

June 26, 1994
1:00 p.m. PDT (UTC–7)

United States	0–1	Romania
		Petrescu 18'

Rose Bowl, Pasadena
Attendance: 93,869
Referee: Mario van der Ende (Netherlands)

United States	Romania

GK	1	Tony Meola (c)
RB	21	Fernando Clavijo	(yellow card) 48'
CB	22	Alexi Lalas
CB	17	Marcelo Balboa
LB	20	Paul Caligiuri
CM	5	Thomas Dooley
CM	6	John Harkes	(yellow card) 41'
RM	16	Mike Sorber		(substituted off) 75'
LM	9	Tab Ramos		(substituted off) 64'
CF	8	Earnie Stewart
CF	11	Eric Wynalda
Substitutions:
FW	10	Roy Wegerle		(substituted on) 75'
MF	13	Cobi Jones		(substituted on) 64'
Manager:
(Federal Republic of Yugoslavia) Bora Milutinović

GK	1	Florin Prunea
SW	4	Miodrag Belodedici		(substituted off) 89'
CB	3	Daniel Prodan
CB	13	Tibor Selymes
RM	2	Dan Petrescu	(yellow card) 73'
CM	5	Ioan Lupescu
CM	6	Gheorghe Popescu
LM	7	Dorinel Munteanu
AM	10	Gheorghe Hagi (c)
CF	9	Florin Răducioiu	(yellow card) 62'	(substituted off) 84'
SS	11	Ilie Dumitrescu
Substitutions:
DF	14	Gheorghe Mihali		(substituted on) 89'
MF	18	Constantin Gâlcă		(substituted on) 84'
Manager:
Anghel Iordănescu

Assistant referees:
Jan Dolstra (Netherlands)
Gordon Dunster (Australia)
Fourth official:
Jamal Al Sharif (Syria)

== See also ==
- Colombia at the FIFA World Cup
- Romania at the FIFA World Cup
- Switzerland at the FIFA World Cup
- United States at the FIFA World Cup
