= 1994 FIFA World Cup qualification (CONMEBOL) =

Tournament details
- Dates: 18 July 1993 – 19 September 1993
- Teams: 9 (from 1 confederation)

Tournament statistics
- Matches played: 32
- Goals scored: 93 (2.91 per match)
- Attendance: 1,449,220 (45,288 per match)
- Top scorer(s): (Bolivia) Luis Ramallo (7 goals)

Listed below are the dates and results for the 1994 FIFA World Cup qualification rounds for the South American zone (CONMEBOL). For an overview of the qualification rounds, see the article 1994 FIFA World Cup qualification.

A total of 9 CONMEBOL teams entered the competition. Chile was banned by FIFA due to the 1989 Maracanazo incident. The South American zone was allocated 3 direct places and 1 play-off places in the final tournament.

== Format ==
The 9 teams were divided into 2 groups. The teams would play against each other on a home-and-away basis. The number of teams and spots for each group were as follows:

- Group A had 4 teams. The group winner would qualify. The runner-up would advance to the CONMEBOL / CONCACAF / OFC Intercontinental Play-off.
- Group B had 5 teams. The group winner and runner-up would qualify.

== Qualification seeding (CONMEBOL) ==
Pot 1	Pot 2	Pot 3	Pot 4	Pot 5
Argentina; Brazil	Colombia; Uruguay	Ecuador; Paraguay	Bolivia; Peru	Venezuela

== Group A ==
Pos	Team	Pld	W	D	L	GF	GA	GD	Pts	Qualification	Colombia national football team	Argentina national football team	Paraguay national football team	Peru national football team
1	Colombia	6	4	2	0	13	2	+11	10	Qualification to 1994 FIFA World Cup	—	2–1	0–0	4–0
2	Argentina	6	3	1	2	7	9	−2	7	Advance to inter-confederation play-offs	0–5	—	0–0	2–1
3	Paraguay	6	1	4	1	6	7	−1	6		1–1	1–3	—	2–1
4	Peru	6	0	1	5	4	12	−8	1		0–1	0–1	2–2	—

Rules for classification: Qualification stage tiebreakers

Colombia qualified. Argentina advanced to the CONMEBOL / CONCACAF / OFC Intercontinental Play-off.

1 August 1993

Colombia	0–0	Paraguay
	Report

Estadio Metropolitano Roberto Meléndez, Barranquilla
Attendance: 70,000
Referee: Renato Marsiglia (Brazil)
1 August 1993

Peru	0–1	Argentina
	Report	Batistuta 29'

Estadio Nacional, Lima
Attendance: 27,000
Referee: Enrique Marín (Chile)

8 August 1993

Paraguay	1–3	Argentina
Struway 45'	Report	Medina Bello 15', 78'; Redondo 65'

Estadio Defensores del Chaco, Asunción
Attendance: 46,500
Referee: Ernesto Filippi (Uruguay)
8 August 1993

Peru	0–1	Colombia
	Report	Rincón 45'

Estadio Nacional, Lima
Attendance: 25,000
Referee: Alfredo Rodas (Ecuador)

15 August 1993

Paraguay	2–1	Peru
Mendoza 14'; Chilavert 28' (pen.)	Report	Del Solar 45' (pen.)

Estadio Defensores del Chaco, Asunción
Attendance: 30,500
Referee: Francisco d'Abreu (Venezuela)
15 August 1993

Colombia	2–1	Argentina
Valenciano 2'; Valencia 52'	Report	Medina Bello 87'

Estadio Metropolitano Roberto Meléndez, Barranquilla
Attendance: 70,000
Referee: José Aparecido Oliveira (Brazil)

22 August 1993

Argentina	2–1	Peru
Batistuta 32'; Medina Bello 37'	Report	Palacios 66'

Estadio Monumental Antonio Vespucio Liberti, Buenos Aires
Attendance: 70,000
Referee: Jorge Nieves (Uruguay)
22 August 1993

Paraguay	1–1	Colombia
Rivarola 54'	Report	Rincón 22'

Estadio Defensores del Chaco, Asunción
Attendance: 30,000
Referee: Márcio Rezende de Freitas (Brazil)

29 August 1993

Argentina	0–0	Paraguay
	Report

Estadio Monumental Antonio Vespucio Liberti, Buenos Aires
Attendance: 47,000
Referee: Jorge Orellana (Ecuador)
29 August 1993

Colombia	4–0	Peru
Valenciano 30'; Rincón 45'; Mendoza 66'; Pérez 76'	Report

Estadio Metropolitano Roberto Meléndez, Barranquilla
Attendance: 70,000
Referee: Pablo Peña (Bolivia)

5 September 1993

Peru	2–2	Paraguay
Muchotrigo 22'; Soto 77'	Report	Mendoza 61', 81'

Estadio Nacional, Lima
Attendance: 40,000
Referee: José Luis da Rosa (Uruguay)
5 September 1993

Argentina	0–5	Colombia
	Report	Rincón 41', 74'; Asprilla 50', 75'; Valencia 85'

Estadio Monumental, Buenos Aires
Attendance: 53,000
Referee: Ernesto Filippi (Uruguay)

== Group B ==
Pos	Team	Pld	W	D	L	GF	GA	GD	Pts	Qualification	Brazil national football team	Bolivia national football team	Uruguay national football team	Ecuador national football team	Venezuela national football team
1	Brazil	8	5	2	1	20	4	+16	12	Qualification to 1994 FIFA World Cup	—	6–0	2–0	2–0	4–0
2	Bolivia	8	5	1	2	22	11	+11	11	Qualification to 1994 FIFA World Cup	2–0	—	3–1	1–0	7–0
3	Uruguay	8	4	2	2	10	7	+3	10		1–1	2–1	—	0–0	4–0
4	Ecuador	8	1	3	4	7	7	0	5		0–0	1–1	0–1	—	5–0
5	Venezuela	8	1	0	7	4	34	−30	2		1–5	1–7	0–1	2–1	—

Rules for classification: Qualification stage tiebreakers

Brazil and Bolivia qualified.

18 July 1993

Ecuador	0–0	Brazil
	Report

Estadio Monumental Isidro Romero Carbo, Guayaquil
Attendance: 80,000
Referee: Juan Carlos Loustau (Argentina)
18 July 1993

Venezuela	1–7	Bolivia
Palencia 14'	Report	Sánchez 25', 64', 70'; Ramallo 37', 61', 68'; Cristaldo 39'

Polideportivo Cachamay, Puerto Ordaz
Attendance: 12,000
Referee: Berny Ulloa Morera (Costa Rica)

25 July 1993

Bolivia	2–0	Brazil
Etcheverry 88'; Peña 89'	Report

Estadio Hernando Siles, La Paz
Attendance: 42,611
Referee: Juan Francisco Escobar (Paraguay)
25 July 1993

Venezuela	0–1	Uruguay
	Report	Herrera 59'

Estadio Pueblo Nuevo, San Cristóbal
Attendance: 12,000
Referee: José Torres Cadena (Colombia)

1 August 1993

Venezuela	1–5	Brazil
García 84'	Report	Raí 34' (pen.); Bebeto 70', 79'; Branco 71'; Palhinha 88'

Estadio Pueblo Nuevo, San Cristóbal
Attendance: 15,000
Referee: Armando Pérez Hoyos (Colombia)
1 August 1993

Uruguay	0–0	Ecuador
	Report

Estadio Centenario, Montevideo
Attendance: 45,000
Referee: Alberto Tejada (Peru)

8 August 1993

Ecuador	5–0	Venezuela
Muñoz 23'; E. Hurtado 40', 50', 76'; Chalá 60'	Report

Estadio Olímpico Atahualpa, Quito
Attendance: 15,000
Referee: Francisco Lamolina (Argentina)
8 August 1993

Bolivia	3–1	Uruguay
Sánchez 71'; Etcheverry 81'; Melgar 86'	Report	Francescoli 90'

Estadio Hernando Siles, La Paz
Attendance: 44,576
Referee: Iván Guerrero (Chile)

15 August 1993

Bolivia	1–0	Ecuador
Ramallo 18'	Report

Estadio Hernando Siles, La Paz
Attendance: 47,500
Referee: Hernan Silva (Chile)
15 August 1993

Uruguay	1–1	Brazil
Fonseca 79'	Report	Raí 28'

Estadio Centenario, Montevideo
Attendance: 55,000
Referee: Juan Antonio Bava (Argentina)

22 August 1993

Bolivia	7–0	Venezuela
Ramallo 8'; Melgar 58', 90'; Sánchez 69'; Sandy 75'; Etcheverry 78', 82'	Report

Estadio Hernando Siles, La Paz
Attendance: 40,000
Referee: Sabino Farina (Paraguay)
22 August 1993

Brazil	2–0	Ecuador
Bebeto 34'; Dunga 54'	Report

Estádio do Morumbi, São Paulo
Attendance: 78,000
Referee: José Torres Cadena (Colombia)

29 August 1993

Uruguay	4–0	Venezuela
Kanapkis 7', 31'; Cedrés 41'; Sosa 64'	Report

Estadio Centenario, Montevideo
Attendance: 20,000
Referee: Juan Francisco Escobar (Paraguay)
29 August 1993

Brazil	6–0	Bolivia
Raí 12'; Müller 18'; Bebeto 22', 60'; Branco 36'; Ricardo Gomes 44'	Report

Estádio do Arruda, Recife
Attendance: 72,000
Referee: Oscar Velásquez (Paraguay)

5 September 1993

Brazil	4–0	Venezuela
Ricardo Gomes 2', 89'; Palhinha 29'; Evair 31'	Report

Mineirão, Belo Horizonte
Attendance: 64,000
Referee: Francisco Lamolina (Argentina)
5 September 1993

Ecuador	0–1	Uruguay
	Report	Sosa 10'

Estadio Monumental Isidro Romero Carbo, Guayaquil
Attendance: 55,000
Referee: Enrique Marín (Chile)

12 September 1993

Uruguay	2–1	Bolivia
Francescoli 3' (pen.); Fonseca 45+6'	Report	Ramallo 23'

Estadio Centenario, Montevideo
Attendance: 58,000
Referee: Armando Pérez Hoyos (Colombia)
12 September 1993

Venezuela	2–1	Ecuador
García 1'; Morales 51'	Report	B. Tenorio 5'

Polideportivo Cachamay, Puerto Ordaz
Attendance: 3,000
Referee: Fernando Chappell (Peru)

19 September 1993

Ecuador	1–1	Bolivia
Noriega 72'	Report	Ramallo 45'

Estadio Monumental Isidro Romero Carbo, Guayaquil
Attendance: 10,000
Referee: John Toro Rendón (Colombia)
19 September 1993

Brazil	2–0	Uruguay
Romário 72', 82'	Report

Estádio do Maracanã, Rio de Janeiro
Attendance: 101,533
Referee: Alberto Tejada (Peru)

== Inter-confederation play-offs ==
Team 1	Agg.	Team 2	1st leg	2nd leg
Australia	1–2	Argentina	1–1	0–1

== Qualified teams ==
The following four teams from CONMEBOL qualified for the final tournament.

Team	Qualified as	Qualified on	Previous appearances in FIFA World Cup^{1}
Colombia	Group A winners	5 September 1993	2 (1962, 1990)
Brazil	Group B winners	19 September 1993	14 (all) (1930, 1934, 1938, 1950, 1954, **1958**, **1962**, 1966, **1970**, 1974, 1978, 1982, 1986, 1990)
Bolivia	Group B runners-up	19 September 1993	2 (1930, 1950)
Argentina	OFC-CONMEBOL play-off winners	17 November 1993	10 (1930, 1934, 1958, 1962, 1966, 1974, **1978**, 1982, **1986**, 1990)

^{1} Bold indicates champions for that year. Italic indicates hosts for that year.

== Goalscorers ==
7 goals

- (Bolivia) Luis Ramallo

5 goals

- (Bolivia) Erwin Sánchez
- (Brazil) Bebeto
- (Colombia) Freddy Rincón

4 goals

- (Argentina) Ramón Medina Bello
- (Bolivia) Marco Etcheverry

3 goals

- (Bolivia) Milton Melgar
- (Brazil) Ricardo Gomes
- (Brazil) Raí
- (Ecuador) Eduardo Hurtado
- (Paraguay) Alfredo Mendoza

2 goals

- (Argentina) Gabriel Batistuta
- (Brazil) Branco
- (Brazil) Palhinha
- (Brazil) Romário
- (Colombia) Faustino Asprilla
- (Colombia) Adolfo Valencia
- (Colombia) Iván Valenciano
- (Uruguay) Daniel Fonseca
- (Uruguay) Enzo Francescoli
- (Uruguay) Fernando Kanapkis
- (Uruguay) Ruben Sosa
- (Venezuela) Juan Enrique García

1 goal

- (Argentina) Abel Balbo
- (Argentina) Fernando Redondo
- (Bolivia) Alvaro Peña
- (Bolivia) Luis Cristaldo
- (Bolivia) Marco Sandy
- (Brazil) Dunga
- (Brazil) Evair
- (Brazil) Müller
- (Colombia) Alexis Mendoza
- (Colombia) Wilson Pérez
- (Ecuador) Cléber Chalá
- (Ecuador) Carlos Muñoz
- (Ecuador) Raúl Noriega
- (Ecuador) Byron Tenorio
- (Paraguay) José Luis Chilavert
- (Paraguay) Catalino Rivarola
- (Paraguay) Estanislao Struway
- (Peru) Darío Muchotrigo
- (Peru) Roberto Palacios
- (Peru) José del Solar
- (Peru) Jorge Soto
- (Uruguay) Gabriel Cedrés
- (Uruguay) José Herrera
- (Venezuela) Luis Morales
- (Venezuela) Oswaldo Palencia
