= Harold Lozano =

Colombian footballer (born 1972)

Personal information
- Full name: John Harold Lozano Prado
- Date of birth: 29 March 1972 (age 54)
- Place of birth: Cali, Colombia
- Height: 1.92 m (6 ft 3 1/2 in)
- Position: Midfielder

Senior career*
Years	Team	Apps	(Gls)
1991–1994	América Cali	129	(5)
1995	Palmeiras	19	(2)
1995–1996	América	28	(7)
1996–2002	Valladolid	105	(3)
2002–2003	Mallorca	29	(2)
2003–2004	Pachuca	15	(0)
Total		325	(19)

International career
1993–2003	Colombia	48	(3)
- * Club domestic league appearances and goals

John Harold Lozano Prado (born 30 March 1972) is a Colombian retired footballer who played mainly as a defensive midfielder.

He spent most of his 13-year professional career in Spain, amassing La Liga totals of 134 matches and five goals, almost all with Real Valladolid (six seasons).

== Club career ==
Lozano was born in Cali. During his career he played for América de Cali, Sociedade Esportiva Palmeiras (Brazil), Club América (Mexico), Real Valladolid and RCD Mallorca (Spain), retiring in 2004 after a stint with C.F. Pachuca (Mexico). Whilst at Mallorca, he helped them win the 2003 edition of the Copa del Rey.

While at the service of Valladolid, during a 29 September 2001 away match against Real Madrid which finished 2–2, opposing players blamed Lozano for whistling during a free kick, causing them to believe that the referee had blown the whistle and with the visitors profiting from the situation to score. He denied responsibility, saying it could have been any of the 90,000 spectators attending the game.

== International career ==
Lozano won 48 caps for Colombia over a ten-year span, and was a participant at the 1994 and at 1998 FIFA World Cups. He also represented the nation in three editions of the Copa América: 1993, 1995 and 1999.

=== International ===
International goals for Colombia

Score and results list Colombia's goal tally first.

#	Date	Venue	Opponent	Score	Result	Competition
1.	3 May 1994	Miami Orange Bowl, Miami, United States	Peru	1–0	1–0	Friendly
2.	5 May 1994	Miami Orange Bowl, Miami, United States	El Salvador	2–0	3–0	Friendly
3.	26 June 1994	Stanford Stadium, Stanford, United States	Switzerland	2–0	2–0	1994 FIFA World Cup
