= Leonel Álvarez (footballer, born 1965) =

Colombian football defensive midfielder

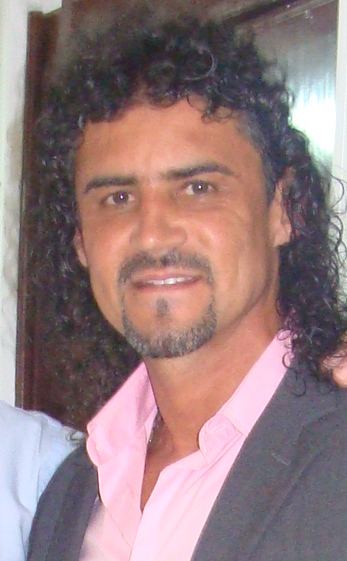
- Álvarez in 2010

Personal information
- Full name: Leonel de Jesús Álvarez Zuleta
- Date of birth: 29 July 1965 (age 61)
- Place of birth: Remedios, Colombia
- Height: 1.79 m (5 ft 10 in)
- Position: Defensive midfielder

Senior career*
Years	Team	Apps	(Gls)
1983–1986	Independiente Medellín	189	(3)
1987–1989	Atlético Nacional	42	(0)
1990	América de Cali	0	(0)
1990–1992	Real Valladolid	35	(0)
1992–1995	América de Cali	115	(5)
1996	Dallas Burn	22	(3)
1997	Veracruz	20	(2)
1998–1999	Dallas Burn	48	(0)
1999–2001	New England Revolution	58	(2)
2002	Deportivo Pereira	25	(1)
2003–2004	Deportes Quindío	16	(0)
Total		570	(16)

International career
1985–1997	Colombia	101	(1)

Managerial career
- 2007: Deportivo Pereira (assistant)
- 2008–2009: Independiente Medellín (assistant)
- 2009–2010: Independiente Medellín
- 2010–2011: Colombia (assistant)
- 2011: Colombia
- 2012: Once Caldas
- 2012: Itagüí
- 2013–2014: Deportivo Cali
- 2014: Veracruz
- 2015–2017: Independiente Medellín
- 2017–2018: Cerro Porteño
- 2018–2019: Club Libertad
- 2022: Águilas Doradas
- 2023: Cienciano
- 2024: Deportivo Pereira
- 2024: Emelec
- 2025–2026: Atlético Bucaramanga
- * Club domestic league appearances and goals

Leonel de Jesús Álvarez Zuleta (born 29 July 1965) is a Colombian football manager and former player who played as a defensive midfielder.

Álvarez played 101 times for the Colombia national team between 1985 and 1997, making him the third most capped player in Colombian international football. He also served as head coach of the Colombia national team in 2011, and is the only coach to have been champion twice with Independiente Medellín.

== Club career ==
Álvarez was born in Remedios, Colombia. He began his career with Independiente Medellín in 1983. In 1989, he was part of the Atlético Nacional team that won the Copa Libertadores in 1989. He won a Colombian league title with América de Cali in 1990 and another in 1992.

He has also played for Veracruz of Mexico and Real Valladolid of Spain.

Álvarez signed with Major League Soccer before the league's inaugural 1996 season, and was allocated to the Dallas Burn on 5 February 1996.

In his year with the team, Álvarez he scored three goals and five assists for the team from a defensive midfield position, and was named as part of the MLS Best XI. Álvarez moved to Mexico for the 1997 season, where he played for Veracruz. He returned to Dallas Burn in 1998, where he recovered his starting position; Álvarez would be an extremely important player in the Burn's central midfield for the next two years, but on 13 August 1999, he was traded to the New England Revolution for Ariel Graziani. He played his first match for the Revolution five days later, starting in a home loss to the Tampa Bay Mutiny. During the 2000 New England Revolution season, Álvarez scored his first goal for the Revolution, on 1 April against the LA Galaxy. He started all 3 matches of the Revolutions 2000 playoff campaign.

Álvarez played for the Revolution throughout 2001 before the team decided not to renew his contract for the 2002 season.

Late in his career, he returned to Colombian football, where he played for Deportes Quindío and for Deportivo Pereira.

== International career ==
Álvarez appeared in a total of 101 games for the Colombia, making his debut on 14 February 1985 against Poland. He appeared for Colombia in the 1990 and 1994 World Cups, playing in a total of seven games. Additionally, he played in the Copa América for his native country in 1987, 1989, 1991, 1993, and 1995.

== Coaching career ==
Álvarez began his coaching career as technical assistant at Deportivo Pereira, one of his former clubs. In 2008, he worked as the assistant coach at Independiente Medellín, the team he began his career with, working as Santiago Escobar's understudy. After Escobar was fired Álvarez was promoted and given his first head coach opportunity. In his debut season as a coach, he helped make Medellín champions. In May 2010 he was named the assistant coach of the Colombia national team. In September 2011, he was appointed head coach of the team, following the resignation of Hernán Bolillo Gómez. He got off to a good start by beating Bolivia, but was sacked on 14 December that year after the Colombian squad recorded a 1–1 draw with Venezuela and a 2–1 loss with Argentina in the World Cup qualifying campaign. In July 2012, he was appointed as Itagüí's new coach.

== Career statistics ==
Score and result list Colombia's goal tally first, score column indicates score after Álvarez goal.

International goal scored by Leonel Álvarez
No.	Date	Venue	Opponent	Score	Result	Competition
1	10 June 1987	Estadio Atanasio Girardot, Medellín, Colombia	Ecuador	1–0	1–0	Friendly

== Honors ==
=== Player ===
Atlético Nacional

- Copa Libertadores: 1989

América de Cali

- Categoría Primera A: 1990, 1992

Individual

- South American Team of The Year: 1990, 1993, 1995
- MLS All-Star: 1996, 1998
- MLS Best XI: 1996
- Dallas Burn MVP: 1996
- Flag of Wadeness - Inferno MVP Award: 1996

=== Manager ===
Independiente Medellín

- Categoría Primera A: 2009–II, 2016–I

Deportivo Cali

- Superliga Colombiana: 2014

== See also ==
- List of men's footballers with 100 or more international caps
