= Adolfo Valencia =

Colombian footballer (born 1968)

Personal information
- Full name: Adolfo José Valencia Mosquera
- Date of birth: 6 February 1968 (age 58)
- Place of birth: Buenaventura, Colombia
- Height: 1.82 m (5 ft 11 1/2 in)
- Position: Striker

Senior career*
Years	Team	Apps	(Gls)
1988–1993	Independiente Santa Fe	159	(56)
1993–1994	Bayern Munich	26	(11)
1994–1995	Atlético Madrid	24	(6)
1995–1996	Independiente Santa Fe	22	(11)
1996–1997	Reggiana	23	(4)
1997	América Cali	19	(9)
1998–1999	Independiente Medellín	44	(26)
1999–2000	PAOK	27	(8)
2000–2001	MetroStars	48	(21)
2002	Independiente Santa Fe	28	(11)
2002–2003	Zhejiang Lucheng	31	(14)
2003	Unión Maracaibo	7	(4)
2004	Zhejiang Lucheng	6	(0)
Total		442	(166)

International career
1992–1998	Colombia	37	(14)
- * Club domestic league appearances and goals

Adolfo José Valencia Mosquera (born 6 February 1968) is a Colombian retired footballer who played as a striker.

Nicknamed El tren (train) due to his powerful physique, he played in seven countries – having one-year spells in Germany and Spain's top flight – and represented Colombia at two World Cups.

== Club career ==
Born in Buenaventura, Valle del Cauca, Valencia started playing with Independiente Santa Fe, where his stellar performances earned him a transfer to Germany's FC Bayern Munich. In his sole season (although he still played the first game of 1994–95), he was instrumental in helping the Bavarians clinch the Bundesliga title, and finished as the team's top scorer alongside Mehmet Scholl, with 11 goals.

Valencia also played one season in Spain, with Atlético Madrid, where he was involved in a serious incident with irascible club president Jesús Gil, while vastly underperforming overall: after a La Liga match at CD Logroñés, the latter said that "The black guy needs to have his throat cut". He subsequently went on to represent, without settling at any club, Independiente Santa Fe, América de Cali, A.C. Reggiana 1919, Independiente Medellín, PAOK FC, NY/NJ MetroStars, Zhejiang Lucheng F.C. and Unión Atlético Maracaibo.

While at Zhejiang, Valencia led the Chinese second division in scoring during the 2003 season. In his debut campaign in the Major League Soccer, he set a team record by scoring 16 league goals, and retired from football in 2004.

== International career ==
Valencia made his debut for Colombia on 31 July 1992, scoring the only goal in a match against the United States at the Los Angeles Memorial Coliseum for the Friendship Cup, and proceeded to represent the nation at the 1994 and 1998 FIFA World Cups. In the former edition he netted twice, in group stage defeats to Romania and the United States.

Alongside Bernardo Redín, Valencia was Colombia's all-time topscorer in the World Cup. On 5 September 1993, he was one of three players on target in a 5–0 win in Argentina for the 1994 World Cup qualifiers.

=== International goals ===
Scores and results list Colombia's goal tally first.

Goal	Date	Venue	Opponent	Score	Final	Competition
1.	31 July 1992	Memorial Coliseum, Los Angeles, United States	United States	1–0	1–0	Amistad Cup
2.	31 March 1993	Atanasio Girardot, Medellín, Colombia	Costa Rica	1–0	4–1	Friendly
3.	31 March 1993	Atanasio Girardot, Medellín, Colombia	Costa Rica	4–1	4–1	Friendly
4.	8 May 1993	Orange Bowl, Miami, United States	United States	1–1	2–1	Friendly
5.	16 June 1993	9 de Mayo, Machala, Ecuador	Mexico	1–0	2–1	1993 Copa América
6.	3 July 1993	Reales Tamarindos, Portoviejo, Ecuador	Ecuador	1–0	1–0	1993 Copa América
7.	15 August 1993	Metropolitano Roberto Melendez, Barranquilla, Colombia	Argentina	2–0	2–1	1994 World Cup qualification
8.	5 September 1993	Monumental Antonio Vespucio Liberti, Buenos Aires, Argentina	Argentina	5–0	5–0	1994 World Cup qualification
9.	3 June 1994	Foxboro Stadium, Foxborough, United States	Northern Ireland	2–0	2–0	Friendly
10.	18 June 1994	Rose Bowl, Pasadena, United States	Romania	1–2	1–3	1994 FIFA World Cup
11.	22 June 1994	Rose Bowl, Pasadena, United States	United States	1–2	1–2	1994 FIFA World Cup
12.	21 March 1996	Guillermo Plazas Alcid, Neiva, Colombia	Trinidad and Tobago	2–0	3–0	Friendly
13.	28 March 1996	Atanasio Girardot, Medellín, Colombia	Bolivia	1–1	4–1	Friendly
14.	28 March 1996	Atanasio Girardot, Medellín, Colombia	Bolivia	4–1	4–1	Friendly

== Personal life ==
Valencia's son, José Adolfo, was also a footballer and a striker. He played mostly for Independiente Santa Fe, and represented Colombia at under-20 level.

== Honours ==
=== Club ===
Bayern Munich

- Bundesliga: 1993–94

América Cali

- Categoría Primera A: 1997

Maracaibo

- Venezuelan Primera División: 2003

=== Individual ===
- MLS All-Star: 2000
