= Ernesto Filippi =

Uruguayan football referee

Ernesto Filippi Cavani (born 26 October 1950 in Lucca, Italy) is a former Uruguayan football referee. He is known for supervising one match during the 1994 FIFA World Cup in the United States.
