= Wilson Pérez =

Colombian footballer (born 1967)

Personal information
- Full name: Wilson Enrique Pérez Pérez
- Date of birth: August 9, 1967 (age 59)
- Place of birth: Barranquilla, Colombia
- Height: 1.68 m (5 ft 6 in)
- Position: Defender

Senior career*
Years	Team	Apps	(Gls)
1985–1989	Atletico Junior	88	(16)
1990-1996, 1999	América de Cali	230	(2)
1997	Unicosta	44	(1)
1998	Independiente Medellin	30	(1)
1999	America	28	(2)
2000	Millonarios	25	(2)
2001–02	Atletico Junior		

International career
1989–1997	Colombia	47	(3)
- * Club domestic league appearances and goals as of September 2008

Wilson Enrique Pérez Pérez (born August 9, 1967) is a retired Colombian football defender who was capped 47 times and scored 3 international goals for the Colombia national team between 1989 and 1997, including three matches at the 1994 World Cup.

Pérez started his professional playing career in 1985 with Atletico Junior, then was transferred to America de Cali where he was part of the successful team that won several championships. In 1997, he joined Deportivo Unicosta.

From 1998 onwards he played single seasons with Independiente Medellín, América de Cali, Millonarios and finally Atlético Junior in 2001.

On the international stage, Pérez played in the 1994 FIFA World Cup, he also played in two editions of the Copa América in 1989 and 1993.

== Titles ==
Season	Team	Title
1990	(Colombia) América de Cali	Colombian league
1992	(Colombia) América de Cali	Colombian league
