= 1994 FIFA World Cup =

Soccer tournament in the United States

World Cup USA '94
- Making Soccer History

Tournament details
- Host country: United States
- Dates: June 17 – July 17
- Teams: 24 (from 5 confederations)
- Venues: 9 (in 9 host cities)

Final positions
- Champions: Brazil (4th title)
- Runners-up: Italy
- Third place: Sweden
- Fourth place: Bulgaria

Tournament statistics
- Matches played: 52
- Goals scored: 141 (2.71 per match)
- Attendance: 3,587,538 (68,991 per match)
- Top scorer(s): (Bulgaria) Hristo Stoichkov (Russia) Oleg Salenko (6 goals each)
- Best player: (Brazil) Romário
- Best young player: (Netherlands) Marc Overmars
- Best goalkeeper: (Belgium) Michel Preud'homme
- Fair play award: Brazil

The 1994 FIFA World Cup was the 15th FIFA World Cup, the world championship for men's national soccer teams. It was hosted by the United States and took place from June 17 to July 17, 1994, at nine venues across the country. The United States was chosen as the host by FIFA on July 4, 1988. Despite soccer's relative lack of popularity in the host nation, the tournament was the most financially successful in World Cup history. It broke tournament records with a total attendance of 3,587,538 and an average of 68,991 per game, figures that were unsurpassed until the 48-team 2026 World Cup which was hosted in the United States, Canada, and Mexico, despite the expansion of the competition from 24 to 32 teams from the 1998 World Cup.

Brazil won the competition, defeating Italy in the final at the Rose Bowl in Pasadena, California. The game ended 0–0 after extra time, and Brazil won 3–2 in a penalty shootout. It was the first World Cup final to be decided on penalties. The victory made Brazil the first nation to win four World Cup titles. There were three new entrants in the tournament: Greece, Nigeria, and Saudi Arabia; Russia also appeared as a separate nation for the first time, following the breakup of the Soviet Union, and for the first time since 1938, a unified Germany took part in the tournament. It was also the defending champion, but was eliminated in the quarterfinals by Bulgaria. It was the first World Cup in which three points were awarded for a win instead of two and also the first with the back-pass rule. This was done to encourage a more attacking style of play as a response to the criticism of the defensive tactics and low-scoring matches of the 1990 World Cup. This resulted in an average of 2.71 goals per match, compared to 2.21 in 1990.

== Background and preparations ==
=== Bidding process ===
Three nations bid to host the event: United States, Brazil, and Morocco. The vote was held in Zurich on July 4, 1988 (Independence Day in the United States), and only took one round with the United States bid receiving a little over half of the votes by the FIFA Executive Committee members. FIFA hoped that by staging the world's most prestigious tournament there, it would lead to a growth of interest in the sport.

An inspection committee also found that the proposed Brazilian stadiums were deficient, while the Moroccan bid relied on the construction of nine new stadiums. Conversely, all the proposed stadiums in the United States were already built and fully functioning; U.S. Soccer spent $500 million preparing and organizing the tournament, far less than the billions other countries previously had spent and subsequently would spend on preparing for this tournament. The U.S. bid was seen as the favorite and was prepared in response to losing the right to be the replacement host for the 1986 tournament following Colombia's withdrawal.

One condition FIFA imposed was the creation of a professional soccer league – Major League Soccer was founded in 1993 and began operating in 1996. There was some initial controversy about awarding the World Cup to a country where soccer was not a nationally popular sport, and at the time, in 1988, the U.S. no longer had a professional league; the North American Soccer League, established in 1967, had folded in 1984 after attendance faded. The success of the 1984 Summer Olympics in Los Angeles, particularly the soccer tournament that drew 1.4 million spectators throughout the event, also contributed to FIFA's decision.

The United States had previously bid to host the 1986 World Cup, after Colombia withdrew as the host nation in November 1982 because of economic concerns. Despite a presentation led by former North American Soccer League players Pelé and Franz Beckenbauer, as well as former United States Secretary of State Henry Kissinger, the executive committee selected Mexico. There were proposals by FIFA to introduce larger goals and breaks after every quarter instead of just at halftime in order to appease U.S. television advertisers. These proposals were met with resistance, and ultimately rejected.

== Venues ==
The games were played in nine cities across the contiguous United States. All stadiums had a capacity of at least 53,000 and were occupied by professional or college American football teams.

Other host city candidates included Atlanta, Denver, Kansas City, Las Vegas, Miami, Minneapolis, New Orleans, Philadelphia, Seattle, and Tampa, as well as smaller communities such as Annapolis, Maryland; Columbus, Ohio; Corvallis, Oregon; and New Haven, Connecticut. Some sites, including Joe Robbie Stadium in Miami and Candlestick Park in San Francisco, were rejected because of conflicts with Major League Baseball. Stanford Stadium in the San Francisco Bay Area's South Bay and the Citrus Bowl in Orlando, Florida, were picked instead (the Miami Orange Bowl, another Miami venue, required major renovations to meet tournament standards).

The Rose Bowl hosted the most matches with eight, four of them in the knockout stage, including the final. Giants Stadium hosted seven games including a semifinal; Foxborough Stadium, Stanford Stadium, and the Cotton Bowl hosted six games each, and Soldier Field, Robert F. Kennedy Memorial Stadium, and the Citrus Bowl hosted five games each. Pontiac Silverdome, the first indoor stadium used in a World Cup, hosted four group-stage games, the fewest of any venue; it was also the only one of the nine used that did not host knockout-round games.

Los Angeles (Pasadena, California)	San Francisco Bay Area (Stanford, California)	Detroit (Pontiac, Michigan)	New York/New Jersey (East Rutherford, New Jersey)
Rose Bowl	Stanford Stadium	Pontiac Silverdome	Giants Stadium
Capacity: 94,194	Capacity: 84,147	Capacity: 77,557	Capacity: 76,322
Dallas	1994 FIFA World Cup (the United States)		
Cotton Bowl	1994 FIFA World Cup (the United States)		
Capacity: 64,000	1994 FIFA World Cup (the United States)		
Chicago	Orlando	Foxborough, Massachusetts	Washington, D.C.
Soldier Field	Citrus Bowl	Foxboro Stadium	Robert F. Kennedy Memorial Stadium
Capacity: 63,160	Capacity: 62,387	Capacity: 54,456	Capacity: 53,121

== Participating teams ==
=== Qualification ===
Four teams—one African, one Asian, and two European—made their debuts at the 1994 tournament. Nigeria qualified from the African zone alongside Cameroon and Morocco as CAF was granted three spots as a result of the strong performances by African teams in 1986 and 1990. In the Asian zone, Saudi Arabia qualified for the first time by topping the final round group ahead of South Korea as both edged out Japan, which was close to making its own World Cup debut, but was denied by Iraq in what became known as the "Agony of Doha". In the European zone, Greece made its first World Cup appearance after topping a group from which Russia also qualified, competing for the first time following the dissolution of the Soviet Union.

The defending champion, West Germany, had reunited with East Germany, so a united Germany took part for the first time since the 1938 World Cup. Norway qualified for the first time since 1938, Bolivia for the first time since 1950 (and the last time as of 2026), and Switzerland for the first time since 1966. Norway's 56-year gap between appearances in the tournament equaled Egypt's record from the previous tournament as the longest. Mexico qualified for the first time since 1978. England was notably absent; after finishing in fourth place in 1990, it failed to qualify for the 1994 event, finishing third in its qualifying group. This was England's first failure to qualify for a World Cup since 1978. It was also the first time that none of the home nations (England, Northern Ireland, Scotland, and Wales) qualified since first entering in 1950. Following its failure to qualify for the 1990 tournament, France again missed the 1994 edition after conceding a goal in the final minute of its concluding qualifying match against Bulgaria. The resulting defeat left France third in the group, behind both Bulgaria and Sweden.

The qualification campaigns of Czechoslovakia and Yugoslavia were affected by political events. The nation of Czechoslovakia dissolved in 1993, completing its qualifying group under the name "Representation of Czechs and Slovaks" (RCS), but failed to qualify for the finals, having been edged out by Romania and Belgium in Group 4. Yugoslavia (which was supposed to play in Group 5) was suspended from international competition in 1992 as part of United Nations sanctions against the country as a result of the Yugoslav Wars. The sanctions were not lifted until 1994, by which time it was no longer possible for the team to qualify. Chile's suspension from the 1990 World Cup, following the forced interruption of its qualification game against Brazil, extended to the 1994 qualifiers as well.

==== List of qualified teams ====
The following 24 teams qualified for the tournamentː Their pre-tournament FIFA World Ranking from June 1994 is shown in parentheses.

AFC (2)

- Saudi Arabia (34) (Debut)
- South Korea (37)

CAF (3)

- Cameroon (24)
- Morocco (28)
- Nigeria (11) (Debut)

OFC (0)

- None qualified

CONCACAF (2)

- Mexico (16)
- United States (23) (host)

CONMEBOL (4)

- Argentina (8)
- Bolivia (43)
- Brazil (3)
- Colombia (17)

UEFA (13)

- Belgium (27)
- Bulgaria (29)
- Germany (defending champion) (1)
- Greece (31) (Debut)
- Italy (4)
- Netherlands (2)
- Norway (6)
- Republic of Ireland (14)
- Romania (7)
- Russia (19)
- Spain (5)
- Sweden (10)
- Switzerland (12)

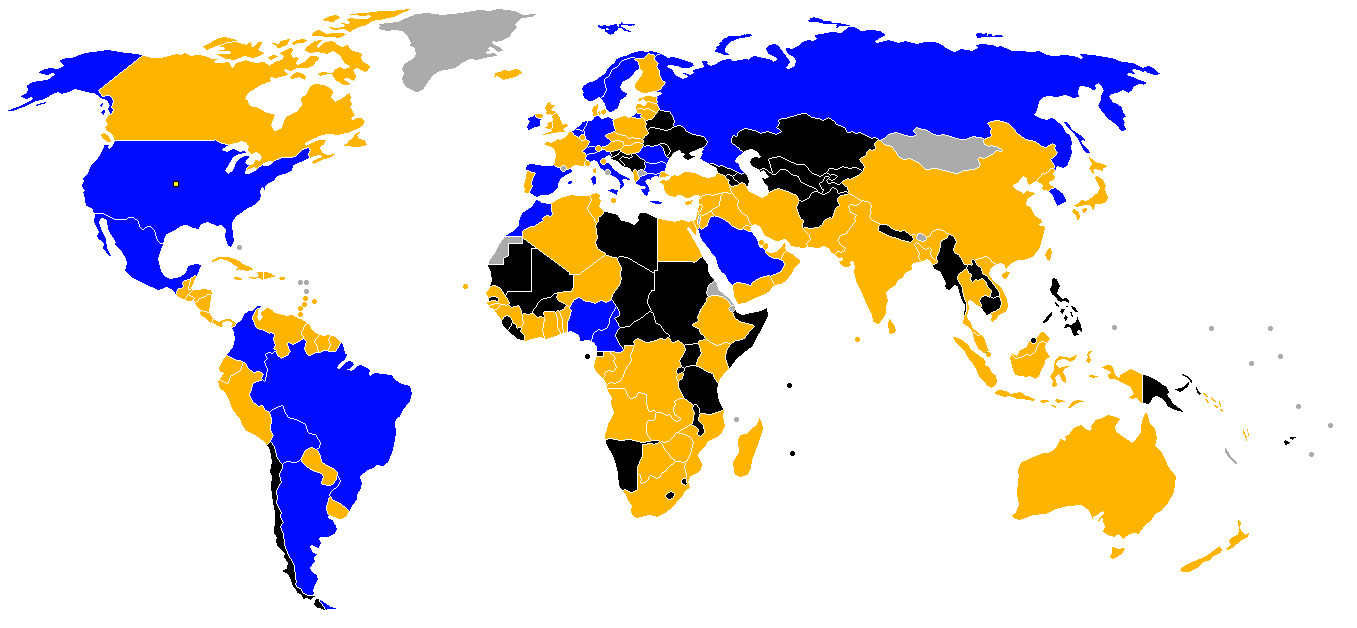
Countries qualified for World Cup Country failed to qualify Countries that did not enter or were banned from the World Cup Country not a FIFA member

== Squads ==
Teams were selected following usual FIFA rules with 22 players. Greece, Italy, Saudi Arabia, and Spain were the only countries that had all their players coming from domestic teams, while the Republic of Ireland and Nigeria had no players from domestic teams. Saudi Arabia was the only team with no players from European teams.

== Referees ==
CAF

- (Mauritius) Lim Kee Chong
- (Tunisia) Neji Jouini

AFC

- (Syria) Jamal Al Sharif
- (United Arab Emirates) Ali Bujsaim

UEFA

- (Italy) Fabio Baldas
- (Spain) Manuel Díaz Vega
- (England) Philip Don
- (Sweden) Bo Karlsson
- (Germany) Hellmut Krug
- (Denmark) Peter Mikkelsen
- (Scotland) Leslie Mottram
- (Italy) Pierluigi Pairetto
- (Hungary) Sándor Puhl
- (France) Joël Quiniou
- (Switzerland) Kurt Röthlisberger
- (Netherlands) Mario van der Ende

CONCACAF

- (United States) Arturo Angeles
- (Costa Rica) Rodrigo Badilla
- (Mexico) Arturo Brizio Carter

CONMEBOL

- (Colombia) José Torres Cadena
- (Uruguay) Ernesto Filippi
- (Argentina) Francisco Oscar Lamolina
- (Brazil) Renato Marsiglia
- (Peru) Alberto Tejada

== Draw ==
=== Seeding and drawing ===
The FIFA Organizing Committee upheld the tradition to seed the host (United States) and defending champion (Germany), along with the other four teams ranked in the top five based on their results obtained in the last three FIFA World Cups. The newly introduced FIFA World Ranking was not used as part of the calculated ranking for the seeding in this World Cup, as FIFA considered it to be too new. Despite that it was not used in any way, for comparison purposes the teams' pre-tournament FIFA World ranking position from June 1994 are shown in parentheses, followed by the official and used ranking (OR) position determined by the results obtained in the last three world cups.

The six top-seeded teams, were allocated in pot 1 and would be drawn into the first position of the six groups playing in the group stage. The remaining 18 teams were allocated into three pots based on geographical sections, with the: six qualified teams from Africa and Americas in pot 2, the top-6 ranked European teams in pot 3, while pot 4 comprised the 7th–10th best qualified European teams along with the two qualified Asian teams.

The principle of the draw was that each of the six drawn groups would have one team drawn respectively from pot 1, 2, 3 and 4; while respecting the following geographical limitations:

1. At least two European teams from UEFA in all groups, with one group having three European teams.
2. United States and Mexico could not be drawn in the same group, because only one CONCACAF team per group.
3. Brazil and Argentina could not be drawn with another South American team, because only one CONMEBOL team per group.
4. As all qualified Asian teams from AFC were in pot 4, and all qualified African teams from CAF in pot 2, this automatically ensured only allowing maximum one Asian team and maximum one African team per group, as part of the normal draw procedure – without needing to observe special restricting sub-rules for them.

Pot 1 Top-seeded teams (top 5 teams + hosts)	Pot 2 Africa & Americas (CAF, CONCACAF and CONMEBOL)	Pot 3 Best unseeded from Europe (UEFA)	Pot 4 Asia and worst ranked from Europe (AFC and UEFA)
United States (hosts) (23, OR=18); Germany (1990 champions) (1, OR=1); Argentina (8, OR=2); Italy (4, OR=3); Brazil (3, OR=4); Belgium (27, OR=5)	Mexico (16, OR=8); Cameroon (24, OR=9); Morocco (28, OR=11); Colombia (17, OR=13); Nigeria (11, OR=new); Bolivia (43, OR=new)	Spain (5, OR=6); Russia (19, OR=7); Ireland (14, OR=10); Romania (7, OR=12); Netherlands (2, OR=14); Bulgaria (29, OR=15)	South Korea (37, OR=16); Sweden (10, OR=17); Greece (31, OR=new); Norway (6, OR=new); Switzerland (12, OR=new); Saudi Arabia (34, OR=new)

The draw took place at the Las Vegas Convention Center and was televised live on December 19, 1993, on ESPN in the United States and Eurosport in all Europe with English language commentary on the latter channel by Scottish sportscaster Archie Macpherson. The draw presenters were Dick Clark and Faye Dunaway. The balls were drawn by former footballers Eusébio, Bobby Charlton, Michel Platini, Marco van Basten, Roger Milla, and USMNT goalkeeper Tony Meola, alongside Evander Holyfield, Franz Beckenbauer, Beau Bridges, Michelle Akers, Mario Andretti, Carol Alt, Peter Max, Mary Lou Retton, and Robin Williams.

Ahead of the draw, the FIFA Organizing Committee had decided to allocate the top-seeded first group position A1 for the United States as the host, C1 for defending champion Germany, and E1 for the Italian team, which had requested to play most of its group matches at Giants Stadium in New York–New Jersey. The three other top-seeded teams would be located at the first position of either group B/D/F, with the decision largely depending on the identity of the other drawn group members for the seeded teams. Therefore, this last decision would only be made by a secret vote made by the FIFA Organizing Committee a few minutes after all teams had been drawn for all groups, and the decision would only be announced as the last step of the televised draw event. To make this procedure possible, the six drawn groups would during the draw be given the colors green, orange, white, black, pink and blue; and the closing remarks at the event would then reveal the group letters represented by the colors. The six groups from A to F would play their group matches in the following nine cities:

- Group A and B played in Detroit, the San Francisco Bay Area, and Los Angeles.
- Group C and D played in Chicago, Dallas, and Boston.
- Group E and F played in New York–New Jersey, Washington DC, and Orlando.

Procedure for the draw:

1. Pot 1 was used to draw the six top-seeded teams into the first position of the six groups designated by the colors green, orange, white, black, pink and blue. Group letters behind each color would only be decided by a following secret FIFA Organizing Committee vote and only be revealed after the draw had been completed, although the committee had already predetermined ahead of the draw that (1) the United States should play in group A, (2) Germany should play in group C, and (3) Italy should play in group E.
2. Pot 2 was used to draw one team to each of the six colored groups, with the draw conducted in the color order from left to right (green, orange, white, black, pink, blue); while this order however at the same time had to respect the following restricted geographical rules:
  - Rule 1: First two drawn non South American teams shall irrespectively of the color order, first be drawn into the two groups led by a South American team, in order to avoid the possibility for these groups later to be drawn by a second South American team.
  - Rule 2: First drawn South American team or the second or the last drawn African team shall irrespectively of the color order, first be drawn into the group led by the CONCACAF team, the United States, in order to avoid the possibility for this group later to be drawn by the second CONCACAF team Mexico.
  - Rule 3: One of the two South American teams shall irrespectively of the color order, first be drawn into the first available open group being led by a European team, in order to avoid the meeting of two South American teams in the same group.
  - Rule 4: Mexico can not be drawn together with the United States as they are both CONCACAF teams, so Mexico will be grouped with the first still open available group being led by a European or South American team, as per the color order.
3. Pot 3 was used to draw one European team to each of the six colored groups, with the draw conducted in the color order from left to right (green, orange, white, black, pink, blue).
4. Pot 4 was used to draw one European/Asian team to each of six colored groups, with the draw conducted in the color order from left to right (green, orange, white, black, pink, blue). However, in order to respect the geographical rule that five of the groups shall have two European teams – and the rule that three European teams is only allowed in one group, the color order will be skipped subject to these allocation rules:
  - Rule 1: All drawn Asian (AFC) teams would not be drawn into any of the three groups led by a top-seeded CONCACAF/CONMEBOL team (United States/Brazil/Argentina), but would instead only be allowed to join a group being led by a top-seeded European team.
  - Rule 2: All drawn European (UEFA) teams, shall first be drawn into the three groups led by a top-seeded CONCACAF/CONMEBOL team (United States/Brazil/Argentina), until the point of time when only European team(s) remain to be drawn from the last pot 4.
5. The exact group position number for the teams (2, 3 or 4) in each colored group, were also drawn immediately from six special group bowls, after each respective team had been drawn from pot 2, 3 and 4.
6. Group letters behind each color (green, orange, white, black, pink and blue) would finally be decided by a final secret FIFA Organizing Committee vote, being announced as the last part of the televised event.

The draw was officiated by FIFA general-secretary Joseph Blatter. Teams were drawn by former and at the time football players such as Eusébio, Tony Meola, Bobby Charlton, Roger Milla, Michel Platini, and Marco van Basten; actor Beau Bridges; Women's World Cup champion Michelle Akers; model Carol Alt; artist Peter Max; racecar driver Mario Andretti; and Olympic gold medalist in gymnastics Mary Lou Retton. Numbers for placement in the group were drawn by German legend Franz Beckenbauer, heavyweight boxing champion Evander Holyfield, and comedian and actor Robin Williams.

=== Results of the draw ===
Group A (blue)	Group B (orange)	Group C (green)	Group D (white)	Group E (pink)	Group F (black)
1. United States (23, OR=18); 2. Switzerland (12, OR=new); 3. Colombia (17, OR=13); 4. Romania (7, OR=12)	1. Brazil (3, OR=4); 2. Russia (19, OR=7); 3. Cameroon (24, OR=9); 4. Sweden (10, OR=17)	1. Germany (1, OR=1); 2. Bolivia (43, OR=new); 3. Spain (5, OR=6); 4. South Korea (37, OR=16)	1. Argentina (8, OR=2); 2. Greece (31, OR=new); 3. Nigeria (11, OR=new); 4. Bulgaria (29, OR=15)	1. Italy (4, OR=3); 2. Ireland (14, OR=10); 3. Norway (6, OR=new); 4. Mexico (16, OR=8)	1. Belgium (27, OR=5); 2. Morocco (28, OR=11); 3. Netherlands (2, OR=14); 4. Saudi Arabia (34, OR=new)

In each group, the teams played three games, one against each of the other teams. After completion of the group stage, the best two teams in each group, as well as the four best-ranked third-place teams, advanced to the round of 16 in the knockout stage. This format was identical to the tournament structure used in 1986 and 1990 except that a win now earned three points instead of two, to encourage more attacking play.

== Summary ==
The format of the competition stayed the same as in the 1990 World Cup: 24 teams qualified, divided into six groups of four. Sixteen teams would qualify for the knockout phase: the six group winners, the six group runners-up, and the four third-placed teams with the best records. This was the last time this format was used, due to the expansion of the finals tournament in 1998 to 32 teams. FIFA introduced three rule changes for this tournament to encourage attacking play: three points awarded for a win in a group stage match instead of two, a relaxed offside rule and a ban on picking up back-passes to goalkeepers. The number of goals increased to 2.73 per game from the record-low of 2.21 in 1990.

FIFA heavily pressured local organizers to schedule all of the games to be played during the day, enabling European television broadcasters to air World Cup matches during late afternoon and evening hours (for example, matches that started at 12:30 PM EDT in New York would air at 6:30 PM in Paris, France) but affecting playing conditions. Cities with the most consistently difficult conditions were Orlando and Dallas in the South, because of the combination of heat and extreme humidity, while Detroit proved to be difficult due to the Pontiac Silverdome being an air-supported stadium.

The tournament saw the end of Diego Maradona's World Cup career, having played in the 1982, 1986, and 1990 World Cups, and leading Argentina to the 1986 World Cup title and the final of the 1990 World Cup. Maradona was expelled from the tournament by FIFA after he failed a drug test that uncovered ephedrine, a weight-loss drug and a stimulant, in his blood. Colombia, despite high expectations due to their style and impressive qualifying campaign, failed to advance from the round robin. The team was dogged by influence from betting syndicates and drug cartels, with coach Francisco Maturana receiving death threats over squad selection. After scoring an own goal for the United States and effectively eliminating Colombia from the competition, defender Andrés Escobar was shot to death on his return to Colombia outside a bar in a Medellín suburb 10 days later, possibly in retaliation for his mistake.

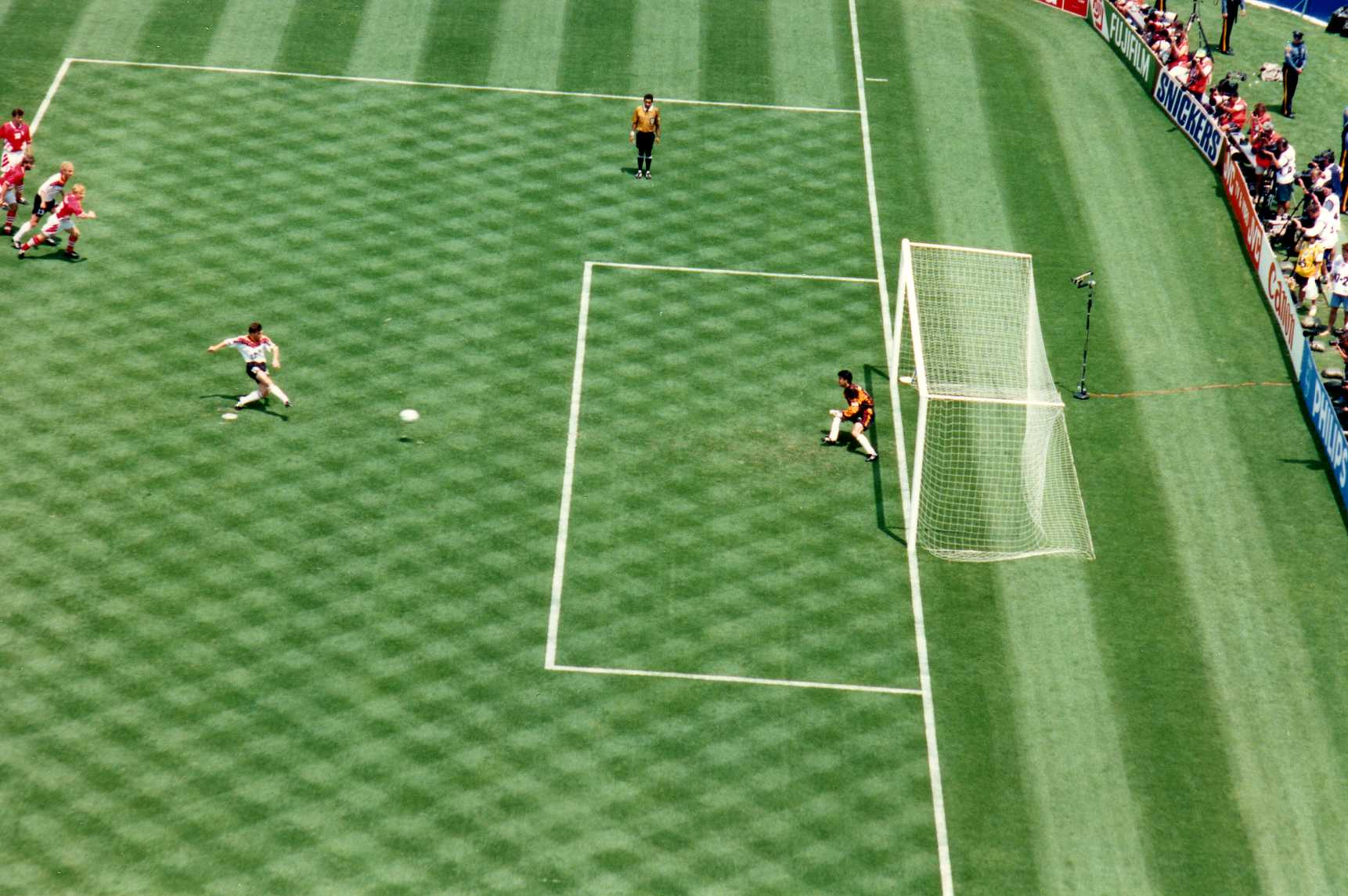
Lothar Matthäus scoring a penalty kick in Germany's quarterfinal against Bulgaria at Giants Stadium on July 10. Bulgaria came back to win the game.

Bulgaria was one of the biggest surprises of the tournament. The Bulgarians had never won a game in five previous World Cup appearances, but, led by Hristo Stoichkov, who would eventually share the tournament lead in scoring, they presented a formidable challenge for the title. The team won two of their three group games to qualify for the second round, where they advanced after a 3–1 penalty shootout win over Mexico. They then faced reigning world champions Germany in the quarterfinals, where goals from Stoichkov and Letchkov gave them a 2–1 victory. Bulgaria went on to finish in fourth place after losing to Italy in the semifinals and Sweden in the match for third place.

The host nation United States, after a 23rd-place finish in the 1990 tournament, advanced to the second round as one of the best third-place teams. They were eliminated in the Round of 16 in a 1–0 defeat to Brazil on Independence Day.

Brazil's win over the hosts helped take them to the final against Italy. Brazil's path was relatively smooth as they never trailed over 270 minutes of the knockout stage, defeating the Netherlands in the quarterfinals and Sweden in the semis after the aforementioned win over the hosts. The Italians meanwhile had made hard work of reaching the final. During the group stage, Italy struggled and narrowly advanced to the next round, despite losing 1–0 to the Republic of Ireland. Italian playmaker Roberto Baggio, who as the reigning FIFA World Player of the Year and Ballon D'Or holder, was expected to be one of the stars of the tournament, had not yet scored a goal. During the Round of 16 games against Nigeria, Italy was trailing 1–0 in the dying minutes when Baggio scored the tying goal, forcing the game into extra time. He scored again with a penalty kick to send Italy through. Baggio carried the Italians from there, scoring the game-winning goal in the quarterfinal against Spain, and both goals in Italy's semifinal victory over Bulgaria.

The match for third place was set between Bulgaria and Sweden, the team which scored more goals than any other in this World Cup with 15 over seven matches. These teams had also previously met in the qualifying group. Sweden won, 4–0. Swedish forward Tomas Brolin was named to the All-star team, alongside Bulgaria's Krasimir Balakov and Hristo Stoichkov. The 1994 FIFA World Cup was the last edition of the tournament in which bronze medals were also awarded to the team finishing fourth after losing the match for third place. Consequently, Bulgaria became the last fourth-placed team to receive bronze medals at a FIFA World Cup.

The final game at the Rose Bowl was tense but devoid of scoring chances. It was the second time in 24 years that the two nations had met in a final. After 120 goalless minutes, the World Cup was decided for the first time by a penalty shootout. After four rounds, Brazil led 3–2, and Baggio, playing injured, had to score to keep Italy's hopes alive. He missed by shooting it over the crossbar, and the Brazilians were crowned champions for the fourth time. After the game ended, Vice President Al Gore hosted the awarding ceremony by handing Brazilian captain Dunga the prestigious trophy; the Brazil national team dedicated the title to the deceased Formula One motor racing champion and countryman Ayrton Senna, who had died two and a half months prior.

The tournament's Golden Boot went jointly to Bulgaria's Stoichkov and Oleg Salenko of Russia, the latter becoming the first player to score five goals in a game, coming in a 6–1 victory against Cameroon. Both players scored six goals in the tournament. Brazilian striker Romário, with five goals, won the Golden Ball as the tournament's best player.

Despite some previous controversy, the U.S. staged a hugely successful tournament, with an average attendance of nearly 70,000, surpassing the previous record average attendance of 51,000 at the 1966 FIFA World Cup, thanks to the large seating capacities of the stadiums in the United States in comparison to the generally smaller venues of Europe and Latin America. To this day, the total attendance for the final tournament of nearly 3.6 million remains the highest in World Cup history, despite the expansion of the competition from 24 to 32 teams at the 1998 World Cup in France.

=== Opening ceremony ===
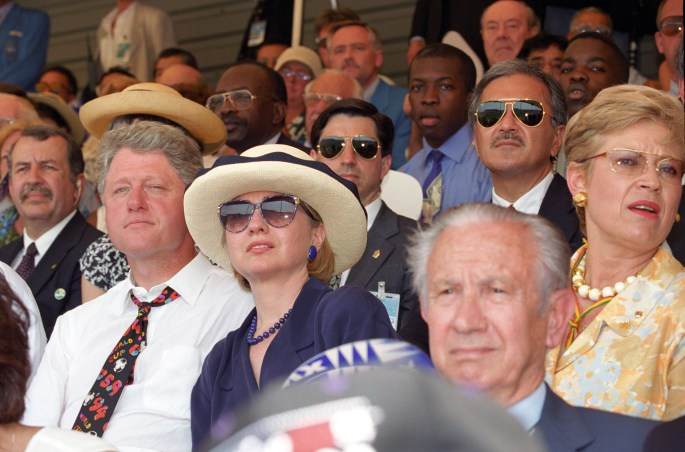
President Bill Clinton (left, white shirt) and First Lady Hillary Clinton (in blue, wearing sunglasses) watching the opening match in Chicago along the then International Olympic Committee president Juan Antonio Samaranch

The opening ceremony of the World Cup was held on June 17 at Chicago's Soldier Field. The ceremony was emceed by Oprah Winfrey, who introduced Diana Ross: she gave a musical performance. Ross was also intended to score a penalty at the beginning of her performance, with the goal then splitting in two as part of a pre-orchestrated stunt. Instead, she kicked the ball wide to the left, missing the goal, but the goalposts collapsed anyway in accordance with the stunt plans. In addition, Daryl Hall and Jon Secada also gave musical performances. It was officially opened by then-President Bill Clinton.

== Group stage ==
Times are Eastern Daylight Time (UTC−4) (East Rutherford, Foxborough, Orlando, Pontiac and Washington), Central Daylight Time (UTC−5) (Chicago and Dallas), and Pacific Daylight Time (UTC−7) (Pasadena and Stanford).

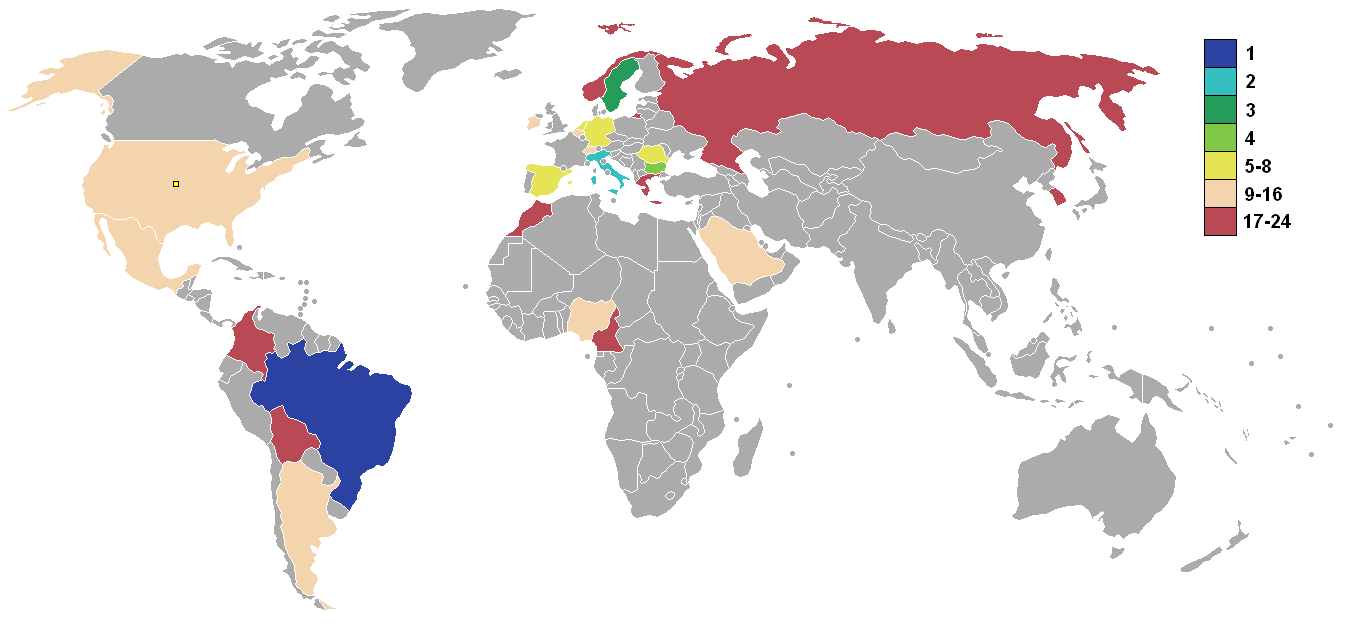
Champion Runner-up Third place Fourth place Quarterfinals Round of 16 Group stage

In the following tables:

- Pld = total games played
- W = total games won
- D = total games drawn (tied)
- L = total games lost
- GF = total goals scored (goals for)
- GA = total goals conceded (goals against)
- GD = goal difference (GF−GA)
- Pts = total points accumulated

=== Group A ===
The Group A game between the United States and Switzerland was the first to take place indoors, played under the roof at the Pontiac Silverdome.

Following the tournament, Colombian defender Andrés Escobar was shot dead on his return to Colombia, possibly in retaliation, after his own goal had contributed to his country's elimination.

Victories against Colombia and the United States (in front of a crowd of 93,869) were enough to see Romania through as group winners, despite a 4–1 hammering by Switzerland in between. The magnitude of that victory allowed Switzerland to move ahead of the United States on goal difference, although the hosts qualified for the second round as one of the best third-placed teams.

Switzerland's 4–1 victory over Romania came nearly 40 years to the date of Switzerland's last World Cup victory, also a 4–1 victory, on that occasion over Italy. The United States' 2–1 victory over Colombia was its first World Cup victory since their 1–0 upset over England in the 1950 World Cup.

Pos	Team	Pld	W	D	L	GF	GA	GD	Pts	Qualification
1	Romania	3	2	0	1	5	5	0	6	Advance to knockout stage
2	Switzerland	3	1	1	1	5	4	+1	4	Advance to knockout stage
3	United States (H)	3	1	1	1	3	3	0	4	Advance to knockout stage
4	Colombia	3	1	0	2	4	5	−1	3	

Source: FIFA
(H) Hosts
June 18, 1994
11:30 a.m. EDT (UTC–4)

United States	1–1	Switzerland
Wynalda 45'		Bregy 39'

Pontiac Silverdome, Pontiac
Attendance: 73,425
Referee: Francisco Oscar Lamolina (Argentina)
June 18, 1994
4:30 p.m. PDT (UTC–7)

Colombia	1–3	Romania
Valencia 43'		Răducioiu 16', 89'; Hagi 34'

Rose Bowl, Pasadena
Attendance: 91,856
Referee: Jamal Al Sharif (Syria)

June 22, 1994
4:00 p.m. EDT (UTC–4)

Romania	1–4	Switzerland
Hagi 35'		Sutter 16'; Chapuisat 52'; Knup 65', 72'

Pontiac Silverdome, Pontiac
Attendance: 61,428
Referee: Neji Jouini (Tunisia)
June 22, 1994
4:30 p.m. PDT (UTC–7)

United States	2–1	Colombia
Escobar 35' (o.g.); Stewart 52'		Valencia 90'

Rose Bowl, Pasadena
Attendance: 93,869
Referee: Fabio Baldas (Italy)

June 26, 1994
1:00 p.m. PDT (UTC–7)

Switzerland	0–2	Colombia
		Gaviria 44'; Lozano 90'

Stanford Stadium, Stanford
Attendance: 83,401
Referee: Peter Mikkelsen (Denmark)
June 26, 1994
1:00 p.m. PDT (UTC–7)

United States	0–1	Romania
		Petrescu 18'

Rose Bowl, Pasadena
Attendance: 93,869
Referee: Mario van der Ende (Netherlands)

=== Group B ===
Group B produced two of the four semifinalists of this World Cup — Brazil and Sweden — and was also one of the two groups in which only two, rather than three, sides progressed to the second round. The match between the two eliminated teams, Cameroon and Russia, broke two World Cup records. Oleg Salenko of Russia remains the only player to score five goals in a single World Cup game as Russia won 6–1. The goals also ensured that Salenko finished the tournament joint-top scorer with six goals, having previously bagged one against Sweden. Cameroon left a mark too as Roger Milla, at the age of 42, became the oldest World Cup goalscorer of all time, as he grabbed his side's consolation goal in the game. The result was not enough to take Russia through following losses to Brazil and Sweden. Brazil beat Cameroon, and then confirmed the top spot with a draw to Sweden.

The Swedes also progressed, finishing in second place with five points. Sweden's 3–1 victory over Russia was the nation's first World Cup victory since July 3, 1974. Russia failed to progress to the second round for the second time (accounting for the Soviet Union's results four years before), while Cameroon failed to repeat their surprise performance from the previous tournament.

Pos	Team	Pld	W	D	L	GF	GA	GD	Pts	Qualification
1	Brazil	3	2	1	0	6	1	+5	7	Advance to knockout stage
2	Sweden	3	1	2	0	6	4	+2	5	Advance to knockout stage
3	Russia	3	1	0	2	7	6	+1	3	
4	Cameroon	3	0	1	2	3	11	−8	1	

Source: FIFA
June 19, 1994
4:30 p.m. PDT (UTC–7)

Cameroon	2–2	Sweden
Embé 31'; Omam-Biyik 47'		Ljung 8'; Dahlin 75'

Rose Bowl, Pasadena
Attendance: 93,194
Referee: Alberto Tejada Noriega (Peru)
June 20, 1994
1:00 p.m. PDT (UTC–7)

Brazil	2–0	Russia
Romário 26'; Raí 52' (pen.)

Stanford Stadium, Stanford
Attendance: 81,061
Referee: Lim Kee Chong (Mauritius)

June 24, 1994
1:00 p.m. PDT (UTC–7)

Brazil	3–0	Cameroon
Romário 39'; Márcio Santos 66'; Bebeto 73'

Stanford Stadium, Stanford
Attendance: 83,401
Referee: Arturo Brizio Carter (Mexico)
June 24, 1994
7:30 p.m. EDT (UTC–4)

Sweden	3–1	Russia
Brolin 39' (pen.); Dahlin 60', 82'		Salenko 4' (pen.)

Pontiac Silverdome, Pontiac
Attendance: 71,528
Referee: Joël Quiniou (France)

June 28, 1994
1:00 p.m. PDT (UTC–7)

Russia	6–1	Cameroon
Salenko 15', 41', 44' (pen.), 72', 75'; Radchenko 81'		Milla 46'

Stanford Stadium, Stanford
Attendance: 74,914
Referee: Jamal Al Sharif (Syria)
June 28, 1994
4:00 p.m. EDT (UTC–4)

Brazil	1–1	Sweden
Romário 47'		K. Andersson 23'

Pontiac Silverdome, Pontiac
Attendance: 77,217
Referee: Sándor Puhl (Hungary)

=== Group C ===
As was the case with Group B, Group C would only send two teams into the Round of 16 as Spain and defending champions Germany progressed to round two. Coming from two goals down with four minutes left to snatch a 2–2 draw against Spain, the South Koreans very nearly eclipsed that feat against Germany when they came from 3–0 down to lose narrowly 3–2. In spite of these comebacks, South Korea was held to a 0–0 draw against Bolivia in their other group game when a win would have seen them through. Spain's late implosion against the South Koreans effectively decided that it would be Germany who won the group and not them.

Germany, who defeated Bolivia 1–0 in the tournament's opening game, finished with seven points. Spain had to settle for second place despite leading in all three games.

Despite Bolivia finishing last in the group, Erwin Sanchez made team history after scoring the nation's first World Cup goal in a 3–1 loss to Spain. Prior to 1994, Bolivia had never scored in either of their previous appearances at the 1930 and 1950 World Cups.

Pos	Team	Pld	W	D	L	GF	GA	GD	Pts	Qualification
1	Germany	3	2	1	0	5	3	+2	7	Advance to knockout stage
2	Spain	3	1	2	0	6	4	+2	5	Advance to knockout stage
3	South Korea	3	0	2	1	4	5	−1	2	
4	Bolivia	3	0	1	2	1	4	−3	1	

Source: FIFA
June 17, 1994
2:00 p.m. CDT

Germany	1–0	Bolivia
Klinsmann 61'

Soldier Field, Chicago
Attendance: 63,117
Referee: Arturo Brizio Carter (Mexico)
June 17, 1994
6:30 p.m. CDT

Spain	2–2	South Korea
Salinas 51'; Goikoetxea 55'		Hong Myung-bo 85'; Seo Jung-won 90'

Cotton Bowl, Dallas
Attendance: 56,247
Referee: Peter Mikkelsen (Denmark)

June 21, 1994
3:00 p.m. CDT

Germany	1–1	Spain
Klinsmann 48'		Goikoetxea 14'

Soldier Field, Chicago
Attendance: 63,113
Referee: Filippi Cavani (Uruguay)
June 23, 1994
7:30 p.m. EDT

South Korea	0–0	Bolivia

Foxboro Stadium, Foxborough
Attendance: 54,453
Referee: Leslie Mottram (Scotland)

June 27, 1994
3:00 p.m. CDT

Bolivia	1–3	Spain
E. Sánchez 67'		Guardiola 19' (pen.); Caminero 66', 70'

Soldier Field, Chicago
Attendance: 63,089
Referee: Rodrigo Badilla (Costa Rica)
June 27, 1994
3:00 p.m. CDT

Germany	3–2	South Korea
Klinsmann 12', 37'; Riedle 20'		Hwang Sun-hong 52'; Hong Myung-bo 63'

Cotton Bowl, Dallas
Attendance: 63,998
Referee: Joël Quiniou (France)

=== Group D ===
Tournament favorites Argentina led by Diego Maradona collected a maximum of six points from their opening two games after dominating Greece 4–0 in Foxboro with a Gabriel Batistuta hattrick before winning a close match against a formidable Nigeria with a 2–1 victory on the same field four days later; despite this Argentina finished third in the group. Nigeria had been very impressive on their World Cup debut, and despite the narrow loss to Argentina, had emerged as group winners following victories against Bulgaria and Greece, the latter in which Nigeria doubled its lead late on a goal from Daniel Amokachi – a goal that would allow Nigeria to top its group. Maradona only played with Argentina during their first two games, both in Foxborough (playing Greece and Nigeria and scoring his last ever World Cup goal against the former); he was thrown out of the tournament after testing positive for ephedrine.

Having qualified for the tournament through a last-gasp goal against France, Bulgaria surprised many people, as the nation had never even won a game at the World Cup finals prior to this tournament. Despite losing its opening game 3–0 to Nigeria, Bulgaria came back in style with a 4–0 win over neighbor Greece (who had suffered exactly the same fate five days earlier against Argentina), and a 2–0 win against Argentina saw them advance. Argentina had actually been winning the group going into injury time, while Bulgaria played the last 25 minutes with 10 men; however, a 91st-minute header from Nasko Sirakov meant that Argentina dropped two places and finished third. Nigeria won the group on goal difference. Bulgaria's victory over Argentina earned them second place.

Pos	Team	Pld	W	D	L	GF	GA	GD	Pts	Qualification
1	Nigeria	3	2	0	1	6	2	+4	6	Advance to knockout stage
2	Bulgaria	3	2	0	1	6	3	+3	6 (Note: Head-to-head result: Argentina 0–2 Bulgaria.)	Advance to knockout stage
3	Argentina	3	2	0	1	6	3	+3	6	Advance to knockout stage
4	Greece	3	0	0	3	0	10	−10	0	

Source: FIFA
Notes:
June 21, 1994
12:30 p.m. EDT

Argentina	4–0	Greece
Batistuta 2', 45', 90+2' (pen.); Maradona 60'

Foxboro Stadium, Foxborough
Attendance: 54,456
Referee: Arturo Angeles (United States)
June 21, 1994
6:30 p.m. CDT

Nigeria	3–0	Bulgaria
Yekini 21'; Amokachi 43'; Amunike 55'

Cotton Bowl, Dallas
Attendance: 44,132
Referee: Rodrigo Badilla (Costa Rica)

June 25, 1994
4:00 p.m. EDT

Argentina	2–1	Nigeria
Caniggia 21', 28'		Siasia 8'

Foxboro Stadium, Foxborough
Attendance: 54,453
Referee: Bo Karlsson (Sweden)
June 26, 1994
11:30 a.m. CDT

Bulgaria	4–0	Greece
Stoichkov 5' (pen.), 55' (pen.); Letchkov 65'; Borimirov 90'

Soldier Field, Chicago
Attendance: 63,160
Referee: Ali Bujsaim (United Arab Emirates)

June 30, 1994
6:30 p.m. CDT

Argentina	0–2	Bulgaria
		Stoichkov 61'; Sirakov 90+3'

Cotton Bowl, Dallas
Attendance: 63,998
Referee: Neji Jouini (Tunisia)
June 30, 1994
7:30 p.m. EDT

Greece	0–2	Nigeria
		George 45+2'; Amokachi 90+5'

Foxboro Stadium, Foxborough
Attendance: 53,001
Referee: Leslie Mottram (Scotland)

=== Group E ===
Luca Marchegiani of Italy makes a save against Norway in a Group E match at Giants Stadium

Group E remains the only group in World Cup history in which all four teams finished with the same points. All four teams even had the same goal difference. It began at Giants Stadium where Ray Houghton's chip ensured a shock Irish victory over the then-three-time champions Italy by 1–0, as well as gaining a measure of revenge for the previous World Cup, in which Italy both hosted and eliminated Ireland at the quarterfinal stage. The next day in Washington, Norway played its first World Cup game since 1938 and Kjetil Rekdal's goal five minutes from time proved decisive in an equally tense encounter as Norway beat Mexico.

In the second round of group play, Luis García's double had Mexico 2–0 up and in control of the game before a disagreement on the touchline resulted in fines for both Republic of Ireland's manager, Jack Charlton, and their striker John Aldridge. Aldridge was able to regain concentration in time to score six minutes from the end of the game to make it 2–1. Despite their loss, Aldridge's goal proved crucial to Ireland in the final group standings.

During the previous day at Giants Stadium in New Jersey, Italy's World Cup hopes seemed to be diminishing fast as goalkeeper Gianluca Pagliuca was sent off with the game still at 0–0. Yet despite this, Italy was still able to salvage an important 1–0 victory. Norway would ultimately pay a price for their inability to take advantage of Pagliuca's dismissal. In the final group game, the Republic of Ireland qualified after a dreary 0–0 draw with Norway; while Massaro and Bernal traded strikes as Italy and Mexico played to a 1–1 draw.

Those results meant that Mexico won the group on goals scored, with three in the group. With Ireland and Italy also progressing having finished with identical records, the Irish team qualified as second place as a result of their victory against the Italians. Despite having only conceded one goal, Norway exited the tournament on goals scored; their solo goal against Mexico proving inadequate to qualify for the round of 16.

Pos	Team	Pld	W	D	L	GF	GA	GD	Pts	Qualification
1	Mexico	3	1	1	1	3	3	0	4	Advance to knockout stage
2	Republic of Ireland	3	1	1	1	2	2	0	4 (Note: Head-to-head result: Italy 0–1 Republic of Ireland.)	Advance to knockout stage
3	Italy	3	1	1	1	2	2	0	4	Advance to knockout stage
4	Norway	3	1	1	1	1	1	0	4	

Source: FIFA
Notes:
June 18, 1994
4:00 p.m. EDT (UTC–4)

Italy	0–1	Republic of Ireland
		Houghton 12'

Giants Stadium, East Rutherford
Attendance: 75,338
Referee: Mario van der Ende (Netherlands)
June 19, 1994
4:00 p.m. EDT (UTC–4)

Norway	1–0	Mexico
Rekdal 84'

RFK Stadium, Washington, D.C.
Attendance: 52,395
Referee: Sándor Puhl (Hungary)

June 23, 1994
4:00 p.m. EDT (UTC–4)

Italy	1–0	Norway
D. Baggio 69'

Giants Stadium, East Rutherford
Attendance: 74,624
Referee: Hellmut Krug (Germany)
June 24, 1994
12:30 p.m. EDT (UTC–4)

Mexico	2–1	Republic of Ireland
García 42', 65'		Aldridge 84'

Citrus Bowl, Orlando
Attendance: 60,790
Referee: Kurt Röthlisberger (Switzerland)

June 28, 1994
12:30 p.m. EDT (UTC–4)

Italy	1–1	Mexico
Massaro 48'		Bernal 57'

RFK Stadium, Washington, D.C.
Attendance: 52,535
Referee: Francisco Oscar Lamolina (Argentina)
June 28, 1994
12:30 p.m. EDT (UTC–4)

Republic of Ireland	0–0	Norway

Giants Stadium, East Rutherford
Attendance: 72,404
Referee: José Torres Cadena (Colombia)

=== Group F ===
Just as happened to Argentina in Group D, Belgium endured the same fate in Group F. Despite winning both of its first two matches 1–0 against Morocco and neighbors Netherlands, Belgium finished third as, in an upset, it lost to tournament newcomers Saudi Arabia 1–0 in the third game. During that game, Saudi player Saaed Al-Owairan ran from his own half through a maze of Belgian players to score the game's only goal.

Saudi Arabia advanced through to the Round of 16 as well, having also defeated Morocco 2–1. The Netherlands endured a somewhat nervier experience. The opening 2–1 victory against Saudi Arabia was followed by the 1–0 loss against Belgium before another 2–1 victory against Morocco, with Bryan Roy scoring the winner a mere 12 minutes from time, saw the Dutch win the group having scored more goals than Belgium and beaten Saudi Arabia. Morocco, despite losing all three of their group games, did not leave without a fight, as each of their losses were by just a single goal, 1–0 to Belgium, 2–1 to Saudi Arabia, and 2–1 to the Netherlands.

Pos	Team	Pld	W	D	L	GF	GA	GD	Pts	Qualification
1	Netherlands	3	2	0	1	4	3	+1	6 (Note: Head-to-head result: Netherlands 2–1 Saudi Arabia.)	Advance to knockout stage
2	Saudi Arabia	3	2	0	1	4	3	+1	6	Advance to knockout stage
3	Belgium	3	2	0	1	2	1	+1	6	Advance to knockout stage
4	Morocco	3	0	0	3	2	5	−3	0	

Source: FIFA
Notes:
June 19, 1994
12:30 p.m. EDT

Belgium	1–0	Morocco
Degryse 11'

Citrus Bowl, Orlando
Attendance: 61,219
Referee: José Torres Cadena (Colombia)
June 20, 1994
7:30 p.m. EDT

Netherlands	2–1	Saudi Arabia
Jonk 50'; Taument 86'		Anwar 18'

RFK Stadium, Washington, D.C.
Attendance: 50,535
Referee: Manuel Díaz Vega (Spain)

June 25, 1994
12:30 p.m. EDT

Belgium	1–0	Netherlands
Albert 65'

Citrus Bowl, Orlando
Attendance: 62,387
Referee: Renato Marsiglia (Brazil)
June 25, 1994
12:30 p.m. EDT

Saudi Arabia	2–1	Morocco
Al-Jaber 7' (pen.); Anwar 45'		Chaouch 26'

Giants Stadium, East Rutherford
Attendance: 76,322
Referee: Philip Don (England)

June 29, 1994
12:30 p.m. EDT

Belgium	0–1	Saudi Arabia
		Al-Owairan 5'

RFK Stadium, Washington, D.C.
Attendance: 52,959
Referee: Hellmut Krug (Germany)
June 29, 1994
12:30 p.m. EDT

Morocco	1–2	Netherlands
Nader 47'		Bergkamp 43'; Roy 77'

Citrus Bowl, Orlando
Attendance: 60,578
Referee: Alberto Tejada Noriega (Peru)

=== Ranking of third-placed teams ===
Pos	Grp	Team	Pld	W	D	L	GF	GA	GD	Pts	Qualification
1	D	Argentina	3	2	0	1	6	3	+3	6	Advance to knockout stage
2	F	Belgium	3	2	0	1	2	1	+1	6	Advance to knockout stage
3	A	United States	3	1	1	1	3	3	0	4	Advance to knockout stage
4	E	Italy	3	1	1	1	2	2	0	4	Advance to knockout stage
5	B	Russia	3	1	0	2	7	6	+1	3	
6	C	South Korea	3	0	2	1	4	5	−1	2	

Source: FIFA

== Knockout stage ==
=== Bracket ===
Round of 16
July 3 – Pasadena
Romania	3
Argentina	2
July 3 – Dallas
Saudi Arabia	1
Sweden	3
July 4 – Orlando
Netherlands	2
Republic of Ireland	0
July 4 – Stanford
Brazil	1
United States	0
July 5 – East Rutherford
Mexico	1 (1)
Bulgaria (p)	1 (3)
July 2 – Chicago
Germany	3
Belgium	2
July 5 – Foxborough
Nigeria	1
Italy (a.e.t.)	2
July 2 – Washington
Spain	3
Switzerland	0

Quarterfinals
July 10 – Stanford
Romania	2 (4)
Sweden (p)	2 (5)
July 9 – Dallas
Netherlands	2
Brazil	3
July 10 – East Rutherford
Bulgaria	2
Germany	1
July 9 – Foxborough
Italy	2
Spain	1

Semifinals
July 13 – Pasadena
Sweden	0
Brazil	1
July 13 – East Rutherford
Bulgaria	1
Italy	2

Final
July 17 – Pasadena
Brazil (p)	0 (3)
Italy	0 (2)
Match for third place
July 16 – Pasadena
Sweden	4
Bulgaria	0

=== Round of 16 ===
July 2, 1994
12:00 p.m. CDT (UTC–5)

Germany	3–2	Belgium
Völler 6', 38'; Klinsmann 11'		Grün 8'; Albert 90'

Soldier Field, Chicago
Attendance: 60,246
Referee: Kurt Röthlisberger (Switzerland)

July 2, 1994
4:30 p.m. EDT (UTC–4)

Spain	3–0	Switzerland
Hierro 15'; Luis Enrique 74'; Begiristain 86' (pen.)

RFK Stadium, Washington, D.C.
Attendance: 53,121
Referee: Mario van der Ende (Netherlands)

July 3, 1994
12:00 p.m. CDT (UTC–5)

Saudi Arabia	1–3	Sweden
Al-Ghesheyan 85'		Dahlin 6'; K. Andersson 51', 88'

Cotton Bowl, Dallas
Attendance: 60,277
Referee: Renato Marsiglia (Brazil)

July 3, 1994
1:30 p.m. PDT (UTC–7)

Romania	3–2	Argentina
Dumitrescu 11', 18'; Hagi 58'		Batistuta 16' (pen.); Balbo 75'

Rose Bowl, Pasadena
Attendance: 90,469
Referee: Pierluigi Pairetto (Italy)

July 4, 1994
12:00 p.m. EDT (UTC–4)

Netherlands	2–0	Republic of Ireland
Bergkamp 11'; Jonk 41'

Citrus Bowl, Orlando
Attendance: 61,355
Referee: Peter Mikkelsen (Denmark)

July 4, 1994
12:30 p.m. PDT (UTC–7)

Brazil	1–0	United States
Bebeto 72'

Stanford Stadium, Stanford
Attendance: 84,147
Referee: Joël Quiniou (France)

July 5, 1994
1:00 p.m. EDT (UTC–4)

Nigeria	1–2 (a.e.t.)	Italy
Amunike 25'		R. Baggio 88', 102' (pen.)

Foxboro Stadium, Foxborough
Attendance: 54,367
Referee: Arturo Brizio Carter (Mexico)

July 5, 1994
4:30 p.m. EDT (UTC–4)

Mexico	1–1 (a.e.t.)	Bulgaria
García Aspe 18' (pen.)		Stoichkov 6'
Penalties
García Aspe (penalty missed); Bernal (penalty missed); Rodríguez (penalty missed); Suárez (penalty scored)	1–3	(penalty missed) Balakov; (penalty scored) Genchev; (penalty scored) Borimirov; (penalty scored) Letchkov

Giants Stadium, East Rutherford
Attendance: 71,030
Referee: Jamal Al Sharif (Syria)

=== Quarterfinals ===
July 9, 1994
12:00 p.m. EDT (UTC–4)

Italy	2–1	Spain
D. Baggio 25'; R. Baggio 88'		Caminero 58'

Foxboro Stadium, Foxborough
Attendance: 53,400
Referee: Sándor Puhl (Hungary)

July 9, 1994
2:30 p.m. CDT (UTC–5)

Netherlands	2–3	Brazil
Bergkamp 64'; Winter 76'		Romário 53'; Bebeto 63'; Branco 81'

Cotton Bowl, Dallas
Attendance: 63,500
Referee: Rodrigo Badilla (Costa Rica)

July 10, 1994
12:00 p.m. EDT (UTC–4)

Bulgaria	2–1	Germany
Stoichkov 75'; Letchkov 78'		Matthäus 47' (pen.)

Giants Stadium, East Rutherford
Attendance: 72,000
Referee: José Torres Cadena (Colombia)

July 10, 1994
12:30 p.m. PDT (UTC-7)

Romania	2–2 (a.e.t.)	Sweden
Răducioiu 88', 101'		Brolin 78'; K. Andersson 115'
Penalties
Răducioiu (penalty scored); Hagi (penalty scored); Lupescu (penalty scored); Petrescu (penalty missed); Dumitrescu (penalty scored); Belodedici (penalty missed)	4–5	(penalty missed) Mild; (penalty scored) K. Andersson; (penalty scored) Brolin; (penalty scored) Ingesson; (penalty scored) R. Nilsson; (penalty scored) Larsson

Stanford Stadium, Stanford
Attendance: 83,500
Referee: Philip Don (England)

=== Semifinals ===
July 13, 1994
4:00 p.m. EDT (UTC–4)

Bulgaria	1–2	Italy
Stoichkov 44' (pen.)		R. Baggio 21', 25'

Giants Stadium, East Rutherford
Attendance: 74,110
Referee: Joël Quiniou (France)

July 13, 1994
4:30 p.m. PDT (UTC–7)

Sweden	0–1	Brazil
		Romário 80'

Rose Bowl, Pasadena
Attendance: 91,856
Referee: José Torres Cadena (Colombia)

=== Match for third place ===
July 16, 1994
12:30 p.m. PDT (UTC–7)

Sweden	4–0	Bulgaria
Brolin 8'; Mild 30'; Larsson 37'; K. Andersson 39'

Rose Bowl, Pasadena
Attendance: 91,500
Referee: Ali Bujsaim (United Arab Emirates)

=== Final ===
July 17, 1994
12:30 p.m. PDT (UTC−7)

Brazil	0–0 (a.e.t.)	Italy
Penalties
Márcio Santos (penalty missed); Romário (penalty scored); Branco (penalty scored); Dunga (penalty scored)	3–2	(penalty missed) Baresi; (penalty scored) Albertini; (penalty scored) Evani; (penalty missed) Massaro; (penalty missed) R. Baggio

Rose Bowl, Pasadena
Attendance: 94,194
Referee: Sándor Puhl (Hungary)

== Statistics ==
=== Goalscorers ===
Hristo Stoichkov and Oleg Salenko received the Golden Boot for scoring six goals. In total, 141 goals were scored by 81 players, with only one of them credited as an own goal.

6 goals

- (Bulgaria) Hristo Stoichkov
- (Russia) Oleg Salenko

5 goals

- (Brazil) Romário
- (Italy) Roberto Baggio
- (Germany) Jürgen Klinsmann
- (Sweden) Kennet Andersson

4 goals

- (Argentina) Gabriel Batistuta
- (Romania) Florin Răducioiu
- (Sweden) Martin Dahlin

3 goals

- (Brazil) Bebeto
- (Netherlands) Dennis Bergkamp
- (Romania) Gheorghe Hagi
- (Spain) José Luis Caminero
- (Sweden) Tomas Brolin

2 goals

- (Argentina) Claudio Caniggia
- (Belgium) Philippe Albert
- (Bulgaria) Yordan Letchkov
- (Colombia) Adolfo Valencia
- (Germany) Rudi Völler
- (Italy) Dino Baggio
- (South Korea) Hong Myung-bo
- (Mexico) Luis García
- (Netherlands) Wim Jonk
- (Nigeria) Daniel Amokachi
- (Nigeria) Emmanuel Amunike
- (Romania) Ilie Dumitrescu
- (Saudi Arabia) Fuad Anwar
- (Spain) Jon Andoni Goikoetxea
- (Switzerland) Adrian Knup

1 goal

- (Argentina) Abel Balbo
- (Argentina) Diego Maradona
- (Belgium) Marc Degryse
- (Belgium) Georges Grün
- (Bolivia) Erwin Sánchez
- (Brazil) Branco
- (Brazil) Márcio Santos
- (Brazil) Raí
- (Bulgaria) Daniel Borimirov
- (Bulgaria) Nasko Sirakov
- (Cameroon) David Embé
- (Cameroon) Roger Milla
- (Cameroon) François Omam-Biyik
- (Colombia) Hermán Gaviria
- (Colombia) John Harold Lozano
- (Germany) Lothar Matthäus
- (Germany) Karl-Heinz Riedle
- (Republic of Ireland) John Aldridge
- (Republic of Ireland) Ray Houghton
- (Italy) Daniele Massaro
- (South Korea) Hwang Sun-hong
- (South Korea) Seo Jung-won
- (Morocco) Mohammed Chaouch
- (Morocco) Hassan Nader
- (Mexico) Marcelino Bernal
- (Mexico) Alberto García Aspe
- (Netherlands) Bryan Roy
- (Netherlands) Gaston Taument
- (Netherlands) Aron Winter
- (Nigeria) Finidi George
- (Nigeria) Samson Siasia
- (Nigeria) Rashidi Yekini
- (Norway) Kjetil Rekdal
- (Romania) Dan Petrescu
- (Russia) Dmitri Radchenko
- (Saudi Arabia) Fahad Al-Ghesheyan
- (Saudi Arabia) Sami Al-Jaber
- (Saudi Arabia) Saeed Al-Owairan
- (Spain) Txiki Begiristain
- (Spain) Pep Guardiola
- (Spain) Fernando Hierro
- (Spain) Luis Enrique
- (Spain) Julio Salinas
- (Sweden) Henrik Larsson
- (Sweden) Roger Ljung
- (Sweden) Håkan Mild
- (Switzerland) Georges Bregy
- (Switzerland) Stéphane Chapuisat
- (Switzerland) Alain Sutter
- (United States) Earnie Stewart
- (United States) Eric Wynalda

Own goals

- (Colombia) Andrés Escobar (against the United States)

=== Discipline ===
Player	Offence(s)	Suspension(s)
(Bolivia) Marco Etcheverry	(red card) in Group C vs Germany (matchday 1; 17 June)	Group C vs South Korea (matchday 2; 23 June); Group C vs Spain (matchday 3; 27 June)
(Spain) Miguel Ángel Nadal	(red card) in Group C vs South Korea (matchday 1; 17 June)	Group C vs Germany (matchday 2; 21 June); Group C vs Bolivia (matchday 3; 27 June)
(Romania) Ion Vlădoiu	(red card) in Group A vs Switzerland (matchday 2; 22 June)	Group A vs United States (matchday 3; 26 June); Round of 16 vs Argentina (3 July); Quarterfinals vs Sweden (10 July)
(Italy) Gianluca Pagliuca	(red card) in Group E vs Norway (matchday 2; 23 June)	Group E vs Mexico (matchday 3; 28 June); Round of 16 vs Nigeria (5 July)
(Norway) Alf-Inge Haaland	(yellow card) in Group E vs Mexico (matchday 1; 19 June); (yellow card) in Group E vs Italy (matchday 2; 23 June)	Group E vs Republic of Ireland (matchday 3; 28 June)
(Bolivia) Julio César Baldivieso	(yellow card) in Group C vs Germany (matchday 1; 17 June); (yellow card) in Group C vs South Korea (matchday 2; 23 June)	Group C vs Spain (matchday 3; 27 June)
(Bolivia) Luis Cristaldo	(yellow card) (yellow-red card) in Group C vs South Korea (matchday 2; 23 June)	Group C vs Spain (matchday 3; 27 June)
(Republic of Ireland) Denis Irwin	(yellow card) in Group E vs Italy (matchday 1; 18 June); (yellow card) in Group E vs Mexico (matchday 2; 24 June)	Group E vs Norway (matchday 3; 28 June)
(Republic of Ireland) Terry Phelan	(yellow card) in Group E vs Italy (matchday 1; 18 June); (yellow card) in Group E vs Mexico (matchday 2; 24 June)	Group E vs Norway (matchday 3; 28 June)
(Cameroon) Rigobert Song	(red card) in Group B vs Brazil (matchday 2; 24 June)	Group B vs Russia (matchday 3; 28 June)
(Russia) Sergei Gorlukovich	(yellow card) (yellow-red card) in Group B vs Sweden (matchday 2; 24 June)	Group B vs Cameroon (matchday 3; 28 June)
(Sweden) Martin Dahlin	(yellow card) in Group B vs Cameroon (matchday 1; 19 June); (yellow card) in Group B vs Russia (matchday 2; 24 June)	Group B vs Brazil (matchday 3; 28 June)
(Saudi Arabia) Fuad Anwar	(yellow card) in Group F vs Netherlands (matchday 1; 20 June); (yellow card) in Group F vs Morocco (matchday 2; 25 June)	Group F vs Belgium (matchday 3; 29 June)
(Morocco) Noureddine Naybet	(yellow card) in Group F vs Belgium (matchday 1; 19 June); (yellow card) in Group F vs Saudi Arabia (matchday 2; 25 June)	Group F vs Netherlands (matchday 3; 29 June)
(Argentina) Diego Maradona	Doping ban after Group D vs Nigeria (matchday 2; 25 June)	Group D vs Bulgaria (matchday 3; 30 June); Round of 16 vs Romania (3 July)
(United States) John Harkes	(yellow card) in Group A vs Switzerland (matchday 1; 18 June); (yellow card) in Group A vs Romania (matchday 3; 26 June)	Round of 16 vs Brazil (4 July)
(Romania) Florin Răducioiu	(yellow card) in Group A vs Colombia (matchday 1; 18 June); (yellow card) in Group A vs United States (matchday 3; 26 June)	Round of 16 vs Argentina (3 July)
(Spain) José Luis Caminero	(yellow card) in Group C vs South Korea (matchday 1; 17 June); (yellow card) in Group C vs Bolivia (matchday 3; 27 June)	Round of 16 vs Switzerland (2 July)
(Germany) Stefan Effenberg	(yellow card) in Group C vs Spain (matchday 2; 21 June); (yellow card) in Group C vs South Korea (matchday 3; 27 June)	Round of 16 vs Belgium (2 July)
(Mexico) Joaquín del Olmo	(yellow card) in Group E vs Republic of Ireland (matchday 2; 24 June); (yellow card) in Group E vs Italy (matchday 3; 28 June)	Round of 16 vs Bulgaria (5 July)
(Netherlands) Jan Wouters	(yellow card) in Group F vs Belgium (matchday 2; 25 June); (yellow card) in Group F vs Morocco (matchday 3; 29 June)	Round of 16 vs Republic of Ireland (4 July)
(Bulgaria) Zlatko Yankov	(yellow card) in Group D vs Greece (matchday 2; 26 June); (yellow card) in Group D vs Argentina (matchday 3; 30 June)	Round of 16 vs Mexico (5 July)
(Bulgaria) Trifon Ivanov	(yellow card) in Group D vs Greece (matchday 2; 26 June); (yellow card) in Group D vs Argentina (matchday 3; 30 June)	Round of 16 vs Mexico (5 July)
(Bulgaria) Tsanko Tsvetanov	(yellow card) (yellow-red card) in Group D vs Argentina (matchday 3; 30 June)	Round of 16 vs Mexico (5 July)
(Brazil) Leonardo	(red card) in Round of 16 vs United States (4 July)	Quarterfinals vs Netherlands (9 July); Semifinals vs Sweden (13 July); Final vs Italy (17 July)
(United States) Fernando Clavijo	(yellow card) (yellow-red card) in Round of 16 vs Brazil (4 July)	Suspension served outside tournament
(Italy) Gianfranco Zola	(red card) in Round of 16 vs Nigeria (5 July)	Quarterfinals vs Spain (9 July); Semifinals vs Bulgaria (13 July)
(Bulgaria) Emil Kremenliev	(yellow card) (yellow-red card) in Round of 16 vs Mexico (5 July)	Quarterfinals vs Germany (10 July)
(Mexico) Luis García	(yellow card) (yellow-red card) in Round of 16 vs Bulgaria (5 July)	Suspension served outside tournament
(Italy) Mauro Tassotti	Elbow on Luis Enrique in Quarterfinals vs Spain (9 July)	Semifinals vs Bulgaria (13 July); Final vs Brazil (17 July)
(Sweden) Stefan Schwarz	(yellow card) (yellow-red card) in Quarterfinals vs Romania (10 July)	Semifinals vs Brazil (13 July)
(Italy) Alessandro Costacurta	(yellow card) in Round of 16 vs Nigeria (5 July); (yellow card) in Semifinals vs Bulgaria (13 July)	Final vs Brazil (17 July)
(Sweden) Roger Ljung	(yellow card) in Round of 16 vs Saudi Arabia (3 July); (yellow card) in Semifinals vs Brazil (13 July)	Match for third place vs Bulgaria (16 July)
(Sweden) Jonas Thern	(red card) in Semifinals vs Brazil (13 July)	Match for third place vs Bulgaria (16 July)

=== Awards ===
Golden Shoe	Golden Ball	Yashin Award	Best Young Player	FIFA Fair Play Trophy	Most Entertaining Team
(Bulgaria) Hristo Stoichkov (Russia) Oleg Salenko	(Brazil) Romário	(Belgium) Michel Preud'homme	(Netherlands) Marc Overmars	Brazil	Brazil

=== All-star team ===
The All-star team is a squad consisting of the eleven most impressive players at the 1994 World Cup, as selected by FIFA's Technical Study Group.

Goalkeeper	Defenders	Midfielders	Forwards
(Belgium) Michel Preud'homme	(Brazil) Jorginho (Brazil) Márcio Santos (Italy) Paolo Maldini	(Brazil) Dunga (Bulgaria) Krasimir Balakov (Romania) Gheorghe Hagi (Sweden) Tomas Brolin	(Brazil) Romário (Bulgaria) Hristo Stoichkov (Italy) Roberto Baggio

=== Tournament ranking ===
Per statistical convention in soccer, matches decided in extra time are counted as wins and losses, while matches decided by penalty shootouts are counted as draws.

Pos	Grp	Team	Pld	W	D	L	GF	GA	GD	Pts	Final result
1	B	Brazil	7	5	2	0	11	3	+8	17	Champion
2	E	Italy	7	4	2	1	8	5	+3	14	Runner-up
3	B	Sweden	7	3	3	1	15	8	+7	12	Third place
4	D	Bulgaria	7	3	1	3	10	11	−1	10	Fourth place
5	C	Germany	5	3	1	1	9	7	+2	10	Eliminated in quarter-finals
6	A	Romania	5	3	1	1	10	9	+1	10	Eliminated in quarter-finals
7	F	Netherlands	5	3	0	2	8	6	+2	9	Eliminated in quarter-finals
8	C	Spain	5	2	2	1	10	6	+4	8	Eliminated in quarter-finals
9	D	Nigeria	4	2	0	2	7	4	+3	6	Eliminated in round of 16
10	D	Argentina	4	2	0	2	8	6	+2	6	Eliminated in round of 16
11	F	Belgium	4	2	0	2	4	4	0	6	Eliminated in round of 16
12	F	Saudi Arabia	4	2	0	2	5	6	−1	6	Eliminated in round of 16
13	E	Mexico	4	1	2	1	4	4	0	5	Eliminated in round of 16
14	A	United States (H)	4	1	1	2	3	4	−1	4	Eliminated in round of 16
15	A	Switzerland	4	1	1	2	5	7	−2	4	Eliminated in round of 16
16	E	Republic of Ireland	4	1	1	2	2	4	−2	4	Eliminated in round of 16
17	E	Norway	3	1	1	1	1	1	0	4	Eliminated in group stage
18	B	Russia	3	1	0	2	7	6	+1	3	Eliminated in group stage
19	A	Colombia	3	1	0	2	4	5	−1	3	Eliminated in group stage
20	C	South Korea	3	0	2	1	4	5	−1	2	Eliminated in group stage
21	C	Bolivia	3	0	1	2	1	4	−3	1	Eliminated in group stage
22	B	Cameroon	3	0	1	2	3	11	−8	1	Eliminated in group stage
23	F	Morocco	3	0	0	3	2	5	−3	0	Eliminated in group stage
24	D	Greece	3	0	0	3	0	10	−10	0	Eliminated in group stage

Source: FIFA
(H) Hosts

=== Disciplinary statistics ===
- Total number of yellow cards: 235
- Average yellow cards per game: 4.52
- Total number of red cards: 15
- Average red cards per match: 0.29
- First yellow card of the tournament: Jürgen Kohler – Germany against Bolivia
- First red card of the tournament: Marco Etcheverry – Bolivia against Germany
- Fastest yellow card from kick off: 1 minute – Sergei Gorlukovich – Russia against Sweden
- Fastest yellow card after coming on as substitute: 2 minutes – Daniel Borimirov – Bulgaria against Greece (introduced in the 82nd minute)
- Latest yellow card in a game without extra time: 90 minutes – José Luis Caminero – Spain against Bolivia, Yuri Nikiforov – Russia against Cameroon, Mohamed Al-Deayea – Saudi Arabia against Morocco
- Latest yellow card in a game with extra time: 108 minutes – Basarab Panduru – Romania against Sweden
- Fastest dismissal from kick off: 21 minutes – Gianluca Pagliuca – Italy against Norway
- Fastest dismissal of a substitute: 3 minutes – Ion Vlădoiu – Romania against Switzerland (introduced in the 80th minute)
- Latest dismissal in a game without extra time: 89 minutes – Gustavo Quinteros – Bolivia against Germany
- Latest dismissal in a game with extra time: 101 minutes – Stefan Schwarz – Sweden against Romania
- Least time difference between two yellow cards given to the same player: 21 minutes – Fernando Clavijo – United States against Brazil (booked in the 64th minute and again in the 85th minute)
- Most yellow cards (team): 23 – Bulgaria
- Most red cards (team): 2 – Bolivia, Bulgaria, Italy, Sweden
- Fewest yellow cards (team): 5 – Cameroon
- Most yellow cards (player): 4 – Zlatko Yankov
- Most red cards (player): 1 – Fernando Clavijo, Luis Cristaldo, Marco Etcheverry, Luis García, Sergei Gorlukovich, Emil Kremenliev, Leonardo, Miguel Ángel Nadal, Gianluca Pagliuca, Stefan Schwarz, Rigobert Song, Jonas Thern, Tsanko Tsvetanov, Ion Vlădoiu, Gianfranco Zola
- Most yellow cards (match): 10 – Mexico vs Bulgaria
- Most red cards (match): 2 – Mexico vs Bulgaria
- Fewest yellow cards (match): 1 – Netherlands vs Republic of Ireland
- Most cards in one match: 10 yellow cards and 2 red cards – Mexico vs Bulgaria

== Marketing ==
=== Sponsorship ===
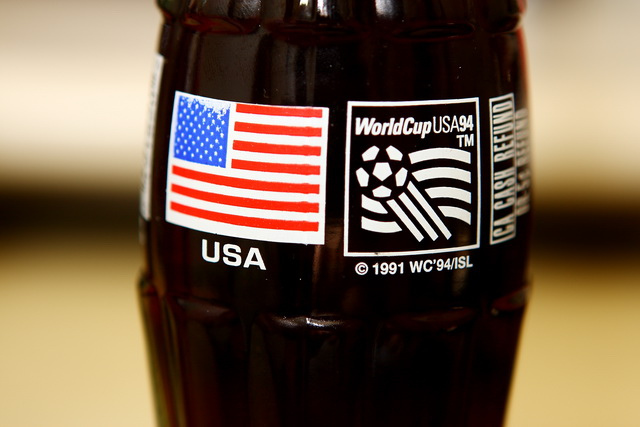
Coca-Cola was one of the sponsors of the 1994 FIFA World Cup

The sponsors of the 1994 FIFA World Cup were divided into two categories: FIFA World Cup Sponsors and USA Supporters. The former were major FIFA sponsors, while the latter joined for the 1994 tournament.

FIFA World Cup sponsors	US supporters
Adidas; Budweiser; Canon; Coca-Cola; Fujifilm; General Motors (Opel); Gillette; JVC; MasterCard; McDonald's; Philips; Snickers	American Airlines; Chevrolet; EDS; Energizer; GMC; ITT Inc.; Pontiac; Sheraton Hotels and Resorts; Sprint; Sun Microsystems; Upper Deck Company

== Symbols ==
=== Mascot ===
Striker, the official mascot of the tournament.

The official mascot of this World Cup was "Striker, the World Cup Pup", a dog wearing a red, white and blue soccer uniform with a ball. Striker was designed by the Warner Bros. animation team. A dog was picked as the mascot because dogs are a popular domestic pet in the United States.

=== Match ball ===
The official match ball was "Questra", manufactured by Adidas. Following the convention of the addition of decorations to the established Adidas Tango style since the Azteca and the Etrusco Unico, this one featured space-themed decorations, not only due to its name, but that 1994 marked the 25th anniversary of the Apollo 11 mission in which the first Moon landing took place, which is considered to be one of the most important moments in the history of the host country and the world.

=== Music ===
The official song was "Gloryland".

== Aftermath and legacy ==
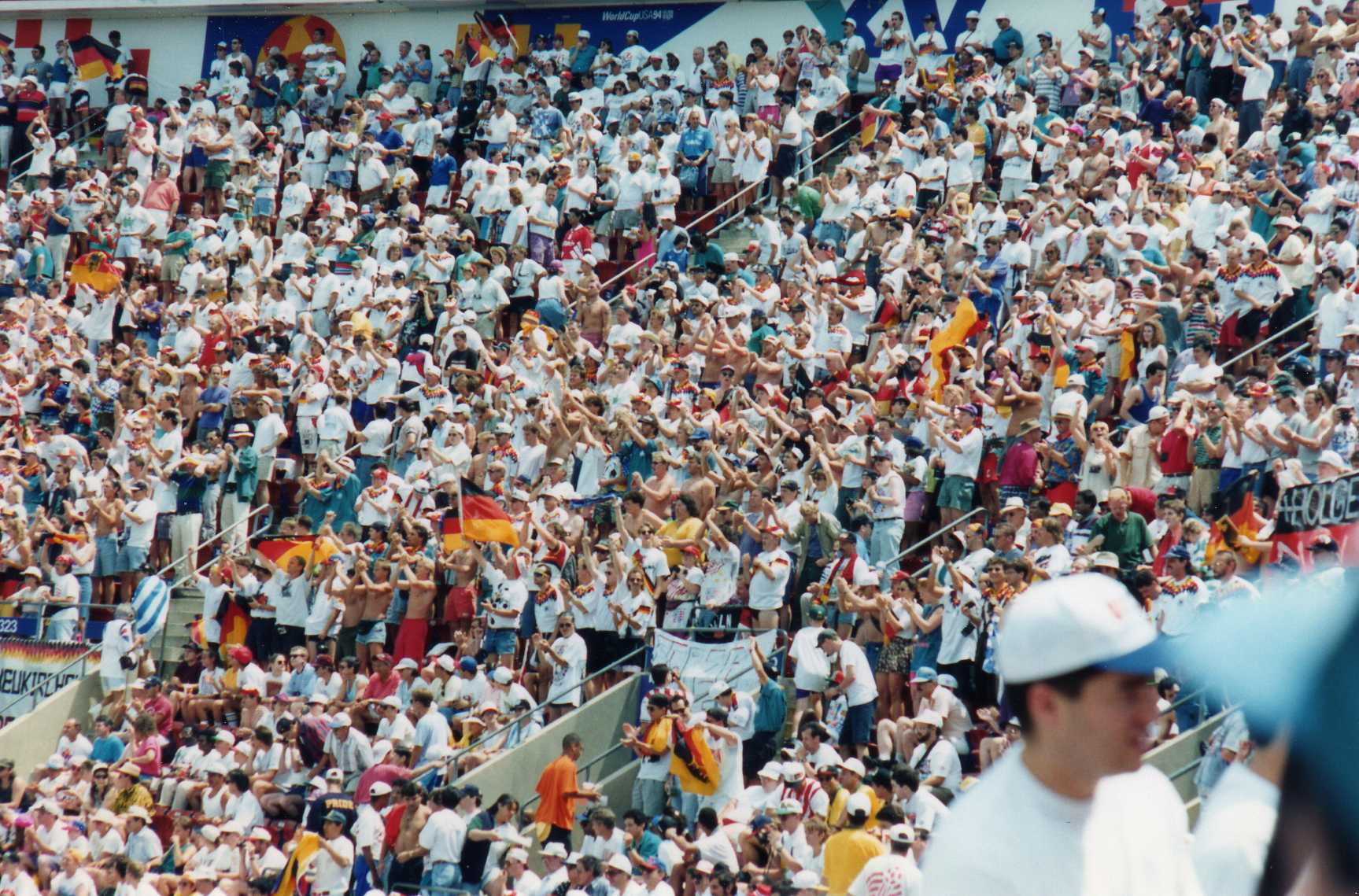
The large capacity stadiums enabled huge crowds to attend the games, such as this one at the Giants Stadium quarterfinal game.

- Although USA '94 marked the seventh time FIFA hosted the World Cup in the Americas (after being held in Uruguay, Brazil, Chile, Argentina, and twice by Mexico in 1970 and 1986), the United States became the first host in the Americas outside of the Latin American spectrum, and the first in the Anglosphere outside of England.
- The game between the United States and Switzerland at the Pontiac Silverdome on June 18 was the first to be played indoors in World Cup history: grass was grown by Michigan State University and was the first time since 1965 (the failed attempt at the Astrodome) that natural turf was used in an indoor stadium in the United States. To date, only Sapporo Dome in 2002 and Arena AufSchalke in 2006 have subsequently hosted indoor games in World Cup history.
- For the first time, the FIFA Anthem, composed by Franz Lambert, was played during the players' entrance onto the field.
- These finals were the first time FIFA decided to experiment with the styles of jerseys worn by officials, forgoing the traditional black. Officials could choose between burgundy, yellow, or silver shirts, depending on what was necessary to avoid clashes of colors between them and the two competing teams. This custom has since been followed, but black shirts were later added as another option.
- These finals were also the first time that players had their shirt numbers printed on the center front (or right or left breasts, in Morocco's and Russia's cases, respectively) of their shirts, as well as their names printed on the back of their jerseys in a World Cup, just as other American sports did, to make their identification easier for sportscasters. This custom followed from Euro 92, and has continued ever since (although the numbers being printed on the center front had been experimented with during the 1991 FIFA U-20 World Cup held in Portugal).
- These finals were the first to award 3 points for a win in the group stage to motivate teams to play an attacking style.
- In disciplinary matters, for the first time yellow cards accumulated in the group stage were wiped clean after its completion, and players started with a clean slate at the start of the knockout stage. Previously, players were suspended for one game if they accumulated two yellow cards at any point throughout the tournament. Now, players were suspended for one game after accumulating two yellow cards in the group stage, or two yellow cards in the knockout stage. This was in response to the situation in 1990, during which players such as Claudio Caniggia and Paul Gascoigne were suspended for the later games.
- The 1994 World Cup expanded television coverage of sports in the United States and worldwide through the sponsored scoreboard and game clock constantly shown on screen throughout the game. Being fully privately funded, television sports coverage in the United States had long relied upon commercial breaks, a feature suitable for sports such as baseball, basketball, ice hockey, and American football (which all have breaks in the action), but long considered incompatible with soccer, due to the long stretches of uninterrupted play. Led by Fox Sports, which debuted its NFL coverage about a month following the completion of the World Cup, virtually every television network included their version of the scoreboard clock by the decade's end.
- This was the last World Cup in which games other than the last two in each group were played simultaneously. However, this only happened once in this tournament: Saudi Arabia vs. Morocco and Belgium vs. Netherlands in Group F. From 1998 onwards, each game in the first two rounds of group play and the whole knockout stage have been played separately to maximize possible television audiences.
- This was the last World Cup featuring 24 nations, and up to the 2022 tournament, the last in which third-placed teams progressed to the round of 16. From 1998 to 2022, 32 nations competed, with only the top two in each group progressing. With 48 nations competing starting in 2026 onwards, the best eight third-placed teams across 12 groups advance to a round of 32.

=== Statistical records ===
- The 1994 World Cup final was the first (and to date only) goalless final in World Cup history. It was also the first to be decided by a penalty shootout, followed by the 2006 and 2022 finals.
- Oleg Salenko of Russia became the first player to score five goals in a single World Cup finals game in his country's group stage win over Cameroon. Cameroon's Roger Milla also scored a goal in the same game, becoming the oldest player to score a goal in a World Cup. At 42, he was also the oldest player to appear in a World Cup, a record held until 2014, when Faryd Mondragón (43 years, 3 days) of Colombia broke the record in their game against Japan at the 2014 FIFA World Cup. In turn, goalkeeper Essam El Hadary (45 years, 161 days) of Egypt would surpass Mondragón against Saudi Arabia, in the Volgograd Arena, Volgograd, Russia, on June 25, 2018. However, Milla remains the oldest outfield player to perform in the World Cup.
- Gianluca Pagliuca of Italy became the first goalkeeper to be sent off in a World Cup game, dismissed for handling outside his area against Norway.
- Brazil's eleven goals in their seven games was a record for the lowest average goals scored per game for any World Cup-winning side, but this record was broken by Spain's eight goals in 2010. The three goals Brazil conceded in those seven games were, at the time, also the lowest average goals conceded per game, although this was subsequently surpassed by France in 1998, Italy in 2006, and Spain in 2010 (all 2 in 7) before Spain lowered the record further in 2026 by conceding just 1 goal in 8 matches.

== See also ==
- Soccer in the United States
- FIFA
- 1999 FIFA Women's World Cup – a first Women's World Cup hosted by the United States
- 2003 FIFA Women's World Cup – a second Women's World Cup hosted by the United States
- Copa América Centenario – First edition of the Copa América hosted within the United States in 2016
- 2024 Copa América – Second edition of the Copa América hosted within the United States
- 2026 FIFA World Cup – a second World Cup hosted by the United States, co-hosted with Mexico and Canada.
- 2031 FIFA Women's World Cup – a third Women's World Cup hosted by the United States, co-hosted with Costa Rica, Jamaica, and Mexico.
