= Colombia national football team results (1980–1999) =

This page details the match results and statistics of the Colombia national football team from 1980 to 1999.

== Key ==
Key to matches

- Att.=Match attendance
- (H)=Home ground
- (A)=Away ground
- (N)=Neutral ground

Key to record by opponent

- Pld=Games played
- W=Games won
- D=Games drawn
- L=Games lost
- GF=Goals for
- GA=Goals against

== Results ==
Colombia's score is shown first in each case.

No.	Date	Venue	Opponents	Score	Competition	Colombia scorers	Att.	Ref.
122	9 July 1980	Estadio El Campín, Bogotá (H)	Poland	1–4	Friendly	Herrera	50,000	
123	1 February 1981	Estadio El Campín, Bogotá (H)	Brazil	1–1	Friendly	Vilarete	55,000	
124	10 March 1981	Estadio Nacional, Santiago (A)	Chile	0–1	Friendly		–	
125	15 March 1981	Estadio Defensores del Chaco, Asunción (A)	Paraguay	2–0	Friendly	Vilarete (2)	18,000	
126	19 March 1981	Estadio El Campín, Bogotá (H)	Chile	1–2	Friendly	Ortiz	45,000	
127	2 July 1981	Estadio El Campín, Bogotá (H)	Spain	1–1	Friendly	Herrera	25,000	
128	26 July 1981	Estadio El Campín, Bogotá (H)	Peru	1–1	1982 FIFA World Cup qualification	Herrera	60,000	
129	9 August 1981	Estadio Centenario, Montevideo (A)	Uruguay	2–3	1982 FIFA World Cup qualification	Sarmiento, Herrera	71,000	
130	16 August 1981	Estadio Nacional, Lima (A)	Peru	0–2	1982 FIFA World Cup qualification		45,000	
131	13 September 1981	Estadio El Campín, Bogotá (H)	Uruguay	1–1	1982 FIFA World Cup qualification	Herrera	10,000	
132	14 February 1983	Estadio El Campín, Bogotá (H)	Poland	1–0	Friendly	Sarmiento	–	
133	14 July 1983	Estadio El Campín, Bogotá (H)	Chile	2–2	Friendly	A. Valderrama (2)	20,000	
134	17 July 1983	Estadio El Campín, Bogotá (H)	Poland	1–1	Friendly	Díaz	20,000	
135	26 July 1983	Estadio Olímpico Atahualpa, Quito (A)	Ecuador	0–0	Friendly		35,000	
136	29 July 1983	Estadio El Campín, Bogotá (H)	Ecuador	0–0	Friendly		15,000	
137	14 August 1983	Estadio Hernando Siles, La Paz (A)	Bolivia	1–0	1983 Copa América	A. Valderrama	40,000	
138	17 August 1983	Estadio Nacional, Lima (A)	Peru	0–1	1983 Copa América		30,000	
139	28 August 1983	Estadio El Campín, Bogotá (H)	Peru	2–2	1983 Copa América	Prince, Fiorillo	50,000	
140	31 August 1983	Estadio El Campín, Bogotá (H)	Bolivia	2–2	1983 Copa América	A. Valderrama, Molina	45,000	
141	26 July 1984	Estadio El Campín, Bogotá (H)	Peru	1–1	Friendly	Knight	22,000	
142	9 August 1984	Estadio Nacional, Lima (A)	Peru	0–0	Friendly		16,000	
143	24 August 1984	Estadio El Campín, Bogotá (H)	Argentina	1–0	Friendly	Prince	35,000	
144	9 October 1984	Los Angeles Memorial Coliseum, Los Angeles (N)	Mexico	0–1	1984 Columbus Cup		–	
145	11 October 1984	Los Angeles Memorial Coliseum, Los Angeles (N)	United States	0–1	1984 Columbus Cup		–	
146	1 February 1985	Estadio El Campín, Bogotá (H)	Switzerland	2–2	Friendly	A. Valderrama, Sarmiento	20,000	
147	10 February 1985	Estadio El Campín, Bogotá (H)	Poland	1–2	Friendly	M. Córdoba	25,000	
148	14 February 1985	Estadio Olímpico Pascual Guerrero, Cali (H)	Poland	1–0	Friendly	Sarmiento	15,000	
149	21 February 1985	Estadio Nacional, Santiago (A)	Chile	1–1	Friendly	Vilarete	25,000	
150	24 February 1985	Estadio Centenario, Montevideo (A)	Uruguay	0–3	Friendly		53,000	
151	28 February 1985	Estadio Defensores del Chaco, Asunción (A)	Paraguay	3–0	Friendly	M. Córdoba, Iguarán, Vilarete	–	
152	17 April 1985	Estadio Hernán Ramírez Villegas, Pereira (H)	Paraguay	1–0	Friendly	Herrera	26,000	
153	19 April 1985	Estadio El Campín, Bogotá (H)	Paraguay	2–2	Friendly	Iguarán, Ortiz	10,000	
154	25 April 1985	Mineirão, Belo Horizonte (A)	Brazil	1–2	Friendly	Prince	49,898	
155	28 April 1985	Estadio El Campín, Bogotá (H)	Uruguay	2–1	Friendly	Ortiz, Iguarán	15,000	
156	15 May 1985	Estadio El Campín, Bogotá (H)	Brazil	1–0	Friendly	Lugo	25,000	
157	26 May 1985	Estadio El Campín, Bogotá (H)	Peru	1–0	1986 FIFA World Cup qualification	Prince	55,000	
158	2 June 1985	Estadio El Campín, Bogotá (H)	Argentina	1–3	1986 FIFA World Cup qualification	Prince	53,000	
159	9 June 1985	Estadio Nacional, Lima (A)	Peru	0–0	1986 FIFA World Cup qualification		45,000	
160	16 June 1985	Estadio Monumental, Buenos Aires (A)	Argentina	0–1	1986 FIFA World Cup qualification		26,000	
161	23 June 1985	Estadio Polideportivo de Pueblo Nuevo, San Cristóbal (A)	Venezuela	2–2	1986 FIFA World Cup qualification	Ortiz, Herrera	30,000	
162	30 June 1985	Estadio El Campín, Bogotá (H)	Venezuela	2–0	1986 FIFA World Cup qualification	M. Córdoba, Herrera	10,000	
163	27 October 1985	Estadio Defensores del Chaco, Asunción (A)	Paraguay	0–3	1986 FIFA World Cup qualification		60,000	
164	3 November 1985	Estadio Olímpico Pascual Guerrero, Cali (H)	Paraguay	2–1	1986 FIFA World Cup qualification	Angulo, Ortiz	10,000	
165	11 June 1987	Estadio Atanasio Girardot, Medellín (H)	Ecuador	1–0	Friendly	Álvarez	–	
166	14 June 1987	Estadio Modelo, Guayaquil (A)	Ecuador	0–3	Friendly		–	
167	1 July 1987	Estadio Gigante de Arroyito, Rosario (N)	Bolivia	2–0	1987 Copa América	C. Valderrama, Iguarán	5,000	
168	5 July 1987	Estadio Gigante de Arroyito, Rosario (N)	Paraguay	3–0	1987 Copa América	Iguarán (3)	10,000	
169	8 July 1987	Estadio Chateau Carreras, Córdoba (N)	Chile	1–2 (a.e.t.)	1987 Copa América	Redín	10,000	
170	11 July 1987	Estadio Monumental, Buenos Aires (N)	Argentina	2–1	1987 Copa América	Gómez, Galeano	15,000	
171	30 March 1988	Estadio Centenario, Armenia (H)	Canada	3–0	Friendly	Perea, C. Valderrama, Tréllez	30,000	
172	14 May 1988	Miami Orange Bowl, Miami (A)	United States	2–0	Friendly	Iguarán (2)	15,371	
173	17 May 1988	Hampden Park, Glasgow (A)	Scotland	0–0	Rous Cup		20,489	
174	19 May 1988	Helsinki Olympic Stadium, Helsinki (A)	Finland	3–1	Friendly	Arango, Higuita, Iguarán	5,548	
175	24 May 1988	Wembley Stadium, London (A)	England	1–1	Friendly	Escobar	25,756	
176	7 August 1988	Estadio El Campín, Bogotá (H)	Uruguay	2–1	Copa Gonzalo Jiménez de Quesada	Iguarán, Redín	18,497	
177	3 February 1989	Estadio Hernán Ramírez Villegas, Pereira (H)	Peru	1–0	Copa Centenario de Armenia	Higuita	16,200	
178	5 February 1989	Estadio Centenario, Armenia (H)	Chile	1–0	Copa Centenario de Armenia	Redín	10,367	
179	9 March 1989	Estadio Metropolitano, Barranquilla (H)	Argentina	1–0	Friendly	Iguarán	60,000	
180	24 June 1989	Miami Orange Bowl, Miami (A)	United States	1–0	Friendly	C. Valderrama	15,223	
181	27 June 1989	Miami Orange Bowl, Miami (N)	Haiti	4–0	Friendly	Tréllez, Iguarán, C. Valderrama, De Ávila	–	
182	3 July 1989	Estádio Fonte Nova, Salvador (N)	Venezuela	4–2	1989 Copa América	Higuita, Iguarán (2), De Ávila	4,000	
183	5 July 1989	Estádio Fonte Nova, Salvador (N)	Paraguay	0–1	1989 Copa América		1,500	
184	7 July 1989	Estádio Fonte Nova, Salvador (N)	Brazil	0–0	1989 Copa América		9,100	
185	9 July 1989	Estádio do Arruda, Recife (N)	Peru	1–1	1989 Copa América	Iguarán	60,000	
186	6 August 1989	Estadio Centenario, Montevideo (A)	Uruguay	0–0	Friendly		20,000	
187	20 August 1989	Estadio Metropolitano, Barranquilla (H)	Ecuador	2–0	1990 FIFA World Cup qualification	Iguarán (2)	70,000	
188	27 August 1989	Estadio Defensores del Chaco, Asunción (A)	Paraguay	1–2	1990 FIFA World Cup qualification	Iguarán	50,000	
189	3 September 1989	Estadio Modelo, Guayaquil (A)	Ecuador	0–0	1990 FIFA World Cup qualification		40,000	
190	17 September 1989	Estadio Metropolitano, Barranquilla (H)	Paraguay	2–1	1990 FIFA World Cup qualification	Iguarán, Hernández	60,000	
191	15 October 1989	Estadio Metropolitano, Barranquilla (H)	Israel	1–0	1990 FIFA World Cup qualification play-off	Usuriaga	50,000	
192	30 October 1989	Ramat Gan Stadium, Ramat Gan (A)	Israel	0–0	1990 FIFA World Cup qualification play-off		50,000	
193	2 February 1990	Miami Orange Bowl, Miami (N)	Uruguay	0–2	Marlboro Cup		25,292	
194	4 February 1990	Miami Orange Bowl, Miami (N)	United States	1–1 (9–8p)	Marlboro Cup	Fajardo	15,231	
195	20 February 1990	Los Angeles Memorial Coliseum, Los Angeles (N)	Soviet Union	0–0 (4–2p)	Marlboro Cup		18,132	
196	17 April 1990	Los Angeles Memorial Coliseum, Los Angeles (N)	Mexico	0–2	Friendly		30,385	
197	22 April 1990	Miami Orange Bowl, Miami (A)	United States	1–0	Friendly	Guerrero	8,214	
198	4 May 1990	Comiskey Park, Chicago (N)	Poland	2–1	Marlboro Cup	Estrada, Iguarán	2,912	
199	26 May 1990	Cairo International Stadium, Cairo (A)	Egypt	1–1	Friendly	Rincón	60,000	
200	2 June 1990	Nepstadion, Budapest (A)	Hungary	1–3	Friendly	Rincón	4,000	
201	9 June 1990	Stadio Renato Dall'Ara, Bologna (N)	United Arab Emirates	2–0	1990 FIFA World Cup	Redín, C. Valderrama	30,791	
202	14 June 1990	Stadio Renato Dall'Ara, Bologna (N)	Yugoslavia	0–1	1990 FIFA World Cup		32,257	
203	19 June 1990	San Siro, Milan (N)	West Germany	1–1	1990 FIFA World Cup	Rincón	72,510	
204	23 June 1990	Stadio San Paolo, Naples (N)	Cameroon	1–2 (a.e.t.)	1990 FIFA World Cup	Redín	50,026	
205	29 January 1991	Estadio León, León (A)	Mexico	0–0	Friendly		25,000	
206	3 February 1991	Miami Orange Bowl, Miami (N)	Switzerland	2–3	Miami Cup	De Ávila, Rincón	5,107	
207	5 June 1991	Råsunda Stadium, Solna (A)	Sweden	2–2	Friendly	Rincón, Iguarán	12,261	
208	25 June 1991	Nacional Stadium, San José (A)	Costa Rica	1–0	Friendly	De Ávila	5,000	
209	7 July 1991	Estadio Playa Ancha, Valparaíso (N)	Ecuador	1–0	1991 Copa América	De Ávila	15,000	
210	11 July 1991	Estadio Sausalito, Viña del Mar (N)	Bolivia	0–0	1991 Copa América		15,000	
211	13 July 1991	Estadio Sausalito, Viña del Mar (N)	Brazil	2–0	1991 Copa América	De Ávila, Iguarán	15,000	
212	15 July 1991	Estadio Sausalito, Viña del Mar (N)	Uruguay	0–1	1991 Copa América		30,000	
213	17 July 1991	Estadio Nacional, Santiago (N)	Chile	1–1	1991 Copa América	Iguarán	65,000	
214	19 July 1991	Estadio Nacional, Santiago (N)	Brazil	0–2	1991 Copa América		75,000	
215	21 July 1991	Estadio Nacional, Santiago (N)	Argentina	1–2	1991 Copa América	De Ávila	50,000	
216	7 July 1992	Estadio Nacional, Tegucigalpa (A)	Honduras	0–1	Friendly			
217	31 July 1992	Los Angeles Memorial Coliseum, Los Angeles (N)	United States	1–0	LA Friendship Cup	A. Valencia	26,651	
218	2 August 1992	Los Angeles Memorial Coliseum, Los Angeles (N)	Mexico	0–0	LA Friendship Cup		17,021	
219	24 February 1993	Estadio Polideportivo de Pueblo Nuevo, San Cristábal (A)	Venezuela	0–0	Friendly		10,000	
220	31 March 1993	Estadio Atanasio Girardot, Medellín (H)	Costa Rica	4–1	Friendly	A. Valencia (2), De Ávila, Pacheco	3,908	
221	8 May 1993	Miami Orange Bowl, Miami (N)	United States	2–1	Friendly	A. Valencia, García	17,652	
222	21 May 1993	Estadio El Campín, Bogotá (H)	Venezuela	1–1	Friendly	García	38,000	
223	30 May 1993	Estadio Nacional, Santiago (A)	Chile	1–1	Friendly	Aristizábal	5,000	
224	6 June 1993	Estadio El Campín, Bogotá (H)	Chile	1–0	Friendly	F. Asprilla	55,000	
225	16 June 1993	Estadio 9 de Mayo, Machala (N)	Mexico	2–1	1993 Copa América	A. Valencia, Aristizábal	20,000	
226	20 June 1993	Estadio 9 de Mayo, Machala (N)	Bolivia	1–1	1993 Copa América	Maturana	11,000	
227	23 June 1993	Estadio George Capwell, Guayaquil (N)	Argentina	1–1	1993 Copa América	Rincón	45,000	
228	26 June 1993	Estadio George Capwell, Guayaquil (N)	Uruguay	1–1 (5–3p)	1993 Copa América	Perea	10,000	
229	1 July 1993	Estadio George Capwell, Guayaquil (N)	Argentina	0–0 (5–6p)	1993 Copa América		15,000	
230	3 July 1993	Estadio Reales Tamarindos, Portoviejo (N)	Ecuador	1–0	1993 Copa América	A. Valencia	18,000	
231	1 August 1993	Estadio Metropolitano, Barranquilla (H)	Paraguay	0–0	1994 FIFA World Cup qualification		70,000	
232	8 August 1993	Estadio Nacional, Lima (A)	Peru	1–0	1994 FIFA World Cup qualification	Rincón	21,500	
233	15 August 1993	Estadio Metropolitano, Barranquilla (H)	Argentina	2–1	1994 FIFA World Cup qualification	Valenciano, A. Valencia	60,000	
234	22 August 1993	Estadio Defensores del Chaco, Asunción (A)	Paraguay	1–1	1994 FIFA World Cup qualification	Rincón	20,000	
235	29 August 1993	Estadio Metropolitano, Barranquilla (H)	Peru	4–0	1994 FIFA World Cup qualification	Valenciano, Rincón, Mendoza, W. Pérez	70,000	
236	5 September 1993	Estadio Monumental, Buenos Aires (A)	Argentina	5–0	1994 FIFA World Cup qualification	Rincón (2), F. Asprilla (2), A. Valencia	60,000	
237	28 January 1994	Estadio Agustín Tovar, Barinas (A)	Venezuela	2–1	Friendly	Tréllez, Valenciano	12,000	
238	6 February 1994	Prince Abdullah Al Faisal Stadium, Jeddah (A)	Saudi Arabia	1–1	Friendly	Valenciano	—	
239	9 February 1994	Prince Abdullah Al Faisal Stadium, Jeddah (A)	Saudi Arabia	1–0	Friendly	Valenciano	—	
240	18 February 1994	Joe Robbie Stadium, Miami Gardens (N)	Sweden	0–0	Joe Robbie Cup		15,676	
241	20 February 1994	Joe Robbie Stadium, Miami Gardens (N)	Bolivia	2–0	Joe Robbie Cup	M. Asprilla, W. Pérez	20,171	
242	26 February 1994	Weingart Stadium, Monterey Park (N)	South Korea	2–2	Friendly	Escobar, Aristizábal	12,000	
243	2 March 1994	Estadio Azteca, Mexico City (A)	Mexico	0–0	Friendly		110,000	
244	7 April 1994	Estadio Bello Horizonte, Villavicencio (H)	Bolivia	0–1	Friendly		16,000	
245	17 April 1994	Estadio Centenario, Armenia (H)	Nigeria	1–0	Friendly	De Ávila	28,000	
246	3 May 1994	Miami Orange Bowl, Miami (N)	Peru	1–0	Miami Cup	Lozano	10,000	
247	5 May 1994	Miami Orange Bowl, Miami (N)	El Salvador	3–0	Miami Cup	De Ávila, Lozano, Valenciano	8,000	
248	3 June 1994	Foxboro Stadium, Foxborough (N)	Northern Ireland	2–0	Friendly	W. Pérez, A. Valencia	4,000	
249	5 June 1994	Giants Stadium, East Rutherford (N)	Greece	2–0	Friendly	Gaviria, Rincón	73,511	
250	18 June 1994	Rose Bowl, Pasadena (N)	Romania	1–3	1994 FIFA World Cup	A. Valencia	91,856	
251	22 June 1994	Rose Bowl, Pasadena (N)	United States	1–2	1994 FIFA World Cup	A. Valencia	93,869	
252	26 June 1994	Stanford Stadium, Stanford (N)	Switzerland	2–0	1994 FIFA World Cup	Gaviria, Lozano	82,401	
253	31 January 1995	Hong Kong Stadium, Hong Kong (N)	South Korea	0–1	1995 Lunar New Year Cup		29,296	
254	8 February 1995	Lang Park, Brisbane (A)	Australia	0–0	Friendly		13,312	
255	11 February 1995	Sydney Football Stadium, Sydney (A)	Australia	1–0	Friendly	Ricard	15,269	
256	22 March 1995	Estadio Atanasio Girardot, Medellín (H)	Uruguay	2–1	Friendly	Cabrera, Bermúdez	20,000	
257	17 June 1995	Rutgers Stadium, Piscataway (N)	Nigeria	1–0	1995 US Cup	Gómez	15,216	
258	21 June 1995	Robert F. Kennedy Memorial Stadium, Washington, D.C. (N)	Mexico	0–0	1995 US Cup		20,432	
259	25 June 1995	Rutgers Stadium, Piscataway (N)	United States	0–0	1995 US Cup		36,126	
260	7 July 1995	Estadio Atilio Paiva Olivera, Rivera (N)	Peru	1–1	1995 Copa América	F. Asprilla	5,000	
261	10 July 1995	Estadio Atilio Paiva Olivera, Rivera (N)	Ecuador	1–0	1995 Copa América	Rincón	8,000	
262	13 July 1995	Estadio Atilio Paiva Olivera, Rivera (N)	Brazil	0–3	1995 Copa América		10,000	
263	16 July 1995	Estadio Centenario, Montevideo (N)	Paraguay	1–1 (5–4p)	1995 Copa América	Rincón	25,000	
264	19 July 1995	Estadio Centenario, Montevideo (N)	Uruguay	0–2	1995 Copa América		20,000	
265	22 July 1995	Estadio Campus Municipal, Maldonado (N)	United States	4–1	1995 Copa América	Quiñónez, C. Valderrama, F. Asprilla, Rincón	2,500	
266	6 September 1995	Wembley Stadium, London (A)	England	0–0	Friendly		20,038	
267	11 October 1995	Estadio Monumental, Buenos Aires (A)	Argentina	0–0	Friendly		6,000	
268	26 October 1995	Workers' Stadium, Beijing (A)	China	1–2	Friendly	Mendoza	60,000	
269	30 November 1995	Los Angeles Memorial Coliseum, Los Angeles (N)	Mexico	2–2	Friendly	Valenciano, MacKenzie	44,500	
270	20 December 1995	Vivaldão, Manaus (A)	Brazil	1–3	Friendly	Pareja	35,000	
271	6 March 1996	Miami Orange Bowl, Miami (N)	Honduras	2–1	Friendly	Valenciano (2)	15,123	
272	21 March 1996	Estadio Guillermo Plazas Alcid, Neiva (H)	Trinidad and Tobago	3–0	Friendly	Quiñónez (2), A. Valencia	10,000	
273	28 March 1996	Estadio Atanasio Girardot, Medellín (H)	Bolivia	4–1	Friendly	A. Valencia (2), Mendoza, F. Asprilla	26,000	
274	24 April 1996	Estadio Metropolitano, Barranquilla (H)	Paraguay	1–0	1998 FIFA World Cup qualification	F. Asprilla	31,600	
275	29 May 1996	Miami Orange Bowl, Miami (N)	Scotland	1–0	Friendly	F. Asprilla	12,000	
276	2 June 1996	Estadio Nacional, Lima (A)	Peru	1–1	1998 FIFA World Cup qualification	Aristizábal	43,345	
277	7 July 1996	Estadio Metropolitano, Barranquilla (H)	Uruguay	3–1	1998 FIFA World Cup qualification	F. Asprilla, C. Valderrama, De Ávila	36,169	
278	1 September 1996	Estadio Metropolitano, Barranquilla (H)	Chile	4–1	1998 FIFA World Cup qualification	F. Asprilla (3), Bermúdez	50,000	
279	9 October 1996	Estadio Olímpico Atahualpa, Quito (A)	Ecuador	1–0	1998 FIFA World Cup qualification	F. Asprilla	45,000	
280	1 November 1996	Shea Stadium, New York City (N)	Honduras	2–1	Friendly	Ramírez, Ángel	31,000	
281	10 November 1996	Estadio Hernando Siles, La Paz (A)	Bolivia	2–2	1998 FIFA World Cup qualification	Serna, Rincón	43,173	
282	23 November 1996	Suwon Sports Complex, Suwon (A)	South Korea	1–4	Friendly	Villa	8,275	
283	15 December 1996	Estadio Polideportivo de Pueblo Nuevo, San Cristóbal (A)	Venezuela	2–0	1998 FIFA World Cup qualification	Bermúdez, Valenciano	25,000	
284	8 February 1997	Estadio Hernán Ramírez Villegas, Pereira (H)	Slovakia	1–0	Friendly	F. Asprilla	17,000	
285	12 February 1997	Estadio Metropolitano, Barranquilla (H)	Argentina	0–1	1998 FIFA World Cup qualification		60,000	
286	2 April 1997	Estadio Defensores del Chaco, Asunción (A)	Paraguay	1–2	1998 FIFA World Cup qualification	Serna	37,297	
287	30 April 1997	Estadio Metropolitano, Barranquilla (H)	Peru	0–1	1998 FIFA World Cup qualification		30,000	
288	8 June 1997	Estadio Centenario, Montevideo (A)	Uruguay	1–1	1998 FIFA World Cup qualification	Ricard	37,500	
289	13 June 1997	Estadio Ramón Tahuichi Aguilera, Santa Cruz de la Sierra (N)	Mexico	1–2	1997 Copa América	Ricard	25,000	
290	16 June 1997	Estadio Ramón Tahuichi Aguilera, Santa Cruz de la Sierra (N)	Costa Rica	4–1	1997 Copa América	Morantes (2), Cabrera, Aristizábal	25,000	
291	19 June 1997	Estadio Ramón Tahuichi Aguilera, Santa Cruz de la Sierra (N)	Brazil	0–2	1997 Copa América		35,000	
292	21 June 1997	Estadio Hernando Siles, La Paz (N)	Bolivia	1–2	1997 Copa América	Gaviria	30,000	
293	5 July 1997	Estadio Nacional, Santiago (A)	Chile	1–4	1998 FIFA World Cup qualification	Ricard	75,617	
294	20 July 1997	Estadio Metropolitano, Barranquilla (H)	Ecuador	1–0	1998 FIFA World Cup qualification	De Ávila	30,000	
295	6 August 1997	Independence Park, Kingston (A)	Jamaica	0–1	Friendly		8,000	
296	20 August 1997	Estadio Metropolitano, Barranquilla (H)	Bolivia	3–0	1998 FIFA World Cup qualification	De Ávila, C. Valderrama, F. Asprilla	35,000	
297	24 August 1997	Estadio Nacional, Lima (A)	Peru	1–2	Friendly	Ramírez	15,000	
298	5 September 1997	Shea Stadium, New York City (N)	El Salvador	2–2	Friendly	R. Pérez, S. Valencia (o.g.)	—	
299	10 September 1997	Estadio Metropolitano, Barranquilla (H)	Venezuela	1–0	1998 FIFA World Cup qualification	Cabrera	35,000	
300	8 October 1997	Ullevaal Stadion, Oslo (A)	Norway	0–0	Friendly		18,028	
301	16 November 1997	Camilo Cichero Stadium, Buenos Aires (A)	Argentina	1–1	1998 FIFA World Cup qualification	C. Valderrama	40,000	
302	25 March 1998	Estadio El Campín, Bogotá (H)	Yugoslavia	0–0	Friendly		25,000	
303	29 March 1998	Yale Bowl, New Haven (N)	Paraguay	1–1	Friendly	Comas	25,000	
304	22 April 1998	Estadio Nacional, Santiago (A)	Chile	2–2	Friendly	Preciado (2)	30,000	
305	23 May 1998	Giants Stadium, East Rutherford (N)	Scotland	2–2	Friendly	C. Valderrama, Rincón	56,404	
306	30 May 1998	Waldstadion, Frankfurt (A)	Germany	1–3	Friendly	C. Valderrama	50,000	
307	3 June 1998	King Baudouin Stadium, Brussels (A)	Belgium	0–2	Friendly		10,000	
308	15 June 1998	Stade de Gerland, Lyon (N)	Romania	0–1	1998 FIFA World Cup		39,100	
309	22 June 1998	Stade de la Mosson, Montpellier (N)	Tunisia	1–0	1998 FIFA World Cup	Preciado	29,800	
310	26 June 1998	Stade Félix-Bollaert, Lens (N)	England	0–2	1998 FIFA World Cup		38,100	
311	9 February 1999	Miami Orange Bowl, Miami (N)	Germany	3–3	Friendly	F. Asprilla (2), I. Córdoba	—	
312	30 March 1999	Estadio José Pachencho Romero, Maracaibo (A)	Venezuela	0–0	Friendly		17,000	
313	15 April 1999	Olympic Stadium, Caracas (A)	Venezuela	1–1	Friendly	Morantes	22,000	
314	22 April 1999	Estadio Feliciano Cáceres, Luque (A)	Paraguay	2–0	Friendly	Congo, Morantes	20,000	
315	29 May 1999	Giants Stadium, East Rutherford (N)	El Salvador	1–2	Friendly	Hurtado	43,192	
316	17 June 1999	Estadio Palogrande, Manizales (H)	Peru	3–3	Friendly	F. Asprilla (2), Ballesteros	30,000	
317	24 June 1999	Estadio Defensores del Chaco, Asunción (A)	Paraguay	1–2	Friendly	Bonilla	20,000	
318	1 July 1999	Estadio General Pablo Rojas, Asunción (N)	Uruguay	1–0	1999 Copa América	Bonilla	3,000	
319	4 July 1999	Estadio Feliciano Cáceres, Luque (N)	Argentina	3–0	1999 Copa América	I. Córdoba, Congo, Montaño	18,000	
320	7 July 1999	Estadio Feliciano Cáceres, Luque (N)	Ecuador	2–1	1999 Copa América	Morantes, Ricard	20,000	
321	11 July 1999	Estadio Feliciano Cáceres, Luque (N)	Chile	2–3	1999 Copa América	Bolaño, Bonilla	3,000	
322	8 September 1999	Miami Orange Bowl, Miami (N)	Trinidad and Tobago	3–4	Friendly	Valenciano (3)	22,000	
323	13 October 1999	Estadio Chateau Carreras, Córdoba (A)	Argentina	1–2	Friendly	I. Córdoba	42,000	
324	20 October 1999	San Diego Stadium, San Diego (N)	Mexico	0–0	Friendly		24,500	
325	19 November 1999	Estadio El Campín, Bogotá (H)	Slovakia	1–0	Friendly	Varga (o.g.)	12,000	

== Record by opponent ==
Team	Pld	W	D	L	GF	GA	GD	WPCT
Argentina	15	6	4	5	19	13	+6	40.00
Australia	2	1	1	0	1	0	+1	50.00
Belgium	1	0	0	1	0	2	−2	0.00
Bolivia	11	5	4	2	18	9	+9	45.45
Brazil	9	2	2	5	6	13	−7	22.22
Cameroon	1	0	0	1	1	2	−1	0.00
Canada	1	1	0	0	3	0	+3	100.00
Chile	13	3	5	5	18	20	−2	23.08
China	1	0	0	1	1	2	−1	0.00
Costa Rica	3	3	0	0	9	2	+7	100.00
Ecuador	12	8	3	1	10	4	+6	66.67
El Salvador	3	1	1	1	6	4	+2	33.33
England	3	0	2	1	1	3	−2	0.00
Egypt	1	0	1	0	1	1	0	0.00
Finland	1	1	0	0	3	1	+2	100.00
Germany	2	0	1	1	4	6	−2	0.00
Greece	1	1	0	0	2	0	+2	100.00
Haiti	1	1	0	0	4	0	+4	100.00
Honduras	3	2	0	1	4	3	+1	66.67
Hungary	1	0	0	1	1	3	−2	0.00
Israel	2	1	1	0	1	0	+1	50.00
Jamaica	1	0	0	1	0	1	−1	0.00
Mexico	10	1	6	3	5	8	−3	10.00
Nigeria	2	2	0	0	2	0	+2	100.00
Northern Ireland	1	1	0	0	2	0	+2	100.00
Norway	1	0	1	0	0	0	0	0.00
Paraguay	18	8	5	5	24	17	+7	44.44
Peru	18	5	9	4	19	16	+3	27.78
Poland	6	3	1	2	7	8	−1	50.00
Romania	2	0	0	2	1	4	−3	0.00
Saudi Arabia	2	1	1	0	2	1	+1	50.00
Scotland	3	1	2	0	3	2	+1	33.33
Slovakia	2	2	0	0	2	0	+2	100.00
South Korea	3	0	1	2	3	7	−4	0.00
Soviet Union	1	0	1	0	0	0	0	0.00
Spain	1	0	1	0	1	1	0	0.00
Sweden	2	0	2	0	2	2	0	0.00
Switzerland	3	1	1	1	6	5	+1	33.33
Trinidad and Tobago	2	1	0	1	6	4	+2	50.00
Tunisia	1	1	0	0	1	0	+1	100.00
United Arab Emirates	1	1	0	0	2	0	+2	100.00
United States	10	6	2	2	13	6	+7	60.00
Uruguay	14	5	4	5	15	18	−3	35.71
Venezuela	10	5	5	0	15	7	+8	50.00
West Germany	1	0	1	0	1	1	0	0.00
Yugoslavia	2	0	1	1	0	1	−1	0.00
Total	204	80	69	55	245	197	+48	39.22

Source: Results
