= Colombia national football team results (unofficial matches) =

This is a list of the Colombia national football teams results from 1926 to the present day that, for various reasons, are not accorded the status of official International A Matches.

== 1946 ==
| 30 May Unofficial (Note: CVB 25th Anniversary Tournament.) | Surinam (Netherlands) | 1–1 | Colombia | Willemstad, Curaçao |
| | de Clerq 24' | Report | Carrillo 4' | Stadium: Rif Stadium |

| 2 June Unofficial | Curaçao | 1–0 | Colombia | Willemstad, Curaçao |
| | F. Jansen 25' | Report | | Stadium: Rif Stadium |

| 9 June Unofficial | SC Feijenoord (Netherlands) | 3–2 | Colombia | Willemstad, Curaçao |
| | Linssen 15'; Oldenburg (??) van Munster (??) | Report | Gavino (??); Blancaster (??) | Stadium: Rif Stadium |

| 15 June Unofficial | Aruba (Netherlands) | 1–2 | Colombia | Willemstad, Curaçao |
| | Laclé (??) | Report | Carrillo (??) | Stadium: Rif Stadium |

== 1968 ==
| 17 July Unofficial | Colombia | 2–4 | (Brazil) Santos | Bogotá, Colombia |
| | Arango 5'; G. González 17' | Report | Toninho Guerreiro 4', 51'; Pelé 23'; Pepe 66' | Stadium: Estadio El Campín; Attendance: 50,000; Referee: Guillermo Velásquez (Colombia) |

== 1970 ==
| 13 February Unofficial | Colombia | 0–1 | Czechoslovakia | Bogotá, Colombia |
| | | Report | Bičovský 80' | Stadium: Estadio El Campín |

| 20 May Unofficial (Note: Both games were played on the same day as a preparation of the English team for the 1970 FIFA World Cup in Mexico, with two hours of difference between them.) | Colombia B | 0–1 | England B | Bogotá, Colombia |
| | | Report | Astle 75' | Stadium: Estadio El Campín; Attendance: 36,000; Referee: C. Barrios (Venezuela) |

== 1972 ==
| 15 June Unofficial (Note: Brazil Independence Cup.) | Colombia | 4–3 | CONCACAF | Aracaju, Brazil |
| | Pineros 13'; Lugo 15', 17'; Morón 77' | Report | Reiner 38', 59'; Désir 64' | Stadium: Batistão; Attendance: 7,642; Referee: Rafael Hormazábal (Chile) |

| 25 June Unofficial | Africa Selection | 3–0 | Colombia | Salvador, Brazil |
| | Pokou 8'; Tokoto 39', 55' | Report | | Stadium: Estádio Fonte Nova; Attendance: 10,579; Referee: José Romei Cañete (Paraguay) |

== 1975 ==
| 26 September Unofficial (Note: Against the Brazil Olympic football team.) | Colombia | 2–1 | Brazil | Bogotá, Colombia |
| | Ortiz 57'; Lóndero 71' | Report | Cláudio Adão 6' | Stadium: Estadio El Campín; Referee: Mario Canessa (Chile) |

== 1980 ==
| 28 May Unofficial | Universidad Católica (Ecuador) | 0–2 | Colombia | Quito, Ecuador |
| | | | | Stadium: Estadio Olímpico Atahualpa |

| 12 June Unofficial | Colombia | 3–1 | Costa Rica | Pereira, Colombia |
| | | | | Stadium: Estadio Hernán Ramírez Villegas |

| 12 June Unofficial (Note: 1980 Copa Ciudad de Caracas.) | Colombia | 1–1 | (Spain) Real Madrid | Caracas, Venezuela |
| | Torres 6' | Report | Pineda 33' | Stadium: Estadio Olímpico |

| 13 June Unofficial | Colombia | 0–1 | (Portugal) Benfica | Caracas, Venezuela |
| | | Report | | Stadium: Estadio Olímpico |

| 19 June Unofficial | Costa Rica | 1–0 | Colombia | San José, Costa Rica |
| | | | | Stadium: Estadio Ricardo Saprissa Aymá |

| 20 June Unofficial | Colombia | 0–0 | (Spain) Real Madrid | San Cristóbal, Venezuela |
| | | Report | | Stadium: Estadio Polideportivo de Pueblo Nuevo |

| 25 June Unofficial | Barcelona (Ecuador) | 1–2 | Colombia | Guayaquil, Ecuador |
| | | | | Stadium: Estadio Modelo |

| 27 July Unofficial | Colombia | 5–0 | (England) Nottingham Forest | Bogotá, Colombia |
| | | | | Stadium: Estadio El Campín |

| 7 August Unofficial | Colombia | 1–0 | (Brazil) Cruzeiro | Bogotá, Colombia |
| | | | | Stadium: Estadio El Campín |

| 17 September Unofficial | America United (United States) | 0–1 | Colombia | New York City, USA |

| 12 October Unofficial | Colombia | 3–1 | (Argentina) Independiente | Cali, Colombia |
| | | | | Stadium: Estadio Olímpico Pascual Guerrero |

== 1981 ==
| 25 January Unofficial | Colombia | 1–0 | (Czechoslovakia) Spartak Trnava | Medellín, Colombia |
| | | | | Stadium: Estadio Atanasio Girardot |

| 20 May Unofficial | Colombia | 4–1 | (England) Birmingham City | Cali, Colombia |
| | | | | Stadium: Estadio Olímpico Pascual Guerrero |

| 28 May Unofficial | Colombia | 2–0 | (Spain) Valencia | Bogotá, Colombia |
| | | | | Stadium: Estadio El Campín |

| 11 June Unofficial | Colombia | 1–0 | (Brazil) Atlético Mineiro | Bogotá, Colombia |
| | | | | Stadium: Estadio El Campín |

| 23 June Unofficial | Atlético Mineiro (Brazil) | 6–1 | Colombia | Belo Horizonte, Brazil |
| | Éder 3'; Palhinha 10', 57'; Vaguinho 26'; Toninho Cerezo 36'; Marcus Vinicius 75' | Report | Herrera 73' | Stadium: Estádio Independência |

== 1988 ==
| 2 June Unofficial | Deportivo Cali (Colombia) | 3–1 | Colombia | Cali, Colombia |
| | Lezcano 9'; Olaechea 16'; Osma 82' | Report | Didí 43' | Stadium: Estadio Olímpico Pascual Guerrero; Referee: Gilberto Aristizábal (Colombia) |

| 2 August Unofficial (Note: Copa Gonzalo Jiménez de Quesada.) | Colombia | 2–0 | (Colombia) Santa Fe | Bogotá, Colombia |
| | Redín 43' (pen.); Didí 49' | Report | | Stadium: Estadio El Campín; Attendance: 14,687; Referee: Jesús Díaz (Colombia) |

| 4 August Unofficial | Millonarios (Colombia) | 1–0 | Colombia | Bogotá, Colombia |
| | J. Díaz 48' | Report | | Stadium: Estadio El Campín; Attendance: 11,254; Referee: José Fernando Palacio (Colombia) |

== 1989 ==
| 1 February Unofficial (Note: Copa Centenario de Armenia.) | Colombia | 3–1 | Colombia U-17 | Armenia, Colombia |
| | A. García 44' de Ávila 75'; R. Hernández 83' | Report | Osorio 52' | Stadium: Estadio Centenario; Attendance: 10,024; Referee: José Joaquín Torres (Colombia) |

| 13 August Unofficial | Colombia | 2–2 | (Colombia) América de Cali | Barranquilla, Colombia |
| | Iguarán (??); Higuita (??) | Report | Gruesso (??); Rincón (??) | Stadium: Estadio Metropolitano Roberto Meléndez |

== 1990 ==
| Unofficial | Colombia | 2–2 | (Colombia) América de Cali | Barranquilla, Colombia |
| | Perea (??) | Report | Maturana (??) | Stadium: Estadio Metropolitano Roberto Meléndez |

| 22 February Unofficial (Note: 1990 Los Angeles Marlboro Cup.) | Colombia | 1–0 | (Mexico) Guadalajara | Los Angeles, United States |
| | Mendoza 53' | | | Stadium: Los Angeles Memorial Coliseum |

| 6 May Unofficial (Note: 1990 Chicago Marlboro Cup.) | Club Atlas (Mexico) | 0–0 (4–1 p) | Colombia | Chicago, United States |
| | | | | Stadium: Comiskey Park |
| | Penalties |
| | García (penalty scored) (penalty scored) (penalty scored) (penalty scored) | | (penalty scored) Escobar; (penalty missed) Rincón; (penalty missed) Mendoza |

| 17 May Unofficial | Lech Poznań (Poland) | 1–1 | Colombia | Poznań, Poland |
| | Juskowiak 24' | Report | Rincón 41' |

| 30 May Unofficial | SS Casalecchio (Italy) | 1–5 | Colombia | Casalecchio di Reno, Italy |
| | Bucci (??) | Report | Higuita (??); R. Hernández (??); Redín (??); Guerrero (??) |

== 1991 ==
| 1 February Unofficial (Note: 1991 Miami Cup.) | Colombia | 0–0 | (Germany) Bayern Munich | Miami, United States |
| 21:30 EST | | Report | | Stadium: Miami Orange Bowl |

== 1993 ==
| 10 June Unofficial | France B | 1–3 | Colombia | Fort-de-France, Martinique |
| | Djorkaeff 46' | Report | Valencia 75', 84', 90' | Stadium: Stade d'Honneur de Dillon |

== 1994 ==
| February Unofficial | Colombia | 0–0 | (Italy) Fiorentina | Florence, Italy |
| | | Report | | Stadium: Stadio Artemio Franchi |

| 15 March Unofficial | Colombia | 1–0 | (Brazil) São Paulo | Bogotá, Colombia |
| | Aristizábal 12' | Report | | Stadium: Estadio El Campín |

| 1 May Unofficial | UNCAF Selection | 1–1 | Colombia | Panama City, Panama |
| | Cienfuegos 42' | Report | Valenciano 11' | Stadium: Estadio Rommel Fernández |

| 15 May Unofficial | Colombia | 2–0 | (Germany) Bayern Munich | Bogotá, Colombia |
| 20:00 (GMT) | Valenciano 19' de Ávila 65' | Report | | Stadium: Estadio El Campín |

| 22 May Unofficial | Colombia | 4–0 | (Germany) Eintracht Frankfurt | Medellín, Colombia |
| | Asprilla 1', 60'; Aristizábal 5'; Rincón 53' | Report | | Stadium: Estadio Atanasio Girardot |

| 29 May Unofficial (Note: Strikers Intercontinental Cup.) | Colombia | 2–1 | (Italy) Milan | Miami, United States |
| | Asprilla 26'; Rincón 32' | Report | Savićević 48' | Stadium: Orange Bowl; Attendance: 57,724 |

| 13 June Unofficial | Colombia | 3–0 | (Brazil) Palmeiras | Pereira, Colombia |
| | Rincón 15', 79'; Valencia 56' (pen.) | Report | | Stadium: Estadio Hernán Ramírez Villegas; Attendance: 32,000; Referee: Jorge Zuluaga (Colombia) |

== 1995 ==
| 4 February Unofficial (Note: 1995 Carlsberg Cup.) | Colombia | 3–1 | Hong Kong League XI | So Kon Po, Hong Kong |
| | Betancourt 5'; Pachecho 78'; Quiñónez 85' | Report | Tempest 72' | Stadium: Hong Kong Stadium; Attendance: 30,745 |

| 28 June Unofficial (Note: Brahama Cup.) | Boca Juniors (Argentina) | 1–1 | Colombia | Mendoza, Argentina |
| | Carranza 88' | Report | Rincón 71' | Stadium: Estadio Malvinas Argentinas; Referee: A. Sánchez |

| 1 July Unofficial | River Plate (Argentina) | 0–2 | Colombia | Mendoza, Argentina |
| | | Report | Asprilla 26'; Rincón 58' | Stadium: Estadio Malvinas Argentinas; Referee: Horacio Elizondo (Argentina) |

== 1997 ==
| 26 April Unofficial | Colombia | 2–0 | (Colombia) América de Cali | Cartagena, Colombia |
| | 10'; Lozano 26' | Report | | Stadium: Estadio Jaime Morón León; Attendance: 28,000 |

| 14 May Unofficial | MetroStars (United States) | 0–2 | Colombia | East Rutherford, USA |
| | | Report | Escobar 49'; Zuleta 78' | Stadium: Giants Stadium; Attendance: 21,505; Referee: Zim Boulous (USA) |

== 1999 ==
| 23 January Unofficial | Colombia | 1–1 | Denmark League XI | Cali, Colombia |
| | C. Asprilla 77' | Report | Fredgaard 11' | Stadium: Estadio Olímpico Pascual Guerrero; Attendance: 15,000; Referee: Fernando Panesso (Colombia) |

== 2001 ==
| 12 August Unofficial | Independiente Medellín (Colombia) | 1–1 | Colombia | Medellín, Colombia |
| | Serna (??) | Report | Orozco (??) | Stadium: Estadio Atanasio Girardot |

| 30 October Unofficial | Mexico | 2–3 | Colombia |
| | | Report |

== 2005 ==
| 28 December Unofficial | Valencian Community | 2–1 | Colombia | Valencia, Spain |
| | Navarro 9'; Juanfran 84' | Report | Castrillón 10' | Stadium: Mestalla Stadium; Attendance: 10,000; Referee: Ayza Gámez (Spain) |

== 2008 ==
| 29 December Unofficial | Catalonia | 2–1 | Colombia | Barcelona, Spain |
| | Krkić 15'; Verdú 62' | Report | Montero 90+2' | Stadium: Camp Nou; Attendance: 30,000; Referee: Alberto Undiano Mallenco (Spain) |

== 2011 ==
| 22 June Unofficial (Note: Against the Mexico Olympic football team.) | Colombia | 0–0 | Mexico U23 | Pereira, Colombia |
| | | Report | | Stadium: Estadio Hernán Ramírez Villegas |

| 25 June Unofficial (Note: Against the Senegal Olympic football team.) | Colombia | 2–0 | Senegal U23 | Medellín, Colombia |
| | Aguilar 16'; Martínez 41' | Report | | Stadium: Estadio Atanasio Girardot; Attendance: 12,000; Referee: Diego Lara (Ecuador) |

== 2012 ==
| 28 May Unofficial | Colombia | 7–1 | Guyana | Bogotá, Colombia |
| | Guarín (??); J. Martínez (??); Muriel (??); J. Rodríguez (??) (??) | Report | Abrams (??) | Stadium: Estadio El Campín |

== 2014 ==
| 23 May Unofficial (Note: 30-minute exhibition match.) | Colombia A | 1–1 | Colombia B | Bogotá, Colombia |
| | Yepes (??) | Report | Bacca (??) | Stadium: Estadio El Campín; Attendance: 30,000; Referee: Wilmar Roldán (Colombia) |

== 2018 ==
| 25 May Unofficial (Note: 30-minute exhibition match.) | Colombia A | 1–1 | Colombia B | Bogotá, Colombia |
| | Muriel (??) | Report | Bacca (??) | Stadium: Estadio El Campín |
