= 1997 Reebok Cup =

Football tournament in 1997

The first-ever Reebok Cup, an international football tournament featuring four of the world's most powerful club teams, was held in the United States at the Orange Bowl in Miami and Soldier Field in Chicago on July 25 and 27, 1997, respectively. It was formally announced on May 1, 1997, by Reebok International Ltd.

The inaugural Reebok Cup, endorsed by FIFA and the U.S. Soccer Federation, showcased clubs from Brazil, Germany, Mexico and Colombia. Representing Europe was the then five-time Bundesliga champion and two-time UEFA Cup winners Borussia Mönchengladbach. The American continent was represented by SE Palmeiras of Brazil, 1996 Brazilian Cup vice-champions; Necaxa of Mexico, winners of the 1995 Liga MX championship; and Club Atletico Junior, from Barranquilla the 1993 and 1995 Colombian League Champions.

The tournament format consisted of doubleheaders at each venue with the opening match in Miami featuring Necaxa, led by Mexico national team captain Alberto García Aspe, national team forward Luis Hernández and Ecuador's national team striker Álex Aguinaga against the Mönchengladbach side that included star midfielder Stefan Effenberg and Sweden national team striker Martin Dahlin, who led his country to the semi-finals of World Cup USA '94. In the "South American Showdown", Brazil national team defender Cafu, and Freddy Rincón, starting midfielder for Colombia's 1990 and 1994 World Cup teams, led Palmeiras against Club Atletico Junior, one of the oldest clubs in the Colombian first division that featured the then-rising star forward Miguel Asprilla and former Colombia national team goalkeeper José María Pazo.

The opening match of the doubleheader in Chicago decided third-place in the tournament. The winners of the Orange Bowl doubleheader competed in the championship match to determine the inaugural Reebok Cup champions.

The Reebok Cup was intended to become an annual tournament staged worldwide featuring international club teams including Reebok sponsored.

== Participants ==
Atlético Junior (Colombia)
Borussia Mönchengladbach (Germany)
Necaxa (Mexico)
SE Palmeiras (Brazil)

== Matches ==
=== Semifinals ===
Borussia 2-1 Necaxa
Goals: Petterson, Juskowiak; Blanco

Junior 2-2 Palmeiras (Junior on penalties)
Goals: Clavis, Vilarete; Euller, Alex

=== Third-place match ===
Necaxa 4-1 Palmeiras
Goals: Montes de Oca, Aguinaga, Blanco (2); Zinho

=== Final ===
Junior 2-0 Borussia
Goals: Méndez, Sacramento

Most Valuable Player: Cuauthemoc Blanco (Necaxa)

== Champion ==
The champion of the 1997 edition of the Reebok Cup was Atlético Junior, from Barranquilla, Colombia.
