= Eduardo Vilarete =

Colombian footballer (1953–2026)

Personal information
- Full name: Eduardo Emilio Vilarete Fernández
- Date of birth: 20 June 1953
- Place of birth: Santa Marta, Colombia
- Date of death: 9 October 2026 (aged 73)
- Place of death: Bogotá, Colombia
- Position: Forward

Senior career*
Years	Team	Apps	(Gls)
1974–1975	Atlético Bucaramanga		
1976	Unión Magdalena	28	(6)
1976	Atlético Nacional	23	(8)
1977–1978	Atlético Bucaramanga		
1979–1981	Atlético Nacional		
1982	Deportivo Pereira	32	(14)
1983	Deportes Tolima	14	(2)
1984–1985	Unión Magdalena		
1985	S.D. Quito		
1986	L.D.U. Quito		
1987	Deportes Tolima	22	(5)
1988	Audaz Octubrino		
1989	Atlético Bucaramanga	4	(1)

International career
1976–1985	Colombia	21	(7)
- * Club domestic league appearances and goals

Eduardo Emilio Vilarete Fernández (20 June 1953 – 9 October 2026) was a Colombian footballer who played as a forward. He made 21 appearances for the Colombia national team from 1976 to 1985, scoring 7 goals. He was also part of Colombia's squad for the 1979 Copa América tournament.

Vilarete was born on June 20, 1953, in the El Ancón neighborhood of Santa Marta. He began in the Millonarios youth ranks but did not make it to the first team; his professional football career started at Atlético Bucaramanga, a first-division club, where he made his debut in 1974 at the age of 21. In 1975, he was the team's top scorer with 18 goals the only Colombian to achieve that scoring rate standing out alongside teammates such as Misael Flórez and Alfredo Arango.

In 1976, he was originally set to sign with Junior, but due to administrative issues, he ended up playing for Unión Magdalena; however, he only played the opening tournament there. For the closing tournament, he signed with Atlético Nacional, where to the surprise of many he emerged as a standout player, helping the team win the championship and a serving as a key figure in the squad. The following year, he returned to Bucaramanga, delivering impressive performances until 1978 before being signed again by Atlético Nacional in 1979. During the 1980 championship, he scored 24 goals in 43 appearances the highest single season tally of his career. A year later, he won a title with the Verdolaga team, and the following year, he secured a second national championship with them, cementing his place among the club's top 20 all-time goalscorers. In 1982, Atlético Nacional sold Vilarete to Deportivo Pereira for the substantial sum of 13 million Colombian pesos; he played the 1982 championship with Pereira, finishing with 14 goals in 32 appearances.

He was then acquired by Deportes Tolima and later returned to Unión Magdalena, where he performed well, remaining with them until early 1985. That year he had his first experience in a foreign league. In fact, he was acquired by Deportivo Quito, where his performance was positive; at the end of the season he scored 18 goals, which gave him 4th place in the top scorer's table. In 1986 he played for Liga de Quito, and in 1987 he returned to his homeland, signing again with Deportes Tolima.

Vilarete returned to Ecuador, where he played for Club Social y Deportivo Audaz Octubrino for a year. For the third time, he returned to the club where it all began, but his goal average was no longer the same, registering 1 goal in 4 games, his lowest goal average. After failing to find a team, he decided to move to Peruvian football to play for Deportivo Pacífico, where he won the regional championship of the northern zone, qualifying for the octagonal final. However, his team did not appear due to a walkout in favor of Sport Boys. In 1990, he retired from professional football at the age of 37.

He represented the Colombian national football team on several occasions. He played in the 1976 Pre-Olympic Tournament where he scored 4 goals. He was called up for the qualifiers for the 1978 World Cup in Argentina. Unfortunately. Colombia finished last in Group 1 during the first phase without securing a single victory managing only 2 draws and 2 losses with Vilarete scoring the team's only goal against Paraguay. In the final matchday, Colombia suffered a crushing 6-0 defeat against Brazil the worst in the national team's qualifying history a game Vilarete would remember for the moment an opponent sat on the ball in the middle of play after scoring the fourth goal. A year later, he was selected for the 1979 Copa América, though he served as a substitute throughout the tournament. He was called up again for the qualifiers for the 1982 World Cup in Spain, where Colombia once more finished last with 2 points; his final appearance for the national team came in a friendly against Poland on February 12, 1985 a match Colombia won 1-0, with Vilarete playing the full game.

Vilarete died from cancer in Bogotá, on 9 October 2026, at the age of 73.
