= Carepa =

- Municipality and town
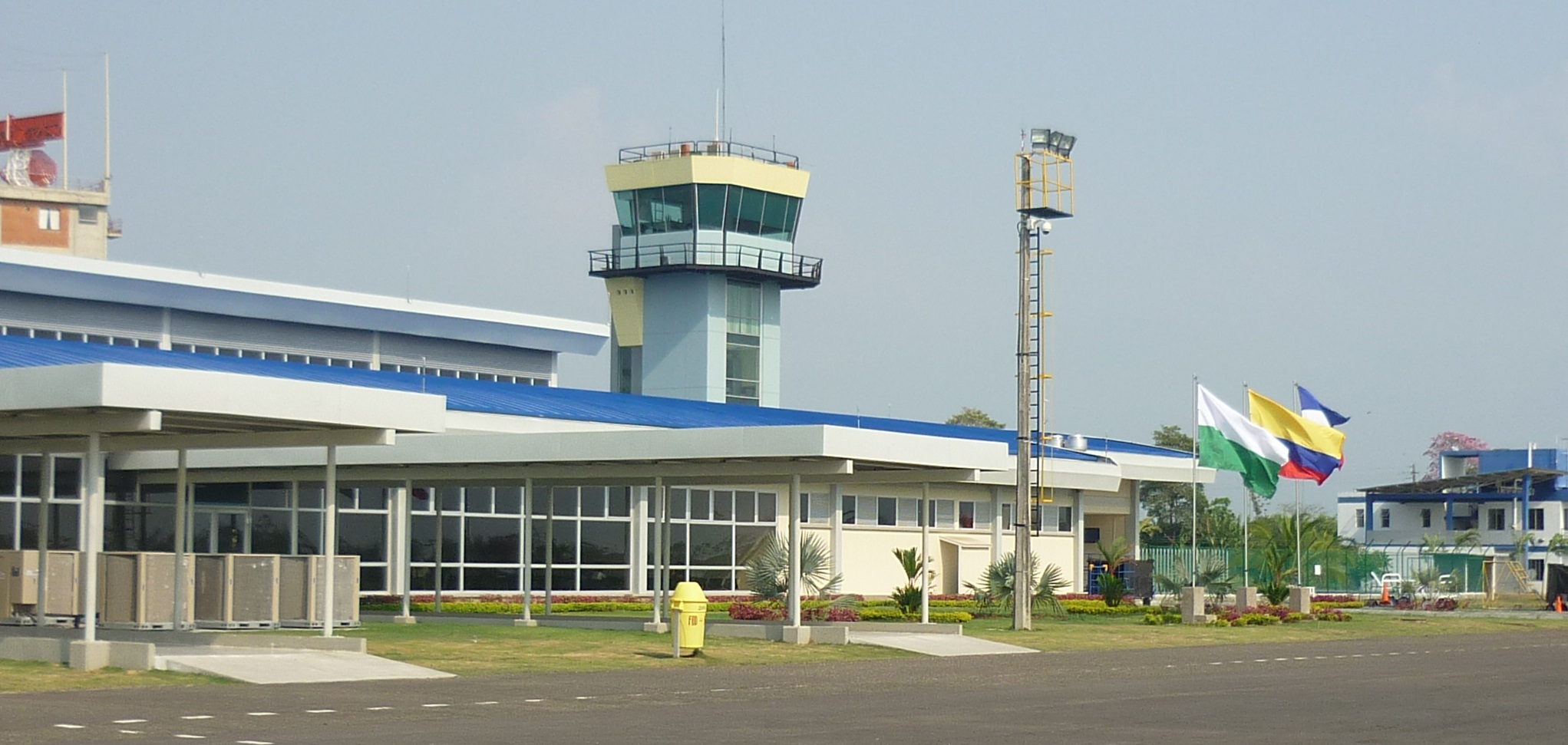
- Municipal airport

- Flag Coat of arms

- Location of the municipality and town of Carepa in the Antioquia Department of Colombia

- Location in Colombia
- Coordinates: 7°45′28″N 76°39′19″W
- Country: Colombia
- Department: Antioquia Department
- Subregion: Urabá

Area
  - Municipality and town: 387.3 km^{2} (149.5 sq mi)
  - Urban: 2.6 km^{2} (1.0 sq mi)

Population (2018 census)
  - Municipality and town: 47,932
  - Density: 123.8/km^{2} (320.5/sq mi)
  - Urban: 33,009
  - Urban density: 13,000/km^{2} (33,000/sq mi)
- Time zone: UTC-5 (Colombia Standard Time)

Carepa is a town and municipality in Antioquia Department, Colombia. Carepa is part of the Urabá Antioquia sub-region.

== Climate ==
Carepa has a tropical rainforest climate (Af) with heavy to very heavy rainfall year-round.

Climate data for Carepa (Tulenapa), elevation 30 m (98 ft), (1981–2010)
Month	Jan	Feb	Mar	Apr	May	Jun	Jul	Aug	Sep	Oct	Nov	Dec	Year
Mean daily maximum °C (°F)	30.7 (87.3)	30.7 (87.3)	31.0 (87.8)	31.2 (88.2)	31.3 (88.3)	31.3 (88.3)	31.3 (88.3)	31.4 (88.5)	31.3 (88.3)	31.1 (88.0)	30.9 (87.6)	30.8 (87.4)	31.1 (88.0)
Daily mean °C (°F)	26.7 (80.1)	26.8 (80.2)	27.0 (80.6)	27.2 (81.0)	27.0 (80.6)	26.9 (80.4)	26.7 (80.1)	26.8 (80.2)	26.7 (80.1)	26.6 (79.9)	26.5 (79.7)	26.6 (79.9)	26.8 (80.2)
Mean daily minimum °C (°F)	23.3 (73.9)	23.3 (73.9)	23.5 (74.3)	23.9 (75.0)	23.8 (74.8)	23.4 (74.1)	23.2 (73.8)	23.5 (74.3)	23.3 (73.9)	23.3 (73.9)	23.2 (73.8)	23.2 (73.8)	23.4 (74.1)
Average precipitation mm (inches)	92.7 (3.65)	76.5 (3.01)	98.8 (3.89)	248.1 (9.77)	320.9 (12.63)	316.3 (12.45)	284.0 (11.18)	277.5 (10.93)	319.2 (12.57)	319.7 (12.59)	307.1 (12.09)	214.0 (8.43)	2,872 (113.1)
Average precipitation days (≥ 1.0 mm)	9	7	10	16	21	22	21	22	21	21	19	14	197
Average relative humidity (%)	85	85	84	86	88	89	88	88	87	87	88	88	87
Mean monthly sunshine hours	182.9	152.4	136.4	120.0	130.2	126.0	148.8	148.8	135.0	151.9	150.0	161.2	1,743.6
Mean daily sunshine hours	5.9	5.4	4.4	4.0	4.2	4.2	4.8	4.8	4.5	4.9	5.0	5.2	4.8
Source: Instituto de Hidrologia Meteorologia y Estudios Ambientales

Climate data for Carepa (Antonio Roldán Betancur Airport), elevation 19 m (62 ft), (1981–2010)
Month	Jan	Feb	Mar	Apr	May	Jun	Jul	Aug	Sep	Oct	Nov	Dec	Year
Mean daily maximum °C (°F)	30.6 (87.1)	30.6 (87.1)	30.8 (87.4)	31.1 (88.0)	31.5 (88.7)	31.5 (88.7)	31.5 (88.7)	31.7 (89.1)	31.7 (89.1)	31.5 (88.7)	31.2 (88.2)	30.9 (87.6)	31.2 (88.2)
Daily mean °C (°F)	27.1 (80.8)	27.1 (80.8)	27.3 (81.1)	27.5 (81.5)	27.5 (81.5)	27.5 (81.5)	27.5 (81.5)	27.5 (81.5)	27.3 (81.1)	27.2 (81.0)	27.1 (80.8)	27.1 (80.8)	27.3 (81.1)
Mean daily minimum °C (°F)	23.4 (74.1)	23.6 (74.5)	23.7 (74.7)	23.9 (75.0)	23.6 (74.5)	23.4 (74.1)	23.1 (73.6)	23.1 (73.6)	22.9 (73.2)	23.0 (73.4)	22.9 (73.2)	23.3 (73.9)	23.3 (73.9)
Average precipitation mm (inches)	110.8 (4.36)	99.7 (3.93)	156.1 (6.15)	285.3 (11.23)	379.4 (14.94)	342.7 (13.49)	348.0 (13.70)	291.2 (11.46)	330.0 (12.99)	347.7 (13.69)	332.3 (13.08)	250.2 (9.85)	3,273.4 (128.87)
Average precipitation days (≥ 1.0 mm)	10	10	13	19	23	23	23	23	22	22	19	16	222
Average relative humidity (%)	82	82	82	83	84	84	83	83	83	83	84	83	83
Mean monthly sunshine hours	179.8	152.4	142.6	126.0	120.9	114.0	130.2	136.4	129.0	145.7	141.0	145.7	1,663.7
Mean daily sunshine hours	5.8	5.4	4.6	4.2	3.9	3.8	4.2	4.4	4.3	4.7	4.7	4.7	4.6
Source: Instituto de Hidrologia Meteorologia y Estudios Ambientales

== Notable people ==
- Lina Flórez (1984-), athlete
- Hermán Gaviria (1969-2002), Football player
- Andrés Mosquera Marmolejo, football player
