= Gabriel Martínez (footballer) =

Colombian footballer (born 1958)

Personal information
- Full name: Gabriel de Jesús Martínez Miranda
- Date of birth: 3 July 1958 (age 68)
- Place of birth: Barrancabermeja, Colombia
- Height: 1.82 m (6 ft 0 in)
- Position: Left-back

International career
Years	Team	Apps	(Gls)
1991	Colombia	1	(0)

Gabriel de Jesús Martínez Miranda (born 3 July 1958) is a Colombian former footballer who played as a left-back. He made one appearance for the Colombia national team in 1991. He was also part of Colombia's squad for the 1991 Copa América tournament.

Sporting positions
Preceded by Alexis Mendoza	Atlético Junior captain 1990–1992	Succeeded by Carlos Valderrama
