= Andrés Mosquera (footballer, born 1991) =

Colombian professional footballer

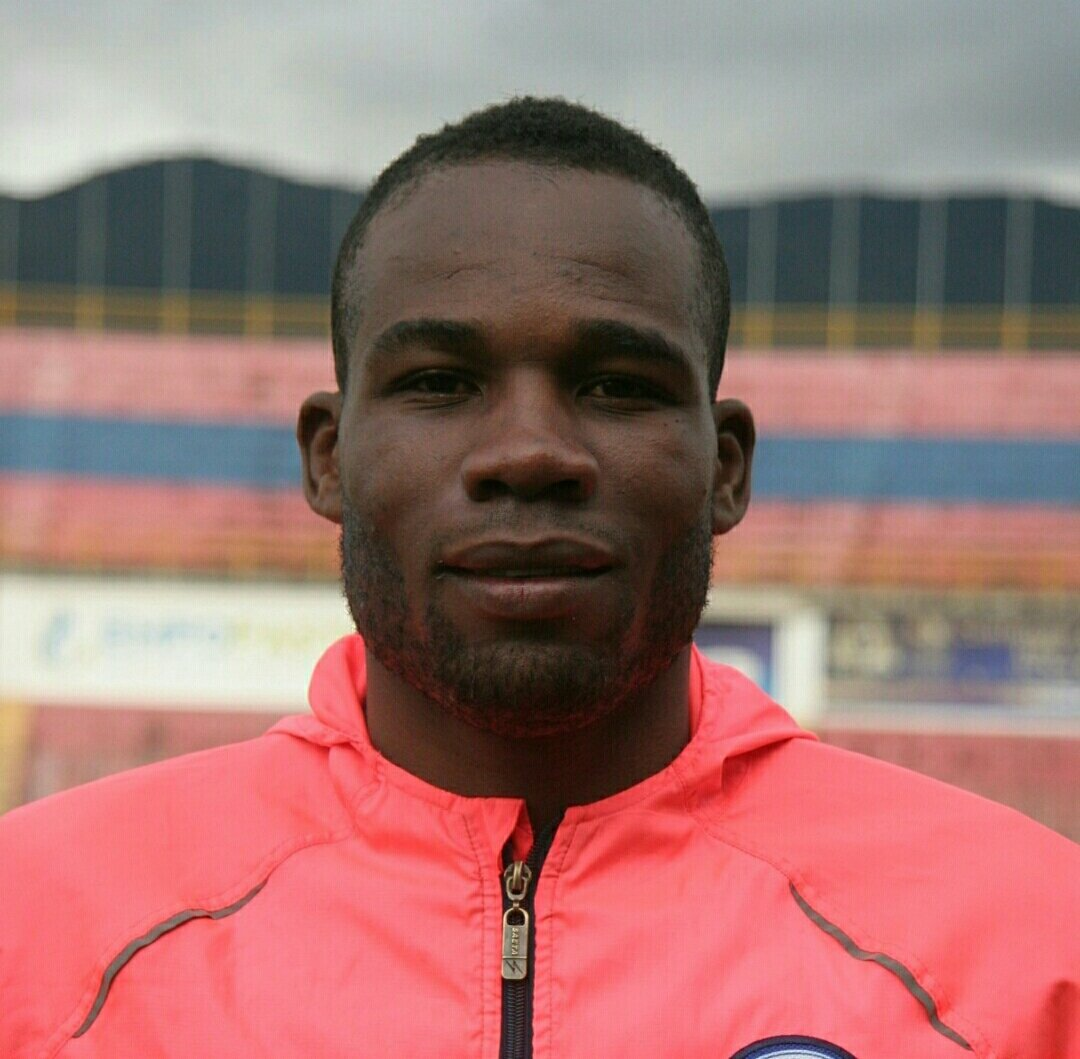
- Mosquera in 2017

Personal information
- Full name: Andrés Felipe Mosquera Marmolejo
- Date of birth: 10 September 1991 (age 35)
- Place of birth: Carepa, Colombia
- Height: 1.86 m (6 ft 1 in)
- Position: Goalkeeper

Team information
- Current team: Independiente Santa Fe
- Number: 1

Youth career
- 2007–2011: Bogotá F.C.

Senior career*
Years	Team	Apps	(Gls)
2011–2014	Bogotá F.C.	16	(0)
2012–2013	→América de Cali (loan)	31	(0)
2013	→Cortuluá (loan)	10	(0)
2013–2014	→Fortaleza C.E.I.F. (loan)	42	(0)
2014–2016	Atlético Bucaramanga	24	(0)
2017–2018	Deportivo Pasto	38	(0)
2018–2023	Independiente Medellín	115	(0)
2024–	Independiente Santa Fe	95	(0)

International career^{‡}
2009–2011	Colombia U20	13	(0)
2022–	Colombia	1	(0)
- * Club domestic league appearances and goals as of 22 January 2025 ‡ National team caps and goals as of 22 January 2025

Andrés Felipe Mosquera Marmolejo (born 10 September 1991) is a Colombian professional footballer who plays as a goalkeeper for Categoría Primera A club Independiente Santa Fe, and the Colombia national team.

== Club career ==
Mosquera began his senior career with his youth club Bogotá F.C., and promptly went on loan with América de Cali, Cortuluá, and Fortaleza C.E.I.F. He made his professional debut with Fortaleza C.E.I.F. in a 3–1 Categoría Primera A loss to Once Caldas on 25 January 2014. He then signed with Atlético Bucaramanga, before a stint at Deportivo Pasto in 2017. On 1 January 2018, he transferred to Independiente Medellín, helping them win 2 consecutive Copa Colombias. independiente Santa Fe

== International career ==
Mosquera represented the Colombia U20s, having won the 2011. He debuted with the senior Colombia national team in a friendly 2–1 win over Honduras on 16 January 2022.

== Personal life ==
Mosquera's brother, Carlos Mosquera, is also a professional footballer who plays as a goalkeeper in Colombia.

== Honours ==
Atlético Bucaramanga

- Categoría Primera B: 2015

Independiente Medellín

- Copa Colombia: 2019, 2020

Colombia U20

- Toulon Tournament: 2011
