= Nelson Silva Pacheco =

Colombian footballer (1944–2025)

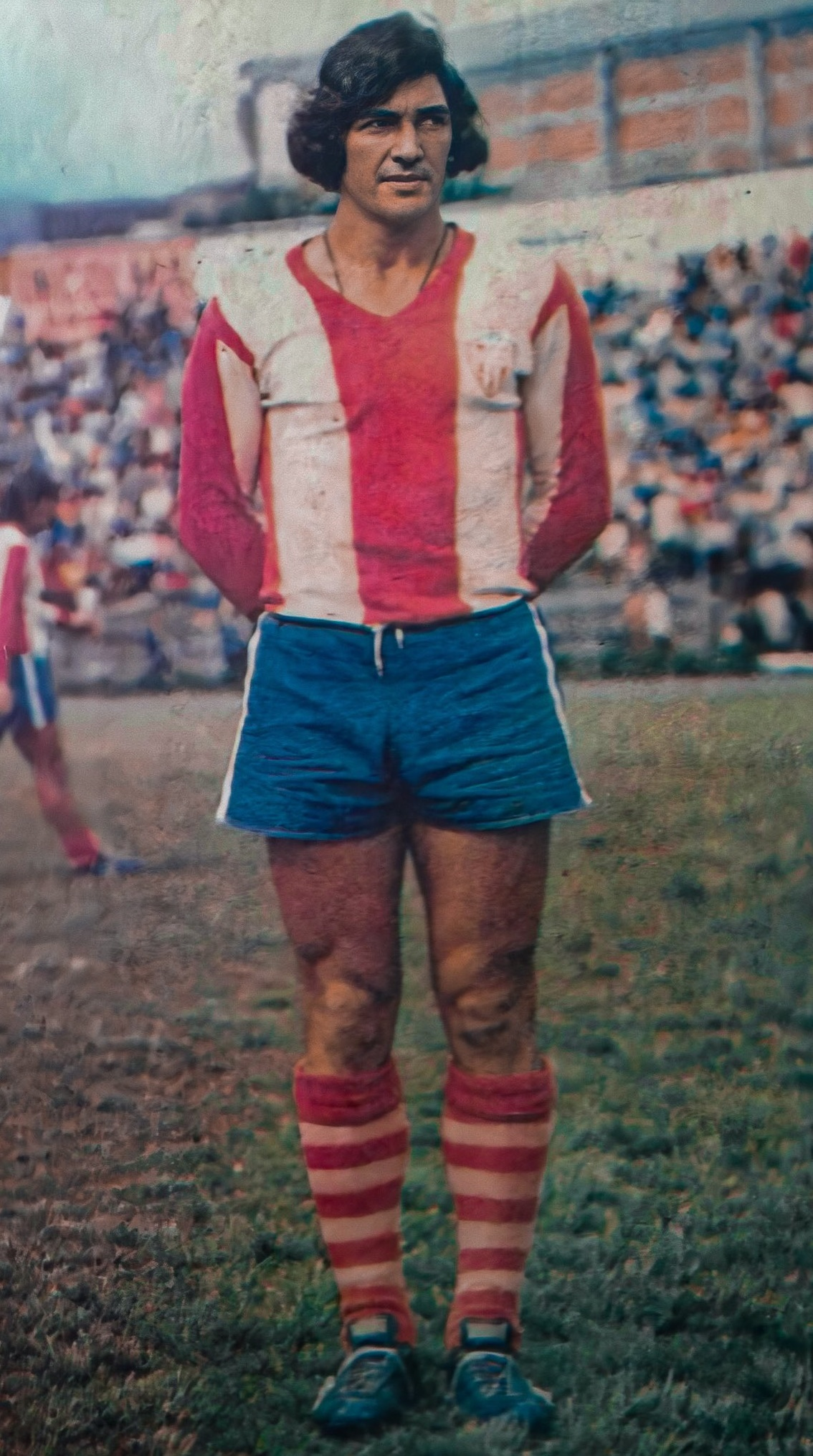
- Silva Pacheco in 1973

Personal information
- Full name: Alfonso Nelson Silva Pacheco
- Date of birth: 8 October 1944
- Place of birth: Las Piedras, Uruguay
- Date of death: 10 January 2025 (aged 80)
- Place of death: Barranquilla, Colombia
- Position: Forward

Senior career*
Years	Team	Apps	(Gls)
1962–1965	Danubio		
1966	Liverpool		
1966–1967	Sportivo Italiano	47	(5)
1968	Tigre	33	(4)
1969	Rosario Central	7	(1)
1970	Atlético Nacional	36	
1971	Deportes Quindio		
1972	Cúcuta Deportivo		
1973	Deportes Quindio		
1973–1976	Atlético Junior		
1977	Cúcuta Deportivo		
1977	Deportes Quindio		
1978	Deportivo Táchira		
1978	Atlético Junior		
1979–1980	América de Cali		

International career
1975	Colombia	3	(0)
- * Club domestic league appearances and goals

Alfonso Nelson Silva Pacheco (8 October 1944 – 10 January 2025) was a Uruguayan-born Colombian footballer who played as a forward.

== Career ==
Silva Pacheco played for Uruguayan clubs Danubio and Liverpool before moving to Argentina in 1966. He eventually transferred from Argentina’s Rosario Central to Colombia’s Atletico Nacional in 1970.

He enjoyed his best spell at Atletico Junior from 1973 to 1976. In 1973 he won the Golden Boot for being the top scorer in the Colombian first division with 36 goals.

During this time he was naturalised and selected to play in three matches for the Colombia national team in 1975. He was also part of Colombia's squad for the 1975 Copa América tournament.

== Death ==
Silva Pacheco died in Barranquilla, Colombia on 10 January 2025, at the age of 80.
