= Víctor Ephanor =

Brazilian footballer

- Víctor Ephanor

Personal information
- Full name: Epanor Vítor da Costa Filho
- Date of birth: 1 September 1949 (age 77)
- Place of birth: Brazil
- Position: Forward

Senior career*
Years	Team	Apps	(Gls)
1966-1970	Botafogo		
1970-1971	Ceará		
1971-1972	Atlético Junior		
1973-1974	Flamengo		
1974-1976	Atlético Junior		
1976	Independiente Medellín		
1976-1984	Barcelona S.C.		
1984	Unión Magdalena		
1984-1985	Madureira		
- * Club domestic league appearances and goals

Epanor Vítor da Costa Filho (born 1 September 1949 in Brazil), better known as Víctor Ephanor, is a Brazilian former professional footballer. He was noted for his technical ability and creativity during his playing career in South America.
