= Hernán Gaviria =

Colombian footballer (1969-2002)

- Gaviria with the Colombia national football team

Personal information
- Full name: Hernán Gaviria Carvajal
- Date of birth: 27 November 1969
- Place of birth: Carepa, Colombia
- Date of death: 24 October 2002 (aged 32)
- Place of death: Cali, Colombia
- Height: 1.85 m (6 ft 1 in)
- Position: Midfielder

Senior career*
Years	Team	Apps	(Gls)
1990–1997	Atlético Nacional		
1995	→ Deportes Tolima (loan)		
1998–2001	Deportivo Cali		
2001	Shonan Bellmare	23	(4)
2002	Atlético Bucaramanga	10	(1)
2002	Deportivo Cali	17	(0)

International career
1993–1999	Colombia	27	(3)
- * Club domestic league appearances and goals

Hernán Gaviria Carvajal (27 November 1969 – 24 October 2002) was a Colombian footballer, who played as a central midfielder.

== Football career ==
During his career, Gaviria played for Atlético Nacional, Deportes Tolima, Deportivo Cali, Atlético Bucaramanga and Shonan Bellmare of the J2 League.

Gaviria participated in the football tournament at the 1992 Summer Olympics in Barcelona, Spain, scoring twice, and appeared at three stagings of the Copa América, earning two third-place finishes in the 1993 and 1995 editions.

He earned a total of 27 caps for his national team, scoring 3 goals and being selected for the 1994 FIFA World Cup in the United States; in the last group stage match, as Colombia was eliminated unless they beat Switzerland and the USA beat Romania, he netted in a 2–0 win against Switzerland.

== Death ==
Gaviria died on 24 October 2002, when he and teammate Giovanni Córdoba were hit by lightning during a practice session with Deportivo Cali. Gaviria was killed instantly, though he was not pronounced dead until arriving at Valle de Lilli Hospital; Córdoba died three days later. Nicknamed "Carepa" after his hometown in Antioquia Department, Gaviria left a wife and two children, and was only 32 years old.

== Club statistics ==
Club performance			League		Cup		League Cup		Total	
Season	Club	League	Apps	Goals	Apps	Goals	Apps	Goals	Apps	Goals
Japan			League		Emperor's Cup		J.League Cup		Total	
2001	Shonan Bellmare	J2 League	23	4	0	0	1	0	24	4
Total			23	4	0	0	1	0	24	4

== National team statistics ==
Colombia national team
Year	Apps	Goals
1993	6	0
1994	3	2
1995	10	0
1996	0	0
1997	7	1
1998	0	0
1999	1	0
Total	27	3

=== International goals ===
Colombia score listed first, score column indicates score after each Hernán Gaviria goal.

International goals by date, venue, cap, opponent, score, result and competition
No.	Date	Venue	Opponent	Score	Result	Competition
1	5 June 1994	East Rutherford, New Jersey, United States	Greece	1–0	2–0	Friendly
2	26 June 1994	Palo Alto, Los Angeles, United States	Switzerland	1–0	2–0	1994 FIFA World Cup
3	21 June 1997	Estadio Hernando Siles, La Paz, Bolivia	Bolivia	1–2	1–2	1997 Copa América

== Honours ==
Atlético Nacional

- Campeonato Colombiano (2): 1991,1994
- Copa Interamericana (1): 1995

Deportivo Cali

- Campeonato Colombiano (1): 1998
- Copa Libertadores runner-up: 1999

== See also ==
- List of association footballers who died while playing
