= Hayder Palacio =

Colombian footballer (born 1979)

Haider Palacios
Personal information
- Full name: Haider Guillermo Palacio Alvarez
- Date of birth: 22 July 1979 (age 47)
- Place of birth: Barranquilla, Colombia
- Height: 1.79 m (5 ft 10 in)
- Position: Left back

Senior career*
Years	Team	Apps	(Gls)
1998	Deportivo Unicosta	12	(0)
1999–2010	Atlético Junior	432	(9)
2007	→ Deportivo Cali (loan)	27	(0)
2011	Cúcuta Deportivo	19	(0)
2012	Real Cartagena	9	(0)
Total		499	(9)

International career
2004–2007	Colombia	14	(0)
- * Club domestic league appearances and goals

Haider Guillermo Palacio Álvarez (born July 22, 1979) is former Colombian footballer who played as a left back.

== Career ==
Palacio has played football as a left back for Unicosta, Deportivo Cali and Junior de Barranquilla. He won two league titles with Junior (in 2004 and 2010) before moving to Cúcuta Deportivo in January 2011.

He has been capped by the Colombia national football team for 2006 Qualifiers and Copa Oro 2005.

== Honors ==
Junior

Copa Mustang/Liga Postobón (2): 2004-II, 2010-I

Sporting positions
Preceded by Roberto Peñalosa	Atlético Junior captain 2005–2007	Succeeded by Giovanni Hernández
