= Arnoldo Iguarán =

Colombian footballer (born 1957)

Personal information
- Full name: Arnoldo Alberto Iguarán Zúñiga
- Date of birth: 18 January 1957 (age 69)
- Place of birth: Riohacha, Colombia
- Height: 1.77 m (5 ft 10 in)
- Position: Striker

Senior career*
Years	Team	Apps	(Gls)
1978–1981	Cúcuta Deportivo	156	(44)
1982	Deportivo Táchira		
1982	Deportes Tolima	18	(4)
1983	Independiente Santa Fe	11	(3)
1983–1991	Millonarios	258	(88)
1992	Atlético Junior	28	(3)
1993–1995	Millonarios	78	(32)
1995–1997	Cúcuta Deportivo	35	(14)
Total		584	(188)

International career
1979–1993	Colombia	68	(25)
- * Club domestic league appearances and goals

Arnoldo Alberto Iguarán Zúñiga (born 18 January 1957), also known as El Guajiro, is a Colombian former professional footballer who played as a forward. He earned 68 caps for the Colombia national team between 1979 and 1993, playing at the 1990 FIFA World Cup and two Copa América tournaments. With 25 international goals, he was the nation's sole top scorer of all time until Radamel Falcao surpassed him in 2017.

== Club career ==
Born in Riohacha, Iguarán started and ended his club football career with Cúcuta Deportivo. He spent 12 years at Millonarios, and won the Colombian league in 1987 and 1988 with the club. In 13 seasons with Millonarios, he scored 120 goals in 336 league games. Iguarán returned to Cúcuta Deportivo and retired from playing at age 40, making him one of the oldest players in Colombian league history.

== International career ==
Iguarán is also considered one of the best players ever in the Colombia national team, having previously held the goalscoring record with 25 goals in 68 games between 1979 and 1993, until it was matched by Radamel Falcao in 2015.

One of the most memorable victories he had while playing at the Colombian team was in the 1991 Copa América, where they defeated Brazil 2–0, the first goal was scored by Antony de Ávila, and the second one was scored by the "El Guájiro" Iguarán himself, in the 66th minute of the match.

Since 1991, Iguarán had been considered Colombia's all-time goal scorer with 25 goals until Radamel Falcao tied him in 2015. During Falcao's 24th goal in a friendly match against Kuwait, a match commentator on Colombian television claimed that Falcao had tied Iguarán at 24 goals sparking a nationwide debate on whether Iguarán had scored 24 or 25 goals.

The controversy stems from a 1988 friendly match against the United States in which Iguarán scored both of the game's goals. However, video evidence suggests that one of the goals deflected off teammate Alexis García. Regardless, the match report credited Iguarán with both goals and both FIFA and the Colombian Football Federation have Iguarán on record with 25 goals.

When interviewed by Colombian radio about the controversy Iguarán said, "In my records I have 25 and the Federation has 25 as well. Anyway, I don't worry about that and I won't lose any sleep over it. I think that all records are meant to be broken and this one was not going to be the exception. Someday, another striker had to come and break it and truthfully it is an honor that it's Falcao, a player I much admire."

== Legacy ==
After his retirement in the 1990s, a football academy was founded in his honor by his brother Camilo Iguarán.

== Career statistics ==
Scores and results list Colombia's goal tally first, score column indicates score after each Iguarán goal.

List of international goals scored by Arnoldo Iguarán
No.	Date	Venue	Opponent	Score	Result	Competition
1	22 August 1979	Estadio Nemesio Camacho, Bogotá, Colombia	Venezuela	1–0	4–0	1979 Copa América
2	2 March 1985	Estadio Defensores del Chaco, Asunción, Paraguay	Paraguay	2–0	3–0	Friendly
3	19 April 1985	Estadio Nemesio Camacho, Bogotá, Colombia	Paraguay	1–1	2–2	Friendly
4	28 April 1985	Estadio Nemesio Camacho, Bogotá, Colombia	Uruguay	2–1	2–1	Friendly
5	1 July 1987	Estadio Gigante de Arroyito, Rosario, Argentina	Bolivia	2–0	2–0	1987 Copa América
6	5 July 1987	Estadio Gigante de Arroyito, Rosario, Argentina	Paraguay	1–0	3–0	1987 Copa América
7	5 July 1987	Estadio Gigante de Arroyito, Rosario, Argentina	Paraguay	2–0	3–0	1987 Copa América
8	5 July 1987	Estadio Gigante de Arroyito, Rosario, Argentina	Paraguay	3–0	3–0	1987 Copa América
9	14 May 1988	Miami Orange Bowl, Miami, United States	United States	1–0 (Note: The first goal is credited to Iguarán by FIFA and FCF, however some sources credit it to Alexis García.)	2–0	Friendly
10	14 May 1988	Miami Orange Bowl, Miami, United States	United States	2–0	2–0	Friendly
11	19 May 1988	Helsinki Olympic Stadium, Helsinki, Finland	Finland	3–1	3–1	Friendly
12	7 August 1988	Estadio Nemesio Camacho, Bogotá, Colombia	Uruguay	1–0	2–1	Gonzalo Jimenez Cup
13	9 March 1989	Estadio Metropolitano Roberto Meléndez, Barranquilla, Colombia	Argentina	1–0	1–0	Friendly
14	27 June 1989	Miami Orange Bowl, Miami, United States	Haiti	2–0	4–0	Friendly
15	3 July 1989	Estádio Fonte Nova, Salvador, Brazil	Venezuela	2–0	4–2	1989 Copa América
16	3 July 1989	Estádio Fonte Nova, Salvador, Brazil	Venezuela	4–1	4–2	1989 Copa América
17	9 July 1989	Estádio do Arruda, Recife, Brazil	Peru	1–0	1–1	1989 Copa América
18	20 August 1989	Estadio Metropolitano Roberto Meléndez, Barranquilla] Colombia	Ecuador	1–0	2–0	1990 FIFA World Cup qualification
19	20 August 1989	Estadio Metropolitano Roberto Meléndez, Barranquilla] Colombia	Ecuador	2–0	2–0	1990 FIFA World Cup qualification
20	27 August 1989	Estadio Defensores del Chaco, Asunción, Paraguay	Paraguay	1–1	1–2	1990 FIFA World Cup qualification
21	17 September 1989	Estadio Metropolitano Roberto Meléndez, Barranquilla] Colombia	Paraguay	1–1	2–1	1990 FIFA World Cup qualification
22	4 May 1990	Guaranteed Rate Field, Chicago, United States	Poland	1–0	2–1	1990 Marlboro Cup
23	6 June 1991	Råsunda Stadium, Solna, Sweden	Sweden	2–1	2–2	Friendly
24	13 July 1991	Estadio Sausalito, Viña del Mar, Chile	Brazil	2–0	2–0	1991 Copa América
25	17 July 1991	Estadio Nacional Julio Martínez Prádanos, Santiago, Chile	Chile	1–0	1–1	1991 Copa América

== Honours ==
Deportivo Táchira

- Venezuelan Primera División: 1981

Millonarios

- Categoría Primera A: 1987, 1988

Individual

- Copa America Golden Boot: 1987
