= Alex Valderrama =

Colombian footballer (born 1960)

Personal information
- Full name: Alex Valderrama Pinedo
- Date of birth: 1 October 1960 (age 66)
- Place of birth: Santa Marta, Colombia
- Height: 1.72 m (5 ft 8 in)
- Position: Forward

Senior career*
Years	Team	Apps	(Gls)
1978–1983	Unión Magdalena		
1982	Millonarios		
1983	Unión Magdalena		
1984–1987	Atlético Junior		
1988–1990	Atlético Nacional		
1991	Deportivo Táchira		
1991	Atlético Junior		
1993	Unión Magdalena		
1994–1995	Anzoátegui FC		
1995–1996	Deportivo Unicosta		

International career
1979–1988	Colombia	22	(5)
- * Club domestic league appearances and goals

Alex Valderrama Pinedo (born 1 October 1960), nicknamed Didi, is a Colombian former footballer who played as a forward. He made 20 appearances scoring five goals for the Colombia national team from 1979 to 1985. He was also part of Colombia's squad for the 1979 Copa América tournament.
