= José María Pazo =

Colombian footballer (born 1964)

Personal information
- Full name: José María Pazo Torres
- Date of birth: 4 April 1964 (age 62)
- Place of birth: Valledupar, Colombia
- Height: 1.84 m (6 ft 0 in)
- Position: Goalkeeper

Senior career*
Years	Team	Apps	(Gls)
1990–1997	Atlético Junior	351	(0)
1997–1998	Atlético Nacional	0	(0)
1999	Atlético Junior	39	(0)
2000	Atlético Nacional	0	(0)
Total		390	(0)

International career
1993–1995	Colombia	3	(0)
- * Club domestic league appearances and goals

José María Pazo Torres (born 4 April 1964) is a Colombian former footballer who played as a goalkeeper.

== Club career ==
Pazo played for a few clubs, including Atlético Junior.

== International career ==
Pazo played for the Colombia national football team and was a participant at the 1994 FIFA World Cup.
