= Hernán Herrera =

Colombian footballer (born 1957)

Personal information
- Full name: Hernán Darío Herrera Ramírez
- Date of birth: 28 October 1957 (age 69)
- Place of birth: Angelópolis, Colombia
- Height: 1.73 m (5 ft 8 in)
- Position: Midfielder

Senior career*
Years	Team	Apps	(Gls)
1977–1984	Atlético Nacional	354	(73)
1985–1992	América de Cali	193	(35)

International career
1979–1985	Colombia	40	(9)

Managerial career
- 1998: Univalle
- 1999–2000: Real Cartagena
- 2004–2005: Real Cartagena
- 2006: America de Cali
- 2006: Atlético Bucaramanga
- 2007–2008: Real Cartagena
- 2009: Deportivo Pereira (assistant)
- 2010: Deportivo Pasto
- 2013–2022: Atlético Nacional (youth)
- 2018: Atlético Nacional (caretaker)
- 2022: Atlético Nacional
- 2022–2023: Atlético Nacional (youth)
- 2023: Once Caldas (assistant)
- 2023–2026: Once Caldas
- * Club domestic league appearances and goals

Hernán Darío Herrera Ramírez (born 28 October 1957) is a Colombian football manager and former player who played as a midfielder.

Herrera made eight appearances for the Colombia national team from 1979 to 1985. He was also part of Colombia's squad for the 1979 Copa América tournament.
