= Freddy Rincón =

Colombian footballer (1966–2022)

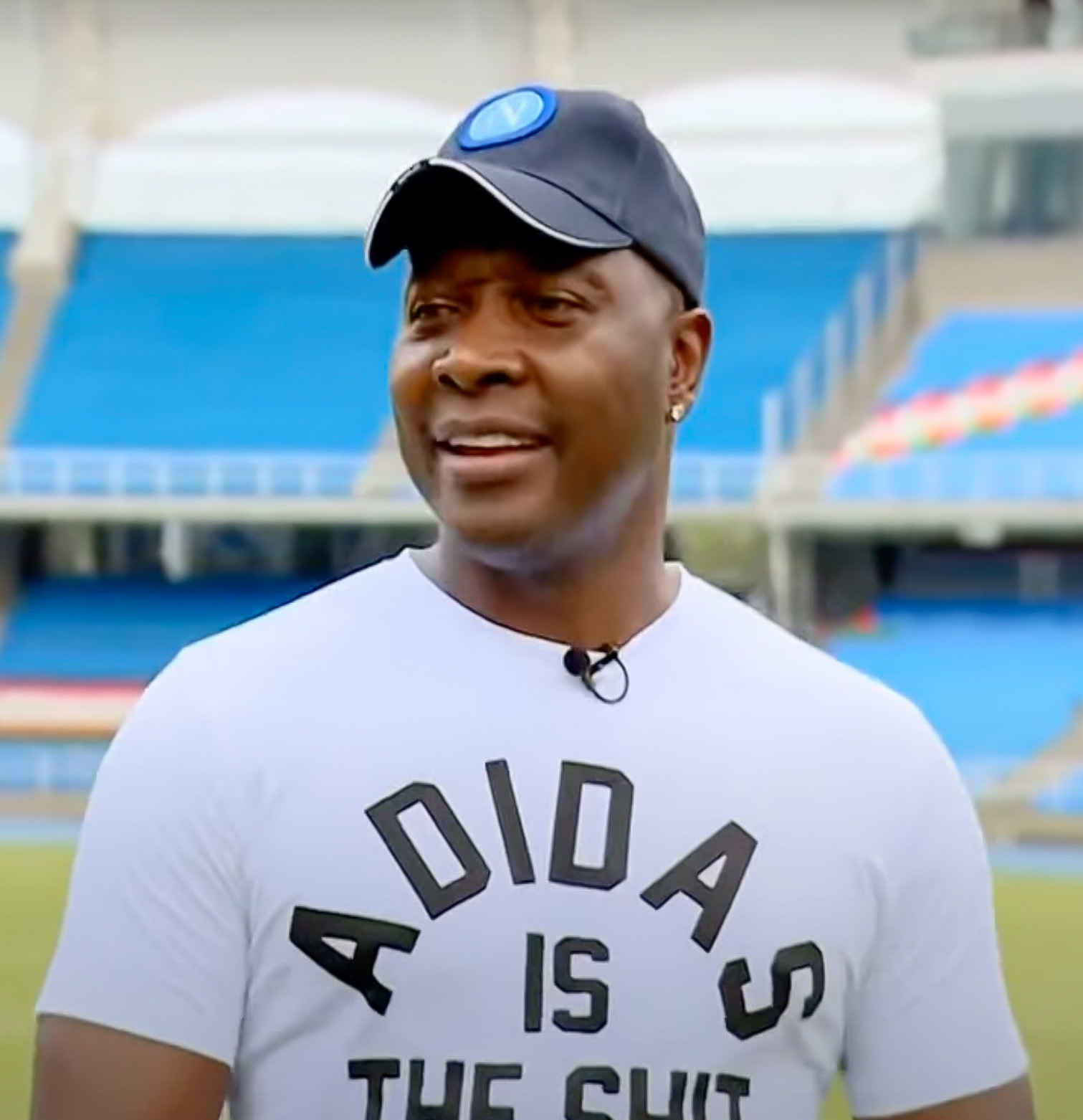
- Rincón in 2022

Personal information
- Full name: Freddy Eusebio Rincón Valencia
- Date of birth: 14 August 1966
- Place of birth: Buenaventura, Valle del Cauca, Colombia
- Date of death: 13 April 2022 (aged 55)
- Place of death: Cali, Valle del Cauca, Colombia
- Height: 1.88 m (6 ft 2 in)
- Position: Midfielder

Senior career*
Years	Team	Apps	(Gls)
1986–1988	Atlético Buenaventura	77	(18)
1988–1990	Santa Fe	82	(20)
1990–1993	América de Cali	177	(54)
1993–1995	Palmeiras	28	(12)
1994–1995	→ Napoli (loan)	28	(7)
1995–1997	Real Madrid	21	(0)
1996–1997	→ Palmeiras (loan)	17	(7)
1997–2000	Corinthians	151	(37)
2000	Santos	20	(1)
2001	Cruzeiro	16	(1)
2004	Corinthians	7	(2)
Total		627	(162)

International career
1990–2001	Colombia	84	(17)

Managerial career
- 2005: Iraty
- 2006: São Bento
- 2009: São José
- 2009: Corinthians (youth)
- 2010: Flamengo de Guarulhos
- 2010: Atlético Mineiro (assistant)
- * Club domestic league appearances and goals

Freddy Eusebio Rincón Valencia (Spanish pronunciation: [ˈfɾeði riŋˈkon]; 14 August 1966 – 13 April 2022) was a Colombian professional footballer who played 84 games for the Colombia national team between 1990 and 2001. A versatile midfielder, he was capable of playing on the left, in the centre or as an attacking midfielder. At club level he played for Independiente Santa Fé, América de Cali (Colombia), Napoli (Italy), Real Madrid (Spain), Palmeiras, Santos, and Corinthians (Brazil).

== Club career ==
Rincón began his professional career at Independiente Santa Fé in 1986, winning the Copa Colombia in 1989 with the capital club, as well as gaining national acclaim for his performances.

With América de Cali he won the Colombian Championship in 1990 and 1992.

It was his performances at the 1994 World Cup that prompted Parma to sign the Colombian midfielder. However the three foreigner rule meant he was loaned out to Napoli, and was eventually sold onto Real Madrid for the 1995–96 season.

Rincón spent the latter part of his career playing club football in Brazil where he played for Palmeiras, Corinthians, Santos and Cruzeiro. During his time with Corinthians the club won the Brazilian championship in 1998 and 1999 and the first FIFA Club World Cup in 2000, his greatest title.

== International career ==
Rincón scored 17 goals in 84 caps for the Colombia national team, playing in the 1990, 1994, and 1998 World Cups.

His most memorable goal is the one he scored against West Germany in Milan, Italy on 19 June during the 1990 World Cup. Playing into injury time, Colombia needed a goal to draw the game and avoid elimination from the tournament at the group stages. When played through by a pass from Carlos Valderrama, Rincon held his nerve and calmly fired the ball through the legs of Bodo Illgner to secure the draw his team needed. During a qualifying match for the 1994 FIFA World Cup on 5 September 1993 against Argentina, he scored the first goal of the game receiving the ball from teammate Carlos Valderrama and passing the Argentine goalkeeper, Sergio Goycochea, before scoring the third goal in a 5–0 victory that secured Colombia's place at the World Cup.

== Coaching career ==
In 2005, Rincón started a football manager career, after he was hired as Iraty manager for the 2006 season. On 27 September 2006, Rincón was hired as São Bento's manager. He was the coach of São José Esporte Clube of São José dos Campos, São Paulo.

He was hired as Corinthians youth team head coach in 2009.

== Personal life ==
Rincón had been a member of the Church of Jesus Christ of Latter-day Saints since 20 August 2005. He was baptized in São Paulo Perdizes Stake in Brazil.

In 2007, Rincón came under criminal investigation in Colombia and Panama, facing charges of collaboration with cocaine kingpin Pablo Rayo Montaño and suspicion of money laundering. On 10 May, São Paulo police took him into custody after a Panamanian request for extradition. In August 2013, Rincón suffered multiple injuries in a car accident in his native Valle del Cauca, where he underwent surgery at a local hospital.

Rincón's son is professional footballer Sebastián Rincón, who once played for Barracas Central in Argentina.

== Death ==
On 11 April 2022, Rincón was hospitalised with critical head injuries after the car he was driving collided with a bus in the Colombian city of Cali. Four of his passengers and the bus driver were also injured. He died two days later.

== Career statistics ==
Scores and results list Colombia's goal tally first, score column indicates score after each Rincón goal.

List of international goals scored by Freddy Rincón
No.	Date	Venue	Opponent	Score	Result	Competition
1	26 May 1990	Cairo International Stadium, Cairo, Egypt	Egypt	1–1	1–1	Friendly
2	2 June 1990	Népstadion, Budapest, Hungary	Hungary	1–2	1–3	Friendly
3	19 June 1990	Stadio Giuseppe Meazza, Milan, Italy	Germany	1–1	1–1	1990 FIFA World Cup
4	3 February 1991	Miami Orange Bowl, Miami, United States	Switzerland	2–1	2–3	1991 Miami Cup
5	6 June 1991	Råsunda Stadium, Solna, Sweden	Sweden	1–1	2–2	Friendly
6	23 June 1993	Estadio George Capwell, Guayaquil, Ecuador	Argentina	1–1	1–1	1993 Copa América
7	8 August 1993	Estadio Nacional, Lima, Peru	Peru	1–0	1–0	1994 FIFA World Cup qualification
8	22 August 1993	Estadio Defensores del Chaco, Asunción, Paraguay	Paraguay	1–1	1–1	1994 FIFA World Cup qualification
9	29 August 1993	Estadio Metropolitano Roberto Meléndez, Barranquilla, Colombia	Peru	2–0	4–0	1994 FIFA World Cup qualification
10	5 September 1993	Estadio Monumental Antonio Vespucio Liberti, Buenos Aires, Argentina	Argentina	1–0	5–0	1994 FIFA World Cup qualification
11	5 September 1993	Estadio Monumental Antonio Vespucio Liberti, Buenos Aires, Argentina	Argentina	3–0	5–0	1994 FIFA World Cup qualification
12	5 June 1994	Giants Stadium, East Rutherford, United States	Greece	2–0	2–0	Friendly
13	10 July 1995	Estadio Atilio Paiva Olivera, Rivera, Uruguay	Ecuador	1–0	1–0	1995 Copa América
14	16 July 1995	Estadio Centenario, Montevideo, Uruguay	Paraguay	1–1	1–1	1995 Copa América
15	22 July 1995	Estadio Domingo Burgueño, Maldonado, Uruguay	United States	4–1	4–1	1995 Copa América
16	10 November 1996	Estadio Hernando Siles, La Paz, Bolivia	Bolivia	2–2	2–2	1998 FIFA World Cup qualification
17	23 May 1998	Giants Stadium, East Rutherford, United States	Scotland	2–2	2–2	Friendly

== Honours ==
Independiente Santa Fe

- Copa Colombia: 1989

América de Cali

- Categoría Primera A: 1990, 1992

Palmeiras

- Campeonato Brasileiro Série A: 1994
- Campeonato Paulista: 1994

Corinthians

- Brasileirão: 1998, 1999
- Campeonato Paulista: 1999
- FIFA Club World Cup: 2000

Colombia

- Copa América third place: 1993, 1995

Individual

- South American Team of the Year: 1993, 1999
- Bola de Prata: 1999

== See also ==
- List of Colombians
