= Willington Ortiz =

Colombian footballer (born 1952)

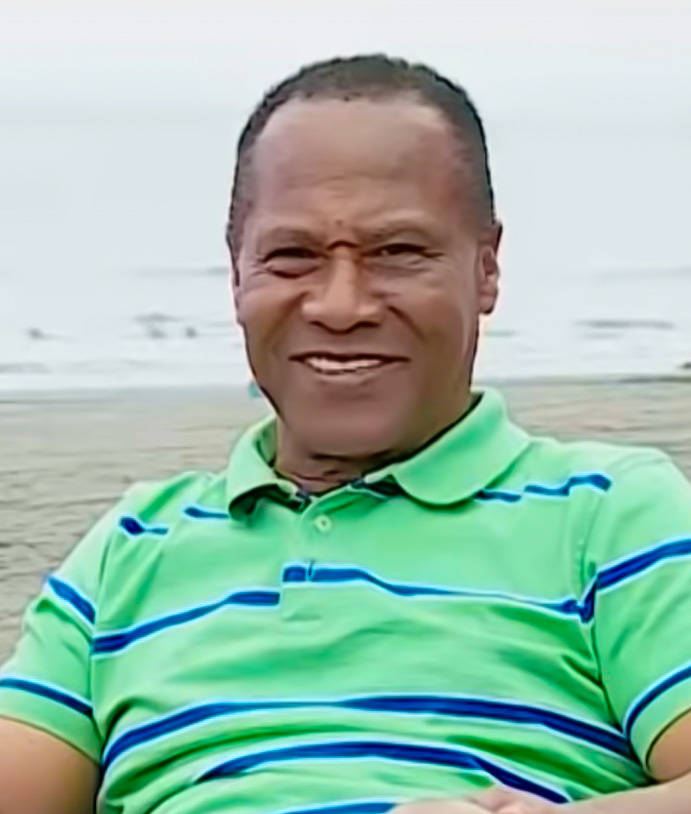

Personal information
- Full name: Willington Alfonso Ortiz Palacio
- Date of birth: March 26, 1952 (age 74)
- Place of birth: Tumaco, Colombia
- Position: Midfielder

Senior career*
Years	Team	Apps	(Gls)
1972–1979	Millonarios	301	(90)
1980–1982	Deportivo Cali	113	(44)
1983–1988	América de Cali	169	(50)
Total		583	(184)

International career
1973–1985	Colombia	49	(12)
- * Club domestic league appearances and goals as of September 2008

Willington Alfonso Ortiz Palacio (born March 26, 1952, in Tumaco) is a Colombian former professional footballer who played as forward or winger. He played 49 times for the Colombia national team scoring 12 goals and is the top Colombian player in the IFFHS's rank of South American Player of the Century.

== Career ==
Ortiz started his illustrious career at striker in 1971 in the youth system of Millonarios, made his first team debut against Internacional de Porto Alegre scoring the game-winning goal. He won the DIMAYOR Colombian First Division Championship (now the Categoría Primera A) with Millonarios in 1972, and 1978. He played with Millonarios until 1979, participating in the Copa Libertadores 1973, 1974, 1976, and 1979 with the club. In 1980, Ortiz was transferred to Deportivo Cali and played for them for three seasons. Willington was transferred to América de Cali in late 1982, and won the Colombian Domestic league title (now Copa Mustang) in 1983, 1984, 1985, and 1986.

== Colombian National Squad ==
Ortiz played for the Colombia Olympic team at the 1972 Summer Olympics. He played in three editions of Copa América in 1975, 1979 and 1983 reaching the final in 1975. He also played for the Colombian Senior National Team that took part in qualifiers for the FIFA World Cup in 1974, 1978, 1982, and 1986.

== Titles ==
Season	Team	Title
1972	(Colombia) Millonarios	Colombian league
1978	(Colombia) Millonarios	Colombian league
1983	(Colombia) América de Cali	Colombian league
1984	(Colombia) América de Cali	Colombian league
1985	(Colombia) América de Cali	Colombian league
1986	(Colombia) América de Cali	Colombian league
