= Alexis Mendoza =

Colombian footballer and manager (born 1961)

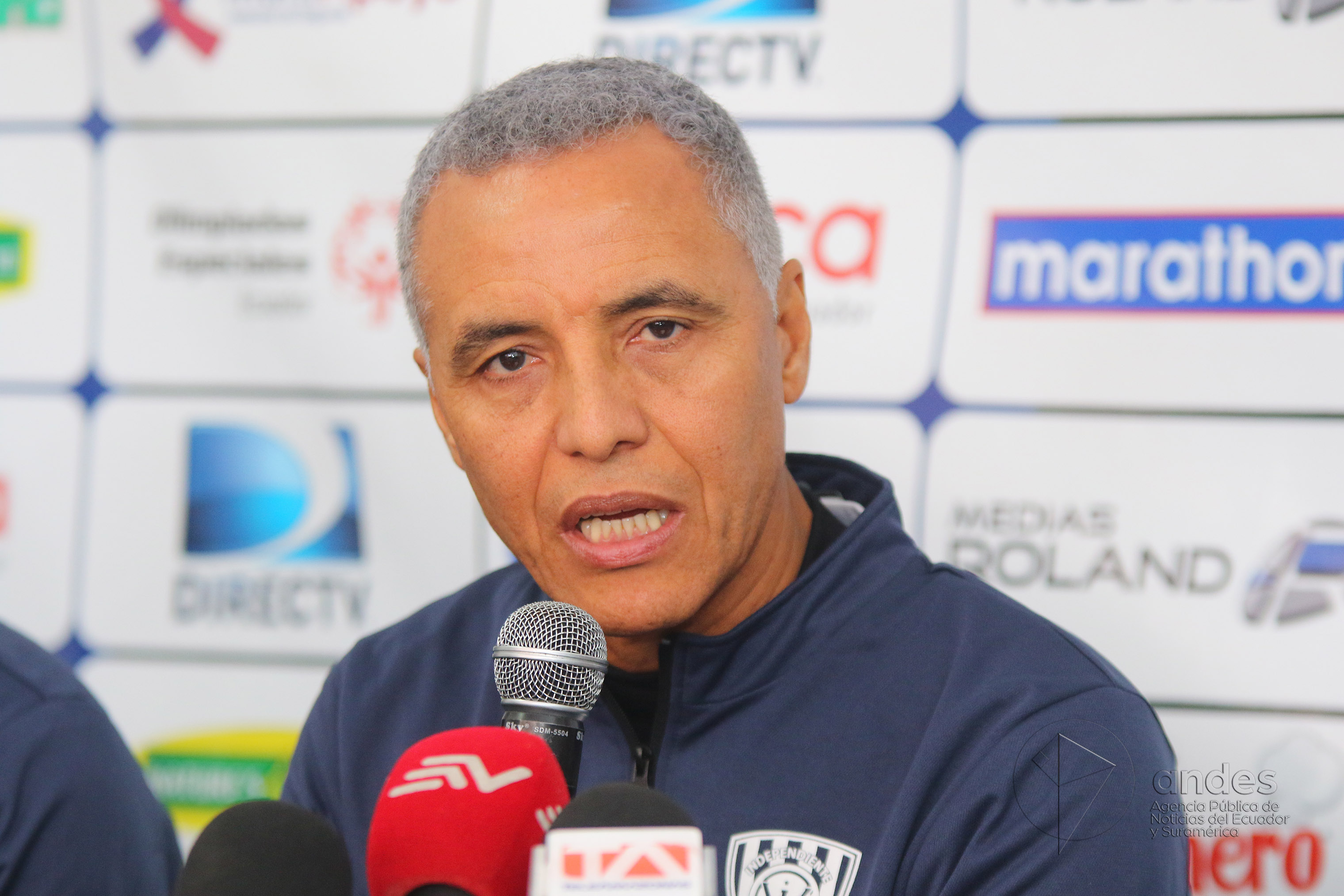
- Mendoza with Independiente del Valle in 2016

Personal information
- Full name: Alexis Antonio Mendoza Barrina
- Date of birth: November 8, 1961 (age 64)
- Place of birth: Barranquilla, Colombia
- Height: 1.85 m (6 ft 1 in)
- Position: Defender

Senior career*
Years	Team	Apps	(Gls)
1983–1990	Atlético Junior	220	(13)
1990–1992	América de Cali	101	(1)
1993–1996	Atlético Junior	148	(5)
1997	Veracruz	15	(0)
1998	Atlético Junior	48	(3)
Total		532	(22)

International career
1987–1997	Colombia	67	(2)

Managerial career
- 2003: Alianza Petrolera
- 2004–2006: Colombia (assistant)
- 2007–2010: Honduras (assistant)
- 2008: Honduras U23
- 2010–2014: Ecuador (assistant)
- 2015–2016: Atlético Junior
- 2016–2017: Independiente del Valle
- 2018: Atlético Junior
- 2019: Sporting Cristal
- 2019: Independiente Medellín
- 2023-: Honduras (assistant)
- * Club domestic league appearances and goals

Alexis Antonio Mendoza Barrina (born November 8, 1961) is a retired Colombian footballer, manager and the current assistant manager of Honduras national football team

He was the assistant manager of Honduras national football team during the 2010 FIFA World Cup and of the Ecuador national football team during the 2014 FIFA World Cup. Mendoza was capped 67 times and scored 2 international goals for Colombia between 1987 and 1997.

== Club career ==
Mendoza played most of his club career as a defender for Atlético Junior. He also played for América de Cali between 1990 and 1992, where he won two Colombian league championships (1990 & 1992).

In 1993, he returned to Junior and helped them to win the 1993 and 1995 Colombian league championships.

Towards the end of his career Mendoza played for Veracruz in Mexico.

== International career ==
Mendoza played one match at the 1994 World Cup, and was an unused substitute for the 1990 World Cup. Mendoza also played in four editions of the Copa América in 1987, 1989, 1993 and 1995

== Honours ==
=== Player ===
==== Club ====
América de Cali

- Colombian League: 1990, 1992

Atlético Junior

- Colombian League: 1993, 1995

=== Manager ===
Atlético Junior

- Copa Colombia: 2015

Sporting positions
Preceded by Dulio Miranda	Atlético Junior captain 1985–1990	Succeeded by Gabriel Martínez
