= Rubén Darío Hernández =

Colombian footballer (born 1965)

Ruben Darío Hernández
Personal information
- Full name: Ruben Darío Hernández Ariza
- Date of birth: 19 February 1965 (age 61)
- Place of birth: Armenia, Colombia
- Height: 1.62 m (5 ft 4 in)
- Position: Striker

Senior career*
| Years | Team | Apps | (Gls) |
| 1987–1992 | Millonarios | 114 | (21) |
| 1993–1994 | Independiente Medellin | 45 | (21) |
| 1994 | Deportivo Pereira | 41 | (24) |
| 1994 | America de Cali | 12 | (6) |
| 1995 | Independiente Santa Fe | 26 | (13) |
| 1996 | NY/NJ MetroStars | 10 | (0) |
| 1997–1998 | Deportes Quindio | 48 | (15) |
| 1999 | Deportes Tolima | 4 | (0) |
| 2000 | Deportes Quindio | 23 | (2) |
| Total | | 323 | (102) |

International career
| 1988–1996 | Colombia | 17 | (1) |

Managerial career
- 2018–2023: Deportes Quindío (assistant)
- 2024: Deportes Quindío
- * Club domestic league appearances and goals

Ruben Darío Hernández Ariza (born 19 February 1965 in Armenia) is a Colombian football manager and former player who played as a striker. He currently is a free agent.

Hernández is one of the leading scorers in his country's history, and one of the early busts of Major League Soccer.

Overall, Hernández scored 180 goals in the Colombian League for ten different teams: Deportes Quindío, Millonarios, Once Caldas, Atlético Nacional, Envigado, Independiente Medellín, América de Cali, Independiente Santa Fe, Deportes Tolima, and Deportivo Pereira. He retired in 2000.

In 1996, "Rubencho" signed with Major League Soccer's MetroStars, but lasted only ten games with them without scoring a goal. He became unhappy in the United States and the league granted him a release back to Colombia.

For Colombia, Hernández scored one goal in 17 caps and played for his country at the 1990 FIFA World Cup.
