= Bernardo Redín =

Colombian footballer (born 1963)

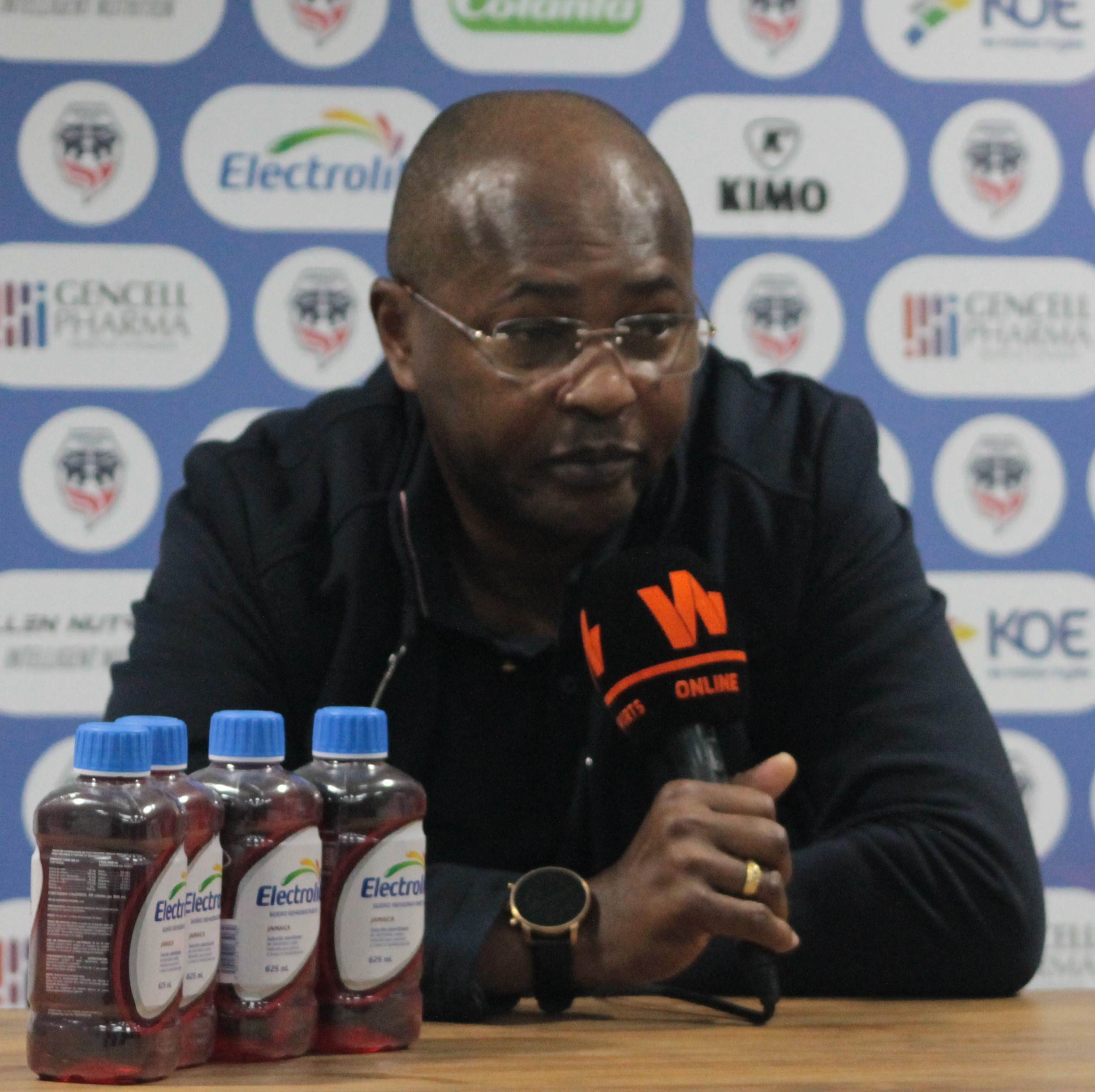
- Redín as Cúcuta Deportivo manager

Personal information
- Full name: Bernardo Redín Valverde
- Date of birth: 26 February 1963 (age 63)
- Place of birth: Cali, Colombia
- Height: 1.78 m (5 ft 10 in)
- Position: Attacking midfielder

Senior career*
| Years | Team | Apps | (Gls) |
| 1981–1989 | Deportivo Cali | | |
| 1990–1991 | CSKA Sofia | 13 | (3) |
| 1992–1996 | América de Cali | 64 | (8) |
| 1996–1999 | Deportes Quindío | | |
| 2000 | Atlético Huila | 22 | (0) |
| 2000 | Oriente Petrolero | 4 | (0) |
| 2001 | Atlético Huila | | |

International career
| 1987–1991 | Colombia | 40 | (5) |

Managerial career
- 2002–2003: Atlético Huila
- 2004: Deportivo Cali
- 2004–2005: Atlético Huila
- 2006: América de Cali
- 2007: Monagas
- 2008: The Strongest
- 2008–2009: Deportivo Pasto
- 2010–2011: Academia
- 2013–2014: Atlético Bucaramanga
- 2015–2017: Atlético Nacional (assistant)
- 2017–2018: Flamengo (assistant)
- 2018–2020: Chile (assistant)
- 2019: Chile U-23
- 2020–2022: Colombia (assistant)
- 2022–2023: Cúcuta Deportivo
- 2023: Honduras U23
- 2024: Deportivo Garcilaso
- 2024–2025: Cúcuta Deportivo
- 2025–2026: Tauro
- 2026: Técnico Universitario
- * Club domestic league appearances and goals

Bernardo Redín Valverde (born 26 February 1963 in Cali) is a Colombian football coach and former footballer who played as an attacking midfielder.

== Playing career ==
=== Club ===
During the 1980s Bernardo Redin was part of Deportivo Cali's "Dynamic Duo" with famous football player Carlos "El Pibe" Valderrama.

=== International ===
Redín earned 40 caps and scored 5 goals for the Colombia national team from 1987 to 1991, and scored 2 goals in the 1990 FIFA World Cup.

== Managerial career ==
After Redín retired from playing, Redín became a football coach. He has led Atlético Huila, Deportivo Cali, América de Cali, Monagas, The Strongest, Deportivo Pasto, Academia and Atlético Bucaramanga.

As of 2014, Redín became the assistant coach of Atlético Nacional Reinaldo Rueda, as well since 2017 at Flamengo.
