= Estadio Metropolitano Roberto Meléndez =

Stadium in Barranquilla, Colombia

- El Coloso de la Ciudadela; La Casa de la Selección; El Súper Metro
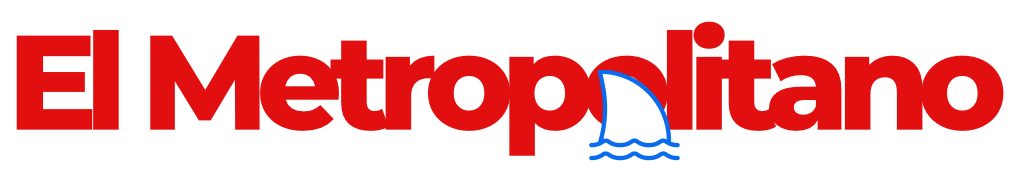

- Estadio Metropolitano Roberto Meléndez, interior view after the 2026 renovation.
- Interactive map of Estadio Metropolitano Roberto Meléndez
- Full name: Estadio Metropolitano Roberto Meléndez
- Former names: Estadio Metropolitano
- Location: Barranquilla, Colombia
- Coordinates: 10°55′36.7″N 74°48′02.6″W
- Owner: Mayor District of Brranquila
- Operator: Secretariat of Recreation and Sports
- Capacity: 65,000
- Surface: Hybrid grass
- Scoreboard: 2 LED
- Field size: 110 x 75

Construction
- Groundbreaking: 1975
- Opened: 1986
- Renovated: 2011, 2026
- Expanded: January – October 2026
- Cost: $173,000,000,000 Colombian pesos (Reconstruction)
- Architects: José Francisco Ramos, Oscar Ramos, Roberto Salcedo
- Structural engineer: Alcides Ojeda

Tenants
- Colombia national football team (1987–present); Atlético Junior (1986–present)

Estadio Metropolitano Roberto Meléndez, commonly known as Estadio Metropolitano, or colloquially, El Metro, is a football-specific stadium in Barranquilla, Colombia, which was originally designed for multi-purpose use. It is the home stadium of local football team Atlético Junior, and currently has a capacity of nearly 65,000 spectators. The facility was built with an initial capacity of 60,000 for the Colombian World Cup bid in 1986. The stadium was inaugurated that same year; however, following an extensive renovation in 2011, it was converted into an all-seater venue with a capacity of 46,788. Today, following expansion and modernization work—culminating in 2026—the stadium is no longer used for athletics, as the track facilities were removed when the pitch level was lowered and the existing stands were extended downward, closer to the playing field—a change that added thousands of seats and, more recently, reintroduced standing areas. It is the largest stadium in Colombia. The first official name of the stadium was Estadio Metropolitano, which was changed around 1991 in order to honor the Colombian footballer Roberto Meléndez (1912–2000). This is the official stadium for the national football team of Colombia.

== Inauguration ==
The construction of Estadio Metropolitano lasted six years, after which a grand opening was held on May 11, 1986 with a folk show of 5,000 artists, an awards ceremony for VIPs Sport Colombia, a giant ball that left 200 white doves and the holding of an international friendly match.

The opening match was played between the teams Junior and Uruguay national team, led by coach Omar Borrás, which was preparing for 1986 FIFA World Cup. The match ended with Uruguay's victory 1-2, goals scored by Enzo Francescoli (the first goal scored in the stadium at 62 minutes) and Jorge da Silva for the visitors and José "Perilla" Angulo for the locals, all goals scored in the second half. The first red card was for Uruguayan player Walter Barrios at 87 minutes.

Four days later, another match was held against Argentina national team during their tour in preparation for the same event, which ended up winning the future world championship.

== History ==
Before the construction of Estadio Metropolitano, the city only had the Romelio Martínez Stadium, which was built in 1934 with a capacity of 10,000 spectators. Since the advent of professional football to Barranquilla in 1948, it became evident the need for a sports arena that would house the football fans.

In the early 1970s, the expansion of the Romelio Martínez Stadium was projected with the construction of new bleachers for the sports arena. However, an architectural error would force the reduction of the 72nd Street to complete the works. After some time it was decided to demolish the new forum yet unfinished in the midst of strong criticism, which the local press called the Gallery of Shame. Due to the large amount of money being spent on this project, it failed because subsequent studies showed the impossibility of conducting a proper extension to the scenario, it was decided that the best solution was to design an entirely new football stadium for the city.

In 1979, the governor of the department of Atlántico, Pedro Martín Leyes presented President Julio César Turbay the project to build a new stadium in Barranquilla, supported the idea of doing a host of World Cup 1986 to be held in Colombia. The project is approved and the foundation stone for the building is placed on December 7 of 1979 in an area of 30 hectares, located on the avenue Circunvalar with Murillo Street, donated by the Instituto de Crédito Territorial (Inscredial). For its construction the firm Metrofútbol was formed, led by architect Jaime de Biasse. José Francisco Ramos was appointed as architect of the stadium, awarding construction to engineer Julio Gerlein and electrical Engineer Luis Gonzalo Prada Ch.

=== 2026 expansion and modernization ===
Estadio Metropolitano Roberto Meléndez during 2026's renovation

In 2025, the Barranquilla City Hall announced a renovation to expand the capacity of the "Coloso de la Ciudadela" from 46,788 to 65,000 spectators. The project involves removing the stadium's running track and using that space to build additional seating. In addition, a hybrid turf surface will be installed, and the entrances and facade will be remodeled. This renovation is being carried out in preparation for Barranquilla being awarded the single-match final of the 2026 CONMEBOL Sudamericana.

== Events ==
This stadium was one of the venues where Colombian National Games in 1992 were contested.

Hosted the 2001 Copa América including the opening ceremony with a colourful parade and a show dance. The venue held six matches in Group A which included the national teams of Colombia, Venezuela, Chile and Ecuador, between July 11 and 17.

Was the venue where Colombia national team played the qualification matches for World Cups in Italy (1990), United States (1994), France (1998) and Germany (2006). For the first three, Colombia qualified for the final tournament after 28 years of absence. It also hosted the qualification matches for 2014 FIFA World Cup where Colombia qualified again after 16 years of absence.

It hosted the farewell match for Carlos Valderrama on February 1, 2004, which was attended by players Diego Maradona, José Luis Chilavert, Enzo Francescoli, Alberto Acosta, Mauricio Serna, Faustino Asprilla, Arnoldo Iguarán, Leonel Álvarez and the popular singer Carlos Vives.

In 2006, the stadium hosted some football matches of the XX Central American and Caribbean Games, which were held in Cartagena.

In 2011, the stadium was one of eight stadiums that hosted matches during the FIFA U-20 World Cup, including the opening ceremony.

The stadium has also hosted numerous concerts of various artists such as REO Speedwagon, Franco De Vita, Shakira, Juanes and Carlos Vives.

On June 27, 2019, the stadium was announced as the venue to host the 2021 Copa América Final. The announcement was made by Ernesto Lucena, Director of Coldeportes.

== Facilities ==
The stadium has five galleries: Southern (Korea), with the "Frente Rojiblanco Sur" supporters; Northern (Vietnam), with the groups of supporters "La Banda" and "Los Kuervos"; Eastern, Western and numbered Western.

It also has four dressing rooms, eight bathrooms, 27 radio booths, newsroom systems, lighting towers (24 reflectors), medical services and parking for up to 1,600 vehicles. The stadium's field measures 110 m by 75 m.

The south and north side galleries were the names of Korea and Vietnam, respectively, in honor of two Asian countries that suffered from wars during the twentieth century, one of which was the presence of Colombian soldiers fighting (Korea).

A complete renovation with a budget of COP$22,500,000,000. The remodeling of the stadium involved building giant screens, repairing of the athletic track, a new parking lot behind the north gallery, new lighting, dressing rooms for ball-catchers, overall structure restoration, a security camera system, renovation of electrical systems and communications among other improvements.

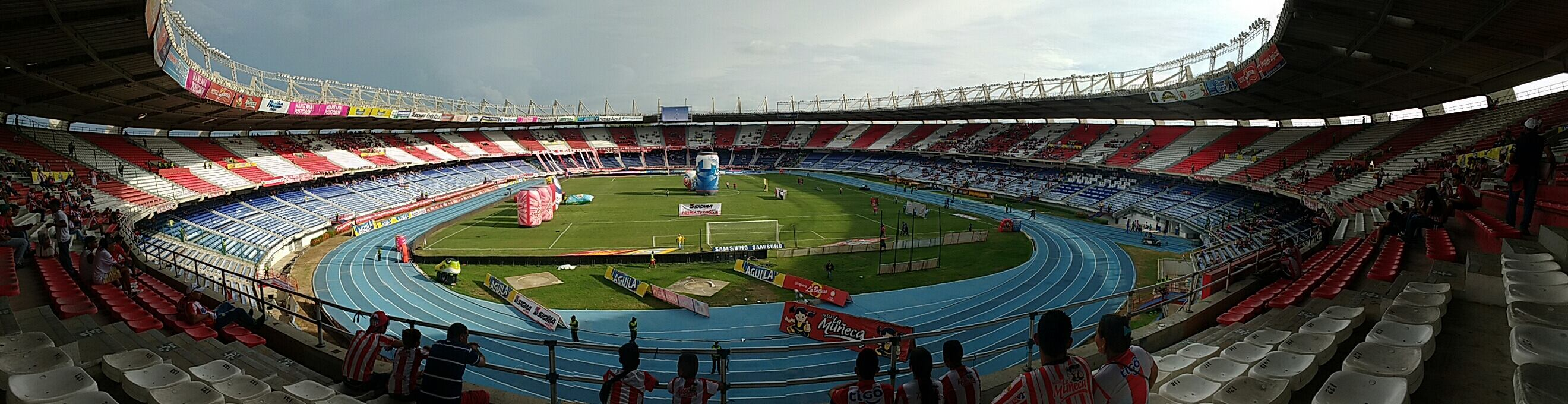

== Location and access routes ==
Estadio Metropolitano is located in the south of the city, heading for Transport Terminal and the municipality of Soledad, near Shopping Centers and Metropolitan Metrocentro. Currently the gallery is constructed in the commercial public sector north side of the stadium (crossing the Avenida Las Torres).

The crossing of the avenues and Circunvalar Murillo is an easily accessible, both avenues have enough availability of transport. At this point, is widening the carriageway of the road from the Avenue Circunvalar cordiality. Other gateways may be Boyacá Avenue and Avenida Las Torres.

In Murillo street Transmetro, the mass transport line is an alternative access at Joaquín Barrios Polo station.
