= Atlético Junior =

Association football club in Colombia

Junior
- Full name: Club Junior FC S.A.
- Nicknames: Los Tiburones (The Sharks); El Equipo Tiburón (The Shark Team); Los Rojiblancos (The Red-and-Whites); Los Quilleros (The Quilleros); Los Reyes de la Costa (The Kings of the Coast); Los Curramberos (The Curramberos); Tu Papá (Your Dad)
- Founded: 7 August 1924; 102 years ago (as Juventud Infantil)
- Ground: Metropolitano Roberto Meléndez
- Capacity: 49,692
- Owner: Fuad Char
- President: Antonio Char
- Head coach: Jorge Bava
- League: Categoría Primera A
- 2025: Primera A, 3rd of 20 (Finalización champions)
- Website: juniorfc.co
Home colours	Away colours	Third colours

Club Junior FC S.A. (Latin American Spanish: [ˈʝunjoɾ]), commonly known as Junior de Barranquilla, by its old name Atlético Junior or simply as Junior, is a Colombian professional football team based in Barranquilla, capital of the department of Atlantico, that currently plays in the Categoría Primera A. Junior is the main Caribbean team in the top flight of Colombian football. In 2026, they were ranked #34 in the CONMEBOL annual club rankings.

The club was founded on 7 August 1924. Known as Los Tiburones (The Sharks), or El Equipo Tiburón (The Shark Team). Junior have won the Colombian professional football championship twelve times (1977, 1980, 1993, 1995, 2004 Finalización, 2010 Apertura, 2011 Finalización, 2018 Finalización, 2019 Apertura, 2023 Finalización, 2025 Finalización, and 2026 Apertura). Some of the most notable players that have played for the club include Heleno de Freitas, Garrincha, Dida, Juan Ramón Verón, Efraín Sánchez, Carlos "El Pibe" Valderrama, Iván Valenciano, Teófilo Gutiérrez, Carlos Bacca, Julio César Uribe, Giovanni Hernández, Sebastián Viera and Luis Díaz.

== History ==
In the early 1920s a team named Juventus came into being at the Colegio Salesiano in the San Roque neighborhood of Barranquilla, made up primarily of Italian immigrants. Soon after its launch the name was changed to the Spanish Juventud, though both translate the same in English: youth. In August 1924 some of the younger members of Juventud along with other young men from San Roque created an offshoot of Juventud: Juventud Infantil.

Around the 1940s (and the club's name was shortened to simply Junior) they became known as one of the country's best clubs. In 1945 the players of Junior were selected to represent Colombia at the South American Championship (now known as the Copa América), finishing a respectable fifth (though losing 7–0 to Uruguay and 9–1 to Argentina along the way). In 1949 they were again selected to represent Colombia (finishing last place) but this time their decision to play would have its consequences.

In 1948 Junior were founder members of División Mayor del Fútbol Profesional Colombiano (commonly known as the Dimayor). Their debut match as a professional outfit came at home on 15 August 1948, against Deportivo Cali, which ended in a 2–0 victory for the home side. Early the following year they were again chosen to play as the de facto Colombia national team. Because of ongoing strife between Adefutbol (the original amateur Colombian football association) and the Dimayor, Junior were threatened with expulsion from the Dimayor if they participated. They went ahead and did so and were initially given a two-year suspension from the league. This was later reduced to one year and they returned to the Dimayor for the 1950 season.

This was the golden age of Colombian football commonly referred to as El Dorado, a time when the Dimayor was a "rebel league" unaffiliated with FIFA and many high-profile players from around the world broke their contracts and came to play. Junior were no exception, picking up players from Brazil, Argentina, Hungary and the Czech Republic in these years. But El Dorado eventually came to an end for Colombian football.

A way ahead surfaced in the mid-1960s when a rift had again developed in Colombian football, this time between Adefutbol and the newly created Federación Colombiana de Fútbol, an organization devoted to developing professional football in the country. Adefutbol was still the official body in the eyes of FIFA and organized the national team in this period and additionally Colombian clubs did not enter the Copa Libertadores. Peace was finally made and the bulk of the amateur team that had attempted to qualify for the England World Cup signed up for Junior, who returned to the Dimayor in 1966. Junior have remained in the top level ever since.

In 1977 Junior won their first Colombian championship, finishing first place in the Apertura. They won further championships in 1980, 1993, 1995, the 2004-II (Finalización), the 2010-I (Apertura), the 2011-II (Finalizacion), the 2018-II (Finalización), the 2019-I (Apertura) and the 2023-II (Finalización). They also won Copa Colombia in 2015 and 2017. Junior have appeared in the Copa Libertadores eighteen times (reaching the semi-finals in 1994), the Copa Sudamericana 8 times (reaching the final in 2018), and the Copa CONMEBOL 1 time.

== Symbols ==
Badge with 11 stars (2025)

Flag of Atlético Junior (2011–2018)

=== Badge ===
The team's badge has a Swiss shaped; proportionally 6 wide by 8 tall, divided into two horizontal stripes. The inferior stripe is divided into nine alternating vertical red and white stripes. The superior part is an horizontal dark blue stripe where the stars are placed. Each of the five-pointed stars represents a league championships the team has won. Superimposed on the vertical bars of red and white, is a horizontal white stripe that reads JUNIOR.

=== Flag ===
Junior's flag is composed of nine horizontal stripes, five red and four white ones which alternate, the superior and the inferior ones are red. Overlapped on top of the strips there is a blue triangle. This triangle occupies all the wide of the flag on its vertical side. The white five-pointed stars are superimposed on the triangle, symbolizing the Colombian championships won.

== Honours ==
=== Domestic ===
- Categoría Primera A
  - Winners (12): 1977, 1980, 1993, 1995, 2004–II, 2010–I, 2011–II, 2018–II, 2019–I, 2023–II, 2025–II, 2026–I
- Copa Colombia
  - Winners (2): 2015, 2017
- Superliga Colombiana
  - Winners (2): 2019, 2020

=== Continental ===
- Copa Sudamericana
  - Runners-up (1): 2018

== Performance in CONMEBOL competitions ==
- Copa Libertadores: 19 appearances

1971: Group stage
1978: Group stage
1981: Group stage
1984: Group stage
1994: Semifinals
1996: Quarterfinals
2000: Round of 16
2001: Round of 16
2005: Round of 16
2010: Preliminary round

2011: Round of 16
2012: Group stage
2017: Third stage
2018: Group stage
2019: Group stage
2020: Group stage
2021: Group stage
2024: Round of 16
2026: Group stage
2027: TBA

- Copa Sudamericana: 10 appearances

2004: Quarterfinals
2015: Second stage
2016: Quarterfinals
2017: Semi-finals
2018: Runners-up

2020: Quarterfinals
2021: Round of 16
2022: Group stage
2023: First stage
2025: Preliminary round

- Copa CONMEBOL: 1 appearance

1992: Quarter-finals

== Players ==
=== Current squad ===
As of 24 September 2026

Note: Flags indicate national team as defined under FIFA eligibility rules; some limited exceptions apply. Players may hold more than one non-FIFA nationality.

No.	Pos.	Nation	Player
1	GK	URU	Mauro Silveira
3	DF	COL	Edwin Herrera
5	DF	COL	Daniel Rivera
6	MF	COL	Dilan Villarreal
7	MF	COL	Harold Rivera
8	FW	COL	Yimmi Chará (captain)
9	FW	PAR	Guillermo Paiva
10	FW	COL	Luis Muriel
12	GK	COL	Jaime Acosta
14	MF	COL	Juan David Ríos
15	FW	COL	José Munive
16	DF	COL	Carlos Pérez
18	FW	COL	Kevin Pérez
19	FW	ARG	Francisco Fydriszewski
20	MF	COL	Jannenson Sarmiento
21	FW	COL	Joel Canchimbo

No.	Pos.	Nation	Player
22	MF	COL	Jesús Rivas
23	DF	COL	Pablo Ortiz (on loan from Baník Ostrava)
24	DF	COL	Jean Pestaña
25	FW	COL	Déiber Caicedo
26	DF	COL	Yeison Suárez
28	MF	COL	Guillermo Celis
29	FW	COL	Teófilo Gutiérrez
30	GK	COL	Jefersson Martínez
38	MF	COL	Andrés Schmalbach
77	FW	COL	Cristian Barrios
80	MF	COL	Fabián Ángel
88	FW	COL	Bryan Castrillón
98	DF	COL	Jermein Peña
99	DF	COL	Fabián Correa
—	DF	COL	Daniel Socarrás

=== Out on loan ===
Note: Flags indicate national team as defined under FIFA eligibility rules; some limited exceptions apply. Players may hold more than one non-FIFA nationality.

No.	Pos.	Nation	Player
—	DF	COL	Carlos Olmos (at Barranquilla)
—	MF	COL	Miguel Agámez (at Barranquilla)
—	MF	COL	Carlos Cantillo (at Jaguares de Córdoba)
—	MF	COL	Diego Mendoza (at Barranquilla)
—	MF	COL	John Fredy Salazar (at Atlético Bucaramanga)

No.	Pos.	Nation	Player
—	MF	COL	Jhon Vélez (at Inter Palmira)
—	FW	COL	Stiwart Acuña (at Envigado)
—	FW	COL	Jesús Díaz (at Independiente Yumbo)
—	FW	COL	Stiven Rodríguez (at Deportivo Cali)

=== World Cup players ===
The following players were chosen to represent their country at the FIFA World Cup while contracted to Junior de Barranquilla.

- (Colombia) Carlos Hoyos (1990)
- (Colombia) Alexis Mendoza (1994)
- (Colombia) José María Pazo (1994)
- (Colombia) Luis Carlos Perea (1994)
- (Colombia) Carlos Valderrama (1994)
- (Colombia) Iván René Valenciano (1994)
- (Colombia) Jorge Bolaño (1998)
- (Peru) Alberto Rodríguez (2018)

=== Club captains ===
- (Colombia) Hermenegildo Segrera (1966–1971)
- (Colombia) Dulio Miranda (1972–1973)
- (Colombia) Gabriel Berdugo (1974–1982)
- (Colombia) Dulio Miranda (1983–1985)
- (Colombia) Alexis Mendoza (1985–1990)
- (Colombia) Gabriel Martínez (1990–1992)
- (Colombia) Carlos Valderrama (1993–1995)
- (Colombia) Jorge Bolaño (1996–1999)
- (Brazil) Marquinho (1999–2004)
- (Colombia) Roberto Peñaloza (2004–2005)
- (Colombia) Hayder Palacio (2005–2007)
- (Colombia) Giovanni Hernández (2008–2012)
- (Uruguay) Sebastián Viera (2012–2014; 2015–2023)
- (Colombia) Macnelly Torres (2015)
- (Colombia) Carlos Bacca (2023–2025)
- (Colombia) Yimmi Chará (2025–2026)
- (Colombia) Fabián Ángel (2026–)

== Personnel ==
=== Coaching staff ===
Position	Staff
Manager	(Uruguay) Jorge Bava
Assistant manager	(Uruguay) Bruno Piano
Assistant manager	(Uruguay) Marcelo Mayor
Fitness coach	(Uruguay) Mauricio Ferraro
Video analyst	(Uruguay) Mauro Di Donna

Source: El Universal

== Notable players ==
=== Most appearances ===
Rank	Player	Appearances
1.	(Uruguay) Sebastián Viera	627
2.	(Colombia) Dulio Miranda	445
3.	(Colombia) Hayder Palacio	432
4.	(Colombia) Alexis Mendoza	417
5.	(Colombia) José María Pazo	392
6.	(Colombia) Gabriel Berdugo	379
7.	(Colombia) Víctor Pacheco	367
8.	(Colombia) Jesús Rubio	363
9.	(Colombia) Luis Grau	341
10.	(Brazil) Othon Dacunha	333

=== Most goals ===
As of 19 December 2024

Rank	Player	Goals
1.	(Colombia) Ivan Valenciano	180
2.	(Colombia) Carlos Bacca	131
3.	(Colombia) Teófilo Gutiérrez	94
4.	(Brazil) Víctor Ephanor	86
5.	(Uruguay) Nelson Silva Pacheco	81
6.	(Colombia) Víctor Pacheco	78
7.	(Colombia) Martín Arzuaga	70
8.	(Colombia) Vladimir Hernández	65
9.	(Colombia) Orlando Ballesteros	56
10.	(Brazil) Marcos Cardoso	55

== Historic players ==
- (Argentina) Carlos Babington
- (Argentina) Edgardo Bauza
- (Argentina) Juan Carlos Delménico
- (Argentina) Carlos Ischia
- (Argentina) Omar Pérez
- (Argentina) Walter Ribonetto
- (Argentina) Fabián Sambueza
- (Argentina) Juan Ramón Verón
- (Brazil) Paulo César Caju
- (Brazil) Cassiano
- (Brazil) Dida
- (Brazil) Garrincha
- (Brazil) Heleno de Freitas
- (Brazil) Quarentinha
- (Brazil) Víctor Ephanor
- (Chile) Cristián Montecinos
- (Colombia) José Amaya
- (Colombia) Alfredo Arango
- (Colombia) Martín Arzuaga
- (Colombia) Carlos Bacca
- (Colombia) Orlando Ballesteros
- (Colombia) Gabriel Berdugo
- (Colombia) Jorge Bolaño
- (Colombia) Miguel Ángel Borja
- (Colombia) Déiber Caicedo
- (Colombia) Víctor Campaz
- (Colombia) Víctor Cantillo
- (Colombia) Yimmi Chará
- (Colombia) José Luis Chunga
- (Colombia) Víctor Cortés
- (Colombia) Gustavo Cuéllar
- (Colombia) Luis Díaz
- (Colombia) José Enamorado
- (Colombia) Fernando Fiorillo
- (Colombia) Gabriel Fuentes
- (Colombia) Miguel Ángel Guerrero
- (Colombia) Teófilo Gutiérrez
- (Colombia) Giovanni Hernández
- (Colombia) Vladimir Hernández
- (Colombia) William Knight
- (Colombia) Homer Martínez
- (Colombia) Roberto Meléndez
- (Colombia) Alexis Mendoza
- (Colombia) Dulio Miranda
- (Colombia) Didier Moreno
- (Colombia) Luis Muriel
- (Colombia) Luis Narváez
- (Colombia) Víctor Pacheco
- (Colombia) Hayder Palacio
- (Colombia) José María Pazo
- (Colombia) Rafael Perez
- (Colombia) Marlon Piedrahita
- (Colombia) Efraín "El Caimán" Sánchez
- (Colombia) Iván Valenciano
- (Colombia) Carlos "El Pibe" Valderrama
- (Colombia) Alex "Didi" Valderrama
- (Hungary) Béla Sárosi
- (Panama) Román Torres
- (Peru) Julio César Uribe
- (Uruguay) Lorenzo Carrabs
- (Uruguay) Julio Comesaña
- (Uruguay) Santiago Mele
- (Uruguay) Héctor Gerardo Méndez
- (Uruguay) Nelson Silva Pacheco
- (Uruguay) Mauro Silveira
- (Uruguay) Sebastián Viera
- (Venezuela) Luis Daniel "Cariaco" González

== International players ==
The following players, despite not having been able to establish themselves as idols, had a stage as internationals with their national teams.

- (Argentina) Daniel Carnevali
- (Argentina) Santiago Santamaría
- (Colombia) Luis Carlos Perea
- (Colombia) René Higuita
- (Colombia) Carlos Hoyos
- (Colombia) Juan Fernando Quintero
- (Chile) Matías Fernández
- (Chile) Nelson Tapia
- (Panama) Román Torres
- (Peru) Alberto Rodríguez

== Affiliated clubs ==
- (Colombia) Barranquilla - Currently competing in Categoría Primera B.
