= Samuel Velásquez =

Colombian footballer (born 2003)

Personal information
- Full name: Samuel Velásquez Uribe
- Date of birth: 29 May 2003 (age 23)
- Place of birth: Medellín, Colombia (Note: A 2023 profile in El Colombiano gives his birthplace as Medellín, while later reports in the same newspaper give it as Rionegro.)
- Position: Left-back

Team information
- Current team: Atlético Nacional
- Number: 33

Youth career
- Atlético Nacional
- Estudiantil
- 2021–2022: Atlético Nacional

Senior career*
Years	Team	Apps	(Gls)
2022–	Atlético Nacional	50	(2)
2025	→ Deportes Tolima (loan)	43	(1)

International career^{‡}
2024	Colombia U23	3	(0)
2023–	Colombia	5	(1)
- * Club domestic league appearances and goals as of 19 September 2026 ‡ National team caps and goals as of 6 October 2026

Samuel Velásquez Uribe (born 29 May 2003) is a Colombian professional footballer who plays as a left-back for Categoría Primera A club Atlético Nacional and the Colombia national team.

A product of Atlético Nacional's youth system, Velásquez won the Primera C with the club's under-20 side in 2021 and made his first-team debut in 2023. With Nacional he won the 2023 Superliga Colombiana, the Copa Colombia in 2023 and 2024, and the 2024 Finalización league title. He spent the 2025 season on loan at Deportes Tolima, with whom he finished as runner-up in the 2025 Finalización, before returning to Nacional in 2026.

At youth level, Velásquez represented Colombia at the 2024 CONMEBOL Pre-Olympic Tournament. He made his first appearances for the senior team in December 2023 and was recalled to the squad in September 2026.

== Early life ==
Velásquez was born on 29 May 2003. He joined the youth academy of Atlético Nacional at the age of four, but was released at ten; after trials with Independiente Medellín and Estudiantil, he chose Estudiantil, where he stayed until the under-17 level. His coach at Estudiantil, Jesús Ramírez, described him as disciplined, technically sound and intelligent. He also played for the Antioquia regional teams at youth level, winning a national title with the department's under-23 side, before returning to Nacional's under-20 team in 2021, where he won the Primera C under coach Diego Mazo.

== Club career ==
=== Atlético Nacional ===
Velásquez was first called up to Nacional's senior squad for a friendly against Alianza Lima, in which he came on in the second half and scored. He made his competitive debut on 26 January 2023, the opening day of the 2023 Apertura, as a 79th-minute substitute in a 1–0 home win over Once Caldas. He scored his first professional goal on 30 September 2023, opening the scoring in a 3–0 league win over Envigado and setting up the third goal for Eric Ramírez. On 23 November he started the second leg of the 2023 Copa Colombia final against Millonarios, which finished 1–1 before Nacional won the title 5–4 on penalties.

In 2024 Velásquez competed for the left-back position with Álvaro Angulo and Andrés Salazar, and under coach Efraín Juárez he returned to the starting line-up in October when Angulo was injured, playing in the first leg of the 2024 Copa Colombia quarter-final against Jaguares. Nacional went on to win both the Copa Colombia and the Finalización that December, taking his haul with the club to four titles.

=== Loan to Deportes Tolima ===
On 22 January 2025, Velásquez joined Deportes Tolima on a one-year loan with an option to buy, under coach Ismael Rescalvo. He made his debut in a goalless draw away to Santa Fe on 31 January, and played in both legs of Tolima's elimination by Melgar in the second qualifying stage of the 2025 Copa Libertadores in February. His only goal for Tolima came on 24 August 2025, a left-footed finish in the 57th minute that gave them a 1–0 win away to Once Caldas. Tolima reached the final of the Finalización, where they lost 4–0 on aggregate to Junior in December 2025. Tolima did not take up the option to buy him, and he returned to Nacional after 47 appearances for the club.

=== Return to Nacional ===
Back at Nacional in 2026, Velásquez scored the third goal in stoppage time of a 3–0 win over Deportivo Cali in the round of 16 of the 2026 Copa Colombia on 7 September.

== International career ==
=== Youth ===
Velásquez was named in Héctor Cárdenas's Colombia squad for the 2024 CONMEBOL Pre-Olympic Tournament in Venezuela. He came on as a first-half substitute against Ecuador and started against Brazil and Venezuela, as Colombia lost all four of their group matches.

=== Senior ===
Néstor Lorenzo first called Velásquez up to the senior squad in December 2023 for two friendlies in the United States. He made his first appearance on 10 December, playing the full match at left-back in a 1–0 win over Venezuela's under-23 side in Fort Lauderdale. Six days later he started against Mexico at the Los Angeles Memorial Coliseum, cutting the ball back for Andrés Reyes to equalise at 2–2 in a 3–2 win. On 17 September 2026 Lorenzo recalled him for friendlies against Mexico, Paraguay and Peru, his first call-up since 2023.

== Style of play ==
Velásquez is a left-footed full-back who began his career as a number 10 before converting to left-back. He combines technique with pace and physical intensity despite his small stature, and he is known more for his creative passing than for his crossing. His style has been compared with that of former Nacional left-back Diego León Osorio, while he has named Andy Robertson as the player he models his game on.

== Career statistics ==
=== Club ===
As of match played 16 September 2026

Appearances and goals by club, season and competition
Club	Season	League			Cup (Note: Appearances in the Copa Colombia)		Continental (Note: Appearances in the Copa Libertadores)		Total	
Club	Season	Division	Apps	Goals	Apps	Goals	Apps	Goals	Apps	Goals
Atlético Nacional	2023	Categoría Primera A	19	2	5	0	0	0	24	2
Atlético Nacional	2024	Categoría Primera A	16	0	4	0	1	0	21	0
Atlético Nacional	2026	Categoría Primera A	20	0	3	1	—		23	1
Atlético Nacional	Total		55	2	12	1	1	0	68	3
Deportes Tolima (loan)	2025	Categoría Primera A	43	1	2	0	2	0	47	1
Career total			98	3	14	1	3	0	115	4

=== International ===
As of match played 6 October 2026

Appearances and goals by national team and year
National team	Year	Apps	Goals
Colombia	2023	2	0
Colombia	2024	0	0
Colombia	2025	0	0
Colombia	2026	3	1
Total		5	1

Scores and results list Colombia's goal tally first, score column indicates score after each Velásquez goal.

List of international goals scored by Samuel Velásquez
No.	Date	Venue	Opponent	Score	Result	Competition
1.	6 October 2026	Hard Rock Stadium, Miami, United States	Peru	1–0	2–0	Friendly

== Honours ==
Atlético Nacional

- Categoría Primera A: 2024 Finalización
- Copa Colombia: 2023, 2024
- Superliga Colombiana: 2023

Deportes Tolima

- Categoría Primera A runner-up: 2025 Finalización
