= Colombia national football team =

Men's association football team

Colombia
- Nickname(s): Los Cafeteros (The Coffee Growers); La Tricolor (The Tricolour); La Sele (The Sele)
- Association: Federación Colombiana de Fútbol (FCF)
- Confederation: CONMEBOL (South America)
- Head coach: Néstor Lorenzo
- Captain: Davinson Sánchez
- Most caps: James Rodríguez (131)
- Top scorer: Radamel Falcao (36)
- Home stadium: Estadio Metropolitano Roberto Meléndez
- FIFA code: COL
First colours	Second colours

FIFA ranking
- Current: 10 ▲1 (18 November 2026)
- Highest: 3 (July–August 2013, September 2014 – March 2015, June–August 2016)
- Lowest: 54 (June 2011)

First international
- Colombia 4–1 Costa Rica (Barranquilla, Colombia; 17 February 1926)

Biggest win
- Bahrain 0–6 Colombia (Riffa, Bahrain; 26 March 2015)

Biggest defeat
- Brazil 9–0 Colombia (Lima, Peru; 24 March 1957)

World Cup
- Appearances: 7 (first in 1962)
- Best result: Quarter-finals (2014)

Copa América
- Appearances: 24 (first in 1945)
- Best result: Champions (2001)

CONCACAF Gold Cup
- Appearances: 3 (first in 2000)
- Best result: Runners-up (2000)

Confederations Cup
- Appearances: 1 (first in 2003)
- Best result: Fourth place (2003)
Medal record
Copa América
Gold medal – first place	2001 Colombia	Team
Silver medal – second place	1975 South America	Team
Silver medal – second place	2024 United States	Team
Bronze medal – third place	1987 Argentina	Team
Bronze medal – third place	1993 Ecuador	Team
Bronze medal – third place	1995 Uruguay	Team
Bronze medal – third place	2016 United States	Team
Bronze medal – third place	2021 Brazil	Team
CONCACAF Gold Cup
Silver medal – second place	2000 United States	Team
Central American and Caribbean Games
Gold medal – first place	1946 Barranquilla	Team
Bronze medal – third place	1938 Panama City	Team

The Colombia national football team (Spanish: Selección de fútbol de Colombia), nicknamed Los Cafeteros, represents Colombia in men's international association football. It is administered by the Colombian Football Federation (Spanish: Federación Colombiana de Fútbol), the governing body for football in Colombia. The federation has been affiliated with FIFA and CONMEBOL since 1936.

Colombia have appeared at seven FIFA World Cups, first qualifying for the 1962 FIFA World Cup. Their best performance came at the 2014 FIFA World Cup, where they reached the quarter-finals for the first time; James Rodríguez won the Golden Boot after scoring six goals. Colombia have also reached the knockout stage at the 1990, 2018 and 2026 tournaments. Colombia won the 2001 Copa América as hosts, winning all six matches without conceding a goal. The team has also finished as runners-up in 1975 and 2024, and third in 1987, 1993, 1995, 2016 and 2021.

== History ==
=== Early history (1900–1946) ===
The origins of football in Colombia are disputed, as no single city or date is universally accepted. Most accounts place the first organised matches in the early 20th century on the Caribbean coast, particularly around Barranquilla and Santa Marta, where British railway workers on the Puerto Colombia line and English sailors introduced association football to local communities. Bogotá and Pasto have also laid claim to the sport's introduction, and among the earliest documented fixtures is an October 1909 friendly in Santa Marta between a United Fruit Company works team fielding English players and a side of local labourers. One documented account places the first match on 6 August 1904, when executives and workers of The Colombia Railways Company played in Barranquilla, following informal games organised by employees since around 1900.

Colombian football's first governing body was founded in Barranquilla on 12 October 1924 as the Liga de Football del Atlántico, gaining legal recognition from the national government by resolution in 1927. Reconstituted as the Asociación Colombiana de Fútbol, it joined both FIFA and CONMEBOL in 1936, and adopted its present name, the Colombian Football Federation, upon receiving definitive FIFA recognition in 1971. Colombia's first recorded international match came on 17 February 1926, when a side representing the Atlantic coast and playing as Selección Atlántico defeated Costa Rica 4–1 at the Estadio Moderno Julio Torres in Barranquilla.

==== First representative teams (1937–1938) ====
In 1937, Colombia fielded a representative side at the Juegos del IV Centenario de Cali, a multi-sport event marking the 400th anniversary of Cali's founding, and played four matches against Mexico, Argentina, Ecuador and Cuba at the newly inaugurated Estadio Olímpico Pascual Guerrero. Despite FIFA membership, Colombia withdrew from the 1938 FIFA World Cup and instead entered the 1938 Central American and Caribbean Games in Panama City, where the national team played its first tournament matches. The squad was drawn in its entirety from Club Juventud Bogotana, a Bogotá side founded the previous year that lent all of its players to the selection and, on returning home, was reconstituted as the Club Municipal de Deportes and ultimately became Millonarios.

Colombia opened with a 3–1 defeat to Mexico on 10 February, then recorded a maiden tournament victory on 14 February by beating hosts Panama 4–2. Narrow losses to Costa Rica (1–2) and Venezuela (1–2) were offset by a 3–2 win over El Salvador, and Colombia beat the same opponents 2–1 in the third-place play-off on 25 February to claim the bronze medal. The side remained together on returning to Bogotá, competing at the 1938 Bolivarian Games in August, where it defeated Venezuela 2–0 but lost to Peru, Ecuador and Bolivia.

==== First CONMEBOL and regional tournaments (1945–1946) ====
Colombia made their Copa América debut at the 1945 tournament in Chile, their first appearance in an official CONMEBOL competition. With no professional league or national selection system in place, the squad was built almost entirely around Junior de Barranquilla, then one of the strongest amateur sides on the Caribbean coast, and every player was registered simply as an amateur. Roberto Meléndez acted as player-manager, appearing on the wing while also selecting the side. Drawn against Brazil, Uruguay, Argentina, Chile, Ecuador and Bolivia, Colombia lost their first four matches but finished with a 3–1 win over Ecuador and a 3–3 draw with Bolivia to place fifth of seven.

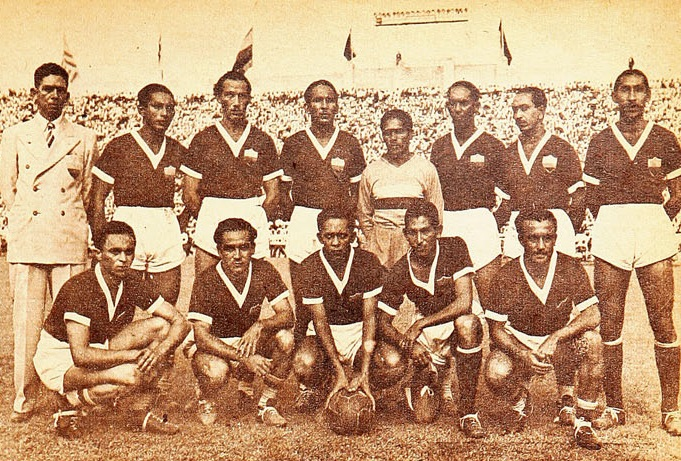
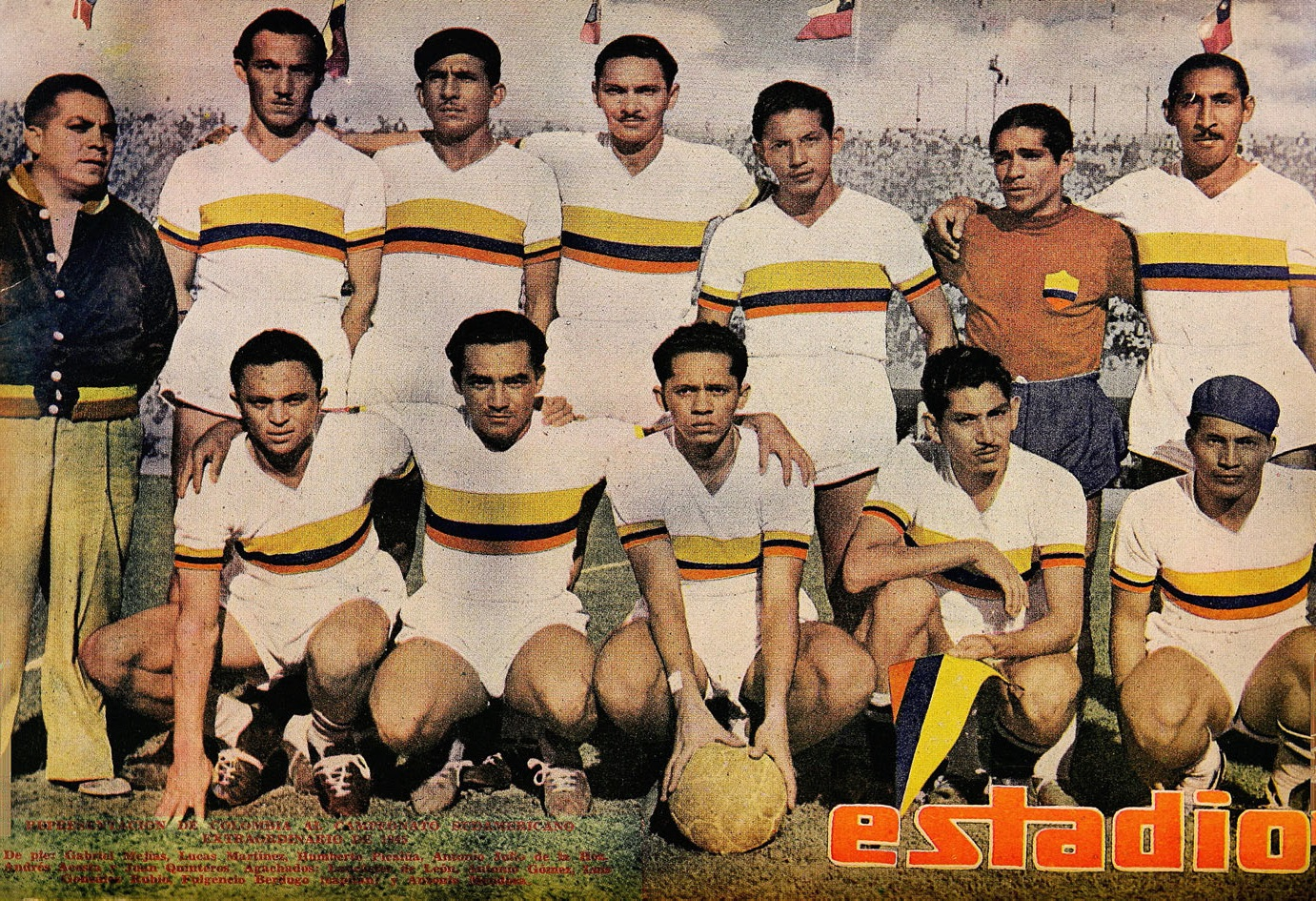
Colombia during its first South American Championship appearance, at the 1945 South American Championship in Chile.

Colombia withdrew from the 1946 South American Championship but won their first international title later that year at the football tournament of the 1946 Central American and Caribbean Games, staged in Barranquilla in December. After Cuba and Mexico withdrew, judging that the strength of the remaining entrants did not justify the cost of sending teams, the competition was played as a single round-robin; Colombia won all six matches, scoring 20 goals and conceding seven, defeating Curaçao, Venezuela, Guatemala, Puerto Rico, Costa Rica and Panama. The team was coached by Peruvian manager José Arana Cruz, one of the first foreign coaches in the Colombia setup, whose tenure coincided with the country's first major international success.

=== El Dorado and international isolation (1948–1957) ===
Colombian football turned professional in 1948 with the founding of the División Mayor del Fútbol Colombiano (DIMAYOR), a Bogotá-based body which organised a ten-club national championship in competition with Adefútbol, the FIFA-affiliated amateur association based in Barranquilla. When Adefútbol refused to sanction the breakaway, FIFA disaffiliated DIMAYOR, and the resulting suspension barred both Colombian clubs and the national team from all international competition for the period from 1949 to 1954 that became known as El Dorado.

Freed from the obligation to pay transfer fees, and coinciding with a players' strike that had halted the Argentine championship, Colombian clubs recruited aggressively abroad; by the end of 1949 some 109 foreign players, 57 of them Argentine, had joined the league. Millonarios assembled the side known as the Ballet Azul, built around Argentines Adolfo Pedernera, Alfredo Di Stéfano and Néstor Rossi, which won four championships in five seasons and beat Real Madrid 4–2 in Madrid on 30 March 1952 to win the Spanish club's golden jubilee tournament. The exodus prompted complaints of piracy from the Argentine federation, and FIFA formally expelled Colombia on 25 October 1951. Days later, at the CONMEBOL congress in Peru, DIMAYOR signed the Pacto de Lima, agreeing that all foreign players signed during the period would return to their original clubs by 15 October 1954 in exchange for readmission. The sanction was lifted in October 1954, ending an era in which the national team played no official fixtures at all despite the domestic league arguably being the strongest in the world.

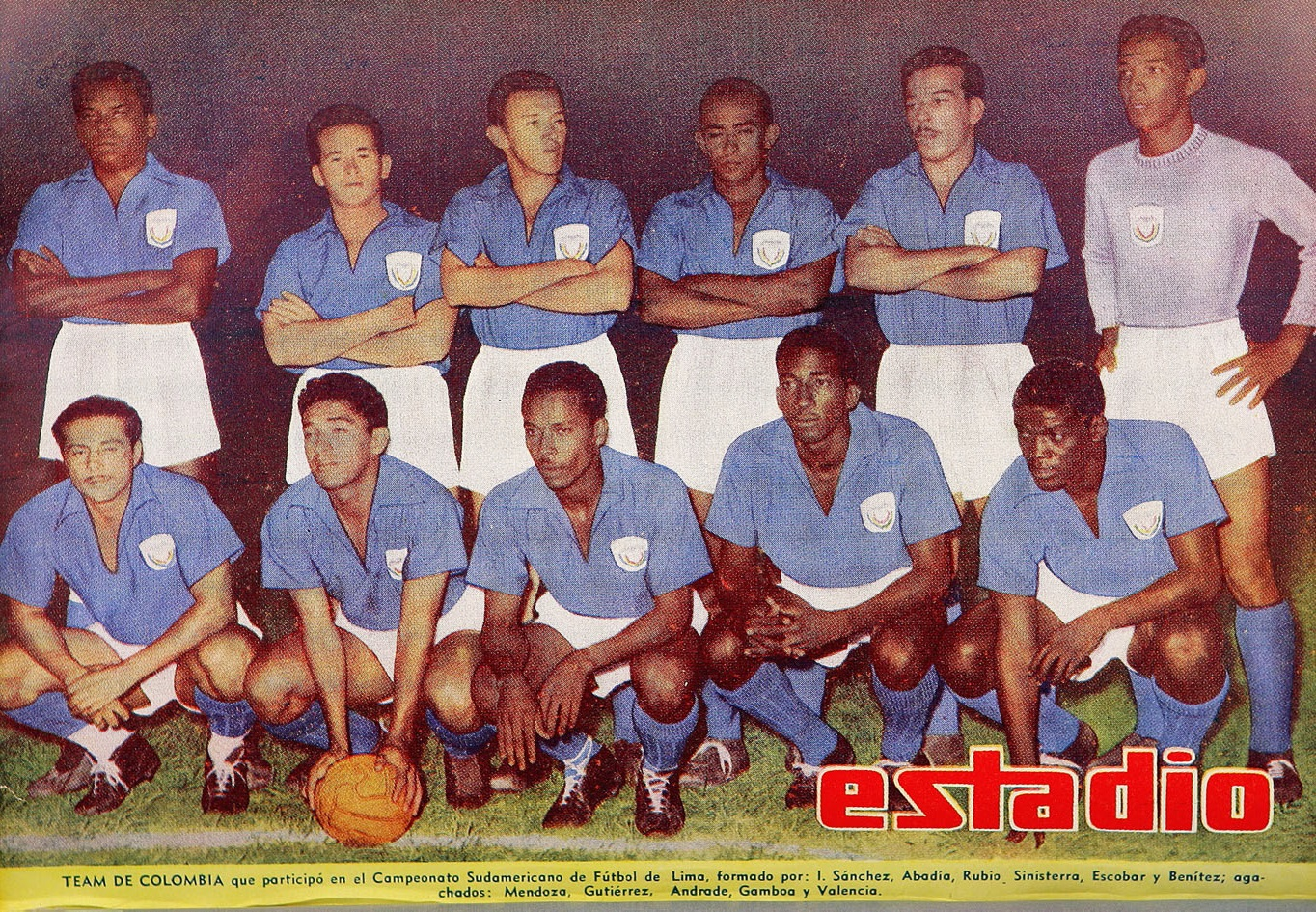
Colombia at the 1957 South American Championship, its first South American Championship appearance after the national team's international isolation

Colombia returned to CONMEBOL competition at the 1957 South American Championship in Lima, a seven-team round-robin from which Bolivia and Paraguay had withdrawn, and finished fifth with four points from six matches under coach Pedro López. Heavy defeats to Argentina (2–8) on 13 March and Brazil (0–9) on 24 March left the side with ten goals scored and 25 conceded, but two victories provided encouragement. On 17 March, Carlos Arango scored in the 28th minute to beat reigning champions Uruguay 1–0 before 50,000 spectators at the Estadio Nacional, and the campaign closed on 1 April with a 4–1 win over Ecuador in which Delio Gamboa scored twice. Arango and Gamboa finished as Colombia's joint top scorers with three goals each, while goalkeeper Efraín Sánchez and defender Francisco Zuluaga started every match after the opening fixture.

=== First World Cup appearance (1958–1962) ===
In 1962 World Cup qualifying, Colombia met Peru over two legs under Argentine manager Pedernera, who had remained in the country after El Dorado as a coach. A 1–0 win in Bogotá on 30 April 1961 was followed by a 1–1 draw in Lima a week later, and Colombia advanced to the 1962 FIFA World Cup in Chile.

Drawn in Group 1 with Uruguay, the Soviet Union and Yugoslavia, Colombia lost their opening match to Uruguay 2–1 on 30 May and were beaten 5–0 by Yugoslavia on 7 June, finishing bottom of the group with a single point from three games and five goals scored against eleven conceded. Their remaining fixture, however, produced one of the tournament's defining results. Facing the reigning European champions at the Estadio Carlos Dittborn in Arica on 3 June before a crowd of 8,040, with Brazilian referee João Filho officiating, Colombia trailed 3–0 inside eleven minutes to goals from Valentin Ivanov in the eighth and eleventh minutes either side of an Igor Chislenko strike in the tenth. Germán Aceros reduced the deficit in the 21st minute, but Viktor Ponedelnik restored a three-goal lead in the 56th.

With twenty minutes remaining, Marcos Coll scored directly from a corner in the 68th minute, the ball creeping in at the near post past Lev Yashin — the only goal scored direct from a corner in World Cup history, and conceded by a goalkeeper then widely regarded as the world's finest. Antonio Rada struck in the 72nd minute and Marino Klinger completed the recovery late on to secure a 4–4 draw. (Note: Sources differ on the timing of Klinger's goal, variously given as the 76th and the 86th minute.) The match is remembered as the moment the national team announced itself internationally, despite the group-stage exit, and Colombia would not qualify for another World Cup for 28 years.

=== Isolation and the qualification drought (1963–1974) ===
The 1962 FIFA World Cup proved a false dawn. At the 1963 South American Championship in Bolivia, Colombia lost five of six matches and finished last of the seven competing nations with a single point, conceding nineteen goals in the thin air of La Paz and Cochabamba.

Three successive qualifying campaigns followed the same pattern of narrow competence undone by a single heavy defeat. Colombia were beaten twice by Ecuador and thrashed 7–2 by Chile in the 1966 preliminaries, recovering only to win the return 2–0 once elimination was assured. Drawn with Brazil for Mexico 1970, they took a point from six matches against the eventual world champions and Paraguay combined, losing 6–2 in Rio de Janeiro.

The 1974 campaign was the cruellest of the three. Under the Yugoslav coach Toza Veselinović, Colombia went unbeaten across four matches, drawing three and winning in Montevideo 1–0 through Willington Ortiz on 5 July 1973 — a result long remembered in Colombia as a rare reverse for Uruguay at home. (Note: Ortiz himself, in a memoir of his international career, dated the Montevideo goal to June 1975; contemporaneous fixture lists place the match in the 1974 qualifying tournament on 5 July 1973.) Colombia finished level with Uruguay on five points but were eliminated on goal difference.

=== The Copa América final (1975) ===
The renamed and decentralised 1975 Copa América produced Colombia's first deep run in a continental tournament. Coached by Efraín Sánchez, the goalkeeper of the 1962 squad, Colombia won all four group matches against Paraguay and Ecuador, scoring seven and conceding one. In the semi-final they overwhelmed the defending champions Uruguay 3–0 at the Estadio El Campín through Edgar Angulo, Ortiz and Ernesto Díaz; the return at the Estadio Centenario finished 1–0 to Uruguay, whose Fernando Morena converted an early penalty before being sent off and whose team missed two further spot-kicks. With the sides level on points, Colombia advanced on goal difference.

The final against Peru was the first in the competition's history to be decided over multiple legs. Ponciano Castro settled the opening match in Bogotá on 16 October with a long-range strike; Peru answered a week later at the Estadio Nacional in Lima, Juan Carlos Oblitas and Oswaldo Ramírez scoring inside the first half for a 2–0 win that levelled the tie on points and forced a decider on neutral ground. At the Estadio Olímpico in Caracas on 28 October, Hugo Sotil — flown in from Barcelona — scored the only goal before 30,000 spectators, and Peru claimed a second continental title. Ernesto Díaz finished as the tournament's joint leading scorer with four goals, a total that still ranks among the highest by a Colombian at the Copa América.

=== Stagnation and a forfeited World Cup (1976–1986) ===
Runners-up status brought no lasting improvement. Colombia failed to win any of their four matches in the 1978 qualifiers, managing one goal across the group and losing 6–0 in Rio de Janeiro. At the 1979 Copa América they again finished level on points with Chile after beating them 1–0 in Bogotá and putting four past Venezuela, only to be eliminated on goal difference following a 2–0 defeat in Santiago. The 1982 campaign, overseen by the Argentine Carlos Bilardo, yielded two points from four matches and no victories, Hernán Darío Herrera scoring three of Colombia's four goals. A second-place group finish behind Peru ended the 1983 Copa América campaign.

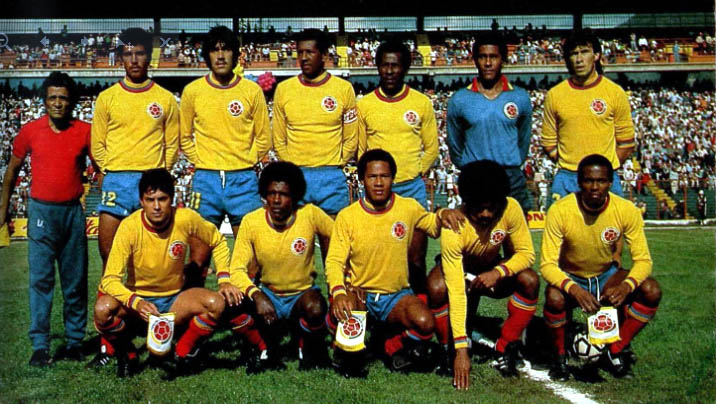
The Colombia national team in 1985

Overshadowing the decade was the collapse of Colombia's own World Cup. Awarded hosting rights to the 1986 FIFA World Cup in 1974, the country found FIFA's stadium, broadcasting and infrastructure requirements beyond its means as the economy contracted and internal violence escalated. In a televised address on 25 October 1982, President Belisario Betancur renounced the tournament, declaring that the golden rule "that the World Cup should serve Colombia, and not Colombia the World Cup multinational" had not been honoured and that the country had "no time to attend to the extravagances of FIFA and its partners". No nation had previously surrendered a World Cup already granted to it; FIFA reassigned the 1986 finals to Mexico. Construction already under way left a permanent legacy in the Estadio Metropolitano Roberto Meléndez in Barranquilla, later adopted as the national team's home ground.

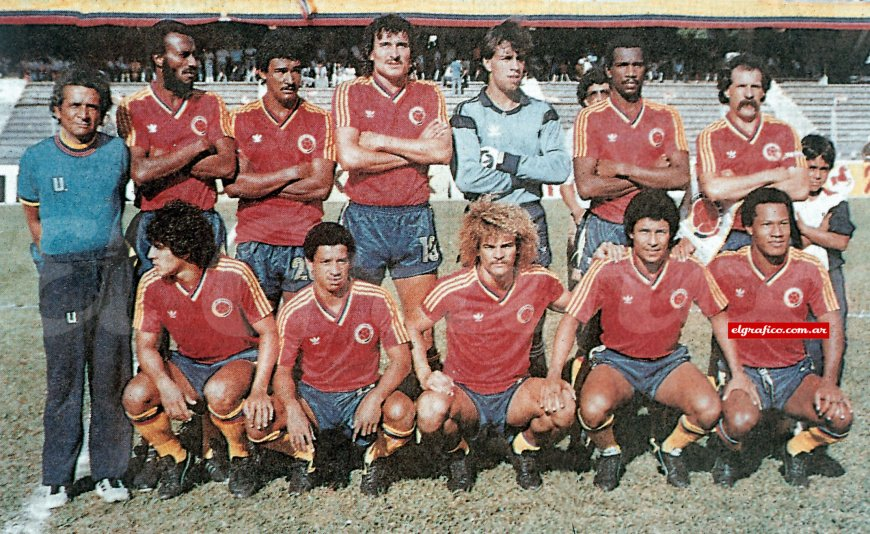
Colombia before its 1986 FIFA World Cup qualifying play-off against Paraguay in October 1985

Colombia nonetheless entered the qualifying tournament for the finals they had abandoned, finishing third in a group won by Argentina and reaching the CONMEBOL play-offs. A 3–0 defeat in Asunción on 27 October 1985, Ramón Hicks, Romerito and Roberto Cabañas scoring, left the tie beyond recovery; goals from Sergio Angulo and Ortiz gave Colombia a 2–1 win in Cali a week later before a crowd of only 6,000, and Paraguay progressed 4–2 on aggregate.

=== Maturana, narco-fútbol and the return to the World Cup (1987–1989) ===
The transformation began in May 1987, when the federation appointed Francisco Maturana — a former Once Caldas and Atlético Nacional coach then in charge of the youth setup — to the senior side. Maturana discarded the reactive schemes of his predecessors for a possession-based approach built on short passing, zonal marking and a crowded midfield, and licensed René Higuita to operate far from his goal as a sweeper-keeper — a style Colombian supporters came to call toque-toque.

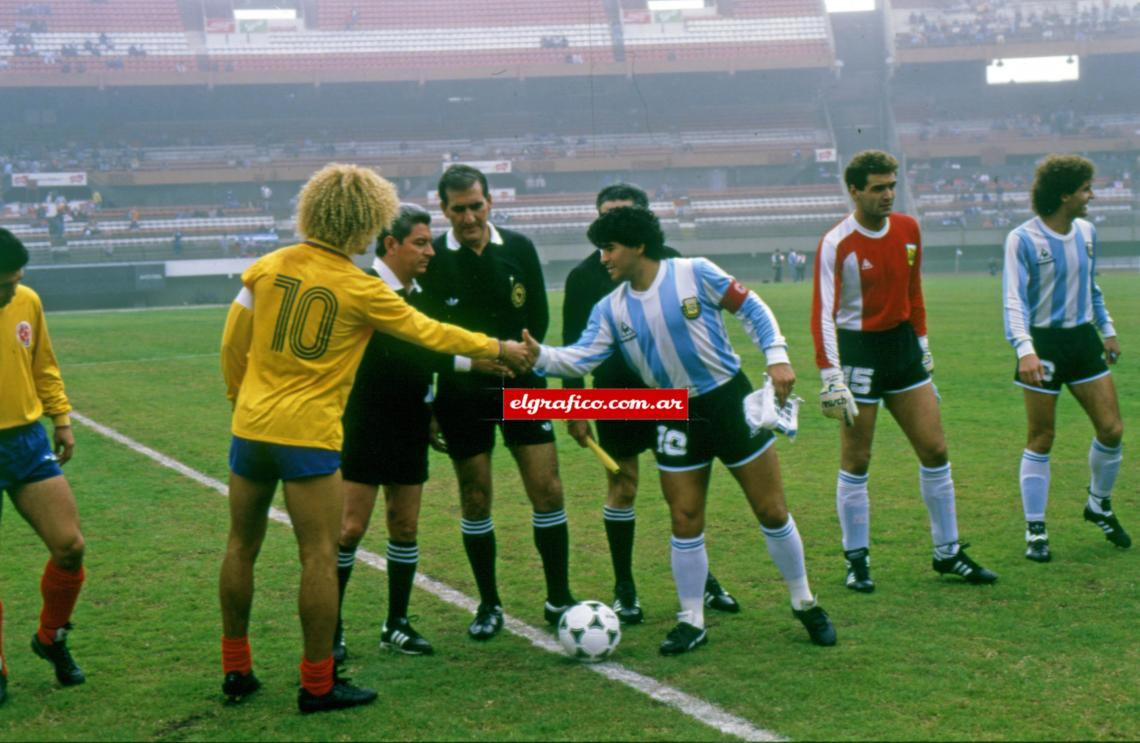
Colombia and Argentina captains Carlos Valderrama and Diego Maradona before the third-place match at the 1987 Copa América

His first tournament brought immediate reward. Colombia went through the group stage of the 1987 Copa América unbeaten, lost 2–1 to Chile in the semi-final, then beat the hosts Argentina 2–1 at the Monumental on 11 July through Gabriel Jaime Gómez and John Jairo Galeano, Claudio Caniggia replying late before 15,000 spectators. Arnoldo Iguarán finished as the tournament's leading scorer with four goals.

The revival coincided with an influx of narcotics money into the domestic game. Atlético Nacional, funded through the Medellín Cartel and its leader Pablo Escobar, retained Colombian internationals who would otherwise have moved abroad and recruited foreign players the league could not previously afford; Maturana, who managed the club from 1987 to 1990, later acknowledged that "the introduction of drug money into soccer allowed us to bring in great foreign players. It also kept our best players from leaving. Our level of play took off." On 31 May 1989 Nacional, fielding Higuita, Andrés Escobar, Leonel Álvarez and Albeiro Usuriaga, beat Olimpia 5–4 on penalties at El Campín to become the first Colombian club to win the Copa Libertadores, supplying Maturana with a ready-made international spine.

Colombia were eliminated in the group stage of the 1989 Copa América in Brazil, a 1–0 loss to Paraguay proving decisive despite a goalless draw with the eventual champions. The World Cup qualifiers opened a fortnight later. Iguarán scored twice in a 2–0 win over Ecuador in Barranquilla on 20 August, and after a 2–1 defeat in Asunción — conceded to a stoppage-time penalty from the debutant José Luis Chilavert — and a goalless draw in Guayaquil, Colombia beat Paraguay 2–1 in Barranquilla through Iguarán and Rubén Hernández. (Note: Sources differ on the timing of Iguarán's goal in Asunción, variously given as the 80th, 86th or 87th minute.) Ecuador's 3–1 win over Paraguay on 24 September confirmed Colombia as group winners and sent them to an intercontinental play-off.

Against Israel, winners of the Oceania group, Usuriaga scored the only goal of the first leg in Barranquilla on 15 October before 65,000 spectators. A goalless draw at the Ramat Gan Stadium in Tel Aviv on 30 October 1989 completed a 1–0 aggregate victory and returned Colombia to the World Cup after an absence of 28 years.

=== World Cup return and the golden generation (1990–1994) ===
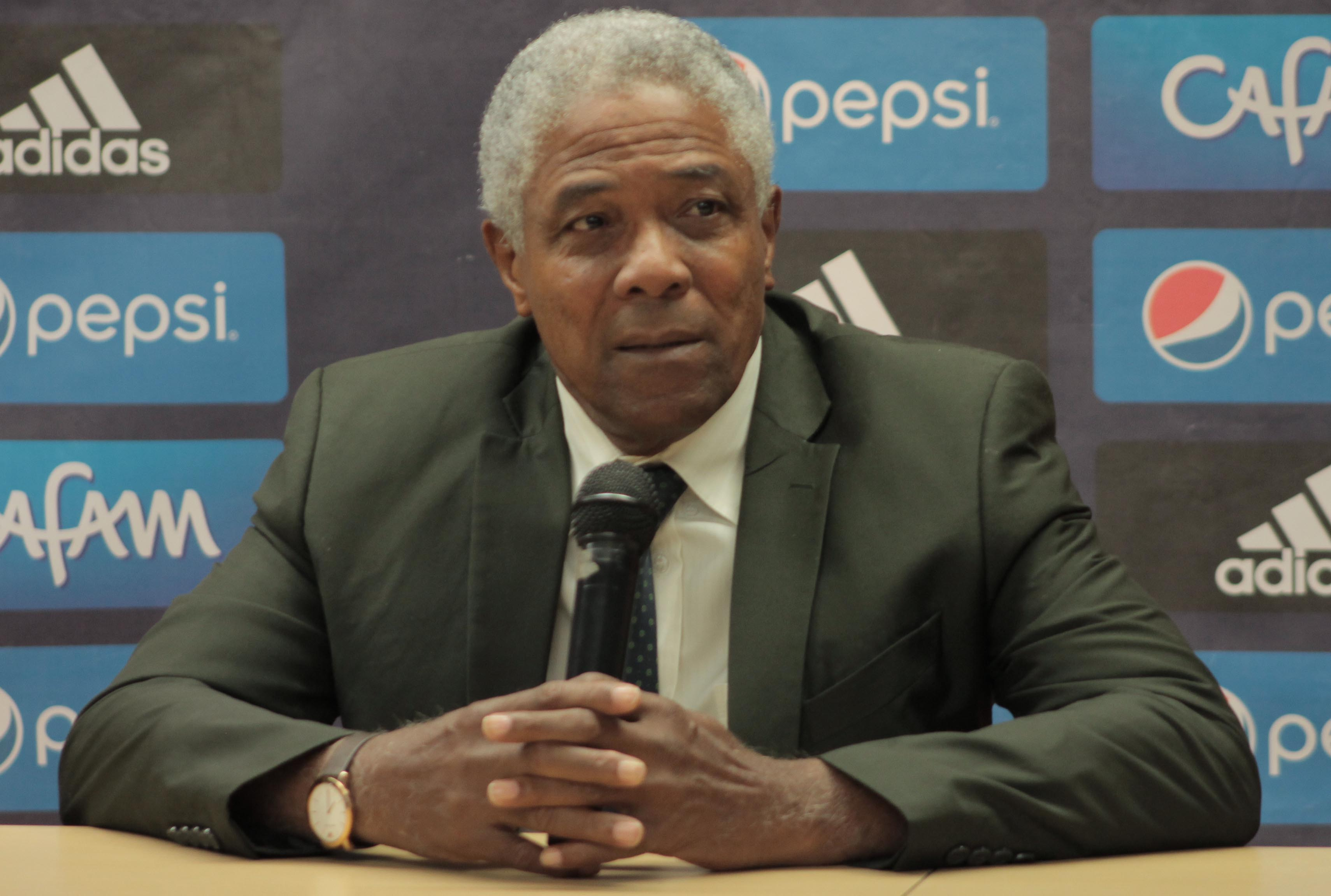
Francisco Maturana led Colombia at the 1990 FIFA World Cup and returned to qualify the team for the 1994 FIFA World Cup

At the 1990 FIFA World Cup, Colombia were drawn in Group D with Yugoslavia, the United Arab Emirates and West Germany. They opened at the Stadio Renato Dall'Ara in Bologna on 9 June with a laboured 2–0 win over the United Arab Emirates, Bernardo Redín heading in Leonel Álvarez's pass in the 50th minute and Carlos Valderrama driving home from twenty yards five minutes from time — Colombia's first victory at a World Cup finals.

A 1–0 defeat by Yugoslavia left qualification resting on the final group match against West Germany in Milan on 19 June. Pierre Littbarski put the eventual world champions ahead in the 88th minute; with the last attack of the match, Freddy Rincón collected a through-ball from Valderrama and beat Bodo Illgner to secure the 1–1 draw and the point Colombia needed. (Note: Contemporaneous match reports and databases variously time Rincón's equaliser at the 90th, 92nd or 93rd minute of a match in which West Germany had scored in the 88th.) Colombia finished third in Group D and advanced to the round of 16, their first appearance in a World Cup knockout round.

The round-of-16 tie against Cameroon at the Stadio San Paolo on 23 June remained goalless through 90 minutes. In extra time, the 38-year-old Roger Milla scored twice in three minutes, the second after intercepting René Higuita far outside his penalty area as the goalkeeper attempted to dribble past him; Redín replied with five minutes remaining, and Cameroon won 2–1 to become the first African side to reach a World Cup quarter-final.

Maturana departed shortly after the tournament and was succeeded by Luis Augusto García. Colombia topped their first-round group at the 1991 Copa América in Chile, beating Brazil 2–0 along the way, but lost all three matches in the four-team final round to finish fourth.

Maturana returned in 1993 to oversee qualification for the 1994 FIFA World Cup. With Valderrama as captain, Colombia reached the semi-finals of the 1993 Copa América, eliminating Uruguay on penalties in the quarter-finals before losing 6–5 on penalties to Argentina after a goalless semi-final in Guayaquil. Adolfo Valencia scored the only goal in a 1–0 win over the hosts Ecuador in the third-place match in Portoviejo.

Colombia went through the 1994 qualifying group unbeaten, winning four and drawing two of six matches and conceding twice. The campaign closed on 5 September 1993 at the Estadio Monumental in Buenos Aires, where a 5–0 victory over Argentina — two goals each for Rincón and Faustino Asprilla, and a fifth from Adolfo Valencia — sealed qualification and consigned the 1990 finalists to a play-off. (Note: Sources differ on the timing of Rincón's second and Asprilla's second goals, given as the 62nd and 64th minutes by FIFA and as the 72nd and 74th by match databases.) The result made Colombia among the most widely tipped sides for the finals; Pelé named them his favourites for the title.

=== The 1994 World Cup and the death of Andrés Escobar ===
Colombia arrived at the 1994 FIFA World Cup without Higuita, who had spent seven months in the Cárcel Modelo in Bogotá during 1993 after accepting payment for acting as an intermediary in a kidnapping — an offence under Colombian law regardless of intent — and was unavailable for selection. Drawn in Group A with Romania, the United States and Switzerland, they lost their opening match 3–1 at the Rose Bowl on 18 June, Florin Răducioiu scoring twice and Gheorghe Hagi lobbing Óscar Córdoba from thirty yards; Valencia headed Colombia's reply.

In the days before the second match the midfielder Gabriel Jaime Gómez received telephoned threats against his family and home, and Maturana withdrew him from the starting eleven, later saying he could not put another person's life at risk. On 22 June, before 93,194 spectators at the Rose Bowl, the defender Andrés Escobar turned a low cross into his own net in the 34th minute; Earnie Stewart added a second after the interval and, though Valencia scored in the 90th, the United States won 2–1 for their first World Cup victory in 44 years, eliminating Colombia. A dead-rubber 2–0 win over Switzerland at Stanford Stadium on 26 June, through Hernán Gaviria and Harold Lozano, spared Colombia a tournament without a victory.

Ten days after the own goal, in the early hours of 2 July 1994, Escobar was shot dead at the age of 27 in a car park outside a bar in the Las Palmas district of Medellín, having been harangued about the goal by a group of men. His funeral in Medellín drew crowds of mourners and prompted national reflection on the violence surrounding the game. Humberto Muñoz Castro, a bodyguard employed by the alleged drug trafficker Santiago Gallón, confessed to the shooting and was sentenced to 43 years' imprisonment, of which he served eleven; investigators discounted early suggestions that gambling syndicates had ordered the killing, though the theory persisted.

=== Gómez, France 1998 and the end of the cycle (1995–1999) ===
Hernán Darío Gómez, known as El Bolillo, replaced Maturana in 1995. Colombia lost 2–0 to the hosts Uruguay in the semi-finals of the 1995 Copa América before beating the United States 4–1 in Maldonado to take third place, Wilmer Cabrera, Valderrama, Asprilla and Rincón all scoring. Two years later they were eliminated 2–1 by the hosts Bolivia in the quarter-finals of the 1997 Copa América.

Colombia reached the 1998 FIFA World Cup by finishing third in the first CONMEBOL qualifying tournament contested as a single home-and-away league, taking 28 points from sixteen matches — two behind Argentina and one behind Paraguay — with Asprilla their leading scorer on seven goals, including a hat-trick in a 4–1 win over Chile in Barranquilla. Drawn in Group G with Tunisia, England and Romania, they lost 1–0 to Romania, beat Tunisia 1–0, and were eliminated on 26 June by England at the Stade Bollaert-Delelis in Lens. Darren Anderton volleyed England ahead in the 20th minute and David Beckham curled in a free kick from some 30 yards nine minutes later for his first international goal, Faryd Mondragón keeping the margin to 2–0 thereafter.

=== Gold Cup runners-up and the 2001 Copa América (2000–2001) ===
Colombia made their first appearance at the CONCACAF Gold Cup as invited guests in 2000, beating Jamaica 1–0 through Gonzalo Martínez and losing 2–0 to Honduras in a three-team group, both matches played at the Miami Orange Bowl. In the quarter-final on 19 February they twice came from behind against the hosts the United States — Faustino Asprilla cancelling out Brian McBride and Gerardo Bedoya equalising in the 81st minute after Chris Armas had scored — to draw 2–2 after extra time, then won the shoot-out 2–1 in a sequence in which six of the nine attempts failed. A 2–1 semi-final win over Peru at Qualcomm Stadium followed, an own goal by Marcial Salazar and a Víctor Bonilla strike putting Colombia through before a crowd of 3,402. In the final at the Los Angeles Memorial Coliseum on 27 February, Canada won 2–0 through a Jason de Vos header in first-half stoppage time and a Carlo Corazzin penalty, before 6,197 spectators.

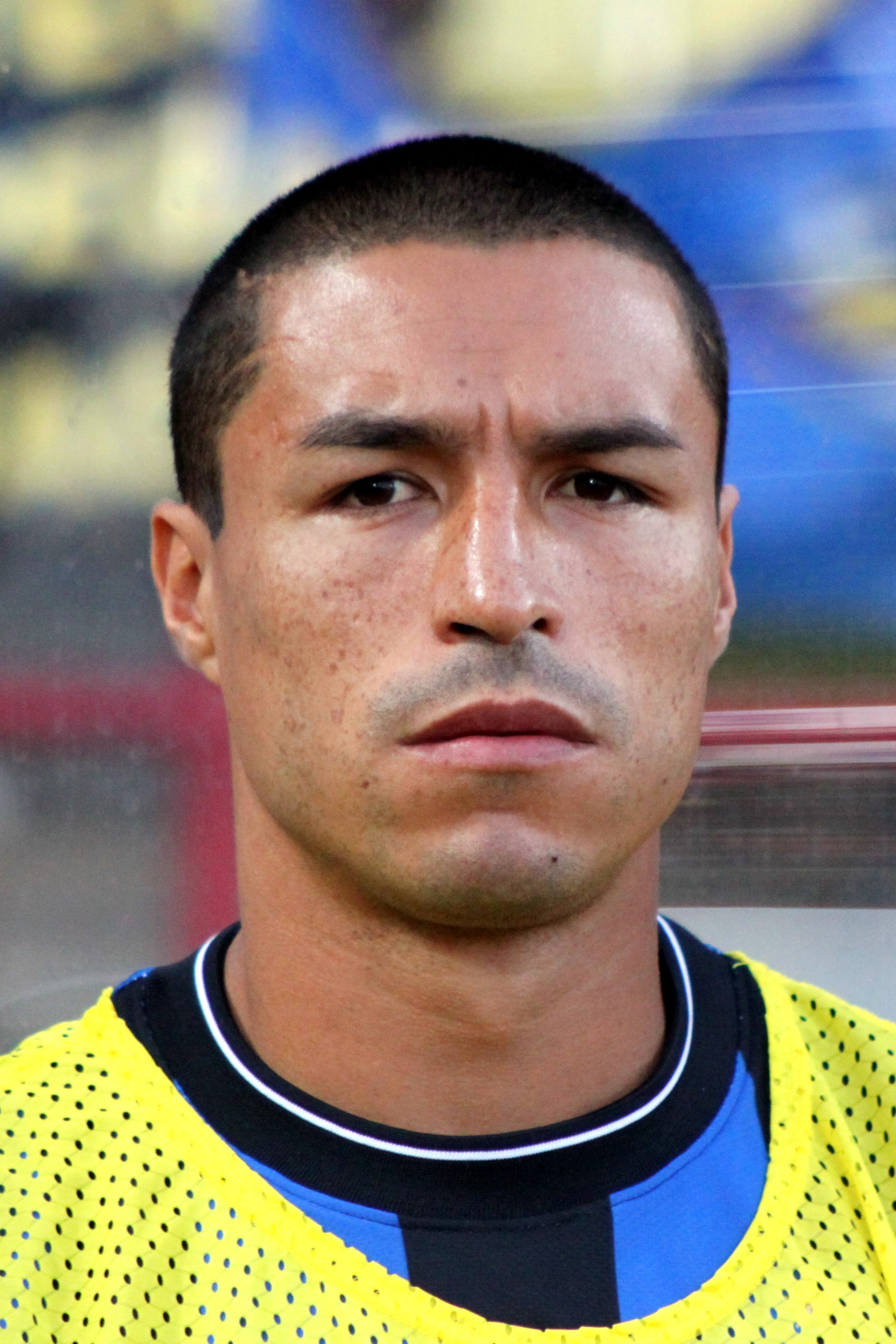
Iván Córdoba scored the only goal of the 2001 Copa América final against Mexico

The 2001 Copa América, hosted by Colombia, was nearly lost to the country's security situation. CONMEBOL held three meetings on the matter: on 28 June 2001 the tournament was moved out of Colombia, on 30 June it was returned but postponed to 2002, and on 5 July the original schedule was confirmed. Canada, one of two invited guests, withdrew on 6 July and Argentina on 10 July, the day before the opening match; Costa Rica and Honduras were invited in their place. Honduras arrived with a hastily assembled squad and went on to reach the semi-finals.

Colombia won Group A with maximum points, all three matches played at the Estadio Metropolitano Roberto Meléndez in Barranquilla: Venezuela were beaten 2–0 through Freddy Grisales and a Víctor Aristizábal penalty, Ecuador 1–0 through Aristizábal, and Chile 2–0 through an Aristizábal penalty and a 90th-minute goal from Iván Arriaga. Peru were beaten 3–0 in the quarter-finals at Armenia, Aristizábal scoring twice, and Honduras — who had eliminated Brazil in the previous round — were beaten 2–0 in the semi-final at the Estadio Palogrande in Manizales, Bedoya scoring inside six minutes and Aristizábal adding the second.

In the final at the Estadio El Campín in Bogotá on 29 July, before 47,000 spectators, Iván Córdoba headed in the only goal in the 65th minute to beat Mexico 1–0 and win Colombia's first major trophy. Colombia won the competition without conceding a goal, keeping six clean sheets in six matches and scoring eleven, the highest total of the tournament. They also took the fair play award, Óscar Córdoba was named best goalkeeper, and Aristizábal finished as top scorer with six goals.

=== Decline and managerial instability (2002–2009) ===
Colombia's 2001 Copa América title was followed by three unsuccessful FIFA World Cup qualifying campaigns. The national team had six managerial spells under four coaches during the period: Francisco Maturana, Reinaldo Rueda, Maturana again, Rueda again, Jorge Luis Pinto and Eduardo Lara.

Maturana oversaw Colombia's failed 2002 World Cup qualifying campaign, in which the team finished sixth with 27 points, level with fifth-placed Uruguay but behind on goal difference. Rueda then coached Colombia for three matches in May 2002, before Maturana returned in November 2002. Under Maturana, Colombia reached the semi-finals of the 2003 FIFA Confederations Cup, losing 1–0 to Cameroon in a match overshadowed by the death of Cameroonian midfielder Marc-Vivien Foé, before losing 2–1 to Turkey in the third-place play-off.

Rueda returned in February 2004 and led Colombia through qualification for the 2006 World Cup. Colombia reached the semi-finals of the 2004 Copa América and the invited 2005 CONCACAF Gold Cup, but again finished sixth in World Cup qualifying, with 24 points—one behind Uruguay in the inter-confederation play-off place.

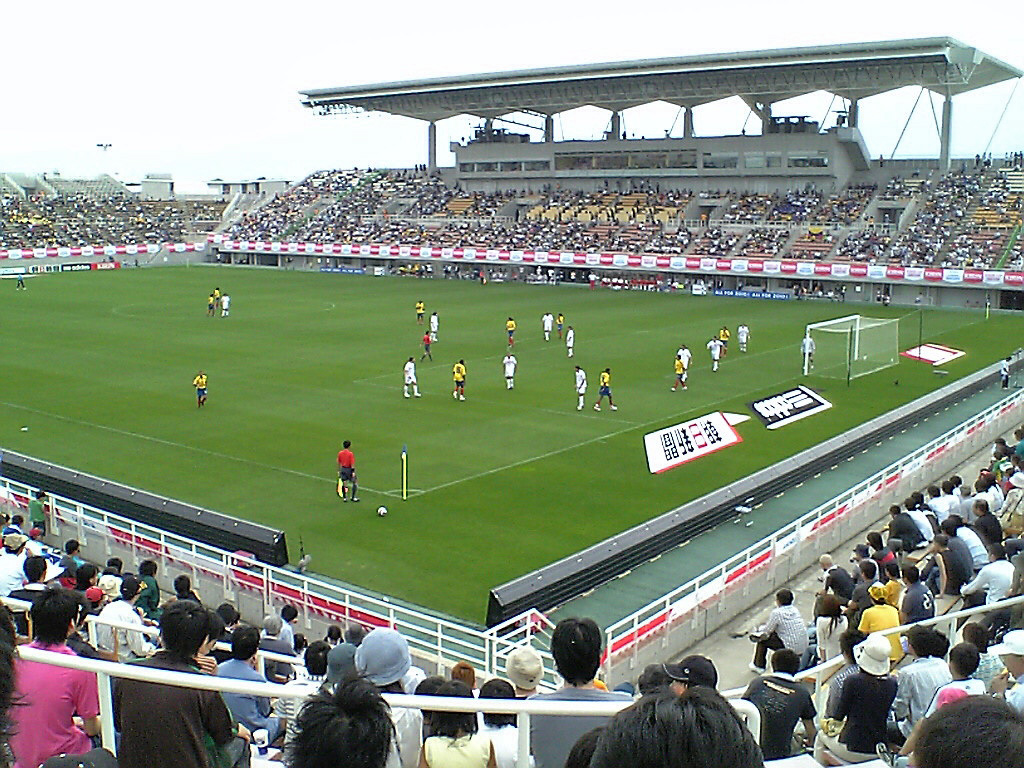
Colombia during the 2007 Kirin Cup

The Colombian Football Federation appointed Pinto as Rueda's successor in December 2006. Colombia were eliminated in the group stage of the 2007 Copa América, before Pinto was dismissed in September 2008 following a 1–0 home defeat by Uruguay and a 4–0 loss to Chile in Santiago. Lara, formerly the federation's youth-team coach, initially replaced him on an interim basis.

Under Lara, Colombia finished seventh of ten teams in the 2010 World Cup qualifiers, with 23 points and 14 goals in 18 matches. They were level on points and goal difference with sixth-placed Ecuador, but ranked below them on goals scored. A 4–2 home defeat to Chile on 10 October 2009 confirmed elimination, and Lara resigned after the campaign.

=== The Pékerman era and the golden generation (2011–2018) ===
At the 2011 Copa América in Argentina, Colombia won Group A ahead of the hosts with seven points and without conceding, beating Costa Rica 1–0 and Bolivia 2–0 either side of a goalless draw with Argentina, but were eliminated 2–0 by Peru in the quarter-finals at Córdoba after extra time.

José Pékerman, the Argentine who had taken his own country to the 2006 World Cup quarter-finals, was appointed head coach in January 2012. Colombia finished second in the CONMEBOL qualifiers with 30 points to reach the 2014 FIFA World Cup, ending a sixteen-year absence, and conceded only 13 goals — the second-best defensive record in the group behind Argentina.

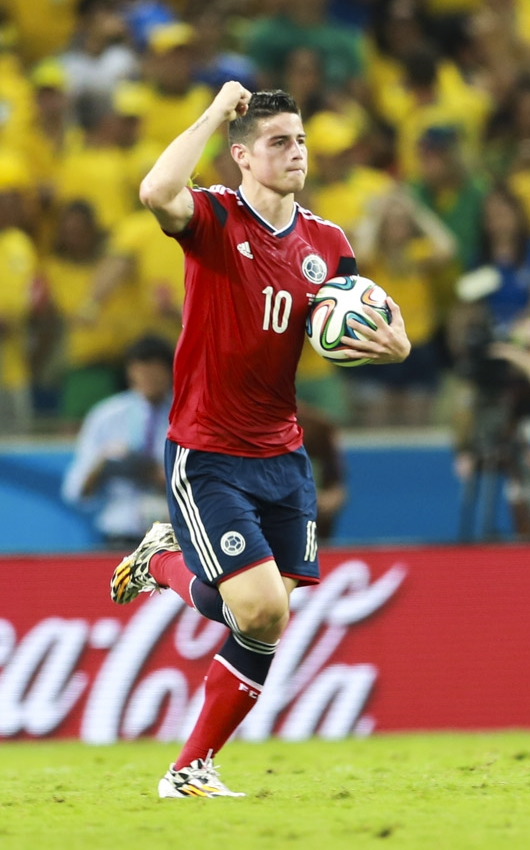
James Rodríguez at the 2014 FIFA World Cup, where he won the Golden Boot with six goals.

Radamel Falcao, who had scored nine goals in qualification, ruptured the anterior cruciate ligament in his left knee playing for Monaco in the Coupe de France in January 2014 and was omitted from the final 23-man squad on 2 June, Pékerman calling it "the saddest day I've had since becoming Colombia coach". Without him Colombia won all three Group C matches, beating Greece 3–0, Ivory Coast 2–1 and Japan 4–1. A 2–0 win over Uruguay at the Maracanã took them to a first World Cup quarter-final, where they lost 2–1 to the hosts Brazil in Fortaleza, James Rodríguez scoring a late penalty in a match that also produced the back injury which ended Neymar's tournament. Rodríguez won the Golden Boot with six goals and the FIFA Puskás Award for his volley against Uruguay.

The following two Copa Américas brought a quarter-final exit and a third-place finish. At the 2015 Copa América in Chile, Colombia lost 1–0 to Venezuela, beat Brazil 1–0 and drew 0–0 with Peru to advance third in Group C on four points with one goal scored; Argentina eliminated them 5–4 on penalties in Viña del Mar after a goalless quarter-final. At the Copa América Centenario in the United States they beat the hosts 2–0 and Paraguay 2–1 before losing 3–2 to Costa Rica to finish second in Group A. Peru were beaten 4–2 on penalties in the quarter-finals at East Rutherford, Chile won the semi-final 2–0 in Chicago, and Colombia took third place by beating the United States 1–0 in Glendale.

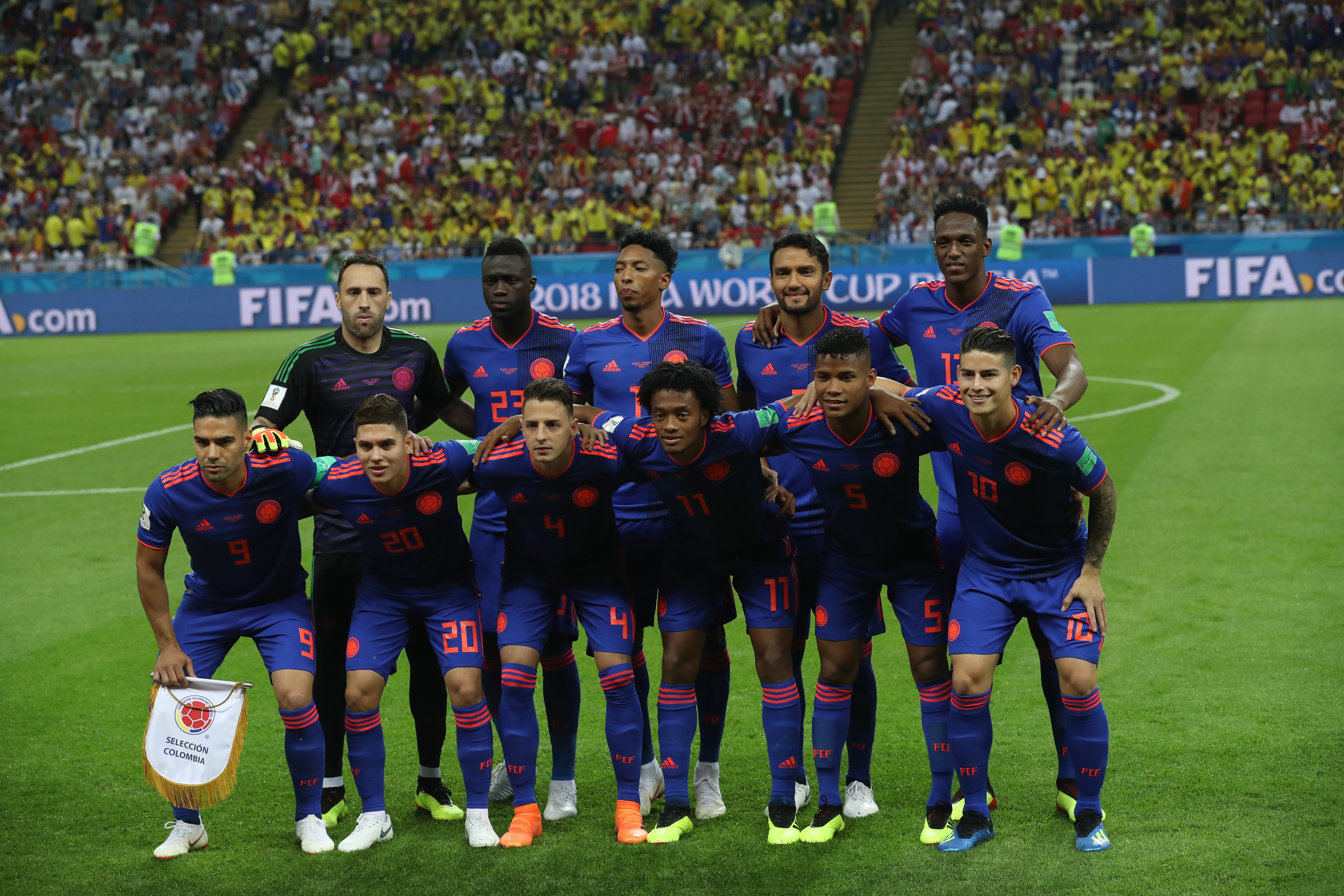
Colombia line up before their group stage match against Poland at the 2018 FIFA World Cup

Colombia finished fourth in CONMEBOL with 27 points to reach the 2018 FIFA World Cup. They lost their opening match 2–1 to Japan in Saransk after Carlos Sánchez was sent off for a deliberate handball two minutes and 56 seconds in — the second-fastest dismissal in World Cup history, behind José Batista's for Uruguay in 1986 — then beat Poland 3–0 and Senegal 1–0 to top Group H. In the round of 16 at the Spartak Stadium in Moscow, Yerry Mina equalised in the third minute of stoppage time to force a 1–1 draw with England; England won the shoot-out 4–3, Mateus Uribe striking the crossbar and Carlos Bacca's attempt being saved.

=== Queiroz, Rueda and a missed World Cup (2019–2022) ===
Pékerman stepped down in September 2018 after more than six years in charge, and the former Manchester United assistant and Iran manager Carlos Queiroz was presented as his successor in Bogotá on 7 February 2019. (Note: Sources differ on the length of Queiroz's contract, variously reported as four and five years.) Colombia opened the 2019 Copa América by beating Argentina 2–0 in Salvador, their first win over La Albiceleste since 2007, then beat Qatar 1–0 and Paraguay 1–0 to take nine points from three matches without conceding. Chile eliminated them 5–4 on penalties in the quarter-finals in São Paulo after a goalless draw.

Colombia began the 2022 qualifiers with a 3–0 win over Venezuela and a 2–2 draw in Santiago, but form collapsed after the campaign's COVID-19 suspension. A 3–0 home defeat by Uruguay in Barranquilla on 13 November 2020 was followed four days later by a 6–1 loss in Quito. Queiroz departed on 1 December 2020, and on 14 January 2021 the federation announced the return of Reinaldo Rueda.

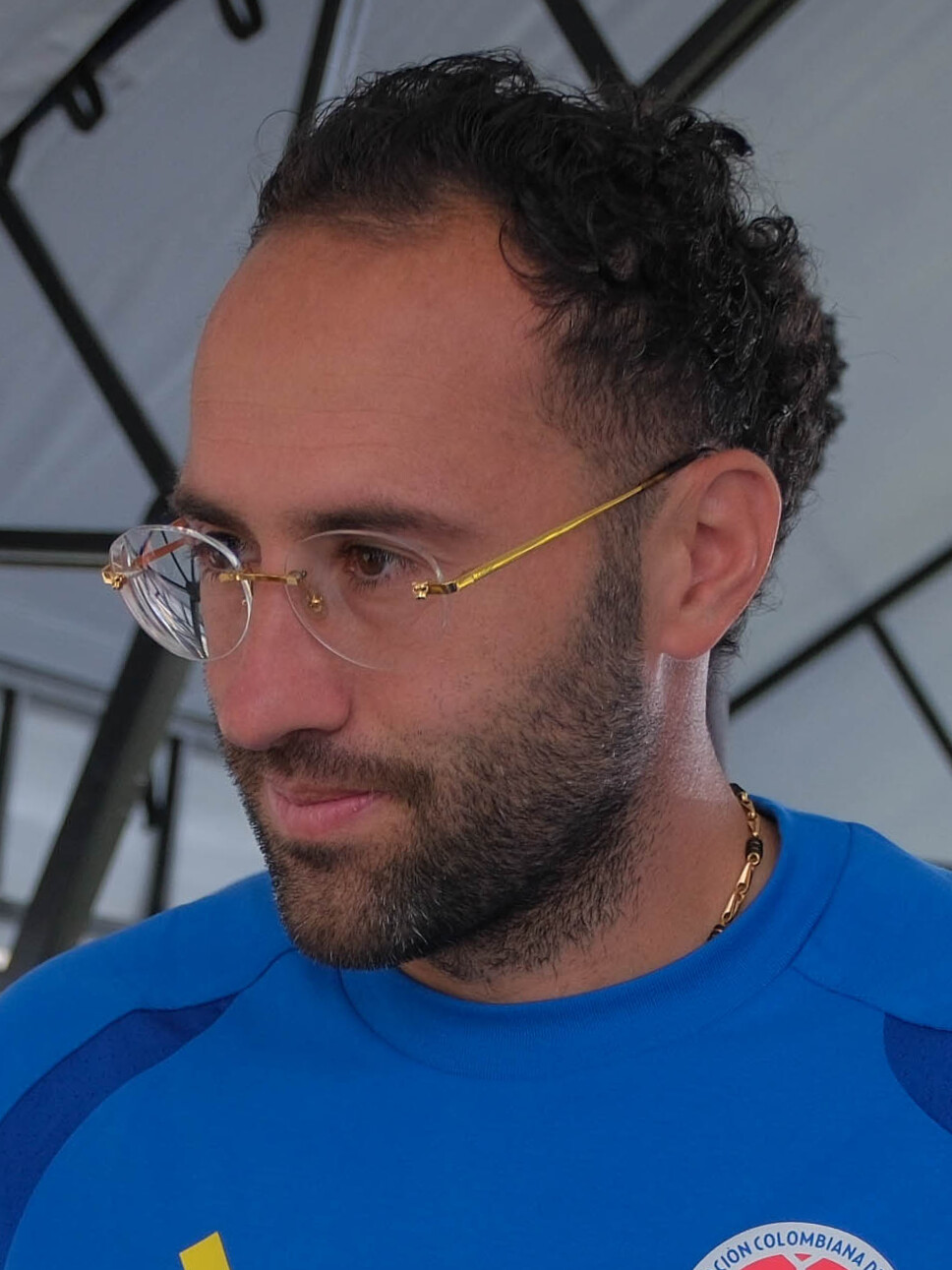
David Ospina formerly became Colombia's most-capped player during the 2021 Copa América.

The 2021 Copa América, relocated to Brazil on short notice, brought a third-place finish for Colombia. They beat Ecuador 1–0, drew 0–0 with Venezuela, then lost 2–1 to both Peru and Brazil to finish third in Group B on four points. They then eliminated Uruguay 4–2 on penalties following a goalless draw in the quarter-finals in Brasília, a match in which goalkeeper David Ospina passed Carlos Valderrama's appearance record to become Colombia's most-capped player. Colombia lost in the semi-finals to Argentina 3–2 on penalties after a 1–1 draw, but went on to beat Peru 3–2 in the third-place match, with Luis Díaz scoring twice to finish as the tournament's joint-leading scorer alongside Lionel Messi with four goals.

Qualification for the World Cup in Qatar was lost after a scoring drought spanning seven consecutive matches. Although Colombia beat Venezuela 1–0 in their final fixture, they finished sixth on 23 points, one behind Peru, who took the play-off place. Rueda departed as manager shortly afterwards.

=== The Lorenzo era (2022–present) ===
On 2 June 2022, the federation appointed Néstor Lorenzo, an Argentine who had served as Pékerman's assistant, on a four-year contract. On 28 February 2023, it launched Fútbol con Futuro, a FIFA-supported development programme running from 2022 to 2025 and intended to strengthen the structures of all national teams.

Under Lorenzo, Colombia assembled a 28-match unbeaten run, notably including wins against Germany away from home in June 2023, and Spain in London in March 2024, their first-ever victories against either nation. They also defeated Brazil in a World Cup qualifier for the first time, winning 2–1 at home thanks to a quick brace from Luis Díaz on 16 November 2023. At the 2024 Copa América in the United States, Colombia topped their group with seven points, beating Paraguay 2–1, Costa Rica 3–0, and drawing 1–1 with Brazil. They then defeated Panama 5–0 in the quarter-finals in Glendale and Uruguay 1–0 in the semi-finals in Charlotte. In the final in Miami Gardens on 14 July, Colombia lost 1–0 to holders Argentina after extra time following a Lautaro Martínez goal in the 112th minute, their first defeat since a loss against the same opponents back in February 2022. Kick-off at the Hard Rock Stadium was delayed by roughly 80 minutes after unticketed supporters breached the perimeter gates; Miami-Dade County officials later attributed the disorder to inadequate intelligence gathering and insufficient security perimeters, and organisers eventually settled a resulting class action for $14 million in November 2025. Despite defeat, Colombia captain Rodríguez was named Player of the Tournament after registering a record-breaking six assists in a single Copa América campaign.

Despite a drop in form following the Copa América loss, Colombia qualified for the 2026 FIFA World Cup on 4 September 2025 with a 3–0 win over Bolivia in Barranquilla, securing a seventh World Cup appearance and ending a six-match run without a victory. They closed the qualifying campaign five days later with a 6–3 win in Maturín, in which Luis Suárez scored four goals for Colombia to eliminate opponents Venezuela from contention, and finished in third place on 28 points, level with Uruguay, Brazil and Paraguay, but ahead on goal difference and goals scored.

At the 2026 World Cup, held across North America, Colombia qualified for the knockout stage after winning 3–1 against Uzbekistan and 1–0 against DR Congo, and secured top spot in Group K following a goalless draw with Portugal on 27 June. They then defeated Ghana 1–0 in the round of 32 in Kansas City, thanks to an early goal by Jhon Arias. Colombia would face Switzerland in the last 16 on 7 July in Vancouver, becoming the only team at the tournament to play in all three host countries. The match finished scoreless following Colombia spurning multiple chances in front of goal. Despite only conceding once across the entire World Cup, Colombia was then eliminated after losing 4–3 on penalties, with Davinson Sánchez's attempt striking the bar and Cucho Hernández seeing his effort saved by Swiss goalkeeper Gregor Kobel. James Rodríguez's appearance in the match was his 131st for Colombia, surpassing Ospina as the nation's most-capped player. However, he subsequently announced his international retirement on 15 September 2026, ending a fifteen-year career.

Following the conclusion of the World Cup, the federation confirmed an extension of Lorenzo's contract on 23 July 2026.

== Rivalries ==
=== Venezuela ===
Colombia and neighbouring Venezuela have met regularly in the South American Championship, the Copa América and World Cup qualification. Colombia has historically held the superior head-to-head record, but the fixture has gained importance as Venezuela's national team became more competitive from the late 1990s.

Venezuela's 1–0 victory in Barranquilla during 2006 World Cup qualification was regarded as a landmark result for the Venezuelan side. In 2026 World Cup qualification, Colombia won 1–0 in Barranquilla in September 2023 and 6–3 in Maturín in September 2025; the latter result eliminated Venezuela from contention for the CONMEBOL inter-confederation play-off place.

=== Argentina ===
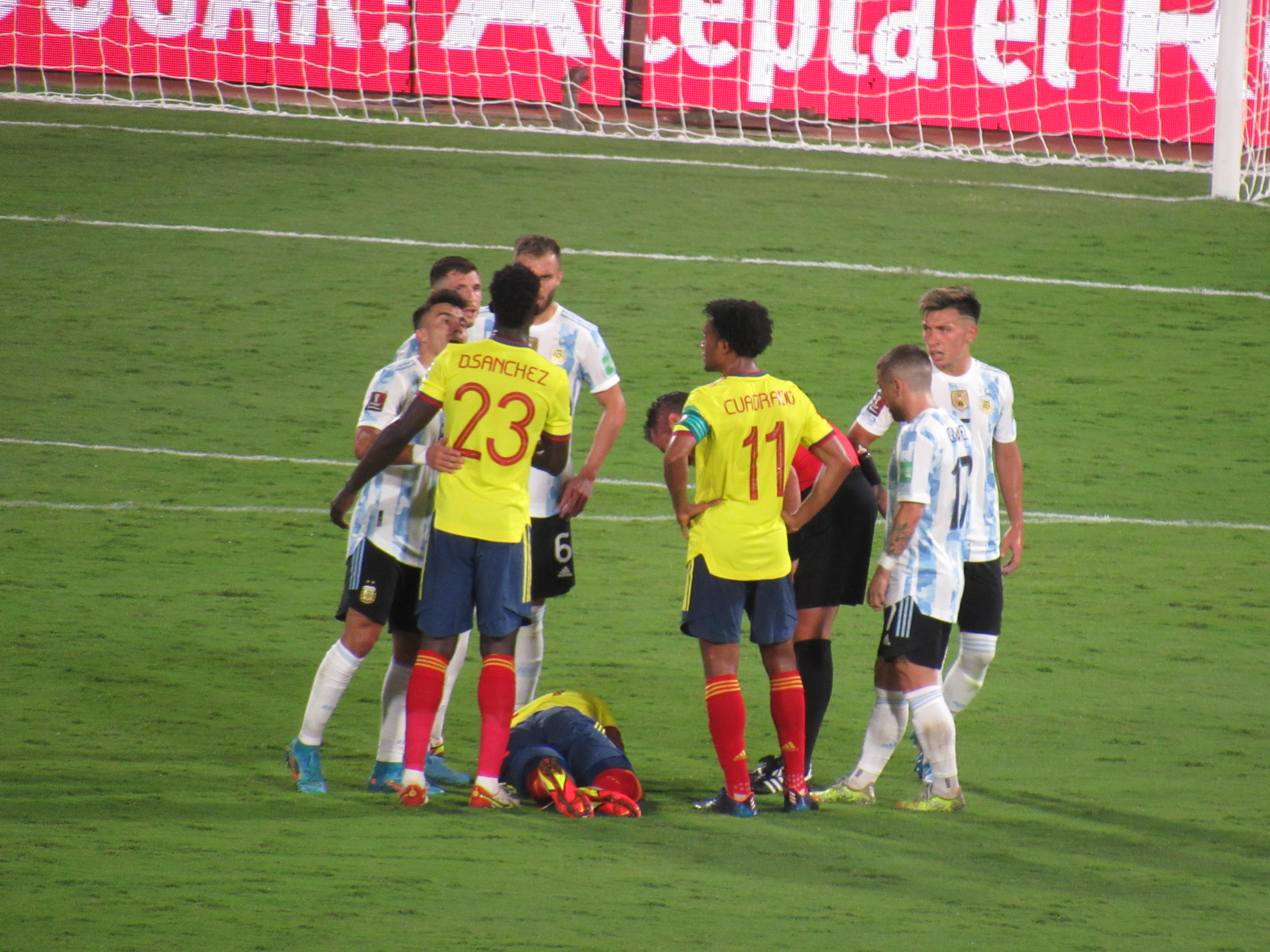
Colombia and Argentina players contest possession during a 2022 World Cup qualifier on 1 February 2022.

Colombia first played Argentina at the 1945 South American Championship in Chile. Argentina holds the superior overall head-to-head record, but the fixture acquired greater prominence during qualification for the 1994 FIFA World Cup. Colombia beat Argentina 2–1 in Barranquilla in August 1993, ending Argentina's 31-match unbeaten run, before winning the return match 5–0 at the Estadio Monumental three weeks later. The result secured Colombia's direct qualification for the 1994 finals, handed Argentina its first home defeat in World Cup qualification, and remains one of the most notable results in Colombian football history.

Colombia also defeated Argentina 3–0 in the group stage of the 1999 Copa América, a match in which Martín Palermo missed three penalties. The fixture developed a more openly confrontational dimension during the 2021 Copa América semi-final. After a 1–1 draw, Argentina won the shootout 3–2; goalkeeper Emiliano Martínez repeatedly addressed Colombian takers during the shootout, while Lionel Messi taunted Yerry Mina after Martínez saved Mina's penalty, referring to the defender's goal celebration.

Argentina defeated Colombia 1–0 after extra time in the 2024 Copa América final. Their next competitive meeting came in 2026 World Cup qualification in September 2024, when Colombia beat the reigning Copa América champions 2–1 in Barranquilla. The return fixture in Buenos Aires in June 2025 ended 1–1 and included several confrontations between the teams, including a verbal exchange between Lionel Messi and James Rodríguez.

== Home stadium ==
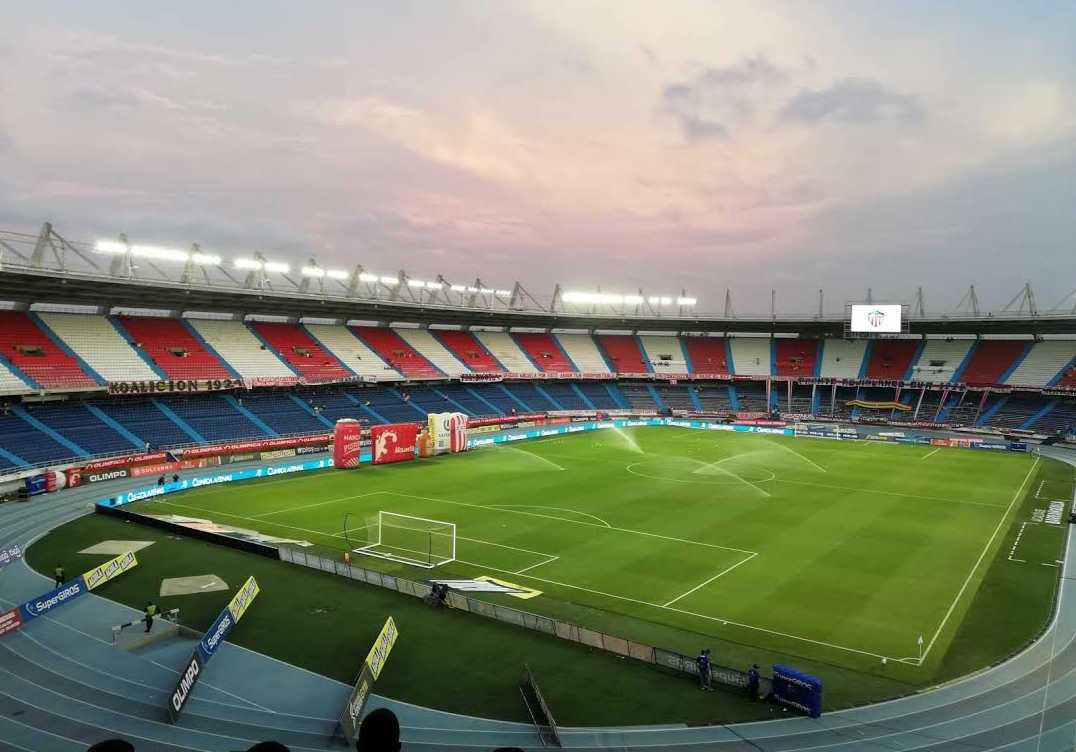
The Estadio Metropolitano Roberto Meléndez in Barranquilla, Colombia's principal venue for World Cup qualifying matches.

Colombia play most home World Cup qualifying matches at the Estadio Metropolitano Roberto Meléndez in Barranquilla. Opened in 1986, the stadium is the home ground of Atlético Junior and was renamed in 1991 in honour of Roberto Meléndez, a Colombian player and manager from Barranquilla. It hosted Colombia's home matches in the successful qualification campaigns for the 1990, 1994 and 1998 FIFA World Cup, and has remained the national team's principal qualifying venue.

The national team also plays home fixtures at other venues. Estadio Nemesio Camacho El Campín in Bogotá is the home ground of Independiente Santa Fe and Millonarios and hosted the 2001 Copa América final, in which Colombia beat Mexico 1–0 to win its first Copa América title.

== Team image ==
The team is commonly known as Los Cafeteros ("The Coffee Growers"), after Colombia's coffee industry, and as La Tricolor, after the yellow, blue and red of the national flag. The Colombian state broadcaster's archive service has described the shirt as having become "a new national symbol", worn across regions and social classes on match days.

Colombia's yellow shirt, blue shorts and red socks are a relatively recent settlement rather than an inherited palette. Early sides alternated white and blue, with white worn at the 1945 South American Championship and dark blue at the 1962 FIFA World Cup. From 1971 the team wore orange, known domestically as zapote. In 1985 the Colombian Football Federation commissioned the designer María Elvira Pardo to base a kit on the national flag; her design made red the first-choice shirt, worn through the 1990 FIFA World Cup, with yellow as the alternative. Yellow was promoted to first choice in the early 1990s. Subsequent departures have been tournament-specific: a red change kit at the 2014 FIFA World Cup referencing the 1990s alternates, and a white first-choice shirt at the Copa América Centenario echoing the 1945 side.

Adidas has supplied the team since January 2011 under an agreement signed in November 2010, subsequently extended to 2030; earlier suppliers included Le Coq Sportif, Adidas, Puma, Kelme, Umbro, Reebok and Lotto.

=== Kit sponsorship ===
Kit supplier	Period
(West Germany) Adidas	1980–1987
(West Germany) Puma	1987
(West Germany) Adidas	1988–1990
(Spain) Kelme	1991
(Colombia) Comba	1992
(United Kingdom) Umbro	1992–1998
(United Kingdom) Reebok	1998–2002
(Italy) Lotto	2002–2010
(Germany) Adidas	2011–present

== Results and fixtures ==
The following is a list of match results in the last 12 months, as well as any future matches that have been scheduled.

Win Draw Loss Fixture

=== 2025 ===
15 November Friendly	Colombia	2–1	New Zealand	Fort Lauderdale, United States
19:00 UTC−5	Puerta 3'; Carbonero 88'	Report	Old 80'	Stadium: Chase Stadium; Attendance: 20,000; Referee: Cristian Condori (Bolivia)

18 November Friendly	Colombia	3–0	Australia	New York City, United States
20:30 UTC−4	Rodríguez 76' (pen.); Díaz 89'; Lerma 90+3'	Report		Stadium: Citi Field; Attendance: 42,000; Referee: Tori Penso (United States)

=== 2026 ===
26 March Friendly	Colombia	1–2	Croatia	Orlando, United States
19:30 UTC−4	J. Arias 2'	Report	Vušković 6'; Matanović 42'	Stadium: Camping World Stadium; Attendance: 50,000; Referee: Rubiel Vazquez (United States)

29 March Friendly	Colombia	1–3	France	Landover, United States
15:00 UTC−4	Campaz 77'	Report	Doué 29', 56'; Thuram 41'	Stadium: Northwest Stadium; Attendance: 60,734; Referee: Victor Rivas (United States)

1 June Friendly	Colombia	3–1	Costa Rica	Bogotá, Colombia
18:00 UTC−5	Sánchez 17'; Díaz 23'; Suárez 81'	Report	Soto 33'	Stadium: Estadio El Campín; Attendance: 11,806; Referee: Guillermo Guerrero (Ecuador)

7 June Friendly	Colombia	2–0	Jordan	San Diego, United States
16:00 UTC−7	J. Arias 41', 55'	Report		Stadium: Snapdragon Stadium; Attendance: 28,831; Referee: Jesús López Valle (Mexico)

17 June 2026 FIFA World Cup GS	Uzbekistan	1–3	Colombia	Mexico City, Mexico
20:00 UTC−6	Fayzullaev 60'	Report	Muñoz 40'; Díaz 65'; Campaz 90+9'	Stadium: Estadio Azteca; Attendance: 80,824; Referee: Anthony Taylor (England)

23 June 2026 FIFA World Cup GS	Colombia	1–0	DR Congo	Zapopan, Mexico
20:00 UTC−6	Muñoz 76'	Report		Stadium: Estadio Akron; Attendance: 45,358; Referee: Maurizio Mariani (Italy)

27 June 2026 FIFA World Cup GS	Colombia	0–0	Portugal	Miami Gardens, United States
19:30 UTC−4		Report		Stadium: Hard Rock Stadium; Attendance: 64,478; Referee: Alireza Faghani (Australia)

3 July 2026 FIFA World Cup R32	Colombia	1–0	Ghana	Kansas City, United States
20:30 UTC−5	J. Arias 14'	Report		Stadium: Arrowhead Stadium; Attendance: 69,045; Referee: Clément Turpin (France)

7 July 2026 FIFA World Cup R16	Switzerland	0–0 (a.e.t.) (4–3 p)	Colombia	Vancouver, Canada
13:00 UTC−7		Report		Stadium: BC Place; Attendance: 52,497; Referee: Iván Barton (El Salvador)
	Penalties
	Xhaka (penalty scored); Amdouni (penalty scored); Akanji (penalty missed); Itten (penalty scored); Vargas (penalty scored)		(penalty scored) Quintero; (penalty missed) Sánchez; (penalty scored) Campaz; (penalty missed) Hernández; (penalty scored) Díaz

26 September Friendly	Mexico	1–1	Colombia	Baltimore, United States
21:00 UTC−4	Mora 62'	Report	Suárez 9'	Stadium: M&T Bank Stadium; Attendance: 67,117; Referee: Guido Gonzales Jr. (United States)

2 October Friendly	Colombia	0–1	Paraguay	Harrison, United States
20:00 UTC−4		Report	H. Benítez 56'	Stadium: Sports Illustrated Stadium; Referee: Pierre-Luc Lauzière (Canada)

6 October Friendly	Colombia	2–0	Peru	Miami, United States
19:45 UTC−4	Velásquez 57'; Arcila 90+2'	Report		Stadium: Nu Stadium; Attendance: 15,000; Referee: Rubiel Vázquez (United States)

13 November Friendly	Colombia	1–0	Chile	Cali, Colombia
19:00 UTC−5	Maripán 35' (o.g.)	Report		Stadium: Estadio Olímpico Pascual Guerrero; Referee: Augusto Aragón (Ecuador)

17 November Friendly	Chile	0–0	Colombia	Santiago, Chile
20:00 UTC−3		Report		Stadium: Estadio Nacional Julio Martínez Prádanos; Referee: Augusto Aragón (Ecuador)

== Coaching staff ==
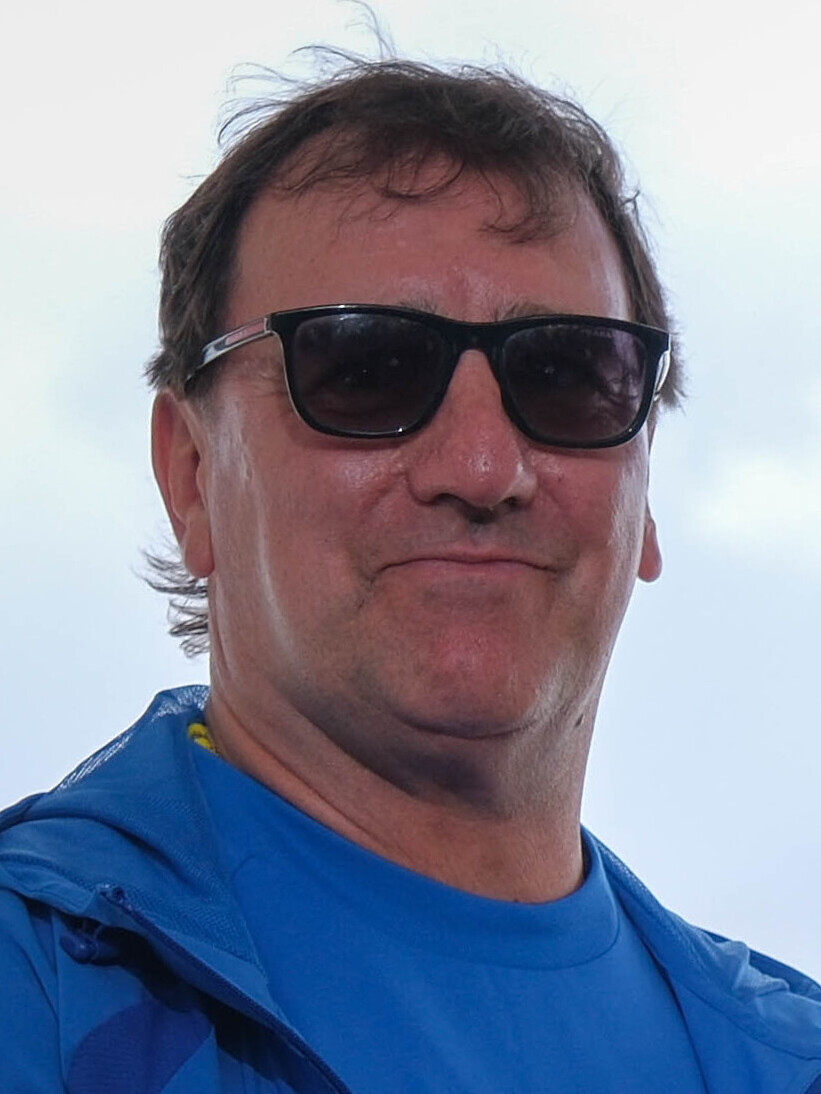
Néstor Lorenzo

Position	Name
Head coach	(Argentina) Néstor Lorenzo
Assistant coaches	(Argentina) Fernando Alloco (Colombia) Luis Amaranto Perea
Goalkeeping coach	(Argentina) Alejandro Otamendi
Fitness coaches	(Argentina) Leandro Jorge (Argentina) Leandro Clocchiatti
Physicians	(Colombia) Gustavo Pineda (Colombia) Mauricio Serrato
Physiotherapist	(Colombia) Salomón Vizcarra
Match analyst	(Colombia) Francis García Talavera
Media consultant	(Colombia) Pablo Vásquez Peñaranda

== Players ==
=== Current squad ===
The following players were called up for the friendly matches against Chile on 13 and 17 November 2026, respectively.
Caps and goals updated as of 17 November 2026, after the match against Chile.

No.	Pos.	Player	Date of birth (age)	Caps	Goals	Club
1	GK	Aldair Quintana	11 July 1994 (age 32)	2	0	(Ecuadorian Football Federation) Independiente del Valle
12	GK	Camilo Vargas	9 March 1989 (age 37)	48	0	(Mexican Football Federation) Atlas F.C.
24	GK	Devis Vasquez	12 May 1998 (age 28)	1	0	(Italian Football Federation) AS Roma
2	DF	Daniel Muñoz	26 May 1996 (age 30)	56	5	(The Football Association) Nottingham Forest
3	DF	Jhon Lucumí	26 June 1998 (age 28)	46	1	(Italian Football Federation) Juventus
4	DF	Juan Cabal	8 January 2001 (age 25)	4	0	(Italian Football Federation) Juventus
5	DF	Juan David Arizala	10 October 2005 (age 21)	1	0	(Italian Football Federation) Udinese
17	DF	Samuel Velásquez	29 May 2003 (age 23)	7	1	(Colombian Football Federation) Atlético Nacional
18	DF	Édier Ocampo	10 March 2003 (age 23)	1	0	(Canadian Soccer Association) Vancouver Whitecaps
23	DF	Davinson Sánchez	12 June 1996 (age 30)	89	4	(Turkish Football Federation) Galatasaray
25	DF	Kevin Andrade	16 June 1999 (age 27)	3	0	(Russian Football Union) Zenit Saint Petersburg
6	MF	Matías Orozco	1 December 2007 (age 18)	4	0	(Royal Spanish Football Federation) Castellón
8	MF	Gustavo Puerta	26 July 2003 (age 23)	16	1	(Hellenic Football Federation) Olympiacos
10	MF	Jhon Arias	21 September 1997 (age 29)	47	7	(Brazilian Football Confederation) Palmeiras
13	MF	Daniel Arcila	16 May 2002 (age 24)	2	1	(Mexican Football Federation) León
14	MF	Jhon Solís	3 October 2004 (age 22)	3	0	(The Football Association) Birmingham City
15	MF	Nelson Deossa	6 February 2003 (age 23)	1	0	(Royal Spanish Football Federation) Real Betis
16	MF	Jefferson Lerma	25 October 1994 (age 32)	72	5	(The Football Association) Crystal Palace
19	MF	Juan Manuel Rengifo	2 April 2005 (age 21)	3	0	(Colombian Football Federation) Atlético Nacional
22	MF	Yáser Asprilla	19 November 2003 (age 23)	15	2	(Royal Spanish Football Federation) Girona
7	FW	Óscar Perea	27 September 2005 (age 21)	1	0	(Mexican Football Federation) América
9	FW	Luis Suárez	2 December 1997 (age 28)	22	6	(Portuguese Football Federation) Sporting CP
11	FW	Camilo Durán	10 February 2002 (age 24)	4	0	(Scottish Football Association) Celtic
20	FW	Daniel Mosquera	20 October 1999 (age 27)	2	0	(Italian Football Federation) Hellas Verona
21	FW	Óscar Cortés	3 December 2003 (age 22)	1	0	(Argentine Football Association) Huracán
26	FW	Camilo Mena	1 October 2002 (age 24)	1	0	(Polish Football Association) Korona Kielce

=== Recent call-ups ===
The following players have also been called up in the last twelve months.

Pos.	Player	Date of birth (age)	Caps	Goals	Club	Latest call-up
GK	Álvaro Montero	29 March 1995 (age 31)	12	0	(Argentina) Boca Juniors	v. Peru, 6 October 2026
GK	Kevin Mier	9 March 2000 (age 26)	4	0	(Mexico) Cruz Azul	v. Peru, 6 October 2026
GK	David Ospina ^{RET}	31 August 1988 (age 38)	130	0	Retired	2026 FIFA World Cup
GK	Andrés Mosquera	10 September 1991 (age 35)	1	0	(Colombia) Independiente Santa Fe	2026 FIFA World Cup ^{PRE}
DF	Alvaro Angulo	6 March 1998 (age 28)	7	0	(Mexico) Pumas UNAM	v. Peru, 6 October 2026
DF	Royer Caicedo	5 May 2006 (age 20)	0	0	(Belgium) Cercle Brugge	v. Peru, 6 October 2026
DF	Santiago Arias	13 January 1992 (age 34)	69	0	(Argentina) Independiente	2026 FIFA World Cup
DF	Yerry Mina	23 September 1994 (age 32)	55	8	(Italy) Cagliari	2026 FIFA World Cup
DF	Johan Mojica	21 August 1992 (age 34)	49	1	(Spain) Getafe	2026 FIFA World Cup
DF	Deiver Machado	2 September 1993 (age 33)	16	0	(Russia) Rodina Moscow	2026 FIFA World Cup
DF	Willer Ditta	23 January 1997 (age 29)	5	0	(Mexico) Cruz Azul	2026 FIFA World Cup
DF	Carlos Cuesta	9 March 1999 (age 27)	24	0	(Brazil) Vasco da Gama	2026 FIFA World Cup ^{PRE}
DF	Cristian Borja	18 February 1993 (age 33)	8	0	(Mexico) América	2026 FIFA World Cup ^{PRE}
DF	Yerson Mosquera	2 May 2001 (age 25)	4	1	(England) Wolverhampton Wanderers	2026 FIFA World Cup ^{PRE}
DF	Andrés Román	5 October 1995 (age 31)	3	0	(Colombia) Atlético Nacional	2026 FIFA World Cup ^{PRE}
DF	Junior Hernández	5 April 1999 (age 27)	0	0	(Colombia) Deportes Tolima	2026 FIFA World Cup ^{PRE}
DF	Jhohan Romaña	13 September 1998 (age 28)	0	0	(Mexico) León	2026 FIFA World Cup ^{PRE}
MF	Kevin Castaño	29 September 2000 (age 26)	30	0	(Brazil) Atlético Minero	v. Peru, 6 October 2026
MF	Richard Ríos	2 June 2000 (age 26)	40	2	(Saudi Arabia) Al-Ittihad Club (Jeddah)	v. Peru, 6 October 2026
MF	James Rodríguez ^{RET}	12 July 1991 (age 35)	131	31	(Colombia) Atlético Nacional	2026 FIFA World Cup
MF	Juan Fernando Quintero ^{RET}	18 January 1993 (age 33)	53	6	(Colombia) Independiente Medellín	2026 FIFA World Cup
MF	Jorge Carrascal	25 May 1998 (age 28)	24	2	(Brazil) Flamengo	2026 FIFA World Cup
MF	Juan Portilla	12 September 1998 (age 28)	10	0	(Brazil) Athletico Paranaense	2026 FIFA World Cup
MF	Juan Cuadrado	26 May 1988 (age 38)	116	11	(Colombia) Millonarios	2026 FIFA World Cup ^{PRE}
MF	Wilmar Barrios	16 October 1993 (age 33)	55	1	(Russia) Zenit Saint Petersburg	2026 FIFA World Cup ^{PRE}
MF	Sebastián Gómez	3 June 1996 (age 30)	2	0	(Brazil) Coritiba	2026 FIFA World Cup ^{PRE}
MF	Jordan Barrera	11 April 2006 (age 20)	0	0	(Brazil) Botafogo	2026 FIFA World Cup ^{PRE}
MF	Johan Rojas	20 September 2002 (age 24)	0	0	(Brazil) Vasco da Gama	2026 FIFA World Cup ^{PRE}
MF	Jaminton Campaz	24 May 2000 (age 26)	15	2	(Argentina) Rosario Central	v. Chile, 13 November 2026 ^{INJ}
FW	Kevin Viveros	26 April 2000 (age 26)	3	0	(Brazil) Club Athletico Paranaense	v. Peru, 6 October 2026
FW	Andres Gomez	12 September 2002 (age 24)	11	2	(Brazil) Vasco Da Gama	v. Peru, 6 October 2026
FW	Luis Díaz	13 January 1997 (age 29)	79	23	(Germany) Bayern Munich	2026 FIFA World Cup
FW	Jhon Córdoba	11 May 1993 (age 33)	24	6	(Russia) Krasnodar	2026 FIFA World Cup
FW	Cucho Hernández	20 April 1999 (age 27)	11	2	(Spain) Betis	2026 FIFA World Cup
FW	Rafael Santos Borré	15 September 1995 (age 31)	44	6	(Argentina) River Plate	2026 FIFA World Cup ^{PRE}
FW	Jhon Durán	13 December 2003 (age 22)	17	3	(Portugal) Benfica	2026 FIFA World Cup ^{PRE}
FW	Sebastián Villa	19 May 1996 (age 30)	4	0	(Argentina) Boca Juniors	2026 FIFA World Cup ^{PRE}
FW	Johan Carbonero	20 July 1999 (age 27)	2	2	(Brazil) Internacional	2026 FIFA World Cup ^{PRE}
FW	Stiven Mendoza	27 June 1992 (age 34)	2	0	(Brazil) Athletico Paranaense	2026 FIFA World Cup ^{PRE}
FW	Edwuin Cetré	1 January 1998 (age 28)	0	0	(Argentina) Estudiantes	2026 FIFA World Cup ^{PRE}
FW	Néiser Villarreal	24 April 2005 (age 21)	0	0	(Brazil) Cruzeiro	2026 FIFA World Cup ^{PRE}
^{INJ} Withdrew due to injury^{PRE} Preliminary squad^{RET} Retired from the national team^{SUS} Suspended

== Individual records ==
As of 2 October 2026.
Players in bold are still active with Colombia.

=== Most capped players ===
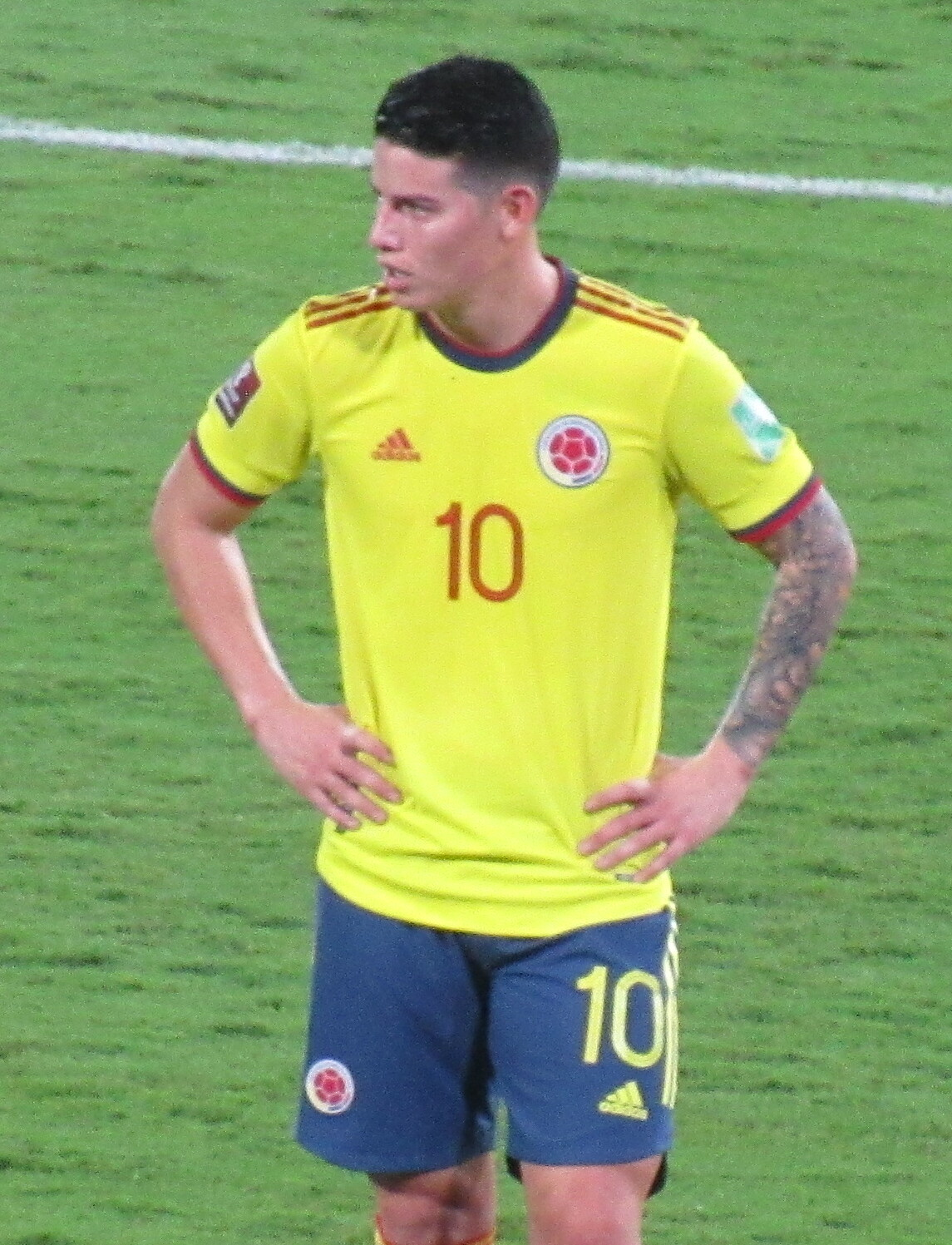
James Rodríguez is Colombia's most capped player with 131 international appearances.

Rank	Player	Caps	Goals	Career
1	James Rodríguez	131	31	2011–2026
2	David Ospina	130	0	2007–2026
3	Juan Cuadrado	116	11	2010–2023
4	Carlos Valderrama	111	11	1985–1998
5	Radamel Falcao	104	36	2007–2023
6	Mario Yepes	102	6	1999–2014
7	Leonel Álvarez	101	1	1985–1997
8	Carlos Sánchez	88	0	2007–2018
9	**Davinson Sánchez**	86	4	2016–present
10	Freddy Rincón	84	17	1990–2001

=== Top goalscorers ===
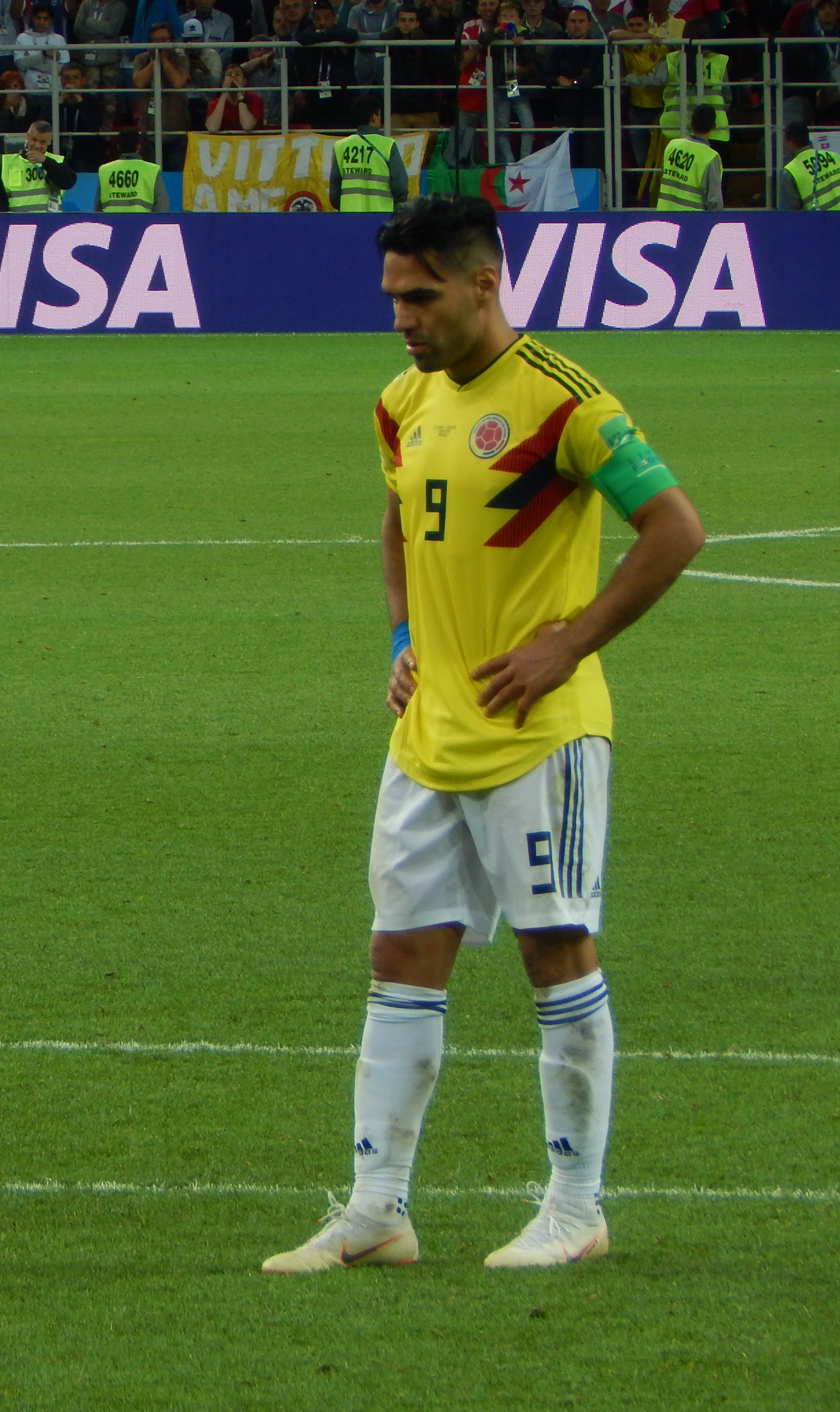
Radamel Falcao is Colombia's all-time top scorer with 36 goals.

Rank	Player	Goals	Caps	Average	Career
1	Radamel Falcao (list)	36	104	0.35	2007–2023
2	James Rodríguez	31	131	0.24	2011–2026
3	Arnoldo Iguarán	25	68	0.37	1979–1993
4	**Luis Díaz**	23	79	0.29	2018–present
5	Faustino Asprilla	20	57	0.35	1993–2001
6	Freddy Rincón	17	84	0.2	1990–2001
7	Carlos Bacca	16	52	0.31	2010–2018
8	Teófilo Gutiérrez	15	51	0.29	2009–2017
8	Víctor Aristizábal	15	66	0.23	1993–2003
10	Adolfo Valencia	14	37	0.38	1992–1998

== Competitive record ==
=== FIFA World Cup ===
FIFA World Cup record										Qualification record						
Year	Round	Position	Pld	W	D	L	GF	GA	Squad	Pos	Pld	W	D	L	GF	GA
(Uruguay) 1930	Not a FIFA member									Not a FIFA member						
(Italy) 1934	Not a FIFA member									Not a FIFA member						
(France) 1938	Withdrew									Withdrew						
(Brazil) 1950	Banned									Banned						
(Switzerland) 1954	Banned									Banned						
(Sweden) 1958	Did not qualify									3rd	4	0	1	3	3	8
(Chile) 1962	Group stage	14th	3	0	1	2	5	11	Squad	1st	2	1	1	0	2	1
(England) 1966	Did not qualify									3rd	4	1	0	3	4	10
(Mexico) 1970	Did not qualify									3rd	6	1	1	4	7	12
(West Germany) 1974	Did not qualify									2nd	4	1	3	0	3	2
(Argentina) 1978	Did not qualify									3rd	4	0	2	2	1	8
(Spain) 1982	Did not qualify									3rd	4	0	2	2	4	7
(Mexico) 1986	Did not qualify									3rd	8	3	2	3	8	10
(Italy) 1990	Round of 16	14th	4	1	1	2	4	4	Squad	1st^{1}	6	3	2	1	6	3
(United States) 1994	Group stage	19th	3	1	0	2	4	5	Squad	1st	6	4	2	0	13	2
(France) 1998	Group stage	21st	3	1	0	2	1	3	Squad	3rd	16	8	4	4	23	15
(South Korea) (Japan) 2002	Did not qualify									6th	18	7	6	5	20	15
(Germany) 2006	Did not qualify									6th	18	6	6	6	24	16
(South Africa) 2010	Did not qualify									7th	18	6	5	7	14	18
(Brazil) 2014	Quarter-finals	5th	5	4	0	1	12	4	Squad	2nd	16	9	3	4	27	13
(Russia) 2018	Round of 16	9th	4	2	1	1	6	3	Squad	4th	18	7	6	5	21	19
(Qatar) 2022	Did not qualify									6th	18	5	8	5	20	19
(Canada) (Mexico) (United States) 2026	Round of 16	10th	5	3	2	0	5	1	Squad	3rd	18	7	7	4	28	18
(Morocco) (Portugal) (Spain) 2030	To be determined									To be determined						
(Saudi Arabia) 2034	To be determined									To be determined						
Total	Quarter-finals	7/23	27	12	5	10	37	31	—	5th	188	69	61	58	228	196

1.Played Intercontinental playoffs.

=== Copa América ===
Champions Runners-up Third place Fourth place

South American Championship / Copa América record
Year	Round	Position	Pld	W	D	L	GF	GA	Squad
(Argentina) 1916	No national representative								
(Uruguay) 1917	No national representative								
(Brazil) 1919	No national representative								
(Chile) 1920	No national representative								
(Argentina) 1921	No national representative								
(Brazil) 1922	No national representative								
(Uruguay) 1923	No national representative								
(Uruguay) 1924	No national representative								
(Argentina) 1925	Not a CONMEBOL member								
(Chile) 1926	Not a CONMEBOL member								
(Peru) 1927	Not a CONMEBOL member								
(Argentina) 1929	Not a CONMEBOL member								
(Peru) 1935	Not a CONMEBOL member								
(Argentina) 1937	Withdrew								
(Peru) 1939	Withdrew								
(Chile) 1941	Withdrew								
(Uruguay) 1942	Withdrew								
(Chile) 1945	Fifth place	5th	6	1	1	4	7	25	Squad
(Argentina) 1946	Withdrew								
(Ecuador) 1947	Eighth place	8th	7	0	2	5	2	19	Squad
(Brazil) 1949	Eighth place	8th	7	0	2	5	4	23	Squad
(Peru) 1953	Withdrew								
(Chile) 1955	Withdrew								
(Uruguay) 1956	Withdrew								
(Peru) 1957	Fifth place	5th	6	2	0	4	10	25	Squad
(Argentina) 1959	Withdrew								
(Ecuador) 1959	Withdrew								
(Bolivia) 1963	Seventh place	7th	6	0	1	5	10	19	Squad
(Uruguay) 1967	Did not qualify								
1975	Runners-up	2nd	9	6	0	3	11	5	Squad
1979	Group stage	5th	4	2	1	1	5	2	Squad
1983	Group stage	7th	4	1	2	1	5	5	Squad
(Argentina) 1987	Third place	3rd	4	3	0	1	8	3	Squad
(Brazil) 1989	Group stage	6th	4	1	2	1	5	4	Squad
(Chile) 1991	Fourth place	4th	7	2	2	3	5	6	Squad
(Ecuador) 1993	Third place	3rd	6	3	2	1	6	4	Squad
(Uruguay) 1995	Third place	3rd	6	3	1	2	7	8	Squad
(Bolivia) 1997	Quarter-finals	8th	4	1	0	3	6	7	Squad
(Paraguay) 1999	Quarter-finals	5th	4	3	0	1	8	4	Squad
(Colombia) 2001	Champions	1st	6	6	0	0	11	0	Squad
(Peru) 2004	Fourth place	4th	6	3	1	2	7	7	Squad
(Venezuela) 2007	Group stage	9th	3	1	0	2	3	9	Squad
(Argentina) 2011	Quarter-finals	6th	4	2	1	1	3	2	Squad
(Chile) 2015	Quarter-finals	6th	4	1	2	1	1	1	Squad
(United States) 2016	Third place	3rd	6	3	1	2	7	6	Squad
(Brazil) 2019	Quarter-finals	5th	4	3	1	0	4	0	Squad
(Brazil) 2021	Third place	3rd	7	2	3	2	7	7	Squad
(United States) 2024	Runners-up	2nd	6	4	1	1	12	3	Squad
Total	1 Title	24/35	130	53	26	51	154	194	—

=== CONCACAF Gold Cup ===
CONCACAF Gold Cup record
Year	Round	Position	Pld	W	D	L	GF	GA	Squad
(United States) 2000	Runners-up	2nd	5	2	1	2	5	7	Squad
(Mexico) (United States) 2003	Quarter-finals	5th	3	1	1	1	2	3	Squad
(United States) 2005	Semi-finals	4th	5	2	0	3	7	7	Squad
Total	Runners-up	3/3	13	5	2	6	14	17	—

=== FIFA Confederations Cup ===
FIFA Confederations Cup record
Year	Round	Position	Pld	W	D	L	GF	GA	Squad
(Saudi Arabia) 1992	Did not qualify								
(Saudi Arabia) 1995	Did not qualify								
(Saudi Arabia) 1997	Did not qualify								
(Mexico) 1999	Did not qualify								
(South Korea) (Japan) 2001	Did not qualify								
(France) 2003	Fourth place	4th	5	2	0	3	5	5	Squad
(Germany) 2005	Did not qualify								
(South Africa) 2009	Did not qualify								
(Brazil) 2013	Did not qualify								
(Russia) 2017	Did not qualify								
Total	Fourth place	1/10	5	2	0	3	5	5	—

== Head-to-head record ==
Below is a result summary of all matches Colombia have played against FIFA recognized teams.

As of 17 November 2026

Positive Record Neutral Record Negative Record

Opponents	Pld	W	D	L	GF	GA	GD	Win %
Algeria	1	0	0	1	0	3	−3	0%
Argentina	43	10	12	21	42	74	−32	23.26%
Australia	5	3	2	0	7	2	+5	60%
Bahrain	1	1	0	0	6	0	+6	100%
Belgium	2	1	0	1	2	2	0	50%
Bolivia	34	17	10	7	54	31	+23	50%
Brazil	38	4	12	22	22	71	−49	10.53%
Cameroon	4	2	0	2	8	3	+5	50%
Canada	4	2	1	1	4	2	+2	50%
Chile	46	13	18	15	60	70	−10	28.26%
China	2	1	0	1	5	2	+3	50%
Costa Rica	16	13	0	3	40	17	+23	80%
Croatia	1	0	0	1	1	2	−1	0%
Curaçao (Note: Includes matches against Territory of Curaçao.)	1	1	0	0	4	2	+2	100%
DR Congo	1	1	0	0	1	0	+1	100%
East Germany	1	0	0	1	0	2	−2	0%
Ecuador	50	23	13	14	54	45	+9	46%
Egypt	2	0	2	0	1	1	0	0%
El Salvador	7	5	1	1	16	7	+9	71.43%
England	6	0	3	3	4	11	−7	0%
Finland	1	1	0	0	3	1	+2	100%
France	5	1	0	4	6	10	−4	20%
Germany (Note: Includes matches against West Germany.)	5	1	2	2	7	10	−3	20%
Ghana	1	1	0	0	1	0	+1	100%
Greece	2	2	0	0	5	0	+5	100%
Guatemala	5	3	2	0	14	6	+8	60%
Haiti	5	4	0	1	12	4	+8	80%
Honduras	12	5	2	5	13	12	+1	41.67%
Hungary	1	0	0	1	1	3	−2	0%
Iraq	1	1	0	0	1	0	+1	100%
Israel	2	1	1	0	1	0	+1	50%
Ivory Coast	1	1	0	0	2	1	+1	100%
Jamaica	5	4	0	1	7	1	+6	80%
Japan	6	4	1	1	9	4	+5	66.67%
Jordan	2	2	0	0	5	0	+5	100%
Kuwait	1	1	0	0	3	1	+2	100%
Liberia	1	1	0	0	2	1	+1	100%
Mexico	30	10	10	10	32	30	+2	33.33%
Montenegro	1	1	0	0	1	0	+1	100%
Morocco	1	1	0	0	2	0	+2	100%
Netherlands	1	0	1	0	0	0	0	0%
New Zealand	2	2	0	0	5	2	+3	100%
Nigeria	4	3	1	0	4	1	+3	75%
Northern Ireland	1	1	0	0	2	0	+2	100%
Norway	1	0	1	0	0	0	0	0%
Panama	7	5	0	2	20	7	+13	71.43%
Paraguay	52	23	10	19	61	56	+5	44.23%
Peru	63	22	24	17	74	66	+8	34.92%
Poland	8	5	1	2	12	9	+3	62.5%
Portugal	1	0	1	0	0	0	0	0%
Puerto Rico	1	1	0	0	4	1	+3	100%
Qatar	1	1	0	0	1	0	+1	100%
Republic of Ireland	1	0	0	1	0	1	−1	0%
Romania	4	1	1	2	4	6	−2	25%
Russia (Note: Includes matches against the Soviet Union.)	3	0	2	1	5	7	−2	0%
Saudi Arabia	3	2	1	0	3	1	+2	66.67%
Scotland	3	1	2	0	3	2	+1	33.33%
Senegal	2	1	1	0	3	2	+1	50%
Serbia (Note: Includes matches against Yugoslavia.)	5	1	1	3	1	7	−6	20%
Slovakia	3	2	1	0	2	0	+2	66.67%
Slovenia	1	1	0	0	1	0	+1	100%
South Africa	1	0	0	1	1	2	−1	0%
South Korea	8	1	3	4	9	14	−5	12.50%
Spain	4	1	2	1	4	4	0	25%
Sweden	2	0	2	0	2	2	0	0%
Switzerland	5	2	2	1	9	6	+3	40%
Trinidad and Tobago	3	2	0	1	8	4	+4	66.67%
Tunisia	2	1	1	0	2	1	+1	50%
Turkey	1	0	0	1	1	2	−1	0%
United Arab Emirates	1	1	0	0	2	0	+2	100%
United States	22	14	5	3	33	15	+18	63.64%
Uruguay	47	13	13	21	52	67	−14	27.66%
Uzbekistan	1	1	0	0	3	1	2	100%
Venezuela	44	22	15	7	64	29	+35	50%
Total (72)	661	272	183	206	853	746	+107	41%

== Honours ==
=== Continental ===
- Copa América
  - (gold) Champions (1): 2001
  - (silver) Runners-up (2): 1975, 2024
  - (bronze) Third place (5): 1987, 1993, 1995, 2016, 2021
- CONCACAF Gold Cup
  - (silver) Runners-up (1): 2000

=== Regional ===
- Central American and Caribbean Games
  - (gold) Gold medal (1): 1946
  - (bronze) Bronze medal (1): 1938

=== Friendly ===
- Copa Centenario de Armenia (1): 1989
- Marlboro Cup (1): 1990

=== Awards ===
- FIFA Best Mover of the Year (1): 1993
- FIFA World Cup Fair Play Trophy (1): 2014
- Copa America Fair Play Award (1): 2024

=== Summary ===
Competition	1st place, gold medalist(s)	2nd place, silver medalist(s)	3rd place, bronze medalist(s)	Total
CONMEBOL Copa América	1	2	5	8
CONCACAF Gold Cup	0	1	0	1
Central American and Caribbean Games	1	0	1	2
Total	2	3	6	11

== See also ==
- Colombia Olympic football team
- Colombia national under-20 football team
- Colombia national under-17 football team
- Colombia national under-15 football team
- Colombia national futsal team
