= Iván Valenciano =

Colombian footballer (born 1972)

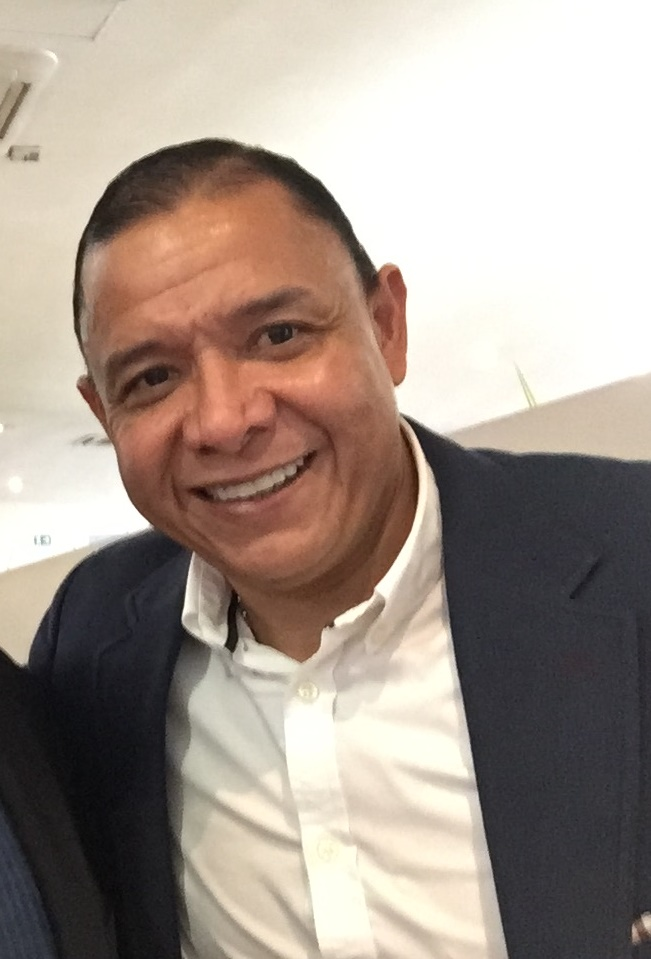

Personal information
- Full name: Iván René Valenciano Pérez
- Date of birth: 18 March 1972 (age 54)
- Place of birth: Barranquilla, Colombia
- Height: 1.76 m (5 ft 9 in)
- Position: Forward

Senior career*
Years	Team	Apps	(Gls)
1988–1992	Atlético Junior	96	(47)
1992–1993	Atalanta	5	(0)
1993–1996	Atlético Junior	64	(93)
1997	Veracruz	10	(6)
1998–2001	Morelia	30	(9)
1998	→ Unicosta (loan)	6	(3)
1999	→ Atlético Junior (loan)	10	(6)
1999	→ Independiente Medellín (loan)	50	(35)
2000	→ Bucaramanga (loan)	19	(9)
2001	→ Gama (loan)	4	(0)
2001	→ Deportivo Cali (loan)	13	(5)
2002	Millonarios	5	(0)
2002	Real Cartagena	1	(2)
2003	Unión Magdalena	17	(6)
2003	Deportes Quindío	14	(4)
2004	Olmedo	17	(3)
2005	Deportes Quindío	15	(0)
2005	Millonarios	8	(1)
2006	Atlético Junior	6	(1)
2006	Olmedo	11	(1)
2007	Independiente Medellín	0	(0)
2007	→ Centauros (loan)	13	(5)
2007	Valledupar	0	(0)
2008	Alianza Petrolera	8	(2)
Total		422	(238)

International career
1989–1991	Colombia U20	6	(2)
1991–2000	Colombia	29	(13)
- * Club domestic league appearances and goals

Iván René Valenciano Pérez (born 18 March 1972) is a Colombian former professional footballer who played as forward. He is the second top goalscorer of all-time in the Colombian Primera A with 217 goals, behind Argentine Sergio Galván Rey, who surpasses him with 224 goals.

During his first spell at Atlético Junior, he scored many goals and was visibly overweight. Due to this, he earned the nickname "El Gordito de Oro" (The Golden Fat Man).

== Club career ==
=== Junior ===
Valenciano was born in Barranquilla. He debuted as a professional player in the Junior from Barranquilla, on 23 October 1988 in a match against Independiente Santa Fe played in Bogotá, in which he scored a goal. Since then, there would be the beginning of a long history of goals that covered two decades – he was the top goal scorer for Junior six times. In 1991, only being 19 years old, he scored 30 goals, winning his first Golden Boot award.

=== Atalanta (Italy) ===
He participated in the Italian Serie A in 1992, playing for Atalanta, where he was unable to score a goal, though he was assigned a goal erroneously. Due to his underperformance, he returned to Barranquilla in the middle of the following year.

=== Junior ===
In 1993, playing for Junior, he won his first title and was the team's top scorer with 18 goals. He then won his second Golden Boot award in 94–95 season, in which Junior won its fourth domestic title, scoring 24 goals in 30 matches. In the season 95–96, he scored 36 goals, breaking his own record and winning another Golden Boot award, the last of the three he won during his football career in Colombia.

=== Veracruz ===
Valenciano was signed for Mexican club Tiburones Rojos de Veracruz. In the 1996–97 season, he made his debut in a match against Potros de Hierro from Atlante, to which he scored a goal on his debut. He then had an injury to his knee during a match against Panzas Verdes from León, leaving him out of the field for about 2 or 3 months. Given the relegation of his team, he was signed by Monarcas Morelia for which he played from 1997 to 1999. He then returned to Colombia.

=== Return to Colombia ===
In Colombia, besides Junior, he played for Deportivo Unicosta, Independiente Medellín, Atlético Bucaramanga, Deportivo Cali, Millonarios, Unión Magdalena, Deportes Quindío and Alianza Petrolera.

=== Farewell Match ===
On 11 July 2009, a testimonial match was carried out for Iván René Valenciano in the Roberto Meléndez Stadium. For the friendly match, many recognised football players were invited such as the Dutch player Edgar Davids, the Chilean Iván Zamorano, the Uruguayan Paolo Montero, the Argentinian Sergio Goycochea, and the Colombians Carlos Valderrama, Faustino Asprilla, Arnoldo Iguarán, Mauricio Serna, Víctor Hugo Aristizábal, among others. The match ended up with an 8–7 win for the foreign team and Valenciano scoring two goals.

== International career ==
He played for the Colombia national football team and was a participant at the 1992 Summer Olympics and at the 1994 FIFA World Cup. For the national team he scored 13 goals in 29 games between 1991 and 2000. He made his debut for the national side on 15 July 1991 at the 1991 Copa América, when he replaced Arnoldo Iguarán in the 78th minute.

== Career statistics ==
=== Club ===
Appearances and goals by club, season and competition
Club	Season	League			Cup		Continental		Total	
Club	Season	Division	Apps	Goals	Apps	Goals	Apps	Goals	Apps	Goals
Atlético Junior	1988	Campeonato Profesional		1	0	0	0	0		1
Atlético Junior	1989	Campeonato Profesional		2	0	0	0	0		2
Atlético Junior	1990	Categoría Primera A	39	8	0	0	0	0	39	8
Atlético Junior	1991	Categoría Primera A	47	30	0	0	0	0	47	30
Atlético Junior	1992	Categoría Primera A	10	6	0	0	0	0	10	6
Atlético Junior	Total									
Atalanta	1992–93	Serie A	5	0	2	0	0	0	7	0
Atlético Junior	1993	Categoría Primera A	17	18	0	0	0	0	17	18
Atlético Junior	1994	Categoría Primera A	21	15	0	0	12	5	33	20
Atlético Junior	1995	Categoría Primera A	26	24	0	0	0	0	26	24
Atlético Junior	1995–96	Categoría Primera A		36	0	0	7	5	7	41
Atlético Junior	Total			93	0	0	19	10		103
Veracruz	1996–97	Liga MX	10	6		6	0	0	10	12
Morelia	1997–98	Liga MX	15	5	0	0	0	0	15	5
Morelia	1998–99	Liga MX	15	4	0	0	0	0	15	4
Morelia	Total		340	9	0	0	0	0	30	9
Unicosta (loan)	1998	Categoría Primera A	6	3	0	0	0	0	6	3
Atlético Junior (loan)	1999	Categoría Primera A	10	6	0	0	0	0	10	6
Independiente Medellín (loan)	1999	Categoría Primera A	38	24	0	0	0	0	38	24
Independiente Medellín (loan)	2000	Categoría Primera A	12	11	0	0	0	0	12	11
Independiente Medellín (loan)	Total		50	35	0	0	0	0	50	35
Atlético Bucaramanga (loan)	2000	Categoría Primera A	19	9	0	0	0	0	19	9
Gama (loan)	2001	Série A	4	0	0	0	0	0	4	0
Deportivo Cali (loan)	2001	Categoría Primera A	13	5	0	0	5	3	18	8
Millonarios	2002	Categoría Primera A	5	0	0	0	0	0	0	0
Real Cartagena	2002	Categoría Primera A	1	2	0	0	0	0	0	0
Unión Magdalena	2003	Categoría Primera A	17	6	0	0	0	0	0	0
Deportes Quindío	2003	Categoría Primera A	14	4	0	0	0	0	0	0
Olmedo	2004	Ecuadorian Serie A	17	3	0	0	0	0	0	0
Deportes Quindío	2005	Categoría Primera A	15	0	0	0	0	0	0	0
Millonarios	2005	Categoría Primera A	8	1	0	0	0	0	0	0
Atlético Junior	2006	Categoría Primera A	6	1	0	0	0	0	0	0
Olmedo	2006	Ecuadorian Serie A	11	1	0	0	0	0	0	0
Centauros (loan)	2007	Categoría Primera B	13	5	0	0	0	0	0	0
Valledupar	2007	Categoría Primera B	0	0	0	0	0	0	0	0
Alianza Petrolera	2008	Categoría Primera B	8	2		1	0	0	8	3
Career total			422	238	2	7	24	13	448	258

=== International ===
Scores and results list Colombia's goal tally first, score column indicates score after each Valenciano goal.

List of international goals scored by Iván Valenciano
No.	Date	Venue	Opponent	Score	Result	Competition
1	15 Aug 1993	Estadio Metropolitano Roberto Meléndez, Barranquilla, Colombia	Argentina	1–0	2–1	1994 FIFA World Cup qualification
2	29 Aug 1993	Estadio Metropolitano Roberto Meléndez, Barranquilla, Colombia	Peru	1–0	4–0	1994 FIFA World Cup qualification
3	28 Jan 1994	Estadio Agustín Tovar, Barinas, Venezuela	Venezuela	2–1	2–1	Friendly
4	6 Feb 1994	Prince Abdullah Al Faisal Stadium, Jeddah, Saudi Arabia	Saudi Arabia	1–0	1–1	Friendly
5	5 May 1994	Miami Orange Bowl, Miami, United States	El Salvador	3–0	3–0	1994 Miami Cup
6	30 Nov 1995	Los Angeles Memorial Coliseum, Los Angeles, United States	Mexico	1–1	2–2	Friendly
7	6 Mar 1996	Miami Orange Bowl, Miami, United States	Honduras	1–1	2–1	Friendly
8	6 Mar 1996	Miami Orange Bowl, Miami, United States	Honduras	2–1	2–1	Friendly
9	15 Dec 1996	Estadio Polideportivo de Pueblo Nuevo, San Cristóbal, Venezuela	Venezuela	2–0	2–0	1998 FIFA World Cup qualification
10	8 Sep 1999	Miami Orange Bowl, Miami, United States	Trinidad and Tobago	1–0	3–4	Friendly
11	8 Sep 1999	Miami Orange Bowl, Miami, United States	Trinidad and Tobago	2–3	3–4	Friendly
12	8 Sep 1999	Miami Orange Bowl, Miami, United States	Trinidad and Tobago	3–3	3–4	Friendly
13	4 Jun 2000	Estadio Nemesio Camacho, Bogotá, Colombia	Venezuela	3–0	3–0	2002 FIFA World Cup qualification

== Personal life ==
Valenciano who is currently a resident of Weston, Florida was arrested on 30 of October 2023 for driving while intoxicated. He was detained but no bail was set for his release. The state of Florida however has suspended his driving license for the offense.

== Honors ==
Junior

- Colombian Championship: 1993,1995

Individual

- All-time top scorer in Junior de Barranquilla (157 goals)
- Second all-time top scorer Categoría Primera A (2009–present)
