= 2000 Categoría Primera A season =

Football competition

Copa Mustang
- Season: 2000
- Dates: 12 February – 17 December 2000
- Champions: América de Cali (10th title)
- Relegated: Deportes Quindío
- Copa Libertadores: América de Cali; Junior; Deportivo Cali
- Matches: 364
- Goals: 972 (2.67 per match)
- Top goalscorer: Carlos Castro (24 goals)

The 2000 Categoría Primera A season, known as Copa Mustang 2000 for sponsoring purposes, was the 53rd season of the Categoría Primera A, Colombia's top-flight football league. The season started on 12 February and ended on 17 December 2000. América de Cali were the champions, clinching their tenth domestic league title with a 2–0 victory over Deportes Tolima on the final day of the season.

Atlético Nacional were the defending champions, but placed seventh in the aggregate table and thus failed to qualify for the final stage of the competition.

== Format ==
The season was split into three stages: the first two stages were the Apertura and Finalización tournaments, in which the 16 teams were first divided into two groups of eight teams, playing seven games, and then all teams in the league played each other once for a total of 22 matches. The winners of each tournament earned a berth into the 2001 Copa Libertadores. The third and final stage was played by the top four teams of the aggregate table of both tournaments, who played each other twice to decide the champions of the season, who also qualified for the Copa Libertadores. In case the eventual champion had already won the Apertura or Finalización tournaments, the runners-up of the final stage would take the third Copa Libertadores berth as the season's runners-up.

== Teams ==
16 teams competed in the season, the top 15 teams of the relegation table of the 1999 season and Real Cartagena, who were promoted as champions of the 1999 Categoría Primera B tournament, replacing Unión Magdalena who were relegated at the end of the previous season.

Locations of the 2000 Categoría Primera A teams

Team	Home city	Stadium	Capacity
América de Cali	Cali	Pascual Guerrero	45,625
Atlético Bucaramanga	Bucaramanga	Alfonso López	28,000
Atlético Huila	Neiva	Guillermo Plazas Alcid	22,000
Atlético Nacional	Medellín	Atanasio Girardot	52,000
Cortuluá	Tuluá	Doce de Octubre	16,000
Deportes Quindío	Armenia	Centenario	29,000
Deportes Tolima	Ibagué	Manuel Murillo Toro	28,100
Deportivo Cali	Cali	Pascual Guerrero	45,625
Deportivo Pasto	Pasto	Departamental Libertad	12,000
Envigado	Envigado	Polideportivo Sur	11,000
Independiente Medellín	Medellín	Atanasio Girardot	52,000
Junior	Barranquilla	Metropolitano Roberto Meléndez	60,000
Millonarios	Bogotá	Nemesio Camacho El Campín	48,300
Once Caldas	Manizales	Palogrande	36,553
Real Cartagena	Cartagena	Pedro de Heredia	16,000
Santa Fe	Bogotá	Nemesio Camacho El Campín	48,300

== Torneo Apertura ==
The Torneo Apertura (also known as Copa Mustang I) began on 12 February and ended on 2 July.

=== Standings ===
Pos	Team	Pld	W	D	L	GF	GA	GD	Pts	Qualification
1	Deportivo Cali	22	11	7	4	36	22	+14	40	Qualification for the Copa Libertadores
2	América de Cali	22	11	5	6	42	22	+20	38	
3	Deportes Tolima	22	11	3	8	36	29	+7	36	
4	Millonarios	22	8	9	5	32	27	+5	33	
5	Atlético Nacional	22	9	5	8	35	29	+6	32	
6	Junior	22	9	5	8	33	27	+6	32	
7	Cortuluá	22	9	5	8	30	31	−1	32	
8	Envigado	22	8	8	6	30	25	+5	32	
9	Santa Fe	22	8	7	7	32	30	+2	31	
10	Real Cartagena	22	7	6	9	21	23	−2	27	
11	Atlético Huila	22	6	9	7	21	27	−6	27	
12	Once Caldas	22	6	9	7	24	31	−7	27	
13	Independiente Medellín	22	6	8	8	28	34	−6	26	
14	Deportivo Pasto	22	6	4	12	27	44	−17	22	
15	Atlético Bucaramanga	22	5	6	11	16	28	−12	21	
16	Deportes Quindío	22	5	6	11	24	38	−14	21	

Source: RSSSF
Rules for classification: 1) Points, 2) Wins, 3) Goal difference, 4) Goals for, 5) Away goals for, 6) Goals against, 7) Away goals against, 8) Drawing of lots.

== Torneo Finalización ==
The Torneo Finalización (also known as Copa Mustang II) began on 9 July and ended on 26 November. On 17 September 2000, during the 12th round match between Santa Fe and Deportes Tolima, referee Óscar Ruiz disallowed a goal for Santa Fe scored by Jeffrey Díaz after checking the existence of a handball with the help of a replay of the television broadcast of the match.

=== Standings ===
Pos	Team	Pld	W	D	L	GF	GA	GD	Pts	Qualification
1	América de Cali	22	14	6	2	40	20	+20	48	Qualification for the Copa Libertadores
2	Santa Fe	22	13	4	5	33	22	+11	43	
3	Junior	22	10	8	4	37	23	+14	38	
4	Millonarios	22	9	9	4	32	23	+9	36	
5	Deportes Tolima	22	10	3	9	31	25	+6	33	
6	Once Caldas	22	9	6	7	29	19	+10	33	
7	Atlético Nacional	22	8	4	10	31	34	−3	28	
8	Deportivo Pasto	22	7	7	8	29	28	+1	28	
9	Independiente Medellín	22	7	6	9	28	30	−2	27	
10	Atlético Bucaramanga	22	7	6	9	23	30	−7	27	
11	Atlético Huila	22	8	2	12	29	39	−10	26	
12	Envigado	22	7	5	10	31	38	−7	26	
13	Real Cartagena	22	6	6	10	23	28	−5	24	
14	Deportes Quindío	22	6	6	10	26	38	−12	24	
15	Deportivo Cali	22	5	6	11	31	42	−11	21	
16	Cortuluá	22	3	10	9	25	39	−14	19	

Source: RSSSF
Rules for classification: 1) Points, 2) Wins, 3) Goal difference, 4) Goals for, 5) Away goals for, 6) Goals against, 7) Away goals against, 8) Drawing of lots.

== Aggregate table ==
An aggregate table known as Reclasificación including the games of both tournaments (Apertura and Finalización) was used to determine the four teams that would advance to the final stage of the tournament, as well as the team to be relegated at the end of the season. The top four teams in this table at the end of the Torneo Finalización advanced to the final stage, while the team placed last was relegated to Categoría Primera B for the following season.

Pos	Team	Pld	W	D	L	GF	GA	GD	Pts	Qualification or relegation
1	América de Cali	44	25	11	8	82	42	+40	86	Advance to the final stage
2	Santa Fe	44	21	11	12	65	52	+13	74	Advance to the final stage
3	Junior	44	19	13	12	70	50	+20	70	Advance to the final stage
4	Deportes Tolima	44	21	6	17	67	54	+13	69	Advance to the final stage
5	Millonarios	44	17	18	9	64	50	+14	69	
6	Deportivo Cali	44	16	13	15	67	64	+3	61	
7	Atlético Nacional	44	17	9	18	66	63	+3	60	
8	Once Caldas	44	15	15	14	53	50	+3	60	
9	Envigado	44	15	13	16	61	63	−2	58	
10	Atlético Huila	44	14	11	19	50	66	−16	53	
11	Independiente Medellín	44	13	14	17	56	64	−8	53	
12	Real Cartagena	44	13	12	19	44	51	−7	51	
13	Cortuluá	44	12	15	17	55	70	−15	51	
14	Deportivo Pasto	44	13	11	20	56	72	−16	50	
15	Atlético Bucaramanga	44	12	12	20	39	58	−19	48	
16	Deportes Quindío (R)	44	11	12	21	50	76	−26	45	Relegation to Categoría Primera B

Source: RSSSF
Rules for classification: 1) Points, 2) Wins, 3) Goal difference, 4) Goals for, 5) Away goals for, 6) Goals against, 7) Away goals against, 8) Drawing of lots.
(R) Relegated

=== Results ===
Home \ Away	AME	BUC	CAL	COR	ENV	HUI	JUN	DIM	MIL	NAC	ONC	PAS	QUI	RCA	SFE	TOL
América		0–1		3–1		2–0	2–0		2–1	1–0	6–1					
América		1–0	1–1	4–0	3–2	6–0	1–1	3–1	1–1	0–1	0–0	1–1	3–1	2–1	4–1	3–2
Bucaramanga	2–0			1–1		0–0	2–3		1–1	1–0	0–0					
Bucaramanga	0–2		1–2	2–1	3–1	3–2	1–0	2–2	1–1	2–1	1–1	0–1	1–1	1–2	0–1	1–0
Deportivo Cali					1–1			3–1				4–0	0–0	1–1	1–0	0–4
Deportivo Cali	0–1	3–1		2–2	2–3	0–0	2–2	1–2	1–0	4–2	1–4	3–2	4–1	2–1	3–4	5–2
Cortuluá	1–0	1–1				3–2	1–1		1–0	3–2	3–0					
Cortuluá	1–1	0–1	2–2		1–1	0–0	1–2	2–2	0–0	3–0	1–3	1–4	1–0	2–0	2–0	1–0
Envigado F.C			0–0					1–3				1–0	1–1	2–0	0–1	2–0
Envigado F.C	1–3	3–0	0–0	1–1		2–0	2–1	2–1	0–2	0–2	0–0	3–1	4–1	1–0	0–2	1–0
Atl. Huila	1–1	3–1		2–1			3–2		0–0	0–0	0–2					
Atl. Huila	2–3	1–0	2–0	0–1	3–1		2–1	1–1	2–1	2–2	2–0	3–1	1–0	2–1	3–1	0–2
Junior	1–3	3–0		5–1		2–0			5–0	0–0	2–0					
Junior	0–0	1–0	1–3	2–2	2–0	2–0		1–0	1–1	1–0	3–1	3–1	2–1	1–1	2–2	3–1
Ind. Medellín			1–0		2–2							2–1	1–0	1–0	0–1	2–1
Ind. Medellín	1–1	1–2	3–2	0–1	1–1	1–2	1–2		1–1	3–4	1–1	1–1	0–2	2–2	1–3	3–1
Millonarios	1–1	1–1		2–0		3–1	3–2			0–1	2–1					
Millonarios	3–2	2–0	2–0	3–1	2–2	4–0	2–0	0–0		4–3	1–1	2–1	2–1	0–0	1–1	3–0
Atl. Nacional	3–1	0–1		2–1		4–1	0–0		3–0		1–1					
Atl. Nacional	0–2	3–0	2–2	3–1	1–3	3–2	2–1	1–2	3–2		0–3	1–2	3–0	2–0	2–2	1–0
Once Caldas	0–1	3–2		4–0		2–1	2–2		2–3	2–1						
Once Caldas	0–1	0–0	0–0	2–2	0–1	2–1	2–1	0–0	3–0	2–1		3–1	1–1	1–1	0–1	1–0
Dep. Pasto			0–0		2–1			1–1					1–2	2–1	1–0	0–1
Dep. Pasto	1–5	0–0	1–2	2–1	2–1	2–2	1–0	2–0	2–2	4–2	0–2		3–1	2–0	0–0	1–1
Dep. Quindío			3–2		1–1			3–1				2–1		1–0	1–2	1–4
Dep. Quindío	0–3	2–1	1–3	1–1	4–3	1–1	1–1	2–0	0–3	2–2	0–0	4–2		1–1	3–1	1–3
R. Cartagena			0–1		3–2			2–1				2–2	2–0		3–2	0–0
R. Cartagena	1–1	1–0	0–1	3–2	2–2	1–0	0–2	0–2	1–1	1–2	3–0	2–1	1–0		2–0	2–0
Santa Fe			2–1		0–1			0–1				2–0	1–1	0–0		2–5
Santa Fe	4–1	5–1	2–1	3–3	4–2	0–0	0–0	3–1	0–0	1–0	1–0	1–1	3–0	1–0		2–1
Tolima			3–1		2–2			2–2				1–0	2–1	1–0	2–3	
Tolima	2–0	1–0	3–0	1–0	3–1	1–0	2–3	1–3	1–1	0–0	1–0	5–2	3–0	1–0	1–0	

Source: RSSSF
Legend: Blue = home team win; Yellow = draw; Red = away team win.

== Final stage ==
In the third stage of the tournament, the four qualified teams played each other under a double round-robin system with the team with the most points at the end of this stage being declared as the champion.

Pos	Team	Pld	W	D	L	GF	GA	GD	Pts	Qualification	AME	JUN	TOL	SFE
1	América de Cali (C)	6	3	1	2	7	3	+4	10		—	2–0	2–0	3–1
2	Junior	6	2	3	1	6	6	0	9	Qualification for the Copa Libertadores	0–0	—	1–0	4–3
3	Deportes Tolima	6	2	1	3	5	6	−1	7		1–0	0–0	—	3–1
4	Santa Fe	6	2	1	3	9	12	−3	7		1–0	1–1	2–1	—

Source: RSSSF
Rules for classification: 1) Points, 2) Wins, 3) Goal difference, 4) Goals for, 5) Away goals for, 6) Goals against, 7) Away goals against, 8) Drawing of lots.
(C) Champions

== Top goalscorers ==
Rank	Name	Club	Goals
1	(Colombia) Carlos Castro	Millonarios	24
2	(Colombia) Julián Vásquez	Envigado	23
3	(Argentina) Sergio Galván Rey	Once Caldas	20
3	(Colombia) Iván René Valenciano	Independiente Medellín / Atlético Bucaramanga	20
5	(Colombia) Néstor Salazar	América de Cali	19
6	(Brazil) Marcos Cardoso	Junior	17
7	(Colombia) Orlando Ballesteros	Junior	16
8	(Colombia) Hugo Arrieta	Deportes Tolima	16
9	(Colombia) Léider Preciado	Santa Fe	15
9	(Colombia) Ricardo Ciciliano	Deportivo Pasto / Deportes Quindío	15

Source: RSSSF
