= Marcelo Suárez =

Marcelo Suárez may refer to:

- Marcelo Suárez (footballer, born 1970), Uruguayan footballer and manager
- Marcelo Suárez (footballer, born 2001), Bolivian footballer

== See also ==
- Marcelo Suárez-Orozco, Argentine-American academic
