= 1998 Categoría Primera A season =

Football competition

Copa Mustang
- Season: 1998
- Dates: 1 February – 20 December 1998
- Champions: Deportivo Cali (7th title)
- Relegated: Deportivo Unicosta
- Copa Libertadores: Deportivo Cali; Once Caldas
- Copa CONMEBOL: Atlético Huila
- Matches: 426
- Goals: 1,134 (2.66 per match)
- Top goalscorer: Víctor Bonilla (36 goals)

The 1998 Categoría Primera A season, known as Copa Mustang 1998 for sponsoring purposes, was the 51st season of the Categoría Primera A, Colombia's top-flight football league. The season started on 1 February and ended on 20 December 1998. Deportivo Cali were the champions, clinching their seventh domestic league title after beating Once Caldas in the finals.

América de Cali were the defending champions, but placed third in their semifinal group and thus failed to qualify for the final stage of the competition.

== Format ==
The competition returned to its usual calendar year system, following the year-and-a-half tournament played in 1996–97, and was split into four stages: the Apertura and Finalización tournaments, the semifinals, and the finals. In the Apertura tournament, the 16 teams played each other under a double round-robin format as well as six additional rounds divided into regional groups for a total of 36 games, whilst the Finalización tournament had 14 rounds with the teams being divided into two groups of eight. An aggregate table considering the results of both tournaments was used to decide the eight teams that would advance to the semifinals, with the top four of said table receiving bonus points to be applied in the next stage of the competition. In the semifinals, the eight qualified teams were split into two groups of four and played each one of their group rivals twice, with the winners of each group playing a final series over two legs to decide the champions of the season. In the event that both teams tied on points at the end of the second leg of the finals, a tiebreaker match on neutral ground would be played. The winners of the Apertura tournament and the season champions qualified for the 1999 Copa Libertadores, but since Once Caldas won both tournaments of the season and also advanced to the final, then the other finalist (Deportivo Cali) also qualified for the Copa Libertadores.

This was the last tournament in which teams were awarded bonus points, as well as the last one in which draws triggered a penalty shoot-out, in which the winning side ended up earning an additional point.

== Teams ==
16 teams competed in the season, the top 15 teams of the relegation table of the 1996–97 season and Atlético Huila, who were promoted as champions of the 1997 Categoría Primera B tournament, replacing Deportivo Pereira who were relegated at the end of the previous season.

Locations of the 1998 Categoría Primera A teams

Team	Home city	Stadium	Capacity
América de Cali	Cali	Pascual Guerrero	45,625
Atlético Bucaramanga	Bucaramanga	Alfonso López	28,000
Atlético Huila	Neiva	Guillermo Plazas Alcid	22,000
Atlético Nacional	Medellín	Atanasio Girardot	52,000
Cortuluá	Tuluá	Doce de Octubre	16,000
Deportes Quindío	Armenia	Centenario	29,000
Deportes Tolima	Ibagué	Manuel Murillo Toro	28,100
Deportivo Cali	Cali	Pascual Guerrero	45,625
Deportivo Unicosta	Barranquilla	Romelio Martínez	20,000
Envigado	Envigado	Polideportivo Sur	11,000
Independiente Medellín	Medellín	Atanasio Girardot	52,000
Junior	Barranquilla	Metropolitano Roberto Meléndez	60,000
Millonarios	Bogotá	Nemesio Camacho El Campín	48,300
Once Caldas	Manizales	Palogrande	36,553
Santa Fe	Bogotá	Nemesio Camacho El Campín	48,300
Unión Magdalena	Santa Marta	Eduardo Santos	23,000

== Torneo Apertura ==
The Torneo Apertura (also known as Copa Mustang I) began on 1 February and ended in late September.

=== Standings ===
Pos	Team	Pld	W	PW	PL	L	GF	GA	GD	Pts	Qualification
1	Once Caldas	36	21	4	6	5	66	34	+32	77	Qualification for the Copa Libertadores
2	Atlético Nacional	36	17	7	4	8	63	35	+28	69	
3	Santa Fe	36	17	6	5	8	48	32	+16	68	
4	Independiente Medellín	36	16	4	8	8	51	29	+22	64	
5	Deportivo Cali	36	15	6	4	11	60	49	+11	61	
6	América de Cali	36	11	10	5	10	54	39	+15	58	
7	Junior	36	11	8	6	11	51	55	−4	55	
8	Atlético Huila	36	13	4	7	12	54	47	+7	54	
9	Millonarios	36	11	6	8	11	42	43	−1	53	
10	Deportes Tolima	36	9	11	2	14	42	51	−9	51	
11	Deportes Quindío	36	11	4	8	13	43	47	−4	49	
12	Cortuluá	36	10	5	7	14	42	59	−17	47	
13	Envigado	36	11	4	5	16	40	50	−10	46	
14	Atlético Bucaramanga	36	10	4	8	14	37	54	−17	46	
15	Unión Magdalena	36	7	6	3	20	40	72	−32	36	
16	Deportivo Unicosta	36	8	1	4	23	42	79	−37	30	

Source: RSSSF
Rules for classification: 1) Points, 2) Wins, 3) Goal difference, 4) Goals for, 5) Away goals for, 6) Goals against, 7) Away goals against, 8) Drawing of lots.

== Torneo Finalización ==
The Torneo Finalización (also known as Copa Mustang II) began in early October and ended on 19 November. Teams were divided into two groups according to their placement in the Apertura tournament: odd-placed teams made up Group A while even-placed ones made up Group B.

=== Group A ===
Pos	Team	Pld	W	PW	PL	L	GF	GA	GD	Pts
1	Once Caldas	14	8	4	1	1	27	11	+16	33
2	Deportes Quindío	14	6	4	1	3	25	18	+7	27
3	Deportivo Cali	14	6	2	3	3	17	12	+5	25
4	Envigado	14	5	3	2	4	14	14	0	23
5	Millonarios	14	5	2	3	4	15	16	−1	22
6	Unión Magdalena	14	4	0	3	7	18	24	−6	15
7	Santa Fe	14	2	1	4	7	8	19	−11	12
8	Junior	14	1	3	2	8	20	30	−10	11

Source: RSSSF
Rules for classification: 1) Points, 2) Wins, 3) Goal difference, 4) Goals for, 5) Away goals for, 6) Goals against, 7) Away goals against, 8) Drawing of lots.

=== Group B ===
Pos	Team	Pld	W	PW	PL	L	GF	GA	GD	Pts
1	Atlético Nacional	14	8	4	1	1	30	16	+14	33
2	Independiente Medellín	14	7	3	2	2	28	16	+12	29
3	Cortuluá	14	4	3	4	3	22	20	+2	22
4	Atlético Bucaramanga	14	4	3	3	4	22	21	+1	21
5	Deportes Tolima	14	3	4	3	4	15	19	−4	20
6	América de Cali	14	5	0	4	5	17	20	−3	19
7	Atlético Huila	14	4	2	1	7	20	21	−1	17
8	Deportivo Unicosta	14	2	0	1	11	15	36	−21	7

Source: RSSSF
Rules for classification: 1) Points, 2) Wins, 3) Goal difference, 4) Goals for, 5) Away goals for, 6) Goals against, 7) Away goals against, 8) Drawing of lots.

== Aggregate table ==
An aggregate table known as Reclasificación including the games of both tournaments (Apertura and Finalización) was used to determine the teams that would advance to the semifinal stage, as well as the team to be relegated at the end of the season. The top eight teams in this table at the end of the Torneo Finalización advanced to the semifinals, while the team placed last was relegated to Categoría Primera B for the following season.

Pos	Team	Pld	W	PW	PL	L	GF	GA	GD	Pts	Qualification or relegation
1	Once Caldas	50	29	8	7	6	94	46	+48	110	Advance to the semifinals
2	Atlético Nacional	50	25	11	5	9	93	52	+41	102	Advance to the semifinals
3	Independiente Medellín	50	23	7	10	10	80	45	+35	93	Advance to the semifinals
4	Deportivo Cali	50	21	8	7	14	77	61	+16	86	Advance to the semifinals
5	Santa Fe	50	19	7	9	15	56	49	+7	80	Advance to the semifinals
6	América de Cali	50	16	10	9	15	70	59	+11	77	Advance to the semifinals
7	Deportes Quindío	50	17	8	9	16	68	65	+3	76	Advance to the semifinals
8	Millonarios	50	16	8	11	15	57	59	−2	75	Advance to the semifinals
9	Atlético Huila	50	17	6	8	19	74	68	+6	71	Qualified for the Copa CONMEBOL
10	Deportes Tolima	50	12	15	5	18	57	70	−13	71	
11	Envigado	50	16	7	7	20	55	64	−9	69	
12	Cortuluá	50	14	8	11	17	64	79	−15	69	
13	Atlético Bucaramanga	50	14	7	11	18	59	75	−16	67	
14	Junior	50	12	11	8	19	72	88	−16	66	
15	Unión Magdalena	50	11	6	6	27	58	96	−38	51	
16	Deportivo Unicosta (R)	50	10	1	5	34	57	115	−58	37	Relegation to Categoría Primera B

Source: RSSSF
Rules for classification: 1) Points, 2) Wins, 3) Goal difference, 4) Goals for, 5) Away goals for, 6) Goals against, 7) Away goals against, 8) Drawing of lots.
(R) Relegated

== Semifinals ==
In the third stage of the tournament, the eight qualified teams were split into two groups according to their final position in the season's aggregate table, and played each one of the other teams in their group under a double round-robin system with the teams with the most points in each group at the end of this stage advancing to the final.

=== Group A ===
Pos	Team	Pld	W	PW	PL	L	GF	GA	GD	Pts	Qualification	ONC	DIM	QUI	SFE
1	Once Caldas	6	3	2	0	1	7	5	+2	14.5 (Note: Aggregate table bonus: 1.5 points)	Advance to the Finals	—	1–0	1–1 (5–4 p)	2–1
2	Independiente Medellín	6	4	0	0	2	7	7	0	13 (Note: Aggregate table bonus: 1 point)		1–0	—	1–0	1–0
3	Deportes Quindío	6	2	0	2	2	7	7	0	8		1–1 (4–5 p)	4–1	—	3–2
4	Santa Fe	6	1	0	0	5	9	11	−2	3		1–2	2–3	1–0	—

Source: RSSSF
Rules for classification: 1) Points, 2) Wins, 3) Goal difference, 4) Goals for, 5) Away goals for, 6) Goals against, 7) Away goals against, 8) Bonus points.

=== Group B ===
Pos	Team	Pld	W	PW	PL	L	GF	GA	GD	Pts	Qualification	CAL	NAC	AME	MIL
1	Deportivo Cali	6	3	1	2	0	13	6	+7	13.75 (Note: Aggregate table bonus: 0.75 points)	Finals and Copa Libertadores	—	1–1 (1–4 p)	3–1	3–0
2	Atlético Nacional	6	1	2	1	2	8	9	−1	9.25 (Note: Aggregate table bonus: 1.25 points)		2–2 (4–3 p)	—	1–3	3–1
3	América de Cali	6	2	0	2	2	9	10	−1	8		2–2 (1–3 p)	1–0	—	1–3
4	Millonarios	6	1	2	0	3	6	11	−5	7		0–2	1–1 (4–3 p)	1–1 (4–3 p)	—

Source: RSSSF
Rules for classification: 1) Points, 2) Wins, 3) Goal difference, 4) Goals for, 5) Away goals for, 6) Goals against, 7) Away goals against, 8) Bonus points.

== Finals ==
16 December 1998

Deportivo Cali	4–0	Once Caldas
Bonilla; Castillo

Estadio Pascual Guerrero, Cali
Attendance: 35,000
Referee: Henry Cervantes
20 December 1998

Once Caldas	0–0	Deportivo Cali

Estadio Palogrande, Manizales
Referee: Óscar Ruiz

Deportivo Cali won 4–1 on points.

== Top goalscorers ==
Rank	Name	Club	Goals
1	(Colombia) Víctor Bonilla	Deportivo Cali	36
2	(Argentina) Sergio Galván Rey	Once Caldas	29
3	(Argentina) Héctor Mario Núñez	Independiente Medellín	26
3	(Colombia) Adolfo Valencia	Independiente Medellín	26
5	(Colombia) Alex Comas	Atlético Nacional	25
6	(Colombia) Carlos Rodas	Deportes Quindío	21
7	(Colombia) Edwin Congo	Once Caldas	20
8	(Colombia) José Herrera	Unión Magdalena	19
8	(Argentina) Daniel Tilger	Junior	19

Source: Historia del Fútbol Profesional Colombiano 70 Años
