= Marcelo Suárez (footballer, born 1970) =

Uruguayan footballer (born 1970)

Personal information
- Full name: Marcelo Fabián Suárez Campos
- Date of birth: 12 February 1970 (age 56)
- Place of birth: Montevideo, Uruguay
- Height: 1.70 m (5 ft 7 in)
- Position: Forward

Senior career*
Years	Team	Apps	(Gls)
1989–1995	Progreso		
1996	Central Español		
1996	Venados		
1997	Rentistas		
1998	Deportivo Unicosta		
1999	River Plate Montevideo		
2000	Huachipato	21	(9)
2001	Liverpool Montevideo		
2001	Tianjin Teda	9	(3)
2002	Deportes Puerto Montt		
2003	Everton		
2004	Deportes La Serena	9	(0)
2004	Unión La Calera		
2005	Deportes Arica	19	(6)
2006–2007	San Marcos	–	(–)
2008–2009	La Luz	7	(4)

Managerial career
- 2001–2012: Progreso (assistant)
- 2012–2015: Danubio (assistant)
- 2016: Unión La Calera (assistant)
- 2016: Danubio (assistant)
- 2017–2018: Peñarol (assistant)
- 2019: Uruguay Montevideo
- 2020: Rivera Hinterland
- 2020–2022: Rocha
- 2022: Rampla Juniors
- 2024: Vicente Pérez Rosales
- * Club domestic league appearances and goals

Marcelo Fabián Suárez Campos (born February 12, 1970, in Montevideo, Uruguay) is a Uruguayan football manager and former footballer who played for clubs of Uruguay, Chile, Mexico and Colombia.

== Teams (Player) ==
- (Uruguay) Progreso 1989–1995
- (Uruguay) Central Español 1996
- (Mexico) Venados de Yucatán 1996
- (Uruguay) Rentistas 1997
- (Colombia) Unicosta de Barranquilla 1998
- (Uruguay) River Plate 1999
- (Chile) Huachipato 2000
- (Uruguay) Liverpool 2001
- (China) Tianjin Teda 2001
- (Chile) Deportes Puerto Montt 2002
- (Chile) Everton de Viña del Mar 2003
- (Chile) Deportes La Serena 2004
- (Chile) Unión La Calera 2004
- (Chile) San Marcos de Arica 2005–2007
- (Uruguay) La Luz 2008–2009

== Teams (Coach) ==
- (Chile) Vicente Pérez Rosales 2024

== Titles ==
- (Uruguay) Progreso 1989 (Uruguayan Primera División Championship)
- (Chile) Deportes Puerto Montt 2002 (Chilean Primera B Championship)
