= 1996–97 Categoría Primera A season =

Football competition

Copa Mustang
- Season: 1996–97
- Dates: 8 September 1996 – 21 December 1997
- Champions: América de Cali (9th title)
- Relegated: Cúcuta Deportivo (Torneo Finalización); Deportivo Pereira (Torneo Adecuación)
- 1998 Copa Libertadores: América de Cali; Atlético Bucaramanga
- 1997 Copa CONMEBOL: América de Cali; Deportes Tolima
- 1998 Copa CONMEBOL: Deportes Quindío; Once Caldas
- Matches: 584
- Goals: 1,479 (2.53 per match)
- Top goalscorer: Hámilton Ricard (36 goals)

The 1996–97 Categoría Primera A season, known as Copa Mustang 1996–97 for sponsoring purposes, was the 50th season of the Categoría Primera A, Colombia's top-flight football league. The season started on 8 September 1996 and ended on 21 December 1997. América de Cali were the champions, winning their ninth domestic league title after beating the Torneo Adecuación winners Atlético Bucaramanga in the championship playoff.

Deportivo Cali were the defending champions, but placed last in both the final group stage and the Adecuación semi-finals and thus failed to qualify for the finals of the competition.

== Format ==
The season, which was originally to last from September 1996 to June 1997, was initially split into three stages: the Apertura and Finalización tournaments, and the final group:

- In the Apertura tournament, played from September to February, the 16 teams played each other under a double round-robin format with two additional rounds of regional derbies for a total of 32 matches. Bonus points were awarded to the top four teams, with the first-placed side being awarded 2 bonus points, the runner-up 1 point, the third-placed team 0.5 points, and the fourth-placed team receiving 0.25 points. In addition to this, the team topping the table at the end of the tournament would be assured of a berth in the 1997 Copa CONMEBOL.
- The Finalización tournament, played from February to April, had 14 rounds with the teams being divided into two groups of eight, made up according to the placements of teams in the previous stage with odd-placed sides in one group and even-placed teams in the other one. An aggregate table considering the results of both tournaments was used to decide the four teams that would advance to the final stage, with no bonus points being awarded. The team with the lowest average would be relegated to Categoría Primera B.
- The final group was played by the top four teams in the aggregate table, which played each other twice for a total of 6 rounds. All teams started this round at 0 points, except for the top team in the aggregate table, which started with 1 point.

However, in January 1997 the Assembly of DIMAYOR approved the return of the league to the calendar year format, while also deciding that the season's champion would be defined in December rather than June as originally expected. Because of this, an additional tournament known as Torneo Adecuación was played from July to December 1997:

- In the first stage, the 16 teams were first split into two groups of eight where they played each one of their group rivals twice, and later into four groups of four where they played six additional matches. Bonus points were awarded to teams in both stages, and teams carried over their first stage performance to this second phase with the top eight teams advancing to the semi-final stage, whilst the bottom-placed side in the relegation table was relegated.
- In the semi-finals, the qualified teams were split into two groups of four with the winners of each group playing a final series over two legs to decide the Adecuación tournament winners, whilst the two group runners-up played a play-off series to qualify for the Copa CONMEBOL along with the Adecuación runners-up.
- Penalty shootouts were played in matches ending in draws, with the winning side earning an additional point.

The Adecuación winners would then play the winners of the final group (América de Cali) in another double-legged series to decide the season champions. In the event that both teams tied on points at the end of the second leg of the finals, a tiebreaker match on neutral ground would be played. Both season finalists qualified for the 1998 Copa Libertadores.

== Teams ==
16 teams originally competed in the season, the top 15 teams of the 1995–96 season and Cúcuta Deportivo, who were promoted as champions of the 1995–96 Categoría Primera B tournament, replacing Atlético Huila who were relegated at the end of the previous season. Cúcuta Deportivo were relegated to the second tier at the end of the Finalización tournament, being replaced by the 1996–97 Primera B champions Deportivo Unicosta for the Adecuación tournament, which brought the number of clubs that took part in the season up to 17.

Locations of the 1996–97 Categoría Primera A teams

Team	Home city	Stadium	Capacity
América de Cali	Cali	Pascual Guerrero	45,625
Atlético Bucaramanga	Bucaramanga	Alfonso López	28,000
Atlético Nacional	Medellín	Atanasio Girardot	52,000
Cortuluá	Tuluá	Doce de Octubre	16,000
Cúcuta Deportivo	Cúcuta	General Santander	22,000
Deportes Quindío	Armenia	Centenario	29,000
Deportes Tolima	Ibagué	Manuel Murillo Toro	28,100
Deportivo Cali	Cali	Pascual Guerrero	45,625
Deportivo Pereira	Pereira	Hernán Ramírez Villegas	30,000
Deportivo Unicosta	Barranquilla	Romelio Martínez	20,000
Envigado	Envigado	Polideportivo Sur	11,000
Independiente Medellín	Medellín	Atanasio Girardot	52,000
Junior	Barranquilla	Metropolitano Roberto Meléndez	60,000
Millonarios	Bogotá	Nemesio Camacho El Campín	48,300
Once Caldas	Manizales	Palogrande	36,553
Santa Fe	Bogotá	Nemesio Camacho El Campín	48,300
Unión Magdalena	Santa Marta	Eduardo Santos	23,000

== Torneo Apertura ==
The Torneo Apertura (also known as Copa Mustang I) began on 8 September 1996 and ended on 23 February 1997.

=== Standings ===
Pos	Team	Pld	W	D	L	GF	GA	GD	Pts	Qualification
1	América de Cali	32	21	8	3	52	22	+30	71	Qualification for the 1997 Copa CONMEBOL
2	Atlético Nacional	32	16	11	5	48	22	+26	59	
3	Deportivo Cali	32	16	9	7	52	37	+15	57	
4	Junior	32	13	9	10	53	40	+13	48	
5	Independiente Medellín	32	12	11	9	31	31	0	47	
6	Deportes Tolima	32	12	10	10	46	43	+3	46	
7	Santa Fe	32	11	11	10	34	31	+3	44	
8	Once Caldas	32	11	10	11	46	33	+13	43	
9	Envigado	32	10	12	10	41	37	+4	42	
10	Atlético Bucaramanga	32	10	12	10	37	39	−2	42	
11	Unión Magdalena	32	11	7	14	35	46	−11	40	
12	Cortuluá	32	7	16	9	29	34	−5	37	
13	Millonarios	32	6	10	16	30	41	−11	28	
14	Deportivo Pereira	32	5	13	14	39	55	−16	28	
15	Deportes Quindío	32	5	13	14	34	62	−28	28	
16	Cúcuta Deportivo	32	4	10	18	27	61	−34	22	

Source: RSSSF
Rules for classification: 1) Points, 2) Wins, 3) Goal difference, 4) Goals for, 5) Away goals for, 6) Goals against, 7) Away goals against, 8) Drawing of lots.

=== Results ===
Home \ Away	AME	BUC	CAL	COR	CUC	ENV	JUN	MAG	DIM	MIL	NAC	ONC	PER	QUI	SFE	TOL	CLR
América	—	2–0	1–1	2–1	3–0	1–1	2–0	3–0	5–0	1–0	3–2	2–1	2–1	2–0	1–0	0–0	1–3
Bucaramanga	1–1	—	1–0	2–1	3–1	3–1	2–2	0–1	0–0	1–1	1–0	0–1	3–1	1–1	1–0	1–5	1–0
Dep. Cali	0–1	2–2	—	3–0	2–1	2–1	2–0	2–1	4–2	2–1	0–3	2–1	3–0	2–0	1–0	1–0	2–1
Cortuluá	0–2	1–1	0–0	—	2–0	2–2	1–1	2–1	0–0	1–0	0–0	1–1	2–2	2–2	0–1	1–0	2–2
Cúcuta Dep.	0–2	1–2	2–1	1–2	—	0–1	0–0	2–0	0–0	2–0	1–3	1–2	2–2	1–1	2–2	0–2	2–1
Envigado F.C	1–2	3–2	2–2	0–0	3–0	—	1–2	1–0	1–1	2–1	1–0	0–0	2–2	0–0	1–0	3–0	4–2
Junior	0–1	1–0	5–3	1–1	4–1	1–1	—	1–1	1–0	3–0	0–1	3–1	4–1	7–1	4–1	2–2	1–0
U. Magdalena	2–2	2–1	2–0	1–1	0–0	1–0	3–0	—	1–2	2–1	1–1	1–1	2–1	3–1	1–1	3–1	1–0
Ind. Medellín	0–1	0–0	0–1	1–1	0–0	1–0	3–3	2–0	—	1–0	0–0	2–1	2–0	1–0	1–1	1–3	0–0
Millonarios	2–1	0–0	1–1	1–2	3–0	0–0	2–3	3–0	0–1	—	0–0	0–0	4–3	2–1	2–1	0–0	0–1
Atl. Nacional	1–1	0–0	1–1	1–1	3–0	2–2	2–1	1–0	1–0	2–0	—	0–0	2–0	3–1	3–0	1–2	0–2
Once Caldas	1–2	3–1	1–1	1–0	7–0	2–0	1–0	3–0	1–2	3–1	1–3	—	1–2	3–0	1–1	3–0	0–0
Dep. Pereira	0–1	4–2	0–0	1–1	3–3	1–3	0–1	1–2	2–3	1–1	1–3	1–1	—	2–0	0–0	1–1	3–2
Dep. Quindío	1–1	1–1	2–6	1–0	2–2	0–0	2–2	3–2	1–0	3–2	0–4	2–1	2–2	—	0–2	2–3	0–1
Ind. Santa Fe	0–0	0–2	3–1	2–0	3–1	3–2	1–0	4–0	0–1	1–1	1–2	1–1	0–0	0–0	—	1–1	1–0
Dep. Tolima	1–2	1–1	1–1	1–0	1–1	1–0	2–0	4–1	3–2	1–1	1–3	1–0	0–1	2–2	1–2	—	3–2
Classic Rival	2–1	2–1	1–3	0–1	1–0	3–2	1–0	1–0	0–2	1–0	0–0	3–2	0–0	2–2	0–1	4–2	—

Updated to match(es) played on 4 May 2025. Source:
Legend: Blue = home team win; Yellow = draw; Red = away team win.
For upcoming matches, an "a" indicates there is an article about the rivalry between the two participants.

== Torneo Finalización ==
The Torneo Finalización (also known as Copa Mustang II) began on 26 February 1997 and ended on 20 April 1997. An aggregate table known as Reclasificación including the games of both tournaments (Apertura and Finalización) was used to determine the teams that would advance to the Copa Mustang final stage, as well as the first team to be relegated to Categoría Primera B for the following season.

=== Aggregate table ===
Pos	Team	Pld	W	D	L	GF	GA	GD	Pts	Qualification or relegation
1	América de Cali	46	29	10	7	70	37	+33	99 (Note: Apertura bonus points: América de Cali 2, Atlético Nacional 1, Deportivo Cali 0.5, Junior 0.25)	Advance to the Final group
2	Atlético Nacional	46	24	14	8	73	37	+36	87	Advance to the Final group
3	Deportivo Cali	46	23	13	10	77	54	+23	82.5	Advance to the Final group
4	Deportes Tolima	46	18	16	12	61	54	+7	70	Advance to the Final group
5	Independiente Medellín	46	18	16	12	49	44	+5	70	
6	Unión Magdalena	46	20	9	17	55	61	−6	69	
7	Junior	46	18	11	17	65	58	+7	65.25	
8	Atlético Bucaramanga	46	17	13	16	59	59	0	64	
9	Cortuluá	46	15	18	13	50	49	+1	63	
10	Once Caldas	46	15	15	16	63	48	+15	60	
11	Santa Fe	46	14	14	18	47	52	−5	56	
12	Envigado	46	13	15	18	55	55	0	54	
13	Deportes Quindío	46	11	15	20	57	85	−28	48	
14	Deportivo Pereira	46	8	16	22	58	82	−24	40	
15	Millonarios	46	8	13	25	45	65	−20	37	
16	Cúcuta Deportivo (R)	46	5	16	25	36	80	−44	31	Relegation to Categoría Primera B

Source: RSSSF
Rules for classification: 1) Points, 2) Wins, 3) Goal difference, 4) Goals for, 5) Away goals for, 6) Goals against, 7) Away goals against, 8) Drawing of lots.
(R) Relegated

== Final group ==
In the third stage of the tournament, the four qualified teams played each other under a double round-robin system with the team with the most points at the end of this stage advancing to the championship playoff and qualifying for the 1998 Copa Libertadores. The final group's runner-up qualified for the 1997 Copa CONMEBOL.

Pos	Team	Pld	W	D	L	GF	GA	GD	Pts	Qualification	AME	TOL	NAC	CAL
1	América de Cali	6	2	3	1	9	4	+5	10 (Note: Aggregate table bonus: 1 point)	Advance to Championship playoff and Copa Libertadores	—	0–0	4–0	1–1
2	Deportes Tolima	6	2	3	1	6	3	+3	9	Qualification for the 1997 Copa CONMEBOL	0–0	—	0–1	3–1
3	Atlético Nacional	6	3	0	3	8	11	−3	9		3–1	1–3	—	2–1
4	Deportivo Cali	6	1	2	3	5	10	−5	5		0–3	0–0	2–1	—

Source: RSSSF
Rules for classification: 1) Points, 2) Wins, 3) Goal difference, 4) Goals for, 5) Away goals for, 6) Goals against, 7) Away goals against, 8) Drawing of lots.

== Torneo Adecuación ==
The Torneo Adecuación began on 10 July 1997 and ended on 13 December 1997.

=== First group stage ===
==== Group A ====
Pos	Team	Pld	W	PW	PL	L	GF	GA	GD	Pts
1	Deportes Quindío	16	9	0	4	3	24	16	+8	31
2	Atlético Bucaramanga	16	7	1	4	4	22	17	+5	27
3	Deportes Tolima	16	4	6	2	4	11	13	−2	26
4	Junior	16	6	2	2	6	23	22	+1	24
5	Once Caldas	16	2	7	4	3	18	22	−4	24
6	América de Cali	16	6	1	3	6	20	20	0	23
7	Santa Fe	16	5	2	4	5	19	20	−1	23
8	Independiente Medellín	16	3	0	2	11	16	27	−11	11

Source: RSSSF
Rules for classification: 1) Points, 2) Wins, 3) Goal difference, 4) Goals for, 5) Away goals for, 6) Goals against, 7) Away goals against, 8) Drawing of lots.

==== Group B ====
Pos	Team	Pld	W	PW	PL	L	GF	GA	GD	Pts
1	Deportivo Cali	16	9	3	0	4	29	19	+10	33
2	Millonarios	16	8	4	1	3	21	11	+10	33
3	Unión Magdalena	16	8	1	2	5	26	22	+4	28
4	Atlético Nacional	16	7	0	3	6	22	21	+1	24
5	Envigado	16	4	5	2	5	13	15	−2	24
6	Cortuluá	16	4	3	4	5	15	16	−1	22
7	Deportivo Pereira	16	3	2	4	7	17	20	−3	17
8	Deportivo Unicosta	16	2	4	0	10	14	29	−15	14

Source: RSSSF
Rules for classification: 1) Points, 2) Wins, 3) Goal difference, 4) Goals for, 5) Away goals for, 6) Goals against, 7) Away goals against, 8) Drawing of lots.

=== Second group stage ===
==== Group A ====
Pos	Team	Pld	W	PW	PL	L	GF	GA	GD	Pts	Qualification
1	Deportivo Cali	22	12	5	0	5	39	26	+13	47 (Note: First stage bonus: 1 point)	Advance to the Semi-finals
2	Atlético Bucaramanga	22	10	1	5	6	35	28	+7	37.75 (Note: First stage bonus: 0.75 points)	Advance to the Semi-finals
3	Santa Fe	22	6	3	6	7	27	31	−4	30	
4	Independiente Medellín	22	3	2	4	13	26	39	−13	17	

Source: RSSSF
Rules for classification: 1) Points, 2) Wins, 3) Goal difference, 4) Goals for, 5) Away goals for, 6) Goals against, 7) Away goals against, 8) Bonus points.

==== Group B ====
Pos	Team	Pld	W	PW	PL	L	GF	GA	GD	Pts	Qualification
1	Millonarios	22	11	5	1	5	34	22	+12	44.75 (Note: First stage bonus: 0.75 points)	Advance to the Semi-finals
2	América de Cali	22	8	2	5	7	31	28	+3	33	
3	Deportes Tolima	22	5	7	3	7	18	25	−7	32.5 (Note: First stage bonus: 0.5 points)	
4	Deportivo Unicosta	22	4	5	1	12	24	39	−15	23	

Source: RSSSF
Rules for classification: 1) Points, 2) Wins, 3) Goal difference, 4) Goals for, 5) Away goals for, 6) Goals against, 7) Away goals against, 8) Bonus points.

==== Group C ====
Pos	Team	Pld	W	PW	PL	L	GF	GA	GD	Pts	Qualification
1	Atlético Nacional	22	11	1	3	7	37	29	+8	38.25 (Note: First stage bonus: 0.25 points)	Advance to the Semi-finals
2	Once Caldas	22	6	7	5	4	31	29	+2	37	Advance to the Semi-finals
3	Deportes Quindío	22	9	1	5	7	29	27	+2	35 (Note: First stage bonus: 1 point)	Advance to the Semi-finals
4	Deportivo Pereira (R)	22	5	2	4	11	25	35	−10	23	Relegation by average to Categoría Primera B

Source: RSSSF
Rules for classification: 1) Points, 2) Wins, 3) Goal difference, 4) Goals for, 5) Away goals for, 6) Goals against, 7) Away goals against, 8) Bonus points.
(R) Relegated

==== Group D ====
Pos	Team	Pld	W	PW	PL	L	GF	GA	GD	Pts	Qualification
1	Junior	22	10	2	3	7	32	26	+6	37.25 (Note: First stage bonus: 0.25 points)	Advance to the Semi-finals
2	Cortuluá	22	7	5	4	6	25	25	0	35	Advance to the Semi-finals
3	Unión Magdalena	22	9	1	3	9	33	31	+2	32.5 (Note: First stage bonus: 0.5 points)	
4	Envigado	22	5	6	3	8	18	24	−6	30	

Source: RSSSF
Rules for classification: 1) Points, 2) Wins, 3) Goal difference, 4) Goals for, 5) Away goals for, 6) Goals against, 7) Away goals against, 8) Bonus points.

=== Semi-finals ===
In the third stage of the tournament, the eight qualified teams were split into two groups, and played each one of the other teams in their group under a double round-robin system with the teams with the most points in each group at the end of this stage advancing to the final. The group runners-up advanced to the third place play-off.

==== Group A ====
Pos	Team	Pld	W	PW	PL	L	GF	GA	GD	Pts	Qualification	QUI	ONC	NAC	CAL
1	Deportes Quindío	6	3	1	1	1	8	5	+3	12	Advance to the Finals	—	1–1 (4–3 p)	0–0 (4–5 p)	2–1
2	Once Caldas	6	3	0	1	2	7	6	+1	10	Advance to the Third place play-off	2–1	—	2–1	1–2
3	Atlético Nacional	6	2	1	0	3	6	8	−2	8		0–1	1–0	—	2–1
4	Deportivo Cali	6	2	0	0	4	9	11	−2	6		1–3	0–1	4–2	—

Source: RSSSF
Rules for classification: 1) Points, 2) Wins, 3) Goal difference, 4) Goals for, 5) Away goals for, 6) Goals against, 7) Away goals against, 8) Bonus points.

==== Group B ====
Pos	Team	Pld	W	PW	PL	L	GF	GA	GD	Pts	Qualification	BUC	MIL	COR	JUN
1	Atlético Bucaramanga	6	2	3	1	0	9	3	+6	13	Advance to the Finals	—	1–1 (3–4 p)	1–1 (6–5 p)	2–0
2	Millonarios	6	2	3	1	0	9	5	+4	13	Advance to the Third place play-off	0–0 (4–5 p)	—	4–1	3–2
3	Cortuluá	6	0	1	3	2	6	10	−4	5		1–1 (2–3 p)	1–1 (2–3 p)	—	1–1 (4–3 p)
4	Junior	6	1	0	2	3	5	11	−6	5		0–4	0–0 (3–4 p)	2–1	—

Source: RSSSF
Rules for classification: 1) Points, 2) Wins, 3) Goal difference, 4) Goals for, 5) Away goals for, 6) Goals against, 7) Away goals against, 8) Bonus points.

=== Third place play-off ===
10 December 1997

Millonarios	2–1	Once Caldas
Villarreal 4', 54'		Galván Rey 1'

Estadio El Campín, Bogotá
13 December 1997

Once Caldas	3–0	Millonarios
Valentierra 10' (pen.); Galván Rey 32', 46'

Estadio Palogrande, Manizales

Tied 3–3 on points, Millonarios won on bonus points and qualified for the 1998 Copa CONMEBOL. Millonarios eventually declined to take part in the Copa CONMEBOL upon being invited to compete in the 1998 Copa Merconorte, thus yielding the berth to Once Caldas.

=== Finals ===
10 December 1997

Atlético Bucaramanga	2–1	Deportes Quindío
Restrepo 34' (pen.); Ballesteros 35'		Marrero 67' (pen.)

Estadio Alfonso López, Bucaramanga
13 December 1997

Deportes Quindío	1–1	Atlético Bucaramanga
Marrero 59' (pen.)		Ballesteros 90'

Estadio Centenario, Armenia

Atlético Bucaramanga won 4–1 on points, advanced to the championship playoff and qualified for the 1998 Copa Libertadores. Deportes Quindío qualified for the 1998 Copa CONMEBOL.

== Championship playoff ==
17 December 1997

Atlético Bucaramanga	0–1	América de Cali
		Castillo 66'

Estadio Alfonso López, Bucaramanga
21 December 1997

América de Cali	2–0	Atlético Bucaramanga
Valencia 43'; Téllez 75'

Estadio Pascual Guerrero, Cali

América de Cali won 6–0 on points.

== Top goalscorers ==
Rank	Name	Club	Goals
1	(Colombia) Hámilton Ricard	Deportivo Cali	36
2	(Colombia) Arnulfo Valentierra	Once Caldas	33
3	(Colombia) Jorge Ramírez Quesada	Deportes Tolima	27
4	(Colombia) Carlos Rodas	Deportivo Pereira	26
5	(Colombia) Edison Mafla	Deportivo Cali	25
6	(Argentina) Sergio Galván Rey	Once Caldas	23
7	(Colombia) Luis Zuleta	Unión Magdalena	20
8	(Colombia) Bernardo Redín	Deportes Quindío	18
8	(Uruguay) Jorge Villar	Unión Magdalena	18
10	(Colombia) Juan Pablo Ángel	Atlético Nacional	17

Source: Historia del Fútbol Profesional Colombiano 70 Años
