= Sergio Galván Rey =

Argentine footballer

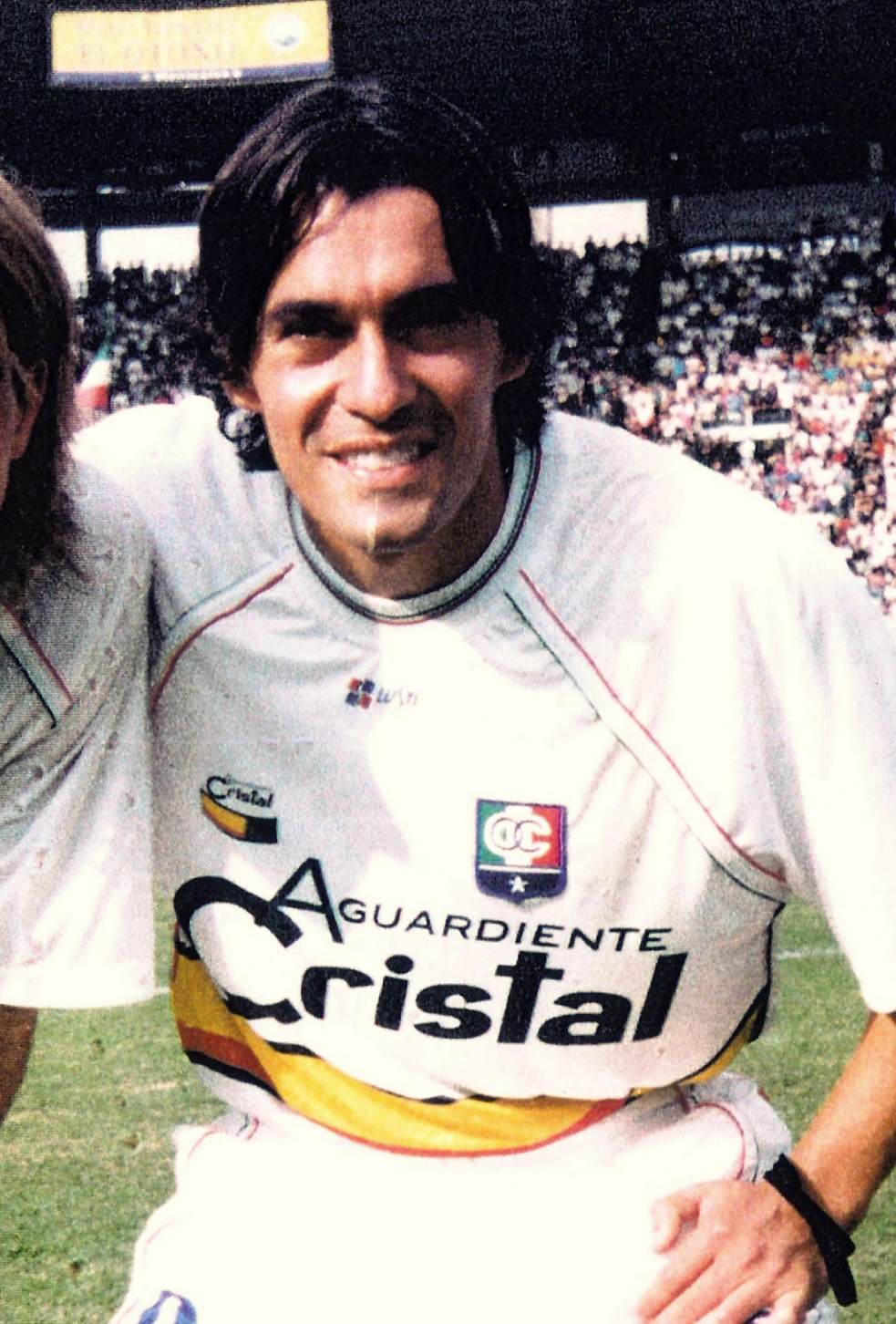

Personal information
- Full name: Sergio Alejandro Galvan Rey
- Date of birth: 9 June 1973 (age 53)
- Place of birth: Concepción, Argentina
- Height: 1.71 m (5 ft 7 1/2 in)
- Position: Striker

Youth career
- 1993–1995: Boca Juniors

Senior career*
Years	Team	Apps	(Gls)
1993–1995	Boca Juniors	0	(0)
1995	→ Concepción (loan)	0	(0)
1996–2004	Once Caldas	255	(160)
2004–2005	MetroStars	47	(9)
2006–2009	Atlético Nacional	93	(53)
2010	América de Cali	33	(8)
2011	Santa Fe	23	(3)
Total		451	(233)
- * Club domestic league appearances and goals

Sergio Alejandro Galván Rey (born 9 June 1973) is an Argentine former footballer who played as a forward. He is the second top goalscorer of the Colombian Categoría Primera A with 224 goals.

== Club career ==
Galván Rey's first club was Boca Juniors of his native Argentina, where he did not achieve much success. Galván Rey joined Colombian club Once Caldas in 1996, and proceeded to become one of the most dangerous forwards in Colombia. He scored 171 goals in his career with Once Caldas, 160 in the Colombian league, and 11 in 15 Copa Libertadores matches. In 2003, Galván Rey helped Once Caldas to win the Colombian championship, their first in 53 years; additionally, he led the team to achieve Copa Libertadores qualification in 1999, 2002, and 2004.

For the 2004 MLS season, Once Caldas sold Galván Rey to the MetroStars for a transfer fee in the range of half a million dollars. Although he played in 20 games, starting 10, Galván Rey finished the year with only two goals and one assist. Galván Rey's previous club, Once Caldas, went on to win the Copa Libertadores in his absence.

In 2005 Galván Rey played better than the previous year, scoring two goals against the Kansas City Wizards to bring the MetroStars back from a 2–0 deficit. By the end of the season, he tallied eight goals in all competitions, which had him tied for the team's third leading scorer. However, his salary demands were overwhelming, and the MetroStars decided not to bring Galván Rey back for 2006. He then signed with Atlético Nacional.

In the first half of the 2006 season at Atlético Nacional, Sergio Galván Rey tallied 11 goals. He put his renewed form on display against América de Cali on 21 May scoring five goals in a single match. Galván Rey finished the 2006 campaign with a total of 19 goals. His last goal of the season came on 2 December 2006 against Boyacá Chicó F.C. in a 2–1 win for Nacional.

The 2007 season started well for Galván Rey when he netted a goal in Nacional's first match against La Equidad. He managed to tally a total of 13 goals in the first half of the season with his last goal coming during a tournament match against Boyacá Chicó on 10 June 2007. He tallied six more goals through December 2007. He scored two against Cucuta Deportivo on 8 December 2007.

In 2008, Galván Rey started the season with four goals through July. Entering November 2008, he added seven more goals to his season total.

In 2010, Galván Rey joined América de Cali. He started the season only five goals away from becoming the all time scorer in Colombian League history. On 25 April, he became the highest scorer in the Colombian League, surpassing Iván Valenciano as the all time scorer.

In 2011, he joined Independiente Santa Fe and played one season with them, scoring three goals in 23 appearances. He announced his retirement after the season ended.

== Honours ==
Once Caldas

- Categoría Primera A: 2003–I
- Copa Libertadores: 2004

Atlético Nacional

- Categoría Primera A: 2007–I, 2007–II

Individual

- Categoría Primera A Top Scorer: 1999, 2007 Apertura
