= Deportivo Unicosta =

Colombian football club

- Full name: Corporación Deportiva de la Costa
- Nickname(s): El Único (The Only One); La U de la Costa (The Coast's "U")
- Founded: 1995
- Dissolved: 1999
- Ground: Estadio Romelio Martínez
- Capacity: 20,000
- Chairman: Enrique Chapman
Home colours	Away colours

Corporación Deportiva de la Costa, better known as Deportivo Unicosta or Unicosta, was a professional Colombian football club based in Barranquilla, that played in the Categoría Primera A until its 1998 season. They played their home games at the Estadio Romelio Martínez.

== History ==
Deportivo Unicosta was founded by businessman Enrique Chapman in 1995 and entered the Colombian second tier tournament Categoría Primera B that same year, earning promotion to Categoría Primera A by winning the 1996–97 Primera B tournament. There they topped the final group, placing ahead of Lanceros Boyacá, Deportivo Pasto, and Atlético Córdoba, and promotion was clinched with a draw in Tunja against Lanceros on 1 June 1997.

Their first tournament in the top tier was the 1997 Adecuación, in which they only won four matches and barely managed to avoid relegation with a 3–2 away victory over Millonarios on the final day of the regular season.

In the following season, Deportivo Unicosta placed last in the Torneo Apertura with 30 points in 36 matches and also last in the Torneo Finalización with 7 points in 14 matches, being relegated to Categoría Primera B. The club folded in 1999, and its participation rights in DIMAYOR were sold to Deportivo Soledad, which replaced Unicosta in Primera B.

== Stadium ==
Deportivo Unicosta played its home matches at Estadio Romelio Martínez in Barranquilla, which had formerly been used by Junior.

== Honours ==
=== Domestic ===
- Categoría Primera B
  - Winners (1): 1996–97
