= 1999 Categoría Primera A season =

The 1999 Categoria Primera A season, known as the 1999 Copa Mustang for sponsorship reasons, was the 52nd season of Colombia's top-tier football league. The season began on 7 February and ended on 19 December 1999.

Atlético Nacional were the champions, defeating América de Cali on penalties. Union Magdalena were relegated.

== Format ==
This season was played in a format different from the standard one. The Apertura was played as follows: it consists of 6 rounds in Cuadrangulares, 15 rounds in a single round robin, and one round (22) with regional derbies. The winners qualify for the Copa Libertadores, runners-up for Copa Conmebol.

The Finalizacion was played as: again 6 rounds of Cuadrangulares, 15 rounds in a single round robin, one more round of regional derbies, and then another set of Cuadrangulares according to the top eight teams of the table. The winners of each tournament qualify for the Copa Libertadores. However, since America de Cali finished first in the Apertura and then won the championship, the spot was passed down to the second-placed team of the Aggregate table, Junior.

== Apertura ==
The Apertura was played as follows: it consists of six rounds in Cuadrangulares, 15 rounds in a single round robin, and one round (22) with regional derbies. The teams that get the first place will qualify directly to the Finals at the end of the year.

=== Standings ===
Pos	Team	Pts	GP	W	D	L	GF	GA	GD
1.	América de Cali	40	22	11	7	4	42	27	+15
2.	Atlético Nacional	36	22	9	9	4	25	18	+7
3.	Once Caldas	34	22	9	7	6	35	19	+16
4.	Junior	34	22	9	7	6	34	34	0
5.	Tolima	32	22	7	11	4	25	20	+5
6.	Tulua	31	22	8	7	7	31	31	0
7.	Deportivo Cali	31	22	9	4	9	37	41	-4
8.	Independiente Medellín	30	22	6	12	4	26	20	+6
9.	Bucaramanga	27	22	5	12	5	30	24	+6
10.	Santa Fe	26	22	6	8	8	23	26	-3
11.	Millonarios	25	22	5	10	7	25	34	-9
12.	Deportivo Pasto	25	22	4	13	5	32	32	0
13.	Deportes Quindío	24	22	6	6	10	32	40	-8
14.	Envigado	22	22	6	4	12	21	32	-11
15.	Unión Magdalena	22	22	4	10	8	31	38	-7
16.	Atlético Huila	20	22	3	11	8	18	31	-13

Pts=Points; GP=Games Played; W=Wins; D=Draws; L=Losses; GF=Goals Favored; GA=Goals Allowed; GD=Goal Difference

Qualified for Cuadrangulares group stage.
Eliminated

=== Fixtures ===
Fixture 1 - February 7, 1999
Home	Score	Away
Quindío	2 - 0	Tulua
Envigado	0 - 2	Caldas
Millonarios	1 - 1	Santa Fe
Huila	1 - 1	Tolima
Magdalena	1 - 1	Junior
América	3 - 3	Cali
Pasto	1 - 1	Bucaramanga
Nacional	1 - 1	Medellín

Fixture 2 - February 14, 1999
Home	Score	Away
Cali	3 - 2	Tulua
Caldas	0 - 2	Nacional
Envigado	2 - 1	Medellín
Santa Fe	2 - 0	Huila
Tolima	1 - 1	Millonarios
Bucaramanga	1 - 1	Magdalena
Quindío	0 - 3	América
Junior	1 - 1	Pasto

Fixture 3 - February 21, 1999
Home	Score	Away
Cali	0 - 2	Quindío
Tulua	3 - 2	América
Nacional	1 - 1	Envigado
Caldas	1 - 1	Medellín
Bucaramanga	1 - 1	Junior
Magdalena	4 - 1	Pasto
Santa Fe	2 - 0	Tolima
Huila	1 - 1	Millonarios

Fixture 4 - February 28, 1999
Home	Score	Away
América	4 - 0	Tulua
Quindío	1 - 2	Cali
Envigado	0 - 1	Nacional
Medellín	1 - 0	Caldas
Junior	3 - 2	Bucaramanga
Pasto	6 - 1	Magdalena
Tolima	1 - 1	Santa Fe
Millonarios	1 - 0	Huila

Fixture 5 - March 7, 1999
Home	Score	Away
Caldas	2 - 1	Envigado
Cali	0 - 3	América
Tulua	2 - 0	Quindío
Santa Fe	2 - 0	Millonarios
Tolima	0 - 1	Huila
Junior	2 - 0	Magdalena
Bucaramanga	1 - 0	Pasto
Medellín	2 - 0	Nacional

Fixture 6 - March 14, 1999
Home	Score	Away
Nacional	1 - 0	Caldas
Pasto	4 - 2	Junior
Magdalena	1 - 2	Bucaramanga
América	3 - 0	Quindío
Tulua	3 - 2	Cali
Millonarios	2 - 2	Tolima
Huila	1 - 0	Santa Fe
Envigado	0 - 0	Medellín

Fixture 7 - March 21, 1999
Home	Score	Away
Nacional	1 - 1	Magdalena
Junior	2 - 1	Medellín
Caldas	3 - 1	Envigado
Millonarios	1 - 1	Santa Fe
América	2 - 2	Tulua
Bucaramanga	0 - 0	Tolima
Quindío	4 - 2	Cali
Huila	2 - 2	Pasto

Fixture 8 - March 28, 1999
Home	Score	Away
Medellín	0 - 0	Millonarios
Santa Fe	2 - 0	Nacional
Magdalena	0 - 2	Bucaramanga
Pasto	3 - 3	Junior
Envigado	0 - 0	América
Cali	2 - 1	Caldas
Tolima	1 - 1	Quindío
Tulua	1 - 1	Huila

Fixture 9 - April 4, 1999
Home	Score	Away
Nacional	0 - 1	Cali
América	1 - 0	Medellín
Bucaramanga	6 - 0	Envigado
Santa Fe	0 - 0	Tolima
Caldas	0 - 0	Pasto
Quindío	1 - 2	Tulua
Huila	0 - 1	Junior
Magdalena	4 - 0	Millonarios

Fixture - April 11, 1999
Home	Score	Away
Medellín	1 - 0	Caldas
Envigado	0 - 1	Nacional
Cali	2 - 0	Santa Fe
Junior	2 - 1	América
Millonarios	2 - 0	Huila
Tulua	0 - 1	Bucaramanga
Tolima	2 - 0	Magdalena
Pasto	2 - 2	Quindío

Fixture 11 - April 18, 1999
Home	Score	Away
Nacional	3 - 2	Tulua
Quindío	2 - 2	Medellín
Santa Fe	0 - 1	Envigado
Tolima	2 - 0	Millonarios
Caldas	4 - 0	Junior
América	0 - 0	Huila
Magdalena	2 - 2	Cali
Bucaramanga	0 - 0	Pasto

Fixture 12 - April 25, 1999
Home	Score	Away
Medellín	2 - 2	Bucaramanga
Envigado	2 - 2	Magdalena
Pasto	0 - 0	Nacional
Millonarios	1 - 2	América
Junior	3 - 0	Quindío
Cali	2 - 1	Tolima
Tulua	3 - 1	Santa Fe
Huila	2 - 2	Caldas

Fixture 13 - April 28, 1999
Home	Score	Away
Nacional	1 - 0	Medellín
Tolima	1 - 0	Envigado
Caldas	6 - 0	América
Bucaramanga	1 - 1	Junior
Santa Fe	2 - 2	Pasto
Quindío	3 - 1	Huila
Magdalena	0 - 0	Tulua
Cali	2 - 0	Millonarios

Fixture 14 - May 2, 1999
Home	Score	Away
Medellín	4 - 2	Santa Fe
Envigado	3 - 1	Cali
Junior	0 - 1	Nacional
Millonarios	3 - 2	Caldas
Huila	1 - 1	Bucaramanga
América	4 - 1	Quindío
Pasto	1 - 0	Magdalena
Tulua	0 - 1	Tolima

Fixture 15 - May 9, 1999
Home	Score	Away
Nacional	5 - 1	Huila
Envigado	3 - 1	Millonarios
Magdalena	1 - 1	Medellín
Santa Fe	2 - 2	Junior
Bucaramanga	1 - 2	América
Cali	1 - 1	Tulua
Tolima	2 - 2	Pasto
Quindío	1 - 1	Caldas

Fixture 16 - May 16, 1999
Home	Score	Away
América	0 - 0	Nacional
Millonarios	2 - 4	Quindío
Junior	3 - 2	Magdalena
Medellín	1 - 1	Tolima
Tulua	1 - 0	Envigado
Pasto	3 - 1	Cali
Caldas	0 - 0	Bucaramanga
Huila	0 - 0	Santa Fe

Fixture 17 - May 23, 1999
Home	Score	Away
Nacional	0 - 0	Caldas
Tolima	3 - 1	Junior
Bucaramanga	3 - 1	Quindío
Magdalena	3 - 3	Huila
Tulua	2 - 2	Millonarios
Santa Fe	1 - 2	América
Envigado	2 - 1	Pasto
Cali	1 - 1	Medellín

Fixture 18 - May 30, 1999
Home	Score	Away
América	2 - 3	Magdalena
Medellín	2 - 1	Envigado
Junior	3 - 2	Cali
Millonarios	2 - 2	Bucaramanga
Pasto	0 - 2	Tulua
Quindío	2 - 2	Nacional
Huila	0 - 1	Tolima
Caldas	3 - 0	Santa Fe

Fixture 19 - June 6, 1999
Home	Score	Away
Nacional	2 - 0	Bucaramanga
Pasto	2 - 2	Millonarios
Tolima	1 - 1	América
Magdalena	0 - 2	Caldas
Santa Fe	2 - 2	Quindío
Tulua	1 - 1	Medellín
Cali	3 - 0	Huila
Envigado	2 - 0	Junior

Fixture 20 - June 9, 1999
Home	Score	Away
Medellín	3 - 0	Pasto
Millonarios	1 - 1	Medellín
Huila	2 - 1	Envigado
Caldas	2 - 0	Tolima
Quindío	0 - 1	Magdalena
Bucaramanga	0 - 1	Santa Fe
Junior	1 - 0	Tulua
América	4 - 1	Cali

Fixture 21 - June 13, 1999
Home	Score	Away
Medellín	0 - 0	Huila
Envigado	1 - 3	Quindío
Tolima	3 - 1	Nacional
Pasto	1 - 1	América
Cali	3 - 2	Bucaramanga
Millonarios	1 - 0	Junior
Tulua	3 - 3	Caldas
Magdalena	0 - 1	Santa Fe

Fixture 22 - June 20, 1999
Home	Score	Away
Santa Fe	0 - 1	Millonarios
Nacional	1 - 1	Medellín
Bucaramanga	0 - 0	Pasto
Quindío	0 - 1	Tulua
Caldas	1 - 0	Envigado
América	2 - 1	Cali
Huila	1 - 1	Tolima
Junior	2 - 2	Magdalena

== Finalizacion ==
The Finalizacion was played as follows: again 6 rounds of Cuadrangulares, 15 rounds in a single round robin, one more round of regional derbies, and then another set of Cuadrangulares with the top eight teams of the table; the winners of groups A and B play two matches to decide who would qualify for the Championship finals against the first-placed team of the Apertura.

=== Standings ===
Pos	Team	Pts	GP	W	D	L	GF	GA	GD
1.	Millonarios	42	22	10	12	0	31	14	+17
2.	Tulua	38	22	10	8	4	29	19	+10
3.	Independiente Medellín	35	22	10	5	7	32	29	+3
4.	Atlético Junior	35	22	10	5	7	27	24	+3
5.	Deportivo Cali	34	22	9	7	6	30	23	+7
6.	Atlético Nacional	34	22	9	7	6	31	25	+6
7.	Once Caldas	34	22	8	10	4	37	24	+13
8.	Deportivo Pasto	32	22	10	2	10	33	33	0
9.	Bucaramanga	31	22	9	4	9	25	25	0
10.	América de Cali	29	22	7	8	7	28	26	+2
11.	Tolima	27	22	8	3	11	26	27	-1
12.	Envigado	25	22	8	4	10	25	33	-8
13.	Santa Fe	23	22	5	8	9	25	30	-5
14.	Unión Magdalena	22	22	5	7	10	22	31	-9
15.	Deportes Quindío	18	22	4	6	12	28	45	-17
16.	Atlético Huila	16	22	4	4	14	22	43	-21

Pts=Points; GP=Games played; W=Wins; D=Draws; L=Losses; GF=Goals Favored; GA=Goals Allowed; GD=Goal Difference

Qualified for Cuadrangulares Group stage.
Eliminated

=== Fixtures ===
Fixture 1 - February 7, 1999
Home	Score	Away
América	3 - 0	Medellín
Junior	1 - 0	Bucaramanga
Santa Fe	2 - 2	Caldas
Envigado	0 - 0	Cali
Tolima	2 - 3	Quindío
Huila	0 - 2	Pasto
Tulua	1 - 1	Millonarios
Nacional	4 - 1	Magdalena

Fixture 2 - February 14, 1999
Home	Score	Away
Medellín	4 - 1	Huila
Millonarios	2 - 0	Nacional
Caldas	2 - 3	Envigado
Pasto	2 - 0	América
Cali	1 - 1	Santa Fe
Quindío	0 - 2	Junior
Magdalena	1 - 2	Tulua
Bucaramanga	1 - 2	Tolima

Fixture 3 - February 21, 1999
Home	Score	Away
Medellín	2 - 0	Pasto
Tulua	2 - 1	Nacional
Santa Fe	1 - 1	Envigado
Huila	1 - 1	América
Cali	0 - 0	Caldas
Tolima	0 - 0	Junior
Magdalena	1 - 1	Millonarios
Bucaramanga	2 - 2	Quindío

Fixture 4 - February 28, 1999
Home	Score	Away
Millonarios	2 - 0	Magdalena
América	1 - 1	Huila
Nacional	0 - 0	Tuluá
Envigado	2 - 1	Santa Fé
Junior	1 - 0	Tolima
Caldas	3 - 0	Cali
Quindío	1 - 1	Bucaramanga
Pasto	2 - 1	Medellín

Fixture 5 - March 7, 1999
Home	Score	Away
Medellín	1 - 0	América
Magdalena	1 - 2	Nacional
Cali	4 - 0	Envigado
Millonarios	1 - 1	Tulua
Pasto	3 - 2	Huila
Quindío	2 - 1	Tolima
Bucaramanga	2 - 0	Junior
Caldas	0 - 0	Santa Fe

Fixture 6 - March 14, 1999
Home	Score	Away
Junior	2 - 1	Quindío
América	2 - 0	Pasto
Huila	2 - 2	Medellín
Tulua	1 - 1	Magdalena
Tolima	1 - 0	Bucaramanga
Nacional	1 - 1	Millonarios
Santa Fe	3 - 2	Cali
Envigado	0 - 1	Once Caldas

Fixture 7 - March 21, 1999
Home	Score	Away
Santa Fe	0 - 0	Millonarios
Cali	1 - 1	Quindío
Tolima	0 - 1	Bucaramanga
Tulua	2 - 2	América
Magdalena	0 - 1	Nacional
Pasto	4 - 0	Huila
Envigado	1 - 1	Caldas
Medellín	3 - 1	Junior

Fixture 8 - March 28, 1999
Home	Score	Away
Millonarios	1 - 0	Medellín
Huila	0 - 1	Tulua
América	2 - 1	Envigado
Caldas	3 - 0	Cali
Quindío	1 - 3	Tolima
Bucaramanga	1 - 0	Magdalena
Nacional	1 - 1	Santa Fe
Junior	2 - 1	Pasto

Fixture 9 - April 4, 1999
Home	Score	Away
Cali	2 - 3	Nacional
Envigado	2 - 1	Bucaramanga
Millonarios	1 - 1	Magdalena
Tuluá	2 - 0	Quindío
Junior	2 - 2	Huila
Pasto	2 - 2	Once Caldas
Medellín	1 - 1	América
Tolima	2 - 1	Santa Fé

Fixture 10 - April 11, 1999
Home	Score	Away
Nacional	2 - 0	Envigado
Once Caldas	4 - 1	Medellín
América	2 - 0	Junior
Bucaramanga	0 - 0	Tuluá
Quindío	3 - 0	Pasto
Santa Fé	1 - 2	Cali
Magdalena	1 - 0	Tolima
Huila	0 - 1	Millonarios

Fixture 11 - April 18, 1999
Home	Score	Away
Millonarios	2 - 1	Tolima
Tulua	1 - 0	Nacional
Junior	2 - 0	Caldas
Huila	1 - 0	América
Pasto	1 - 0	Bucaramanga
Medellín	2 - 1	Quindío
Cali	0 - 0	Magdalena
Envigado	2 - 1	Santa Fe

Fixture 12 - April 25, 1999
Home	Score	Away
Nacional	2 - 1	Pasto
Santa Fé	1 - 1	Tuluá
Quindío	2 - 3	Junior
América	1 - 1	Millonarios
Magdalena	1 - 0	Envigado
Tolima	1 - 0	Cali
Bucaramanga	2 - 1	Medellín
Once Caldas	3 - 1	Huila

Fixture 13 - April 28, 1999
Home	Score	Away
Junior	2 - 2	Bucaramanga
Millonarios	1 - 1	Cali
Tuluá	2 - 1	Magdalena
América	2 - 1	Once Caldas
Pasto	0 - 1	Santa Fe
Medellín	0 - 0	Nacional
Envigado	2 - 1	Tolima
Huila	2 - 0	Quindío

Fixture 14 - May 2, 1999
Home	Score	Away
Bucaramanga	2 - 1	Huila
Nacional	3 - 1	Junior
Magdalena	3 - 2	Pasto
Cali	3 - 2	Envigado
Quindío	1 - 1	América
Once Caldas	1 - 1	Millonarios
Santa Fe	0 - 2	Medellín
Tolima	0 - 2	Tulua

Fixture 15 - May 9, 1999
Home	Score	Away
Caldas	3 - 3	Quindío
Huila	1 - 0	Nacional
Medellín	3 - 0	Magdalena
Tulua	1 - 1	Cali
Junior	1 - 0	Santa Fe
América	3 - 1	Bucaramanga
Millonarios	3 - 2	Envigado
Pasto	1 - 0	Tolima

Fixture 16 - May 16, 1999
Home	Score	Away
Quindío	2 - 2	Millonarios
Nacional	1 - 0	América
Cali	2 - 0	Pasto
Envigado FC	1 - 0	Tulua
Tolima	0 - 3	Medellín
Magdalena	2 - 2	Junior
Santa Fe	2 - 1	Huila
Bucaramanga	2 - 1	Caldas

Fixture 17 - May 23, 1999
Home	Score	Away
América	3 - 1	Santa Fé
Once Caldas	4 - 1	Nacional
Junior	2 - 0	Tolima
Millonarios	3 - 0	Tuluá
Medellín	0 - 2	Cali
Pasto	3 - 2	Envigado
Quindío	1 - 0	Bucaramanga
Huila	2 - 1	Magdalena

Fixture 18 - May 30, 1999
Home	Score	Away
Nacional	5 - 1	Quindío
Tuluá	5 - 0	Pasto
Cali	1 - 0	Junior
Tolima	2 - 1	Huila
Bucaramanga	0 - 2	Millonarios
Envigado	0 - 0	Medellín
Santa Fé	1 - 1	Once Caldas
Magdalena	1 - 1	América

Fixture 19 - June 6, 1999
Home	Score	Away
Millonarios	1 - 0	Pasto
Junior	2 - 0	Envigado
Medellín	2 - 1	Tuluá
Bucaramanga	3 - 1	Nacional
América	0 - 2	Tolima
Once Caldas	1 - 1	Magdalena
Quindío	1 - 3	Santa Fé
Huila	0 - 2	Cali

Fixture 20 - June 9, 1999
Home	Score	Away
Nacional	0 - 0	Millonarios
Cali	3 - 1	América
Pasto	6 - 1	Medellín
Envigado	2 - 1	Huila
Tolima	0 - 0	Once Caldas
Santa Fé	1 - 2	Bucaramanga
Magdalena	4 - 0	Quindío
Tuluá	1 - 0	Junior

Fixture 21 - June 13, 1999
Home	Score	Away
Huila	1 - 2	Medellín
Quindío	1 - 2	Envigado
Nacional	2 - 2	Tolima
América	2 - 2	Pasto
Bucaramanga	2 - 1	Cali
Junior	1 - 1	Millonarios
Caldas	2 - 1	Tulua
Santa Fe	3 - 0	Magdalena

Fixture 22 - June 20, 1999
Home	Score	Away
Millonarios	3 - 0	Santa Fé
Cali	2 - 0	América
Pasto	1 - 0	Bucaramanga
Envigado	0 - 2	Once Caldas
Tolima	6 - 1	Huila
Magdalena	1 - 0	Junior
Medellín	1 - 1	Nacional
Tuluá	2 - 1	Quindío

== Annual Standings ==
Pos	Team	Pts	GP	W	D	L	GF	GA	GD
1.	Atlético Nacional	85	50	23	16	11	70	53	+17
2.	Atlético Junior	79	50	24	13	15	72	68	+4
3.	Tulua	77	50	20	17	14	70	60	+10
4.	Independiente Medellín	76	50	19	19	13	68	58	+10
5.	Deportivo Cali	75	50	21	12	17	79	72	+7
6.	Once Caldas	73	50	17	22	11	77	50	+17
7.	Millonarios	72	50	16	24	10	63	58	+5
8.	América de Cali	69	44	18	15	11	70	53	+18
9.	Deportes Tolima	59	44	15	14	15	51	47	+4
10.	Bucaramanga	58	44	14	16	14	55	49	+6
11.	Deportivo Pasto	58	50	14	16	20	72	76	-4
12.	Envigado	50	44	14	8	22	46	65	-19
13.	Independiente Santa Fe	49	44	11	16	17	48	56	-8
14.	Unión Magdalena	44	44	9	17	18	53	69	-16
15.	Deportes Quindío	42	44	10	12	22	60	85	-15
16.	Atlético Huila	36	44	7	15	22	40	74	-34

Pts=Points; GP=Games played; W=Wins; D=Draws; L=Losses; GF=Goals Favored; GA=Goals Allowed; GD=Difference

Qualified for 2000 Copa Libertadores
Qualified for semifinal group stage.
Relegated

=== Relegated and Promoted Team(s) ===
Categories	Relegated team(s)	Promoted team(s)
FPC; Primera B	Unión Magdalena	Real Cartagena

== Championship final qualifications ==
This group stage decided the team that qualified to the Championship final against the team who won the Apertura tournament. It was played by eight teams in two different groups. The first teams from each group go to a final to decide the team who advanced to the Championship final.

=== Group A ===
Seed	Pos.	Team	Pts	GP	W	D	L	GF	GA	GD
(1)	1.	Independiente Medellín	11	6	3	2	1	10	9	+1
(5)	2.	Deportivo Cali	10	6	3	1	2	12	8	+4
(7)	3.	Once Caldas	5	6	0	5	1	5	7	-2
(3)	4.	Millonarios	5	6	1	2	3	7	10	-3

Fixture 1 - November 17, 1999
Home	Score	Away
Medellín	1 - 3	Deportivo Cali
Once Caldas	1 - 1	Millonarios

Fixture 2 - November 21, 1999
Home	Score	Away
Millonarios	2 - 3	Medellín
Deportivo Cali	0 - 0	Once Caldas

Fixture 3 - November 24, 1999
Home	Score	Away
Once Caldas	1 - 1	Medellín
Deportivo Cali	3 - 1	Millonarios

Fixture 4 - November 28, 1999
Home	Score	Away
Medellín	1 - 1	Once Caldas
Millonarios	2 - 1	Deportivo Cali

Fixture 5 - December 1, 1999
Home	Score	Away
Millonarios	0 - 0	Once Caldas
Deportivo Cali	1 - 2	Medellín

Fixture 6 - December 5, 1999
Home	Score	Away
Once Caldas	2 - 4	Deportivo Cali
Medellín	2 - 1	Millonarios

=== Group B ===
Seed	Pos.	Team	Pts	GP	W	D	L	GF	GA	GD
(6)	1.	Atlético Nacional	15	6	5	0	1	14	10	+4
(2)	2.	Junior	10	6	3	1	2	11	10	+1
(8)	3.	Tulua	8	6	2	2	2	10	10	0
(4)	4.	Deportivo Pasto	1	6	0	1	5	7	12	-5

Fixture 1 - November 17, 1999
Home	Score	Away
Tulua	2 - 1	Pasto
Junior	1 - 2	Atlético Nacional

Fixture 2 - November 21, 1999
Home	Score	Away
Atlético Nacional	3 - 2	Tulua
Pasto	2 - 3	Junior

Fixture 3 - November 24, 1999
Home	Score	Away
Atlético Nacional	3 - 2	Pasto
Tulua	1 - 1	Junior

Fixture 4 - November 28, 1999
Home	Score	Away
Junior	1 - 2	Tulua
Pasto	0 - 1	Atlético Nacional

Fixture 5 - December 1, 1999
Home	Score	Away
Atlético Nacional	2 - 1	Junior
Pasto	0 - 0	Tulua

Fixture 6 - December 5, 1999
Home	Score	Away
Tulua	4 - 3	Atlético Nacional
Junior	3 - 2	Pasto

== Finalizacion Finals ==
Date	City	Home	Score	Away
December 8, 1999	Medellín	Independiente Medellín	0 - 0	Atlético Nacional
December 12, 1999	Medellín	Atlético Nacional	1 - 0	Independiente Medellín
Atlético Nacional qualifies to the Championship finals, 1 - 0 on aggregate.

=== 1999 Copa Mustang Final ===
Date	City	Home	Score	Away
December 16, 1999	Cali	América de Cali	1 - 1	Atlético Nacional
December 19, 1999	Medellín	Atlético Nacional	0 - 0	América de Cali
Atlético Nacional is the champion of 1999 Copa Mustang by winning 4 - 2 on Penalty kicks
