= 2006 FIFA World Cup Group G =

Football tournament group stage

Group G of the 2006 FIFA World Cup began on 13 June and completed on 23 June 2006. Switzerland won the group and advanced to the round of 16, along with France, who went on to reach the final. The previous World Cup's fourth-place team South Korea and Togo failed to advance. Switzerland were the only team not to concede a goal during the group stage of the tournament and would become the first team to be knocked out of a World Cup without conceding, losing on penalties after a 0–0 draw with Ukraine in the round of 16.

== Standings ==
Pos	Team	Pld	W	D	L	GF	GA	GD	Pts	Qualification
1	Switzerland	3	2	1	0	4	0	+4	7	Advance to knockout stage
2	France	3	1	2	0	3	1	+2	5	Advance to knockout stage
3	South Korea	3	1	1	1	3	4	−1	4	
4	Togo	3	0	0	3	1	6	−5	0	

Source: FIFA
Rules for classification: Tie-breaking criteria
- Switzerland advanced to play Ukraine (runners-up of Group H) in the round of 16.
- France advanced to play Spain (winners of Group H) in the round of 16.

== Matches ==
All times local (CEST/UTC+2)

=== South Korea vs Togo ===
During the national anthems, the national anthem of South Korea was initially mistakenly played when Togo’s national anthem was supposed to.

13 June 2006
15:00

South Korea	2–1	Togo
Lee Chun-soo 54'; Ahn Jung-hwan 72'		Kader 31'

Waldstadion, Frankfurt
Attendance: 48,000
Referee: Graham Poll (England)

South Korea	Togo

GK	1	Lee Woon-jae (c)
CB	4	Choi Jin-cheul
CB	2	Kim Young-chul	(yellow card) 41'
CB	6	Kim Jin-kyu		(substituted off) 46'
RM	22	Song Chong-gug
CM	17	Lee Ho
CM	13	Lee Eul-yong		(substituted off) 68'
LM	12	Lee Young-pyo
RF	7	Park Ji-sung
CF	19	Cho Jae-jin		(substituted off) 83'
LF	14	Lee Chun-soo	(yellow card) 51'
Substitutions:
FW	9	Ahn Jung-hwan		(substituted on) 46'
MF	5	Kim Nam-il		(substituted on) 68'
DF	18	Kim Sang-sik		(substituted on) 83'
Manager:
(Netherlands) Dick Advocaat

GK	16	Kossi Agassa
RB	5	Massamasso Tchangai	(yellow card) 90+2'
CB	3	Jean-Paul Abalo (c)	(yellow card) 23' (yellow-red card) 53'
CB	2	Daré Nibombé
LB	19	Ludovic Assemoassa		(substituted off) 62'
RM	18	Junior Sènaya		(substituted off) 55'
CM	15	Alaixys Romao	(yellow card) 24'
CM	10	Chérif Touré Mamam
LM	7	Moustapha Salifou		(substituted off) 86'
CF	17	Mohamed Kader
CF	4	Emmanuel Adebayor
Substitutions:
DF	23	Assimiou Touré		(substituted on) 55'
FW	13	Richmond Forson		(substituted on) 62'
MF	6	Yao Aziawonou		(substituted on) 86'
Manager:
(Germany) Otto Pfister

Man of the Match:
Ahn Jung-hwan (South Korea)

Assistant referees:
Philip Sharp (England)
Glen Turner (England)
Fourth official:
Jerome Damon (South Africa)
Fifth official:
Justice Yeboah (Ghana)

=== France vs Switzerland ===
After a streak of 22 matches without one, Switzerland achieved their first clean sheet in a World Cup match. They went on to become the first team in history to be eliminated from a FIFA World Cup without conceding a goal.

13 June 2006
18:00

France	0–0	Switzerland

Gottlieb-Daimler-Stadion, Stuttgart
Attendance: 52,000
Referee: Valentin Ivanov (Russia)

France	Switzerland

GK	16	Fabien Barthez
RB	19	Willy Sagnol	(yellow card) 90+3'
CB	15	Lilian Thuram
CB	5	William Gallas
LB	3	Eric Abidal	(yellow card) 64'
CM	4	Patrick Vieira
CM	6	Claude Makélélé
RW	11	Sylvain Wiltord		(substituted off) 84'
AM	10	Zinedine Zidane (c)	(yellow card) 72'
LW	22	Franck Ribéry		(substituted off) 70'
CF	12	Thierry Henry
Substitutions:
FW	14	Louis Saha		(substituted on) 70'
MF	8	Vikash Dhorasoo		(substituted on) 84'
Manager:
Raymond Domenech

GK	1	Pascal Zuberbühler
RB	23	Philipp Degen	(yellow card) 56'
CB	20	Patrick Müller		(substituted off) 75'
CB	4	Philippe Senderos
LB	3	Ludovic Magnin	(yellow card) 42'
RM	16	Tranquillo Barnetta
CM	7	Ricardo Cabanas	(yellow card) 72'
CM	6	Johann Vogel (c)
LM	8	Raphaël Wicky		(substituted off) 82'
CF	9	Alexander Frei	(yellow card) 90+3'
CF	11	Marco Streller	(yellow card) 45'	(substituted off) 57'
Substitutions:
FW	10	Daniel Gygax		(substituted on) 57'
DF	2	Johan Djourou		(substituted on) 75'
MF	5	Xavier Margairaz		(substituted on) 82'
Manager:
Köbi Kuhn

Man of the Match:
Claude Makélélé (France)

Assistant referees:
Nikolay Golubev (Russia)
Evgeni Volnin (Russia)
Fourth official:
Kevin Stott (United States)
Fifth official:
Gregory Barkey (United States)

=== France vs South Korea ===
18 June 2006
21:00

France	1–1	South Korea
Henry 9'		Park Ji-sung 81'

Zentralstadion, Leipzig
Attendance: 43,000
Referee: Benito Archundia (Mexico)

France	South Korea

GK	16	Fabien Barthez
RB	19	Willy Sagnol
CB	15	Lilian Thuram
CB	5	William Gallas
LB	3	Eric Abidal	(yellow card) 79'
CM	4	Patrick Vieira
CM	6	Claude Makélélé
RW	11	Sylvain Wiltord		(substituted off) 60'
AM	10	Zinedine Zidane (c)	(yellow card) 85'	(substituted off) 90+1'
LW	7	Florent Malouda		(substituted off) 88'
CF	12	Thierry Henry
Substitutions:
MF	22	Franck Ribéry		(substituted on) 60'
MF	8	Vikash Dhorasoo		(substituted on) 88'
FW	20	David Trezeguet		(substituted on) 90+1'
Manager:
Raymond Domenech

GK	1	Lee Woon-jae (c)
RB	12	Lee Young-pyo
CB	4	Choi Jin-cheul
CB	2	Kim Young-chul
LB	3	Kim Dong-jin	(yellow card) 29'
RM	17	Lee Ho	(yellow card) 11'	(substituted off) 69'
CM	5	Kim Nam-il
LM	13	Lee Eul-yong		(substituted off) 46'
RF	14	Lee Chun-soo		(substituted off) 72'
CF	19	Cho Jae-jin
LF	7	Park Ji-sung
Substitutions:
FW	11	Seol Ki-hyeon		(substituted on) 46'
DF	18	Kim Sang-sik		(substituted on) 69'
FW	9	Ahn Jung-hwan		(substituted on) 72'
Manager:
(Netherlands) Dick Advocaat

Man of the Match:
Park Ji-sung (South Korea)

Assistant referees:
José Ramírez (Mexico)
Héctor Vergara (Canada)
Fourth official:
Essam Abd El Fatah (Egypt)
Fifth official:
Mamadou N'Doye (Senegal)

=== Togo vs Switzerland ===
19 June 2006
15:00

Togo	0–2	Switzerland
		Frei 16'; Barnetta 88'

Westfalenstadion, Dortmund
Attendance: 65,000
Referee: Carlos Amarilla (Paraguay)

Togo	Switzerland

GK	16	Kossi Agassa
RB	23	Assimiou Touré
CB	5	Massamasso Tchangai (c)
CB	2	Daré Nibombé
LB	13	Richmond Forson
RM	9	Thomas Dossevi		(substituted off) 69'
CM	15	Alaixys Romao	(yellow card) 53'
CM	8	Kuami Agboh		(substituted off) 25'
LM	10	Chérif Touré Mamam		(substituted off) 87'
CF	17	Mohamed Kader
CF	4	Emmanuel Adebayor	(yellow card) 47'
Substitutions:
FW	7	Moustapha Salifou	(yellow card) 45'	(substituted on) 25'
FW	18	Junior Sènaya		(substituted on) 69'
FW	11	Robert Malm		(substituted on) 87'
Manager:
(Germany) Otto Pfister

GK	1	Pascal Zuberbühler
RB	23	Philipp Degen
CB	20	Patrick Müller
CB	4	Philippe Senderos
LB	3	Ludovic Magnin
RM	16	Tranquillo Barnetta
CM	6	Johann Vogel (c)	(yellow card) 90+2'
CM	7	Ricardo Cabanas		(substituted off) 77'
LM	8	Raphaël Wicky
CF	9	Alexander Frei		(substituted off) 87'
CF	10	Daniel Gygax		(substituted off) 46'
Substitutions:
MF	22	Hakan Yakin		(substituted on) 46'
FW	11	Marco Streller		(substituted on) 77'
FW	18	Mauro Lustrinelli		(substituted on) 87'
Manager:
Köbi Kuhn

Man of the Match:
Alexander Frei (Switzerland)

Assistant referees:
Amelio Andino (Paraguay)
Manuel Bernal (Paraguay)
Fourth official:
Mohamed Guezzaz (Morocco)
Fifth official:
Brahim Djezzar (Algeria)

=== Togo vs France ===
23 June 2006
21:00

Togo	0–2	France
		Vieira 55'; Henry 61'

RheinEnergieStadion, Cologne
Attendance: 45,000
Referee: Jorge Larrionda (Uruguay)

Togo	France

GK	16	Kossi Agassa
RB	5	Massamasso Tchangai
CB	3	Jean-Paul Abalo (c)
CB	2	Daré Nibombé
LB	13	Richmond Forson
RM	18	Junior Sènaya
CM	6	Yao Aziawonou	(yellow card) 38'
CM	7	Moustapha Salifou	(yellow card) 88'
LM	10	Chérif Touré Mamam	(yellow card) 44'	(substituted off) 59'
CF	17	Mohamed Kader
CF	4	Emmanuel Adebayor		(substituted off) 75'
Substitutions:
FW	14	Adékambi Olufadé		(substituted on) 59'
MF	9	Thomas Dossevi		(substituted on) 75'
Manager:
(Germany) Otto Pfister

GK	16	Fabien Barthez
RB	19	Willy Sagnol
CB	15	Lilian Thuram
CB	5	William Gallas
LB	13	Mikaël Silvestre
RM	22	Franck Ribéry		(substituted off) 77'
CM	4	Patrick Vieira (c)		(substituted off) 81'
CM	6	Claude Makélélé	(yellow card) 30'
LM	7	Florent Malouda		(substituted off) 74'
CF	20	David Trezeguet
CF	12	Thierry Henry
Substitutions:
FW	11	Sylvain Wiltord		(substituted on) 74'
FW	9	Sidney Govou		(substituted on) 77'
MF	18	Alou Diarra		(substituted on) 81'
Manager:
Raymond Domenech

Man of the Match:
Patrick Vieira (France)

Assistant referees:
Wálter Rial (Uruguay)
Pablo Fandino (Uruguay)
Fourth official:
Carlos Chandía (Chile)
Fifth official:
Rodrigo González (Chile)

=== Switzerland vs South Korea ===
23 June 2006
21:00

Switzerland	2–0	South Korea
Senderos 23'; Frei 77'

Niedersachsenstadion, Hanover
Attendance: 43,000
Referee: Horacio Elizondo (Argentina)

Switzerland	South Korea

GK	1	Pascal Zuberbühler
RB	23	Philipp Degen
CB	20	Patrick Müller
CB	4	Philippe Senderos	(yellow card) 43'	(substituted off) 53'
LB	17	Christoph Spycher	(yellow card) 82'
DM	6	Johann Vogel (c)
RM	16	Tranquillo Barnetta
CM	22	Hakan Yakin	(yellow card) 55'	(substituted off) 71'
CM	7	Ricardo Cabanas
LM	8	Raphaël Wicky	(yellow card) 69'	(substituted off) 88'
CF	9	Alexander Frei
Substitutions:
DF	2	Johan Djourou	(yellow card) 90'	(substituted on) 53'
MF	5	Xavier Margairaz		(substituted on) 71'
MF	19	Valon Behrami		(substituted on) 88'
Manager:
Köbi Kuhn

GK	1	Lee Woon-jae (c)
RB	12	Lee Young-pyo		(substituted off) 63'
CB	4	Choi Jin-cheul	(yellow card) 78'
CB	6	Kim Jin-kyu	(yellow card) 37'
LB	3	Kim Dong-jin
CM	5	Kim Nam-il
CM	17	Lee Ho
RW	7	Park Ji-sung
AM	14	Lee Chun-soo	(yellow card) 80'
LW	10	Park Chu-young	(yellow card) 23'	(substituted off) 66'
CF	19	Cho Jae-jin
Substitutions:
FW	9	Ahn Jung-hwan	(yellow card) 78'	(substituted on) 63'
FW	11	Seol Ki-hyeon		(substituted on) 66'
Manager:
(Netherlands) Dick Advocaat

Man of the Match:
Alexander Frei (Switzerland)

Assistant referees:
Darío García (Argentina)
Rodolfo Otero (Argentina)
Fourth official:
Essam Abd El Fatah (Egypt)
Fifth official:
Dramane Danté (Mali)

== See also ==
- France at the FIFA World Cup
- South Korea at the FIFA World Cup
- Switzerland at the FIFA World Cup
- Togo at the FIFA World Cup
