= 2006 FIFA World Cup squads =

This article lists the confirmed national football squads for the 2006 FIFA World Cup tournament held in Germany, between 9 June and 9 July 2006. Before announcing their final squad, several teams named a provisional squad of 23 to 33 players, but each country's final squad of 23 players had to be submitted by 15 May 2006. Replacement of injured players was permitted until 24 hours before the team's first World Cup game. Players marked (c) were named as captain for their national squad. Number of caps counts until the start of the World Cup, including all pre-tournament friendlies. Club information is that used by FIFA. Players for whom this information changed during or prior to the tournament are indicated by footnotes.

== Group A ==
=== Costa Rica ===
Head coach: Alexandre Guimarães

No.	Pos.	Player	Date of birth (age)	Caps	Club
1	GK	Álvaro Mesén	24 December 1972 (aged 33)	38	(Costa Rica) Herediano
2	DF	Jervis Drummond	8 September 1976 (aged 29)	56	(Costa Rica) Saprissa
3	DF	Luis Marín (c)	10 August 1974 (aged 31)	120	(Costa Rica) Alajuelense
4	DF	Michael Umaña	16 July 1982 (aged 23)	18	(Costa Rica) Brujas
5	DF	Gilberto Martínez	1 October 1979 (aged 26)	57	(Italy) Brescia
6	MF	Danny Fonseca	7 November 1979 (aged 26)	22	(Costa Rica) Cartaginés
7	MF	Christian Bolaños	17 May 1984 (aged 22)	16	(Costa Rica) Saprissa
8	DF	Mauricio Solís	13 December 1972 (aged 33)	107	(Guatemala) Comunicaciones
9	FW	Paulo Wanchope	31 July 1976 (aged 29)	69	(Costa Rica) Herediano
10	MF	Walter Centeno	6 October 1974 (aged 31)	93	(Costa Rica) Saprissa
11	FW	Rónald Gómez	24 January 1975 (aged 31)	80	(Costa Rica) Saprissa
12	DF	Leonardo González	21 November 1980 (aged 25)	36	(Costa Rica) Herediano
13	FW	Kurt Bernard	8 December 1977 (aged 28)	3	(Costa Rica) Puntarenas
14	MF	Randall Azofeifa	30 December 1984 (aged 21)	5	(Costa Rica) Saprissa
15	DF	Harold Wallace	7 September 1975 (aged 30)	78	(Costa Rica) Alajuelense
16	MF	Carlos Hernández	9 April 1982 (aged 24)	17	(Costa Rica) Alajuelense
17	DF	Gabriel Badilla	30 June 1984 (aged 21)	7	(Costa Rica) Saprissa
18	GK	José Francisco Porras	8 November 1970 (aged 35)	16	(Costa Rica) Saprissa
19	FW	Álvaro Saborío	25 March 1982 (aged 24)	23	(Costa Rica) Saprissa
20	MF	Douglas Sequeira	23 August 1977 (aged 28)	29	(United States) Real Salt Lake
21	FW	Víctor Núñez	15 April 1980 (aged 26)	3	(Costa Rica) Cartaginés
22	DF	Michael Rodríguez	30 December 1981 (aged 24)	3	(Costa Rica) Alajuelense
23	GK	Wardy Alfaro	31 December 1977 (aged 28)	2	(Costa Rica) Alajuelense

=== Ecuador ===
Head coach: (Colombia) Luis Fernando Suárez

No.	Pos.	Player	Date of birth (age)	Caps	Club
1	GK	Edwin Villafuerte	12 March 1979 (aged 27)	15	(Ecuador) Deportivo Quito
2	DF	Jorge Guagua	28 September 1981 (aged 24)	18	(Ecuador) El Nacional
3	DF	Iván Hurtado (c)	16 August 1974 (aged 31)	130	(Qatar) Al-Arabi
4	DF	Ulises de la Cruz	8 February 1974 (aged 32)	84	(England) Aston Villa
5	DF	José Luis Perlaza	6 October 1981 (aged 24)	3	(Ecuador) Olmedo
6	MF	Patricio Urrutia	15 October 1978 (aged 27)	6	(Ecuador) LDU Quito
7	MF	Christian Lara	27 April 1980 (aged 26)	19	(Ecuador) El Nacional
8	FW	Edison Méndez	16 March 1979 (aged 27)	64	(Ecuador) LDU Quito
9	FW	Félix Borja	2 April 1983 (aged 23)	6	(Ecuador) El Nacional
10	FW	Iván Kaviedes	24 October 1977 (aged 28)	44	(Argentina) Argentinos Juniors
11	FW	Agustín Delgado	23 December 1974 (aged 31)	68	(Ecuador) LDU Quito
12	GK	Cristian Mora	26 August 1979 (aged 26)	8	(Ecuador) LDU Quito
13	DF	Paúl Ambrosi	14 October 1980 (aged 25)	24	(Ecuador) LDU Quito
14	MF	Segundo Castillo	15 May 1982 (aged 24)	11	(Ecuador) El Nacional
15	MF	Marlon Ayoví	27 September 1971 (aged 34)	74	(Ecuador) Deportivo Quito
16	MF	Antonio Valencia	4 August 1985 (aged 20)	17	(Spain) Recreativo
17	DF	Giovanny Espinoza	12 April 1977 (aged 29)	56	(Ecuador) LDU Quito
18	DF	Néicer Reasco	23 July 1977 (aged 28)	31	(Ecuador) LDU Quito
19	MF	Luis Saritama	20 October 1983 (aged 22)	15	(Ecuador) Deportivo Quito
20	MF	Edwin Tenorio	16 June 1976 (aged 29)	68	(Ecuador) Barcelona SC
21	FW	Carlos Tenorio	14 May 1979 (aged 27)	29	(Qatar) Al Sadd
22	GK	Damián Lanza	10 April 1982 (aged 24)	5	(Ecuador) Aucas
23	FW	Christian Benítez	1 May 1986 (aged 20)	5	(Ecuador) El Nacional

=== Germany ===
Head coach: Jürgen Klinsmann

No.	Pos.	Player	Date of birth (age)	Caps	Club
1	GK	Jens Lehmann	10 November 1969 (aged 36)	32	(England) Arsenal
2	DF	Marcell Jansen	4 November 1985 (aged 20)	7	(Germany) Borussia Mönchengladbach
3	DF	Arne Friedrich	29 May 1979 (aged 27)	36	(Germany) Hertha BSC
4	DF	Robert Huth	18 August 1984 (aged 21)	16	(England) Chelsea
5	MF	Sebastian Kehl	13 February 1980 (aged 26)	27	(Germany) Borussia Dortmund
6	DF	Jens Nowotny	11 January 1974 (aged 32)	46	(Germany) Bayer Leverkusen
7	MF	Bastian Schweinsteiger	1 August 1984 (aged 21)	28	(Germany) Bayern Munich
8	MF	Torsten Frings	22 November 1976 (aged 29)	52	(Germany) Werder Bremen
9	FW	Mike Hanke	5 November 1983 (aged 22)	6	(Germany) VfL Wolfsburg
10	FW	Oliver Neuville	1 May 1973 (aged 33)	55	(Germany) Borussia Mönchengladbach
11	FW	Miroslav Klose	9 June 1978 (aged 28)	55	(Germany) Werder Bremen
12	GK	Oliver Kahn	15 June 1969 (aged 36)	85	(Germany) Bayern Munich
13	MF	Michael Ballack (c)	26 September 1976 (aged 29)	65	(Germany) Bayern Munich
14	FW	Gerald Asamoah	3 October 1978 (aged 27)	40	(Germany) Schalke 04
15	MF	Thomas Hitzlsperger	5 April 1982 (aged 24)	15	(Germany) VfB Stuttgart
16	DF	Philipp Lahm	11 November 1983 (aged 22)	18	(Germany) Bayern Munich
17	DF	Per Mertesacker	29 September 1984 (aged 21)	23	(Germany) Hannover 96
18	MF	Tim Borowski	2 May 1980 (aged 26)	20	(Germany) Werder Bremen
19	MF	Bernd Schneider	17 November 1973 (aged 32)	64	(Germany) Bayer Leverkusen
20	FW	Lukas Podolski	4 June 1985 (aged 21)	25	(Germany) 1. FC Köln
21	DF	Christoph Metzelder	5 November 1980 (aged 25)	22	(Germany) Borussia Dortmund
22	MF	David Odonkor	21 February 1984 (aged 22)	1	(Germany) Borussia Dortmund
23	GK	Timo Hildebrand	5 April 1979 (aged 27)	3	(Germany) VfB Stuttgart

=== Poland ===
Head coach: Paweł Janas

No.	Pos.	Player	Date of birth (age)	Caps	Club
1	GK	Artur Boruc	20 February 1980 (aged 26)	17	(Scotland) Celtic
2	DF	Mariusz Jop	3 August 1978 (aged 27)	12	(Russia) FC Moscow
3	DF	Seweryn Gancarczyk	22 November 1981 (aged 24)	2	(Ukraine) Metalist Kharkiv
4	DF	Marcin Baszczyński	7 June 1977 (aged 29)	32	(Poland) Wisła Kraków
5	MF	Kamil Kosowski	30 August 1977 (aged 28)	45	(Germany) 1. FC Kaiserslautern
6	DF	Jacek Bąk (c)	24 March 1973 (aged 33)	72	(Qatar) Al-Rayyan
7	MF	Radosław Sobolewski	13 December 1976 (aged 29)	19	(Poland) Wisła Kraków
8	MF	Jacek Krzynówek	15 May 1976 (aged 30)	58	(Germany) Bayer Leverkusen
9	FW	Maciej Żurawski	12 September 1976 (aged 29)	50	(Scotland) Celtic
10	MF	Mirosław Szymkowiak	12 November 1976 (aged 29)	29	(Turkey) Trabzonspor
11	FW	Grzegorz Rasiak	12 January 1979 (aged 27)	30	(England) Tottenham Hotspur
12	GK	Tomasz Kuszczak	23 March 1982 (aged 24)	4	(England) West Bromwich Albion
13	MF	Sebastian Mila	10 July 1982 (aged 23)	27	Austria Wien
14	DF	Michał Żewłakow	22 April 1976 (aged 30)	56	(Belgium) Anderlecht
15	FW	Ebi Smolarek	9 January 1981 (aged 25)	13	(Germany) Borussia Dortmund
16	MF	Arkadiusz Radomski	27 June 1977 (aged 28)	20	Austria Wien
17	MF	Dariusz Dudka	9 December 1983 (aged 22)	7	(Poland) Wisła Kraków
18	DF	Mariusz Lewandowski	18 May 1979 (aged 27)	25	(Ukraine) Shakhtar Donetsk
19	DF	Bartosz Bosacki	20 December 1975 (aged 30)	11	(Poland) Lech Poznań
20	MF	Piotr Giza	28 February 1980 (aged 26)	4	(Poland) Cracovia
21	FW	Ireneusz Jeleń	9 April 1981 (aged 25)	9	(Poland) Wisła Płock
22	GK	Łukasz Fabiański	18 April 1985 (aged 21)	2	(Poland) Legia Warsaw
23	FW	Paweł Brożek	21 April 1983 (aged 23)	4	(Poland) Wisła Kraków

== Group B ==
=== England ===
Head coach: (Sweden) Sven-Göran Eriksson

No.	Pos.	Player	Date of birth (age)	Caps	Club
1	GK	Paul Robinson	15 October 1979 (aged 26)	21	(England) Tottenham Hotspur
2	DF	Gary Neville	18 February 1975 (aged 31)	79	(England) Manchester United
3	DF	Ashley Cole	20 December 1980 (aged 25)	46	(England) Arsenal
4	MF	Steven Gerrard	30 May 1980 (aged 26)	42	(England) Liverpool
5	DF	Rio Ferdinand	7 November 1978 (aged 27)	47	(England) Manchester United
6	DF	John Terry	7 December 1980 (aged 25)	24	(England) Chelsea
7	MF	David Beckham (c)	2 May 1975 (aged 31)	89	(Spain) Real Madrid
8	MF	Frank Lampard	20 June 1978 (aged 27)	40	(England) Chelsea
9	FW	Wayne Rooney	24 October 1985 (aged 20)	29	(England) Manchester United
10	FW	Michael Owen	14 December 1979 (aged 26)	77	(England) Newcastle United
11	MF	Joe Cole	8 November 1981 (aged 24)	32	(England) Chelsea
12	DF	Sol Campbell	18 September 1974 (aged 31)	68	(England) Arsenal
13	GK	David James	1 August 1970 (aged 35)	34	(England) Manchester City
14	DF	Wayne Bridge	5 August 1980 (aged 25)	23	(England) Chelsea
15	DF	Jamie Carragher	28 January 1978 (aged 28)	25	(England) Liverpool
16	MF	Owen Hargreaves	20 January 1981 (aged 25)	30	(Germany) Bayern Munich
17	MF	Jermaine Jenas	18 February 1983 (aged 23)	15	(England) Tottenham Hotspur
18	MF	Michael Carrick	28 July 1981 (aged 24)	6	(England) Tottenham Hotspur
19	MF	Aaron Lennon	16 April 1987 (aged 19)	1	(England) Tottenham Hotspur
20	MF	Stewart Downing	22 July 1984 (aged 21)	2	(England) Middlesbrough
21	FW	Peter Crouch	30 January 1981 (aged 25)	7	(England) Liverpool
22	GK	Scott Carson	3 September 1985 (aged 20)	0	(England) Liverpool
23	FW	Theo Walcott	16 March 1989 (aged 17)	1	(England) Arsenal

=== Paraguay ===
Head coach: (Uruguay) Aníbal Ruiz

No.	Pos.	Player	Date of birth (age)	Caps	Club
1	GK	Justo Villar	30 June 1977 (aged 28)	39	(Argentina) Newell's Old Boys
2	DF	Jorge Núñez	22 January 1978 (aged 28)	15	(Argentina) Estudiantes
3	DF	Delio Toledo	2 October 1976 (aged 29)	30	(Spain) Zaragoza
4	DF	Carlos Gamarra (c)	17 February 1971 (aged 35)	106	(Brazil) Palmeiras
5	DF	Julio César Cáceres	5 October 1979 (aged 26)	32	(Argentina) River Plate
6	DF	Carlos Bonet	2 October 1977 (aged 28)	29	(Paraguay) Libertad
7	FW	Salvador Cabañas	5 August 1980 (aged 25)	15	(Mexico) Jaguares
8	MF	Édgar Barreto	15 July 1984 (aged 21)	15	(Netherlands) NEC
9	FW	Roque Santa Cruz	16 August 1981 (aged 24)	42	(Germany) Bayern Munich
10	MF	Roberto Acuña	25 March 1972 (aged 34)	93	(Spain) Deportivo La Coruña
11	MF	Diego Gavilán	1 March 1980 (aged 26)	39	(Argentina) Newell's Old Boys
12	GK	Derlis Gómez	2 November 1972 (aged 33)	5	(Paraguay) Sportivo Luqueño
13	MF	Carlos Paredes	16 July 1976 (aged 29)	68	(Italy) Reggina
14	DF	Paulo da Silva	1 February 1980 (aged 26)	33	(Mexico) Toluca
15	DF	Julio César Manzur	22 January 1981 (aged 25)	13	(Brazil) Santos
16	MF	Cristian Riveros	16 October 1982 (aged 23)	9	(Paraguay) Libertad
17	MF	José Montiel	19 March 1988 (aged 18)	6	(Paraguay) Olimpia
18	FW	Nelson Haedo Valdez	28 November 1983 (aged 22)	11	(Germany) Werder Bremen
19	MF	Julio dos Santos	7 May 1983 (aged 23)	17	(Germany) Bayern Munich
20	FW	Dante López	16 August 1983 (aged 22)	7	(Italy) Genoa
21	DF	Denis Caniza	29 August 1974 (aged 31)	74	(Mexico) Cruz Azul
22	GK	Aldo Bobadilla	20 April 1976 (aged 30)	5	(Paraguay) Libertad
23	FW	Nelson Cuevas	10 January 1980 (aged 26)	35	(Mexico) Pachuca

=== Sweden ===
Head coach: Lars Lagerbäck

No.	Pos.	Player	Date of birth (age)	Caps	Club
1	GK	Andreas Isaksson	3 October 1981 (aged 24)	39	(France) Rennes
2	DF	Mikael Nilsson	24 June 1978 (aged 27)	27	(Greece) Panathinaikos
3	DF	Olof Mellberg (c)	3 September 1977 (aged 28)	64	(England) Aston Villa
4	DF	Teddy Lučić	15 April 1973 (aged 33)	81	(Sweden) Häcken
5	DF	Erik Edman	11 November 1978 (aged 27)	37	(France) Rennes
6	MF	Tobias Linderoth	21 April 1979 (aged 27)	58	(Denmark) Copenhagen
7	MF	Niclas Alexandersson	29 December 1971 (aged 34)	87	(Sweden) IFK Göteborg
8	MF	Anders Svensson	17 July 1976 (aged 29)	66	(Sweden) Elfsborg
9	MF	Freddie Ljungberg	16 April 1977 (aged 29)	57	(England) Arsenal
10	FW	Zlatan Ibrahimović	3 October 1981 (aged 24)	38	(Italy) Juventus
11	FW	Henrik Larsson	20 September 1971 (aged 34)	89	(Spain) Barcelona
12	GK	John Alvbåge	10 August 1982 (aged 23)	2	(Denmark) Viborg
13	DF	Petter Hansson	14 December 1976 (aged 29)	13	(Netherlands) Heerenveen
14	DF	Fredrik Stenman	2 June 1983 (aged 23)	1	(Germany) Bayer Leverkusen
15	DF	Karl Svensson	21 March 1984 (aged 22)	1	(Sweden) IFK Göteborg
16	MF	Kim Källström	24 August 1982 (aged 23)	34	(France) Rennes
17	FW	Johan Elmander	27 May 1981 (aged 25)	18	(Denmark) Brøndby
18	MF	Mattias Jonson	16 January 1974 (aged 32)	53	(Sweden) Djurgården
19	MF	Daniel Andersson	28 August 1977 (aged 28)	47	(Sweden) Malmö FF
20	FW	Marcus Allbäck	5 July 1973 (aged 32)	56	(Denmark) Copenhagen
21	MF	Christian Wilhelmsson	8 December 1979 (aged 26)	29	(Belgium) Anderlecht
22	FW	Markus Rosenberg	27 September 1982 (aged 23)	8	(Netherlands) Ajax
23	GK	Rami Shaaban	30 June 1975 (aged 30)	1	(Norway) Fredrikstad

=== Trinidad and Tobago ===
Head coach: (Netherlands) Leo Beenhakker

No.	Pos.	Player	Date of birth (age)	Caps	Club
1	GK	Shaka Hislop	22 February 1969 (aged 37)	24	(England) West Ham United
2	DF	Ian Cox	25 March 1971 (aged 35)	16	(England) Gillingham
3	DF	Avery John	18 June 1975 (aged 30)	57	(United States) New England Revolution
4	DF	Marvin Andrews	22 December 1975 (aged 30)	98	(Scotland) Rangers
5	DF	Brent Sancho	13 March 1977 (aged 29)	40	(England) Gillingham
6	DF	Dennis Lawrence	1 August 1974 (aged 31)	63	(Wales) Wrexham
7	MF	Chris Birchall	5 May 1984 (aged 22)	19	(England) Port Vale
8	DF	Cyd Gray	21 November 1976 (aged 29)	39	(Trinidad and Tobago) San Juan Jabloteh
9	MF	Aurtis Whitley	1 May 1977 (aged 29)	24	(Trinidad and Tobago) San Juan Jabloteh
10	MF	Russell Latapy	2 August 1968 (aged 37)	66	(Scotland) Falkirk
11	DF	Carlos Edwards	24 October 1978 (aged 27)	51	(England) Luton Town
12	FW	Collin Samuel	27 August 1981 (aged 24)	18	(Scotland) Dundee United
13	FW	Cornell Glen	21 October 1980 (aged 25)	35	(United States) LA Galaxy
14	FW	Stern John	30 October 1976 (aged 29)	95	(England) Coventry City
15	FW	Kenwyne Jones	5 October 1984 (aged 21)	29	(England) Southampton
16	MF	Evans Wise	23 November 1973 (aged 32)	16	(Germany) Waldhof Mannheim
17	DF	David Atiba Charles	29 August 1977 (aged 28)	19	(Trinidad and Tobago) W Connection
18	MF	Densill Theobald	27 June 1982 (aged 23)	38	(Scotland) Falkirk
19	FW	Dwight Yorke (c)	3 November 1971 (aged 34)	54	(Australia) Sydney FC
20	FW	Jason Scotland	18 February 1979 (aged 27)	25	(Scotland) St. Johnstone
21	GK	Kelvin Jack	29 April 1976 (aged 30)	32	(Scotland) Dundee
22	GK	Clayton Ince	12 July 1972 (aged 33)	63	(England) Coventry City
23	MF	Anthony Wolfe	23 December 1983 (aged 22)	4	(Trinidad and Tobago) San Juan Jabloteh

== Group C ==
=== Argentina ===
Head coach: José Pekerman

No.	Pos.	Player	Date of birth (age)	Caps	Club
1	GK	Roberto Abbondanzieri	19 August 1972 (aged 33)	22	(Argentina) Boca Juniors
2	DF	Roberto Ayala	14 April 1973 (aged 33)	100	(Spain) Valencia
3	DF	Juan Pablo Sorín (c)	5 May 1976 (aged 30)	71	(Spain) Villarreal
4	DF	Fabricio Coloccini	22 January 1982 (aged 24)	23	(Spain) Deportivo La Coruña
5	MF	Esteban Cambiasso	18 August 1980 (aged 25)	22	(Italy) Inter Milan
6	DF	Gabriel Heinze	19 April 1978 (aged 28)	29	(England) Manchester United
7	FW	Javier Saviola	11 December 1981 (aged 24)	31	(Spain) Barcelona
8	MF	Javier Mascherano	8 June 1984 (aged 22)	15	(Brazil) Corinthians
9	FW	Hernán Crespo	5 July 1975 (aged 30)	55	(England) Chelsea
10	MF	Juan Román Riquelme	24 June 1978 (aged 27)	31	(Spain) Villarreal
11	FW	Carlos Tevez	5 February 1984 (aged 22)	21	(Brazil) Corinthians
12	GK	Leo Franco	29 May 1977 (aged 29)	3	(Spain) Atlético Madrid
13	DF	Lionel Scaloni	16 May 1978 (aged 28)	6	(Spain) Deportivo La Coruña
14	FW	Rodrigo Palacio	5 February 1982 (aged 24)	2	(Argentina) Boca Juniors
15	DF	Gabriel Milito	7 September 1980 (aged 25)	15	(Spain) Zaragoza
16	MF	Pablo Aimar	3 November 1979 (aged 26)	40	(Spain) Valencia
17	DF	Leandro Cufré	9 May 1978 (aged 28)	2	(Italy) Roma
18	MF	Maxi Rodríguez	2 January 1981 (aged 25)	13	(Spain) Atlético Madrid
19	FW	Lionel Messi	24 June 1987 (aged 18)	7	(Spain) Barcelona
20	FW	Julio Cruz	10 October 1974 (aged 31)	15	(Italy) Inter Milan
21	DF	Nicolás Burdisso	12 April 1981 (aged 25)	8	(Italy) Inter Milan
22	MF	Lucho González	19 January 1981 (aged 25)	27	(Portugal) Porto
23	GK	Oscar Ustari	3 July 1986 (aged 19)	0	(Argentina) Independiente

=== Ivory Coast ===
Head coach: (France) Henri Michel

No.	Pos.	Player	Date of birth (age)	Caps	Club
1	GK	Jean-Jacques Tizié	7 September 1972 (aged 33)	24	(Tunisia) Espérance de Tunis
2	MF	Kanga Akalé	7 March 1981 (aged 25)	22	(France) Auxerre
3	DF	Arthur Boka	2 April 1983 (aged 23)	23	(France) Strasbourg
4	DF	Kolo Touré	19 March 1981 (aged 25)	42	(England) Arsenal
5	MF	Didier Zokora	14 December 1980 (aged 25)	38	(France) Saint-Étienne
6	DF	Blaise Kouassi	2 February 1975 (aged 31)	36	(France) Troyes
7	MF	Emerse Faé	24 January 1984 (aged 22)	14	(France) Nantes
8	MF	Bonaventure Kalou	12 January 1978 (aged 28)	49	(France) Paris Saint-Germain
9	FW	Arouna Koné	11 November 1983 (aged 22)	17	(Netherlands) PSV Eindhoven
10	MF	Gilles Yapi Yapo	13 January 1982 (aged 24)	26	(Switzerland) Young Boys
11	FW	Didier Drogba (c)	11 March 1978 (aged 28)	32	(England) Chelsea
12	DF	Abdoulaye Méïté	6 October 1980 (aged 25)	18	(France) Marseille
13	DF	Marco Zoro	27 December 1983 (aged 22)	13	(Italy) Messina
14	FW	Bakari Koné	17 September 1981 (aged 24)	16	(France) Nice
15	FW	Aruna Dindane	26 November 1980 (aged 25)	34	(France) Lens
16	GK	Gérard Gnanhouan	12 February 1979 (aged 27)	6	(France) Montpellier
17	DF	Cyril Domoraud	22 July 1971 (aged 34)	50	(France) Créteil
18	MF	Abdul Kader Keïta	6 August 1981 (aged 24)	26	(France) Lille
19	MF	Yaya Touré	13 March 1983 (aged 23)	14	(Greece) Olympiacos
20	DF	Guy Demel	13 June 1981 (aged 24)	7	(Germany) Hamburger SV
21	DF	Emmanuel Eboué	4 June 1983 (aged 23)	11	(England) Arsenal
22	MF	Romaric	4 June 1983 (aged 23)	8	(France) Le Mans
23	GK	Boubacar Barry	30 December 1979 (aged 26)	6	(Belgium) Beveren

=== Netherlands ===
Head coach: Marco van Basten

No.	Pos.	Player	Date of birth (age)	Caps	Club
1	GK	Edwin van der Sar (c)	29 October 1970 (aged 35)	109	(England) Manchester United
2	DF	Kew Jaliens	15 September 1978 (aged 27)	1	(Netherlands) AZ
3	DF	Khalid Boulahrouz	28 December 1981 (aged 24)	11	(Germany) Hamburger SV
4	DF	Joris Mathijsen	5 April 1980 (aged 26)	8	(Netherlands) AZ
5	DF	Giovanni van Bronckhorst	5 February 1975 (aged 31)	57	(Spain) Barcelona
6	MF	Denny Landzaat	6 May 1976 (aged 30)	23	(Netherlands) AZ
7	FW	Dirk Kuyt	22 July 1980 (aged 25)	19	(Netherlands) Feyenoord
8	MF	Phillip Cocu	29 October 1970 (aged 35)	97	(Netherlands) PSV Eindhoven
9	FW	Ruud van Nistelrooy	1 July 1976 (aged 29)	51	(England) Manchester United
10	MF	Rafael van der Vaart	11 February 1983 (aged 23)	35	(Germany) Hamburger SV
11	MF	Arjen Robben	23 January 1984 (aged 22)	20	(England) Chelsea
12	DF	Jan Kromkamp	17 August 1980 (aged 25)	11	(England) Liverpool
13	DF	André Ooijer	11 July 1974 (aged 31)	19	(Netherlands) PSV Eindhoven
14	DF	John Heitinga	15 November 1983 (aged 22)	18	(Netherlands) Ajax
15	DF	Tim de Cler	8 November 1978 (aged 27)	3	(Netherlands) AZ
16	MF	Hedwiges Maduro	13 February 1985 (aged 21)	11	(Netherlands) Ajax
17	FW	Robin van Persie	6 August 1983 (aged 22)	10	(England) Arsenal
18	MF	Mark van Bommel	22 April 1977 (aged 29)	37	(Spain) Barcelona
19	FW	Jan Vennegoor of Hesselink	7 November 1978 (aged 27)	7	(Netherlands) PSV Eindhoven
20	MF	Wesley Sneijder	9 June 1984 (aged 22)	23	(Netherlands) Ajax
21	FW	Ryan Babel	19 December 1986 (aged 19)	6	(Netherlands) Ajax
22	GK	Henk Timmer	3 December 1971 (aged 34)	2	(Netherlands) AZ
23	GK	Maarten Stekelenburg	22 September 1982 (aged 23)	2	(Netherlands) Ajax

=== Serbia and Montenegro ===
Head coach: Ilija Petković

No.	Pos.	Player	Date of birth (age)	Caps	Club
1	GK	Dragoslav Jevrić	8 July 1974 (aged 31)	40	(Turkey) Ankaraspor
2	MF	Ivan Ergić	21 January 1981 (aged 25)	1	(Switzerland) Basel
3	DF	Ivica Dragutinović	13 November 1975 (aged 30)	27	(Spain) Sevilla
4	MF	Igor Duljaj	29 October 1979 (aged 26)	37	(Ukraine) Shakhtar Donetsk
5	DF	Nemanja Vidić	21 October 1981 (aged 24)	20	(England) Manchester United
6	DF	Goran Gavrančić	2 August 1978 (aged 27)	25	(Ukraine) Dynamo Kyiv
7	MF	Ognjen Koroman	19 September 1978 (aged 27)	25	(England) Portsmouth
8	FW	Mateja Kežman	12 April 1979 (aged 27)	47	(Spain) Atlético Madrid
9	FW	Savo Milošević (c)	2 September 1973 (aged 32)	98	(Spain) Osasuna
10	MF	Dejan Stanković	11 September 1978 (aged 27)	58	(Italy) Inter Milan
11	MF	Predrag Đorđević	4 August 1972 (aged 33)	34	(Greece) Olympiacos
12	GK	Oliver Kovačević	29 December 1974 (aged 31)	3	(Bulgaria) CSKA Sofia
13	DF	Dušan Basta	18 August 1984 (aged 21)	2	(Serbia and Montenegro) Red Star Belgrade
14	DF	Nenad Đorđević	7 August 1979 (aged 26)	15	(Serbia and Montenegro) Partizan
15	DF	Milan Dudić	1 November 1979 (aged 26)	11	(Serbia and Montenegro) Red Star Belgrade
16	DF	Dušan Petković	13 June 1974 (aged 31)	7	(Serbia and Montenegro) OFK Beograd
17	MF	Albert Nađ	29 October 1974 (aged 31)	42	(Serbia and Montenegro) Partizan
18	MF	Zvonimir Vukić	19 July 1979 (aged 26)	25	(Ukraine) Shakhtar Donetsk
19	FW	Nikola Žigić	25 September 1980 (aged 25)	11	(Serbia and Montenegro) Red Star Belgrade
20	DF	Mladen Krstajić	4 March 1974 (aged 32)	45	(Germany) Schalke 04
21	FW	Danijel Ljuboja	4 September 1978 (aged 27)	15	(Germany) VfB Stuttgart
22	MF	Saša Ilić	30 December 1977 (aged 28)	32	(Turkey) Galatasaray
23	GK	Vladimir Stojković	28 July 1983 (aged 22)	0	(Serbia and Montenegro) Red Star Belgrade

== Group D ==
=== Angola ===
Head coach: Luis Oliveira Gonçalves

No.	Pos.	Player	Date of birth (age)	Caps	Club
1	GK	João Ricardo	7 January 1970 (aged 36)	26	Unattached
2	DF	Marco Airosa	6 August 1984 (aged 21)	2	(Portugal) Barreirense
3	DF	Jamba	10 July 1977 (aged 28)	35	(Angola) ASA
4	DF	Lebo Lebo	29 May 1977 (aged 29)	15	(Angola) Petro Atlético
5	DF	Kali	11 October 1978 (aged 27)	21	(Portugal) Barreirense
6	MF	Miloy	27 May 1981 (aged 25)	11	(Angola) Interclube
7	MF	Paulo Figueiredo	28 November 1972 (aged 33)	22	(Portugal) Varzim
8	MF	André Macanga	14 May 1978 (aged 28)	33	(Kuwait) Al-Salmiya
9	FW	Mantorras	18 March 1982 (aged 24)	11	(Portugal) Benfica
10	FW	Akwá (c)	30 May 1977 (aged 29)	77	Unattached
11	FW	Mateus	19 June 1984 (aged 21)	4	(Portugal) Gil Vicente
12	GK	Lamá	1 February 1981 (aged 25)	9	(Angola) Petro Atlético
13	MF	Edson Nobre	3 February 1980 (aged 26)	7	(Portugal) Paços de Ferreira
14	MF	Mendonça	9 October 1982 (aged 23)	34	(Portugal) Varzim
15	DF	Rui Marques	3 September 1977 (aged 28)	1	(England) Leeds United
16	FW	Flávio	20 December 1979 (aged 26)	46	(Egypt) Al Ahly
17	MF	Zé Kalanga	12 October 1983 (aged 22)	23	(Angola) Petro Atlético
18	FW	Love	14 March 1979 (aged 27)	35	(Angola) ASA
19	FW	Titi Buengo	11 February 1980 (aged 26)	2	(France) Clermont
20	DF	Locó	25 December 1984 (aged 21)	11	(Angola) Primeiro Agosto
21	DF	Delgado	1 November 1979 (aged 26)	17	(Angola) Petro Atlético
22	GK	Mário Hipólito	1 June 1985 (aged 21)	1	(Angola) Interclube
23	DF	Marco Abreu	8 December 1974 (aged 31)	3	(Portugal) Portimonense

=== Iran ===
Head coach: (Croatia) Branko Ivanković

No.	Pos.	Player	Date of birth (age)	Caps	Club
1	GK	Ebrahim Mirzapour	16 September 1978 (aged 27)	64	(Iran) Foolad
2	MF	Mehdi Mahdavikia	24 July 1977 (aged 28)	89	(Germany) Hamburger SV
3	DF	Sohrab Bakhtiarizadeh	11 September 1973 (aged 32)	31	(Iran) Saba Battery
4	DF	Yahya Golmohammadi	19 March 1971 (aged 35)	69	(Iran) Saba Battery
5	DF	Rahman Rezaei	20 February 1975 (aged 31)	43	(Italy) Messina
6	MF	Javad Nekounam	7 September 1980 (aged 25)	71	(United Arab Emirates) Al-Sharjah
7	MF	Ferydoon Zandi	26 April 1979 (aged 27)	10	(Germany) 1. FC Kaiserslautern
8	MF	Ali Karimi	8 November 1978 (aged 27)	90	(Germany) Bayern Munich
9	FW	Vahid Hashemian	21 July 1976 (aged 29)	28	(Germany) Hannover 96
10	FW	Ali Daei (c)	21 March 1969 (aged 37)	147	(Iran) Saba Battery
11	FW	Rasoul Khatibi	22 September 1978 (aged 27)	12	(Iran) Sepahan
12	GK	Hassan Roudbarian	6 July 1978 (aged 27)	3	(Iran) Pas
13	DF	Hossein Kaebi	23 September 1985 (aged 20)	44	(Iran) Foolad
14	MF	Andranik Teymourian	6 March 1983 (aged 23)	7	(Iran) Abu Moslem
15	FW	Arash Borhani	14 September 1983 (aged 22)	20	(Iran) Pas
16	FW	Reza Enayati	23 September 1976 (aged 29)	15	(Iran) Esteghlal
17	FW	Javad Kazemian	23 April 1981 (aged 25)	25	(Iran) Persepolis
18	MF	Moharram Navidkia	1 November 1982 (aged 23)	24	(Germany) VfL Bochum
19	DF	Amir Hossein Sadeghi	6 September 1981 (aged 24)	1	(Iran) Esteghlal
20	DF	Mohammad Nosrati	11 January 1982 (aged 24)	44	(Iran) Pas
21	MF	Mehrzad Madanchi	12 October 1982 (aged 23)	6	(Iran) Persepolis
22	GK	Vahid Talebloo	26 May 1982 (aged 24)	1	(Iran) Esteghlal
23	MF	Masoud Shojaei	9 June 1984 (aged 22)	3	(Iran) Saipa

=== Mexico ===
Head coach: (Argentina) Ricardo La Volpe

No.	Pos.	Player	Date of birth (age)	Caps	Club
1	GK	Oswaldo Sánchez	21 September 1973 (aged 32)	70	(Mexico) Guadalajara
2	DF	Claudio Suárez	17 December 1968 (aged 37)	178	(United States) Chivas USA
3	DF	Carlos Salcido	2 April 1980 (aged 26)	32	(Mexico) Guadalajara
4	DF	Rafael Márquez (c)	13 February 1979 (aged 27)	65	(Spain) Barcelona
5	DF	Ricardo Osorio	30 March 1980 (aged 26)	39	(Mexico) Cruz Azul
6	MF	Gerardo Torrado	30 April 1979 (aged 27)	56	(Mexico) Cruz Azul
7	MF	Sinha	23 May 1976 (aged 30)	32	(Mexico) Toluca
8	MF	Pável Pardo	26 July 1976 (aged 29)	125	(Mexico) América
9	FW	Jared Borgetti	14 August 1973 (aged 32)	75	(England) Bolton Wanderers
10	FW	Guillermo Franco	3 November 1976 (aged 29)	7	(Spain) Villarreal
11	MF	Ramón Morales	10 October 1975 (aged 30)	46	(Mexico) Guadalajara
12	GK	José de Jesús Corona	26 January 1981 (aged 25)	6	(Mexico) Tecos
13	GK	Guillermo Ochoa	13 July 1985 (aged 20)	1	(Mexico) América
14	DF	Gonzalo Pineda	19 October 1982 (aged 23)	30	(Mexico) Guadalajara
15	DF	José Antonio Castro	11 August 1980 (aged 25)	12	(Mexico) América
16	DF	Mario Méndez	1 June 1979 (aged 27)	32	(Mexico) Monterrey
17	FW	Francisco Fonseca	2 October 1979 (aged 26)	29	(Mexico) Cruz Azul
18	MF	Andrés Guardado	28 September 1986 (aged 19)	7	(Mexico) Atlas
19	FW	Omar Bravo	4 March 1980 (aged 26)	33	(Mexico) Guadalajara
20	MF	Rafael García	14 August 1974 (aged 31)	52	(Mexico) Atlas
21	MF	Jesús Arellano	8 May 1973 (aged 33)	69	(Mexico) Monterrey
22	DF	Francisco Javier Rodríguez	20 October 1981 (aged 24)	32	(Mexico) Guadalajara
23	MF	Luis Ernesto Pérez	12 January 1981 (aged 25)	52	(Mexico) Monterrey

=== Portugal ===
Head coach: (Brazil) Luiz Felipe Scolari

No.	Pos.	Player	Date of birth (age)	Caps	Club
1	GK	Ricardo	11 February 1976 (aged 30)	49	(Portugal) Sporting CP
2	DF	Paulo Ferreira	18 January 1979 (aged 27)	30	(England) Chelsea
3	DF	Marco Caneira	9 February 1979 (aged 27)	14	(Spain) Valencia
4	DF	Ricardo Costa	16 May 1981 (aged 25)	3	(Portugal) Porto
5	DF	Fernando Meira	5 June 1978 (aged 28)	30	(Germany) VfB Stuttgart
6	MF	Costinha	1 December 1974 (aged 31)	44	(Russia) Dynamo Moscow
7	MF	Luís Figo (c)	4 November 1972 (aged 33)	120	(Italy) Inter Milan
8	MF	Petit	25 September 1976 (aged 29)	36	(Portugal) Benfica
9	FW	Pauleta	28 April 1973 (aged 33)	82	(France) Paris Saint-Germain
10	MF	Hugo Viana	15 January 1983 (aged 23)	21	(Spain) Valencia
11	MF	Simão	31 October 1979 (aged 26)	43	(Portugal) Benfica
12	GK	Quim	13 November 1975 (aged 30)	24	(Portugal) Benfica
13	DF	Miguel	4 January 1980 (aged 26)	28	(Spain) Valencia
14	DF	Nuno Valente	12 September 1974 (aged 31)	23	(England) Everton
15	MF	Luís Boa Morte	4 August 1977 (aged 28)	24	(England) Fulham
16	DF	Ricardo Carvalho	18 May 1978 (aged 28)	24	(England) Chelsea
17	FW	Cristiano Ronaldo	5 February 1985 (aged 21)	32	(England) Manchester United
18	MF	Maniche	11 November 1977 (aged 28)	31	(Russia) Dynamo Moscow
19	MF	Tiago	2 May 1981 (aged 25)	22	(France) Lyon
20	MF	Deco	27 August 1977 (aged 28)	35	(Spain) Barcelona
21	FW	Nuno Gomes	5 July 1976 (aged 29)	53	(Portugal) Benfica
22	GK	Paulo Santos	11 December 1972 (aged 33)	1	(Portugal) Braga
23	FW	Hélder Postiga	2 August 1982 (aged 23)	24	(Portugal) Porto

== Group E ==
=== Czech Republic ===
Head coach: Karel Brückner

No.	Pos.	Player	Date of birth (age)	Caps	Club
1	GK	Petr Čech	20 May 1982 (aged 24)	41	(England) Chelsea
2	DF	Zdeněk Grygera	14 May 1980 (aged 26)	41	(Netherlands) Ajax
3	DF	Pavel Mareš	18 January 1976 (aged 30)	10	(Russia) Zenit Saint Petersburg
4	MF	Tomáš Galásek (c)	15 January 1973 (aged 33)	49	(Netherlands) Ajax
5	DF	Radoslav Kováč	11 November 1979 (aged 26)	6	(Russia) Spartak Moscow
6	DF	Marek Jankulovski	9 May 1977 (aged 29)	48	(Italy) AC Milan
7	MF	Libor Sionko	1 February 1977 (aged 29)	17	Austria Wien
8	MF	Karel Poborský	30 March 1972 (aged 34)	115	(Czech Republic) Dynamo České Budějovice
9	FW	Jan Koller	30 March 1973 (aged 33)	68	(Germany) Borussia Dortmund
10	MF	Tomáš Rosický	4 October 1980 (aged 25)	54	(Germany) Borussia Dortmund
11	MF	Pavel Nedvěd	30 August 1972 (aged 33)	87	(Italy) Juventus
12	FW	Vratislav Lokvenc	27 September 1973 (aged 32)	72	(Austria) Red Bull Salzburg
13	DF	Martin Jiránek	25 May 1979 (aged 27)	24	(Russia) Spartak Moscow
14	MF	David Jarolím	17 May 1979 (aged 27)	3	(Germany) Hamburger SV
15	FW	Milan Baroš	28 October 1981 (aged 24)	49	(England) Aston Villa
16	GK	Jaromír Blažek	29 December 1972 (aged 33)	11	(Czech Republic) Sparta Prague
17	FW	Jiří Štajner	27 May 1976 (aged 30)	21	(Germany) Hannover 96
18	FW	Marek Heinz	4 August 1977 (aged 28)	28	(Turkey) Galatasaray
19	MF	Jan Polák	14 March 1981 (aged 25)	18	(Germany) 1. FC Nürnberg
20	MF	Jaroslav Plašil	5 January 1982 (aged 24)	14	(France) Monaco
21	DF	Tomáš Ujfaluši	24 March 1978 (aged 28)	48	(Italy) Fiorentina
22	DF	David Rozehnal	5 July 1980 (aged 25)	22	(France) Paris Saint-Germain
23	GK	Antonín Kinský	31 May 1975 (aged 31)	5	(Russia) Saturn Ramenskoye

=== Ghana ===
Head coach: (Serbia) Ratomir Dujković

No.	Pos.	Player	Date of birth (age)	Caps	Club
1	GK	Sammy Adjei	1 September 1980 (aged 25)	31	(Israel) Ashdod
2	MF	Hans Sarpei	28 June 1976 (aged 29)	7	(Germany) VfL Wolfsburg
3	FW	Asamoah Gyan	22 November 1985 (aged 20)	13	(Italy) Udinese
4	DF	Samuel Kuffour	3 September 1976 (aged 29)	58	(Italy) Roma
5	DF	John Mensah	29 November 1982 (aged 23)	33	(France) Rennes
6	DF	Emmanuel Pappoe	3 March 1981 (aged 25)	27	(Israel) Hapoel Kfar Saba
7	DF	Illiasu Shilla	26 October 1982 (aged 23)	2	(Ghana) Asante Kotoko
8	MF	Michael Essien	3 December 1982 (aged 23)	17	(England) Chelsea
9	MF	Derek Boateng	2 May 1983 (aged 23)	11	(Sweden) AIK
10	MF	Stephen Appiah (c)	24 December 1980 (aged 25)	42	(Turkey) Fenerbahçe
11	MF	Sulley Muntari	27 August 1984 (aged 21)	16	(Italy) Udinese
12	FW	Alex Tachie-Mensah	15 February 1977 (aged 29)	5	(Switzerland) St. Gallen
13	DF	Habib Mohamed	10 December 1983 (aged 22)	1	(Ghana) King Faisal Babes
14	FW	Matthew Amoah	24 October 1980 (aged 25)	16	(Germany) Borussia Dortmund
15	MF	John Paintsil	15 June 1981 (aged 24)	21	(Israel) Hapoel Tel Aviv
16	GK	George Owu	17 June 1982 (aged 23)	6	(Ghana) Ashanti Gold
17	DF	Daniel Quaye	25 December 1980 (aged 25)	7	(Ghana) Hearts of Oak
18	DF	Eric Addo	12 November 1978 (aged 27)	6	(Netherlands) PSV Eindhoven
19	FW	Razak Pimpong	30 December 1982 (aged 23)	4	(Denmark) Copenhagen
20	FW	Otto Addo	9 June 1975 (aged 31)	13	(Germany) Mainz 05
21	DF	Issah Ahmed	24 May 1982 (aged 24)	10	(Denmark) Randers
22	GK	Richard Kingson	13 June 1978 (aged 27)	33	(Turkey) Ankaraspor
23	MF	Haminu Draman	1 April 1986 (aged 20)	7	(Serbia) Red Star Belgrade

=== Italy ===
Head coach: Marcello Lippi

No.	Pos.	Player	Date of birth (age)	Caps	Club
1	GK	Gianluigi Buffon	28 January 1978 (aged 28)	60	(Italy) Juventus
2	DF	Cristian Zaccardo	21 December 1981 (aged 24)	12	(Italy) Palermo
3	DF	Fabio Grosso	28 November 1977 (aged 28)	17	(Italy) Palermo
4	MF	Daniele De Rossi	24 July 1983 (aged 22)	17	(Italy) Roma
5	DF	Fabio Cannavaro (c)	13 September 1973 (aged 32)	93	(Italy) Juventus
6	DF	Andrea Barzagli	8 May 1981 (aged 25)	8	(Italy) Palermo
7	FW	Alessandro Del Piero	9 November 1974 (aged 31)	74	(Italy) Juventus
8	MF	Gennaro Gattuso	9 January 1978 (aged 28)	43	(Italy) Milan
9	FW	Luca Toni	26 May 1977 (aged 29)	18	(Italy) Fiorentina
10	FW	Francesco Totti	27 September 1976 (aged 29)	51	(Italy) Roma
11	FW	Alberto Gilardino	5 July 1982 (aged 23)	15	(Italy) Milan
12	GK	Angelo Peruzzi	16 February 1970 (aged 36)	31	(Italy) Lazio
13	DF	Alessandro Nesta	19 March 1976 (aged 30)	74	(Italy) Milan
14	GK	Marco Amelia	2 April 1982 (aged 24)	1	(Italy) Livorno
15	FW	Vincenzo Iaquinta	21 November 1979 (aged 26)	12	(Italy) Udinese
16	MF	Mauro Camoranesi	4 October 1976 (aged 29)	21	(Italy) Juventus
17	MF	Simone Barone	30 April 1978 (aged 28)	13	(Italy) Palermo
18	FW	Filippo Inzaghi	9 August 1973 (aged 32)	49	(Italy) Milan
19	DF	Gianluca Zambrotta	19 February 1977 (aged 29)	52	(Italy) Juventus
20	MF	Simone Perrotta	17 September 1977 (aged 28)	24	(Italy) Roma
21	MF	Andrea Pirlo	19 May 1979 (aged 27)	24	(Italy) Milan
22	DF	Massimo Oddo	14 June 1976 (aged 29)	20	(Italy) Lazio
23	DF	Marco Materazzi	19 August 1973 (aged 32)	28	(Italy) Internazionale

=== United States ===
Head coach: Bruce Arena

No.	Pos.	Player	Date of birth (age)	Caps	Club
1	GK	Tim Howard	6 March 1979 (aged 27)	16	(England) Manchester United
2	DF	Chris Albright	14 January 1979 (aged 27)	20	(United States) LA Galaxy
3	DF	Carlos Bocanegra	25 May 1979 (aged 27)	40	(England) Fulham
4	MF	Pablo Mastroeni	26 August 1976 (aged 29)	48	(United States) Colorado Rapids
5	MF	John O'Brien	29 August 1977 (aged 28)	31	(United States) Chivas USA
6	DF	Steve Cherundolo	19 February 1979 (aged 27)	35	(Germany) Hannover 96
7	MF	Eddie Lewis	17 May 1974 (aged 32)	69	(England) Leeds United
8	MF	Clint Dempsey	9 March 1983 (aged 23)	21	(United States) New England Revolution
9	FW	Eddie Johnson	31 March 1984 (aged 22)	18	(United States) Kansas City Wizards
10	MF	Claudio Reyna (c)	20 July 1973 (aged 32)	109	(England) Manchester City
11	FW	Brian Ching	24 May 1978 (aged 28)	20	(United States) Houston Dynamo
12	DF	Gregg Berhalter	1 August 1973 (aged 32)	44	(Germany) Energie Cottbus
13	DF	Jimmy Conrad	12 February 1977 (aged 29)	15	(United States) Kansas City Wizards
14	MF	Ben Olsen	3 May 1977 (aged 29)	34	(United States) D.C. United
15	MF	Bobby Convey	27 May 1983 (aged 23)	39	(England) Reading
16	FW	Josh Wolff	25 February 1977 (aged 29)	47	(United States) Kansas City Wizards
17	MF	DaMarcus Beasley	24 May 1982 (aged 24)	58	(Netherlands) PSV Eindhoven
18	GK	Kasey Keller	29 November 1969 (aged 36)	93	(Germany) Borussia Mönchengladbach
19	GK	Marcus Hahnemann	15 June 1972 (aged 33)	6	(England) Reading
20	FW	Brian McBride	19 June 1972 (aged 33)	92	(England) Fulham
21	FW	Landon Donovan	4 March 1982 (aged 24)	81	(United States) LA Galaxy
22	DF	Oguchi Onyewu	13 May 1982 (aged 24)	14	(Belgium) Standard Liège
23	DF	Eddie Pope	24 December 1973 (aged 32)	80	(United States) Real Salt Lake

== Group F ==
=== Australia ===
Head coach: (Netherlands) Guus Hiddink

No.	Pos.	Player	Date of birth (age)	Caps	Club
1	GK	Mark Schwarzer	6 October 1972 (aged 33)	37	(England) Middlesbrough
2	DF	Lucas Neill	9 March 1978 (aged 28)	25	(England) Blackburn Rovers
3	DF	Craig Moore	12 December 1975 (aged 30)	33	(England) Newcastle United
4	MF	Tim Cahill	6 December 1979 (aged 26)	16	(England) Everton
5	MF	Jason Culina	5 August 1980 (aged 25)	13	(Netherlands) PSV Eindhoven
6	DF	Tony Popovic	4 July 1973 (aged 32)	56	(England) Crystal Palace
7	DF	Brett Emerton	22 February 1979 (aged 27)	48	(England) Blackburn Rovers
8	MF	Josip Skoko	10 December 1975 (aged 30)	46	(England) Wigan Athletic
9	FW	Mark Viduka (c)	9 October 1975 (aged 30)	33	(England) Middlesbrough
10	FW	Harry Kewell	22 September 1978 (aged 27)	20	(England) Liverpool
11	DF	Stan Lazaridis	16 August 1972 (aged 33)	59	(England) Birmingham City
12	GK	Ante Covic	13 June 1975 (aged 30)	1	(Sweden) Hammarby
13	MF	Vince Grella	5 October 1979 (aged 26)	17	(Italy) Parma
14	MF	Scott Chipperfield	30 December 1975 (aged 30)	46	(Switzerland) Basel
15	FW	John Aloisi	5 February 1976 (aged 30)	41	(Spain) Alavés
16	DF	Michael Beauchamp	8 March 1981 (aged 25)	2	(Australia) Central Coast Mariners
17	FW	Archie Thompson	23 October 1978 (aged 27)	20	(Australia) Melbourne Victory
18	GK	Zeljko Kalac	16 December 1972 (aged 33)	52	(Italy) AC Milan
19	FW	Joshua Kennedy	20 August 1982 (aged 23)	1	(Germany) Dynamo Dresden
20	DF	Luke Wilkshire	2 October 1981 (aged 24)	8	(England) Bristol City
21	MF	Mile Sterjovski	27 May 1979 (aged 27)	22	(Switzerland) Basel
22	DF	Mark Milligan	4 August 1985 (aged 20)	1	(Australia) Sydney FC
23	MF	Mark Bresciano	11 February 1980 (aged 26)	24	(Italy) Parma

=== Brazil ===
Head coach: Carlos Alberto Parreira

No.	Pos.	Player	Date of birth (age)	Caps	Club
1	GK	Dida	7 October 1973 (aged 32)	86	(Italy) AC Milan
2	DF	Cafu (c)	7 June 1970 (aged 36)	138	(Italy) AC Milan
3	DF	Lúcio	8 May 1978 (aged 28)	50	(Germany) Bayern Munich
4	DF	Juan	1 February 1979 (aged 27)	38	(Germany) Bayer Leverkusen
5	MF	Emerson	4 April 1976 (aged 30)	70	(Italy) Juventus
6	DF	Roberto Carlos	10 April 1973 (aged 33)	121	(Spain) Real Madrid
7	FW	Adriano	17 February 1982 (aged 24)	32	(Italy) Inter Milan
8	MF	Kaká	22 April 1982 (aged 24)	38	(Italy) AC Milan
9	FW	Ronaldo	22 September 1976 (aged 29)	92	(Spain) Real Madrid
10	MF	Ronaldinho	21 March 1980 (aged 26)	63	(Spain) Barcelona
11	MF	Zé Roberto	6 July 1974 (aged 31)	79	(Germany) Bayern Munich
12	GK	Rogério Ceni	22 January 1973 (aged 33)	15	(Brazil) São Paulo
13	DF	Cicinho	24 June 1980 (aged 25)	10	(Spain) Real Madrid
14	DF	Luisão	13 February 1981 (aged 25)	19	(Portugal) Benfica
15	DF	Cris	3 June 1977 (aged 29)	16	(France) Lyon
16	DF	Gilberto	25 April 1976 (aged 30)	9	(Germany) Hertha BSC
17	MF	Gilberto Silva	7 October 1976 (aged 29)	36	(England) Arsenal
18	MF	Mineiro	2 August 1975 (aged 30)	2	(Brazil) São Paulo
19	MF	Juninho Pernambucano	30 January 1975 (aged 31)	37	(France) Lyon
20	MF	Ricardinho	23 May 1976 (aged 30)	19	(Brazil) Corinthians
21	FW	Fred	3 October 1983 (aged 22)	3	(France) Lyon
22	GK	Júlio César	3 September 1979 (aged 26)	11	(Italy) Inter Milan
23	FW	Robinho	25 January 1984 (aged 22)	23	(Spain) Real Madrid

=== Croatia ===
Head coach: Zlatko Kranjčar

No.	Pos.	Player	Date of birth (age)	Caps	Club
1	GK	Stipe Pletikosa	8 January 1979 (aged 27)	50	(Ukraine) Shakhtar Donetsk
2	MF	Darijo Srna	1 May 1982 (aged 24)	36	(Ukraine) Shakhtar Donetsk
3	DF	Josip Šimunić	18 February 1978 (aged 28)	42	(Germany) Hertha BSC
4	DF	Robert Kovač	6 April 1974 (aged 32)	56	(Italy) Juventus
5	DF	Igor Tudor	16 April 1978 (aged 28)	52	(Italy) Juventus
6	MF	Jurica Vranješ	31 January 1980 (aged 26)	24	(Germany) Werder Bremen
7	DF	Dario Šimić	12 November 1975 (aged 30)	80	(Italy) AC Milan
8	DF	Marko Babić	28 January 1981 (aged 25)	33	(Germany) Bayer Leverkusen
9	FW	Dado Pršo	5 November 1974 (aged 31)	29	(Scotland) Rangers
10	MF	Niko Kovač (c)	15 October 1971 (aged 34)	58	(Germany) Hertha BSC
11	DF	Mario Tokić	23 June 1975 (aged 30)	28	Austria Wien
12	GK	Joey Didulica	14 October 1977 (aged 28)	4	Austria Wien
13	DF	Stjepan Tomas	6 March 1976 (aged 30)	48	(Turkey) Galatasaray
14	MF	Luka Modrić	9 September 1985 (aged 20)	5	(Croatia) Dinamo Zagreb
15	MF	Ivan Leko	7 February 1978 (aged 28)	13	(Belgium) Club Brugge
16	MF	Jerko Leko	9 April 1980 (aged 26)	36	(Ukraine) Dynamo Kyiv
17	FW	Ivan Klasnić	29 January 1980 (aged 26)	20	(Germany) Werder Bremen
18	FW	Ivica Olić	14 September 1979 (aged 26)	36	(Russia) CSKA Moscow
19	MF	Niko Kranjčar	13 August 1984 (aged 21)	21	(Croatia) Hajduk Split
20	DF	Anthony Šerić	15 January 1979 (aged 27)	14	(Greece) Panathinaikos
21	FW	Boško Balaban	15 October 1978 (aged 27)	27	(Belgium) Club Brugge
22	FW	Ivan Bošnjak	6 February 1979 (aged 27)	13	(Croatia) Dinamo Zagreb
23	GK	Tomislav Butina	30 March 1974 (aged 32)	28	(Belgium) Club Brugge

=== Japan ===
Head coach: (Brazil) Zico

No.	Pos.	Player	Date of birth (age)	Caps	Club
1	GK	Seigo Narazaki	15 April 1976 (aged 30)	50	(Japan) Nagoya Grampus Eight
2	DF	Teruyuki Moniwa	8 September 1981 (aged 24)	8	(Japan) FC Tokyo
3	DF	Yūichi Komano	25 July 1981 (aged 24)	8	(Japan) Sanfrecce Hiroshima
4	MF	Yasuhito Endō	28 January 1980 (aged 26)	40	(Japan) Gamba Osaka
5	DF	Tsuneyasu Miyamoto (c)	7 February 1977 (aged 29)	69	(Japan) Gamba Osaka
6	DF	Kōji Nakata	9 July 1979 (aged 26)	55	(Switzerland) Basel
7	MF	Hidetoshi Nakata	22 January 1977 (aged 29)	74	(Italy) Fiorentina
8	MF	Mitsuo Ogasawara	5 April 1979 (aged 27)	51	(Japan) Kashima Antlers
9	FW	Naohiro Takahara	4 June 1979 (aged 27)	41	(Germany) Hamburger SV
10	MF	Shunsuke Nakamura	24 June 1978 (aged 27)	60	(Scotland) Celtic
11	FW	Seiichiro Maki	7 August 1980 (aged 25)	10	(Japan) JEF United
12	GK	Yoichi Doi	25 July 1973 (aged 32)	4	(Japan) FC Tokyo
13	FW	Atsushi Yanagisawa	27 May 1977 (aged 29)	56	(Japan) Kashima Antlers
14	DF	Alessandro Santos	20 July 1977 (aged 28)	72	(Japan) Urawa Red Diamonds
15	MF	Takashi Fukunishi	1 September 1976 (aged 29)	62	(Japan) Júbilo Iwata
16	FW	Masashi Oguro	4 May 1980 (aged 26)	18	(France) Grenoble
17	MF	Junichi Inamoto	18 September 1979 (aged 26)	63	(England) West Bromwich Albion
18	MF	Shinji Ono	27 September 1979 (aged 26)	54	(Japan) Urawa Red Diamonds
19	DF	Keisuke Tsuboi	16 September 1979 (aged 26)	33	(Japan) Urawa Red Diamonds
20	FW	Keiji Tamada	11 April 1980 (aged 26)	39	(Japan) Nagoya Grampus Eight
21	DF	Akira Kaji	13 January 1980 (aged 26)	43	(Japan) Gamba Osaka
22	DF	Yuji Nakazawa	25 February 1978 (aged 28)	50	(Japan) Yokohama F. Marinos
23	GK	Yoshikatsu Kawaguchi	15 August 1975 (aged 30)	89	(Japan) Júbilo Iwata

== Group G ==
=== France ===
Head coach: Raymond Domenech

No.	Pos.	Player	Date of birth (age)	Caps	Club
1	GK	Mickaël Landreau	14 May 1979 (aged 27)	3	(France) Nantes
2	DF	Jean-Alain Boumsong	14 December 1979 (aged 26)	19	(England) Newcastle United
3	DF	Eric Abidal	11 September 1979 (aged 26)	8	(France) Lyon
4	MF	Patrick Vieira	23 June 1976 (aged 29)	87	(Italy) Juventus
5	DF	William Gallas	17 August 1977 (aged 28)	40	(England) Chelsea
6	MF	Claude Makélélé	18 February 1973 (aged 33)	43	(England) Chelsea
7	MF	Florent Malouda	13 June 1980 (aged 25)	13	(France) Lyon
8	MF	Vikash Dhorasoo	10 October 1973 (aged 32)	16	(France) Paris Saint-Germain
9	FW	Sidney Govou	27 July 1979 (aged 26)	19	(France) Lyon
10	MF	Zinedine Zidane (c)	23 June 1972 (aged 33)	102	(Spain) Real Madrid
11	FW	Sylvain Wiltord	10 May 1974 (aged 32)	80	(France) Lyon
12	FW	Thierry Henry	17 August 1977 (aged 28)	78	(England) Arsenal
13	DF	Mikaël Silvestre	9 August 1977 (aged 28)	39	(England) Manchester United
14	FW	Louis Saha	8 August 1978 (aged 27)	9	(England) Manchester United
15	DF	Lilian Thuram	1 January 1972 (aged 34)	114	(Italy) Juventus
16	GK	Fabien Barthez	28 June 1971 (aged 34)	80	(France) Marseille
17	DF	Gaël Givet	9 October 1981 (aged 24)	11	(France) Monaco
18	MF	Alou Diarra	15 July 1981 (aged 24)	9	(France) Lens
19	DF	Willy Sagnol	18 March 1977 (aged 29)	38	(Germany) Bayern Munich
20	FW	David Trezeguet	15 October 1977 (aged 28)	63	(Italy) Juventus
21	DF	Pascal Chimbonda	21 February 1979 (aged 27)	1	(England) Wigan Athletic
22	MF	Franck Ribéry	7 April 1983 (aged 23)	3	(France) Marseille
23	GK	Grégory Coupet	31 December 1972 (aged 33)	18	(France) Lyon

=== South Korea ===
Head coach: (Netherlands) Dick Advocaat

No.	Pos.	Player	Date of birth (age)	Caps	Club
1	GK	Lee Woon-jae (c)	26 April 1973 (aged 33)	97	(South Korea) Suwon Samsung Bluewings
2	DF	Kim Young-chul	30 June 1976 (aged 29)	12	(South Korea) Seongnam Ilhwa Chunma
3	DF	Kim Dong-jin	29 January 1982 (aged 24)	34	(South Korea) FC Seoul
4	DF	Choi Jin-cheul	26 March 1971 (aged 35)	62	(South Korea) Jeonbuk Hyundai Motors
5	MF	Kim Nam-il	14 March 1977 (aged 29)	66	(South Korea) Suwon Samsung Bluewings
6	DF	Kim Jin-kyu	16 February 1985 (aged 21)	23	(Japan) Júbilo Iwata
7	MF	Park Ji-sung	30 March 1981 (aged 25)	60	(England) Manchester United
8	MF	Kim Do-heon	14 July 1982 (aged 23)	75	(South Korea) Seongnam Ilhwa Chunma
9	FW	Ahn Jung-hwan	27 January 1976 (aged 30)	61	(Germany) MSV Duisburg
10	FW	Park Chu-young	10 July 1985 (aged 20)	18	(South Korea) FC Seoul
11	FW	Seol Ki-hyeon	8 January 1979 (aged 27)	67	(England) Wolverhampton Wanderers
12	DF	Lee Young-pyo	23 April 1977 (aged 29)	85	(England) Tottenham Hotspur
13	MF	Lee Eul-yong	8 September 1975 (aged 30)	47	(Turkey) Trabzonspor
14	FW	Lee Chun-soo	9 July 1981 (aged 24)	62	(South Korea) Ulsan Hyundai Horangi
15	MF	Baek Ji-hoon	28 February 1985 (aged 21)	12	(South Korea) FC Seoul
16	FW	Chung Kyung-ho	22 May 1980 (aged 26)	40	(South Korea) Gwangju Sangmu Phoenix
17	MF	Lee Ho	22 October 1984 (aged 21)	11	(South Korea) Ulsan Hyundai Horangi
18	DF	Kim Sang-sik	17 December 1976 (aged 29)	42	(South Korea) Seongnam Ilhwa Chunma
19	FW	Cho Jae-jin	9 July 1981 (aged 24)	21	(Japan) Shimizu S-Pulse
20	GK	Kim Yong-dae	11 October 1979 (aged 26)	15	(South Korea) Seongnam Ilhwa Chunma
21	GK	Kim Young-kwang	28 June 1983 (aged 22)	6	(South Korea) Jeonnam Dragons
22	DF	Song Chong-gug	20 February 1979 (aged 27)	51	(South Korea) Suwon Samsung Bluewings
23	DF	Cho Won-hee	17 April 1983 (aged 23)	13	(South Korea) Suwon Samsung Bluewings

=== Switzerland ===
Head coach: Köbi Kuhn

No.	Pos.	Player	Date of birth (age)	Caps	Club
1	GK	Pascal Zuberbühler	8 January 1971 (aged 35)	40	(Switzerland) Basel
2	DF	Johan Djourou	18 January 1987 (aged 19)	2	(England) Arsenal
3	DF	Ludovic Magnin	20 April 1979 (aged 27)	30	(Germany) VfB Stuttgart
4	DF	Philippe Senderos	14 February 1985 (aged 21)	12	(England) Arsenal
5	MF	Xavier Margairaz	17 January 1984 (aged 22)	3	(Switzerland) Zürich
6	MF	Johann Vogel (c)	8 March 1977 (aged 29)	85	(Italy) AC Milan
7	MF	Ricardo Cabanas	17 January 1979 (aged 27)	37	(Germany) 1. FC Köln
8	DF	Raphaël Wicky	26 April 1977 (aged 29)	67	(Germany) Hamburger SV
9	FW	Alexander Frei	15 July 1979 (aged 26)	45	(France) Rennes
10	FW	Daniel Gygax	28 August 1981 (aged 24)	22	(France) Lille
11	FW	Marco Streller	18 June 1981 (aged 24)	10	(Germany) 1. FC Köln
12	GK	Diego Benaglio	8 September 1983 (aged 22)	1	(Portugal) Nacional
13	DF	Stéphane Grichting	30 March 1979 (aged 27)	6	(France) Auxerre
14	MF	David Degen	15 February 1983 (aged 23)	3	(Switzerland) Basel
15	MF	Blerim Džemaili	12 April 1986 (aged 20)	3	(Switzerland) Zürich
16	MF	Tranquillo Barnetta	22 May 1985 (aged 21)	13	(Germany) Bayer Leverkusen
17	DF	Christoph Spycher	30 March 1978 (aged 28)	21	(Germany) Eintracht Frankfurt
18	FW	Mauro Lustrinelli	26 February 1976 (aged 30)	5	(Czech Republic) Sparta Prague
19	MF	Valon Behrami	19 April 1985 (aged 21)	6	(Italy) Lazio
20	DF	Patrick Müller	17 December 1976 (aged 29)	64	(France) Lyon
21	GK	Fabio Coltorti	3 December 1980 (aged 25)	2	(Switzerland) Grasshopper
22	MF	Hakan Yakin	22 February 1977 (aged 29)	46	(Switzerland) Young Boys
23	DF	Philipp Degen	15 February 1983 (aged 23)	15	(Germany) Borussia Dortmund

=== Togo ===
Head coach: (Germany) Otto Pfister

No.	Pos.	Player	Date of birth (age)	Caps	Club
1	GK	Ouro-Nimini Tchagnirou	31 December 1977 (aged 28)	9	(Mali) Djoliba
2	DF	Daré Nibombé	16 June 1980 (aged 25)	16	(Belgium) Mons
3	DF	Jean-Paul Abalo (c)	26 June 1975 (aged 30)	65	(Cyprus) APOEL
4	FW	Emmanuel Adebayor	26 February 1984 (aged 22)	29	(England) Arsenal
5	DF	Massamasso Tchangai	8 August 1978 (aged 27)	34	(Italy) Benevento
6	MF	Yao Aziawonou	30 November 1979 (aged 26)	32	(Switzerland) Young Boys
7	FW	Moustapha Salifou	1 June 1983 (aged 23)	34	(France) Brest
8	MF	Kuami Agboh	28 December 1977 (aged 28)	4	(Belgium) Beveren
9	MF	Thomas Dossevi	6 March 1979 (aged 27)	10	(France) Valenciennes
10	MF	Chérif Touré Mamam	13 January 1978 (aged 28)	39	(France) Metz
11	FW	Robert Malm	21 August 1973 (aged 32)	1	(France) Brest
12	DF	Eric Akoto	20 July 1980 (aged 25)	32	(Austria) Admira Wacker
13	DF	Richmond Forson	23 May 1980 (aged 26)	8	(France) Poiré
14	MF	Adékambi Olufadé	7 January 1980 (aged 26)	24	(Qatar) Al-Siliyah
15	MF	Alaixys Romao	18 January 1984 (aged 22)	11	(France) Louhans-Cuiseaux
16	GK	Kossi Agassa	2 July 1978 (aged 27)	49	(France) Metz
17	FW	Mohamed Kader	8 April 1979 (aged 27)	46	(France) Guingamp
18	MF	Yao Junior Sènaya	19 April 1984 (aged 22)	16	(Switzerland) YF Juventus
19	DF	Ludovic Assemoassa	18 September 1980 (aged 25)	5	(Spain) Ciudad de Murcia
20	FW	Affo Erassa	19 February 1983 (aged 23)	6	(France) Moulins
21	MF	Franck Atsou	1 August 1978 (aged 27)	13	(Saudi Arabia) Al Hilal
22	GK	Kodjovi Obilalé	8 October 1984 (aged 21)	0	(Togo) Étoile Filante
23	DF	Assimiou Touré	1 January 1988 (aged 18)	1	(Germany) Bayer Leverkusen

== Group H ==
=== Saudi Arabia ===
Head coach: (Brazil) Marcos Paquetá

No.	Pos.	Player	Date of birth (age)	Caps	Club
1	GK	Mohamed Al-Deayea	2 August 1972 (aged 33)	175	(Saudi Arabia) Al Hilal
2	DF	Ahmed Al-Dokhi	25 October 1976 (aged 29)	68	(Saudi Arabia) Al-Ittihad
3	DF	Redha Tukar	29 November 1975 (aged 30)	37	(Saudi Arabia) Al-Ittihad
4	DF	Hamad Al-Montashari	22 June 1982 (aged 23)	32	(Saudi Arabia) Al-Ittihad
5	DF	Naif Al-Qadi	3 April 1979 (aged 27)	28	(Saudi Arabia) Al-Ahli
6	MF	Omar Al-Ghamdi	11 April 1979 (aged 27)	38	(Saudi Arabia) Al Hilal
7	MF	Mohammed Ameen	29 April 1980 (aged 26)	16	(Saudi Arabia) Al-Ittihad
8	FW	Mohammed Noor	26 February 1978 (aged 28)	63	(Saudi Arabia) Al-Ittihad
9	FW	Sami Al-Jaber (c)	11 December 1972 (aged 33)	160	(Saudi Arabia) Al Hilal
10	MF	Mohammad Al-Shalhoub	8 December 1980 (aged 25)	48	(Saudi Arabia) Al Hilal
11	FW	Saad Al-Harthi	3 February 1984 (aged 22)	15	(Saudi Arabia) Al Nassr
12	DF	Abdulaziz Al-Khathran	31 July 1973 (aged 32)	19	(Saudi Arabia) Al Hilal
13	DF	Hussein Abdulghani	21 January 1977 (aged 29)	97	(Saudi Arabia) Al-Ahli
14	MF	Saud Kariri	8 July 1980 (aged 25)	34	(Saudi Arabia) Al-Ittihad
15	DF	Ahmed Al-Bahri	18 September 1980 (aged 25)	11	(Saudi Arabia) Al Ettifaq
16	MF	Khaled Aziz	14 July 1981 (aged 24)	14	(Saudi Arabia) Al Hilal
17	DF	Mohamed Eid	3 May 1987 (aged 19)	0	(Saudi Arabia) Al-Ahli
18	MF	Nawaf Al-Temyat	28 June 1976 (aged 29)	56	(Saudi Arabia) Al Hilal
19	DF	Mohammad Massad	17 February 1983 (aged 23)	5	(Saudi Arabia) Al-Ahli
20	FW	Yasser Al-Qahtani	10 October 1982 (aged 23)	45	(Saudi Arabia) Al Hilal
21	GK	Mabrouk Zaid	11 February 1979 (aged 27)	33	(Saudi Arabia) Al-Ittihad
22	GK	Mohammad Khouja	15 March 1982 (aged 24)	8	(Saudi Arabia) Al Shabab
23	FW	Malek Mouath	10 August 1981 (aged 24)	5	(Saudi Arabia) Al-Ahli

=== Spain ===
Head coach: Luis Aragonés

No.	Pos.	Player	Date of birth (age)	Caps	Club
1	GK	Iker Casillas	20 May 1981 (aged 25)	58	(Spain) Real Madrid
2	DF	Míchel Salgado	22 October 1975 (aged 30)	50	(Spain) Real Madrid
3	DF	Mariano Pernía	4 May 1977 (aged 29)	1	(Spain) Getafe
4	DF	Carlos Marchena	31 July 1979 (aged 26)	27	(Spain) Valencia
5	DF	Carles Puyol	13 April 1978 (aged 28)	47	(Spain) Barcelona
6	MF	David Albelda	1 September 1977 (aged 28)	33	(Spain) Valencia
7	FW	Raúl (c)	27 June 1977 (aged 28)	95	(Spain) Real Madrid
8	MF	Xavi	25 January 1980 (aged 26)	36	(Spain) Barcelona
9	FW	Fernando Torres	20 March 1984 (aged 22)	30	(Spain) Atlético Madrid
10	MF	José Antonio Reyes	1 September 1983 (aged 22)	19	(England) Arsenal
11	MF	Luis García	24 June 1978 (aged 27)	10	(England) Liverpool
12	DF	Antonio López	13 September 1981 (aged 24)	8	(Spain) Atlético Madrid
13	MF	Andrés Iniesta	11 May 1984 (aged 22)	3	(Spain) Barcelona
14	MF	Xabi Alonso	25 November 1981 (aged 24)	26	(England) Liverpool
15	DF	Sergio Ramos	30 March 1986 (aged 20)	11	(Spain) Real Madrid
16	MF	Marcos Senna	17 July 1976 (aged 29)	3	(Spain) Villarreal
17	MF	Joaquín	21 July 1981 (aged 24)	38	(Spain) Real Betis
18	MF	Cesc Fàbregas	4 May 1987 (aged 19)	4	(England) Arsenal
19	GK	Santiago Cañizares	18 December 1969 (aged 36)	45	(Spain) Valencia
20	DF	Juanito	23 July 1976 (aged 29)	15	(Spain) Real Betis
21	FW	David Villa	3 December 1981 (aged 24)	8	(Spain) Valencia
22	DF	Pablo Ibáñez	3 August 1981 (aged 24)	11	(Spain) Atlético Madrid
23	GK	Pepe Reina	31 August 1982 (aged 23)	3	(England) Liverpool

=== Tunisia ===
Head coach: (France) Roger Lemerre

No.	Pos.	Player	Date of birth (age)	Caps	Club
1	GK	Ali Boumnijel	13 April 1966 (aged 40)	48	(Tunisia) Club Africain
2	MF	Karim Essediri	29 July 1979 (aged 26)	7	(Norway) Rosenborg
3	DF	Karim Haggui	21 January 1984 (aged 22)	26	(France) Strasbourg
4	DF	Alaeddine Yahia	26 September 1981 (aged 24)	13	(France) Saint-Étienne
5	FW	Ziad Jaziri	12 July 1978 (aged 27)	61	(France) Troyes
6	DF	Hatem Trabelsi	25 January 1977 (aged 29)	56	(Netherlands) Ajax
7	FW	Haykel Guemamdia	22 December 1981 (aged 24)	13	(France) Strasbourg
8	MF	Mehdi Nafti	28 November 1978 (aged 27)	29	(England) Birmingham City
9	MF	Yassine Chikhaoui	2 September 1986 (aged 19)	1	(Tunisia) Étoile du Sahel
10	MF	Kaies Ghodhbane	7 January 1976 (aged 30)	89	(Turkey) Konyaspor
11	FW	Francileudo Santos	20 March 1979 (aged 27)	28	(France) Toulouse
12	MF	Jawhar Mnari	8 November 1976 (aged 29)	37	(Germany) 1. FC Nürnberg
13	MF	Riadh Bouazizi (c)	8 April 1973 (aged 33)	85	(Turkey) Kayseri Erciyesspor
14	MF	Adel Chedli	16 September 1976 (aged 29)	38	(Germany) 1. FC Nürnberg
15	DF	Radhi Jaïdi	30 August 1975 (aged 30)	89	(England) Bolton Wanderers
16	GK	Adel Nefzi	16 March 1974 (aged 32)	0	(Tunisia) Monastir
17	FW	Chaouki Ben Saada	1 July 1984 (aged 21)	11	(France) Bastia
18	DF	David Jemmali	13 December 1974 (aged 31)	2	(France) Bordeaux
19	DF	Anis Ayari	16 February 1982 (aged 24)	24	(Turkey) Samsunspor
20	MF	Hamed Namouchi	12 January 1984 (aged 22)	14	(Scotland) Rangers
21	DF	Karim Saidi	24 March 1983 (aged 23)	15	(Netherlands) Feyenoord
22	GK	Hamdi Kasraoui	18 January 1983 (aged 23)	6	(Tunisia) Espérance de Tunis
23	MF	Sofiane Melliti	18 August 1978 (aged 27)	14	(Turkey) Gaziantepspor

=== Ukraine ===
Head coach: Oleg Blokhin

Serhiy Fedorov was injured prior to the start of the tournament. His replacement, Vyacheslav Shevchuk, was also injured shortly after filling in. Oleksandr Yatsenko was then called up, and sat on the bench for the last two matches.

No.	Pos.	Player	Date of birth (age)	Caps	Club
1	GK	Oleksandr Shovkovskyi	2 January 1975 (aged 31)	68	(Ukraine) Dynamo Kyiv
2	DF	Andriy Nesmachniy	28 February 1979 (aged 27)	49	(Ukraine) Dynamo Kyiv
3	DF	Oleksandr Yatsenko	24 February 1985 (aged 21)	1	(Ukraine) Kharkiv
4	MF	Anatoliy Tymoshchuk	30 March 1979 (aged 27)	55	(Ukraine) Shakhtar Donetsk
5	DF	Volodymyr Yezerskiy	15 November 1976 (aged 29)	24	(Ukraine) Dnipro Dnipropetrovsk
6	DF	Andriy Rusol	16 January 1983 (aged 23)	23	(Ukraine) Dnipro Dnipropetrovsk
7	FW	Andriy Shevchenko (c)	29 September 1976 (aged 29)	64	(Italy) AC Milan
8	DF	Oleh Shelayev	5 November 1976 (aged 29)	19	(Ukraine) Dnipro Dnipropetrovsk
9	DF	Oleh Husyev	25 April 1983 (aged 23)	25	(Ukraine) Dynamo Kyiv
10	FW	Andriy Voronin	21 July 1979 (aged 26)	32	(Germany) Bayer Leverkusen
11	FW	Serhii Rebrov	3 June 1974 (aged 32)	70	(Ukraine) Dynamo Kyiv
12	GK	Andriy Pyatov	28 June 1984 (aged 21)	1	(Ukraine) Vorskla Poltava
13	DF	Dmytro Chyhrynskyi	7 November 1986 (aged 19)	0	(Ukraine) Shakhtar Donetsk
14	MF	Andriy Husin	11 December 1972 (aged 33)	64	(Russia) Krylya Sovetov Samara
15	FW	Artem Milevskyi	12 January 1985 (aged 21)	0	(Ukraine) Dynamo Kyiv
16	FW	Andriy Vorobey	29 November 1978 (aged 27)	53	(Ukraine) Shakhtar Donetsk
17	DF	Vladyslav Vashchuk	2 January 1975 (aged 31)	58	(Ukraine) Dynamo Kyiv
18	MF	Serhiy Nazarenko	16 February 1980 (aged 26)	15	(Ukraine) Dnipro Dnipropetrovsk
19	MF	Maksym Kalynychenko	26 January 1979 (aged 27)	21	(Russia) Spartak Moscow
20	FW	Oleksiy Byelik	15 February 1981 (aged 25)	15	(Ukraine) Shakhtar Donetsk
21	MF	Ruslan Rotan	29 October 1981 (aged 24)	19	(Ukraine) Dynamo Kyiv
22	DF	Vyacheslav Sviderskyi	1 January 1979 (aged 27)	6	(Ukraine) Shakhtar Donetsk
23	GK	Bohdan Shust	4 March 1986 (aged 20)	2	(Ukraine) Shakhtar Donetsk

== Age ==
=== Players ===
- Oldest: (Tunisia) Ali Boumnijel (40 years, 56 days)
- Youngest: (England) Theo Walcott (17 years, 85 days)

=== Goalkeeper ===
- Oldest: (Tunisia) Ali Boumnijel (40 years, 56 days)
- Youngest: (Argentina) Oscar Ustari (19 years, 341 days)

=== Captains ===
- Oldest: (Iran) Ali Daei (37 years, 80 days)
- Youngest: (Ghana) Stephen Appiah (25 years, 167 days)

== Player representation by league ==
Country	Players	Percent	Outside national squad
Total	736	100.00%	
England	102	13.86%	81
Germany	74	10.05%	54
Italy	60	8.15%	37
France	58	7.89%	45
Spain	52	7.07%	35
Ukraine	25	3.40%	8
Netherlands	25	3.40%	11
Saudi Arabia	24	3.26%	1
Mexico	23	3.125%	4
Portugal	20	2.72%	12
Costa Rica	20	2.72%	0
Others	253	34.38%	

The squads for Italy and Saudi Arabia were made up entirely of players from their respective domestic leagues, with the latter being the only team without players from European clubs. The Ivory Coast squad was made up entirely of players employed by foreign clubs, and 22 out of the 23 players were registered in Europe. Although Turkey, Scotland, and Russia failed to qualify for the finals, their domestic leagues were represented by 12, 11, and 10 players respectively. In total, domestic leagues from 48 countries had players at the 2006 World Cup.

== Player representation by club ==
Finalised clubs' listing as per FIFA, excluding players on standby and loans.

Players	Clubs
15	(England) Arsenal
14	(England) Chelsea
13	(Italy) Juventus, (Italy) AC Milan
12	(England) Manchester United
11	(Spain) Barcelona, (Germany) Bayern Munich, (Ukraine) Shakhtar Donetsk
10	(France) Lyon, (Spain) Real Madrid
9	(Saudi Arabia) Al Hilal, (Netherlands) Ajax, (Germany) Bayer Leverkusen, (Ukraine) Dynamo Kyiv, (England) Liverpool, (Spain) Valencia
8	(Germany) Borussia Dortmund, (Germany) Hamburger SV, (Italy) Inter Milan, (Netherlands) PSV Eindhoven, (Costa Rica) Saprissa
7	(Saudi Arabia) Al-Ittihad, (Ecuador) LDU Quito
6	(Spain) Atlético Madrid, (Switzerland) Basel, (Portugal) Benfica, (Mexico) Guadalajara, (Germany) Werder Bremen, (England) Tottenham Hotspur
5	(Costa Rica) Alajuelense, (Netherlands) AZ, (Ecuador) El Nacional, (France) Paris Saint-Germain, (Serbia) Red Star Belgrade, (France) Rennes, (Italy) Roma, (Germany) VfB Stuttgart

== Coaches representation by country ==
Nº	Country	Coaches
4	Brazil	Marcos Paquetá (Saudi Arabia), Carlos Alberto Parreira, Luiz Felipe Scolari (Portugal), Zico (Japan)
4	Netherlands	Dick Advocaat (South Korea), Marco van Basten, Leo Beenhakker (Trinidad and Tobago), Guus Hiddink (Australia)
3	France	Raymond Domenech, Roger Lemerre (Tunisia), Henri Michel (Ivory Coast)
2	Argentina	José Pekerman, Ricardo La Volpe (Mexico)
2	Croatia	Branko Ivanković (Iran), Zlatko Kranjčar
2	Germany	Jürgen Klinsmann, Otto Pfister (Togo)
2	Sweden	Sven-Göran Eriksson (England), Lars Lagerbäck
1	Angola	Oliveira Gonçalves
1	Colombia	Luis Fernando Suárez (Ecuador)
1	Costa Rica	Alexandre Guimarães
1	Czech Republic	Karel Brückner
1	Italy	Marcello Lippi
1	Poland	Paweł Janas
1	Serbia	Ratomir Dujković (Ghana)
1	Serbia and Montenegro	Ilija Petković
1	Spain	Luis Aragonés
1	Switzerland	Köbi Kuhn
1	Ukraine	Oleg Blokhin
1	United States	Bruce Arena
1	Uruguay	Aníbal Ruiz (Paraguay)
