= Togo at the FIFA World Cup =

International football delegation

Togo have appeared in the finals of the FIFA World Cup on one occasion in 2006.

== FIFA World Cup record ==
FIFA World Cup record
| Year | Round | Position | Pld | W | D* | L | GF | GA |
|---|---|---|---|---|---|---|---|---|
| (Uruguay) 1930 | Did not enter | | | | | | | |
| (Italy) 1934 | Did not enter | | | | | | | |
| (France) 1938 | Did not enter | | | | | | | |
| (Brazil) 1950 | Did not enter | | | | | | | |
| (Switzerland) 1954 | Did not enter | | | | | | | |
| (Sweden) 1958 | Did not enter | | | | | | | |
| (Chile) 1962 | Did not enter | | | | | | | |
| (England) 1966 | Did not enter | | | | | | | |
| (Mexico) 1970 | Did not enter | | | | | | | |
| (West Germany) 1974 | Did not qualify | | | | | | | |
| (Argentina) 1978 | Did not qualify | | | | | | | |
| (Spain) 1982 | Did not qualify | | | | | | | |
| (Mexico) 1986 | Did not enter | | | | | | | |
| (Italy) 1990 | Did not enter | | | | | | | |
| (United States) 1994 | Did not qualify | | | | | | | |
| (France) 1998 | Did not qualify | | | | | | | |
| (South Korea) (Japan) 2002 | Did not qualify | | | | | | | |
| (Germany) 2006 | Group stage | 30th | 3 | 0 | 0 | 3 | 1 | 6 |
| (South Africa) 2010 | Did not qualify | | | | | | | |
| (Brazil) 2014 | Did not qualify | | | | | | | |
| (Russia) 2018 | Did not qualify | | | | | | | |
| (Qatar) 2022 | Did not qualify | | | | | | | |
| (Canada) (Mexico) (United States) 2026 | Did not qualify | | | | | | | |
| (Morocco) (Portugal) (Spain) 2030 | To be determined | | | | | | | |
| (Saudi Arabia) 2034 | To be determined | | | | | | | |
| Total | Group stage | 1/23 | 3 | 0 | 0 | 3 | 1 | 6 |

== Togo at Germany 2006 ==
=== Squad ===
Head coach: (Germany) Otto Pfister

| No. | Pos. | Player | Date of birth (age) | Caps | Club |
|---|---|---|---|---|---|
| 1 | GK | Ouro-Nimini Tchagnirou | 31 December 1977 (aged 28) | 9 | (Mali) Djoliba |
| 2 | DF | Daré Nibombé | 16 June 1980 (aged 25) | 16 | (Belgium) Mons |
| 3 | DF | Jean-Paul Abalo (c) | 26 June 1975 (aged 30) | 65 | (Cyprus) APOEL |
| 4 | FW | Emmanuel Adebayor | 26 February 1984 (aged 22) | 29 | (England) Arsenal |
| 5 | DF | Massamasso Tchangai | 8 August 1978 (aged 27) | 34 | (Italy) Benevento |
| 6 | MF | Yao Aziawonou | 30 November 1979 (aged 26) | 32 | (Switzerland) Young Boys |
| 7 | FW | Moustapha Salifou | 1 June 1983 (aged 23) | 34 | (France) Brest |
| 8 | MF | Kuami Agboh | 28 December 1977 (aged 28) | 4 | (Belgium) Beveren |
| 9 | MF | Thomas Dossevi | 6 March 1979 (aged 27) | 10 | (France) Valenciennes |
| 10 | MF | Chérif Touré Mamam | 13 January 1978 (aged 28) | 39 | (France) Metz |
| 11 | FW | Robert Malm | 21 August 1973 (aged 32) | 1 | (France) Brest |
| 12 | DF | Eric Akoto | 20 July 1980 (aged 25) | 32 | (Austria) Admira Wacker |
| 13 | DF | Richmond Forson | 23 May 1980 (aged 26) | 8 | (France) Poiré |
| 14 | MF | Adékambi Olufadé | 7 January 1980 (aged 26) | 24 | (Qatar) Al-Siliyah |
| 15 | MF | Alaixys Romao | 18 January 1984 (aged 22) | 11 | (France) Louhans-Cuiseaux |
| 16 | GK | Kossi Agassa | 2 July 1978 (aged 27) | 49 | (France) Metz |
| 17 | FW | Mohamed Kader | 8 April 1979 (aged 27) | 46 | (France) Guingamp |
| 18 | MF | Yao Junior Sènaya | 19 April 1984 (aged 22) | 16 | (Switzerland) YF Juventus |
| 19 | DF | Ludovic Assemoassa | 18 September 1980 (aged 25) | 5 | (Spain) Ciudad de Murcia |
| 20 | FW | Affo Erassa | 19 February 1983 (aged 23) | 6 | (France) Moulins |
| 21 | MF | Franck Atsou | 1 August 1978 (aged 27) | 13 | (Saudi Arabia) Al Hilal |
| 22 | GK | Kodjovi Obilalé | 8 October 1984 (aged 21) | 0 | (Togo) Étoile Filante |
| 23 | DF | Assimiou Touré | 1 January 1988 (aged 18) | 1 | (Germany) Bayer Leverkusen |

=== Group table ===
| Pos | Team | Pld | W | D | L | GF | GA | GD | Pts | Qualification |
|---|---|---|---|---|---|---|---|---|---|---|
| 1 | Switzerland | 3 | 2 | 1 | 0 | 4 | 0 | +4 | 7 | Advance to knockout stage |
| 2 | France | 3 | 1 | 2 | 0 | 3 | 1 | +2 | 5 | Advance to knockout stage |
| 3 | South Korea | 3 | 1 | 1 | 1 | 3 | 4 | −1 | 4 | |
| 4 | Togo | 3 | 0 | 0 | 3 | 1 | 6 | −5 | 0 | |

Source: FIFA
Rules for classification: Tie-breaking criteria

=== South Korea vs Togo ===
Mohamed Kader got the opening goal of the match and Togo's first ever goal at the World Cup Final's in the 31st minute when he controlled a ball over the top and ran into the right of the penalty area before shooting low with his right foot to the left and in off the base of the post past Lee Woon-jae.

13 June 2006
15:00

| South Korea | 2–1 | Togo |
|---|---|---|
| Lee Chun-soo 54'; Ahn Jung-hwan 72' | (Report) | Kader 31' |

FIFA WM Stadion Frankfurt, Frankfurt
Attendance: 48,000
Referee: Graham Poll (England)

| South Korea | Togo |

| GK | 1 | Lee Woon-jae (c) |
| CB | 6 | Kim Jin-Kyu | | (substituted off) 45' |
| CB | 2 | Kim Young-chul | (yellow card) 41' |
| CB | 4 | Choi Jin-cheul |
| RM | 22 | Song Chong-gug |
| CM | 17 | Lee Ho |
| CM | 13 | Lee Eul-yong | | (substituted off) 68' |
| LM | 12 | Lee Young-pyo |
| RF | 14 | Lee Chun-soo | (yellow card) 51' |
| CF | 19 | Cho Jae-jin | | (substituted off) 83' |
| LF | 7 | Park Ji-sung |
Substitutions:
| FW | 9 | Ahn Jung-hwan | | (substituted on) 45' |
| MF | 5 | Kim Nam-il | | (substituted on) 68' |
| MF | 18 | Kim Sang-sik | | (substituted on) 83' |
Manager:
(Netherlands) Dick Advocaat

| GK | 16 | Kossi Agassa |
| RB | 5 | Massamasso Tchangai | (yellow card) 90+2' |
| CB | 3 | Jean-Paul Abalo (c) | (yellow card) 23' (yellow-red card) 53' |
| CB | 2 | Daré Nibombé |
| LB | 19 | Ludovic Assemoassa | | (substituted off) 62' |
| RM | 18 | Yao Junior Sènaya | | (substituted off) 55' |
| CM | 15 | Alaixys Romao | (yellow card) 24' |
| LM | 7 | Moustapha Salifou | | (substituted off) 86' |
| AM | 10 | Mamam Cherif Touré |
| CF | 17 | Mohamed Kader |
| CF | 4 | Emmanuel Adebayor |
Substitutions:
| DF | 23 | Assimiou Touré | | (substituted on) 55' |
| FW | 13 | Richmond Forson | | (substituted on) 62' |
| MF | 6 | Yao Aziawonou | | (substituted on) 86' |
Manager:
(Germany) Otto Pfister

Man of the Match:
(South Korea) Ahn Jung-Hwan

Assistant referees:
Philip Sharp (England)
Glen Turner (England)
Fourth official:
Jerome Damon (South Africa)
Fifth official:
Justice Yeboah (Ghana)

=== Togo vs Switzerland ===
19 June 2006
15:00

| Togo | 0–2 | Switzerland |
|---|---|---|
| | (Report) | Frei 16'; Barnetta 88' |

FIFA WM Stadion Dortmund, Dortmund
Attendance: 65,000
Referee: Carlos Amarilla (Paraguay)

| Togo | Switzerland |

| GK | 16 | Kossi Agassa |
| RB | 5 | Massamasso Tchangai (c) |
| CB | 2 | Daré Nibombé |
| CB | 13 | Richmond Forson |
| LB | 23 | Assimiou Touré |
| DM | 15 | Alaixys Romao | (yellow card) 53' |
| RM | 9 | Thomas Dossevi | | (substituted off) 69' |
| CM | 10 | Mamam Cherif Touré | | (substituted off) 87' |
| LM | 8 | Kuami Agboh | | (substituted off) 25' |
| CF | 4 | Emmanuel Adebayor | (yellow card) 47' |
| CF | 17 | Mohamed Kader |
Substitutions:
| FW | 7 | Moustapha Salifou | (yellow card) 45' | (substituted on) 25' |
| FW | 18 | Yao Junior Senaya | | (substituted on) 69' |
| FW | 11 | Robert Malm | | (substituted on) 87' |
Manager:
(Germany) Otto Pfister

| GK | 1 | Pascal Zuberbühler |
| RB | 23 | Philipp Degen |
| CB | 20 | Patrick Müller |
| CB | 4 | Philippe Senderos |
| LB | 3 | Ludovic Magnin |
| DM | 6 | Johann Vogel (c) | (yellow card) 90+2' |
| RM | 16 | Tranquillo Barnetta |
| LM | 8 | Raphaël Wicky |
| AM | 7 | Ricardo Cabanas | | (substituted off) 77' |
| CF | 9 | Alexander Frei | | (substituted off) 87' |
| CF | 10 | Daniel Gygax | | (substituted off) 46' |
Substitutions:
| MF | 22 | Hakan Yakın | | (substituted on) 46' |
| FW | 11 | Marco Streller | | (substituted on) 77' |
| FW | 18 | Mauro Lustrinelli | | (substituted on) 87' |
Manager:
(Switzerland) Köbi Kuhn

Man of the Match:
(Switzerland) Alexander Frei

Assistant referees:
Amelio Andino (Paraguay)
Manuel Bernal (Paraguay)
Fourth official:
Mohamed Guezzaz (Morocco)
Fifth official:
Brahim Djezzar (Algeria)

=== Togo vs France ===
23 June 2006
21:00

| Togo | 0–2 | France |
|---|---|---|
| | (Report) | Vieira 55'; Henry 61' |

FIFA WM Stadion Köln, Cologne
Attendance: 45,000
Referee: Jorge Larrionda (Uruguay)

| Togo | France |

| GK | 16 | Kossi Agassa |
| RB | 5 | Massamasso Tchangai |
| CB | 3 | Jean-Paul Abalo (c) |
| CB | 2 | Daré Nibombé |
| LB | 13 | Richmond Forson |
| DM | 6 | Yao Aziawonou | (yellow card) 38' |
| RM | 18 | Yao Junior Sènaya |
| CM | 7 | Moustapha Salifou | (yellow card) 88' |
| LM | 10 | Mamam Cherif Touré | (yellow card) 44' | (substituted off) 59' |
| CF | 4 | Emmanuel Adebayor | | (substituted off) 75' |
| CF | 17 | Mohamed Kader |
Substitutions:
| MF | 14 | Adékambi Olufadé | | (substituted on) 59' |
| MF | 9 | Thomas Dossevi | | (substituted on) 75' |
Manager:
(Germany) Otto Pfister

| GK | 16 | Fabien Barthez |
| RB | 19 | Willy Sagnol |
| CB | 15 | Lilian Thuram |
| CB | 5 | William Gallas |
| LB | 13 | Mikaël Silvestre |
| DM | 4 | Patrick Vieira (c) | | (substituted off) 81' |
| DM | 6 | Claude Makélélé | (yellow card) 30' |
| RM | 22 | Franck Ribéry | | (substituted off) 77' |
| LM | 7 | Florent Malouda | | (substituted off) 74' |
| CF | 20 | David Trezeguet |
| CF | 12 | Thierry Henry |
Substitutions:
| FW | 11 | Sylvain Wiltord | | (substituted on) 74' |
| FW | 9 | Sidney Govou | | (substituted on) 77' |
| MF | 18 | Alou Diarra | | (substituted on) 81' |
Manager:
(France) Raymond Domenech

Man of the Match:
(France) Patrick Vieira

Assistant referees:
Wálter Rial (Uruguay)
Pablo Fandino (Uruguay)
Fourth official:
Carlos Chandia (Chile)
Fifth official:
Rodrigo González (Chile)

== Record players ==
Nine players have been fielded in all three of Togo's matches at the FIFA World Cup 2006, making them record World Cup players for their country:

| Rank | Player | Matches |
|---|---|---|
| 1 | Emmanuel Adebayor | 3 |
| 1 | Kossi Agassa | 3 |
| 1 | Richmond Forson | 3 |
| 1 | Mohamed Kader | 3 |
| 1 | Daré Nibombé | 3 |
| 1 | Moustapha Salifou | 3 |
| 1 | Junior Sènaya | 3 |
| 1 | Massamasso Tchangai | 3 |
| 1 | Mamam Cherif Touré | 3 |

== Top Goalscorers ==
The only goal for Togo at a FIFA World Cup, so far, was scored by Mohamed Kader in their 1–2 defeat against South Korea in Frankfurt on June 13th 2006.

| Player | Goals | 2006 |
|---|---|---|
| Mohamed Kader | 1 | 1 |
| Total | 1 | 1 |

== See also ==
- African nations at the FIFA World Cup
