= List of international goals scored by Emmanuel Adebayor =

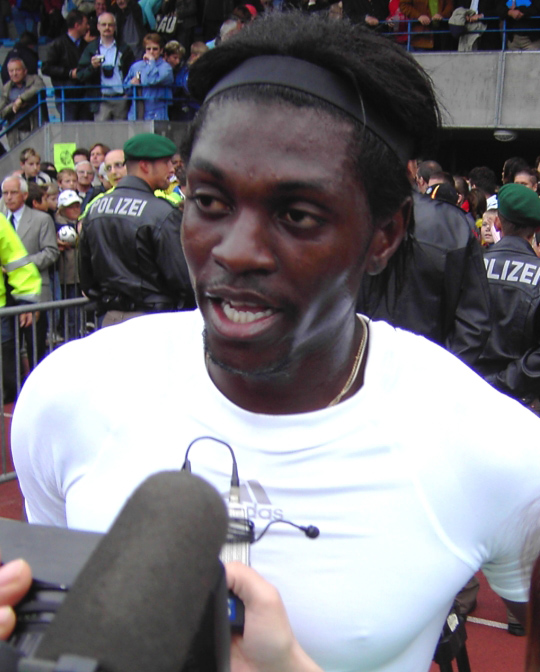
Adebayor scored 32 international goals in 87 FIFA-recognised caps for Togo.

Emmanuel Adebayor is a Togolese former professional footballer who represented the Togo national football team as a striker from 2000 to 2019. A five-time Togolese Footballer of the Year, Adebayor scored 32 international goals in 87 FIFA-recognised appearances, making him the country's all-time top-scorer; he surpassed Kossi Noutsoudje's record of 13 goals on 7 February 2007 against Cameroon. He made his international debut against Zambia on 8 July 2000 in a FIFA World Cup qualification match; he scored his first goal for Togo over two years later against Mauritania in Lomé, Togo.

Adebayor's only international hat-trick came in a 6−0 FIFA World Cup qualification win against Swaziland (Eswatini since 2018) on 11 October 2008; he scored four goals in the match. Adebayor helped Togo qualify for their first FIFA World Cup, the 2006 edition in Germany. He started all three group matches against South Korea, Switzerland and France, but did not score any goals and Togo ended up finishing last in their group. Adebayor scored one goal in the Africa Cup of Nations, seven in Africa Cup of Nations qualification and six in FIFA World Cup qualification. The remainder of his goals, five, have come in friendlies. His most productive calendar year in terms of international goals was 2005, when he scored five goals in ten games for "The Sparrowhawks".

Adebayor scored in his final game for Togo against Benin in March 2019; he later finished his football career aged 39 in 2023. His 22-year long career helped to cement himself as a Togolese legend, as he has been recognised as one of the greatest African footballers of his generation.

== Goals ==
Scores and results list Togo's goal tally first, score column indicates score after each Adebayor goal.

Table key
Indicates Togo won the match
Indicates the match ended in a draw
Indicates Togo lost the match

List of international goals scored by Emmanuel Adebayor
No.	Date	Venue	Opponent	Score	Result	Competition	Ref.
1	12 October 2002	Stade de Kégué, Lomé, Togo	Mauritania	1–0	1–0	2004 African Cup of Nations qualification	
2	8 June 2003	Stade de Kégué, Lomé, Togo	Cape Verde	5–2	5–2	2004 African Cup of Nations qualification	
3	16 November 2003	Stade de Kégué, Lomé, Togo	Equatorial Guinea	1–0	2–0	2006 FIFA World Cup qualification	
4	20 June 2004	Stade de Kégué, Lomé, Togo	Senegal	1–0	3–1	2006 FIFA World Cup qualification	
5	5 September 2004	Stade de Kégué, Lomé, Togo	Congo	1–0	2–0	2006 FIFA World Cup qualification	
6	5 September 2004	Stade de Kégué, Lomé, Togo	Congo	2–0	2–0	2006 FIFA World Cup qualification	
7	10 October 2004	Stade de Kégué, Lomé, Togo	Mali	1–0	1–0	2006 FIFA World Cup qualification	
8	5 June 2005	Stade de Kégué, Lomé, Togo	Zambia	1–0	4–1	2006 FIFA World Cup qualification	
9	5 June 2005	Stade de Kégué, Lomé, Togo	Zambia	4–1	4–1	2006 FIFA World Cup qualification	
10	18 June 2005	Stade Léopold Sédar Senghor, Dakar, Senegal	Senegal	2–2	2–2	2006 FIFA World Cup qualification	
11	4 September 2005	Stade de Kégué, Lomé, Togo	Liberia	1–0	3–0	2006 FIFA World Cup qualification	
12	4 September 2005	Stade de Kégué, Lomé, Togo	Liberia	3–0	3–0	2006 FIFA World Cup qualification	
13	8 October 2005	Stade Alphonse Massemba-Débat, Brazzaville, Congo Republic	Congo	1–1	3–2	2006 FIFA World Cup qualification	
14	7 February 2007	Stade de Kégué, Lomé, Togo	Cameroon	2–0	2–2	Friendly	
15	24 March 2007	Stade de Kégué, Lomé, Togo	Sierra Leone	1–0	3–1	2008 Africa Cup of Nations qualification	
16	24 March 2007	Stade de Kégué, Lomé, Togo	Sierra Leone	3–1	3–1	2008 Africa Cup of Nations qualification	
17	21 November 2007	Ohene Djan Stadium, Accra, Ghana	United Arab Emirates	5–0	5–0	Friendly	
18	20 August 2008	Stade du Vieux Pré, Dreux, France	DR Congo	1–0	1–2	Friendly	
19	11 October 2008	Ohene Djan Stadium, Accra, Ghana	Swaziland	2–0	6–0	2010 FIFA World Cup qualification	
20	11 October 2008	Ohene Djan Stadium, Accra, Ghana	Swaziland	4–0	6–0	2010 FIFA World Cup qualification	
21	11 October 2008	Ohene Djan Stadium, Accra, Ghana	Swaziland	5–0	6–0	2010 FIFA World Cup qualification	
22	11 October 2008	Ohene Djan Stadium, Accra, Ghana	Swaziland	6–0	6–0	2010 FIFA World Cup qualification	
23	28 March 2009	Ohene Djan Stadium, Accra, Ghana	Cameroon	1–0	1–0	2010 FIFA World Cup qualification	
24	8 September 2012	Stade d'Angondjé, Libreville, Gabon	Gabon	1–1	1–1	2013 Africa Cup of Nations qualification	
25	14 October 2012	Stade de Kégué, Lomé, Togo	Gabon	2–0	2–1	2013 Africa Cup of Nations qualification	
26	14 November 2012	Stade Mohammed V, Casablanca, Morocco	Morocco	1–0	1–0	Friendly	
27	26 January 2013	Royal Bafokeng Stadium, Phokeng, South Africa	Algeria	1–0	2–0	2013 Africa Cup of Nations	
28	10 September 2014	Stade de Kégué, Lomé, Togo	Ghana	2–2	2–3	2015 Africa Cup of Nations qualification	
29	15 November 2014	Stade de Kégué, Lomé, Togo	Guinea	1–4	1–4	2015 Africa Cup of Nations qualification	
30	14 June 2015	Stade de Kégué, Lomé, Togo	Liberia	2–1	2–1	2017 Africa Cup of Nations qualification	
31	12 November 2017	Stade de Kégué, Lomé, Togo	Mauritius	4–0	6–0	Friendly	
32	24 March 2019	Stade de l'Amitié, Cotonou, Benin	Benin	1–1	1–2	2019 Africa Cup of Nations qualification	

== Statistics ==
Caps and goals by year
Year	Competitive		Friendly		Total	
Year	Caps	Goals	Caps	Goals	Caps	Goals
2000	5 (Note: Four appearances in Africa Cup of Nations qualification, one appearance in FIFA World Cup qualification)	0	0	0	5	0
2001	2 (Note: Appearances in Africa Cup of Nations qualification)	0	0	0	2	0
2002	3 (Note: Two appearances and one goal in Africa Cup of Nations qualification, one appearance in Africa Cup of Nations)	1	0	0	3	1
2003	5 (Note: Three appearances in Africa Cup of Nations qualification, two appearances in FIFA World Cup qualification)	2	0	0	5	2
2004	5 (Note: Appearances in FIFA World Cup qualification)	4	0	0	5	4
2005	5	6	1	0	6	6
2006	6 (Note: Two appearances in Africa Cup of Nations, three appearances in FIFA World Cup, one appearance in Africa Cup of Nations qualification)	0	2	0	8	0
2007	2	2	3	2	5	4
2008	3	4	3	1	6	5
2009	5	1	1	0	6	1
2010	0	0	0	0	0	0
2011	1	0	0	0	1	0
2012	2	2	1 (Note: Does not include the match against Burkina Faso on 14 August 2012. The match is not considered a full A-international match by FIFA, but is by the Togolese Football Federation. He did not score in the match.)	1	3	3
2013	4 (Note: Appearances in Africa Cup of Nations)	1	0	0	4	1
2014	6	2	—		6	2
2015	1	1	0	0	1	1
2016	3	0	5	0	8	0
2017	4 (Note: Three appearances in Africa Cup of Nations, one appearance in Africa Cup of Nations qualification)	0	4	1	8	1
2018	2	0	2	0	4	0
2019	1	1	0	0	1	1
Total	65	27	22	5	87	32

Caps and goals by competition
Competition	Caps	Goals
FIFA World Cup	3	0
Africa Cup of Nations	10	1
FIFA World Cup qualification	24	16
Africa Cup of Nations qualification	28	10
Friendlies	22	5
Total	88	32

Goals by opponent
Opponent	Goals
Swaziland	4
Congo	3
Liberia	3
Cameroon	2
Gabon	2
Senegal	2
Sierra Leone	2
Zambia	2
Algeria	1
Benin	1
Cape Verde	1
DR Congo	1
Equatorial Guinea	1
Ghana	1
Guinea	1
Mali	1
Mauritania	1
Mauritius	1
Morocco	1
United Arab Emirates	1
Total	32

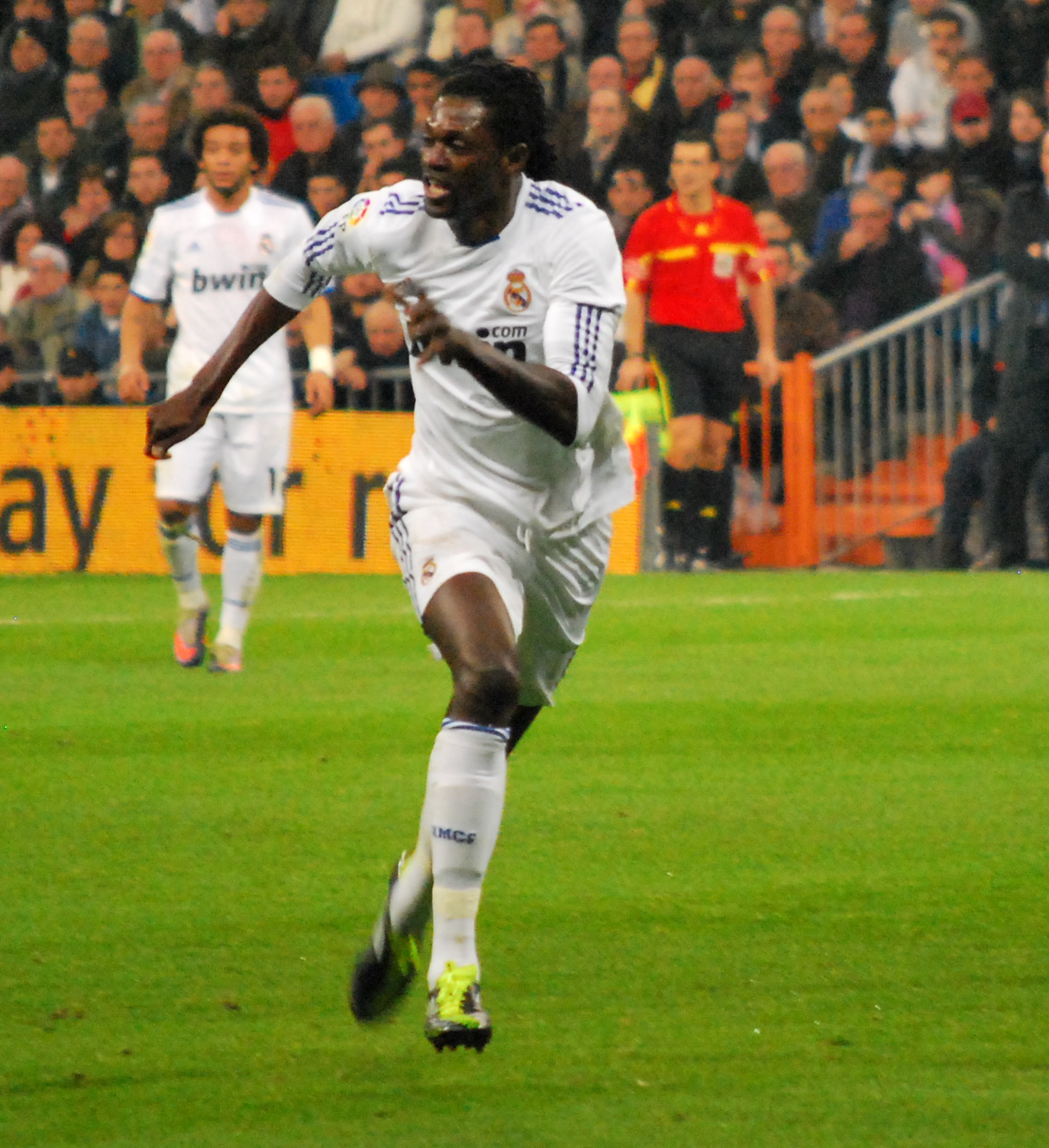
Adebayor's only international hat-trick for Togo came against Swaziland in October 2008, where he scored four goals in the 6−0 win.

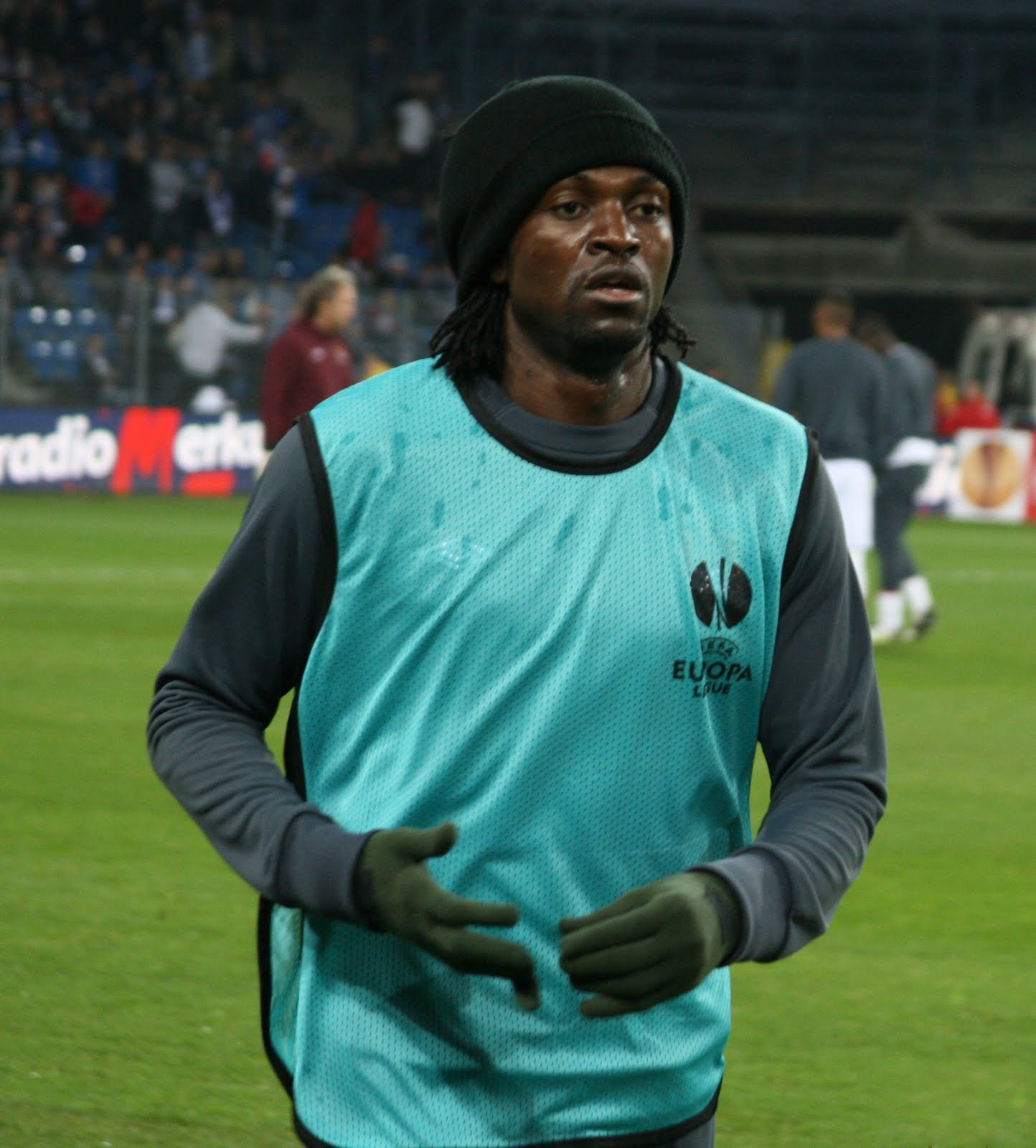
Adebayor won the African Footballer of the Year award in 2008. As of the 2022 edition, he is the only Togolese player to win the award.

== See also ==
- List of top international men's football goal scorers by country
