= Ouro-Nimini Tchagnirou =

Togolese footballer (born 1977)

Personal information
- Full name: Ouro-Nimini Tchagnirou
- Date of birth: 31 December 1977 (age 48)
- Place of birth: Lomé, Togo
- Height: 1.88 m (6 ft 2 in)
- Position: Goalkeeper

Senior career*
Years	Team	Apps	(Gls)
2001–2003	AC Semassi		
2003–2004	Cercle Olympique de Bamako		
2005	Stade Malien		
2006	Djoliba AC		
2007–2010	Stade Malien		

International career^{‡}
2000–2010	Togo	9	(0)
- * Club domestic league appearances and goals as of 23 June 2006 ‡ National team caps and goals as of 23 June 2006

Ouro-Nimini Tchagnirou (born 31 December 1977) is a Togolese former footballer who played as a goalkeeper.

He was a member of the Togo national team, and was called up to the 2006 World Cup.
