= Massamasso Tchangai =

Togolese footballer (1978–2010)

Personal information
- Full name: Komi Massamasso Tchangai
- Date of birth: 8 August 1978
- Place of birth: Ketao, Togo
- Date of death: 8 August 2010 (aged 32)
- Place of death: Lomé, Togo
- Height: 1.83 m (6 ft 0 in)
- Position: Defender

Senior career*
Years	Team	Apps	(Gls)
1995–1996	ASKO Kara		
1996–1998	CA Bizertin	35	(0)
1998–2002	Udinese	0	(0)
1998–1999	→ Gorica (loan)	10	(1)
1999–2001	→ De Graafschap (loan)	28	(1)
2001–2002	→ Viterbese (loan)	16	(0)
2002–2006	Benevento	86	(1)
2006–2008	Al-Nassr	23	(0)
2009	Shenzhen Shangqingyin	29	(0)

International career
1996–2008	Togo	43	(2)
- * Club domestic league appearances and goals

Komi Massamasso Tchangai (8 August 1978 – 8 August 2010) was a Togolese professional footballer who played as a defender. He appeared with the Togo national team in 37 international matches, scoring five times, between 1996 and 2008.

== Club career ==
Tchangai signed to the Italian club Udinese Calcio in 1998 after appearing for Togo at the 1998 African Cup of Nations finals in Burkina Faso. Tchangai was loaned to ND Gorica in Slovenia and later to the Dutch club De Graafschap before moving to Viterbese and Benevento in the Italian lower leagues.

== International career ==
Tchangai was a member of the Togo national team and was called up to the 2006 World Cup. He represented his country at four Africa Cup of Nations (1998, 2000, 2002, 2006). He earned his first national cap for Togo against Congo in August 1996. He won 37 caps and scored five goals for Togo.

== Death ==
Tchangai died on the evening of his 32nd birthday, on 8 August 2010, after a brief illness.

== Career statistics ==
=== International ===
Scores and results list Togo's goal tally first, score column indicates score after each Tchangai goal.

List of international goals scored by Massamasso Tchangai
No.	Date	Venue	Opponent	Score	Result	Competition
1	16 June 1996	Stade Municipal, Ouagadougou, Burkina Faso	DR Congo	1–2	1–2	1998 Africa Cup of Nations
2	27 December 1997	Baba Yara Stadium, Kumasi, Ghana	Cameroon	1–0	1–0	2000 Africa Cup of Nations
