= Assimiou Touré =

Togolese footballer

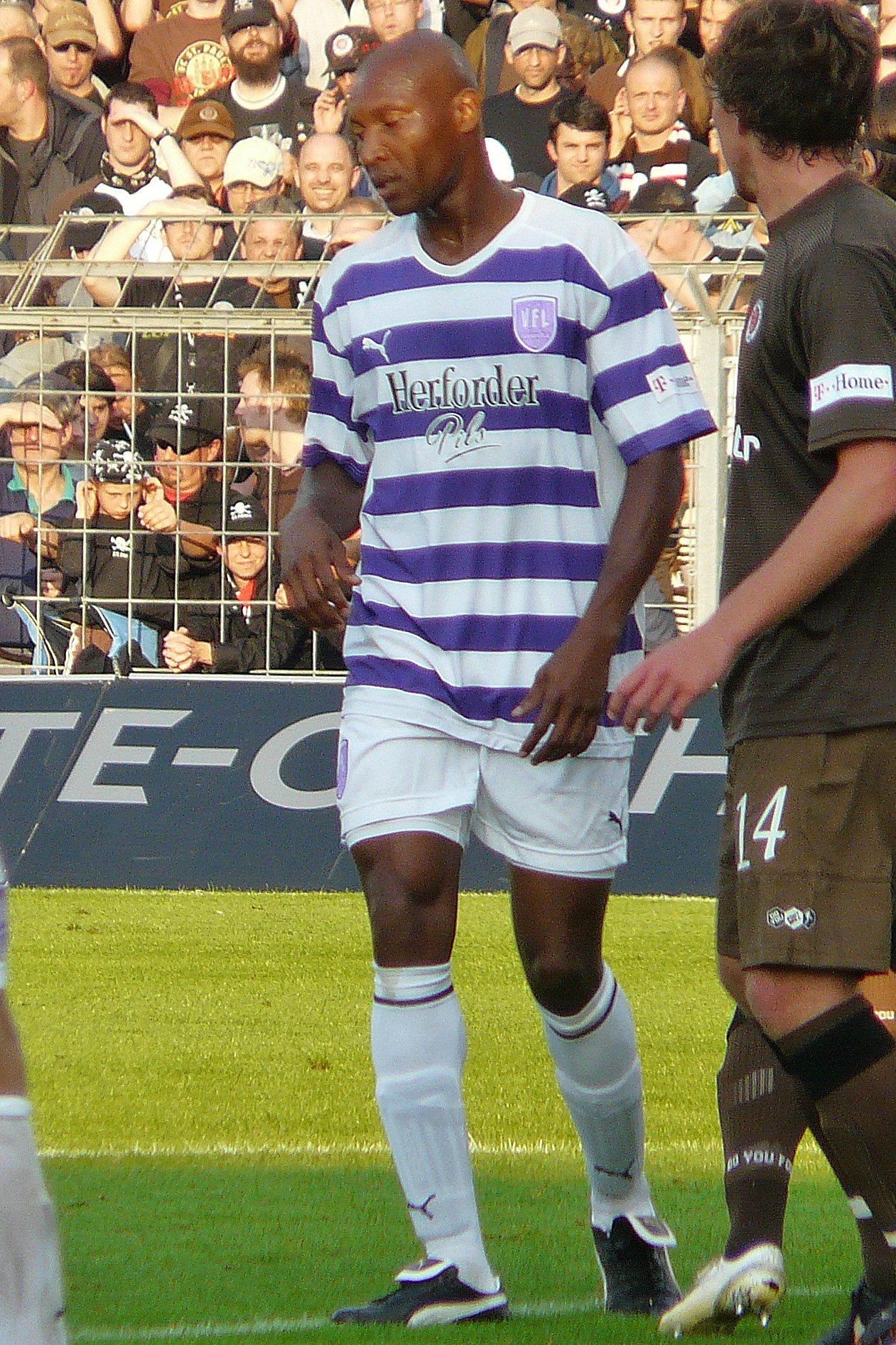

Personal information
- Full name: Assimiou Touré
- Date of birth: 1 January 1988 (age 38)
- Place of birth: Sokodé, Togo
- Height: 1.80 m (5 ft 11 in)
- Position: Defender

Youth career
- 2000–2006: Bayer Leverkusen

Senior career*
Years	Team	Apps	(Gls)
2006–2010	Bayer Leverkusen	2	(0)
2007–2009	→ VfL Osnabrück (loan)	7	(0)
2010–2011	Arminia Bielefeld	11	(0)
2012–2013	SV Babelsberg 03	21	(0)
2013–2015	KFC Uerdingen	36	(0)
2015	Bonner SC	11	(0)
2015–2016	SpVgg Burgbrohl	27	(1)
2019–2022	FC Leverkusen	12	(1)

International career
2006	Germany U18	2	(0)
2006–2011	Togo	19	(0)

Managerial career
- 2016–2017: Viktoria Köln U19 (assistant)
- * Club domestic league appearances and goals

Assimiou Touré (born 1 January 1988) is a Togolese former footballer who played as a defender. He also holds a German passport.

== Career ==
Born in Sokodé, Togo, Touré joined Bayer Leverkusen in 2000 and became a member of their Bundesliga squad at the beginning of the 2006–07 season, making his Bundesliga debut on 22 October 2006 against Hamburger SV. It was his only Bundesliga appearance that season, but he made almost 30 competitive appearances for Bayer Leverkusen's reserve team before going on loan to Osnabrück in August 2007. Three days before his Bundesliga debut, on 19 October 2006, he also made his UEFA Cup debut against Club Brugge.

Touré made five appearances for Osnabrück in the 2nd Bundesliga in September 2007, but sustained an injury in their match against St. Pauli at the end of the month and has been out ever since.

On 1 February 2010, the German second division club Arminia Bielefeld signed him from Bayer Leverkusen. Touré made his debut for the club against MSV Duisburg, although he only played the first half of the match. He left Bielefeld in 2011, and spent a year without a club before joining SV Babelsberg 03. After Babelsberg were relegated from the 3. Liga in 2013, he moved to KFC Uerdingen.

== International career ==
He played for the German under-18 national team twice after receiving German passport in early 2006, but decided to play for his native Togo at senior level and was added to their squad for the 2006 FIFA World Cup finals in Germany, where he appeared in two of the team's three group matches. Touré was member of the 2010 African Cup of Nations squad, but after the attack on the team Togo withdrew from the tournament.
