= Ludovic Assemoassa =

Togolese footballer (1980–2025)

Personal information
- Full name: Amevou-Ludovic Assemoassa
- Date of birth: 18 September 1980
- Place of birth: Lyon, France
- Date of death: 9 December 2025 (aged 45)
- Height: 1.84 m (6 ft 0 in)
- Position: Left-back

Youth career
- Lyon

Senior career*
Years	Team	Apps	(Gls)
1999–2001	Lyon B	21	(0)
2001–2005	Clermont	133	(0)
2005–2007	Ciudad de Murcia	6	(0)
2007–2008	Granada 74	28	(0)
2010	Limonest Saint-Didier		

International career
2005–2008	Togo	6	(0)

Managerial career
- 2012–2023: Lyon-La Duchère B
- 2023–2024: Lyon-La Duchère
- * Club domestic league appearances and goals

Amevou-Ludovic Assemoassa (18 September 1980 – 9 December 2025) was a Togolese professional football player and coach. A Lyon youth product and a left-back, he played for Clermont in Ligue 2. He went on to play for Ciudad de Murcia and Granada 74 in the Segunda División. In 2012, following a stint with Limonest Saint-Didier, he retired from playing. He made six appearances for the Togo national team.

== Playing career ==
Assemoassa graduated from local side Lyon's youth system. With the club's reserve side, he twice won the reserve championship, in 1998 and 2001. He joined Spanish Segunda División side Ciudad de Murcia and switched to Granada 74 when it purchased Murcia's license in 2007.

Assemoassa was a member of the Togo national team and was called up to the 2006 World Cup. He made two appearances for Togo at the 2006 Africa Cup of Nations finals in Egypt.

== Coaching career ==
After his retirement from playing, Assemoassa turned to coaching. In 2023 he became part of a coaching trio with Karim Bounouara and Habib Sisbane at Lyon-La Duchère. He helped the club reach the round of 32 in the Coupe de France, beating three clubs from higher divisions along the way.

== Death ==
Assemoassa died on 9 December 2025, at the age of 45, after eight years of illness.
