= Richmond Forson =

Footballer (born 1980)

Personal information
- Date of birth: 23 May 1980 (age 46)
- Place of birth: Aflao, Ghana
- Height: 1.80 m (5 ft 11 in)
- Position: Left-back

Senior career*
Years	Team	Apps	(Gls)
1997–2001	Metz B	25	(1)
2001–2002	Louhans-Cuiseaux	7	(1)
2002–2004	Luçon	60	(0)
2005–2006	Vendée Poiré sur Vie	32	(0)
2006–2008	AS Cherbourg	22	(0)
2008–2010	Thouars Foot 79	45	(0)
2010–2012	Chauvigny		
2012–2013	Yzeure		

International career
2001–2009	Togo	16	(0)
- * Club domestic league appearances and goals

Richmond Forson (born 23 May 1980) is a former professional footballer who played as a left-back and spent his career in France. Born in Ghana, he grew up in Togo and represented the Togo national team internationally.

== Club career ==
Forson was born in Aflao, Ghana. As a youngster who started out with Sporting Club de Lome, moving to France to FC Metz later. His early promise, which saw interest in him by such big clubs as Arsenal, was almost eliminated when in 2001, while only 21, he was the victim of a serious road accident in France which left him unable to play for almost a year. Forson then played as a defender for Luçon and an amateur team Vendée Poiré sur Vie.

Following the 2006 World Cup, from January 2007 – August 2008, Forson played two seasons for AS Cherbourg Football in the French Championnat National. In 2008 after a falling out with the coach having lost his place in the side following a period with injury, he left Cherbourg and moved to Thouars Foot 79. On 30 January 2012, Forson signed for Championnat de France amateur side AS Yzeure along with David Pathinvo and Guinean international Aboubacar Sylla.

== International career ==
Born in Ghana, Forson grew up in Togo and was eligible to play for the Ghana and Togo national teams. While still an amateur player, he became a member of the Togo national team. His national debut came in May 2001 in a 1–0 victory against Senegal. Forson is the second football player originally from Ghana to play for the Togo. The other one is Eric Akoto. His revelation was in a four-country tournament in Iran, comprising the Paraguay, Macedonia, Iran and Togo teams.

Forson was called up to the squad to participate in the 2006 FIFA World Cup where he started in two games against Switzerland and France. Both games resulted in 2–0 losses. At the 2006 FIFA World Cup, Forson was involved in the bonus dispute where the entire Togo threatened to go on strike after the national federation failed to pay the bonus money that was owed to the players. The situation was resolved with a partial payment to the players.
