= Yao Junior Sènaya =

Togolese footballer (born 1984)

Junior Sènaya
Personal information
- Full name: Yao Séyram Junior Sènaya
- Date of birth: 19 April 1984 (age 42)
- Place of birth: Lomé, Togo
- Height: 1.66 m (5 ft 5 1/2 in)
- Positions: Midfielder; striker

Senior career*
Years	Team	Apps	(Gls)
2001–2002	Wangen bei Olten		
2002–2004	Basel B		
2004–2005	Concordia Basel	18	(2)
2005–2006	Young Fellows Juventus	25	(9)
2006	Thun	2	(0)
2006–2007	Young Fellows Juventus	12	(1)
2007–2008	La Chaux-de-Fonds	26	(0)
2008–2009	Al Jazirah Al Hamra	12	(1)
2000–2011	Dibba Al-Hisn	24	(9)

International career
2004–2010	Togo	36	(3)
- * Club domestic league appearances and goals

Yao Séyram Junior Sènaya (born 19 April 1984) is a Togolese former professional footballer who played as a striker or a midfielder. He is the younger brother of Yao Mawuko Sènaya.

== Football career ==
Sènaya spent his entire professional career in Switzerland, playing for many teams, but only Thun in the Swiss Super League.

He was released by La Chaux-de-Fonds in summer 2008 and rounded off his career in the United Arab Emirates.

=== International ===
He was a key part of the Togo national team, having played in both the 2006 African Cup of Nations and the 2006 World Cup in Germany, where he appeared in all three games in which Togo competed.

Yao Junior Sènaya was easily identified on the field due to his more "exotic" haircuts. He wore bleach blonde hair to the African Nations Cup in 2006.
