= Kossi Agassa =

French-Togolese footballer (born 1978)

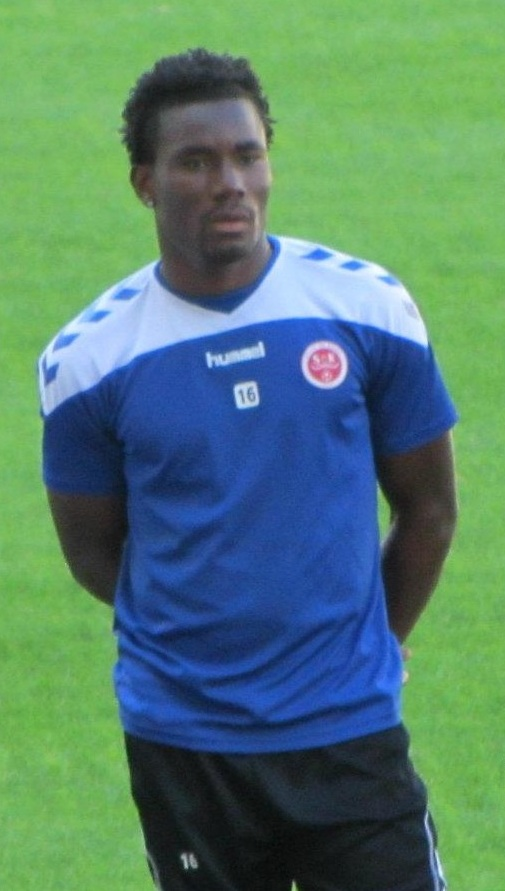

Personal information
- Full name: Kossi Agassa
- Date of birth: 2 July 1978 (age 48)
- Place of birth: Lomé, Togo
- Height: 1.90 m (6 ft 3 in)
- Position: Goalkeeper

Senior career*
Years	Team	Apps	(Gls)
1997–2001	Étoile Filante		
2001–2002	Africa Sports		
2002–2006	Metz	31	(0)
2006–2007	Hércules	8	(0)
2008–2016	Reims	182	(0)
2009–2010	→ Istres (loan)	19	(0)
2016–2017	Granville	0	(0)
Total		240	(0)

International career
1999–2017	Togo	85	(0)
- * Club domestic league appearances and goals

Kossi Agassa (born 2 July 1978) is a French-Togolese former professional footballer who played as a goalkeeper. He spent most of his club career in France. Between 1999 and 2017, he made 74 FIFA-official appearances for the Togo national team.

Having played for the Étoile Filante in Togo and Africa Sports in the Ivory Coast, he moved to French club Metz in 2002 where he stayed until 2006. Following a one-year stint at Spanish club Hércules, he joined Reims in 2008 where he amassed 167 league appearances during an eight-year stay interrupted by a loan to Istres in the 2009–10 season. He ended his career after one season at Granville.

== Club career ==
In July 2016, after eight years with Reims, Agassa was left out of first-team training. On 11 August 2016, he agreed to the termination of his contract.

== International career ==
With over 50 caps for Togo national team, Agassa is one of his country's most experienced players, and was called up to the 2006 FIFA World Cup as the first-choice goalkeeper. He is known as "Magic Hands".

In 2013 he played in all matches at 2013 Africa Cup of Nations when his team reached the quarter-finals.

== Career statistics ==
=== Club ===
Appearances and goals by club, season and competition
Club	Season	League			National cup		League cup		Total	
Club	Season	Division	Apps	Goals	Apps	Goals	Apps	Goals	Apps	Goals
Metz	2002–03	Ligue 2	18	0	0	0	1	0	19	0
Metz	2003–04	Ligue 1	11	0	0	0	0	0	11	0
Metz	2004–05	Ligue 1	1	0	0	0	0	0	1	0
Metz	2005–06	Ligue 1	1	0	0	0	1	0	2	0
Metz	Total		31	0	0	0	2	0	33	0
Hércules	2006–07	Segunda División	8	0	2	0	—		10	0
Reims	2007–08	Ligue 2	14	0	—		—		14	0
Reims	2008–09	Ligue 2	15	0	0	0	0	0	15	0
Reims	2010–11	Ligue 2	23	0	6	0	0	0	29	0
Reims	2011–12	Ligue 2	35	0	0	0	0	0	35	0
Reims	2012–13	Ligue 1	33	0	0	0	1	0	34	0
Reims	2013–14	Ligue 1	34	0	0	0	0	0	34	0
Reims	2014–15	Ligue 1	17	0	2	0	1	0	20	0
Reims	2015–16	Ligue 1	11	0	1	0	1	0	13	0
Reims	Total		182	0	9	0	3	0	194	0
Istres (loan)	2009–10	Ligue 2	19	0	0	0	2	0	21	0
Career total			240	0	11	0	7	0	258	0

=== International ===
Appearances and goals by national team and year
National team	Year	Apps	Goals
Togo	1998	2	0
Togo	1999	8	0
Togo	2000	12	0
Togo	2001	9	0
Togo	2002	4	0
Togo	2003	4	0
Togo	2004	4	0
Togo	2005	6	0
Togo	2006	10	0
Togo	2007	2	0
Togo	2008	2	0
Togo	2009	3	0
Togo	2010	1	0
Togo	2011	1	0
Togo	2012	1	0
Togo	2013	4	0
Togo	2014	3	0
Togo	2016	7	0
Togo	2017	2	0
Total		85	0
