= Mohamed Kader =

Togolese footballer (born 1979)

Mohamed Kader Touré
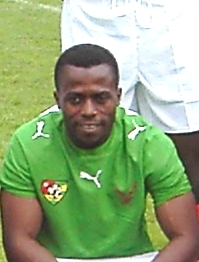
- Kader with Togo in 2006

Personal information
- Full name: Mohamed Abdel-Kader Coubadja-Touré
- Date of birth: 8 April 1979 (age 47)
- Place of birth: Sokodé, Togo
- Height: 1.74 m (5 ft 9 in)
- Position: Forward

Senior career*
| Years | Team | Apps | (Gls) |
| 1995–1997 | Étoile Filante de Lomé | 23 | (27) |
| 1997–1998 | CA Bizertin | 24 | (16) |
| 1998–2002 | Parma | 0 | (0) |
| 1999–2000 | → Lugano (loan) | 8 | (0) |
| 2000–2001 | → Al Ahli Tripoli (loan) | 29 | (17) |
| 2002 | Vicenza | 4 | (0) |
| 2002–2004 | Servette | 73 | (29) |
| 2004–2005 | Sochaux | 20 | (1) |
| 2005–2008 | Guingamp | 38 | (1) |
| 2006–2007 | → Al Jazira (loan) | 9 | (7) |
| 2008–2009 | Al Dhafra | 10 | (13) |
| 2010–2011 | Ajman | 13 | (9) |
| 2012–2014 | Sochaux B | 71 | (18) |
| Total | | 322 | (138) |

International career
| 1995–2009 | Togo | 61 | (13) |
- * Club domestic league appearances and goals

Mohamed Abdel-Kader Coubadja-Touré (born 8 April 1979) is a Togolese former professional footballer who played as a forward.

== Club career ==
After starting with Étoile Filante de Lomé, he left Togo for CA Bizertin (Tunisia) before landing at Parma in Italy in 1998, from where he had loan spells at clubs in Switzerland, Egypt and Italy. In 2003–04 he scored 19 goals in 35 matches for Swiss outfit Servette and was elected best Togolese player abroad. Kader also played for Guingamp in France but left the club in the summer of 2008.

== International career ==
Kader's star rose in his home country after he scored the late winner in the 1998 African Cup of Nations match against Ghana, thus securing the Togo national team's first ever win at the tournament. The forward later played in the 2000 and 2002 editions, as well as featuring in Togo's disappointing campaign in Egypt in 2006.

He helped Togo reach the 2006 World Cup, their first World Cup ever. He further scored the team's first and only World Cup goal in a loss to South Korea.
