= 2006 FIFA World Cup Group B =

Play in Group B of the 2006 FIFA World Cup began on 10 June and completed on 20 June 2006. England won the group, and advanced to the round of 16, along with Sweden. Paraguay and Trinidad and Tobago were eliminated.

== Background ==
Group B was the second of eight groups to start play at the 2006 FIFA World Cup in Germany. The competition consisted of 32 competitors, split into eight groups of four teams. The sides would play each other on a round-robin basis with the top two teams in each group advancing to the round of 16.

== Standings ==
Pos	Team	Pld	W	D	L	GF	GA	GD	Pts	Qualification
1	England	3	2	1	0	5	2	+3	7	Advance to knockout stage
2	Sweden	3	1	2	0	3	2	+1	5	Advance to knockout stage
3	Paraguay	3	1	0	2	2	2	0	3	
4	Trinidad and Tobago	3	0	1	2	0	4	−4	1	

Source: FIFA
Rules for classification: Tie-breaking criteria
- England advanced to play Ecuador (runner-up of Group A) in the round of 16.
- Sweden advanced to play Germany (winner of Group A) in the round of 16.

== Matches ==
All times local (CEST/UTC+2)

=== England vs Paraguay ===
10 June 2006
15:00

England	1–0	Paraguay
Gamarra 4' (o.g.)

Waldstadion, Frankfurt
Attendance: 48,000
Referee: Marco Rodríguez (Mexico)

England	Paraguay

GK	1	Paul Robinson
RB	2	Gary Neville
CB	5	Rio Ferdinand
CB	6	John Terry
LB	3	Ashley Cole
RM	7	David Beckham (c)
CM	4	Steven Gerrard	(yellow card) 19'
CM	8	Frank Lampard
LM	11	Joe Cole		(substituted off) 83'
CF	10	Michael Owen		(substituted off) 56'
CF	21	Peter Crouch	(yellow card) 63'
Substitutions:
MF	20	Stewart Downing		(substituted on) 56'
MF	16	Owen Hargreaves		(substituted on) 83'
Manager:
(Sweden) Sven-Göran Eriksson

GK	1	Justo Villar		(substituted off) 8'
RB	21	Denis Caniza
CB	5	Julio César Cáceres
CB	4	Carlos Gamarra (c)
LB	3	Delio Toledo		(substituted off) 82'
RM	6	Carlos Bonet		(substituted off) 68'
CM	10	Roberto Acuña
CM	13	Carlos Paredes
LM	16	Cristian Riveros
CF	9	Roque Santa Cruz
CF	18	Nelson Valdez	(yellow card) 22'
Substitutions:
GK	22	Aldo Bobadilla		(substituted on) 8'
FW	23	Nelson Cuevas		(substituted on) 68'
DF	2	Jorge Núñez		(substituted on) 82'
Manager:
(Uruguay) Aníbal Ruiz

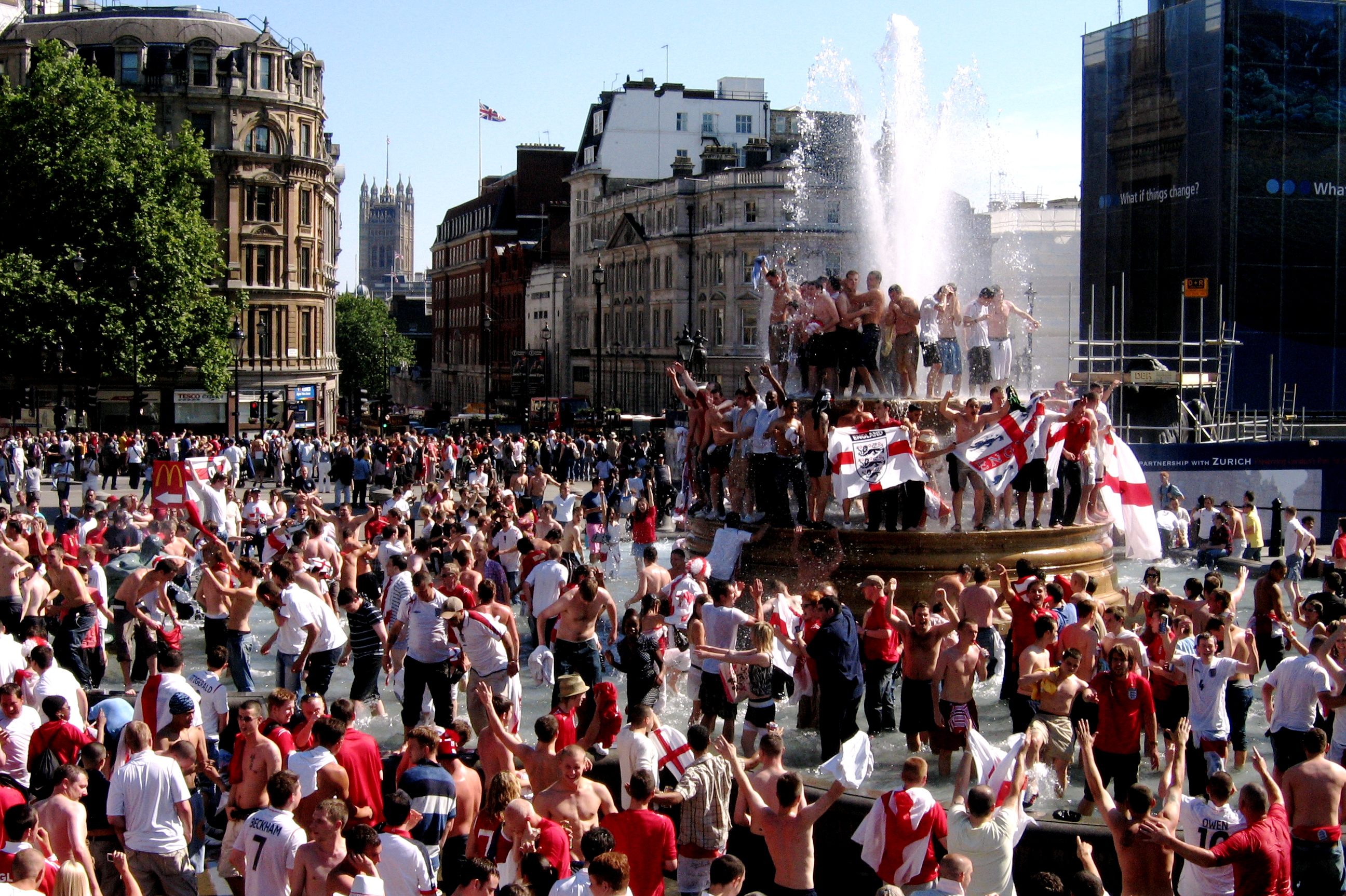
English supporters celebrate their victory over Paraguay

Man of the Match:
Frank Lampard (England)

Assistant referees:
José Luis Camargo (Mexico)
Leonel Leal (Costa Rica)
Fourth official:
Coffi Codjia (Benin)
Fifth official:
Celestin Ntagungira (Rwanda)

=== Trinidad and Tobago vs Sweden ===
10 June 2006
18:00

Trinidad and Tobago	0–0	Sweden

Westfalenstadion, Dortmund
Attendance: 62,959
Referee: Shamsul Maidin (Singapore)

Trinidad and Tobago	Sweden

GK	1	Shaka Hislop
RB	8	Cyd Gray
CB	5	Brent Sancho
CB	6	Dennis Lawrence
LB	3	Avery John	(yellow card) 15' (yellow-red card) 46'
RM	11	Carlos Edwards
CM	7	Chris Birchall
CM	19	Dwight Yorke (c)	(yellow card) 74'
LM	18	Densill Theobald		(substituted off) 66'
CF	14	Stern John
CF	12	Collin Samuel		(substituted off) 52'
Substitutions:
FW	13	Cornell Glen		(substituted on) 52'
MF	9	Aurtis Whitley		(substituted on) 66'
Manager:
(Netherlands) Leo Beenhakker

GK	23	Rami Shaaban
RB	7	Niclas Alexandersson
CB	3	Olof Mellberg (c)
CB	4	Teddy Lučić
LB	5	Erik Edman
RM	21	Christian Wilhelmsson		(substituted off) 78'
CM	6	Tobias Linderoth		(substituted off) 78'
CM	8	Anders Svensson		(substituted off) 62'
LM	9	Freddie Ljungberg
CF	10	Zlatan Ibrahimović
CF	11	Henrik Larsson	(yellow card) 90'
Substitutions:
FW	20	Marcus Allbäck		(substituted on) 62'
FW	18	Mattias Jonson		(substituted on) 78'
MF	16	Kim Källström		(substituted on) 78'
Manager:
Lars Lagerbäck

Man of the Match:
Dwight Yorke (Trinidad and Tobago)

Assistant referees:
Prachya Permpanich (Thailand)
Eisa Gholoum (United Arab Emirates)
Fourth official:
Óscar Ruiz (Colombia)
Fifth official:
Fernando Tamayo (Ecuador)

=== England vs Trinidad and Tobago ===
15 June 2006
18:00

England	2–0	Trinidad and Tobago
Crouch 83'; Gerrard 90+1'

Frankenstadion, Nuremberg
Attendance: 41,000
Referee: Toru Kamikawa (Japan)

England	Trinidad and Tobago

GK	1	Paul Robinson
RB	15	Jamie Carragher		(substituted off) 58'
CB	5	Rio Ferdinand
CB	6	John Terry
LB	3	Ashley Cole
RM	7	David Beckham (c)
CM	4	Steven Gerrard
CM	8	Frank Lampard	(yellow card) 64'
LM	11	Joe Cole		(substituted off) 74'
CF	10	Michael Owen		(substituted off) 58'
CF	21	Peter Crouch
Substitutions:
FW	9	Wayne Rooney		(substituted on) 58'
MF	19	Aaron Lennon		(substituted on) 58'
MF	20	Stewart Downing		(substituted on) 74'
Manager:
(Sweden) Sven-Göran Eriksson

GK	1	Shaka Hislop	(yellow card) 47'
RB	11	Carlos Edwards
CB	5	Brent Sancho
CB	6	Dennis Lawrence
LB	8	Cyd Gray	(yellow card) 55'
RM	7	Chris Birchall
CM	9	Aurtis Whitley	(yellow card) 19'
CM	19	Dwight Yorke (c)
LM	18	Densill Theobald	(yellow card) 18'	(substituted off) 85'
CF	15	Kenwyne Jones	(yellow card) 45+1'	(substituted off) 70'
CF	14	Stern John
Substitutions:
FW	13	Cornell Glen		(substituted on) 70'
FW	16	Evans Wise		(substituted on) 85'
Manager:
(Netherlands) Leo Beenhakker

Man of the Match:
David Beckham (England)

Assistant referees:
Yoshikazu Hiroshima (Japan)
Kim Dae-young (South Korea)
Fourth official:
Kevin Stott (United States)
Fifth official:
Chris Strickland (United States)

=== Sweden vs Paraguay ===
15 June 2006
21:00

Sweden	1–0	Paraguay
Ljungberg 89'

Olympiastadion, Berlin
Attendance: 72,000
Referee: Ľuboš Micheľ (Slovakia)

Sweden	Paraguay

GK	1	Andreas Isaksson
RB	7	Niclas Alexandersson
CB	3	Olof Mellberg (c)
CB	4	Teddy Lučić	(yellow card) 48'
LB	5	Erik Edman
RM	21	Christian Wilhelmsson		(substituted off) 68'
CM	16	Kim Källström		(substituted off) 86'
CM	6	Tobias Linderoth	(yellow card) 14'
LM	9	Freddie Ljungberg
CF	10	Zlatan Ibrahimović		(substituted off) 46'
CF	11	Henrik Larsson
Substitutions:
FW	20	Marcus Allbäck	(yellow card) 60'	(substituted on) 46'
FW	18	Mattias Jonson		(substituted on) 68'
FW	17	Johan Elmander		(substituted on) 86'
Manager:
Lars Lagerbäck

GK	22	Aldo Bobadilla
RB	21	Denis Caniza	(yellow card) 3'
CB	5	Julio César Cáceres
CB	4	Carlos Gamarra (c)
LB	2	Jorge Núñez	(yellow card) 54'
RM	6	Carlos Bonet		(substituted off) 81'
CM	10	Roberto Acuña	(yellow card) 51'
CM	13	Carlos Paredes	(yellow card) 74'
LM	16	Cristian Riveros		(substituted off) 62'
CF	18	Nelson Valdez
CF	9	Roque Santa Cruz		(substituted off) 63'
Substitutions:
MF	19	Julio dos Santos		(substituted on) 62'
FW	20	Dante López		(substituted on) 63'
MF	8	Edgar Barreto	(yellow card) 85'	(substituted on) 81'
Manager:
(Uruguay) Aníbal Ruiz

Man of the Match:
Freddie Ljungberg (Sweden)

Assistant referees:
Roman Slyško (Slovakia)
Martin Balko (Slovakia)
Fourth official:
Jerome Damon (South Africa)
Fifth official:
Enock Molefe (South Africa)

=== Sweden vs England ===
The fixture was a repeat of the two teams' opening match at the 2002 tournament, also ending in a draw.

20 June 2006
21:00

Sweden	2–2	England
Allbäck 51'; Larsson 90'		J. Cole 34'; Gerrard 85'

RheinEnergieStadion, Cologne
Attendance: 45,000
Referee: Massimo Busacca (Switzerland)

Sweden	England

GK	1	Andreas Isaksson
RB	7	Niclas Alexandersson	(yellow card) 83'
CB	3	Olof Mellberg (c)
CB	4	Teddy Lučić
LB	5	Erik Edman
RM	18	Mattias Jonson		(substituted off) 54'
CM	16	Kim Källström
CM	6	Tobias Linderoth		(substituted off) 90+1'
LM	9	Freddie Ljungberg	(yellow card) 87'
CF	20	Marcus Allbäck		(substituted off) 75'
CF	11	Henrik Larsson
Substitutions:
MF	21	Christian Wilhelmsson		(substituted on) 54'
FW	17	Johan Elmander		(substituted on) 75'
MF	19	Daniel Andersson		(substituted on) 90+1'
Manager:
Lars Lagerbäck

GK	1	Paul Robinson
RB	15	Jamie Carragher
CB	5	Rio Ferdinand		(substituted off) 56'
CB	6	John Terry
LB	3	Ashley Cole
RM	7	David Beckham (c)
CM	16	Owen Hargreaves	(yellow card) 76'
CM	8	Frank Lampard
LM	11	Joe Cole
CF	9	Wayne Rooney		(substituted off) 69'
CF	10	Michael Owen		(substituted off) 4'
Substitutions:
FW	21	Peter Crouch		(substituted on) 4'
DF	12	Sol Campbell		(substituted on) 56'
MF	4	Steven Gerrard		(substituted on) 69'
Manager:
(Sweden) Sven-Göran Eriksson

Man of the Match:
Joe Cole (England)

Assistant referees:
Francesco Buragina (Switzerland)
Matthias Arnet (Switzerland)
Fourth official:
Khalil Al Ghamdi (Saudi Arabia)
Fifth official:
Fathi Arabati (Jordan)

=== Paraguay vs Trinidad and Tobago ===
20 June 2006
21:00

Paraguay	2–0	Trinidad and Tobago
Sancho 25' (o.g.); Cuevas 86'

Fritz-Walter-Stadion, Kaiserslautern
Attendance: 46,000
Referee: Roberto Rosetti (Italy)

Paraguay	Trinidad and Tobago

GK	22	Aldo Bobadilla
RB	21	Denis Caniza		(substituted off) 89'
CB	5	Julio César Cáceres		(substituted off) 77'
CB	4	Carlos Gamarra (c)
LB	2	Jorge Núñez
RM	8	Edgar Barreto
CM	10	Roberto Acuña
CM	13	Carlos Paredes	(yellow card) 30'
LM	19	Julio dos Santos	(yellow card) 54'
CF	18	Nelson Valdez		(substituted off) 66'
CF	9	Roque Santa Cruz
Substitutions:
FW	23	Nelson Cuevas		(substituted on) 66'
DF	15	Julio Manzur		(substituted on) 77'
DF	14	Paulo da Silva		(substituted on) 89'
Manager:
(Uruguay) Aníbal Ruiz

GK	21	Kelvin Jack
RB	11	Carlos Edwards
CB	5	Brent Sancho	(yellow card) 45'
CB	6	Dennis Lawrence
LB	3	Avery John		(substituted off) 31'
RM	7	Chris Birchall
CM	9	Aurtis Whitley	(yellow card) 48'	(substituted off) 67'
CM	19	Dwight Yorke (c)
LM	18	Densill Theobald
CF	13	Cornell Glen		(substituted off) 41'
CF	14	Stern John
Substitutions:
FW	15	Kenwyne Jones		(substituted on) 31'
MF	16	Evans Wise		(substituted on) 41'
MF	10	Russell Latapy		(substituted on) 67'
Manager:
(Netherlands) Leo Beenhakker

Man of the Match:
Julio dos Santos (Paraguay)

Assistant referees:
Cristiano Copelli (Italy)
Alessandro Stagnelli (Italy)
Fourth official:
Frank De Bleeckere (Belgium)
Fifth official:
Peter Hermans (Belgium)

== See also ==
- England at the FIFA World Cup
- Paraguay at the FIFA World Cup
- Sweden at the FIFA World Cup
- Trinidad and Tobago at the FIFA World Cup
