= Trinidad and Tobago at the FIFA World Cup =

International football delegation

The FIFA World Cup, sometimes called the Football World Cup but is normally referred to simply as the World Cup, is an international association football competition contested by the men's national teams of the members of Fédération Internationale de Football Association (FIFA), the sport's global governing body. The championship has been awarded every four years since the first tournament in 1930, except in 1942 and 1946, due to World War II.

The tournament consists of two parts, the qualification phase and the final phase (officially called the World Cup Finals). The qualification phase, which currently take place over the three years preceding the Finals, is used to determine which teams qualify for the Finals. The current format of the Finals involves 48 teams competing for the title, at venues within the host nation (or nations) over a period of about a month. The World Cup final is the most widely viewed sporting event in the world, with an estimated 715.1 million people watching the 2006 tournament final.

Trinidad and Tobago have qualified for the final stages of the FIFA World Cup on one occasion, in 2006, when they qualified for the tournament in Germany, but were eliminated at the group stage. Trinidad and Tobago became the smallest nation in terms of population to reach the finals of a World Cup tournament, a feat previously held by Northern Ireland since their first World Cup appearance at the 1958 World Cup. This record was held until Iceland qualified for the first time in 2018.

== World Cup record ==
FIFA World Cup record										Qualification record					
Year	Result	Position	Pld	W	D	L	GF	GA	Squad	Pld	W	D	L	GF	GA
1930 to 1962	Part of United Kingdom									Part of United Kingdom					
(England) 1966	Did not qualify									4	1	0	3	5	12
(Mexico) 1970	Did not qualify									4	1	1	2	4	10
(West Germany) 1974	Did not qualify									9	6	1	2	27	8
(Argentina) 1978	Did not qualify									6	2	2	2	10	9
(Spain) 1982	Did not qualify									4	1	2	1	1	2
(Mexico) 1986	Did not qualify									4	0	1	3	2	7
(Italy) 1990	Did not qualify									12	5	5	2	13	6
(United States) 1994	Did not qualify									4	2	1	1	7	4
(France) 1998	Did not qualify									8	2	1	5	15	10
(South Korea) (Japan) 2002	Did not qualify									22	10	4	8	33	28
(Germany) 2006	Group stage	27th	3	0	1	2	0	4	Squad	20	11	2	7	30	25
(South Africa) 2010	Did not qualify									18	5	5	8	22	30
(Brazil) 2014	Did not qualify									6	4	0	2	12	4
(Russia) 2018	Did not qualify									16	5	2	9	20	28
(Qatar) 2022	Did not qualify									4	2	2	0	6	1
(Canada) (Mexico) (United States) 2026	Did not qualify									10	3	5	2	23	13
(Morocco) (Portugal) (Spain) 2030	To be determined									To be determined					
(Saudi Arabia) 2034	To be determined									To be determined					
Total	Group stage	1/16	3	0	1	2	0	4		151	60	34	57	230	197

FIFA World Cup history
First Match	Trinidad and Tobago 0–0 Sweden (10 June 2006; Dortmund, Germany)
Biggest Win	—
Biggest Defeat	England 2–0 Trinidad and Tobago (15 June 2006; Nuremberg, Germany); Paraguay 2–0 Trinidad and Tobago (20 June 2006; Kaiserslautern, Germany)
Best Result	Group stage (2006)
Worst Result	—

== 2006 FIFA World Cup ==
=== Qualification ===
On 12 October 2005, Trinidad and Tobago secured fourth place in the CONCACAF final qualification round, and therefore participated in a playoff with the fifth place Asian team Bahrain for a chance to enter the 2006 World Cup. After a 1–1 draw in Port of Spain, the team beat Bahrain 1–0, with a Dennis Lawrence header in Manama, to clinch their first ever qualification for the World Cup finals.

=== Squad ===
No.	Pos.	Player	Date of birth (age)	Caps	Club
1	GK	Shaka Hislop	22 February 1969	26	(England) West Ham United
2	DF	Ian Cox	25 March 1971	16	(England) Gillingham
3	DF	Avery John	18 June 1975	58	(United States) New England Revolution
4	DF	Marvin Andrews	22 December 1975	98	(Scotland) Rangers
5	DF	Brent Sancho	13 March 1977	42	(England) Gillingham
6	DF	Dennis Lawrence	1 August 1974	65	(Wales) Wrexham
7	MF	Chris Birchall	5 May 1984	21	(England) Port Vale
8	DF	Cyd Gray	21 November 1976	41	(Trinidad and Tobago) San Juan Jabloteh
9	MF	Aurtis Whitley	1 May 1977	26	(Trinidad and Tobago) San Juan Jabloteh
10	FW	Russell Latapy	2 August 1968	66	(Scotland) Falkirk
11	MF	Carlos Edwards	24 October 1978	53	(England) Luton Town
12	FW	Collin Samuel	27 August 1981	19	(Scotland) Dundee United
13	FW	Cornell Glen	21 October 1980	37	(United States) Los Angeles Galaxy
14	FW	Stern John	30 October 1976	97	(England) Coventry City
15	FW	Kenwyne Jones	5 October 1984	30	(England) Southampton
16	MF	Evans Wise	23 November 1973	17	(Germany) Waldhof Mannheim
17	DF	Atiba Charles	29 September 1977	19	(Trinidad and Tobago) W Connection
18	MF	Densill Theobald	27 June 1982	40	(Scotland) Falkirk
19	FW	Dwight Yorke (c)	3 November 1971	56	(Australia) Sydney FC
20	FW	Jason Scotland	18 February 1979	25	(Scotland) St Johnstone
21	GK	Kelvin Jack	29 April 1976	32	(Scotland) Dundee
22	GK	Clayton Ince	13 July 1972	63	(England) Coventry City
23	MF	Anthony Wolfe	23 December 1983	4	(Trinidad and Tobago) San Juan Jabloteh

Silvio Spann was originally in the squad, but had to drop-out after sustaining a hamstring injury in the run-up to the tournament. He was replaced by Evans Wise. Head coach of Trinidad and Tobago's 2006 World Cup squad was Leo Beenhakker.

=== Finals Matches ===
Trinidad and Tobago were drawn in Group B along with England, Sweden and Paraguay.

In their first match, Trinidad and Tobago held a strong Swedish side to a 0–0 draw, despite having Avery John sent off less than 30 seconds into the second half. Team captain Dwight Yorke won Man of the Match honours.

Trinidad and Tobago lost their second game of the group stage to England 2–0. Late goals from Peter Crouch and Steven Gerrard secured England a place in the second round. Trinidad had hoped for a draw between Paraguay and Sweden for their best chances of getting second place but Sweden defeated Paraguay 1–0.

Trinidad and Tobago lost their third and final game of Group B to Paraguay 2–0. An own goal from Brent Sancho put them behind early in the game, and Paraguay scored a second goal late in the match from Nelson Cuevas.

Trinidad and Tobago finished last in Group B with one point, and were eliminated. They were the only team in the 2006 World Cup not to score a goal.

=== Group B ===
Team	Pld	W	D	L	GF	GA	GD	Pts
England	3	2	1	0	5	2	+3	7
Sweden	3	1	2	0	3	2	+1	5
Paraguay	3	1	0	2	2	2	0	3
Trinidad and Tobago	3	0	1	2	0	4	−4	1

Team #1	Score	Team #2
Trinidad and Tobago	0–0	Sweden
England	2–0	Trinidad and Tobago
Paraguay	2–0	Trinidad and Tobago

==== Trinidad and Tobago vs Sweden ====
10 June 2006
18:00

Trinidad and Tobago	0–0	Sweden
	Report

FIFA WM Stadion Dortmund, Dortmund
Attendance: 62,959
Referee: Shamsul Maidin (Singapore)

Trinidad and Tobago	Sweden

GK	1	Shaka Hislop
RB	8	Cyd Gray
CB	5	Brent Sancho
CB	6	Dennis Lawrence
LB	3	Avery John	(yellow card) 15' (yellow-red card) 46'
RM	11	Carlos Edwards
CM	7	Chris Birchall
CM	19	Dwight Yorke (c)	(yellow card) 74'
LM	18	Densill Theobald		(substituted off) 66'
CF	14	Stern John
CF	12	Collin Samuel		(substituted off) 52'
Substitutions:
FW	13	Cornell Glen		(substituted on) 52'
MF	9	Aurtis Whitley		(substituted on) 66'
Manager:
(Netherlands) Leo Beenhakker

GK	23	Rami Shaaban
RB	7	Niclas Alexandersson
CB	3	Olof Mellberg (c)
CB	4	Teddy Lučić
LB	5	Erik Edman
RM	21	Christian Wilhelmsson		(substituted off) 78'
CM	6	Tobias Linderoth		(substituted off) 78'
CM	8	Anders Svensson		(substituted off) 62'
LM	9	Freddie Ljungberg
CF	10	Zlatan Ibrahimović
CF	11	Henrik Larsson	(yellow card) 90'
Substitutions:
FW	20	Marcus Allbäck		(substituted on) 62'
FW	18	Mattias Jonson		(substituted on) 78'
MF	16	Kim Källström		(substituted on) 78'
Manager:
Lars Lagerbäck

Man of the Match:
Dwight Yorke (Trinidad and Tobago)

Assistant referees:
Prachya Permpanich (Thailand)
Eisa Gholoum (United Arab Emirates)
Fourth official:
Óscar Ruiz (Colombia)
Fifth official:
Fernando Tamayo (Ecuador)

==== England vs Trinidad and Tobago ====
15 June 2006
18:00

England	2–0	Trinidad and Tobago
Crouch 83'; Gerrard 90+1'	Report

FIFA WM Stadion Nürnberg, Nuremberg
Attendance: 41,000
Referee: Toru Kamikawa (Japan)

England	Trinidad and Tobago

GK	1	Paul Robinson
RB	15	Jamie Carragher		(substituted off) 58'
CB	5	Rio Ferdinand
CB	6	John Terry
LB	3	Ashley Cole
RM	7	David Beckham (c)
CM	4	Steven Gerrard
CM	8	Frank Lampard	(yellow card) 64'
LM	11	Joe Cole		(substituted off) 74'
CF	10	Michael Owen		(substituted off) 58'
CF	21	Peter Crouch
Substitutions:
FW	9	Wayne Rooney		(substituted on) 58'
MF	19	Aaron Lennon		(substituted on) 58'
MF	20	Stewart Downing		(substituted on) 74'
Manager:
(Sweden) Sven-Göran Eriksson

GK	1	Shaka Hislop	(yellow card) 47'
RB	11	Carlos Edwards
CB	5	Brent Sancho
CB	6	Dennis Lawrence
LB	8	Cyd Gray	(yellow card) 55'
RM	7	Chris Birchall
CM	9	Aurtis Whitley	(yellow card) 19'
CM	19	Dwight Yorke (c)
LM	18	Densill Theobald	(yellow card) 18'	(substituted off) 85'
CF	15	Kenwyne Jones	(yellow card) 45+1'	(substituted off) 70'
CF	14	Stern John
Substitutions:
FW	13	Cornell Glen		(substituted on) 70'
FW	16	Evans Wise		(substituted on) 85'
Manager:
(Netherlands) Leo Beenhakker

Man of the Match:
David Beckham (England)

Assistant referees:
Yoshikazu Hiroshima (Japan)
Kim Dae-young (South Korea)
Fourth official:
Kevin Stott (United States)
Fifth official:
Chris Strickland (United States)

==== Paraguay vs Trinidad and Tobago ====
20 June 2006
21:00

Paraguay	2–0	Trinidad and Tobago
Sancho 25' (o.g.); Cuevas 86'	Report

Fritz-Walter-Stadion, Kaiserslautern
Attendance: 46,000
Referee: Roberto Rosetti (Italy)

Paraguay	Trinidad and Tobago

GK	22	Aldo Bobadilla
RB	21	Denis Caniza		(substituted off) 89'
CB	5	Julio César Cáceres		(substituted off) 77'
CB	4	Carlos Gamarra (c)
LB	2	Jorge Núñez
RM	8	Edgar Barreto
CM	10	Roberto Acuña
CM	13	Carlos Paredes	(yellow card) 30'
LM	19	Julio dos Santos	(yellow card) 54'
CF	18	Nelson Valdez		(substituted off) 66'
CF	9	Roque Santa Cruz
Substitutions:
FW	23	Nelson Cuevas		(substituted on) 66'
DF	15	Julio Manzur		(substituted on) 77'
DF	14	Paulo da Silva		(substituted on) 89'
Manager:
(Uruguay) Aníbal Ruiz

GK	21	Kelvin Jack
RB	11	Carlos Edwards
CB	5	Brent Sancho	(yellow card) 45'
CB	6	Dennis Lawrence
LB	3	Avery John		(substituted off) 31'
RM	7	Chris Birchall
CM	9	Aurtis Whitley	(yellow card) 48'	(substituted off) 67'
CM	19	Dwight Yorke (c)
LM	18	Densill Theobald
CF	13	Cornell Glen		(substituted off) 41'
CF	14	Stern John
Substitutions:
DF	15	Kenwyne Jones		(substituted on) 31'
MF	16	Evans Wise		(substituted on) 41'
MF	10	Russell Latapy		(substituted on) 67'
Manager:
(Netherlands) Leo Beenhakker

Man of the Match:
Julio dos Santos (Paraguay)

Assistant referees:
Cristiano Copelli (Italy)
Alessandro Stagnelli (Italy)
Fourth official:
Frank De Bleeckere (Belgium)
Fifth official:
Peter Hermans (Belgium)

== Support ==
The Tartan Army, supporters of Scottish football, lent their support to Trinidad and Tobago, partly since they were opponents to England and also due to six of the squad members playing for Scottish clubs.

== Aftermath ==
On their return from Germany, the government awarded Leo Beenhakker and each member of the squad the country's second highest honour, the Chaconia Medal, Gold, plus TT$1,000,000 (one quarter in cash, the rest in unit trusts). As captain, Dwight Yorke was awarded TT$1,250,000, while players who had participated in qualification but not in Germany were awarded TT$250,000. Ten members of the teams' technical staff were also later awarded TT$250,000.

On 6 October 2006, thirteen of the players in the 2006 World Cup squad indicated their intention to retire from international football after friendly matches against St. Vincent and the Grenadines and Panama on 7 October and 11 October, respectively. The players alleged that the Trinidad and Tobago Football Federation had reneged on various contractual commitments to the team. This was upheld by the Trinidadian High Court in March 2011, who ordered that an interim payment of $1.14m should be made.

== Record players ==
Nine players were fielded in all three of Trinidad and Tobago's matches in 2006, making them record World Cup appearance makers for their country.

Rank	Player	Matches
1	Chris Birchall	3
1	Carlos Edwards	3
1	Cornell Glen	3
1	Stern John	3
1	Dennis Lawrence	3
1	Brent Sancho	3
1	Densill Theobald	3
1	Aurtis Whitley	3
1	Dwight Yorke	3

== Records and statistics ==
- Most consecutive failed qualification attempts: 10 - 1966-2002
- Best results: 27th place - 2006
- Fewest goals scored in one tournament: 0 - 2006
- Fewest goals conceded in one tournament: 4 - 2006
- Fewest goals scored by both teams in one tournament: 0 - 0 for Trinidad and Tobago v 4 for opponent - 2006
- Longest losing streak: 2 - 15 June 2006 to present
- Longest winless streak: 3 - 10 June 2006 to present
- Oldest Trinidad and Tobago player: 37 years and 323 days - Russell Latapy - v Paraguay, 20 June 2006
- Youngest Trinidad and Tobago player: 21 years and 239 days - Kenwyne Jones - v England, 15 June 2006
- Oldest Trinidad and Tobago goalkeeper: 37 years and 115 days - Shaka Hislop - v England, 15 June 2006
- Youngest Trinidad and Tobago goalkeeper: 30 years and 52 days - Kelvin Jack - v Paraguay, 20 June 2006
- Most appearance by a captain: 3 - Dwight Yorke - 2006
- Most appearance by a goalkeeper: 2 - Shaka Hislop - 2006
- Most appearances as a substitute: 2 - Cornell Glen - 2006
- Most Man of the Match: 1 - Dwight Yorke - 2006
- Most matches lost: 2 - (11 player)
  - Carlos Edwards - 2006
  - Brent Sancho - 2006
  - Dennis Lawrence - 2006
  - Chris Birchall - 2006
  - Aurtis Whitley - 2006
  - Dwight Yorke - 2006
  - Densill Theobald - 2006
  - Cornell Glen - 2006
  - Stern John - 2006
  - Kenwyne Jones - 2006
  - Evans Wise - 2006
- Biggest win: 0 - None
- Biggest defeat: 2 - (2 times)
  - v England, 15 June 2006
  - v Paraguay, 20 June 2006
- Most goals in a match: 0 - No goals scored
- Most goals conceded in a match: 2 - (2 times)
  - v England, 15 June 2006
  - v Paraguay, 20 June 2006
- Most goals conceded in first half: 1 - v Paraguay, 20 June 2006
- Most goals conceded in second half: 2 - v England, 15 June 2006
- Most goals scored by both teams in a match: 2 - (2 times)
  - 0 for Trinidad and Tobago v 2 for England, 15 June 2006
  - 0 for Trinidad and Tobago v 2 for Paraguay, 20 June 2006
- Most goals scored by both teams in first half: 1 - 0 for Trinidad and Tobago v 1 for Paraguay, 20 June 2006
- Most goals scored by both teams in second half: 2 - 0 for Trinidad and Tobago v 2 for England, 15 June 2006
- Fewest goals scored by both teams in a match: 0 - 0 for Trinidad and Tobago v 0 for Sweden, 10 June 2006
- Most goals scored by a opponent player in a match: 1 - (3 times)
  - Peter Crouch - v England, 15 June 2006
  - Steven Gerrard - v England, 15 June 2006
  - Nelson Cuevas - v Paraguay, 20 June 2006
- Most goals scored by a opponent player in first half: 0 - No opponent player first half goal
- Most goals scored by a opponent player in second half: 1 - (3 times)
  - Peter Crouch - v England, 15 June 2006
  - Steven Gerrard - v England, 15 June 2006
  - Nelson Cuevas - v Paraguay, 20 June 2006
- Most goals scored by a opponent substitutions player in a match: 1 - Nelson Cuevas - v Paraguay, 20 June 2006
- Fastest goal conceded: 25th minute - Brent Sancho - v Paraguay, 20 June 2006 (own goal)
- Latest goal conceded: 90+1st minute - Steven Gerrard - v England, 15 June 2006
- Fastest 2 goals conceded: 8 minute - v England, 15 June 2006
- Trinidad and Tobago own goal scored: 1 - Brent Sancho - v Paraguay, 20 June 2006 (25th minute)
- Longest goalless streak: 3 - 10 June 2006 to present
- Longest goalless streak by minute: 270 minute - 10 June 2006, start the match to present
- Longest clean sheet streak by minute: 172 minute - 10 June 2006, start the match to 15 June 2006, 83rd minute
- Longest goalless streak by both teams by minute: 172 minute - 10 June 2006, start the match to 15 June 2006, 83rd minute
- Most consecutive matches without clean sheets: 2 - 15 June 2006 to present
- Most clean sheet: 1 - Shaka Hislop - 2006
- Most clean sheet by a opponent: 1 - (3 times)
  - Rami Shaaban - v Sweden, 10 June 2006
  - Paul Robinson - v England, 15 June 2006
  - Aldo Bobadilla - v Paraguay, 20 June 2006
- Most saves in a match: 8 - Kelvin Jack - v Paraguay, 20 June 2006
- Most saves by a opponent in a match: 3 - Paul Robinson - v England, 15 June 2006
- Most goals conceded by a goalkeeper in a match: 2 - (2 times)
  - Shaka Hislop - v England, 15 June 2006
  - Kelvin Jack - v Paraguay, 20 June 2006
- Most goals conceded by a goalkeeper in first half: 1 - Kelvin Jack - v Paraguay, 20 June 2006
- Most goals conceded by a goalkeeper in second half: 2 - Shaka Hislop - v England, 15 June 2006
- Trinidad and Tobago player sent off: 1 - Avery John - v Sweden, 10 June 2006 (46th minute)
- Longest streak without a red card: 2 - 15 June 2006 to present
- Longest streak without a red card by a opponent: 3 - 10 June 2006 to present
- Fastest yellow card: 18th minute - Densill Theobald - v England, 15 June 2006
- Latest yellow card: 74th minute - Dwight Yorke - v Sweden, 10 June 2006
- Fastest yellow card by a opponent: 30th minute - Carlos Paredes - v Paraguay, 20 June 2006
- Latest yellow card by a opponent: 90th minute - Henrik Larsson - v Sweden, 10 June 2006
- Most yellow card in a match: 5 - v England, 15 June 2006
- Most yellow card in first half: 3 - v England, 15 June 2006
- Most yellow card in second half: 2 - v England, 15 June 2006
- Most yellow card by a opponent in a match: 2 - v Paraguay, 20 June 2006
- Most yellow card by a opponent in first half: 1 - v Paraguay, 20 June 2006
- Most yellow card by a opponent in second half: 1 - (3 times)
  - v Sweden, 10 June 2006
  - v England, 15 June 2006
  - v Paraguay, 20 June 2006
- Most yellow card by both teams in a match: 6 - 5 for Trinidad and Tobago v 1 for England, 15 June 2006
- Most yellow card by both teams in first half: 3 - 3 for Trinidad and Tobago v 0 for England, 15 June 2006
- Most yellow card by both teams in second half: 3 - (2 times)
  - 2 for Trinidad and Tobago v 1 for Sweden, 10 June 2006
  - 2 for Trinidad and Tobago v 1 for England, 15 June 2006
- Fewest yellow card by both teams in a match: 4 - (2 times)
  - 3 for Trinidad and Tobago v 1 for Sweden, 10 June 2006
  - 2 for Trinidad and Tobago v 2 for Paraguay, 20 June 2006
- Most shots in a match: 9 - v Paraguay, 20 June 2006
- Fewest shots in a match: 6 - v Sweden, 10 June 2006
- Most shots by a opponent in a match: 23 - v England, 15 June 2006
- Fewest shots by a opponent in a match: 16 - v Paraguay, 20 June 2006
- Most shots by both teams in a match: 30 - 7 for Trinidad and Tobago v 23 for England, 15 June 2006
- Fewest shots by both teams in a match: 24 - 9 for Trinidad and Tobago v 15 for Paraguay, 20 June 2006
- Most shots on target in a match: 3 - v England, 15 June 2006
- Fewest shots on target in a match: 2 - (2 times)
  - v Sweden, 10 June 2006
  - v Paraguay, 20 June 2006
- Most shots on target by a opponent in a match: 9 - v Paraguay, 20 June 2006
- Fewest shots on target by a opponent in a match: 6 - v Sweden, 10 June 2006
- Most shots on target by both teams in a match: 11 - (2 times)
  - 3 for Trinidad and Tobago v 8 for England, 15 June 2006
  - 2 for Trinidad and Tobago v 9 for Paraguay, 20 June 2006
- Fewest shots on target by both teams in a match: 8 - 2 for Trinidad and Tobago v 6 for Sweden, 10 June 2006
- Most corners in a match: 3 - v England, 15 June 2006
- Fewest corners in a match: 1 - (2 times)
  - v Sweden, 10 June 2006
  - v Paraguay, 20 June 2006
- Most corners by a opponent in a match: 8 - v Sweden, 10 June 2006
- Fewest corners by a opponent in a match: 7 - (2 times)
  - v England, 15 June 2006
  - v Paraguay, 20 June 2006
- Most corners by both teams in a match: 10 - 3 for Trinidad and Tobago v 7 for England, 15 June 2006
- Fewest corners by both teams in a match: 8 - 1 for Trinidad and Tobago v 7 for Paraguay, 20 June 2006
- Most offside in a match: 3 - v Paraguay, 20 June 2006
- Fewest offside in a match: 1 - v Sweden, 10 June 2006
- Most offside by a opponent in a match: 3 - v Paraguay, 20 June 2006
- Fewest offside by a opponent in a match: 2 - (2 times)
  - v Sweden, 10 June 2006
  - v England, 15 June 2006
- Most offside by both teams in a match: 6 - 3 for Trinidad and Tobago v 3 for Paraguay, 20 June 2006
- Fewest offside by both teams in a match: 3 - 1 for Trinidad and Tobago v 2 for Sweden, 10 June 2006

== See also ==
- North, Central American and Caribbean nations at the FIFA World Cup
- Trinidad and Tobago at the CONCACAF Gold Cup
