= Orders, decorations, and medals of Trinidad and Tobago =

The National Awards of Trinidad and Tobago consist of:

- The Order of the Republic of Trinidad and Tobago - the country's highest award.
- The Trinity Cross - the country's highest award until 2006.
- The Chaconia Medal of the Order of the Trinity - in Gold, Silver or Bronze
- The Hummingbird Medal of the Order of the Trinity - in Gold, Silver and Bronze
- The Public Service Medal of Merit of the Order of the Trinity - in Gold, Silver and Bronze
- The Medal for the Development of Women of the Order of the Trinity - in Gold, Silver and Bronze

Holders of the various awards are allowed to use the postnominal letters O.R.T.T. (Order of the Republic of Trinidad and Tobago), T.C. (Trinity Cross), C.M. (Chaconia Medal), H.B.M. (Hummingbird Medal) or M.O.M. (Medal of Merit).

These awards were introduced following independence in 1962 to replace the Imperial royal honours available to citizens of the British Empire. They were approved in 1967 and first awarded in 1969.

The cabinet accepted the decision made by the national awards designs Selection Committee, which selected the designs submitted by the following persons:

1. Ms Wilhelmina McDowell, who designed the Trinity Cross

2. Mrs A. Jardine, who designed the Chaconia Medal and

3. The designers of Messrs Y. DeLima and Co. Limited, who conceptualised the Hummingbird Medal.

4. Mr Ebenezer Edwards designed the Public Service Medal of Merit

Some of the winners who won medals in past years are listed below:

== 2025 awards ==
=== Order of the Republic of Trinidad and Tobago ===
- Narendra Modi, Prime Minister of India

== 2024 awards ==
=== Hummingbird Medal ===
- Romeo Gunness - Principal of Debe Secondary School (Silver)

== 2016 awards ==
=== Chaconia Medal ===
- Prof. Dave Chadee [posthumous] - Entomologist and Parasitologist, for science (Gold)
- Prof. Andrew Jupiter - Former Permanent Secretary/Chairman of the Board of the Petroleum Company of Trinidad and Tobago and Director of the National Gas Company, for public service (Gold)
- Ramesh Lutchmedial - Former Director General of Civil Aviation, for public service (Gold)
- Grace Angela Talma - Management Consultant, for community service (Gold)
- William McKenzie - Former Minority Leader of the Tobago House of Assembly, for public service (Gold)
- Winston Riley - Civil Engineer, for engineering (Gold)
- Winston Rudder - Retired Permanent Secretary, for public service (Gold)
- Justin Paul - Retired Permanent Secretary, for public service and education (Gold)
- Leston Paul - Musician/arranger/composer, for culture (Silver)

=== Hummingbird Medal ===
- Irwin "Scrunter" Johnson - Calypso (Gold)
- Timothy Watkins ("Baron") - Calypso (Gold)
- Angelo Bissessarsingh - History and education (Gold)
- Cornelius Lewis - activist, for community service (Gold)
- Brenda Le Maitre - Matron/Registered Nurse, for community service (Gold)
- St. Margaret's Boys’ Anglican School Youth Steel Orchestra, for culture (Gold)
- Dr. Waffie Mohammed – Educator, for community service (Gold)
- Jerry Baptiste - Police Sergeant, for community service (Silver)
- Bibi Hallim - Retired Facilitator, for community service (Silver)
- Austin Wilson [posthumous] - Retired sound engineer, for culture) (Silver)
- Deborah De Rosia - Educator/ Community activist, for community service and education (Silver)
- Anstey Lumen Payne (Silver)
- Kenneth Paulsingh - Community activist, for community service (Silver)
- Keith Campbell [posthumous] - Fireman, for gallantry (Bronze)

=== Public Service Medal of Merit ===
- Angella Jack (Gold)
- Jacqueline Wilson (Gold)
- Dr. Rohit Doon - Medical Doctor (Gold)
- Mr. William Wilberforce Daniel - Chartered certified accountant (Gold)
- Dr. Vincent Gerald Moe - Retired Permanent Secretary (Gold)
- Ms. Margaret Wright – Retired Registered Nurse (Gold)
- Iverne Ebenezer Yearwood [posthumous] - Former medical public service social worker (Silver)

=== Medal For The Development Of Women (Gold) ===
- Monica Rosalind Williams - Retired Director, Gender Affairs
- Angela Martin - journalist [posthumous]

== 2015 awards ==
=== Order of the Republic of Trinidad and Tobago ===
- Errol McLeod
- Winston Dookeran

=== Chaconia Medal ===
- Daphne Bartlett - businesswoman (Gold)
- Selby Wilson - Telecommunications Authority chairman and former Finance Minister (Gold)
- Reynold Cooper - retired Head of the Public Service (Gold)
- Victor Mouttet - businessman (Gold)

=== Hummingbird Medal ===
- Dil-e-Nadan (Gold)
- Harrypersad Maharaj - President of the Inter- religious Organisation (IRO), for community service (Gold)
- Nobel Khan - former President of the IRO, for community service (Gold)
- Fred “Composer” Mitchell - calypso (Silver)
- Kelwyn Hutcheon - calypso (Silver)
- Andrew “Lord Superior” Marcano - calypso (Silver)
- Anthony “All Rounder” Hendrickson - calypso (Silver)
- Sharlene Flores - parang singer (Silver)
- Sherman Maynard [posthumous] - Policeman, for loyal service (Bronze)
- Kal-el Alleyne - 4 year old, for bravery
- Fernando Smith - soldier, for bravery
- Edric Hargreaves - Coast Guard, for bravery

== 2014 awards ==
=== Chaconia Medal ===
- Michael Ronald Als – Trade unionist/community activist (Silver) [posthumous]
- Rudolph Charles (Silver) [posthumous]
- Velma Jardine - Educator (Bronze)

=== Hummingbird Medal ===
- John Gillespie – architect (Silver)

== 2013 awards ==
=== Order of the Republic of Trinidad and Tobago ===
- Justice Ivor Archie
- Makandal Daaga

=== Chaconia Medal ===
- Jehue Gordon (Gold)

=== Hummingbird Medal ===
- Ramesh Maharaj (Gold)
- John Jaglal (Silver)

== 2012 awards ==
=== Order of the Republic of Trinidad and Tobago ===
- Keshorn Walcott

=== Chaconia Medal ===
- Therese Mills (Gold)
- Selwyn Ryan (Gold)
- Swami Prakashananda (Gold)

=== Hummingbird Medal ===
- Ade Alleyne-Forte (Gold)
- Keston Bledman (Gold)
- Marc Burns (Gold)
- Emmanuel Callender (Gold)
- Lalonde Gordon (Gold)
- Deon Lendore (Gold)
- Jarrin Solomon (Gold)
- Richard Thompson (Gold)
- Maureen Manchouck (Gold)
- Peter Elias
- Liam Teague (Silver)

== 2011 awards ==
=== Order of the Republic of Trinidad and Tobago ===
- Ulric Cross

=== Chaconia Medal ===
- Desmond Allum (Silver) [posthumous]
- Susan Craig-Jones (Silver)

=== Hummingbird Medal ===
- Denyse Plummer (Gold)

=== Medal for the Development of Women ===
- Hazel Brown
- Brenda Gopeesingh
- Diana Mahabir-Wyatt

== 2010 awards ==
=== Order of the Republic of Trinidad and Tobago ===
- Karl Hudson-Phillips, QC
- Kamaluddin Mohammed

=== Chaconia Medal ===
- Brian Mac Farlane (Gold)
- Julian Kenny (Gold)
- Margaret Elcock – broadcaster (Silver)

=== Hummingbird Medal ===
Professor Don Jacob - Businessman (Gold)

- Harripersad Dass - Chairman (Silver)

== 2009 awards ==
=== Order of the Republic of Trinidad and Tobago ===
- Jizelle Salandy

=== Chaconia Medal ===
- Dr. Geraldine Roxanne Connor – ethnomusicologist (Gold)
- Dr. Cuthbert Joseph (Gold)
- Len "Boogsie" Sharpe (Gold)

=== Hummingbird Medal ===
- Alvin Corneal (Silver)

== 2008 awards ==
=== Order of the Republic of Trinidad and Tobago ===
- Brian Copeland - Professor
- Bertram “Bertie” Lloyd Marshall, steelpan innovator
- Anthony Williams, steelpan innovator

=== Chaconia Medal ===
- Aaron Armstrong (Gold)
- Keston Bledman (Gold)
- Marc Burns (Gold)
- Emmanuel Callender (Gold)
- Bernard Dulal-Whiteway (Gold)
- Richard Thompson (Gold)
- Meiling Esau (Silver)

== 2007 awards ==
=== Chaconia Medal ===
- Kenneth Gordon (Gold)
- Jizelle Salandy (Gold)

=== Hummingbird Medal ===
- Gerard Besson (Gold)
- Knolly Clarke (Gold)
- Daren Ganga (Gold)

== 2006 awards ==
=== Trinity Cross ===
- none awarded

=== Chaconia Medal ===
- The 2006 World Cup squad and management (Gold)
  - Ivee Pendo
  - Sherie Leen Surla
  - Roda Andrade
  - Haide Esparrago
  - Marvin Andrews
  - Chris Birchall
  - Atiba Charles
  - Ian Cox
  - Carlos Edwards
  - Cornell Glen
  - Cyd Gray
  - Shaka Hislop
  - Clayton Ince
  - Kelvin Jack
  - Avery John
  - Stern John
  - Kenwyne Jones
  - Russell Latapy
  - Dennis Lawrence
  - Collin Samuel
  - Brent Sancho
  - Jason Scotland
  - Densill Theobald
  - Aurtis Whitley
  - Evans Wise
  - Anthony Wolfe
  - Dwight Yorke
  - Leo Beenhakker (coach)
- Professor David Picou MD (Gold)
- Professor Hubert Daisley (Gold)
- Glenn Erwin Tucker (Gold)
- William Laurence Chen (Silver)

=== Hummingbird Medal ===
- Anetta Archer (Gold)
- Feroza Rose Mohammed (Gold)
- Indi-Art Orchestra Musical Orchestra (Gold)
- Soroptimist International of Port-of-Spain (Gold)
- The Toco Foundation Organisation (Gold)
- Elizabeth Helena Percy (Silver), (posthumous)
- Cousilla Persad (Silver)
- Carlton Phillip (Silver)
- Ralph St Clair Davies (Silver)
- Kelvin Guy Choy Aming (Silver)
- Gary Straker's Pan School Organisation (Silver)
- Edwin Joseph Skinner (Silver)
- Dudnath Ramkeesoon (Silver)
- Renny Quow, sprinter (Silver)
- Rhonda Watkins (Silver)

=== Public Service Medal of Merit ===
- Deosaran Jagroo (Gold)
- Andrew Llewellyn Tyson (Gold) (posthumous)
- Carol Clark (Gold)
- Victoria Mendez-Charles (Gold)
- Paula Hazel-Dawn Daniel (Gold)
- Jagdeo Maharaj (Gold)
- Valerie Minnie Foster (Silver) (posthumous)
- Irma Sanowar (Silver)

== 2005 awards ==
=== Trinity Cross ===
- Edwin Carrington, Caricom Secretary General

=== Chaconia Medal ===
- Keith Chiang Awong (Gold)
- Prof Andrew Madan Ramroop (Gold)
- Justice Lionel Jones (Gold)
- Dr Aleem Mohammed (Gold)
- Carol Keller (Gold)
- Bertille St Clair, football manager (Silver)
- Francis Mungroo (Silver)
- Rudranath Indarsingh (Silver)
- Edward Henry Sealey (Silver)

=== Hummingbird Medal ===
- Noble Douglas (Gold)
- Elise Joseph (Gold)
- Edward Beharry (Gold)
- John Frankie Asche (Gold)
- Sedley Joseph (Gold)
- Trinidad Steel Percussion Orchestra (Gold)
- Heeralal Rampartap (Silver)
- Wayne Naranjit (posthumous) (Silver)
- Molly Boxhill (Silver)
- Bill Trotman (Silver)
- Kirk Fakira (Silver)
- Michael Marcellin (Silver)
- Alix Archer De Silva (Silver)
- Peter Samuel (Silver)
- Ria Ramnarine (Silver)

=== Public Service Medal of Merit ===
- Yolande Gooding (Gold)
- Sr Petronella Joseph (Gold)
- Hyacinth McDowall (Gold)
- Ahmed Ali (Gold)
- Annette Alfred (Gold)
- John Antoine (Gold)
- J. David Ramkeesoon (Gold)
- Nature Seekers (Gold)
- MOMS for Literacy (Caribbean) (Gold)
- Mother's Union Children's Home (Gold)
- Louise Angelina Mc Intosh (Gold)
- Myra Catherine Greaves (Silver)
- Daisy Maria James McClean (Silver)
- Gloria Elizabeth Nurse (Silver)

== 2004 awards ==
=== Trinity Cross ===
- none awarded

=== Chaconia Medal ===
- Stephen Ames (Gold)
- Arthur Lok Jack (Gold)
- Zadia Rajnauth (Gold)
- Sarah Whiteman (Gold)
- Malcolm Jones (Gold)
- Joan Massiah (Gold)
- George Bovell, Olympic swimmer (Gold)
- Fenrick De Four (posthumous) (Silver)
- Malick Folk Performing Company, Dance Company (Silver)
- Clico Shiv Shakti Dance Company, Dance Company (Silver)

=== Hummingbird Medal ===
- Cynthia Bell (Gold)
- Alyson Brown (Gold)
- Roy Cape (Gold)
- Barnabas Ramon-Fortune (Gold)
- Felix Roach (Gold)
- The WR Torres Foundation for the Blind (Gold)
- Edward Williams (posthumous) (Gold)
- Jacqueline Koon How (Gold)
- Veera Bhajan (Silver)
- Vishwanath Arjoon (Silver)
- Raj Karan Jadoo (Silver)
- Emmanuel Juman (Silver)
- The Lara Brothers Parang Group (Silver)
- Albert "Al" Ramsawack (Silver)
- Chandardath Sookram (Silver)
- Rhonda Charles (Silver)

=== Medal of Merit ===
- Joseph Allard (Gold)
- Cislyn Baptiste (Gold)
- Pamella Benson (Gold)
- Carl de Souza (posthumous) (Gold)
- Kenneth Phillip (Gold)
- Frank Porter (Gold)

== 2003 Awards ==
=== Trinity Cross ===
- Ken Julien

=== Chaconia Medal ===
- André Tanker (Gold) (posthumously)
- Exodus Steel Orchestra (Gold)
- Robert Riley (Gold)

=== Hummingbird Medal ===
- George Bovell (Gold)
- Winston Bailey ("Shadow") (Silver)
- Jean Talma (Silver)
- Wayne Crooks (Silver)

=== Medal of Merit ===
- Shireen Dewan-Mc Ken (Silver)

== 2002 awards ==
=== Trinity Cross ===
- The Right Honourable Dr Eric Eustace Williams (posthumous)

=== Chaconia Medal (Gold) ===
- Prof. Hylton McFarlance
- Professor Thomas Ainsworth Harewood
- Trevor Michael Boopsingh
- Arthur Reginald Roberts (posthumous)

== 2001 awards ==
=== Chaconia Medal (Gold) ===
- Vindar Rabindrath Dean-Maharaj
- Dr Iqbal Mohammed
- Dr Rajandaye Ramkissoon-Chen
- Mr Colin Laird

== 2000 awards ==
=== Trinity Cross ===
- Archbishop Anthony Pantin [posthumous]

=== Chaconia Medal (Gold) ===
- Annette Des Isles
- Dr Neville Jankey
- Courtney Andrew Walsh
- Patrick Brennan Burke
- Professor Harrinath D. Maharaj
- Dr Norbert Masson

== 1999 awards ==
=== Trinity Cross ===
- Dr Henry Wesley Moulton Collymore MBBS, FRCS
- Chief Eleazar Chukwuemeka Anyaoku, Con Adazie of Obosi, Ogwumba of Idemili (Honorary)

=== Chaconia Medal (Gold) ===
- Justice Zainool Hosein
- Trevor A. Lee, SC
- Dwight Yorke, footballer
- Lawrence Duprey
- Dr Tim Dhanraj Gopeesingh

== 1998 awards ==
=== Trinity Cross ===
- Bowles, Sylvan ]posthumous]

=== Chaconia Medal (Gold) ===
- Sharma, Justice Satnarine (Mr)
- Ibrahim, Justice Mustapha (Mr)
- Fitzwilliam, Wendy (Miss)
- Sabga, Anthony Norman (Mr)

== 1997 awards ==
=== Trinity Cross ===
- Robinson, Arthur N. R. (His Excellency)

=== Chaconia Medal (Gold) ===
- Boldon, Ato Jabari (Mr), athlete
- Davis, James Anthony (Hon. Mr Justice)
- Gopeesingh, Lloyd Balraj (Hon. Mr Justice) [posthumous]
- Hubah, Clarence Evans (Dr), MBE
- Lalla, Kenneth Ramsanta (Mr), SC
- Thomas, Christopher Roy (Mr), Ambassador
- Tim Pow, Ainsley Vincent Maurice (Mr)

== 1996 awards ==
=== Trinity Cross ===
- De la Bastide, Michael Anthony (Mr)
- Minshall, Peter (Mr), Carnival artist

=== Chaconia Medal (Gold) ===
- Andrews, John Peter (Mr)
- Gomez, Gerald Ethridge (Mr) [posthumous]
- Petrotrin Invaders Steel Orchestra
- Pierre, Lennox Oscar (Mr) [posthumous]
- Queen's Park Cricket Club
- Ramchand, Kenneth (Professor)

== 1995 awards ==
=== Trinity Cross ===
- Bishop, Patricia Alison (Miss), HBM
- Pantin, Gerard Arthur (Fr), C.S.Sp.

=== Chaconia Medal (Gold) ===
- Alcantara, Joyce Angela (Miss)
- Furness-Smith, John Gerald (Mr), SC
- Ramadhin, Sonny (Mr), cricketer
- Selvon, Samuel Dickson (Mr), writer [posthumous]

=== Public Service Medal of Merit (Silver) ===
- Browne, Elaine Lenora

== 1994 awards ==
=== Trinity Cross ===
- Lara, Brian (Mr), international cricketer

=== Chaconia Medal (Gold) ===
- Bobb, Euric (Dr) - Ph.D.
- De Leon "Roaring Lion", Rafael (Mr)
- Pitt-Miller, Phyllis Leonora (Dr)

== 1993 awards ==
=== Trinity Cross ===
- Hassanali, Noor M. (His Excellency)
- Walcott, Derek (Mr) (Honorary), writer

=== Chaconia Medal (Gold) ===
- Barrow, Russell William (Dr)
- Barsotti, Frank Andral (Mr) - M.A. Cantab
- Francisco "Mighty Sparrow", Slinger (Mr), calypsonian
- James, Alphonso Philbert Theophilus (Mr) [posthumous]
- Jorsling, Mc Donald Phillip (Mr)
- Roopnarinesingh, Syam Sundar (Professor)
- Sawh, Lall Ramnath (Dr)

== 1992 awards ==
=== Chaconia Medal (Gold) ===
- Addo, Edward Adotey (Dr)
- AMOCO Renegades Steel Orchestra
- Griffith, Elton George (The Most Reverend His Grace Dr)
- Henry, Mervyn Ulrick (Dr)
- John, Selwyn Alfred (Mr)
- Marshall, Bertie Lloyd (Mr)
- Murray, Lance Esme Hamilton (Mr)
- Vyas, Ramdath (Pundit)
- WITCO Desperadoes Steel Orchestra
- Wong Sang, Joyce Angela (Mrs)

== 1991 awards ==
=== Trinity Cross ===
- The Regiment of the Trinidad and Tobago Defence Force
- The Trinidad and Tobago Police Service

=== Chaconia Medal (Gold) ===
- Freeman, William E. (Mr) [posthumous], B.Sc. (Lond), A.R.C.S.
- Glean, Vernon (Mr)
- Knox, Wilfred Sidney (Mr)
- Media Association of Trinidad and Tobago
- Naraynsingh, Vijay (Dr)
- Neehall, John Edward (Dr)
- Norton, Noel Patrick (Mr)
- Richards, Rolf (Professor)
- The Trinidad and Tobago Fire Service
- The Trinidad and Tobago Prison Service

=== Chaconia Medal (silver) ===
- Anand Yankarran (Mr) [Entertainer]

== 1990 awards ==
=== Chaconia Medal (Gold) ===
- Aziz, Mohammed Ali (Dr)
- Busby, George Oliver David (Dr)
- Campbell, Alton A. (Mr)
- Des Iles, Gerard Emmanuel (Hon. Mr Justice)
- Deyalsingh, Lennox (Hon. Mr Justice)
- Lai-Fook, Arthur E. (Rev. Fr)
- Mahase, Anna (Dr)
- Ratan, Premchand N. (Dr)
- Sinanan, Ashford (Mr)

=== Hummingbird Medal (Gold) ===
- Beddoes, Andrew
- Connor, Maurice
- Eckels, Juliet Mary
- Griffiths, Jason
- Hanoonmansingh, Hans
- Saidwan, Dean
- Sealey, Joslynne
- Taylor, Gretta Patricia

== 1989 awards ==
=== Trinity Cross ===
- McBurnie, Beryl Eugenia (Dr), H.B.M.
- Naipaul, Vidia S. (Mr) - H.B.M.

=== Chaconia Medal (Gold) ===
- Boswell-Inniss, Kathleen Sheila (Mrs)
- Capildeo, Simbhoonath (Mr)
- Ghouralal, Samuel (Dr)
- Ince, Winston Edghill (Dr)
- National football Team (Strike Squad)

=== Hummingbird Medal (Silver) ===
- Marshall, Stanley Laurie (Mr) - Drama (Silver)

== 1988 awards ==
=== Trinity Cross ===
- Demas, William Gilbert (Mr)
- Duprey, Cyril (Mr)

=== Chaconia Medal (Gold) ===
- Abidh, Stella (Dr)
- Hosein, Inayat (Mr)
- Lequay, Alloy (Mr)
- Lovelace, Earl (Mr)
- Narine, Ralph (Justice)
- Omah-Maharajh, Deonarayan (Dr), President General of the Sanatan Dharma Maha Sabha
- Sammy, George (Professor) [posthumous]
- Warner, Alcalde (Justice)

== 1987 awards ==
=== Public Service Gold Medal of Merit ===
- Charles, Randolph T, Former Commissioner of Prisons Public Service

=== Trinity Cross ===
- Bernard, Clinton (The Hon. Mr Justice)
- James, C. L. R. (Mr), historian
- Pan Trinbago
- Weekes, George (Mr)

=== Chaconia Medal (Gold) ===
- Butler, Knolly (Professor)
- Byam, Neville (Dr)
- Carrington, Edwin (Sir), former Secretary-General of CARICOM
- Laronde, Giselle (Miss), beauty pageant titleholder
- Rambachand, Anand (Professor)
- Stewart, Leslie "Tiger" (Mr), boxer

=== Chaconia Medal (Silver) ===
- Girdharie, Sohan
- Malloon, Grace Atteck
- Minshall, Peter
- Sharpe, Len (Boogsie)

== 1986 awards ==
=== Chaconia Medal (Gold) ===
- Alleyne, Doddridge Henry Newton (Mr)
- Lewis, James O'Neil (Mr) (Awarded in 1974)
- Rampersad, Frank Budhoo (Mr)

== 1985 awards ==
=== Trinity Cross ===
- Kelsick, Cecil (The Hon. Mr Justice)

=== Chaconia Medal (Gold) ===
- Braithwaite, John (Mr)
- Seukeran, Lionel Frank (Mr)

== 1984 awards ==
=== Chaconia Medal (Gold) ===
- Wooding, Hugh Arthur Selby (Mr)

== 1983 awards ==
=== Chaconia Medal (Gold) ===
- Cross, Ulric, (Mr)
- Rees, Evan (Mr)
- Sosa, Thomas Gregorio (Mr)

== 1982 awards ==
=== Trinity Cross ===
- Hosein, Tajmool (Mr)

=== Chaconia Medal (Gold) ===
- Annisette, Emmanuel B. (Mr)
- Besson, Herman Alexander (Mr) [posthumous]
- Bramble, Cecil (Mr) [posthumous]
- Crichlow, Verna Mercedes (Mrs) [posthumous]
- Lewis, Anthony Clyde (Mr)
- Noel, Claude Benjamin (Mr)
- Pollonais, Rene Joseph (Mr)
- Richardson, Reginald Kenneth (Dr)

== 1981 awards ==
=== Trinity Cross ===
- Teshea, Isabella (Mrs) [posthumous]

=== Chaconia Medal (Gold) ===
- Corbin, Maurice (Mr)
- Date-Camps, Ada (Dr)
- Harnarayan, Percival (Mr)
- Kirton, Gertrude (Mrs)
- Padmore, Marjorie (Miss) [posthumous]
- Scott, Garvin (Mr)

== 1980 awards ==
=== Trinity Cross ===
- Bruce, Victor (Mr) - H.B.M.
- Burroughs, Randolph (Mr), M.O.M.
- Gregoire, Errol (Mr)
- Williams, Mervyn (Commander), M.O.M.

=== Chaconia Medal (Gold) ===
- Bonnett, Lionel (Mr), Chairman, Tobago County Council
- Chadee, Dalton (Mr), Former Alderman and Deputy Mayor of San Fernando Borough Council
- Mahabir, Bisram (Dr)
- Quamina, Elizabeth (Dr)
- Roopnarine, Errol (Mr) [posthumous]
- Scott, Winfield (Mr)
- Spence, John A. [Professor]
- Wilson, Oswald (Mr)

== 1979 awards ==
=== Trinity Cross ===
- Montano, Gerard (Mr)
- Phillips, Clement Ewart Gladstone (Mr)
- Pierre, Eugenia Theodosia (Mrs), C.M.T., H.B.M.
- Sinanan, Mitra G. (Mr)

=== Chaconia Medal (Gold) ===
- Patrick Castagne, composer
- Thomas Gatcliffe
- Solomon Lutchman
- Harry Orville Phelps
- Robert Sellier
- Jeff Stollmeyer, cricketer and footballer

The following were members of the Trinidad and Tobago national netball team that were gold medallists at the 1979 World Netball Tournament.

- Ingrid Blackman
- Angela Burke-Brown
- Peggy Castanada
- Heather Charleau
- Cyrenia Charles
- Marcia Dimsoy
- Jennifer Nurse
- Sherril Peters
- Jean Pierre
- Veryl Prescod
- Althea Thomas-Luces
- Jennifer Williams

== 1978 awards ==
=== Trinity Cross ===
- Serrette, Joffre Charles Harold (Brigadier)
- Solomon, Patrick Vincent Joseph (Dr)
- Wharton, Joseph Algernon (Mr), QC

=== Chaconia Medal (Gold) ===
- Dolly, Reynold Cartright (Dr)
- Galt, Kenneth Victor (Mr) [posthumous]
- Garcia, Ignacio Adrian (Mr)
- Murray, Eric Hugh (Mr)
- Patrick, Alan Leslie (Dr)
- Rostant, Louis Gerald (Mr)
- Seemungal, Lionel Augustine (Mr), S.C., M.A., LL.B. (Cantab.)

== 1977 awards ==
=== Trinity Cross ===
- Ali, Wahid (Dr)
- Amoroso, Emmanuel Ciprian (Professor)
- Commissiong, Janelle Penny (Miss), former beauty pageant titleholder
- Reece, Sir Alan

=== Chaconia Medal (Gold) ===
- Bailey, Emmanuel McDonald (Mr), athlete
- Duprey, Cyril, OBE, businessman, founder of CLICO
- Ghany, Noor Mohammed (Mr)
- Holder, Joseph Hamiltion (Mr)
- Inglefield, Geoffrey Robert (Mr)
- Murray, Arthur (Mr)
- Richards, George Maxwell (Mr)

== 1976 awards ==
=== Trinity Cross ===
- Crawford, Hasely Joachim
- Maingot, Rodney
- Pitt, David Thomas (Lord)
- Thomasos, Clytus Arnold

=== Chaconia Medal ===
- Barcant, Malcolm (Gold)
- Beaubrun, Michael Herbert (Gold)
- Dieffenthaller, Raymond Edwin (Gold)
- McNish, Althea (Mrs John Weiss) (Gold)
- Reece, Erna (Gold)
- Ward, Joshua Emmanuel (Gold)
- Hingwan, Edwin (posthumous) (Silver)
- Melchor, M. NACION GOLD CROSS MEDAL P/C SOLDIER G,O.627

== 1975 awards ==
=== Chaconia Medal (Gold) ===
- Bartholomew, Courtenay (Dr)
- Crichlow, Nathaniel (Senator) - trade unionist
- Dymally, Mervyn (Senator)
- Henry, Zin (Dr)
- Hudson-Phillips, Henry, QC
- Lloyd, Clive, CBE, AO - West Indies cricketer (Honorary)
- Murray, Deryck (Mr)
- Poon King, Theodosius (Dr)
- Robinson, Sir Harold
- Walls, Victor (Rev. Dr)

== 1974 awards ==
=== Public Service Gold Medal of Merit ===
- Beard, Eugene Edwin
- Beckles, Agatha
- Bruno, Winzey Anthony
- Busby, Arthur Hamilton
- Clemendore, Anthony
- D'Abadie, Raymond Joseph
- Duncan, Vincent Gregory
- Hargreave, Evelyn Victoria
- Holder, George Ethelbert
- Kalloo, Emmanuel Nicholas
- McShine, Irene Umilta
- Maraj, James
- Mitchell, Lionel Paul
- Munroe, George
- Pyles, Oscar Emmanuel
- Sawyer, Olive Theodore
- Shepherd, Gertrude Enid
- Simon, Winston "Spree"
- Siung, Oswald Horace
- Smith, John Lyon
- Telemaque, Harold Milton
- Thomasos, Theodora
- Wellington, Oswald Elrick

=== Chaconia Medal (Gold) ===
- Blackman, Fitzgerald (Alderman) [posthumous]
- De la Bastide, Karl Phillipe De Jacques (Justice)
- Gibbs, Lance (Mr) (Honorary)
- Julien, Bernard (Mr)
- Kanhai, Rohan (Mr) (Honorary)
- Pierre, Joseph Henry (Sir)
- Rowe, Lawrence (Mr) (Honorary)
- Wattley, George Hippolyte (Dr)

== 1973 awards ==
=== Trinity Cross ===
- La Borde, Charles Harold (Mr)
- La Borde, Mary Kwailan (Mrs)
- Boos, Werner James (Sir), CBE [posthumous]
- Hyatali, Isaac (The Honourable Sir)

=== Chaconia Medal (Gold) ===
- Archbald-Crichlow, Beryl May (Mrs)
- Armoogam, George Victor (Mr)
- Atteck, Sybil (Miss)
- O'Connor, Quintin (Mr) [posthumous]
- Vaucrosson, Walter Ferdinand (Dr)
- Waite, Joan Teresa (Sister)

== 1972 awards ==
=== Trinity Cross ===
- Archbald, Rupert Carlyle, QC
- Marcano, George Roderick (Dr)
- Sobers, Garfield St. Auburn, West Indies cricketer AO, OCC - [Honorary]

=== Chaconia Medal (Gold) ===
- Boucard, Dennis (Mr)
- Girwar, Norman (Mr)
- Mc Naughton-Jones, Cynthia (Mrs)

== 1971 awards ==
=== Trinity Cross ===
- Barboza, Mario Gibson (Mr)
- Constantine, Learie (Baron) - [posthumous]
- Maurice, Julius Hamilton (Mr)
- Mc Shine, Arthur Hugh (Sir) - Kt. Bach.

=== Chaconia Medal (Gold) ===
- Francis, Aldwin Gerard (Dr)
- Hoyte, Ralph Allan St. Clair (Dr)
- Johnstone, Helen May (Mrs) - CBE
- Julien, Kenneth (Professor)
- Julien, Mark Thomas Inskip (Senator)
- Lewis, Leon Ferdinand Earle (Dr)

=== Chaconia Medal (Silver) ===
- Cyril Gonzalez

=== Chaconia Medal (Bronze) ===
- Maisabelle Brathwaite
- Tricia Jack

=== Hummingbird Medal (Gold) ===
- Louis Nathaniel Blache-Fraser
- Seilochan Babsie Dolsingh
- Jacob Delworth Elder
- Pedro Dionisio Valdez (Reverend Father)
- Ronald Jay Williams

=== Hummingbird Medal (Silver) ===
- Kelvin Aleong
- George Christopher Beckles
- Claudius Fitzgerald Clunes
- Horace James
- Irvin McWilliams
- Michael Pascall (The Reverend Father)
- Tarran Persad
- Clifford Archibald Roach

=== Hummingbird Medal (Bronze) ===
- Hugh Borde

=== Public Service Medal of Merit (Gold) ===
- Stella Piari Abidh (Dr)
- Francis Eustace Bernard
- David Bloom (Captain)
- Carlos Lushington Kendall
- Albert Mark [posthumous]
- Claud Anthony May
- Bernard Primus
- Karl Seheult
- Siparia Community Welfare Council
- Texaco Credit Union
- Tobago United Co-operative Society

=== Public Service Medal of Merit (Silver) ===
- Carlton Comma
- Bisram Gopie
- Edmund Jones (Dr)
- Blanche Lewis
- Peter Roach
- Arthur Watson (Captain)

=== Public Service Medal of Merit (Bronze) ===
- Ralph Charles
- Helena Manning
- Christopher Webb

== 1970 awards ==
=== Trinity Cross ===
- Tubal Uriah Butler (Mr), labour leader
- Donald C. Granado (His Excellency)
- George Richards QC

=== Chaconia Medal (Gold) ===
- Wilfred D. Best (Mr)
- Edwin Lee Lum (Mr)
- Grant E. Pilgrim (Mr)
- Elbert Robertson (Dr)
- David A. Wyke (Dr)

=== Chaconia Medal (Silver) ===
- Lystra Charles
- Stephen Moosai-Maharaj
- Clive Spencer

=== Chaconia Medal (Bronze) ===
- Eileen Douglas-Shaw
- Talbot Paul

=== Hummingbird Medal (Gold) ===
- Wesley Hall
- Vidia S. Naipaul
- Jankie Persad Sharma

=== Hummingbird Medal (Silver) ===
- Allan Aaron
- Henry Archer
- Allan Carr
- Errol Dickerson
- Clement A. Moonsammy
- Jocelyn Pierre
- Kelvin "Mighty Duke" Pope
- Stephanie Scipio-Pollard

=== Hummingbird Medal (Bronze) ===
- Neville Jules
- Narsaloo Ramaya
- Kathleen "Auntie Kay" Warner

=== Public Service Medal of Merit (Gold) ===
- George L. Bowen
- Joffre Serrette

=== Public Service Medal of Merit (Silver) ===
- Cyril Barnes
- David Bloom
- Keith Brathwaite
- Clebert Grayson
- Marjorie Guy
- Claud Anthony May
- Eric Mc Carthy
- Ignatius Mc Phillip
- David Munro
- Victor Noel
- Wallace Pedro
- Ernest Pierre
- Victor Rique
- Louis J. Rodriguez
- Enos Sewlal
- Julian A. Spencer
- Evelyn Tracey
- Leslie Oliver Weekes
- Mervyn Williams

=== Public Service Medal of Merit (Bronze) ===
- Aubrey Adams
- William Charles
- Hubert Cox
- Franklyn De Gale
- Fitz James Demas
- Hansley Greaves
- Oscar Joseph
- Sieunarine Maraj
- Francis Rigaud
- Percival Roach
- Ethelbert Sorzano
- Evans Cornelius Wilson

== 1969 awards ==
=== Trinity Cross ===
- Rudranath Capildeo (Dr)
- Ellis Clarke (Sir), CMG, QC
- Solomon Hochoy (His Excellency Sir), GCMG, GCVO, OBE
- Finbar Ryan (His Excellency Count), OP, (former Archbishop of Port of Spain)
- Hugh Wooding (The Right Honourable Sir), PC, CBE, QC

=== Chaconia Medal (Gold) ===
- Lloyd Brathwaite (Professor)
- Leonard Joseph Graf (Reverend Father)
- Kenneth Lindsay Grant (Sir), OBE
- John A. V. Harper (Mr) [posthumous]
- Audrey Jeffers (Miss) [posthumous]
- Karoo Ojah Maharaj (Pundit) MBE
- Louis Anselm Halsey Mc Shine CBE
- James A. Waterman (Dr) OBE

=== Chaconia Medal (Silver) ===
- George Bowen
- Margaret Bynoe
- Harry Joseph
- Ralph Kelshall
- Cevella Niki McBride
- Cleopatra Romilly

=== Hummingbird Medal (Gold) ===
- Winifred Atwell
- Victor Bruce
- Andrew Carr
- William Demas
- Hugh Harris
- Ralph James
- Beryl McBurnie
- Carlyle Missette
- Samuel Selvon
- Derek Walcott [Honorary]
- Olivia Walke M.B.E.
- William Williams

=== Hummingbird Medal (Silver) ===
- George Baileye – carnival bandleader
- Carlisle Chang
- Margaret Cowie
- Slinger "Mighty Sparrow" Francisco
- Roger Gibbon
- Ellie Mannette
- Aldwyn Roberts

=== Hummingbird Medal (Bronze) ===
- Ken Morris
- Krishna Persad
- Edwin Roberts
- Anthony Williams

=== Public Service Medal of Merit (Gold) ===
- M. P. Alladin
- Randolph Burroughs
- Stanely Johnson
- Mathieu Lee Sing
- Sylvester Nicholas
- Carlton Ottley
- James P. Reid

=== Public Service Medal of Merit (Silver) ===
- Norbert Brown
- Helen De Verteuil MBE
- Reginald V. Hogan
- Eric James MBE
- Lystra Lewis MBE
- Fitz G. Maynard
- James Mc Donald
- George Mose
- Marjorie Padmore
- Sydney Ramdial
- Mary M. Scandella
- Sydney Turpin
- Raymond Watkins
- Willoughby Weekes
- Charles F. Worme

== Constitutional controversy ==
On 17 April 2008 the Cabinet agreed that the name of the highest national award should be The Order of the Republic of Trinidad and Tobago, that the name of the Society to replace the Order of the Trinity should be The Distinguished Society of Trinidad and Tobago, that the highest national award should be re-designed so as to replace the Cross with a Medal and that the Letters Patent should be amended to give effect to those decisions.

Subsequently, in Sanatan Dharma Maha Sabha of Trinidad and Tobago Inc & Ors v Attorney General of Trinidad and Tobago [2009] UKPC 17 (28 April 2009) the Judicial Committee of the Privy Council in London, on appeal from the Court of Appeal of Trinidad and Tobago, held that the creation of the Trinity Cross of the Order of the Trinity breached the constitutional rights of non-Christians to equality and to freedom of conscience and belief. However, the council also made a declaration that the judgment should not have retrospective effect: "nothing in this judgment should be taken to apply to any awards of this high honour that were made under the system that the Letters Patent established before the date of the.. judgment." (per Lord Hope of Craighead at para 42).
