= Jason Scotland =

Trinidad and Tobago footballer (born 1979)

Jason Scotland CM
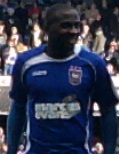
- Scotland with Ipswich Town in 2010

Personal information
- Full name: Jason Kelvin Scotland
- Date of birth: 18 February 1979 (age 47)
- Place of birth: Morvant, Trinidad and Tobago
- Height: 5 ft 8 in (1.73 m)
- Position: Striker

Senior career*
Years	Team	Apps	(Gls)
1996–1997	San Juan Jabloteh		
1998–2002	Defence Force		
2003–2005	Dundee United	50	(8)
2005–2007	St Johnstone	66	(33)
2007–2009	Swansea City	90	(45)
2009–2010	Wigan Athletic	32	(1)
2010–2013	Ipswich Town	87	(19)
2013–2014	Barnsley	38	(8)
2014–2015	Hamilton Academical	27	(10)
2015	Hamilton Academical	12	(3)
2015–2016	Stenhousemuir	15	(5)
Total		417	(132)

International career
2000–2012	Trinidad and Tobago	41	(8)
- * Club domestic league appearances and goals

Jason Kelvin Scotland CM (born 18 February 1979) is a Trinidadian professional football coach and former player who played as a striker. He was last coach of Larkhall Thistle.

Scotland started his footballing career in his native Trinidad and Tobago before moving to play professionally for Scottish club Dundee United. He has also had spells with St Johnstone, Swansea City, Wigan Athletic, Ipswich Town, Barnsley and Hamilton Academical.

He made 41 international appearances and scored 8 goals for Trinidad and Tobago between 2000 and 2012, playing at the 2005 CONCACAF Gold Cup and the 2006 FIFA World Cup.

== Club career ==
=== Early career and Dundee United ===
Born in Morvant, Trinidad and Tobago, after playing for Malick Senior Comprehensive School, Scotland went on to play with San Juan Jabloteh – for whom he scored nine goals in as many league games – and Defence Force, where he scored 30 goals in 31 league appearances. This goalscoring form earned him a trial with Scottish side Dundee United in May 2003 alongside fellow Trinidad player Devon Mitchell.

After impressing the staff, Scotland joined compatriot Collin Samuel at Tannadice after gaining a work permit in July. After making his debut in August 2003, Scotland featured mostly as a substitute in his first season and was wanted on loan by Northern Irish club Linfield in January 2004, although no move materialised. In March, Scotland scored his first goal for United, netting in a 3–2 win at Livingston and four days later scored the only goal in a 1–0 home win against Motherwell. With three more goals that season, Scotland scored five league goals from 21 appearances, with the majority as substitute appearances, and was awarded a new contract.

In Scotland's second season, it again took him several months to score, netting his first of the season in late December. In April, however, Scotland scored perhaps his most important goal of the season, netting the winner in the Scottish Cup semi-final to take United into the final. He went on to play the full 90 minutes of the showpiece match as United narrowly lost 1–0 to Celtic.

=== St Johnstone ===
In July 2005, Scotland was denied a new work permit and the club made an appeal, which was deemed unsuccessful by a Scottish Premier League appeals committee. Within three weeks, St Johnstone of the Scottish First Division were successful in gaining a work permit for the player – despite using the same dossier as United had presented previously. Scotland went on to net 15 goals in 31 league appearances in his first season at McDiarmid Park, including a goal on his debut and a hat-trick in April. He was named in Trinidad Tobago's 2006 FIFA World Cup squad. Scotland's second season produced 18 league goals, including a goal against former club Dundee United in a League Cup match; despite his goal against his former club, he received a warm reception from the United fans. In February 2007, Scotland was the subject of racist taunts by a small section of Motherwell fans during St Johnstone's visit to Fir Park in the quarter-finals of the Scottish Cup. He went on to score Saints' second goal in a 2–1 victory. In April 2007, Scotland was one of three St Johnstone players named in the SPFA's Scottish Division One 'Team of the Year', voted for by the managers. At the end of the 2006–07 season, in his two campaigns with St Johnstone, Scotland had scored 33 goals in 66 league games for the club, an average of one every two games.

=== Swansea City ===
In May 2007, Scotland signed for Swansea City for a fee of £25,000 subject to obtaining a work permit, which was granted on 4 July. He scored on his debut and he helped the team to promotion to the Football League Championship, finishing the season with 29 goals in all competitions – the division's top scorer – and also earning himself a place in the PFA Team of the Year.

Scotland netted a 78th minute penalty kick against Plymouth Argyle on 10 March 2009, his 50th goal for Swansea in all competitions

=== Wigan Athletic ===
Scotland signed for Wigan on a three-year contract on 18 July, after receiving international and visa approval. He made his debut as a stoppage time substitute in a 2–0 victory over Aston Villa on 15 August. He scored his first goal for Wigan in the FA Cup against Notts County on 23 January 2010. He scored his first league goal for the club on his 29th league appearance against Fulham on 4 April 2010. He was allowed to leave in June 2010.

=== Ipswich Town ===
Scotland signed for Ipswich Town on 23 August 2010, initially on a two-year deal for a fee of £500,000. He made his Ipswich debut against Crewe in the League Cup and then scored his first goal for the club on his league debut against Bristol City on 28 August 2010. In April 2012, he was praised by manager Paul Jewell for turning down a clause in his contract which would have meant that he would have received a wage increase.

He left Ipswich Town on 21 January 2013, after agreeing a contract settlement. The move proved somewhat controversial among some fans of the club considering Scotland had developed into somewhat of a fan favourite as an impact substitute. It was also deemed a rash move from the club since fellow striker Nathan Ellington remained at the club with a goal total of zero.

=== Barnsley ===
On 28 January 2013 it was announced that Scotland signed for Championship side Barnsley until the end of the season. His first appearance for Barnsley came as a substitute in a 2–0 victory against Millwall at Oakwell, where he scored the second goal, only a few minutes after coming on to the field of play.

On 4 May 2013, he scored Barnsley's second goal in a 2–2 draw away against Huddersfield Town, heading home a David Perkins cross, helping Barnsley to a point which ultimately secured the Reds' place in the Championship for another season.

=== Hamilton Academical ===
On 22 January 2014, Scotland signed for Hamilton Academical on a free transfer. He scored against Hibernian in the second leg of a promotion/relegation play-off on 25 May, also scoring in the subsequent penalty shootout as Hamilton won promotion to the Scottish Premiership.

He was released by Hamilton on 3 January 2015, but then re-signed for the club on 27 January 2015 until the end of the season. He was released by Hamilton after the 2014–15 season.

=== Stenhousemuir ===
Scotland signed a short-term contract with Stenhousemuir in October 2015.

=== Lochee Harp JFC ===
On 1 February 2018, Scotland penned a short-term deal with Dundee-based East Region/North Division side Lochee Harp.

On 29 March 2019, Scotland joined the Nico's Cafe Bar pub team until the end of the season.

== International career ==
Scotland made his debut for Trinidad and Tobago in 2000 and went on to earn 41 cap, scoring 8 goals. He was a member of the squad at the 2005 CONCACAF Gold Cup and also at the 2006 FIFA World Cup, but saw no playing time in the latter tournament. In September 2011, he announced his retirement from international football to concentrate on his club career with Ipswich Town.

== Coaching career ==
In 2017, Scotland returned to Hamilton Academical, one of his former clubs as a player, to become a coach specialising in training their forwards, while also assisting with their youth academy teams. He left the club in January 2019 along with the manager Martin Canning in a staffing restructure.

Prior to the start of the 2021 season, Scotland joined the coaching team at Larkhall Thistle.

== Personal life ==
As a member of the squad that competed at the 2006 FIFA World Cup in Germany, Scotland was awarded the Chaconia Medal (Gold Class), the second highest state decoration of Trinidad and Tobago.

== In popular culture ==
In June 2006, ahead of that year's FIFA World Cup, he was the subject of the song "Scotland, Scotland, Jason Scotland" by The Trinidad and Tobago Tartan Army. The song topped the Scottish Singles Chart and peaked at number 30 in the UK Singles Chart.

== Career statistics ==
=== Club ===
Appearances and goals by club, season and competition
Club	Season	League			National cup		League cup		Other		Total	
Club	Season	Division	Apps	Goals	Apps	Goals	Apps	Goals	Apps	Goals	Apps	Goals
Dundee United	2003–04	Scottish Premier League	21	5	1	0	1	0	—		23	5
Dundee United	2004–05	Scottish Premier League	29	3	4	1	4	1	—		37	5
Dundee United	Total		50	8	5	1	5	1	0	0	60	10
St Johnstone	2005–06	Scottish First Division	31	15	3	1	1	0	0	0	35	16
St Johnstone	2006–07	Scottish First Division	35	18	5	2	6	6	0	0	46	26
St Johnstone	Total		66	33	8	3	7	6	0	0	81	42
Swansea City	2007–08	League One	45	24	4	2	2	1	3 (Note: Appearances in Football League Trophy)	2	54	29
Swansea City	2008–09	Championship	45	21	3	0	3	3	—		51	24
Swansea City	Total		90	45	7	2	5	4	3	2	105	53
Wigan Athletic	2009–10	Premier League	32	1	3	1	1	0	—		36	2
Ipswich Town	2010–11	Championship	39	10	1	0	5	0	—		45	10
Ipswich Town	2011–12	Championship	36	8	1	1	1	0	—		38	9
Ipswich Town	2012–13	Championship	12	1	0	0	2	1	—		14	2
Ipswich Town	Total		87	19	2	1	8	1	0	0	97	21
Barnsley	2012–13	Championship	18	6	2	0	0	0	—		20	6
Barnsley	2013–14	Championship	20	2	1	0	2	0	—		23	2
Barnsley	Total		38	8	3	0	2	0	0	0	43	8
Hamilton Academical	2013–14	Scottish Championship	15	8	0	0	0	0	4 (Note: Appearance in Scottish Premiership play-offs)	1	19	9
Hamilton Academical	2014–15	Scottish Premiership	24	5	1	0	2	0	—		27	5
Hamilton Academical	Total		39	13	1	0	2	0	4	1	46	14
Stenhousemuir	2015–16	Scottish League One	15	5	2	1	0	0	0	0	17	6
Career total			417	132	31	9	30	12	7	3	485	156

=== International ===
Appearances and goals by national team and year
National team	Year	Apps	Goals
Trinidad and Tobago	2000	1	0
Trinidad and Tobago	2001	2	1
Trinidad and Tobago	2003	10	2
Trinidad and Tobago	2004	4	2
Trinidad and Tobago	2005	6	0
Trinidad and Tobago	2006	5	0
Trinidad and Tobago	2008	8	3
Trinidad and Tobago	2009	5	0
Total		41	8

Scores and results list Trinidad and Tobago's goal tally first, score column indicates score after each Scotland goal.

List of international goals scored by Jason Scotland, listed by date, venue, cap, opponent, score, result and competition
No.	Date	Venue	Cap	Opponent	Score	Result	Competition	Ref.
1	10 May 2001	Marvin Lee Stadium, Macoya, Trinidad and Tobago	3	Grenada	4–0	5–3	Friendly	
2	29 January 2003	Hasely Crawford Stadium, Port of Spain, Trinidad and Tobago	4	Finland	1–0	1–2	Friendly	
3	23 April 2003	Stade Pierre-Aliker, Fort-de-France, Martinique	8	Martinique	2–0	2–3	2003 CONCACAF Gold Cup	
4	20 June 2004	Manny Ramjohn Stadium, Marabella, Trinidad and Tobago	14	Dominican Republic	1–0	4–0	2006 FIFA World Cup qualification	
5	14 July 2004	Seoul World Cup Stadium, Seoul, South Korea	16	South Korea	1–1	1–1	Friendly	
6	8 October 2008	Hasely Crawford Stadium, Port of Spain, Trinidad and Tobago	33	Dominican Republic	1–0	9–0	Friendly	
7	8 October 2008	Hasely Crawford Stadium, Port of Spain, Trinidad and Tobago	33	Dominican Republic	2–0	9–0	Friendly	
8	8 October 2008	Hasely Crawford Stadium, Port of Spain, Trinidad and Tobago	33	Dominican Republic	3–0	9–0	Friendly	

== Honours ==
Dundee United

- Scottish Cup runner-up: 2004–05

Swansea City

- Football League One: 2007–08

Hamilton Academical

- Scottish Championship: 2013–14

Individual

- TT Pro League Golden Boot: 2000
- Scottish First Division top scorer: 2005–06
- PFA Scotland Team of the Year: 2006–07 First Division
- Football League One Player of the Month: December 2007, March 2008
- Football League One top scorer: 2007–08
- Swansea City Player of the Year: 2007–08
- Trinidad and Tobago Football Federation Player of the Year: 2008
- PFA Team of the Year: 2007–08 League One, 2008–09 Championship
- Football League Championship Player of the Month: February 2009
- Ipswich Town Goal of the Season: 2011–12

Medals

- Chaconia Medal Gold Class: 2006
