= Kelvin Jack =

Trinidadian footballer

Kelvin Jack CM
Personal information
- Full name: Kelvin Kyron Jack
- Date of birth: 29 April 1976 (age 50)
- Place of birth: Trincity, Trinidad, Trinidad and Tobago
- Height: 1.93 m (6 ft 4 in)
- Position: Goalkeeper

Team information
- Current team: Dover Athletic (Goalkeeping coach)

College career
Years	Team	Apps	(Gls)
- Holy Cross College
1997–1998	Yavapai Roughriders		

Senior career*
Years	Team	Apps	(Gls)
1994–1996	Trincity United		
1997	Joe Public	2	(0)
1997–1998	Yavapai Roughriders		
1999	VCU Rams	0	(0)
1999–2000	Doc's Khelwalaas	40	(0)
2000	W Connection	6	(0)
2001–2003	San Juan Jabloteh	49	(0)
2004	Reading	0	(0)
2004–2006	Dundee	16	(0)
2006–2008	Gillingham	9	(0)
2010	Southend United	0	(0)
2010–2011	Darlington	0	(0)
2010–2011	→ Kettering Town (loan)	9	(0)
2011	AFC Hornchurch	1	(0)
2011	Maidstone United	3	(0)
2012	Kettering Town	3	(0)
Total		138	(0)

International career
1997–2006	Trinidad and Tobago	33	(0)

Managerial career
- 2020–: Dover Athletic (goalkeeping coach)
- * Club domestic league appearances and goals

Kelvin Kyron Jack CM (born 29 April 1976) is a Trinidadian former professional football goalkeeper who is goalkeeping coach at Dover Athletic. He earned 33 caps for Trinidad and Tobago between 1997 and 2006, playing for his country in the 2006 FIFA World Cup.

== Playing career ==
Kelvin Jack started his career playing in Trinidad and Tobago with hometown club Trincity United and Joe Public before earning a scholarship to join Yavapai College in Arizona. While a student there he helped the Roughriders win the NJCAA title in his first year and reach the 3rd position the following year. After finishing college he went to Norway for trials before returning to Trinidad, playing most notably with San Juan Jabloteh for two seasons.

Jack started his career in English football with Reading in 2004, but did not make any appearances for the club. Jack was later sold to Scottish Premier League team Dundee, where he stayed despite their relegation to the Scottish First Division.

Jack was a regular member of the Trinidad and Tobago national football team during the qualifying campaign for the 2006 FIFA World Cup, and travelled to Germany as coach Leo Beenhakker's first-choice goalkeeper. He was expected to play in their first game against Sweden but sustained a calf injury in the warm up, enabling Shaka Hislop to step in. Jack, who would later describe the experience as 'the saddest day of his life', also missed out on playing in the team's second match against England.

I [had] picked up a calf strain the week before [the Sweden game], yet another injury. I got intense medical treatment on it; the medical staff was good. I trained twice before the game, and it felt OK. So [I was] warming up before the game and soaking up the atmosphere. During the warm-up while I was kicking, I realized that I couldn't go full out. I couldn't sprint properly, and it felt as though the muscle was actually going to tear. I was on the pitch, and I really didn't tell anybody, I was just monitoring it on my own. At the end of the warm-up session, I went up to [goalkeeper coach] Michael Maurice, and I said, "Brother, I think I'm struggling," and he said, "You sure?" I said, "Yeah, I think I'm struggling big-time." I said, "If I play, I think I could tear [my calf muscle], and if I tear it, that's going to be it, that's going to be the end of my World Cup." Right then and there I made the decision that it made no sense for me to play for my personal glory when I'm not fully fit, and then let the team down. So I told the coach [Leo Beenhakker] what was going on, and he asked me if I was sure. He asked, "Can you try?" I said, "No, I can't do it." The coach didn't get [angry] or perplexed, he just said, "OK my friend." Then he started looking at Clayton [Ince] and Shaka [Hislop]... Shaka was doing a proper warm-up, and Clayton was off to the side juggling some balls and so forth. He looked at them a few times, and he called Shaka and said to him, "You are playing. Are you ready?", and Shaka said, "Yes, I'm ready." and that was that. He put in an inspired performance that day.

Jack did go on to play in the Soca Warriors' final group game against Paraguay, which ended in a 2–0 defeat in which Brent Sancho scored an own goal. The Paraguay match was his final international match.

Following the 2006 FIFA World Cup, Jack signed for Gillingham and made his debut in a 2–1 home win over Huddersfield Town on 5 August. However, in part due to injuries, he made only eleven appearances for the Gills.

In February 2008, Jack joined Barnsley on trial but broke his leg in what was described as a "freak training ground accident". It was announced on 7 May 2008 that he had been released by Gillingham. He had since been training with English lower league clubs Aldershot Town and Southend United in a bid to regain his fitness.

In February 2010, Jack joined Southend United on a short-term contract to act as back-up whilst regular reserve goalkeeper Ian Joyce left on trial with an American club. Without making any appearances he was released at the end of the season on 11 May, and was signed to a one-year contract by Darlington manager Simon Davey for the 2010–11 season. In October, unable to secure a first team place, he joined Kettering Town on a three-month loan. He was released by Darlington in January 2011.

In a bid to keep up his fitness, Jack spent the 2011 pre-season training with Isthmian League Division One South side Maidstone United and appeared in two of the club's pre-season friendlies. Shortly after, on 31 August 2011, Jack made a one-off appearance for Isthmian League Premier Division side AFC Hornchurch, playing in a 2–1 loss away to Lowestoft Town after first-team goalkeeper Darren Behcet picked up an injury. On 11 November 2011, it was announced Jack had again joined up with Maidstone United to cover first-team goalkeeper Charlie Mitten after he suffered a hip injury. He made his debut a day later in a 4–1 win against Ramsgate and made a total of three appearances for the club.

He returned to his former club Kettering Town in March 2012 to provide cover for the injured Laurie Walker, making his debut in their 1–3 defeat to Stockport County on 31 March.

== Coaching career ==
Jack joined the coaching staff of National League side Dover Athletic in the summer of 2020, although he worked behind the scenes until it was announced in early January 2021. He joined a coaching setup consisting of manager Andy Hessenthaler assisted by Jack's former Gillingham teammate Nicky Southall as well as Liam Ridgewell.

== Personal life ==
As a member of the squad that competed at the 2006 FIFA World Cup in Germany, Jack was awarded the Chaconia Medal (Gold Class), the second highest state decoration of Trinidad and Tobago.

He married his longtime girlfriend Shellie-Ann Auguste on 7 June 2007.
