= Clayton Ince =

Trinidad and Tobago footballer (born 1972)

Clayton Ince CM
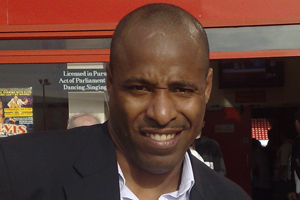
- Ince in 2008

Personal information
- Date of birth: 13 July 1972 (age 54)
- Place of birth: Arima, Trinidad and Tobago
- Height: 6 ft 2 in (1.88 m)
- Position: Goalkeeper

Youth career
- Maple Club

Senior career*
Years	Team	Apps	(Gls)
1991–1996	Fulham SC		
1996–1998	KFC Memphis		
1998–1999	Defence Force		
1999–2005	Crewe Alexandra	123	(0)
2000	→ Dundee (loan)	0	(0)
2005–2006	Coventry City	1	(0)
2006–2010	Walsall	152	(0)
2010–2011	Ma Pau		
2011–2013	T&TEC		
Total		276	(0)

International career
1994–2009	Trinidad and Tobago	79	(0)
- * Club domestic league appearances and goals

Clayton Ince CM (born 13 July 1972) is a Trinidadian former professional footballer who played as a goalkeeper and had lengthy spells in the English Football League at Crewe Alexandra and Walsall. He is his country's most capped goalkeeper with 79 caps for Trinidad and Tobago to date, his debut coming on 17 April 1994 against Martinique (the game ended in a 7–2 win for Trinidad and Tobago).

== Early life and career ==
Ince was born in Arima. He began his footballing career as a defender before converting to become a goalkeeper. As back-up to Michael McComie he played in goal against the then Soviet Union when Trinidad and Tobago qualified for the 1991 FIFA World Youth Championship held in Portugal, although the tournament did not go too well for his team which conceded a total of 12 goals in three group matches.

Ince began his playing career with the Chaguaramas-based club Defence Force, where he quickly established himself as a promising young goalkeeper. In 1997, he was named the Trinidad and Tobago Football Federation's Player of the Year. He was named the Best Goalkeeper at the Caribbean Cup in 1997, 1998, 1999, and 2001.

== Career ==
In 1999, Ince went on trial to the Welsh club Wrexham (who play in the English Football League). Although he played well whilst on trial, the club could not afford to offer him a contract. However, in September of the same year he was offered a contract by Crewe Alexandra, which was accepted by Ince.

Ince spent most of his first two seasons at Crewe as understudy to Jason Kearton, the exception being a one-month loan spell at Dundee, during which time he did not actually play. After returning to Crewe in November 2000 he was placed on the transfer list, the only club who actively tried to sign him was Wrexham, whose bid failed due to a lack of funds. He was removed from the transfer list in the summer of 2001 when Kearton left the club, Ince went on to establish himself as Crewe's first-choice goalkeeper during the 2000–01 season.

After playing in over 200 games for the club, Ince left Crewe in the summer of 2005 following the expiry of his contract. He signed for fellow Championship side Coventry City on a Bosman transfer. He failed to establish himself as a first-choice with the club, serving as understudy to successive loan signings Stephen Bywater and Márton Fülöp.

Following Trinidad and Tobago's qualification for the 2006 World Cup, Ince made it publicly known that he wanted to leave Coventry on loan to play first-team football. He has stated that without this his place in the Trinidad and Tobago squad for the tournament would be jeopardised; although he was no longer his country's first choice goalkeeper, the tournament perhaps represented his last realistic chance of appearing at the World Cup.

In July 2006, Ince signed for Walsall following a successful trial spell. Ince received a ten-day ban from FIFA in October 2006 after Walsall withdrew him from the Trinidad and Tobago squad without permission. He became Walsall's first choice goalkeeper and received the League One player of the Month award in November.

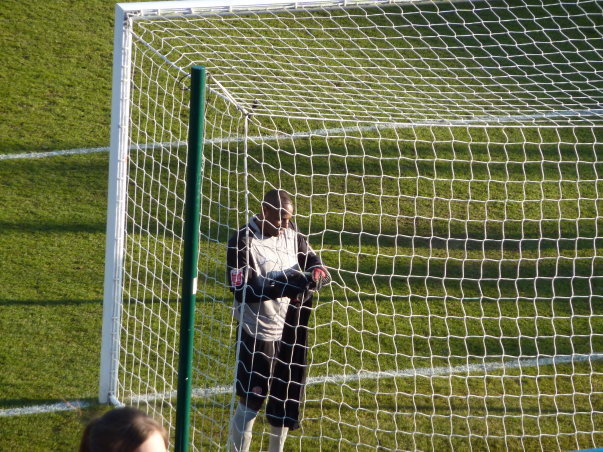
Ince during a game for Walsall

In an interview with Walsall's official website, Ince stated that he saw the move to Walsall as the springboard to win further international caps, and had indeed regained his spot as Trinidad and Tobago's first-choice goalkeeper following the retirement of Shaka Hislop and the unavailability of injury-prone Kelvin Jack, who were ahead of him in the pecking order at the World Cup. But following Trinidad & Tobago's failure to qualify for the 2010 FIFA World Cup, Ince had since been considering retiring from international football, stating that it wouldn't be practical to continue playing friendlies and that he wouldn't realistically be around for the 2014 campaign.

Ince was named in the PFA League Two Team of the Year for the 2006–07 season, and also named Walsall's Player of the Season for the 2008–09 season. Ince had become a favourite with the Walsall fans for his numerous displays that have saved the team from losing.

On 6 May 2010, Ince had formally announced his retirement from professional football and also stated his intention to return to Trinidad to work with younger goalkeepers, but returned to professional football with Trinidadian outfit Ma Pau SC and even spoke about a possible return to International football with Trinidad and Tobago.

After a successful stint with Ma Pau as Player/Assistant Coach where he won the Toyota Classic and was named Player of the Tournament, Ince signed a two-year deal with Pro League side T&TEC FC as Player/Goalkeeping coach.

== Personal life ==
As a member of the squad that competed at the 2006 FIFA World Cup in Germany, Ince was awarded the Chaconia Medal (Gold Class), the second highest state decoration of Trinidad and Tobago.

== Honours ==
Crewe Alexandra

- Football League Second Division runner-up: 2002–03

Walsall

- Football League Two: 2006–07

Individual

- PFA Team of the Year: 2006–07 Football League Two
- Walsall Player of the Year: 2008–09
- Chaconia Medal Gold Class: 2006
