= Stella Abidh =

Trinidad and Tobago physician

Stella Piari Abidh (1903–1989) was a Trinidad and Tobago public health physician. She served as the Medical Officer of Health for San Fernando and as medical supervisor of schools in south Trinidad. She is believed to be the first Indo-Trinidadian woman to become a doctor.

== Early life and education ==
Stella Piari Abidh was born in Charlieville Chaguanas. She was the daughter of Clarence Carmichael Abidh, headmaster of the Canadian Mission Indian school in Charlieville, and member of the Legislative Council. Her mother died when she was young. She was educated at Naparima Girls' High School in San Fernando; a school established following changing attitude of Christians towards girls' early marriages. There, she was the first student to complete the Junior Cambridge Certificate, and later at Saint Joseph's Convent in Port of Spain. After rejecting the marriage arranged for her by her grandmother, Abidh became a schoolteacher.

Inspired by the story of Rosalie Sanowar, the first Indo-Trinidadian woman to become a nurse, Abidh applied to study nursing. In response to this, her father suggested she become a doctor. When he approached the head of the Presbyterian Church in Trinidad for help to send her to Canada to study medicine, he was told: "I would not send a daughter to do medicine. Indian girls are morally weak and would not be able to stand those pressures". After making her promise not to be "one of those Indian people", her father sent her to Canada to study medicine. She received a medical degree from the University of Toronto and the Licentiate of the Medical Council of Canada in 1930.

== Career ==
Abidh is believed to be the first Indo-Trinidadian woman to become a doctor. (Note: Patricia Mohammed (2016) says of Abidh: "to my knowledge, the first Indian female physician in Trinidad".) Abidh served as the Medical Officer of Health for San Fernando, and served as medical supervisor of schools in south Trinidad. She specialised in public health after observing that she was primarily treating preventable diseases, and was particularly active in efforts to eradicate hookworm infection. She played a leading role in successful efforts to contain yellow fever outbreaks in Trinidad and Tobago in 1954 and 1979.

== Impact ==
In their book Post-Colonial Trinidad, British academics Colin and Gillian Clarke called Abidh "arguably [one of the two] most prominent Indian women professionals of their generation". Corinne Averille McKnight, former ambassador of Trinidad and Tobago to the United States, listed Abidh among a small group of "pioneer women of [Trinidad and Tobago]" and noted her contribution as a "medical doctor, great humanitarian, and social worker".

== Personal life ==
Abidh's relationship with labour leader Adrian Cola Rienzi produced several children but because they were not married, the children were given the surname Waugh and were raised in Canada.

== Honours and awards ==
Abidh was awarded the Chaconia Medal (Gold) in 1988 and the Public Service Medal of Merit (Gold) in 1971 and was featured on a postage stamp issued by Trinidad and Tobago in 1980.
