= Cornell Glen =

Trinidadian footballer

Cornell Glen CM
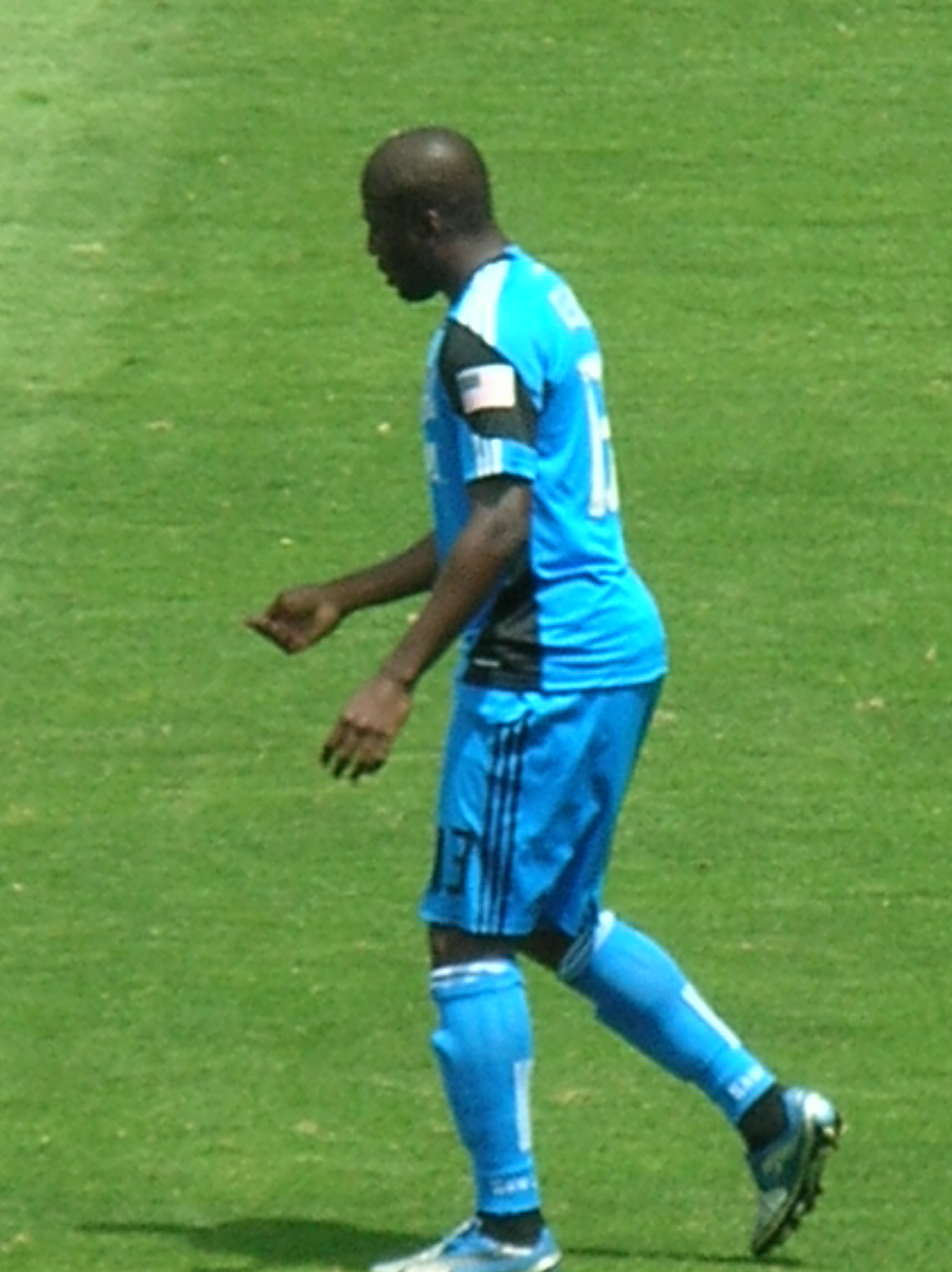
- Glen with Earthquakes in 2010

Personal information
- Full name: Cornell Glen
- Date of birth: 21 October 1980 (age 46)
- Place of birth: Port of Spain, Trinidad and Tobago
- Height: 1.75 m (5 ft 9 in)
- Position: Striker

Senior career*
Years	Team	Apps	(Gls)
1999–2000	FUTGOF		
2000–2001	Sanjoanense	37	(9)
2002–2004	San Juan Jabloteh		
2004	MetroStars	18	(6)
2005	FC Dallas	0	(0)
2005	Columbus Crew	22	(4)
2006	Colorado Rapids	1	(0)
2006	LA Galaxy	4	(2)
2007	San Juan Jabloteh	24	(13)
2008	Ma Pau	26	(14)
2008–2009	San Juan Jabloteh	26	(13)
2009–2010	San Jose Earthquakes	33	(5)
2011	Caledonia AIA	48	(26)
2011–2012	Sông Lam Nghệ An	0	(0)
2012–2013	North East Stars		(16)
2013–2016	Shillong Lajong	38	(30)
2014	→ NorthEast United (loan)	0	(0)
2016	→ Mohun Bagan (loan)	16	(11)
2016–2017	Ozone	0	(0)
2017	→ Bengaluru FC (loan)	0	(0)
2017	UTT		

International career
2002–2017	Trinidad and Tobago	72	(24)
- * Club domestic league appearances and goals

Cornell Glen CM (born 21 October 1981) is a Trinidadian former professional footballer who played as a forward.

== Club career ==
Glen began his professional career in 1999 with Trinidadian club FUTGOF. After two years with FUTGOF, Glen moved to Portugal, where he played for Sanjoanense. After playing slightly over a season there, he returned to Trinidad and Tobago, where he joined San Juan Jabloteh. Glen dominated the league with Jabloteh, leading the club to two consecutive league championships in 2002 and 2003, while registering 12 and 26 goals in the respective seasons.

After scoring a hat trick in a CONCACAF Champions Cup game against the Chicago Fire on 17 March 2004, Glen was bought by the MetroStars of Major League Soccer. In his first season Glen made a significant impact, registering six goals and two assists as he competed for playing time on a very crowded MetroStars front line.

Glen was traded to FC Dallas after the year for a first round pick in the 2005 MLS SuperDraft, but as the club had also acquired Carlos Ruiz he could not find any playing time among Dallas's other options at striker. Glen was traded to the Columbus Crew early in the 2005 season for a future draft pick without ever suiting up for Dallas. After scoring four goals for the Crew, he was on the move again after the season, being dealt to the Colorado Rapids for Ritchie Kotschau. Glen played only one game for the Rapids—the opener of the 2006 season—before being traded to the Los Angeles Galaxy.

In his Galaxy debut he scored two late goals in the "SuperClasico" against Chivas USA from Landon Donovan assists, which turned around the 1–0 score and gave the "sash" a 2–1 win. His late-game heroics made Glen an instant fan favorite in Los Angeles.

Following the 2006 FIFA World Cup Glen returned to action with the Galaxy in U.S. Open Cup play against the Colorado Rapids, but aggravated an injury he suffered during the World Cup, and missed the rest of the season. He was waived by the Galaxy during the 2007 pre-season.

After briefly returning to Trinidad to play for San Juan Jabloteh in 2007, Glen trialled Leeds United from the English Coca-Cola Football League One in January 2008, but was not offered a contract.

Glen went on trial with Major League Soccer side San Jose Earthquakes in May 2009 and successfully signed a one-year deal with the club shortly thereafter. He scored his first goal for San Jose on 30 May 2009 against Real Salt Lake and ended the 2009 season with four goals as San Jose struggled in the standings. Much of Glen's time with the Earthquakes was plagued by injuries, and following a statistically disappointing 2010 season his contract was not renewed by the San Jose club.

He joined Caledonia AIA in April 2011. Glen agreed to a six-month deal with Sông Lam Nghệ An of the V-League in December 2011. Upon return to Trinidad and Tobago, he signed with North East Stars for the 2012–13 season. On 17 June 2013, Glen signed for an I-League club Shillong Lajong for 2 years. He scored 16 goals for the club in 2014–15 season.

Glen signed with Mohun Bagan A.C. on 7 October 2015. On 8 January 2016, he made his debut, scoring twice in a 3–1 win over Aizawl.

In the 2015–16 season of I-League, he emerged as the top goal scorer of Mohun Bagan with 11 goals.

After a season with Mohun Bagan, Glen signed with Bangalore Super Division outfit Ozone FC from Bangalore on 2 August 2016.

== International career ==
Glen (whose name is often misspelled "Glenn") has been a regular for Trinidad and Tobago since 2002, and was named in the squad for the 2006 FIFA World Cup.

Glen appeared in all three of Trinidad & Tobago's games at the World Cup. His shot nearly upset Sweden in the Caribbean team's historic World Cup debut which ended in a draw. Trinidad & Tobago were eliminated in the first round after losing to England and Paraguay, but Glen's performances during the tournament earned him praise and recognition.

=== International Goals ===
Scores and results list Trinidad and Tobago's goal tally first, score column indicates score after each Glen goal.

List of international goals scored by Cornell Glen
No.	Date	Venue	Opponent	Score	Result	Competition
1	10 February 2004	Bermuda National Stadium, Prospect, Bermuda	Bermuda	1-0	1-0	Friendly
2	12 February 2004	Bermuda National Stadium, Prospect, Bermuda	Bermuda	2-1	2-2	Friendly
3	10 October 2004	Manny Ramjohn Stadium, Marabella, Trinidad and Tobago	Saint Kitts and Nevis	3-1	5-1	2006 FIFA World Cup qualification
4	24 November 2004	Marvin Lee Stadium, Macoya, Trinidad and Tobago	Puerto Rico	1-0	5-0	2005 Caribbean Cup qualification
5	24 November 2004	Marvin Lee Stadium, Macoya, Trinidad and Tobago	Puerto Rico	2-0	5-0	2005 Caribbean Cup qualification
6	24 November 2004	Marvin Lee Stadium, Macoya, Trinidad and Tobago	Puerto Rico	3-0	5-0	2005 Caribbean Cup qualification
7	28 November 2004	Larry Gomes Stadium, Arima, Trinidad and Tobago	Suriname	1-0	1-0	2005 Caribbean Cup qualification
8	3 February 2005	Hasely Crawford Stadium, Port-of-Spain, Trinidad and Tobago	Haiti		2-1	Friendly
9	22 February 2005	Barbados National Stadium, Bridgetown, Barbados	Cuba	1-0	1-2	2005 Caribbean Cup
10	24 February 2005	Barbados National Stadium, Bridgetown, Barbados	Barbados	2-0	3-2	2005 Caribbean Cup
11	9 July 2005	Orange Bowl, Miami, United States of America	Panama	2-1	2-2	2005 CONCACAF Gold Cup
12	30 July 2008	Marvin Lee Stadium, Macoya, Trinidad and Tobago	Haiti	2-0	2-0	Friendly
13	14 August 2008	RFK Memorial Stadium, Washington D.C., United States of America	El Salvador	1-0	3-1	Friendly
14	14 August 2008	RFK Memorial Stadium, Washington D.C., United States of America	El Salvador	3-1	3-1	Friendly
15	20 August 2008	Estadio Pedro Marrero, Havana, Cuba	Cuba	3-0	3-1	2010 FIFA World Cup qualification
16	3 September 2008	Hasely Crawford Stadium, Port-of-Spain, Trinidad and Tobago	Guyana	2-0	3-0	Friendly
17	8 October 2008	Hasely Crawford Stadium, Port-of-Spain, Trinidad and Tobago	Dominican Republic	5-0	9-0	Friendly
18	8 October 2008	Hasely Crawford Stadium, Port-of-Spain, Trinidad and Tobago	Dominican Republic	6-0	9-0	Friendly
19	8 October 2008	Hasely Crawford Stadium, Port-of-Spain, Trinidad and Tobago	Dominican Republic	7-0	9-0	Friendly
20	5 November 2008	Marvin Lee Stadium, Macoya, Trinidad and Tobago	Antigua and Barbuda	1-1	3-2	2008 Caribbean Cup qualification
21	3 December 2008	National Stadium, Kingston, Jamaica	Grenada	1-1	1-2	2008 Caribbean Cup
22	18 March 2009	Manny Ramjohn Stadium, Marabella, Trinidad and Tobago	Panama	1-0	1-0	Friendly
23	12 August 2009	Hasely Crawford Stadium, Port-of-Spain, Trinidad and Tobago	El Salvador	1-0	1-0	2010 FIFA World Cup qualification
24	30 December 2016	Nicaragua National Football Stadium, Managua, Nicaragua	Nicaragua	1-1	3-1	Friendly

== Personal life ==
As a member of the squad that competed at the 2006 FIFA World Cup in Germany, Glen was awarded the Chaconia Medal (Gold Class), the second highest state decoration of Trinidad and Tobago.

== Honours ==
Mohun Bagan

- Federation Cup (India): 2015–16

Bengaluru FC

- Federation Cup (India): 2016–17

Individual

- Chaconia Medal Gold Class
- I-League top scorer: 2013–14
