= Trinidad and Tobago at the CONCACAF Gold Cup =

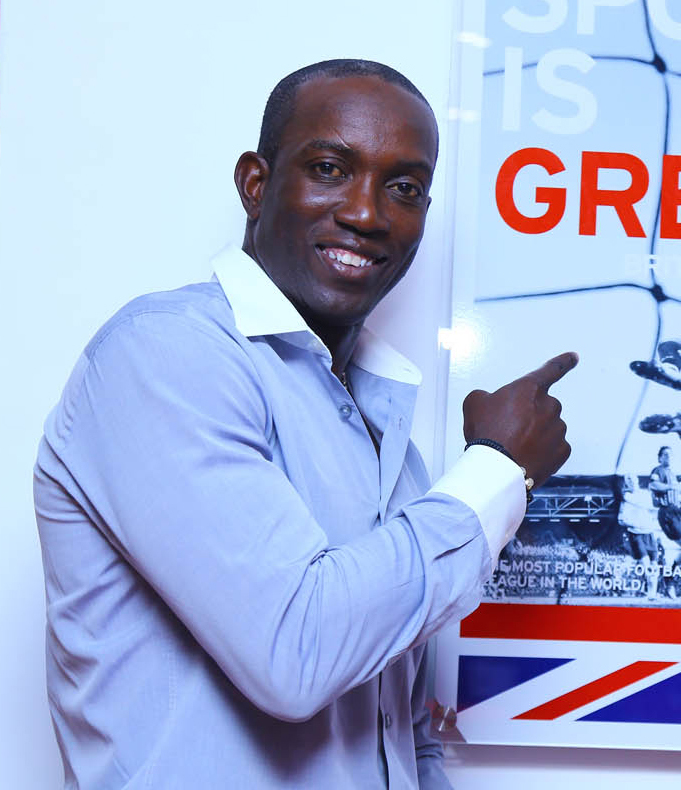
In 2000, Trinidad and Tobago's star-forward Dwight Yorke was voted into the tournament's Best XI alongside team mate Russell Latapy. Trinidad and Tobago placed 3rd in that tournament, their best result in the Gold Cup era.

The CONCACAF Gold Cup is North America's major tournament in senior men's football and determines the continental champion. Until 1989, the tournament was known as CONCACAF Championship. It is currently held every two years. From 1996 to 2005, nations from other confederations have regularly joined the tournament as invitees. In earlier editions, the continental championship was held in different countries, but since the inception of the Gold Cup in 1991, the United States are constant hosts or co-hosts.

From 1973 to 1989, the tournament doubled as the confederation's World Cup qualification. CONCACAF's representative team at the FIFA Confederations Cup was decided by a play-off between the winners of the last two tournament editions in 2015 via the CONCACAF Cup, but was then discontinued along with the Confederations Cup.

Since the inaugural tournament in 1963, the Gold Cup was held 28 times and has been won by seven different nations, most often by Mexico (13 titles).

In terms of total points earned, Trinidad and Tobago are the second-most successful Caribbean nation in the history of CONCACAF continental championships after Haiti, but unlike them have never actually won a title. Haiti won the championship in 1973, with Trinidad and Tobago as runners-up – the closest the Trinidadians ever came to a tournament victory themselves.

== Overall record ==
CONCACAF Championship & Gold Cup record										Qualification record					
Year	Result	Position	Pld	W	D	L	GF	GA	Squad	Pld	W	D	L	GF	GA
(El Salvador) 1963	Did not enter									Did not enter					
(Guatemala) 1965	Withdrew									Withdrew					
(Honduras) 1967	Round-robin	4th	5	2	0	3	6	10	Squad	4	2	1	1	7	7
(Costa Rica) 1969	Round-robin	5th	5	1	1	3	4	12	Squad	Qualified automatically					
(Trinidad and Tobago) 1971	Round-robin	5th	5	1	2	2	6	12	Squad	Qualified as hosts					
(Haiti) 1973	Round-robin	2nd	5	3	0	2	11	4	Squad	4	3	1	0	16	4
(Mexico) 1977	Did not qualify									6	2	2	2	10	9
(Honduras) 1981	Did not qualify									4	1	2	1	1	2
1985	Group stage	7th	4	0	1	3	2	7	Squad	Qualified automatically					
1989	Round-robin	3rd	8	3	3	2	7	5	Squad	4	2	2	0	6	1
(United States) 1991	Group stage	5th	3	1	0	2	3	4	Squad	5	3	0	2	12	5
(Mexico) (United States) 1993	Did not qualify									5	2	1	2	10	10
(United States) 1996	Group stage	7th	2	0	0	2	4	6	Squad	5	4	0	1	21	3
(United States) 1998	Group stage	6th	2	1	0	1	5	5	Squad	4	2	1	1	9	3
(United States) 2000	Third place	3rd	4	2	0	2	6	8	Squad	5	4	0	1	18	6
(United States) 2002	Group stage	10th	2	0	1	1	1	2	Squad	5	4	0	1	13	3
(Mexico) (United States) 2003	Did not qualify									7	3	0	4	8	9
(United States) 2005	Group stage	10th	3	0	2	1	3	5	Squad	10	7	0	3	22	8
(United States) 2007	Group stage	11th	3	0	1	2	2	5	Squad	5	3	1	1	13	6
(United States) 2009	Did not qualify									6	3	2	1	11	8
(United States) 2011	Did not qualify									6	4	0	2	13	6
(United States) 2013	Quarter-finals	6th	4	1	1	2	4	5	Squad	11	6	3	2	23	7
(Canada) (United States) 2015	Quarter-finals	5th	4	2	2	0	10	6	Squad	7	5	2	0	16	5
(United States) 2017	Did not qualify									4	1	0	3	8	8
(Costa Rica) (Jamaica) (United States) 2019	Group stage	14th	3	0	1	2	1	9	Squad	Qualified automatically					
(United States) 2021	Group stage	12th	3	0	2	1	1	3	Squad	6	1	3	2	10	11
(Canada) (United States) 2023	Group stage	13th	3	1	0	2	4	10	Squad	6	4	1	1	12	4
(Canada) (United States) 2025	Group stage	11th	3	0	2	1	2	7	Squad	6	3	2	1	11	8
Total	Runners-up	19/28	71	18	19	34	82	125		125	69	22	32	280	133

== Match overview ==
Tournament	Round	Opponent	Score	Venue
(Honduras) 1967	Final round	Honduras	0–1	Tegucigalpa
(Honduras) 1967	Final round	Haiti	3–2	Tegucigalpa
(Honduras) 1967	Final round	Mexico	0–4	Tegucigalpa
(Honduras) 1967	Final round	Guatemala	0–2	Tegucigalpa
(Honduras) 1967	Final round	Nicaragua	3–1	Tegucigalpa
(Costa Rica) 1969	Final round	Guatemala	0–2	San José
(Costa Rica) 1969	Final round	Jamaica	3–2	San José
(Costa Rica) 1969	Final round	Netherlands Antilles	1–3	San José
(Costa Rica) 1969	Final round	Costa Rica	0–5	San José
(Costa Rica) 1969	Final round	Mexico	0–0	San José
(Trinidad and Tobago) 1971	Final round	Honduras	1–1	Port-of-Spain
(Trinidad and Tobago) 1971	Final round	Mexico	0–2	Port-of-Spain
(Trinidad and Tobago) 1971	Final round	Haiti	0–6	Port-of-Spain
(Trinidad and Tobago) 1971	Final round	Cuba	2–2	Port-of-Spain
(Trinidad and Tobago) 1971	Final round	Costa Rica	3–1	Port-of-Spain
(Haiti) 1973	Final round	Honduras	1–2	Port-au-Prince
(Haiti) 1973	Final round	Haiti	1–2	Port-au-Prince
(Haiti) 1973	Final round	Guatemala	1–0	Port-au-Prince
(Haiti) 1973	Final round	Mexico	4–0	Port-au-Prince
(Haiti) 1973	Final round	Netherlands Antilles	4–0	Port-au-Prince
1985	Group stage	Costa Rica	0–3	San José, Costa Rica
1985	Group stage	Costa Rica	1–1	San José, Costa Rica
1985	Group stage	United States	1–2	St. Louis, United States
1985	Group stage	United States	0–1	Torrance, United States
1989	Final round	United States	1–1	Torrance, United States
1989	Final round	Costa Rica	1–1	Port-of-Spain, Trinidad and Tobago
1989	Final round	Costa Rica	0–1	San José, Costa Rica
1989	Final round	El Salvador	2–0	Port-of-Spain, Trinidad and Tobago
1989	Final round	El Salvador	0–0	Tegucigalpa, Honduras
1989	Final round	Guatemala	1–0	Guatemala City, Guatemala
1989	Final round	Guatemala	2–1	Port-of-Spain, Trinidad and Tobago
1989	Final round	United States	0–1	Port-of-Spain, Trinidad and Tobago
(United States) 1991	Group stage	United States	1–2	Pasadena
(United States) 1991	Group stage	Costa Rica	2–1	Pasadena
(United States) 1991	Group stage	Guatemala	0–1	Los Angeles
(United States) 1996	Group stage	El Salvador	2–3	Anaheim
(United States) 1996	Group stage	United States	2–3	Anaheim
(United States) 1998	Group stage	Honduras	3–1	Oakland
(United States) 1998	Group stage	Mexico	2–4	Oakland
(United States) 2000	Group stage	Mexico	0–4	San Diego
(United States) 2000	Group stage	Guatemala	4–2	Los Angeles
(United States) 2000	Quarter-finals	Costa Rica	2–1 (a.e.t.)	San Diego
(United States) 2000	Semi-finals	Canada	0–1	Los Angeles
(United States) 2002	Group stage	Costa Rica	1–1	Miami
(United States) 2002	Group stage	Martinique	0–1	Miami
(United States) 2005	Group stage	Honduras	1–1	Miami
(United States) 2005	Group stage	Panama	2–2	Miami
(United States) 2005	Group stage	Colombia	0–2	Miami
(United States) 2007	Group stage	El Salvador	1–2	Carson
(United States) 2007	Group stage	United States	0–2	Carson
(United States) 2007	Group stage	Guatemala	1–1	Foxboro
(United States) 2013	Group stage	El Salvador	2–2	Harrison
(United States) 2013	Group stage	Haiti	0–2	Miami Gardens
(United States) 2013	Group stage	Honduras	2–0	Houston
(United States) 2013	Quarter-finals	Mexico	0–1	Atlanta
(United States) (Canada) 2015	Group stage	Guatemala	3–1	Chicago
(United States) (Canada) 2015	Group stage	Cuba	2–0	Glendale
(United States) (Canada) 2015	Group stage	Mexico	4–4	Charlotte
(United States) (Canada) 2015	Quarter-finals	Panama	1–1 (5–6 p)	East Rutherford
(United States) (Costa Rica) (Jamaica) 2019	Group stage	Panama	0–2	Saint Paul
(United States) (Costa Rica) (Jamaica) 2019	Group stage	United States	0–6	Cleveland
(United States) (Costa Rica) (Jamaica) 2019	Group stage	Guyana	1–1	Kansas City
(United States) 2021	Group stage	Mexico	0–0	Arlington
(United States) 2021	Group stage	El Salvador	0–2	Dallas
(United States) 2021	Group stage	Guatemala	1–1	Frisco
(United States) (Canada) 2023	Group stage	Saint Kitts and Nevis	3–0	Fort Lauderdale
(United States) (Canada) 2023	Group stage	Jamaica	1–4	St. Louis
(United States) (Canada) 2023	Group stage	United States	0–6	Charlotte
(United States) (Canada) 2025	Group stage	United States	0–5	San Jose
(United States) (Canada) 2025	Group stage	Haiti	1–1	Houston
(United States) (Canada) 2025	Group stage	Saudi Arabia	1–1	Paradise

== Top goalscorers ==
Steve David scored seven goals during the 1973 CONCACAF Championship, which made him sole top scorer of the tournament. He is still Trinidad and Tobago's leading scorer at continental championships and the only Trinidadian to date to win an individual award.

Rank	Player	Goals	Gold Cups
1	Steve David	7	1973
2	Leonson Lewis	4	1989 (2) and 1991 (2)
2	Arnold Dwarika	4	1996 (2) and 2000 (2)
2	Kenwyne Jones	4	2013 (2) and 2015 (2)
5	Everald Cummings	3	1969 (1) and 1973 (2)
5	Russell Latapy	3	1996 (2) and 2000 (1)
5	Stern John	3	1998 (2) and 2002 (1)

The table ignores six goals from unknown scorers of the 1971 tournament.

== See also ==
- Trinidad and Tobago at the FIFA World Cup
