= Therese Mills =

Therese Mills (14 December 1928 – 1 January 2014) was a Trinidad and Tobago journalist who was the first female chief editor of the Trinidad and Tobago Guardian newspaper. In 1993 she founded the highly successful Trinidad and Tobago Newsday newspaper. She won numerous awards including the Chaconia Medal for service to the field of journalism. She was CEO until her death aged 85.

== Biography ==
Mills was born in Woodbrook, Port of Spain, and attended Providence Girls Catholic School. Her first job at the age of 17 was with the Port of Spain Gazette, where she remained for 11 years, as a library assistant and reporter. She subsequently worked at the Trinidad Guardian, where from 1964 to 1970 she was a senior feature writer/reporter, going on to become news editor of the Sunday Guardian (1970–78) and then its editor (1979–90). When in 1989 she became the Trinidad Guardian′s editor-in-chief (until her retirement in 1993), she was the first woman to hold such a post at a national newspaper in Trinidad and Tobago.

Mills was awarded the Hummingbird Medal (Silver) in 1987 and the Chaconia Medal (Gold) in 2012. She won several awards for her contributions to journalism. She was also an author of children's books.
