= Aurtis Whitley =

Trinidadian footballer (born 1977)

Aurtis Whitley CM
Personal information
- Full name: Aurtis Whitley
- Date of birth: 1 May 1977 (age 49)
- Place of birth: Barataria, Trinidad and Tobago
- Height: 1.78 m (5 ft 10 in)
- Position: Midfielder

Senior career*
Years	Team	Apps	(Gls)
1997	Superstar Rangers	0	(0)
1997–1998	Vitoria Setubal	0	(0)
1998–2007	San Juan Jabloteh	22	(9)
2007–2008	W Connection	0	(0)
2008–2009	United Petrotrin		
2010–2011	San Juan Jabloteh		

International career^{‡}
2000–2008	Trinidad and Tobago	41	(2)
- * Club domestic league appearances and goals as of 5 February 2008 ‡ National team caps and goals as of 22 August 2008

Aurtis Whitley CM (born 1 May 1977) is a Trinidad and Tobago former professional footballer who played as a midfielder. He captained the Trinidad and Tobago national team.

As a member of the Trinidad and Tobago squad that competed at the 2006 FIFA World Cup in Germany, Whitley was awarded the Chaconia Medal (Gold Class), the second highest state decoration of Trinidad and Tobago.

== Club career ==
Whitley played for San Juan Jabloteh for nine years in the TT Pro League prior to his contract termination in September 2007 after comments by manager Terry Fenwick regarding the player's attendance at practices. Several days later, he was signed by rival club W Connection where he remains to date (as of July 2008). His previous clubs include Superstar Rangers and Vitoria Setubal.

== International career ==
Whitley made his international debut for the Trinidad and Tobago national team (T&T) on 15 November 2005 in a 2006 FIFA World Cup Qualifier against Panama. He played most of T&T's qualification matches for the 2006 FIFA World Cup in Germany when T&T qualified, its first ever qualification. He played at the World Cup in all of T&T three games. He was absent from the national team for all of 2007 along with other World Cup players due to a dispute over bonuses with the Trinidad and Tobago Football Federation. He returned to the national team as captain for a friendly match against El Salvador in March 2008 and has retained the captain's armband for all games since (as of July 2008).

=== International goals ===
Scores and results list Trinidad and Tobago's goal tally first, score column indicates score after each Whitley goal.

List of international goals scored by Aurtis Whitley
No.	Date	Venue	Opponent	Score	Result	Competition
1	19 November 2003	Hasely Crawford Stadium, Port of Spain, Trinidad and Tobago	Cuba	1–0	2–1	Friendly
2	26 March 2008	Independence Park, Kingston, Jamaica	Jamaica	2–2	2–2	Friendly
