= David Atiba Charles =

Trinidad and Tobago footballer

David Atiba Charles CM
Personal information
- Full name: David Atiba Charles
- Date of birth: 29 September 1977 (age 49)
- Place of birth: Point Fortin, Trinidad and Tobago
- Height: 1.88 m (6 ft 2 in)
- Position: Defender

Senior career*
Years	Team	Apps	(Gls)
1995–1999	Point Fortin Civic		
1999–2006	W Connection		(13)
2006–2007	Glenavon	14	(0)
2007–2008	W Connection	18	(3)
2008	Rochester Rhinos	5	(0)

International career
2003–2006	Trinidad and Tobago	23	(0)
- * Club domestic league appearances and goals

David Atiba Charles CM (born 29 September 1977) is a Trinidadian former professional footballer who played as a defender for several clubs as well as the Trinidad and Tobago national team.

In 2006 he left W Connection to join Northern Irish club Glenavon.

He was a regular for the Trinidad and Tobago national team during his career and was included in their squad for the 2006 FIFA World Cup in Germany. Along with the other players on the 2006 World Cup squad, Charles was awarded the Chaconia Medal.
