= Brent Sancho =

Trinidad and Tobago footballer and politician

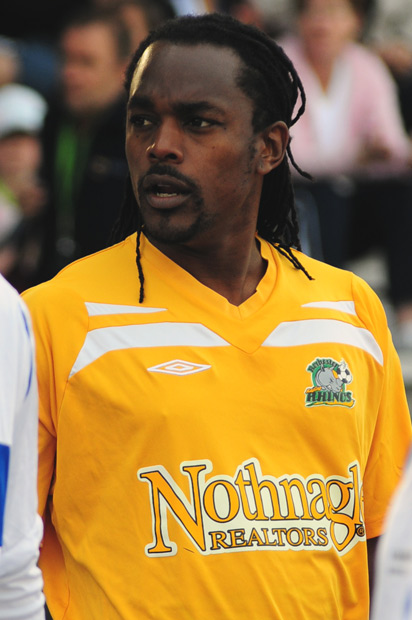
- Sancho in 2009

Personal information
- Full name: Brent Sancho
- Date of birth: 13 March 1977 (age 49)
- Place of birth: Port of Spain, Trinidad and Tobago
- Height: 6 ft 1 in (1.85 m)
- Position: Defender

College career
Years	Team	Apps	(Gls)
1994–1995	Essex Knights		
1996–1997	St. John's Red Storm		

Senior career*
Years	Team	Apps	(Gls)
1998	Brooklyn Italians		
1999	MyPa	1	(0)
1999	Tervarit	18	(7)
1999	Joe Public		
2000	Charleston Battery	20	(1)
2001–2003	Portland Timbers	51	(1)
2002–2003	→ San Juan Jabloteh (loan)	20	(1)
2003–2005	Dundee	48	(2)
2005–2007	Gillingham	42	(2)
2007–2008	Millwall	0	(0)
2008	Ross County	2	(0)
2008	Atlanta Silverbacks	8	(0)
2008	North East Stars	2	(0)
2009	Rochester Rhinos	24	(1)
2010	North East Stars	5	(0)
2021	Royal Wootton Bassett Town	6	(0)

International career
1999–2006	Trinidad and Tobago	43	(0)
- * Club domestic league appearances and goals

Brent Sancho CM (born 13 March 1977) is a Trinidadian former professional football player and politician. In February 2015, he became the Minister of Sport for his home country, Trinidad and Tobago.

== Club career ==
=== College ===
Born in Port of Spain, Sancho spent his college years playing for St. John's University in New York City, where he was part of the school's only National Championship, in 1996.

=== Finland, Scotland and England ===
Sancho then spent most of his early career playing in the United States. Sancho played in Finland in 1999 for MYPA in Veikkausliiga and Tervarit, before joining Dundee in the 2003–04 season. A successful spell in the SPL was followed by a transfer to League One side Gillingham.

In December 2007 Sancho joined Millwall on a month's contract. This was not renewed and he found himself once again without a club until signing for Scottish Football League Division Two champions Ross County, in March 2008 until the end of the 2007–08 season. Sancho went on trial with Wrexham in July 2008 but was not signed by the club.

=== United States ===
On 30 June 2008, the TTFF reported that Sancho had been training with TT Pro League team San Juan Jabloteh and Wrexham in an effort to regain a place with the national team as well as further his professional career. Eventually, Sancho returned to the USA in August 2008, joining the Atlanta Silverbacks and playing in eight matches in the remaining part of the season.

On 26 February 2009, the Rochester Rhinos announced the signing of Sancho to a two-year contract.

== International career ==
Sancho played in all three matches in which Trinidad and Tobago took part in the 2006 FIFA World Cup, thus becoming the first former St. John's player and first current Gillingham player ever to play in a World Cup. In the third match, against Paraguay, he scored an own goal and defeat in this game confirmed Trinidad and Tobago's elimination from the tournament.

On 9 October 2006, Sancho announced his retirement from international football along with 12 others. Speaking at a press conference, Sancho said: "It's not just monetary. They have made certain contractual arrangements which they have now reneged on." This followed a dispute between the World Cup players and the Trinidad and Tobago Football Federation regarding bonuses for playing in the World Cup. The issue went to court in the United Kingdom which ruled in favour of the players. Several of the players subsequently returned to the national team, but Sancho did not play for T&T after the 2006 World Cup. As of February 2015, the legal dispute between the players and the national association was still ongoing.

== Post-playing activities ==
In 2010, Sancho was the owner/coach of the Trinidad and Tobago Professional Football League club North East Stars, before setting up his own team called Central FC.

In 2015, Sancho was appointed Minister of Sport in Trinidad and Tobago.

As of 2021, Sancho was assistant manager of the Anguilla national team.

== Awards ==
As a member of the Trinidad and Tobago squad that competed at the 2006 FIFA World Cup in Germany, Sancho was awarded the Chaconia Medal (Gold Class), the second highest state decoration of Trinidad and Tobago.
