= Collin Samuel =

Trinidad and Tobago footballer

Collin Samuel CM
Personal information
- Full name: Collin Andrew Samuel
- Date of birth: 27 August 1981 (age 45)
- Place of birth: Manzanilla, Trinidad and Tobago
- Height: 5 ft 9 in (1.75 m)
- Positions: Winger; striker

Senior career*
Years	Team	Apps	(Gls)
1998–2000	Doc's Khelwalaas		
2000–2002	San Juan Jabloteh		
2002–2003	Falkirk	34	(11)
2003–2007	Dundee United	116	(14)
2007–2008	Toronto FC	19	(3)
2008–2011	St Johnstone	83	(13)
2011	Luton Town	1	(0)
2012	Arbroath	14	(4)
2012	East Fife	22	(3)
2013–2014	Sauchie		
2014–2016	Guaya United		
2016–2017	Ma Pau Stars		

International career
2002–2009	Trinidad and Tobago	24	(5)
- * Club domestic league appearances and goals

Collin Andrew Samuel CM (born 27 August 1981) is a Trinidad and Tobago former professional footballer who played as a winger or striker. He represented Trinidad and Tobago at senior international level and played in the 2006 World Cup. He played abroad professionally for a number of clubs in Scotland, including Falkirk, Dundee United and St Johnstone, as well as Toronto FC in Canada and Luton Town in England.

== Club career ==
=== Early career ===
Samuel began his career with Doc's Khelwalaas of his native Trinidad, where he played from 1998 to 2000. In 2000, he moved to one of the nation's largest clubs, San Juan Jabloteh, where he played the 2001 and 2002 seasons.

=== Falkirk ===
Samuel moved to Scotland in August 2002 when he was scouted by Simon Lindsay for Falkirk. He scored 16 goals in 42 appearances in his first season for the then-Scottish First Division side, including a first half hat-trick in a 4–0 Scottish Cup victory against Hearts. During his spell with Falkirk, he had an unsuccessful trial with Everton in the English Premier League.

=== Dundee United ===
Samuel moved to Scottish Premier League club Dundee United on 11 July 2003 for £100,000.

Samuel was not as prolific at Tannadice, scoring just 15 goals in total during his four seasons there. Despite scoring on his debut, Samuel managed just one more all season and failed to score at all during 2004–05. Samuel was part of the Dundee United match day squad which participated in the Scottish Cup final in season 2004–05 against Celtic. Despite losing that cup final 1–0, the team still qualified for the following season's UEFA Cup in which Samuel scored against Finnish team, MyPa, at Tannadice in the second leg of the qualifying round tie. Finding his form somewhat that particular season, he managed seven goals, including three in four games during December. In 2006–07, however, Samuel scored five times for United. Generally starting from the bench, he was frequently used as a right midfielder or as a forward. Samuel was told he was free to leave Dundee United at the end of the 2006–07 season, with interest shown by Major League Soccer side Toronto FC and Scottish First Division side, St Johnstone. Samuel subsequently played his last game for Dundee United in their final game of the 2006–07 season, a 0–0 draw at home to Motherwell.

=== Toronto FC ===
After being released by Dundee United, media speculation increasingly linked him with moves to a team in the Major League Soccer and the aforementioned St Johnstone. Samuel eventually signed for MLS side Toronto FC, during which time he started every game for the Canadian club, making 19 appearances and scoring three goals for the injury-racked club in their inaugural season. He was released from Toronto FC in April 2008 for personal reasons, with the club allowed a limited number of international players on their roster.

=== St Johnstone ===
Samuel then signed a two-year deal with Scottish First Division side St Johnstone on 6 May 2008 where he proceeded to play no small part in the campaign that led to promotion back to the Scottish Premier League for the 2009–10 season.

Despite being injured for half of the season in St Johnstone's return to the SPL in 2009–10, he still managed seven SPL goals plus one in the cup. He has signed a one-year contract for the 2010–11 campaign, scoring three goals in 36 appearances over the season. He was released at the end of his contract in May 2011.

=== Later career ===
Samuel was signed on 31 August 2011, the transfer deadline day, by Luton Town of the English Conference Premier, but left the club by mutual consent after playing one game.

Following an unsuccessful trial with Livingston, Samuel signed for Scottish Second Division club Arbroath on 20 January 2012 until the end of the 2011–12 season. In the summer of 2012, Samuel moved to East Fife, another Second Division club until the end of the season.

In August 2013, Samuel had a successful trial with Junior outfit Sauchie and signed a contract for the 2013–14 season.

In 2015 he became James Baird's player/assistant manager at Guaya United. In February 2016, he joined North East Stars as a player-coach

Samuel returned to Scotland for work and joined Mill AFC as player/coach.

== International career ==
Samuel played for the Trinidad and Tobago national team, having made his debut on 11 January 2002. He played for the team in the 2002 CONCACAF Gold Cup and was called up to the 2006 World Cup squad. He started the opening group match against Sweden and helped the team earn a goalless draw.

As a member of the squad that competed at the 2006 FIFA World Cup in Germany, Samuel was awarded the Chaconia Medal (Gold Class), the second highest state decoration of Trinidad and Tobago.

== Career statistics ==
Appearances and goals by club, season and competition
Club	Season	League			National Cup		League Cup		Continental		Other		Total	
Club	Season	Division	Apps	Goals	Apps	Goals	Apps	Goals	Apps	Goals	Apps	Goals	Apps	Goals
Falkirk	2002–03	Scottish First Division	33	11	4	4	3	1	–		–		40	16
Dundee United	2003–04	Scottish Premier League	26	2	1	0	2	0	–		–		29	2
Dundee United	2004–05	Scottish Premier League	18	0	3	0	3	0	–		–		24	0
Dundee United	2005–06	Scottish Premier League	35	7	1	0	1	0	1	1	–		38	8
Dundee United	2006–07	Scottish Premier League	37	5	2	0	2	0	–		–		41	5
Dundee United	Total		116	14	7	0	8	0	1	1	0	0	132	15
Toronto	2007	Major League Soccer	18	3							–		18	3
Toronto	2008	Major League Soccer	1	0							–		1	0
Toronto	Total		19	3	0	0	0	0	0	0	0	0	19	3
St Johnstone	2008–09	Scottish First Division	28	6	1	0	1	0	–		–		30	6
St Johnstone	2009–10	Scottish Premier League	27	5	0	0	1	2	–		–		28	7
St Johnstone	2010–11	Scottish Premier League	28	2	5	1	3	0	–		–		36	3
St Johnstone	Total		83	13	6	1	5	2	0	0	0	0	94	16
Luton Town	2011–12	Conference Premier	1	0	0	0	–		–		–		1	0
Arbroath	2011–12	Scottish Second Division	13	4	0	0	0	0	–		–		13	4
East Fife	2012–13	Scottish Second Division	22	3	0	0	0	0	–		5 (Note: Four appearances in Scottish Second Division play-offs; one appearance, one goal in Scottish Challenge Cup)	1	27	4
Career total			287	48	17	5	16	3	1	1	5	1	326	58

== Honours ==
San Juan Jabloteh

- First Citizens Cup: 2000

Falkirk

- Scottish First Division: 2002–03
- Stirlingshire Cup: 2002–03

Dundee United

- Scottish Cup Runner-up: 2004–05
- Forfarshire Cup: 2004–05

St Johnstone

- Scottish First Division: 2008–09

Arbroath

- Scottish Second Division: Runner-up 2011–12

Sauchie Juniors

- East of Scotland Cup: 2013–14

Individual

- Chaconia Medal Gold Class: 2006
