= Jorge Núñez (footballer, born 1978) =

Paraguayan footballer

Personal information
- Full name: Jorge Martín Núñez Mendoza
- Date of birth: 22 January 1978 (age 48)
- Place of birth: Asunción, Paraguay
- Height: 1.76 m (5 ft 9 in)
- Position: Left-back

Senior career*
Years	Team	Apps	(Gls)
1996–1999	Cerro Porteño	42	(5)
2000–2001	Club Guaraní	37	(2)
2002–2003	Cerro Porteño	32	(3)
2003–2004	Banfield	34	(1)
2004–2005	Arsenal de Sarandí	34	(2)
2005	Racing Club	8	(0)
2005–2006	Estudiantes	11	(0)
2007–2008	Cerro Porteño	54	(3)
2008–2010	Rosario Central	11	(0)
2009–2010	→ Chacarita Juniors (loan)	16	(0)
2010–2011	Rubio Ñu	35	(2)
2011	Independiente FBC	13	(1)
2012	General Caballero ZC	24	(2)

International career
2003–2007	Paraguay	23	(1)
- * Club domestic league appearances and goals

Jorge Martín Núñez Mendoza (born 22 January 1978) is a Paraguayan former footballer who played as a defender.

He scored 1 goal in 18 caps for Paraguay, as of July 2007. He started his career in Club Guaraní and then moved to Cerro Porteño. Afterwards, he played for several Argentine teams such as Banfield, Arsenal de Sarandí and Racing Club. Between 2005 and 2006, he played for Estudiantes de La Plata.

He had an opportunity to have a trial for Sheffield United at the start of the 2006–2007 season of the Premier League but opted against it as he was called up for international duty.

In 2007 Núñez returned to Paraguay to play for Cerro Porteño. In July 2008 he signed a contract with the Argentine team Rosario Central. In August 2009 he was loaned to Chacarita Juniors.

On 12 July 2010, Rubio Ñu signed him to improve the squad.
