= Chaconia Medal =

State decoration of Trinidad and Tobago

- Type: Three class long and meritorious service decoration
- Awarded for: "...long and meritorious service to Trinidad and Tobago tending to promote the national welfare or strengthen the community spirit."
- Presented by: Trinidad and Tobago
- Eligibility: Nationals and Non-Nationals
- Post-nominals: CM
- Status: Currently awarded
- Established: 1969
- Final award: 2022
- Ribbon bar of the award

Precedence
- Next (higher): Order of the Republic of Trinidad and Tobago
- Next (lower): Hummingbird Medal

The Chaconia Medal (abbreviated C.M. or CM) is the second highest state decoration of the Republic of Trinidad and Tobago. Established in 1969, the medal honours long and meritorious service to promote national welfare or community spirit. It is awarded in three classes: gold, silver and bronze. The medal may only be awarded to ten individuals annually.
