= 2006 FIFA World Cup Group A =

Group A of the 2006 FIFA World Cup was one of eight groups in the opening round of the tournament. The group featured four teams, competition hosts Germany, Costa Rica, Poland and Ecuador. Play began on 9 June with the first game of the tournament between Germany and Costa Rica, with the former attaining a 4–2 victory in the highest scoring opening game in World Cup history since the competition introduced a single game opener. Later the same day, Poland and Ecuador faced each other, with Ecuador winning 2–0. On 14 June, Germany secured their second victory of the competition, defeating Poland 1–0 following Oliver Neuville's injury time goal. The following day, Ecuador defeated Costa Rica 3–0 to guarantee both they and Germany would advance to the round of 16.

The final set of matches was played on 20 June 2006. Germany and Ecuador contested the top place in the group, with the hosts winning 3–0. With both sides already eliminated, Poland defeated Costa Rica 2–1 to claim their only victory of the competition. Ecuador were eliminated in the following round by England while Germany reached the semi-finals before being defeated by eventual winners Italy. Germany finished third after beating Portugal in the match for third place.

== Background ==
Group A was the first of eight groups to start play at the 2006 FIFA World Cup in Germany. The competition consisted of 32 competitors, split into eight groups of four teams. The sides would play each other on a round-robin basis with the top two teams in each group advancing to the round of 16.

As hosts, three-time World Cup winners Germany qualified automatically for the tournament and were placed into Group A. Manager Jürgen Klinsmann had been appointed in 2004, but due to qualifying as hosts, had yet to take charge of his side in a competitive fixture. His team were considered one of the favourites to win the competition with bookmakers offering odds of around 13/2, but had received criticism in the country, notably from Bayern Munich general manager Uli Hoeneß who had labelled the side "a disaster". CONCACAF members Costa Rica endured a poor start to qualifying, narrowly avoiding an upset defeat against Cuba in the second qualifying round, before appointing Alexandre Guimarães as manager midway through the stage. They qualified for the tournament after finishing third in their qualification round, reaching the finals for the third time in their history. However, they were classed as rank outsiders to win the competition, with odds as high as 500/1 being offered.

To provide an even number of teams for the playoff bracket, the two teams from the UEFA qualification groups who had finished second in their group with the best record automatically gained qualification to the World Cup. Poland, who finished second in UEFA qualification Group 6 behind England, were one of the teams who were eligible, along with Sweden. Ecuador qualified after finishing in the third of four automatic qualification places in the CONMEBOL qualifying group behind Brazil and Argentina, reaching the finals for only the second time. Similar to Costa Rica, Ecuador were given low odds of around 400/1. In their preview of the tournament, The Guardian labelled Group A as the "weakest" in the competition.

=== Teams ===
Draw position	Team	Confederation	Method of qualification	Date of qualification	Finals appearance	Last appearance	Previous best performance	FIFA Rankings	
Draw position	Team	Confederation	Method of qualification	Date of qualification	Finals appearance	Last appearance	Previous best performance	November 2005 (Note: The rankings of November 2005 were used for seeding for the final draw along with performance at previous World Cups.)	June 2006
A1 (seed)	Germany	UEFA	Hosts	6 July 2000	16th	2002	Winners (1954, 1974, 1990)	16	19
A2	Costa Rica	CONCACAF	CONCACAF fourth round third place	8 October 2005	3rd	2002	Round of 16 (1990)	21	26
A3	Poland	UEFA	Best placed UEFA group runners-up	13 October 2005	7th	2002	Third place (1974, 1982)	23	29
A4	Ecuador	CONMEBOL	CONMEBOL third place	8 October 2005	2nd	2002	Group stage (2002)	37	39

== Standings ==
Pos	Team	Pld	W	D	L	GF	GA	GD	Pts	Qualification
1	Germany (H)	3	3	0	0	8	2	+6	9	Advance to knockout stage
2	Ecuador	3	2	0	1	5	3	+2	6	Advance to knockout stage
3	Poland	3	1	0	2	2	4	−2	3	
4	Costa Rica	3	0	0	3	3	9	−6	0	

Source: FIFA
Rules for classification: Tie-breaking criteria
(H) Hosts
- Germany advanced to play Sweden (runners-up of Group B) in the round of 16.
- Ecuador advanced to play England (winners of Group B) in the round of 16.

== Matches ==
All times local (CEST/UTC+2)

=== Germany vs Costa Rica ===
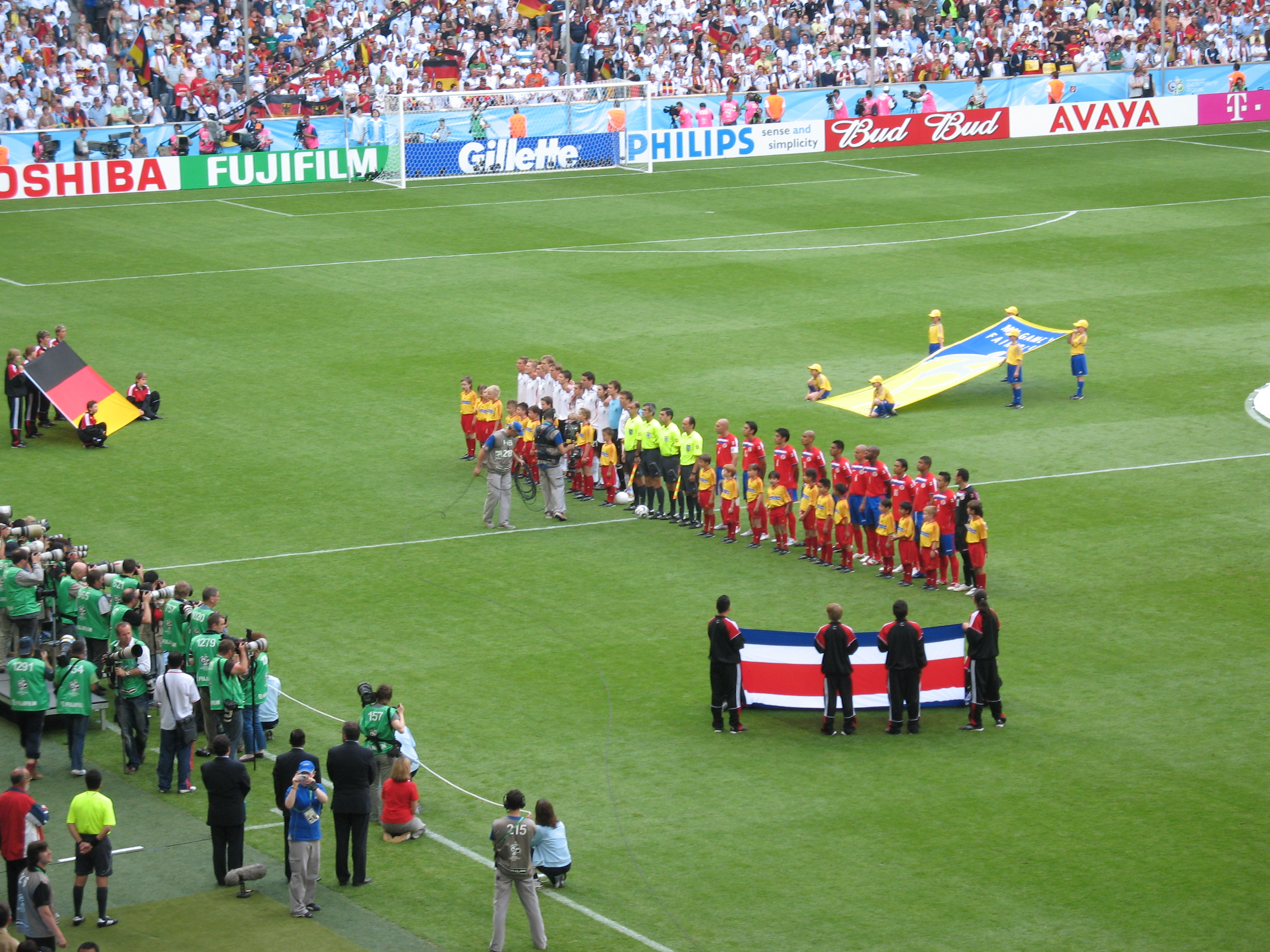
Germany and Costa Rica line-up ahead of the opening match of the World Cup

The opening match of Group A, and the World Cup, was between hosts Germany and Costa Rica. This was the first time the two sides had ever played each other in international football. Germany captain Michael Ballack was forced to withdraw from the starting line-up after failing to overcome an injury and was replaced by Tim Borowski. Defender Philipp Lahm gave Germany the lead after six minutes with a 30-yard curling shot from outside the penalty area that beat opposition goalkeeper José Porras and was described as "unstoppable" by the BBC. In doing so, Lahm became the fourth German player to have opened the scoring at a World Cup. Germany had further long range efforts soon after, before Costa Rica's Paulo Wanchope, already his country's record goalscorer, equalised after 12 minutes after breaching the German defence and finishing past goalkeeper Jens Lehmann. Wanchope's goal saw him become the first Costa Rican player to have scored in more than one World Cup and the second to have scored more than one World Cup goal after Rónald Gómez four years earlier.

Germany regained their lead five minutes later when Miroslav Klose finished from Bernd Schneider's cross. Costa Rica's Danny Fonseca became the first player to be booked in the competition after 30 minutes and the midfielder missed a chance to equalise shortly after half-time, heading wide despite being unmarked. Klose netted his second goal just after the hour-mark, putting in the rebound after his own header was parried by Porras. However, after 12 minutes Costa Rica again cut the deficit with Wanchope again scoring past Lehmann with a composed finish after receiving a cross from Walter Centeno, although the German players believed Wanchope was offside. The Germans sealed victory three minutes from time with Torsten Frings firing in a long-range shot that beat Porras in similar fashion to Lahm's goal. The six goals scored during the match made it the highest-scoring opening game in World Cup history since the tournament began using the single opening match format.

9 June 2006
18:00

Germany	4–2	Costa Rica
Lahm 6'; Klose 17', 61'; Frings 87'		Wanchope 12', 73'

Allianz Arena, Munich
Attendance: 66,000
Referee: Horacio Elizondo (Argentina)

Germany	Costa Rica

GK	1	Jens Lehmann
RB	3	Arne Friedrich
CB	17	Per Mertesacker
CB	21	Christoph Metzelder
LB	16	Philipp Lahm
RM	19	Bernd Schneider (c)	(substituted off) 90+1'
CM	8	Torsten Frings
CM	18	Tim Borowski	(substituted off) 72'
LM	7	Bastian Schweinsteiger
CF	11	Miroslav Klose	(substituted off) 79'
CF	20	Lukas Podolski
Substitutions:
MF	5	Sebastian Kehl	(substituted on) 72'
FW	10	Oliver Neuville	(substituted on) 79'
MF	22	David Odonkor	(substituted on) 90+1'
Manager:
Jürgen Klinsmann

GK	18	José Porras
RB	5	Gilberto Martínez		(substituted off) 66'
CB	4	Michael Umaña
CB	20	Douglas Sequeira
CB	3	Luis Marín (c)
LB	12	Leonardo González
CM	6	Danny Fonseca	(yellow card) 30'
CM	10	Walter Centeno
CM	8	Mauricio Solís		(substituted off) 78'
CF	11	Rónald Gómez		(substituted off) 90+1'
CF	9	Paulo Wanchope
Substitutions:
DF	2	Jervis Drummond		(substituted on) 66'
MF	7	Christian Bolaños		(substituted on) 78'
MF	14	Randall Azofeifa		(substituted on) 90+1'
Manager:
Alexandre Guimarães

Man of the Match:
Miroslav Klose (Germany)

Assistant referee:
Darío García (Argentina)
Rodolfo Otero (Argentina)
Fourth official:
Carlos Chandía (Chile)
Fifth official:
Cristian Julio (Chile)

=== Poland vs Ecuador ===
Poland and Ecuador had previously met once before their opening World Cup match, playing out a 1–1 draw during a friendly in November 2005. The Poles pressed the attack for the opening 20 minutes of the match, but were unable to create any significant chances. 24 minutes in, Ecuador took the lead when Carlos Tenorio got ahead of Marcin Baszczyński to head in after teammate Agustín Delgado had nodded the ball towards him from a long throw. Tenorio became only the third player to have scored a World Cup goal for Ecuador after Delgado and Édison Méndez. Buoyed by their goal, Ecuador took control of the game and had several chances before the end of the first half but failed to convert. However, Poland had struggled to make an impression and Jon Brodkin of The Guardian noted that they had "forced not a single meaningful save" from the opposition goalkeeper.

In the second half, Poland began pushing forward with Mirosław Szymkowiak creating several near chances, the best of which sent Jacek Krzynówek through before being called offside. In the final third of the game, Poland were denied by the woodwork twice; first when Ireneusz Jeleń struck the crossbar with a shot and later when Paweł Brożek hit the post. Despite their attacking threat, it was Ecuador who were able to score when Iván Kaviedes broke through before laying the ball off for Delgado to give his side a 2–0 lead. Delgado's goal made him his country's record World Cup goalscorer, which he would remain until being surpassed by Enner Valencia at the 2022 FIFA World Cup. This match was the fifth consecutive time that Poland had failed to score in their opening match at a World Cup finals.

9 June 2006
21:00

Poland	0–2	Ecuador
		C. Tenorio 24'; Delgado 80'

Arena AufSchalke, Gelsenkirchen
Attendance: 52,000
Referee: Toru Kamikawa (Japan)

Poland	Ecuador

GK	1	Artur Boruc
RB	4	Marcin Baszczyński
CB	2	Mariusz Jop
CB	6	Jacek Bąk (c)
LB	14	Michał Żewłakow
RM	15	Ebi Smolarek	(yellow card) 37'
CM	16	Arkadiusz Radomski
CM	7	Radosław Sobolewski		(substituted off) 67'
LM	10	Mirosław Szymkowiak
CF	8	Jacek Krzynówek		(substituted off) 78'
CF	9	Maciej Żurawski		(substituted off) 83'
Substitutions:
FW	21	Ireneusz Jeleń		(substituted on) 67'
MF	5	Kamil Kosowski		(substituted on) 78'
FW	23	Paweł Brożek		(substituted on) 83'
Manager:
Paweł Janas

GK	12	Cristian Mora
RB	4	Ulises de la Cruz
CB	3	Iván Hurtado (c)	(yellow card) 31'	(substituted off) 69'
CB	17	Giovanny Espinoza
LB	18	Neicer Reasco
RM	16	Antonio Valencia
CM	14	Segundo Castillo
CM	20	Edwin Tenorio
LM	8	Édison Méndez	(yellow card) 70'
CF	11	Agustín Delgado		(substituted off) 83'
CF	21	Carlos Tenorio		(substituted off) 65'
Substitutions:
FW	10	Iván Kaviedes		(substituted on) 65'
DF	2	Jorge Guagua		(substituted on) 69'
MF	6	Patricio Urrutia		(substituted on) 83'
Manager:
(Colombia) Luis Fernando Suárez

Man of the Match:
Agustín Delgado (Ecuador)

Assistant referees:
Yoshikazu Hiroshima (Japan)
Kim Dae-young (Korea Republic)
Fourth official:
Ľuboš Micheľ (Slovakia)
Fifth official:
Roman Slyško (Slovakia)

=== Germany vs Poland ===
This was the 15th international meeting between Germany and Poland since 1933 and their third in World Cup competition, having previously met at both the 1974 and 1978 World Cup finals, with Germany having never lost to their opponents. The Germans, with captain Ballack restored to the starting line-up in place of Borowski, dominated play and had a number of chances in the first half, with both Klose and his strike partner Lukas Podolski failing to convert more than one chance each. Poland's best chance came early on when Maciej Żurawski sent a scuffed shot towards Lehmann which was easily gathered.

During the second half Poland threatened with Jelen testing Lehmann early and Poland offered more attacking threat in the opening period. Germany also continued to push forward and forced Poland goalkeeper Artur Boruc into several saves, while both Klose and Ballack were denied by the frame of the goal during the same attack. With 15 minutes remaining, Polish midfielder Radosław Sobolewski was sent off for a second bookable offence after fouling Klose. In the last seconds of injury time, German substitutes David Odonkor and Oliver Neuville combined, the latter converting a cross from his teammate to secure a 1–0 victory, the first time Germany had ever won a World Cup game through an injury time goal. The win marked the first time Germany had beaten another European nation at a major international competition since defeating the Czech Republic in the UEFA Euro 1996 final.

14 June 2006
21:00

Germany	1–0	Poland
Neuville 90+1'

Westfalenstadion, Dortmund
Attendance: 65,000
Referee: Luis Medina Cantalejo (Spain)

Germany	Poland

GK	1	Jens Lehmann
RB	3	Arne Friedrich		(substituted off) 64'
CB	17	Per Mertesacker
CB	21	Christoph Metzelder	(yellow card) 70'
LB	16	Philipp Lahm
RM	19	Bernd Schneider
CM	8	Torsten Frings
CM	13	Michael Ballack (c)	(yellow card) 58'
LM	7	Bastian Schweinsteiger		(substituted off) 77'
CF	11	Miroslav Klose
CF	20	Lukas Podolski		(substituted off) 71'
Substitutions:
MF	22	David Odonkor	(yellow card) 68'	(substituted on) 64'
FW	10	Oliver Neuville		(substituted on) 71'
MF	18	Tim Borowski		(substituted on) 77'
Manager:
Jürgen Klinsmann

GK	1	Artur Boruc	(yellow card) 89'
RB	4	Marcin Baszczyński
CB	19	Bartosz Bosacki
CB	6	Jacek Bąk (c)
LB	14	Michał Żewłakow		(substituted off) 83'
CM	7	Radosław Sobolewski	(yellow card) 28' (yellow-red card) 75'
CM	16	Arkadiusz Radomski
RW	21	Ireneusz Jeleń		(substituted off) 90+1'
AM	9	Maciej Żurawski
LW	8	Jacek Krzynówek	(yellow card) 3'	(substituted off) 77'
CF	15	Ebi Smolarek
Substitutions:
DF	18	Mariusz Lewandowski		(substituted on) 77'
DF	17	Dariusz Dudka		(substituted on) 83'
FW	23	Paweł Brożek		(substituted on) 90+1'
Manager:
Paweł Janas

Man of the Match:
Philipp Lahm (Germany)

Assistant referees:
Victoriano Giráldez Carrasco (Spain)
Pedro Medina Hernández (Spain)
Fourth official:
Khalil Al Ghamdi (Saudi Arabia)
Fifth official:
Fathi Arabati (Jordan)

=== Ecuador vs Costa Rica ===
This was the ninth meeting between Ecuador and Costa Rica, but the first in a competitive fixture. Costa Rica had not beaten their opponents since the first meeting between the two in 1992 and defeat would eliminate them from the finals. Ecuador manager Luis Fernando Suárez deliberately left his squad announcement until the latest time allowed, noting that he aimed to "not give any clues to our rivals". Costa Rica were forced to omit fullback Gilberto Martínez due to injury. His side started brightly but Tenorio gave Ecuador an early lead, heading in from Antonio Valencia's cross after eight minutes for his second goal of the tournament. Costa Rica struggled to threaten their opponent's goal, registering their first shot on target after 39 minutes as Ecuador controlled possession.

Nine minutes into the second half, Ecuador doubled their lead through Delgado's second goal of the competition. Receiving a pass from Kaviedes, Delgado chested the ball down before beating Porras at his near post. Spurred into action by the second goal, Costa Rica first forced a save from Cristian Mora before Alvaro Saborio hit the crossbar. However, Ecuador sealed victory when Kaviedes added a third goal with a volley in the 92nd minute. As a result of their victory, both Ecuador and Germany were guaranteed to advance while Poland and Costa Rica were eliminated. In only their second finals, Ecuador qualified from the group stage for the first time in their history and the result remains the nation's biggest victory at a World Cup finals.

15 June 2006
15:00

Ecuador	3–0	Costa Rica
C. Tenorio 8'; Delgado 54'; Kaviedes 90+2'

Volksparkstadion, Hamburg
Attendance: 50,000
Referee: Coffi Codjia (Benin)

Ecuador	Costa Rica

GK	12	Cristian Mora	(yellow card) 60'
RB	4	Ulises de la Cruz	(yellow card) 54'
CB	3	Iván Hurtado (c)
CB	17	Giovanny Espinoza		(substituted off) 69'
LB	18	Neicer Reasco
RM	16	Antonio Valencia		(substituted off) 73'
CM	14	Segundo Castillo	(yellow card) 44'
CM	20	Edwin Tenorio
LM	8	Édison Méndez
CF	11	Agustín Delgado
CF	21	Carlos Tenorio		(substituted off) 46'
Substitutions:
FW	10	Iván Kaviedes		(substituted on) 46'
DF	2	Jorge Guagua		(substituted on) 69'
MF	6	Patricio Urrutia		(substituted on) 73'
Manager:
(Colombia) Luis Fernando Suárez

GK	18	José Porras
CB	4	Michael Umaña
CB	3	Luis Marín (c)	(yellow card) 10'
CB	20	Douglas Sequeira
RM	15	Harold Wallace
CM	8	Mauricio Solís	(yellow card) 28'
CM	6	Danny Fonseca		(substituted off) 29'
LM	12	Leonardo González		(substituted off) 56'
AM	10	Walter Centeno		(substituted off) 84'
AM	11	Rónald Gómez
CF	9	Paulo Wanchope
Substitutions:
FW	19	Álvaro Saborío		(substituted on) 29'
MF	16	Carlos Hernández		(substituted on) 56'
FW	13	Kurt Bernard		(substituted on) 84'
Manager:
Alexandre Guimarães

Man of the Match:
Agustín Delgado (Ecuador)

Assistant referees:
Celestin Ntagungira (Rwanda)
Aboudou Aderodjou (Benin)
Fourth official:
Mohamed Guezzaz (Morocco)
Fifth official:
Brahim Djezzar (Algeria)

=== Ecuador vs Germany ===
This was the first time that Ecuador and Germany had ever played each other. Both teams had already qualified for the next round, with Ecuador ahead on goal difference ahead of the game. Germany fielded a full strength side, but were forced to deny the presence of a rift between strike partners Klose and Podolski after the former had criticised his teammate. Ecuador instead chose to rest several first team players, including forwards Delgado and Tenorio and captain Iván Hurtado. Klose gave Germany the lead after just four minutes, scoring from eight-yards after Bastian Schweinsteiger had capitalised on a failed clearance by the opposition defence to play in his teammate. His goal was the second fastest ever scored by a German player at a World Cup, coming one minute after Rüdiger Abramczik's record in 1978. Germany continued to press and had several chances, the best being Podolski racing through before being beaten to the ball by Mora. With the goalkeeper out of his penalty area, Ballack attempted to loop the ball over Mora from 40-yards but his attempt went wide of the goal.

Klose added a second goal shortly before half-time; captain Ballack chipped the ball over the Ecuadorian defence, allowing Klose to round Mora in the opposition goal to score his fourth of the tournament. Early in the second half, Ecuador attempted to get back into the game, Edwin Tenorio forcing a save from Lehmann from 25-yards out. Podolski scored his first World Cup goal following a swift counterattack. Schweinsteiger's pass allowed Bernd Schneider to cross from which Podolski scored. With a three goal lead, Germany made several substitutions to rest key players and saw out the game to finish top of the group, the fifth consecutive time that they had done so at the World Cup finals.

20 June 2006
16:00

Ecuador	0–3	Germany
		Klose 4', 44'; Podolski 57'

Olympiastadion, Berlin
Attendance: 72,000
Referee: Valentin Ivanov (Russia)

Ecuador	Germany

GK	12	Cristian Mora
RB	4	Ulises de la Cruz
CB	2	Jorge Guagua
CB	17	Giovanny Espinoza
LB	13	Paúl Ambrosi
RM	16	Antonio Valencia	(yellow card) 52'	(substituted off) 63'
CM	15	Marlon Ayoví (c)		(substituted off) 68'
CM	20	Edwin Tenorio
LM	8	Édison Méndez
CF	10	Iván Kaviedes
CF	9	Félix Borja		(substituted off) 46'
Substitutions:
FW	23	Christian Benítez		(substituted on) 46'
DF	7	Christian Lara		(substituted on) 63'
MF	6	Patricio Urrutia		(substituted on) 68'
Manager:
(Colombia) Luis Fernando Suárez

GK	1	Jens Lehmann
RB	3	Arne Friedrich
CB	17	Per Mertesacker
CB	4	Robert Huth
LB	16	Philipp Lahm
RM	19	Bernd Schneider		(substituted off) 73'
CM	8	Torsten Frings		(substituted off) 66'
CM	13	Michael Ballack (c)
LM	7	Bastian Schweinsteiger
CF	11	Miroslav Klose		(substituted off) 66'
CF	20	Lukas Podolski
Substitutions:
FW	10	Oliver Neuville		(substituted on) 66'
MF	18	Tim Borowski	(yellow card) 75'	(substituted on) 66'
MF	14	Gerald Asamoah		(substituted on) 73'
Manager:
Jürgen Klinsmann

Man of the Match:
Michael Ballack (Germany)

Assistant referees:
Nikolay Golubev (Russia)
Evgeni Volnin (Russia)
Fourth official:
Kevin Stott (United States)
Fifth official:
Chris Strickland (United States)

=== Costa Rica vs Poland ===
Poland and Costa Rica had previously met on two other occasions, both ending in victories for the Poles, but this was their first competitive fixture. With both teams already eliminated, their final match was a dead rubber played in high temperatures. Poland held the majority of possession early on but Costa Rica took the lead after 25 minutes, Gomez scoring via a direct free-kick which went through the defensive wall and the legs of Boruc who was unable to react. However, Poland equalised eight minutes later when Bartosz Bosacki scored his first international goal and his nation's first of the competition, volleying in off the crossbar from Żurawski's corner, the Poles' sixth of the game, after Porras had failed to gather the ball. Bosacki added a second in the 66th minute, again from a corner, this time with a powerful header. Wanchope had a late goal ruled out for offside as the match eventually finished 2–1 to Poland. Referee Shamsul Maidin gave out 10 yellow cards during the game, the fourth highest in World Cup history at the time.

20 June 2006
16:00

Costa Rica	1–2	Poland
Gómez 25'		Bosacki 33', 65'

Niedersachsenstadion, Hanover
Attendance: 43,000
Referee: Shamsul Maidin (Singapore)

Costa Rica	Poland

GK	18	José Porras
CB	4	Michael Umaña	(yellow card) 17'
CB	3	Luis Marín (c)	(yellow card) 45+2'
CB	17	Gabriel Badilla	(yellow card) 56'
RM	2	Jervis Drummond		(substituted off) 70'
CM	8	Mauricio Solís
CM	7	Christian Bolaños		(substituted off) 78'
CM	10	Walter Centeno
LM	12	Leonardo González	(yellow card) 76'
CF	9	Paulo Wanchope
CF	11	Rónald Gómez	(yellow card) 45+2'	(substituted off) 82'
Substitutions:
MF	15	Harold Wallace		(substituted on) 70'
MF	19	Álvaro Saborío		(substituted on) 78'
MF	16	Carlos Hernández		(substituted on) 82'
Manager:
Alexandre Guimarães

GK	1	Artur Boruc	(yellow card) 90+1'
RB	4	Marcin Baszczyński	(yellow card) 60'
CB	19	Bartosz Bosacki
CB	6	Jacek Bąk (c)	(yellow card) 24'
LB	14	Michał Żewłakow	(yellow card) 29'
RM	15	Ebi Smolarek		(substituted off) 85'
CM	16	Arkadiusz Radomski	(yellow card) 18'	(substituted off) 64'
CM	10	Mirosław Szymkowiak
LM	8	Jacek Krzynówek
CF	21	Ireneusz Jeleń
CF	9	Maciej Żurawski		(substituted off) 46'
Substitutions:
FW	23	Paweł Brożek		(substituted on) 46'
DF	18	Mariusz Lewandowski		(substituted on) 64'
FW	11	Grzegorz Rasiak		(substituted on) 85'
Manager:
Paweł Janas

Man of the Match:
Bartosz Bosacki (Poland)

Assistant referees:
Prachya Permpanich (Thailand)
Eisa Gholoum (United Arab Emirates)
Fourth official:
Jerome Damon (South Africa)
Fifth official:
Justice Yeboah (Ghana)

== Aftermath ==
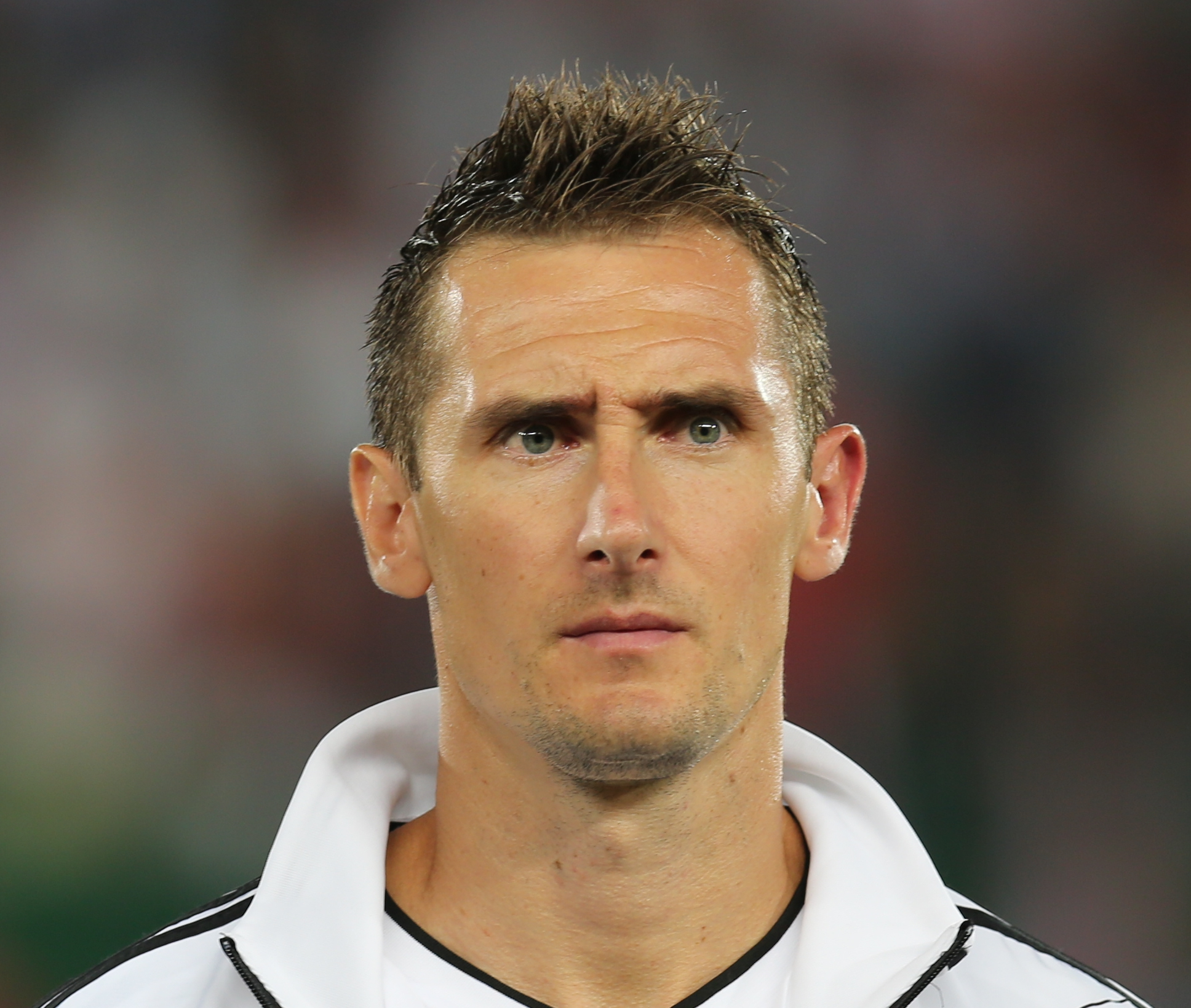
Miroslav Klose scored four times for Germany in Group A

Germany finished top of the group with nine points having won all three of their group matches. They faced Sweden, the runners-up of Group B, in the round of 16, winning 2–0. They went on to defeat Argentina in the quarter-finals on penalties before suffering defeat to Italy in the semi-finals. Germany finished third after defeating Portugal 3–1 in the match for third place. As runners-up in the group with six points, Ecuador faced the winners of Group B, England, in the next round but were eliminated after a 1–0 defeat. Poland would not return to the competition until the 2018 World Cup while Costa Rica failed to qualify for the 2010 World Cup before returning for the 2014 tournament.

Klose's four goals during the group stage contributed to him winning the Golden Boot as the competition's top goalscorer. He finished the World Cup with five in total, the lowest tally needed to win the award since 1962. His teammate Podolski went on to win the young player of the tournament award.

== See also ==
- Costa Rica at the FIFA World Cup
- Ecuador at the FIFA World Cup
- Germany at the FIFA World Cup
- Poland at the FIFA World Cup
