= 2006 FIFA World Cup knockout stage =

The knockout stage was the second and final stage of the 2006 FIFA World Cup, following the group stage. The top two teams from each group (16 in total) advance to the knockout stage to compete in a single-elimination style tournament. A match was played between the two losing teams of the semi-finals to determine which team finished in third place.

All times local (CEST/UTC+2)

== Qualified teams ==
The top two placed teams from each of the eight groups qualified for the knockout stage.

Group	Winners	Runners-up
A	Germany	Ecuador
B	England	Sweden
C	Argentina	Netherlands
D	Portugal	Mexico
E	Italy	Ghana
F	Brazil	Australia
G	Switzerland	France
H	Spain	Ukraine

== Bracket ==
Round of 16
24 June – Munich
Germany	2
Sweden	0
24 June – Leipzig
Argentina (a.e.t.)	2
Mexico	1
26 June – Kaiserslautern
Italy	1
Australia	0
26 June – Cologne
Switzerland	0 (0)
Ukraine (p)	0 (3)
25 June – Stuttgart
England	1
Ecuador	0
25 June – Nuremberg
Portugal	1
Netherlands	0
27 June – Dortmund
Brazil	3
Ghana	0
27 June – Hanover
Spain	1
France	3

Quarter-finals
30 June – Berlin
Germany (p)	1 (4)
Argentina	1 (2)
30 June – Hamburg
Italy	3
Ukraine	0
1 July – Gelsenkirchen
England	0 (1)
Portugal (p)	0 (3)
1 July – Frankfurt
Brazil	0
France	1

Semi-finals
4 July – Dortmund
Germany	0
Italy (a.e.t.)	2
5 July – Munich
Portugal	0
France	1

Final
9 July – Berlin
Italy (p)	1 (5)
France	1 (3)
Match for third place
8 July – Stuttgart
Germany	3
Portugal	1

== Round of 16 ==
=== Germany vs Sweden ===
Germany progressed thanks to two goals from Lukas Podolski inside the opening 12 minutes. His first was in the fourth minute; German captain Michael Ballack sent a pass to Miroslav Klose, who was tackled by goalkeeper Andreas Isaksson, only for an onrushing Podolski to turn the ball in. Eight minutes later, a pass from Klose found Podolski, who scored his second goal. On 35 minutes, Teddy Lučić received a second yellow card for a foul on Klose. In the 52nd minute, Henrik Larsson won a penalty for Sweden when he was challenged by Christoph Metzelder, only for Larsson himself to shoot the ball over the crossbar. Germany held out for a 2–0 win.

24 June 2006
17:00

Germany	2–0	Sweden
Podolski 4', 12'

Allianz Arena, Munich
Attendance: 66,000
Referee: Carlos Eugênio Simon (Brazil)

Germany	Sweden

GK	1	Jens Lehmann
RB	3	Arne Friedrich
CB	17	Per Mertesacker
CB	21	Christoph Metzelder
LB	16	Philipp Lahm
RM	19	Bernd Schneider
CM	8	Torsten Frings	(yellow card) 27'	(substituted off) 85'
CM	13	Michael Ballack (c)
LM	7	Bastian Schweinsteiger		(substituted off) 72'
CF	11	Miroslav Klose
CF	20	Lukas Podolski		(substituted off) 74'
Substitutions:
MF	18	Tim Borowski		(substituted on) 72'
FW	10	Oliver Neuville		(substituted on) 74'
MF	5	Sebastian Kehl		(substituted on) 85'
Manager:
Jürgen Klinsmann

GK	1	Andreas Isaksson
RB	7	Niclas Alexandersson
CB	3	Olof Mellberg (c)
CB	4	Teddy Lučić	(yellow card) 28' (yellow-red card) 35'
LB	5	Erik Edman
DM	6	Tobias Linderoth
RM	18	Mattias Jonson	(yellow card) 48'	(substituted off) 52'
LM	9	Freddie Ljungberg
AM	16	Kim Källström		(substituted off) 39'
CF	10	Zlatan Ibrahimović		(substituted off) 72'
CF	11	Henrik Larsson
Substitutions:
DF	13	Petter Hansson		(substituted on) 39'
MF	21	Christian Wilhelmsson		(substituted on) 52'
FW	20	Marcus Allbäck	(yellow card) 78'	(substituted on) 72'
Manager:
Lars Lagerbäck

Man of the Match:
Miroslav Klose (Germany)

Assistant referees:
Aristeu Tavares (Brazil)
Edmílson Corona (Brazil)
Fourth official:
Shamsul Maidin (Singapore)
Fifth official:
Prachya Permpanich (Thailand)

=== Argentina vs Mexico ===
24 June 2006
21:00

Argentina	2–1 (a.e.t.)	Mexico
Crespo 10'; Rodríguez 98'		Márquez 5'

Zentralstadion, Leipzig
Attendance: 43,000
Referee: Massimo Busacca (Switzerland)

Argentina	Mexico

GK	1	Roberto Abbondanzieri
RB	13	Lionel Scaloni
CB	2	Roberto Ayala
CB	6	Gabriel Heinze	(yellow card) 45+1'
LB	3	Juan Pablo Sorín (c)	(yellow card) 112'
DM	8	Javier Mascherano
RM	5	Esteban Cambiasso		(substituted off) 76'
LM	18	Maxi Rodríguez
AM	10	Juan Román Riquelme
CF	7	Javier Saviola		(substituted off) 84'
CF	9	Hernán Crespo		(substituted off) 75'
Substitutions:
FW	11	Carlos Tevez		(substituted on) 75'
MF	16	Pablo Aimar		(substituted on) 76'
FW	19	Lionel Messi		(substituted on) 84'
Manager:
José Pékerman

GK	1	Oswaldo Sánchez
CB	4	Rafael Márquez (c)	(yellow card) 70'
CB	5	Ricardo Osorio
CB	3	Carlos Salcido
RM	16	Mario Méndez
CM	15	José Antonio Castro	(yellow card) 82'
CM	8	Pável Pardo		(substituted off) 38'
CM	11	Ramón Morales		(substituted off) 74'
LM	18	Andrés Guardado		(substituted off) 66'
CF	17	Francisco Fonseca	(yellow card) 119'
CF	9	Jared Borgetti
Substitutions:
MF	6	Gerardo Torrado	(yellow card) 118'	(substituted on) 38'
MF	14	Gonzalo Pineda		(substituted on) 66'
MF	7	Sinha		(substituted on) 74'
Manager:
(Argentina) Ricardo La Volpe

Man of the Match:
Maxi Rodríguez (Argentina)

Assistant referees:
Francesco Buragina (Switzerland)
Matthias Arnet (Switzerland)
Fourth official:
Khalil Al Ghamdi (Saudi Arabia)
Fifth official:
Fathi Arabati (Jordan)

=== England vs Ecuador ===
25 June 2006
17:00

England	1–0	Ecuador
Beckham 60'

Gottlieb-Daimler-Stadion, Stuttgart
Attendance: 52,000
Referee: Frank De Bleeckere (Belgium)

England	Ecuador

GK	1	Paul Robinson	(yellow card) 78'
RB	16	Owen Hargreaves
CB	5	Rio Ferdinand
CB	6	John Terry	(yellow card) 18'
LB	3	Ashley Cole
DM	18	Michael Carrick
RM	7	David Beckham (c)		(substituted off) 87'
CM	4	Steven Gerrard		(substituted off) 90+2'
CM	8	Frank Lampard
LM	11	Joe Cole		(substituted off) 77'
CF	9	Wayne Rooney
Substitutions:
DF	15	Jamie Carragher	(yellow card) 82'	(substituted on) 77'
MF	19	Aaron Lennon		(substituted on) 87'
MF	20	Stewart Downing		(substituted on) 90+2'
Manager:
(Sweden) Sven-Göran Eriksson

GK	12	Cristian Mora
RB	4	Ulises de la Cruz	(yellow card) 67'
CB	3	Iván Hurtado (c)
CB	17	Giovanny Espinoza
LB	18	Neicer Reasco
RM	16	Antonio Valencia	(yellow card) 24'
CM	14	Segundo Castillo
CM	20	Edwin Tenorio		(substituted off) 69'
LM	8	Édison Méndez
CF	21	Carlos Tenorio	(yellow card) 37'	(substituted off) 72'
CF	11	Agustín Delgado
Substitutions:
MF	7	Christian Lara		(substituted on) 69'
FW	10	Iván Kaviedes		(substituted on) 72'
Manager:
(Colombia) Luis Fernando Suárez

Man of the Match:
John Terry (England)

Assistant referees:
Peter Hermans (Belgium)
Walter Vromans (Belgium)
Fourth official:
Óscar Ruiz (Colombia)
Fifth official:
José Navia (Colombia)

=== Portugal vs Netherlands ===
25 June 2006
21:00

Portugal	1–0	Netherlands
Maniche 23'

Frankenstadion, Nuremberg
Attendance: 41,000
Referee: Valentin Ivanov (Russia)

Portugal	Netherlands

GK	1	Ricardo	(yellow card) 76'
RB	13	Miguel
CB	5	Fernando Meira
CB	16	Ricardo Carvalho
LB	14	Nuno Valente	(yellow card) 76'
CM	6	Costinha	(yellow card) 31' (yellow-red card) 45+1'
CM	18	Maniche	(yellow card) 20'
RW	7	Luís Figo (c)	(yellow card) 60'	(substituted off) 84'
AM	20	Deco	(yellow card) 73' (yellow-red card) 78'
LW	17	Cristiano Ronaldo		(substituted off) 34'
CF	9	Pauleta		(substituted off) 46'
Substitutions:
FW	11	Simão		(substituted on) 34'
MF	8	Petit	(yellow card) 50'	(substituted on) 46'
MF	19	Tiago		(substituted on) 84'
Manager:
(Brazil) Luiz Felipe Scolari

GK	1	Edwin van der Sar (c)
RB	3	Khalid Boulahrouz	(yellow card) 7' (yellow-red card) 63'
CB	13	André Ooijer
CB	4	Joris Mathijsen		(substituted off) 56'
LB	5	Giovanni van Bronckhorst	(yellow card) 59' (yellow-red card) 90+5'
CM	18	Mark van Bommel	(yellow card) 2'	(substituted off) 67'
CM	20	Wesley Sneijder	(yellow card) 73'
CM	8	Phillip Cocu		(substituted off) 84'
RW	17	Robin van Persie
CF	7	Dirk Kuyt
LW	11	Arjen Robben
Substitutions:
MF	10	Rafael van der Vaart	(yellow card) 74'	(substituted on) 56'
DF	14	John Heitinga		(substituted on) 67'
FW	19	Jan Vennegoor of Hesselink		(substituted on) 84'
Manager:
Marco van Basten

Man of the Match:
Maniche (Portugal)

Assistant referees:
Nikolay Golubev (Russia)
Evgeni Volnin (Russia)
Fourth official:
Marco Rodríguez (Mexico)
Fifth official:
José Luis Camargo (Mexico)

=== Italy vs Australia ===
This fixture was the first time the two teams had played each other, and also the first time Australia had participated in a knockout fixture at a World Cup.

Italy created early chances in the first half via Alberto Gilardino and Luca Toni, with Toni's powerful strike being parried away from the Australia goal by Mark Schwarzer's leg. Australia had their best chance via Scott Chipperfield, who shot directly at Italy goalkeeper Gianluigi Buffon.

Early in the second half, Italy were reduced to 10 men when defender Marco Materazzi was given a straight red card for a two-footed tackle on Mark Bresciano. Australia dominated possession but failed to capitalise on having an extra man - Chipperfield had another shot at goal on a tight angle which was easily saved, while Tim Cahill almost scored via a header soon afterwards.

Deep into stoppage time, with the match still at 0–0 and seemingly headed for extra time, Fabio Grosso found space to cut into the Australia penalty box, beating Bresciano in the process. As he closed in on the Australia goal, skipper Lucas Neill went to ground in an attempt to tackle the ball away, and Grosso made contact with Neill's prostrate body and fell, earning a penalty kick.

Despite pleas from the Australian players, the penalty stood, and Francesco Totti struck the resultant penalty into the top left corner. Referee Luis Medina Cantalejo immediately blew full-time, ending the match 1–0, thereby eliminating Australia. The penalty was the first last minute deciding goal to be scored from the penalty spot in World Cup history, and with the victory, Italy remained unbeaten in their last 22 international fixtures–their longest undefeated sequence since 1939.

After the match, Italy coach Marcello Lippi agreed with the penalty decision, and acknowledged that Australia dominated possession and put his team under pressure when Materazzi was dismissed, but insisted that Australia looked unlikely to score. Australia coach Guus Hiddink stated the penalty decision was questionable and later decided to step down as Australia coach and take a new role with the Russian national side.

In October 2006, then-FIFA president Sepp Blatter apologised to Australian fans and said Australia should have reached the quarter-finals instead of eventual champions Italy.

In 2010, Grosso told Football+ Magazine that he "accentuated the challenge a little bit" when Neill slid in.

26 June 2006
17:00

Italy	1–0	Australia
Totti 90+5' (pen.)

Fritz-Walter-Stadion, Kaiserslautern
Attendance: 46,000
Referee: Luis Medina Cantalejo (Spain)

Italy	Australia

GK	1	Gianluigi Buffon
RB	19	Gianluca Zambrotta	(yellow card) 90+1'
CB	5	Fabio Cannavaro (c)
CB	23	Marco Materazzi	(red card) 50'
LB	3	Fabio Grosso	(yellow card) 29'
RM	20	Simone Perrotta
CM	21	Andrea Pirlo
LM	8	Gennaro Gattuso	(yellow card) 89'
AM	7	Alessandro Del Piero		(substituted off) 75'
CF	11	Alberto Gilardino		(substituted off) 46'
CF	9	Luca Toni		(substituted off) 56'
Substitutions:
FW	15	Vincenzo Iaquinta		(substituted on) 46'
DF	6	Andrea Barzagli		(substituted on) 56'
FW	10	Francesco Totti		(substituted on) 75'
Manager:
Marcello Lippi

GK	1	Mark Schwarzer
CB	3	Craig Moore
CB	2	Lucas Neill
CB	14	Scott Chipperfield
RM	5	Jason Culina
CM	13	Vince Grella	(yellow card) 23'
LM	20	Luke Wilkshire	(yellow card) 61'
RW	21	Mile Sterjovski		(substituted off) 81'
AM	4	Tim Cahill	(yellow card) 49'
LW	23	Mark Bresciano
CF	9	Mark Viduka (c)
Substitutions:
FW	15	John Aloisi		(substituted on) 81'
Manager:
(Netherlands) Guus Hiddink

Man of the Match:
Gianluigi Buffon (Italy)

Assistant referees:
Víctoriano Giráldez Carrasco (Spain)
Pedro Medina Hernández (Spain)
Fourth official:
Éric Poulat (France)
Fifth official:
Lionel Dagorne (France)

=== Switzerland vs Ukraine ===
Despite their early elimination, Switzerland became the first team in the history of the FIFA World Cup to leave an edition of the tournament without conceding a single goal.

26 June 2006
21:00

Switzerland	0–0 (a.e.t.)	Ukraine
Penalties
Streller (penalty missed); Barnetta (penalty missed); Cabanas (penalty missed)	0–3	(penalty missed) Shevchenko; (penalty scored) Milevskyi; (penalty scored) Rebrov; (penalty scored) Husiev

RheinEnergieStadion, Cologne
Attendance: 45,000
Referee: Benito Archundia (Mexico)

Switzerland	Ukraine

GK	1	Pascal Zuberbühler
RB	23	Philipp Degen
CB	2	Johan Djourou		(substituted off) 34'
CB	20	Patrick Müller
LB	3	Ludovic Magnin
DM	6	Johann Vogel (c)
RM	16	Tranquillo Barnetta	(yellow card) 59'
LM	8	Raphaël Wicky
AM	7	Ricardo Cabanas
SS	22	Hakan Yakin		(substituted off) 64'
CF	9	Alexander Frei		(substituted off) 117'
Substitutions:
DF	13	Stéphane Grichting		(substituted on) 34'
FW	11	Marco Streller		(substituted on) 64'
FW	18	Mauro Lustrinelli		(substituted on) 117'
Manager:
Köbi Kuhn

GK	1	Oleksandr Shovkovskyi
CB	9	Oleh Husyev
CB	17	Vladyslav Vashchuk
CB	2	Andriy Nesmachnyi
CM	8	Oleh Shelayev
CM	14	Andriy Husin
CM	4	Anatoliy Tymoschuk
AM	16	Andriy Vorobey	(substituted off) 94'
AM	19	Maksym Kalynychenko	(substituted off) 75'
SS	10	Andriy Voronin	(substituted off) 111'
CF	7	Andriy Shevchenko (c)
Substitutions:
MF	21	Ruslan Rotan	(substituted on) 75'
FW	11	Serhii Rebrov	(substituted on) 94'
FW	15	Artem Milevskyi	(substituted on) 111'
Manager:
Oleg Blokhin

Man of the Match:
Oleksandr Shovkovskyi (Ukraine)

Assistant referees:
José Ramírez (Mexico)
Héctor Vergara (Canada)
Fourth official:
Jerome Damon (South Africa)
Fifth official:
Justice Yeboah (Ghana)

=== Brazil vs Ghana ===
27 June 2006
17:00

Brazil	3–0	Ghana
Ronaldo 5'; Adriano 45+1'; Zé Roberto 84'

Westfalenstadion, Dortmund
Attendance: 65,000
Referee: Ľuboš Micheľ (Slovakia)

Brazil	Ghana

GK	1	Dida
RB	2	Cafu (c)
CB	3	Lúcio
CB	4	Juan	(yellow card) 44'
LB	6	Roberto Carlos
CM	5	Emerson		(substituted off) 46'
CM	11	Zé Roberto
AM	8	Kaká		(substituted off) 83'
AM	10	Ronaldinho
CF	7	Adriano	(yellow card) 13'	(substituted off) 61'
CF	9	Ronaldo
Substitutions:
MF	17	Gilberto Silva		(substituted on) 46'
MF	19	Juninho		(substituted on) 61'
MF	20	Ricardinho		(substituted on) 83'
FW	23	Robinho
GK	22	Júlio César
Manager:
Carlos Alberto Parreira

GK	22	Richard Kingson
RB	15	John Paintsil	(yellow card) 29'
CB	5	John Mensah
CB	7	Illiasu Shilla
LB	6	Emmanuel Pappoe
RM	23	Haminu Dramani
CM	18	Eric Addo	(yellow card) 38'	(substituted off) 60'
CM	10	Stephen Appiah (c)	(yellow card) 7'
LM	11	Sulley Muntari	(yellow card) 11'
CF	3	Asamoah Gyan	(yellow card) 48' (yellow-red card) 81'
CF	14	Matthew Amoah		(substituted off) 70'
Substitutions:
MF	9	Derek Boateng		(substituted on) 60'
FW	12	Alex Tachie-Mensah		(substituted on) 70'
MF	8	Michael Essien
Manager:
(Serbia and Montenegro) Ratomir Dujković

Man of the Match:
Zé Roberto (Brazil)

Assistant referees:
Roman Slyško (Slovakia)
Martin Balko (Slovakia)
Fourth official:
Mark Shield (Australia)
Fifth official:
Nathan Gibson (Australia)

=== Spain vs France ===
27 June 2006
21:00

Spain	1–3	France
Villa 28' (pen.)		Ribéry 41'; Vieira 83'; Zidane 90+2'

Niedersachsenstadion, Hanover
Attendance: 43,000
Referee: Roberto Rosetti (Italy)

Spain	France

GK	1	Iker Casillas
RB	15	Sergio Ramos
CB	22	Pablo
CB	5	Carles Puyol	(yellow card) 82'
LB	3	Mariano Pernía
CM	18	Cesc Fàbregas
CM	14	Xabi Alonso
CM	8	Xavi		(substituted off) 72'
AM	21	David Villa		(substituted off) 54'
AM	9	Fernando Torres
CF	7	Raúl (c)		(substituted off) 54'
Substitutions:
FW	11	Luis García		(substituted on) 54'
MF	17	Joaquín		(substituted on) 54'
MF	16	Marcos Senna		(substituted on) 72'
Manager:
Luis Aragonés

GK	16	Fabien Barthez
RB	19	Willy Sagnol
CB	15	Lilian Thuram
CB	5	William Gallas
LB	3	Eric Abidal
CM	4	Patrick Vieira	(yellow card) 68'
CM	6	Claude Makélélé
RW	22	Franck Ribéry	(yellow card) 87'
AM	10	Zinedine Zidane (c)	(yellow card) 90+1'
LW	7	Florent Malouda		(substituted off) 74'
CF	12	Thierry Henry		(substituted off) 88'
Substitutions:
FW	9	Sidney Govou		(substituted on) 74'
FW	11	Sylvain Wiltord		(substituted on) 88'
FW	20	David Trezeguet
Manager:
Raymond Domenech

Man of the Match:
Patrick Vieira (France)

Assistant referees:
Cristiano Copelli (Italy)
Alessandro Stagnoli (Italy)
Fourth official:
Markus Merk (Germany)
Fifth official:
Christian Schräer (Germany)

== Quarter-finals ==
=== Germany vs Argentina ===
Argentina took the lead in the 49th minute with a header from Roberto Ayala after a corner from the right by Juan Román Riquelme, but the South Americans’ goalkeeper Roberto Abbondanzieri was injured after the goal and his replacement Leo Franco was unable to stop Miroslav Klose from equalizing with a header from six yards out to the left with ten minutes left in regulation time. The match went to extra time. With no goals scored, the semi-final spot came down to penalties, during which German goalkeeper Jens Lehmann was seen looking at a piece of paper kept in his sock before each Argentinian player would come forward for a penalty kick. Lehmann had researched the penalty taking habits of seven players on the Argentinian team. However, only two players on his list ended up taking a penalty that day. On the attempts by those two players, Lehmann saved one and came close to saving the other. He then had to guess on Esteban Cambiasso's kick since he did not have any information written on his list about Cambiasso. However, he derived an educated guess from the videos he had studied and pretended to read the piece of paper and nodded his head before putting it away, implying to Cambiasso that he did in fact have information on the kicker. Lehmann guessed correctly and saved the penalty, thus winning the shoot-out for Germany. "Lehmann's list" became so popular in the annals of German football history that it is now in the Haus der Geschichte museum.

30 June 2006
17:00

Germany	1–1 (a.e.t.)	Argentina
Klose 80'		Ayala 49'
Penalties
Neuville (penalty scored); Ballack (penalty scored); Podolski (penalty scored); Borowski (penalty scored)	4–2	(penalty scored) Cruz; (penalty missed) Ayala; (penalty scored) Rodríguez; (penalty missed) Cambiasso

Olympiastadion, Berlin
Attendance: 72,000
Referee: Ľuboš Micheľ (Slovakia)

Germany	Argentina

GK	1	Jens Lehmann
RB	3	Arne Friedrich	(yellow card) 114'
CB	17	Per Mertesacker
CB	21	Christoph Metzelder
LB	16	Philipp Lahm
RM	19	Bernd Schneider		(substituted off) 62'
CM	8	Torsten Frings
CM	13	Michael Ballack (c)
LM	7	Bastian Schweinsteiger		(substituted off) 74'
CF	11	Miroslav Klose		(substituted off) 86'
CF	20	Lukas Podolski	(yellow card) 3'
Substitutions:
MF	18	Tim Borowski		(substituted on) 74'
MF	22	David Odonkor	(yellow card) 94'	(substituted on) 62'
FW	10	Oliver Neuville		(substituted on) 86'
Manager:
Jürgen Klinsmann

GK	1	Roberto Abbondanzieri		(substituted off) 71'
RB	4	Fabricio Coloccini
CB	2	Roberto Ayala
CB	6	Gabriel Heinze
LB	3	Juan Pablo Sorín (c)	(yellow card) 46'
DM	8	Javier Mascherano	(yellow card) 60'
RM	18	Maxi Rodríguez	(yellow card) 88'
LM	22	Lucho González
AM	10	Juan Román Riquelme		(substituted off) 72'
CF	9	Hernán Crespo		(substituted off) 79'
CF	11	Carlos Tevez
Substitutions:
GK	12	Leo Franco		(substituted on) 71'
MF	5	Esteban Cambiasso		(substituted on) 72'
FW	20	Julio Cruz	(yellow card) 95'	(substituted on) 79'
Other disciplinary actions:
DF	17	Leandro Cufré	(red card) FT
Manager:
José Pékerman

Man of the Match:
Michael Ballack (Germany)

Assistant referees:
Roman Slysko (Slovakia)
Martin Balko (Slovakia)
Fourth official:
Massimo Busacca (Switzerland)
Fifth official:
Francesco Buragina (Switzerland)

=== Italy vs Ukraine ===
30 June 2006
21:00

Italy	3–0	Ukraine
Zambrotta 6'; Toni 59', 69'

Volksparkstadion, Hamburg
Attendance: 50,000
Referee: Frank De Bleeckere (Belgium)

Italy	Ukraine

GK	1	Gianluigi Buffon
RB	19	Gianluca Zambrotta
CB	5	Fabio Cannavaro (c)
CB	6	Andrea Barzagli
LB	3	Fabio Grosso
RM	16	Mauro Camoranesi	(substituted off) 68'
CM	21	Andrea Pirlo	(substituted off) 68'
CM	8	Gennaro Gattuso	(substituted off) 77'
LM	20	Simone Perrotta
AM	10	Francesco Totti
CF	9	Luca Toni
Substitutions:
MF	17	Simone Barone	(substituted on) 68'
DF	22	Massimo Oddo	(substituted on) 68'
DF	2	Cristian Zaccardo	(substituted on) 77'
Manager:
Marcello Lippi

GK	1	Oleksandr Shovkovskyi
RB	9	Oleh Husyev
CB	22	Vyacheslav Sviderskyi	(yellow card) 16'	(substituted off) 20'
CB	6	Andriy Rusol		(substituted off) 45+2'
LB	2	Andriy Nesmachnyi
CM	14	Andriy Husin
CM	4	Anatoliy Tymoschuk
CM	8	Oleh Shelayev
RW	15	Artem Milevskyi	(yellow card) 67'	(substituted off) 72'
CF	7	Andriy Shevchenko (c)
LW	19	Maksym Kalynychenko	(yellow card) 21'
Substitutions:
FW	16	Andriy Vorobey		(substituted on) 20'
DF	17	Vladyslav Vashchuk		(substituted on) 45+2'
FW	20	Oleksiy Byelik		(substituted on) 72'
Manager:
Oleg Blokhin

Man of the Match:
Gennaro Gattuso (Italy)

Assistant referees:
Peter Hermans (Belgium)
Walter Vromans (Belgium)
Fourth official:
Toru Kamikawa (Japan)
Fifth official:
Yoshikazu Hiroshima (Japan)

=== England vs Portugal ===
1 July 2006
17:00

England	0–0 (a.e.t.)	Portugal
Penalties
Lampard (penalty missed); Hargreaves (penalty scored); Gerrard (penalty missed); Carragher (penalty missed)	1–3	(penalty scored) Simão; (penalty missed) Viana; (penalty missed) Petit; (penalty scored) Postiga; (penalty scored) Ronaldo

Arena AufSchalke, Gelsenkirchen
Attendance: 52,000
Referee: Horacio Elizondo (Argentina)

England	Portugal

GK	1	Paul Robinson
RB	2	Gary Neville
CB	5	Rio Ferdinand
CB	6	John Terry	(yellow card) 30'
LB	3	Ashley Cole
RM	7	David Beckham (c)		(substituted off) 52'
CM	4	Steven Gerrard
CM	16	Owen Hargreaves	(yellow card) 107'
CM	8	Frank Lampard
LM	11	Joe Cole		(substituted off) 65'
CF	9	Wayne Rooney	(red card) 62'
Substitutions:
MF	19	Aaron Lennon		(substituted on) 52'	(substituted off) 119'
FW	21	Peter Crouch		(substituted on) 65'
DF	15	Jamie Carragher			(substituted on) 119'
Manager:
(Sweden) Sven-Göran Eriksson

GK	1	Ricardo
RB	13	Miguel
CB	5	Fernando Meira
CB	16	Ricardo Carvalho	(yellow card) 111'
LB	14	Nuno Valente
CM	19	Tiago		(substituted off) 74'
CM	8	Petit	(yellow card) 44'
CM	18	Maniche
AM	7	Luís Figo (c)		(substituted off) 86'
AM	17	Cristiano Ronaldo
CF	9	Pauleta		(substituted off) 63'
Substitutions:
FW	11	Simão		(substituted on) 63'
MF	10	Hugo Viana		(substituted on) 74'
FW	23	Hélder Postiga		(substituted on) 86'
Manager:
(Brazil) Luiz Felipe Scolari

Man of the Match:
Owen Hargreaves (England)

Assistant referees:
Darío García (Argentina)
Rodolfo Otero (Argentina)
Fourth official:
Coffi Codjia (Benin)
Fifth official:
Aboudou Aderodjou (Benin)

=== Brazil vs France ===
External videos
- Brazil v France (Germany 2006) Full match on YouTube

Defending world champions Brazil went out in the quarter-finals after Zinedine Zidane found an unmarked Thierry Henry from a free kick, the striker having been given a free run at the ball after his marker, Roberto Carlos, stopped to tie his shoe.

1 July 2006
21:00

Brazil	0–1	France
		Henry 57'

Waldstadion, Frankfurt
Attendance: 48,000
Referee: Luis Medina Cantalejo (Spain)

Brazil	France

GK	1	Dida
RB	2	Cafu (c)	(yellow card) 25'	(substituted off) 76'
CB	3	Lúcio	(yellow card) 75'
CB	4	Juan	(yellow card) 45'
LB	6	Roberto Carlos
RM	17	Gilberto Silva
CM	8	Kaká		(substituted off) 79'
CM	19	Juninho		(substituted off) 63'
LM	11	Zé Roberto
SS	10	Ronaldinho
CF	9	Ronaldo	(yellow card) 45+2'
Substitutions:
FW	7	Adriano		(substituted on) 63'
DF	13	Cicinho		(substituted on) 76'
FW	23	Robinho		(substituted on) 79'
Manager:
Carlos Alberto Parreira

GK	16	Fabien Barthez
RB	19	Willy Sagnol	(yellow card) 74'
CB	15	Lilian Thuram	(yellow card) 88'
CB	5	William Gallas
LB	3	Eric Abidal
CM	4	Patrick Vieira
CM	6	Claude Makélélé
RW	22	Franck Ribéry		(substituted off) 77'
AM	10	Zinedine Zidane (c)
LW	7	Florent Malouda		(substituted off) 81'
CF	12	Thierry Henry		(substituted off) 86'
Substitutions:
FW	9	Sidney Govou		(substituted on) 77'
FW	11	Sylvain Wiltord		(substituted on) 81'
FW	14	Louis Saha	(yellow card) 87'	(substituted on) 86'
Manager:
Raymond Domenech

Man of the Match:
Zinedine Zidane (France)

Assistant referees:
Víctoriano Giráldez Carrasco (Spain)
Pedro Medina Hernández (Spain)
Fourth official:
Mark Shield (Australia)
Fifth official:
Ben Wilson (Australia)

== Semi-finals ==
=== Germany vs Italy ===
This was the fourth time that Italy defeated the host nation of tournament, after France in 1938, Mexico in 1970 and Argentina in 1978.

4 July 2006
21:00

Germany	0–2 (a.e.t.)	Italy
		Grosso 119'; Del Piero 120+1'

Westfalenstadion, Dortmund
Attendance: 65,000
Referee: Benito Archundia (Mexico)

Germany	Italy

GK	1	Jens Lehmann
RB	3	Arne Friedrich
CB	17	Per Mertesacker
CB	21	Christoph Metzelder	(yellow card) 56'
LB	16	Philipp Lahm
RM	19	Bernd Schneider		(substituted off) 83'
CM	13	Michael Ballack (c)
CM	5	Sebastian Kehl
LM	18	Tim Borowski	(yellow card) 40'	(substituted off) 73'
CF	11	Miroslav Klose		(substituted off) 111'
CF	20	Lukas Podolski
Substitutions:
MF	7	Bastian Schweinsteiger		(substituted on) 73'
MF	22	David Odonkor		(substituted on) 83'
FW	10	Oliver Neuville		(substituted on) 111'
Manager:
Jürgen Klinsmann

GK	1	Gianluigi Buffon
RB	19	Gianluca Zambrotta
CB	5	Fabio Cannavaro (c)
CB	23	Marco Materazzi
LB	3	Fabio Grosso
RM	16	Mauro Camoranesi	(yellow card) 90'	(substituted off) 91'
CM	21	Andrea Pirlo
CM	8	Gennaro Gattuso
LM	20	Simone Perrotta		(substituted off) 104'
AM	10	Francesco Totti
CF	9	Luca Toni		(substituted off) 74'
Substitutions:
FW	11	Alberto Gilardino		(substituted on) 74'
FW	15	Vincenzo Iaquinta		(substituted on) 91'
FW	7	Alessandro Del Piero		(substituted on) 104'
Manager:
Marcello Lippi

Man of the Match:
Andrea Pirlo (Italy)

Assistant referees:
José Ramírez (Mexico)
Héctor Vergara (Canada)
Fourth official:
Toru Kamikawa (Japan)
Fifth official:
Yoshikazu Hiroshima (Japan)

=== Portugal vs France ===
5 July 2006
21:00

Portugal	0–1	France
		Zidane 33' (pen.)

Allianz Arena, Munich
Attendance: 66,000
Referee: Jorge Larrionda (Uruguay)

Portugal	France

GK	1	Ricardo
RB	13	Miguel		(substituted off) 62'
CB	5	Fernando Meira
CB	16	Ricardo Carvalho	(yellow card) 83'
LB	14	Nuno Valente
CM	6	Costinha		(substituted off) 75'
CM	18	Maniche
RW	7	Luís Figo (c)
AM	20	Deco
LW	17	Cristiano Ronaldo
CF	9	Pauleta		(substituted off) 68'
Substitutions:
DF	2	Paulo Ferreira		(substituted on) 62'
FW	11	Simão		(substituted on) 68'
FW	23	Hélder Postiga		(substituted on) 75'
Manager:
(Brazil) Luiz Felipe Scolari

GK	16	Fabien Barthez
RB	19	Willy Sagnol
CB	15	Lilian Thuram
CB	5	William Gallas
LB	3	Eric Abidal
CM	4	Patrick Vieira
CM	6	Claude Makélélé
RW	22	Franck Ribéry		(substituted off) 72'
AM	10	Zinedine Zidane (c)
LW	7	Florent Malouda		(substituted off) 69'
CF	12	Thierry Henry		(substituted off) 85'
Substitutions:
FW	11	Sylvain Wiltord		(substituted on) 69'
FW	9	Sidney Govou		(substituted on) 72'
FW	14	Louis Saha	(yellow card) 87'	(substituted on) 85'
Manager:
Raymond Domenech

Man of the Match:
Lilian Thuram (France)

Assistant referees:
Wálter Rial (Uruguay)
Pablo Fandino (Uruguay)
Fourth official:
Mark Shield (Australia)
Fifth official:
Nathan Gibson (Australia)

== Match for third place ==
This was the third time that Portugal lost to the host nation of tournament, after England in 1966 and South Korea in 2002.

8 July 2006
21:00

Germany	3–1	Portugal
Schweinsteiger 56', 78'; Petit 60' (o.g.)		Nuno Gomes 88'

Gottlieb-Daimler-Stadion, Stuttgart
Attendance: 52,000
Referee: Toru Kamikawa (Japan)

Germany	Portugal

GK	12	Oliver Kahn (c)
RB	16	Philipp Lahm
CB	6	Jens Nowotny
CB	21	Christoph Metzelder
LB	2	Marcell Jansen
RM	19	Bernd Schneider
CM	5	Sebastian Kehl
CM	8	Torsten Frings	(yellow card) 7'
LM	7	Bastian Schweinsteiger	(yellow card) 78'	(substituted off) 79'
CF	11	Miroslav Klose		(substituted off) 65'
CF	20	Lukas Podolski		(substituted off) 71'
Substitutions:
FW	10	Oliver Neuville		(substituted on) 65'
FW	9	Mike Hanke		(substituted on) 71'
MF	15	Thomas Hitzlsperger		(substituted on) 79'
Manager:
Jürgen Klinsmann

GK	1	Ricardo
RB	2	Paulo Ferreira	(yellow card) 60'
CB	5	Fernando Meira
CB	4	Ricardo Costa	(yellow card) 24'
LB	14	Nuno Valente		(substituted off) 69'
CM	6	Costinha	(yellow card) 33'	(substituted off) 46'
CM	18	Maniche
RW	17	Cristiano Ronaldo
AM	20	Deco
LW	11	Simão
CF	9	Pauleta (c)		(substituted off) 77'
Substitutions:
MF	8	Petit		(substituted on) 46'
FW	21	Nuno Gomes		(substituted on) 69'
MF	7	Luís Figo		(substituted on) 77'
Manager:
(Brazil) Luiz Felipe Scolari

Man of the Match:
Bastian Schweinsteiger (Germany)

Assistant referees:
Yoshikazu Hiroshima (Japan)
Kim Dae-young (South Korea)
Fourth official:
Coffi Codjia (Benin)
Fifth official:
Celestin Ntagungira (Rwanda)

== Final ==
9 July 2006
20:00 CEST

Italy	1–1 (a.e.t.)	France
Materazzi 19'		Zidane 7' (pen.)
Penalties
Pirlo (penalty scored); Materazzi (penalty scored); De Rossi (penalty scored); Del Piero (penalty scored); Grosso (penalty scored)	5–3	(penalty scored) Wiltord; (penalty missed) Trezeguet; (penalty scored) Abidal; (penalty scored) Sagnol

Olympiastadion, Berlin
Attendance: 69,000
Referee: Horacio Elizondo (Argentina)

Italy	France

GK	1	Gianluigi Buffon
RB	19	Gianluca Zambrotta	(yellow card) 5'
CB	5	Fabio Cannavaro (c)
CB	23	Marco Materazzi
LB	3	Fabio Grosso
RM	16	Mauro Camoranesi		(substituted off) 86'
CM	8	Gennaro Gattuso
CM	21	Andrea Pirlo
LM	20	Simone Perrotta		(substituted off) 61'
AM	10	Francesco Totti		(substituted off) 61'
CF	9	Luca Toni
Substitutions:
MF	4	Daniele De Rossi		(substituted on) 61'
FW	15	Vincenzo Iaquinta		(substituted on) 61'
FW	7	Alessandro Del Piero		(substituted on) 86'
Manager:
Marcello Lippi

GK	16	Fabien Barthez
RB	19	Willy Sagnol	(yellow card) 12'
CB	15	Lilian Thuram
CB	5	William Gallas
LB	3	Eric Abidal
CM	4	Patrick Vieira		(substituted off) 56'
CM	6	Claude Makélélé	(yellow card) 76'
RW	22	Franck Ribéry		(substituted off) 100'
AM	10	Zinedine Zidane (c)	(red card) 110'
LW	7	Florent Malouda	(yellow card) 111'
CF	12	Thierry Henry		(substituted off) 107'
Substitutions:
MF	18	Alou Diarra		(substituted on) 56'
FW	20	David Trezeguet		(substituted on) 100'
FW	11	Sylvain Wiltord		(substituted on) 107'
Manager:
Raymond Domenech

Man of the Match:
Andrea Pirlo (Italy)

Assistant referees:
Darío García (Argentina)
Rodolfo Otero (Argentina)
Fourth official:
Luis Medina Cantalejo (Spain)
Fifth official:
Víctoriano Giráldez Carrasco (Spain)
