= Toru Kamikawa =

Japanese football referee

- Born: June 8, 1963 (age 63); Kagoshima, Kagoshima Prefecture, Japan

Domestic
| Years | League | Role |
| 1996-2007 | J. League | Referee |

International
| Years | League | Role |
| 1998-2007 | FIFA listed | Referee |

Toru Kamikawa (上川徹, Kamikawa Tōru; born June 8, 1963) is a former Japanese football (soccer) referee, debuting in Japan's professional J. League in 1996.

Kamikawa was born in Kagoshima, Kagoshima Prefecture. An international referee since 1998, he refereed one match at the 2002 FIFA World Cup and three matches at the 2006 FIFA World Cup.

In the 2002 World Cup, he refereed a first round match between Ireland and Cameroon.

In the 2006 World Cup, he refereed first round matches between Poland and Ecuador in Group A, and between England and Trinidad and Tobago in Group B. He also refereed the match for third place between Germany and Portugal.

He was the AFC Referee of the Year in 2002, and the J. League Referee of the Year in 2003 and 2006.

Kamikawa became the first Asian referee to officiate a Russian Premier League match when he refereed a match between Luch-Energia Vladivostok and Spartak Moscow on August 20, 2006, in Vladivostok.

Before becoming a referee, he played football as a forward. He was educated at and played for Kagoshima National College of Technology and Tokai University. He represented Japan at an underage level in 1981. After the graduation, he joined Japan Soccer League side Fujita S.C. (current Shonan Bellmare) and finished his playing career there in 1991.

He announced his retirement from the international game in October 2006 partly because of his knee injury although he still had two years before he reached the mandatory retirement age of an international referee. He quit refereeing entirely in January 2007. He now works for the Japan Football Association to help younger referees to develop their skills.
