= Horacio Elizondo =

Argentine football referee (born 1963)

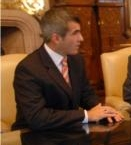
- Full name: Horacio Marcelo Elizondo
- Born: 4 November 1963 (age 62); Argentina
- Other occupation: Physical education teacher

Domestic
Years	League	Role
1992–2006	Argentine Primera División	Referee

International
Years	League	Role
1994–2006	FIFA listed	Referee

Horacio Marcelo Elizondo (born 4 November 1963) is an Argentine former international football referee best known for officiating matches in the 2006 FIFA World Cup, including the final. Having achieved all his goals in refereeing, Elizondo retired after the December 2006 match between Boca Juniors and Lanús, two years before the compulsory retirement age of 45.

== Career ==
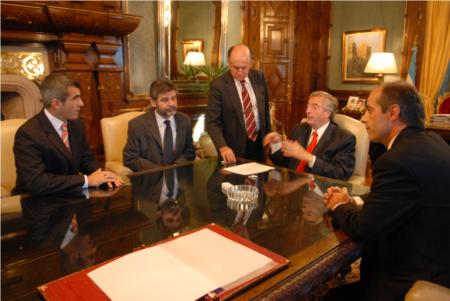
Elizondo (first from the left) with the president Néstor Kirchner in 2007.

Elizondo completed studies in physical education, and started refereeing after finishing the AFA course. His debut in the Argentine first division was in the Deportivo Español vs. Belgrano de Córdoba match in 1992. He was named international in 1994, and directed his first international match on October 9, 1996, between Ecuador and Colombia for the 1998 World Cup qualifications.

Among the several international competitions in which he participated are the Copa América of 1997 and 1999, the U-17 World Cup of 1997 and 2005, the U-20 World Youth Championships of 2003 and 2005, the Olympic Games of 2004, and the FIFA Club World Championship of 2000. In the latter, he showed a red card to David Beckham in the tie between Manchester United and Necaxa.

Elizondo refereed in the final matches of the 2002 and 2005 Copa Libertadores de América. In the 2005 tournament the two Brazilian finalist teams São Paulo FC and Atlético Paranaense lobbied Conmebol to have Elizondo as the main referee. On August 16, 2006, Elizondo refereed the second leg of the final of the 2006 Copa Libertadores.

Elizondo broke the Argentine First Division record showing 12 yellow cards on August 19 in the match between Boca Juniors and Independiente. The media, though, supported most of his decisions. In the annual world referee ranking of the International Federation of Football History and Statistics (IFFHS), Elizondo was positioned 5th in 2001, 12th in 2005, and 1st in 2006.

=== 2006 FIFA World Cup ===
Elizondo was appointed to represent Argentina in the 2006 FIFA World Cup, together with fellow assistants Darío García and Rodolfo Otero. He officiated three group games: Germany vs Costa Rica, Czech Republic vs Ghana, and Switzerland vs South Korea. He also took charge of the England vs Portugal quarterfinal, as well as the final game between Italy and France, becoming the first referee in World Cup history to referee both the opening and final games of one World Cup, a feat later matched by compatriot Néstor Pitana in the 2018 edition (English referee George Reader also officiated the first and last matches of the 1950 FIFA World Cup in Brazil, but the last one, known as Maracanazo, was not technically a final). Elizondo handed out a total of 29 cards in the tournament, three of which were red, for an average of 5.8 cards per game.

Elizondo took charge of the opening game of the tournament between Germany and Costa Rica, which Germany won 4–2. Elizondo handed out one yellow card to Costa Rica’s Danny Fonseca. The match had a total of 22 fouls and 6 offsides, both statistics split evenly between the two teams. FIFA's president of the World cup organizing committee Lennart Johansson praised Elizondo performance at the match, saying "I did not notice him much which is a very good thing."

In his following match in the group stage, which Ghana won 2–0 against Czech Republic, Elizondo gave a straight red card to Czech player Tomáš Ujfaluši for a professional foul in the box, awarding a penalty to Ghana. He then gave a yellow card to Asamoah Gyan when he took the penalty kick prematurely. Gyan missed his second attempt. Elizondo also booked Czech player Vratislav Lokvenc and Ghanaian players Otto Addo, Michael Essien, Derek Boateng and Sulley Muntari, for a total of seven cards. He called 12 fouls against the Czech Republic and 20 against Ghana. He further ruled the Czechs offside 6 times and Ghanaians 9 times.

Elizondo was also the referee in the Switzerland 2–0 South Korea group game. Elizondo handed out nine yellow cards during the match, booking five Swiss players, Philippe Senderos, Hakan Yakın, Raphael Wicky, Christoph Spycher and Johan Djourou and four Koreans Park Chu-Young, Kim Jin-Kyu, Choi Jin-Cheul and Lee Chun-Soo. Elizondo called 7 fouls against Switzerland and 19 against South Korea. There were a total of six offsides calls, split evenly between the two teams.

Elizondo awarded the Swiss a goal when he overruled the assistant referee Rodolfo Otero's raised offside flag. Several players, including two defenders, Kim Jin-Kyu and Choi Jin-Cheul, who were following Alexander Frei stopped playing when they saw the flag. The ball was put into the path of Alexander Frei after being hit by Lee Ho's foot. Korea's coach Dick Advocaat was livid at the time, but a few days later agreed that the decision to allow the goal was correct.

Elizondo was the referee in the England 0–0 Portugal quarter-final, which Portugal won 3–1 on penalties. Elizondo gave yellow cards to Ricardo Carvalho and Petit of Portugal and to Owen Hargreaves and John Terry of England, as well as a straight red card to England's Wayne Rooney after he stood on Ricardo Carvalho's groin, for a total of 5 cards. Elizondo called 18 fouls on England and 10 on Portugal, found Portugal offsides 3 times and England none.

==== World Cup final ====
Elizondo was the referee for the final of the tournament in Berlin's Olympiastadion on July 9, between France and Italy. He awarded France a penalty after Florent Malouda went down in the box under contact from Marco Materazzi. Italy won the match 5–3 on penalties following a 1–1 after extra-time. Elizondo gave Zinedine Zidane a red card after he headbutted Marco Materazzi in the chest during the 111th minute after consulting fourth official Luis Medina Cantalejo via headset.

== Statistics ==
Event	Games	Yellow card	Yellowred card	Red card
2006 Copa Libertadores	6	31	2	2
2006 FIFA World Cup qualification (CONMEBOL)	9	28	0	1
2006 FIFA World Cup	5	26	0	3
Total	20	85	2	6

== Major matches refereed ==
Date	Match	Tournament	Venue	Result	Ref
July 24, 2002	Olimpia vs. São Caetano	2002 Copa Libertadores finals (1st leg)	Estadio Defensores del Chaco, Asunción	0–1 (2–2 on aggregate; Olimpia won 4–2 on penalties)	
July 14, 2005	São Paulo vs. Atlético Paranaense	2005 Copa Libertadores finals (2nd leg)	Estádio do Morumbi, São Paulo	4–0 (5–1 on aggregate)	
July 9, 2006	Italy vs. France	2006 FIFA World Cup final	Olympiastadion, Berlin	1–1 (5–3 on penalties)	
August 16, 2006	Internacional vs. São Paulo	2006 Copa Libertadores finals (2nd leg)	Estádio Beira-Rio, Porto Alegre	2–2 (4–3 on aggregate)	

== Honours ==
- IFFHS World's Best Referee: 2006

Sporting positions (Argentina) Horacio Elizondo
Preceded by 2002 FIFA World Cup Final (Italy) Pierluigi Collina	2006 FIFA World Cup Final Referee	Succeeded by 2010 FIFA World Cup Final (England) Howard Webb
