= Luis Medina Cantalejo =

Spanish former football referee (born 1964)

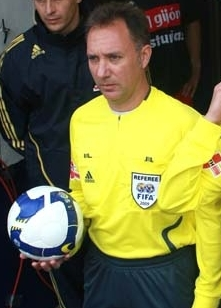
- Medina Cantalejo in 2009
- Full name: Luis Medina Cantalejo
- Born: 1 March 1964 (age 62); Seville, Spain
- Other occupation: Sports assessor

Domestic
- Years: League

International
- Years: League
- 2004–2009: UEFA

Luis Medina Cantalejo (born 1 March 1964) is a Spanish former football referee.

He was one of the few officials allowed to officiate the domestic clashes between Real Madrid and Barcelona. His first experience as an international referee came on 4 September 2004, between Turkey and Georgia, in a preliminary qualifier for the 2006 FIFA World Cup.

== Career ==
On 21 August 2005, Medina Cantalejo referred the Russian Premier League match between CSKA Moscow and Zenit St.Petersburg.

He was selected to officiate the playoff between Uruguay and Australia for the final spot in the World Cup on 16 November 2005.

He was promoted at the last minute to officiate matches at the finals of the 2006 FIFA World Cup after assistants of two other referees failed to meet the FIFA standards. He subsequently officiated three matches at the 2006 FIFA World Cup: Germany v. Poland, Netherlands v. Argentina, and Italy v. Australia. In the round of 16 match between Italy and Australia, he made some controversial decisions, including showing Italy's Marco Materazzi a straight red card for a challenge on Australia's Mark Bresciano, and later awarded an injury time penalty to Italy after adjudging Australian defender Lucas Neill to have fouled Italian full back Fabio Grosso in the penalty area; Francesco Totti converted the ensuing spot kick to score and give the Italians a 1–0 victory.

Two days after the Australia–Italy game, FIFA announced that Medina was one of the twelve referees retained for the remainder of the tournament. He refereed the quarter-final between Brazil and France on 1 July.

Medina Cantalejo was appointed as fourth official for the FIFA World Cup Final between Italy and France and was involved in another important decision during the final, as none of the three officials on the field saw Zinedine Zidane headbutting Marco Materazzi. He informed referee Horacio Elizondo what had happened via headset. The French captain was then shown the red card.

Medina Cantalejo was chosen to officiate the 2008 UEFA European Championship qualifying match between England and Russia.

On 20 May 2009, Medina refereed the UEFA Cup Final between Shakhtar Donetsk and Werder Bremen.

== Personal life ==
Professionally, Medina Cantalejo is a sports assessor who lives in Tomares, west of Seville.

Preceded by UEFA Cup Final 2008; Peter Fröjdfeldt	UEFA Cup Final Referees; Final 2009; Luis Medina Cantalejo	Succeeded by UEFA Europa League Final 2010; Nicola Rizzoli
