= Arena AufSchalke =

Stadium in Gelsenkirchen, Germany

Coordinates: 51°33′16″N 7°4′3″E

Veltins-Arena

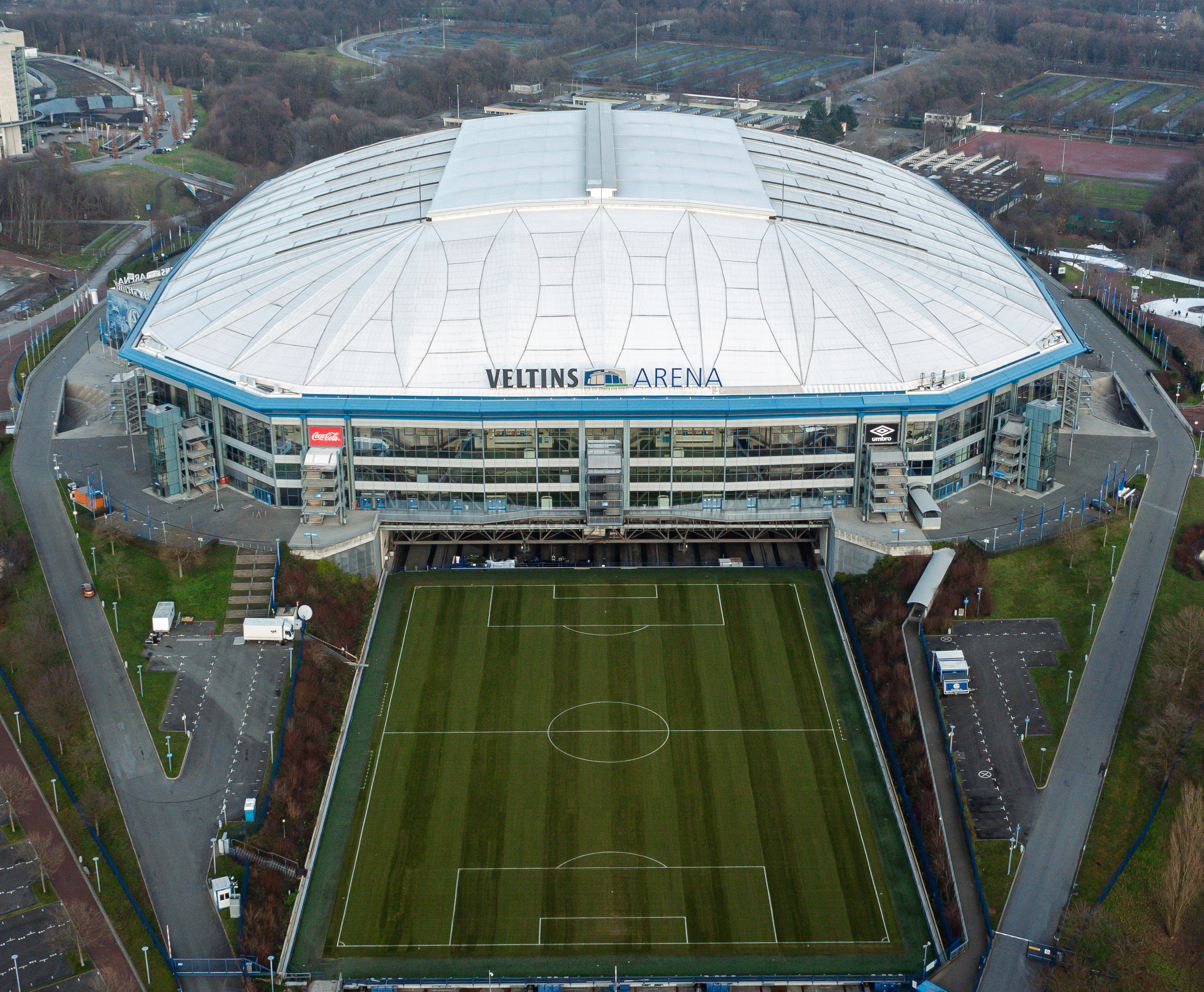
- Exterior of the Veltins-Arena
- Interactive map of Veltins-Arena
- Former names: Arena AufSchalke (2001–2005)
- Location: Gelsenkirchen, North Rhine-Westphalia, Germany
- Elevation: 54 m (177 ft)
- Owner: FC Schalke 04
- Operator: FC Schalke 04
- Capacity: 62,271 (league matches), 54,740 (international matches)
- Roof: Retractable
- Record attendance: 77,803 (7 May 2010, opening game of the 2010 IIHF World Championship)
- Field size: 105 × 68 m
- Public transit: 302 Veltins Arena

Construction
- Built: 1998–2001
- Opened: 13 August 2001
- Cost: €191 million
- Architects: Hentrich, Petschnigg und Partner

Tenants
- FC Schalke 04 (2001–present); FC Shakhtar Donetsk (2024–25 UEFA Champions League); Germany national football team (selected matches)

Website
- veltins-arena.de/en/

Arena AufSchalke (German pronunciation: [aˈʁeːnaː ʔaʊfˈʃalkə]), currently known as Veltins-Arena (pronounced [ˈfɛltɪnsʔaˌʁeːnaː]) for sponsorship reasons, is a football stadium with a retractable roof and slide-out pitch in Gelsenkirchen, North Rhine-Westphalia, Germany. It opened on 13 August 2001 as the new home ground of FC Schalke 04. The stadium has a capacity of 62,271 for league matches and 54,740 for international matches. Its naming rights were sold to the German brewery Veltins in July 2005.

The arena hosted the 2004 UEFA Champions League final, five matches at the 2006 FIFA World Cup, the opening game of the 2010 IIHF World Championship and four matches at UEFA Euro 2024. It is also used for concerts and other sporting events.

== History ==
Plans for a new multifunctional stadium were developed in the late 1990s to replace the outdated Parkstadion. After Schalke 04 won the 1996–97 UEFA Cup, and ahead of the club's centenary in 2004, the German construction firm HBM was awarded the construction contract in 1998.

== Site and layout ==
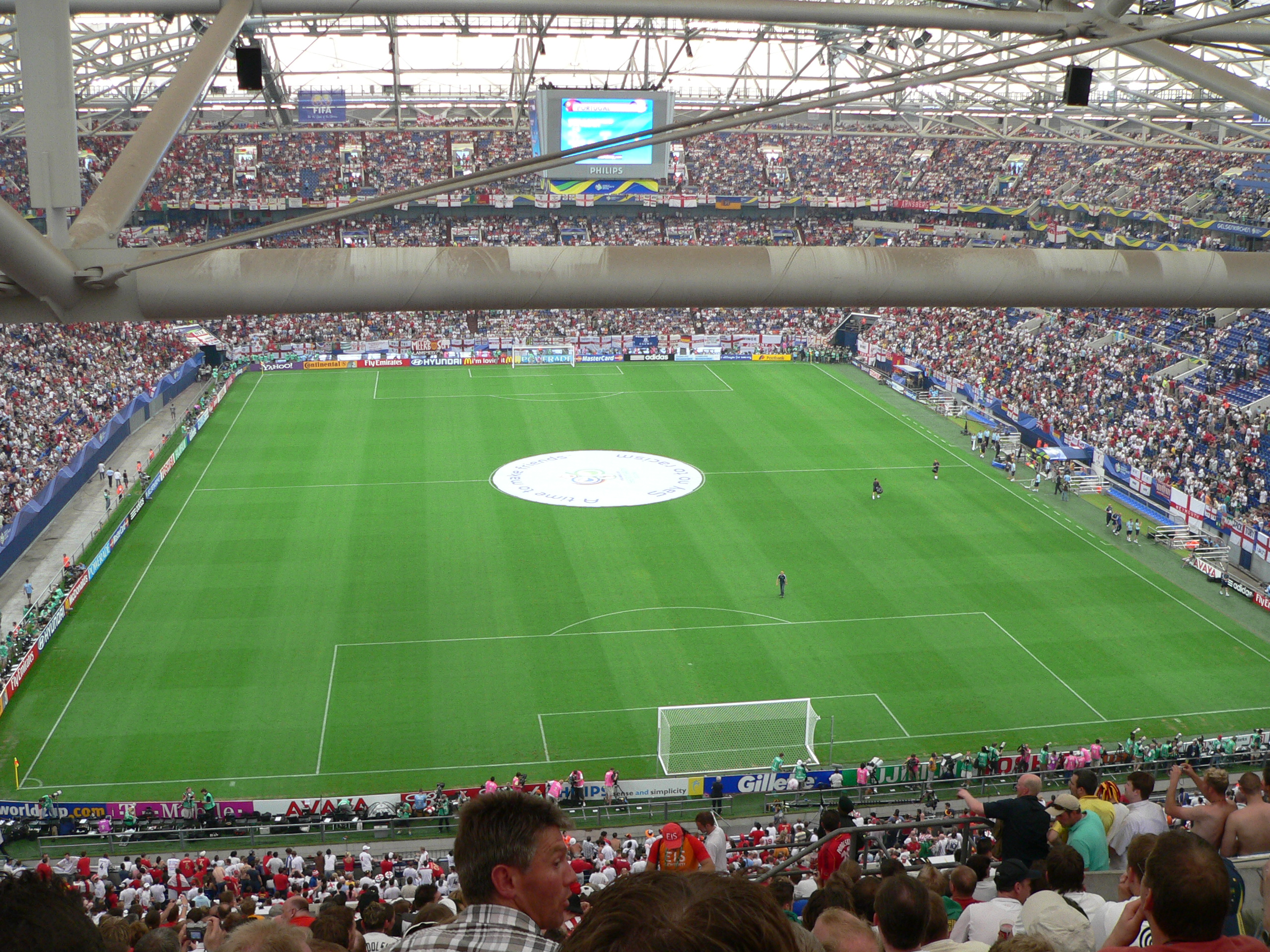
Interior view

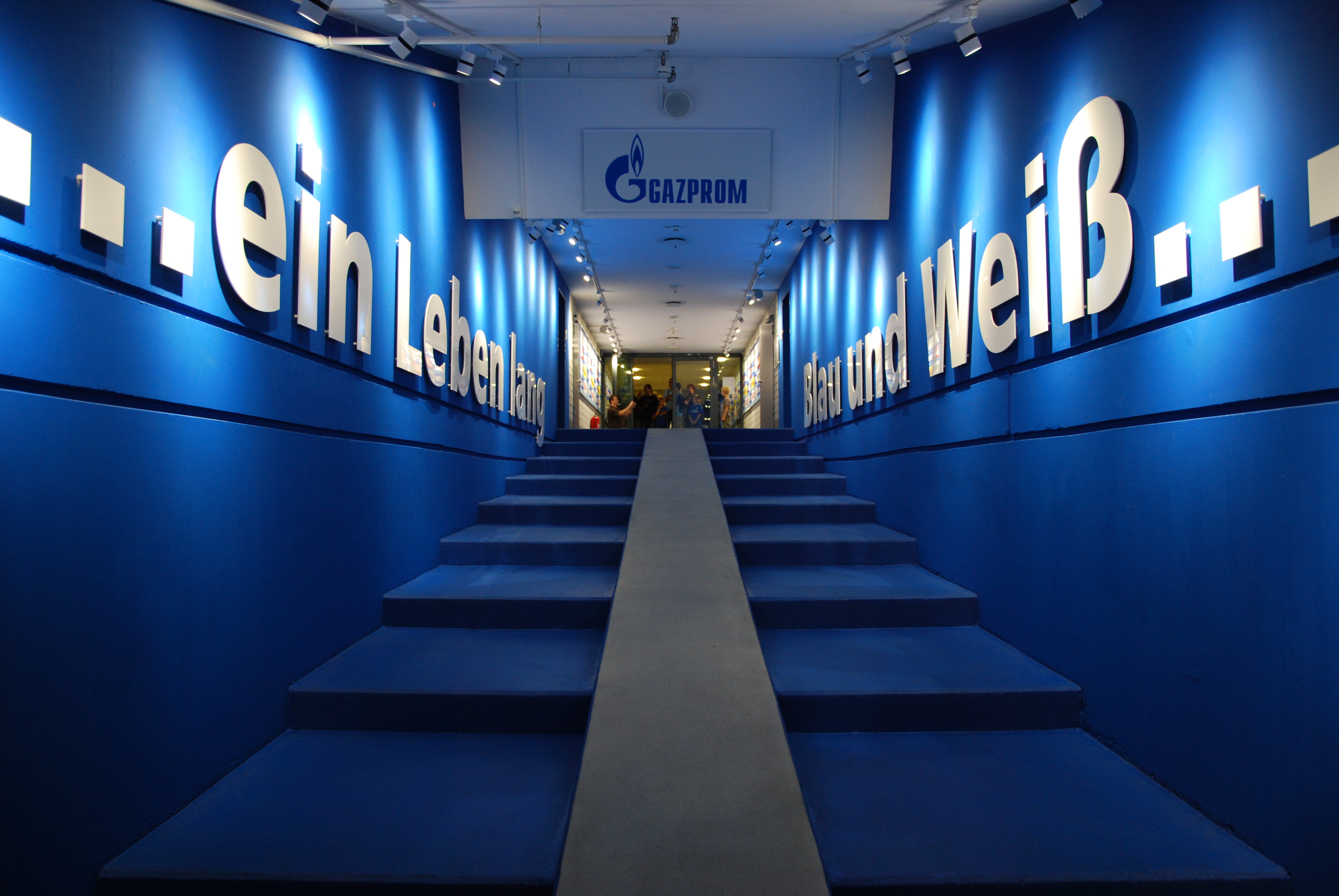
The players' tunnel (August 2011)

The site chosen for Schalke 04's new stadium is near the old Parkstadion, on club-owned property known as the "Berger Feld". Two mine shafts from the Consolidation and Hugo coal mines run beneath the site at a depth of 800 metres (2,600 ft). To reduce the structural risk associated with ground movement, the stadium's main axis was rotated from the conventional north–south arrangement to a northeast–southwest alignment, making the arena parallel to the mines.

The Veltins-Arena has two tiers that completely surround the playing field. It has a capacity of 62,271 for league matches, with standing and seated accommodation, and 54,740 for international matches, when the venue is all-seated. For league matches, the North Stand contains standing accommodation for 16,307 spectators; for international matches, the area is converted to 8,600 seats. The 72 VIP lounges form a ring around the stadium, separating the first tier from the second. A second level of lounges is located beneath the main belt of the western grandstand.

The stadium's foundation consists of cast concrete and 600,000 cubic metres (21,000,000 cu ft) of packed slag, a by-product of steel smelting. The slag was formed into mounds supporting the four main stands, which were built from prefabricated reinforced-concrete sections. Tunnels measuring 4.50-by-4.50-meter (14.8 ft × 14.8 ft) lead into the four corners of the arena. They provided access during construction and also ventilate the interior.

== Roof and pitch ==
The Veltins-Arena has a Teflon-coated fibreglass canvas retractable roof spanning the stadium. It is supported by a rectangular truss suspended above the pitch and connected to the main building by 24 steel pylons. The central section opens in two halves, allowing the pitch to be covered or exposed depending on the weather and event requirements. A second layer of Teflon-coated fibreglass canvas forms an air cushion designed to reduce exterior noise during concerts, which can reach 105 decibels. Four video screens hang 25 metres (82 ft) above the centre of the pitch, each with a surface area of 35 square metres (380 sq ft). The centrally suspended scoreboard was the first of its kind in a football stadium.

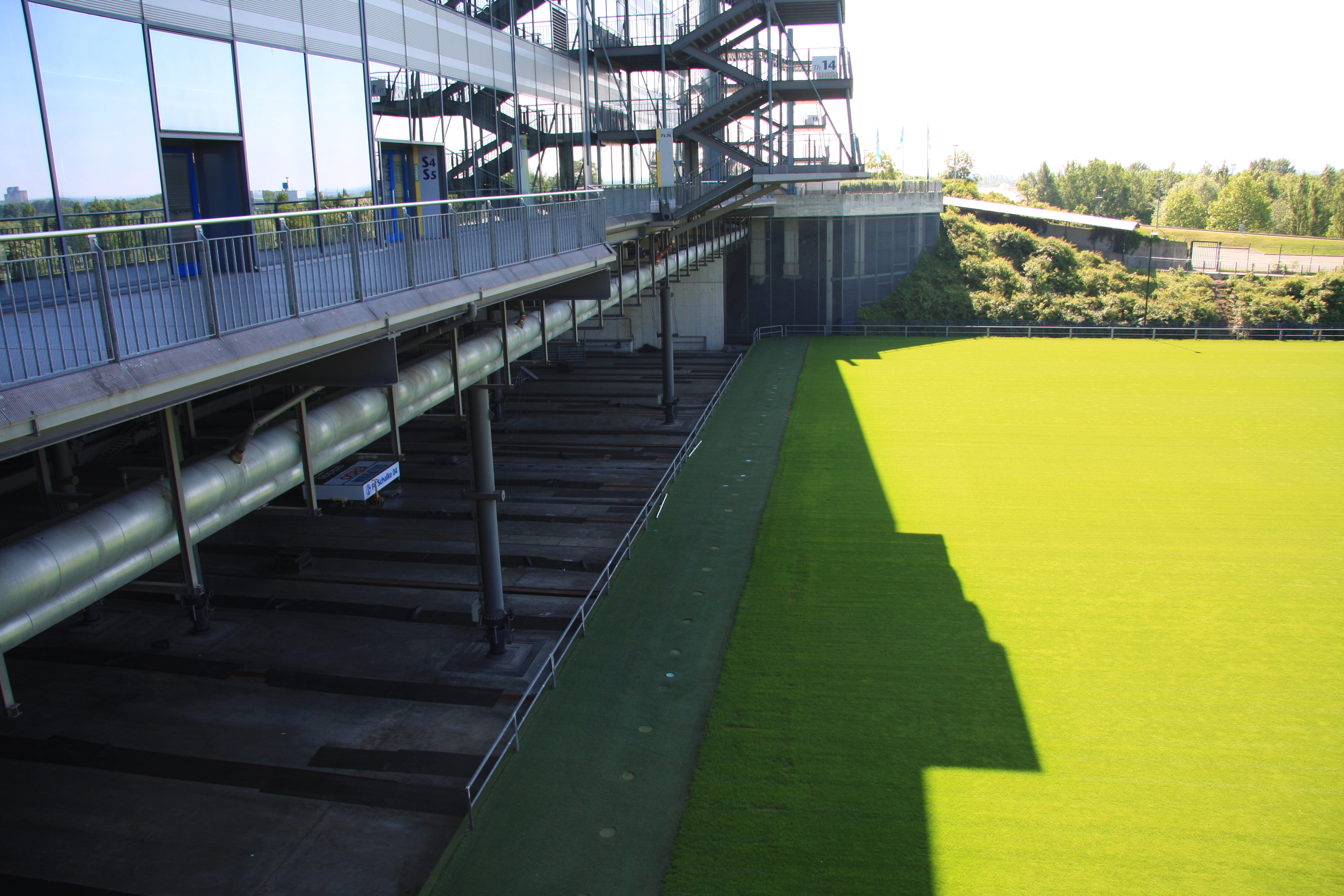
An exterior view of the slide-out pitch beneath the southern wing

Like the Sapporo Dome in Japan, the State Farm Stadium and Allegiant Stadium in the U.S. and the GelreDome in the Netherlands, the Veltins-Arena features a slide-out pitch. Supported by a 11,400-tonne (11,200-long-ton; 12,600-short-ton) substructure, the playing field can be moved in and out of the stadium within four hours. This has several advantages:

- The grass can grow outdoors with natural light and air circulation.
- The football pitch is not damaged during indoor events such as concerts.
- The floor of the multifunctional hall can be converted and retrofitted for different events.
- The outdoor area left vacant by the pitch can be used for bus parking during football matches.

== Catering and venues ==
The Veltins-Arena contains a range of catering facilities for more than 60,000 spectators. Its 15 small restaurants, 50 grilling stations and 35 cafés can serve up to 2,500 kilograms (5,500 lb) of sausages, 7,000 pretzels and 1,000 square metres (11,000 sq ft) of pizza in one day. The catering areas are connected by a 5-kilometre (3.1 mi) beer line capable of supplying approximately 52,000 litres (11,000 imp gal; 14,000 US gal) per match day.

== Other events ==
The Veltins-Arena has hosted major events in football and other sports. These include the 2004 UEFA Champions League final between AS Monaco and Porto, which drew more than 53,000 spectators. During the 2024–25 UEFA Champions League, the stadium served as the temporary home venue of Ukrainian side Shakhtar Donetsk because of the Russian invasion of Ukraine.

Following the demolition of the Rheinstadion in Düsseldorf, Arena AufSchalke served as the home venue of the Rhein Fire of NFL Europe during the 2003 and 2004 seasons. It also hosted World Bowl XII in 2004. In May of that year, the arena hosted a pop concert, a Bundesliga match and an NFL Europe game within 96 hours.

Other events have included the biathlon World Team Challenge exhibition race, stock car races and operas. In June 2009, the arena hosted a world heavyweight championship boxing match between Wladimir Klitschko and Ruslan Chagaev, which drew an audience of 60,000. The following year, Wladimir's older brother and WBC champion Vitali fought in May against Albert Sosnowski.

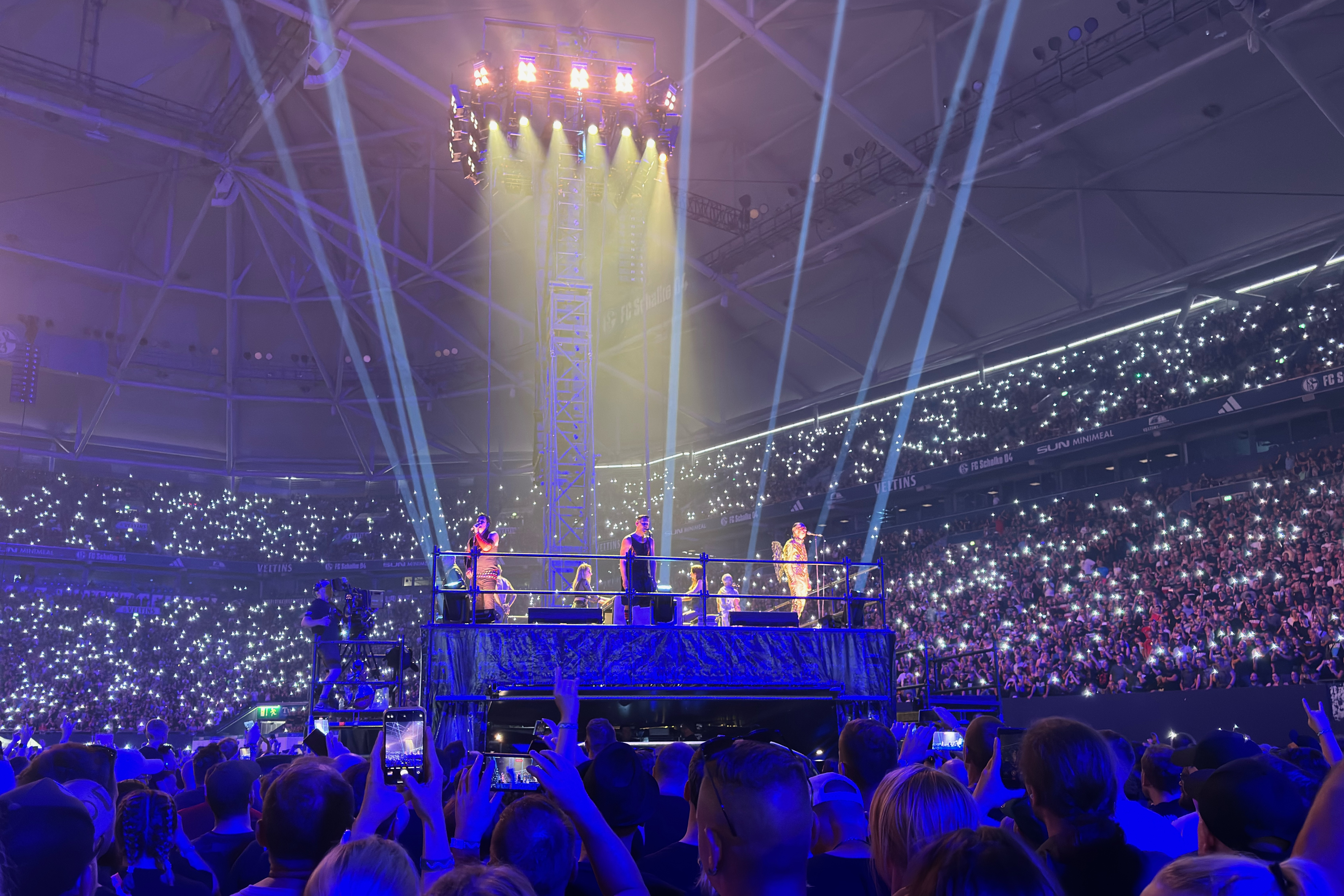
Rammstein performing at the Veltins-Arena on 30 July 2024

=== 2006 FIFA World Cup ===
The stadium was one of the venues for the 2006 World Cup. Because FIFA controlled sponsorship associated with the tournament, including venue sponsorship, the arena was called FIFA World Cup Stadium Gelsenkirchen (German: FIFA WM-Stadion Gelsenkirchen; [ˈfiːfa ˈvɛltmaɪ̯stɐʃaftˌʃtaːdi̯ɔn ɡɛlzn̩ˈkɪʁçn̩]) during the competition.

The following matches were played at the stadium during the 2006 World Cup:

Date	Time (CEST)	Team #1	Result	Team #2	Round	Attendance
9 June 2006	21:00	Poland	0–2	Ecuador	Group A	52,000
12 June 2006	18:00	United States	0–3	Czech Republic	Group E	52,000
16 June 2006	15:00	Argentina	6–0	Serbia and Montenegro	Group C	52,000
21 June 2006	16:00	Portugal	2–1	Mexico	Group D	52,000
1 July 2006	17:00	England	0–0 (a.e.t.) (1–3 pen)	Portugal	Quarter-finals	52,000

=== Speedway ===
2007 Speedway Grand Prix of Germany

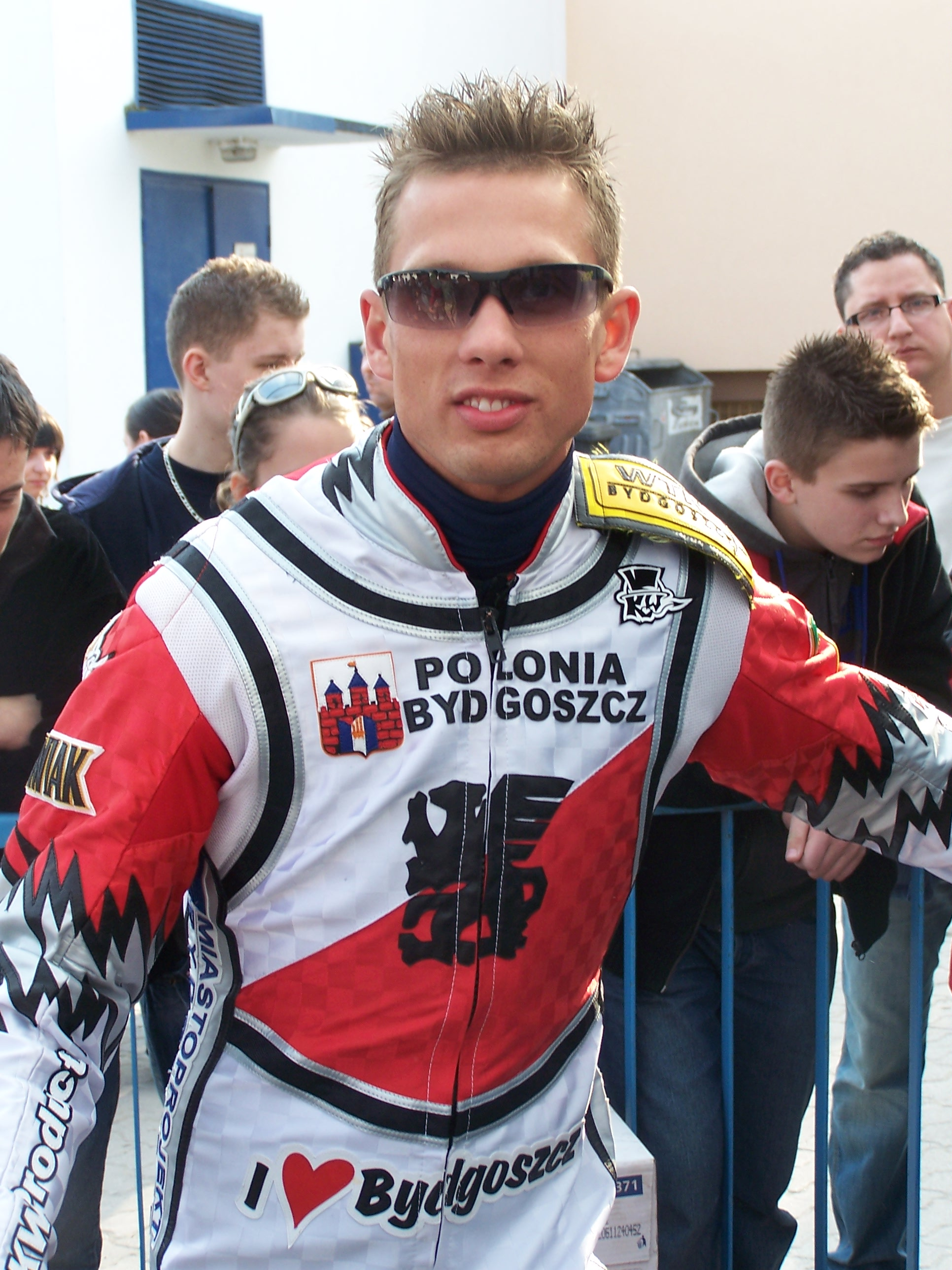
Andreas Jonsson, winner of the 2007 German Speedway Grand Prix

The Veltins-Arena hosted the final round of the 2007 motorcycle speedway World Championship season on 13 October 2007. The 2007 Speedway Grand Prix of Germany was the 100th Grand Prix in the history of the competition and was billed as "the richest minute in motorsport". Its winner, Swedish rider Andreas Jonsson, received US$100,000 for winning the final heat, which lasted about one minute. Jonsson defeated American rider Greg Hancock and Australians Jason Crump and Leigh Adams in the final. Nicki Pedersen, who was eliminated in the semi-final, was crowned world champion.

The temporary speedway track at the Veltins-Arena was 300 metres (330 yards) in length. Andreas Jonsson and Greg Hancock jointly hold the four-lap record, having set a time of 56.9 seconds in heats 21 and 23 respectively.

2008 Speedway Grand Prix of Germany The Veltins-Arena was scheduled to host the 2008 Speedway Grand Prix of Germany on 11 October 2008. The meeting was cancelled after the Fédération Internationale de Motocyclisme (FIM) jury deemed the temporary track unsafe because of adverse weather conditions during its construction, despite the retractable roof being closed. The event was restaged at the Polonia Stadium in Bydgoszcz, Poland, on 18 October and renamed the 2008 FIM Final Speedway Grand Prix.

=== 2010 Ice Hockey World Championship ===
The opening game of the 74th IIHF World Championship took place at the Veltins-Arena on 7 May 2010. On that occasion, the crowd of 77,803 set a then-world record for ice hockey attendance. Host nation Germany defeated the United States 2–1 in overtime.

=== 2018 German Darts Masters ===
The stadium hosted the 2018 German Darts Masters, which set a darts attendance record of 20,210. The event was won by Mensur Suljović.

=== UEFA Euro 2024 ===
The stadium was one of the venues for UEFA Euro 2024. During the tournament, it used its non-sponsored name, Arena AufSchalke.

The following matches were played at the stadium:

Date	Time (CEST)	Team #1	Result	Team #2	Round	Spectators
16 June 2024	21:00	Serbia	0–1	England	Group C	48,953
20 June 2024	21:00	Spain	1–0	Italy	Group B	49,528
26 June 2024	21:00	Georgia	2–0	Portugal	Group F	49,616
30 June 2024	18:00	England	2–1 (a.e.t.)	Slovakia	Round of 16	47,244

== Influence on other stadiums ==
The Veltins-Arena served as a model for State Farm Stadium, which also has a retractable roof and slide-out pitch.

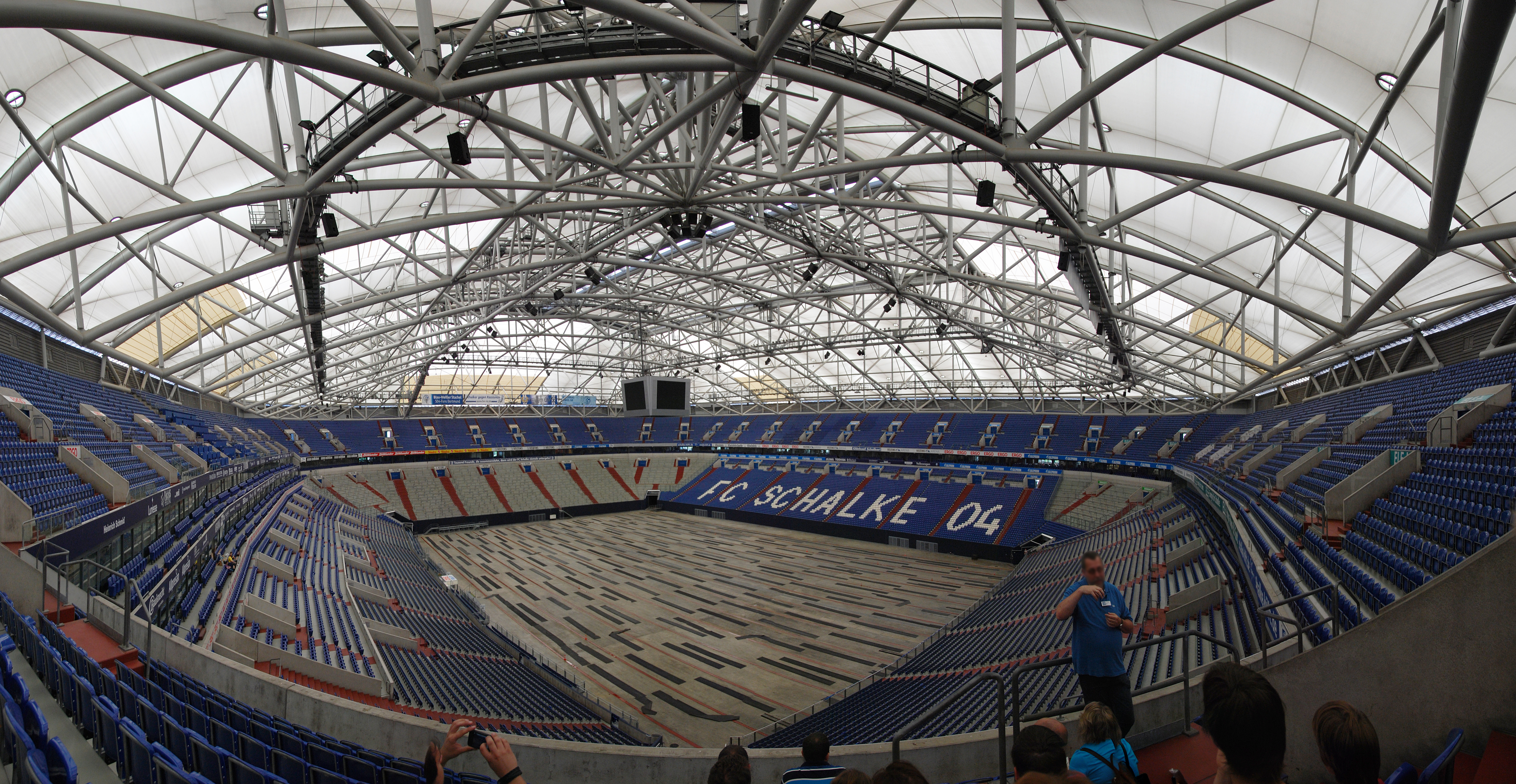
Interior panorama of the Veltins-Arena

== Selected average attendances ==
Tenants	Tier	League season	Home games	Average attendance
Schalke 04	2nd	2023–24	17	61,388
Schalke 04	1st	2022–23	17	61,133
Schalke 04	1st	2018–19	17	60,941
Schalke 04	1st	2017–18	17	61,197
Schalke 04	1st	2016–17	17	60,703

== See also ==
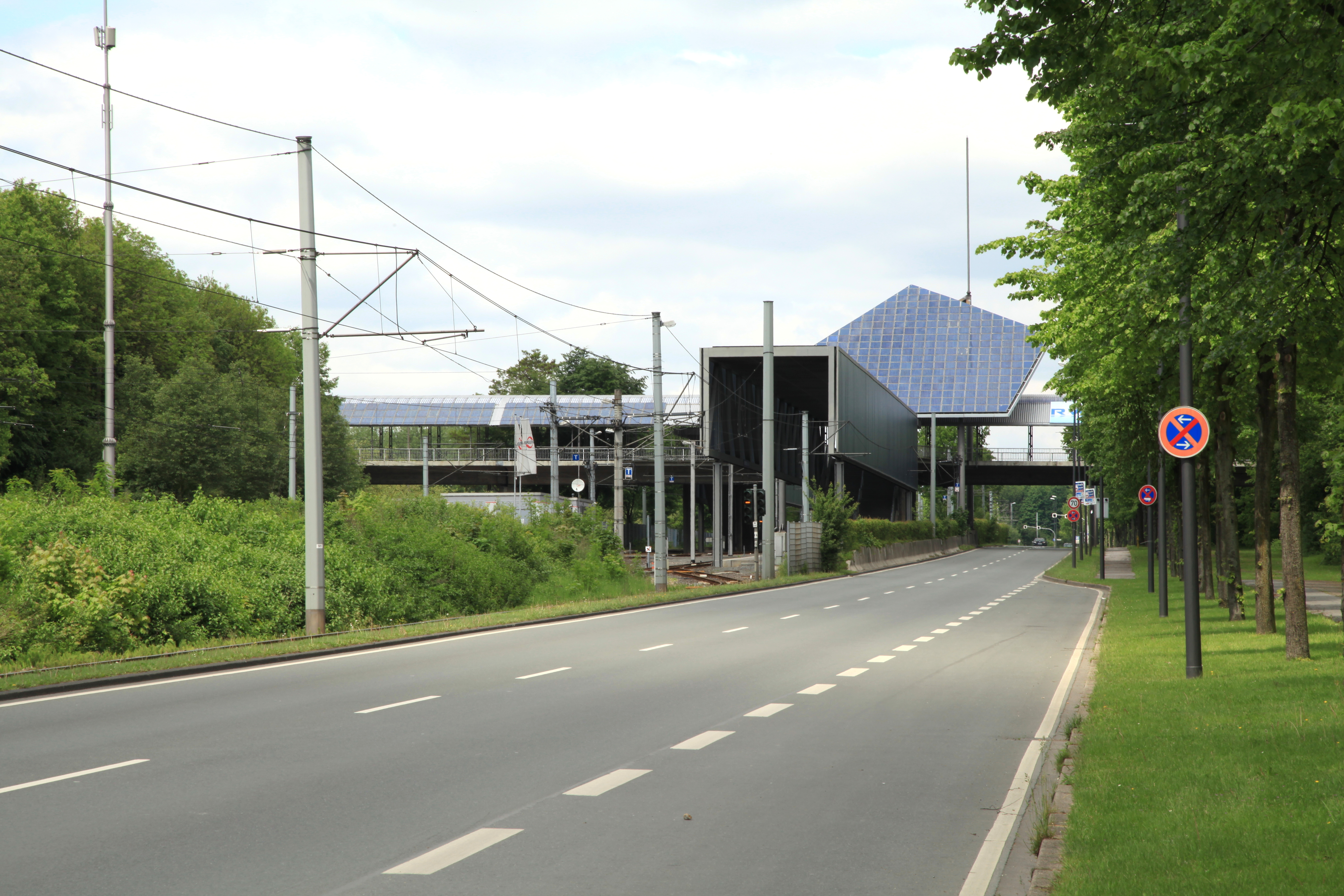
The Veltins Arena stop on the Bochum Stadtbahn, with services to Gelsenkirchen Hauptbahnhof

- Speedway Grand Prix of Germany
- Lists of stadiums

Preceded by Old Trafford; Manchester	UEFA Champions League; Final venue; 2004	Succeeded by Atatürk Olympic Stadium; Istanbul
