= Edwin Tenorio =

Ecuadorian footballer (born 1976)

Personal information
- Full name: Edwin Rolando Tenorio Montaño
- Date of birth: 16 June 1976 (age 50)
- Place of birth: Esmeraldas, Ecuador
- Height: 1.72 m (5 ft 7 1/2 in)
- Position: Defensive midfielder

Senior career*
Years	Team	Apps	(Gls)
1995–2000	Aucas	117	(8)
1999	→ Wilstermann (loan)	0	(0)
2000–2001	Veracruz	7	(1)
2002–2006	Barcelona SC	174	(0)
2007	LDU Quito	15	(0)
2008–2009	Deportivo Quito	41	(2)
2009–2010	Deportivo Pereira	10	(0)
2010	Deportivo Quito	14	(0)
2011	Imbabura	23	(1)
2012	Grecia	15	(0)
Total		416	(12)

International career
1998–2007	Ecuador	78	(0)
- * Club domestic league appearances and goals

Edwin Rolando Tenorio Montaño (born 16 June 1976) is a retired Ecuadorian football midfielder.

== Club career ==
Before playing for his current club, Tenorio played for Sociedad Deportiva Aucas, Barcelona Sporting Club and LDU Quito where he was part of the squad that won the 2007 league championship. On 26 June 2009 he signed for Colombian club Deportivo Pereira.

== International career ==
Between 1998 and 2007 he won 78 caps for Ecuador and was called up to the squad to participate in the 2002 FIFA World Cup and the 2006 World Cup. In both tournaments, he formed part of the starting line up. He was named deputy captain for the national side in an August 2006 friendly against South American rivals, Peru. The game ended in a 1–1 draw. He made his debut for the national squad on 14 October 1998 with a loss (1–5) in a friendly against Brazil.

Tenorio is known for his combative spirit on and off the field. While he never scored for the senior team, he has on occasion displayed a powerful shot and set up a few goals for his teammates.

Tenorio was the first choice defensive midfielder for Ecuador in the 2002 FIFA World Cup in Japan-Korea and 2006 FIFA World Cup in Germany. In Germany, he formed an impressive defensive midfielder partnership with Segundo Castillo, helping Ecuador make it to the Round of 16. He also participated in Copa América 2001, 2004 and 2007.

Tenorio will now coach the Canal FC league in San Rafael, California.
