= Cristian Mora =

Ecuadorian footballer (born 1979)

Christian Mora
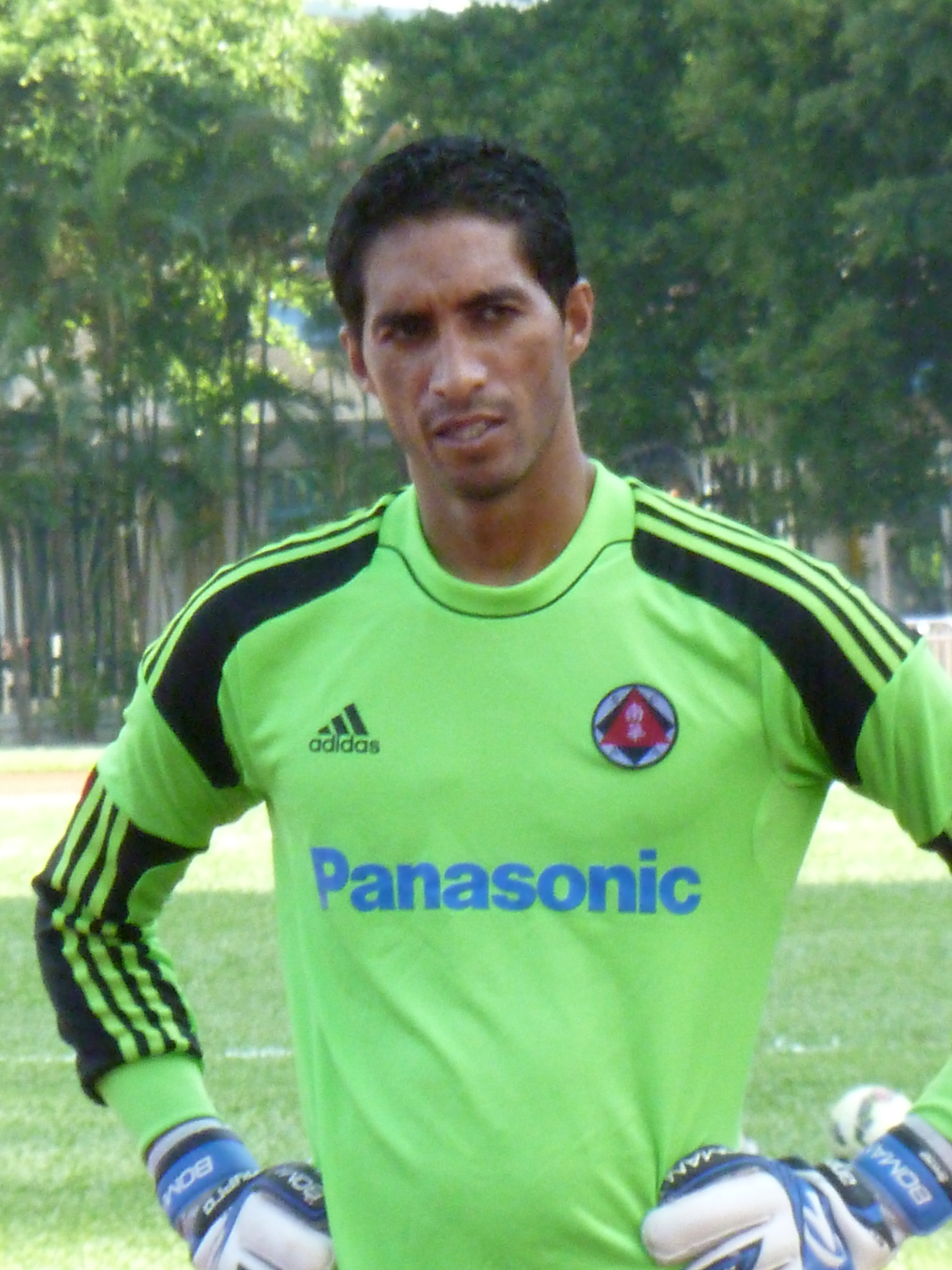
- Mora with South China in 2014

Personal information
- Full name: Cristhian Rafael Mora Medrano
- Date of birth: August 26, 1979 (age 47)
- Place of birth: Vinces, Los Ríos, Ecuador
- Height: 1.86 m (6 ft 1 in)
- Position: Goalkeeper

Youth career
- 1998–1999: Olmedo
- 2000: Deportivo Saquisilí
- 2001: ESPOLI

Senior career*
Years	Team	Apps	(Gls)
1998–1999	Olmedo	0	(0)
1999–2002	ESPOLI	1	(0)
2000	→ Deportivo Saquisilí (loan)	19	(0)
2002	→ Deportivo Saquisilí (loan)	25	(0)
2003–2005	Macará	62	(0)
2005–2008	LDU Quito	95	(0)
2008–2009	El Nacional	59	(0)
2010–2011	Universidad Católica	35	(0)
2011–2013	Macará	82	(0)
2014	Deportivo Cuenca	13	(0)
2014–2016	South China	26	(0)
Total		417	(0)

International career
2005–2009	Ecuador	20	(0)
- * Club domestic league appearances and goals

Cristian Rafael Mora Medrano (born August 26, 1979) is a retired Ecuadorian football goalkeeper.

== Club career ==
Mora once attended Colegio de las Hermanas Betlemitas and first played in Cóndor Futbol Club of San Miguel as goalkeeper at an early age. He also played for the San Miguel's city team in the Provincial Games and was picked as goalkeeper for the province team to play the national teen/amateur championship in Ecuador. Mora was then discovered and invited to train in Olmedo, while playing as goalkeeper in a friendly match against his college Escuela Politécnica de Riobamba.

On July 15, 2014, it was confirmed that Mora would go on loan to Hong Kong Premier League side South China.

== International career ==
Mora has made 20 appearances for the Ecuador national team, and made his first full-fledged senior appearance against Italy, a friendly match played in New Jersey. The game ended in a 1–1 draw and to Mora's credit, his penalty save from superstar Luca Toni forced many to take notice, including Luis Fernando Suarez, Ecuador's former Colombian coach.

He played first choice goalkeeper for the Ecuador national team during 2005's 2006 FIFA World Cup qualification. In the 2006 World Cup, Mora played all four matches before his team was eliminated in the Round of 16 by England. Mora allowed 4 goals but kept clean sheets against Poland and Costa Rica. However, due to poor friendly results and a bad Copa America 2007 he has failed to break with the national team.

== Titles ==
LDU Quito

- Serie A: 2005 Apertura, 2007
