= Segundo Castillo (footballer, born 1982) =

Ecuadorian footballer (born 1982)

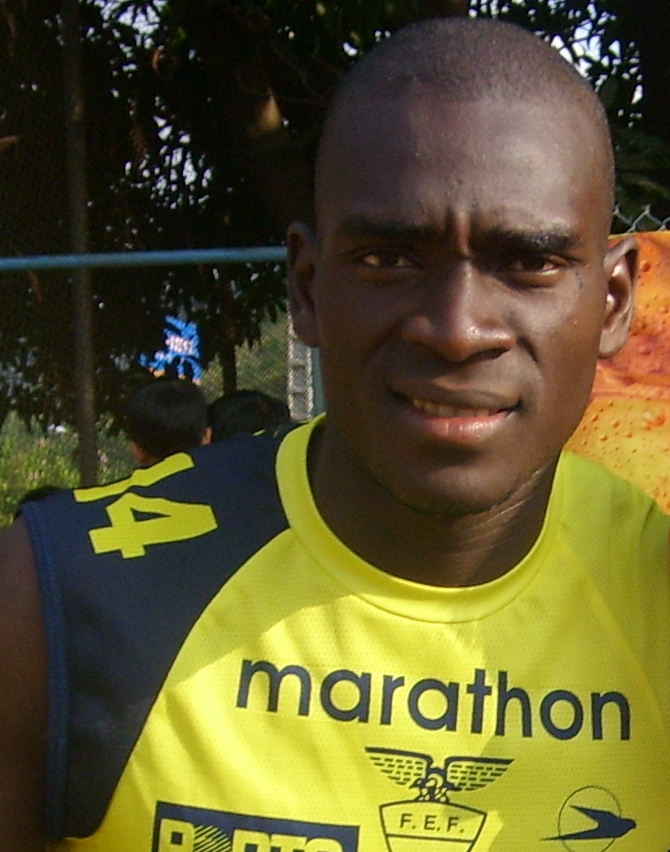
- Castillo with Ecuador in 2007

Personal information
- Full name: Segundo Alejandro Castillo Nazareno
- Date of birth: 15 May 1982 (age 44)
- Place of birth: San Lorenzo, Ecuador
- Height: 1.79 m (5 ft 10 in)
- Position: Defensive midfielder

Senior career*
Years	Team	Apps	(Gls)
2000–2003	Espoli	66	(11)
2003–2006	El Nacional	112	(11)
2006–2010	Red Star Belgrade	48	(15)
2008–2009	→ Everton (loan)	9	(0)
2009–2010	→ Wolverhampton Wanderers (loan)	8	(0)
2010–2011	Deportivo Quito	26	(6)
2011–2012	Pachuca	47	(4)
2012–2013	Puebla	17	(0)
2013–2014	Al-Hilal	24	(2)
2015	Dorados	33	(3)
2016–2018	Barcelona SC	48	(3)
2019–2020	Guayaquil City	20	(0)
Total		458	(54)

International career
2003–2016	Ecuador	87	(9)

Managerial career
- 2022: Barcelona SC (interim)
- 2023: Barcelona SC (interim)
- 2024–2025: Barcelona SC
- * Club domestic league appearances and goals

Segundo Alejandro Castillo Nazareno (born 15 May 1982) is an Ecuadorian football coach and former player who played as a midfielder. He was recently the manager of Barcelona SC.

Between 2003 and 2016, Castillo made 87 appearances for the Ecuador national team scoring 9 goals. Castillo has also played abroad for football clubs in Serbia, England, Mexico and Saudi Arabia.

== Club career ==
Born in San Lorenzo, Castillo started his career with Quito's Club Deportivo Espoli spending three years with the team, scoring a decent 11 goals in 66 appearances. He then moved across the capital to one of Ecuador's most successful sides Club Deportivo El Nacional, with whom he won successive league titles in 2005 and 2006. He again scored 11 goals in 112 matches for the club.

In August 2006 he moved abroad, signing a two-year deal with Serbian side Red Star Belgrade. He scored 8 goals during his first season at his new club and was a key player when the team won the double in 2007. In total he scored 18 goals in 72 games, an average of a goal every four games.

In August 2008 Castillo joined English Premier League club Everton on a year-long loan deal to become Everton's second signing of the summer transfer window. He made his league debut on 14 September 2008 against Stoke City. He scored his only goal for the Toffees on his home debut against Standard Liège on 18 September 2008 in a UEFA Cup tie with a powerful volley from 25 yards out.

Castillo was not offered a permanent contract by Everton at the conclusion of his loan spell; it was reported that Red Star were asking for around £5 million to make the deal permanent.

Castillo returned to the Premier League once again when he joined newly promoted Wolverhampton Wanderers on a season-long loan on 31 August 2009. He made his Wolves debut against Fulham on 20 September 2009, and had a run of eight appearances before dropping out of the club's first team plans. Castillo received many offers from clubs including LDU Quito and Barcelona. On 29 July 2010, it was confirmed that Castillo would return to his home country, Ecuador and play for Deportivo Quito.

In June 2013 he signed a two-year contract to Saudi giants Al-Hilal. On 16 September 2014, Al-Hilal came to terms that Castillo would no longer fit into their plans.

On 4 December 2014, it was announced by Dorados de Sinaloa that Castillo would be joining their roster for the next season of the Ascenso MX.

On 28 December 2015, it was confirmed that Castillo would again return to Ecuador to play for Barcelona Sporting Club.

== International career ==
Castillo broke into the Ecuador national team in 2005, making his international debut on 17 August as a substitute against Venezuela. He became a regular player after this and was included in their squad for the 2006 FIFA World Cup. He played every minute of their World Cup campaign, where Ecuador reached the second round for the first time in their history. He has gained a starting role since the 2006 campaign, mainly as a defensive midfielder and has captained the team in a few occasions.

He scored his first qualifying goal from a second half stoppage time header on 12 October 2012, the third goal in a 3–1 home win against Chile. Castillo was essential to Ecuador's qualifying campaign, netting equalizers that would become crucial points towards qualifying to the 2014 FIFA World Cup, against Venezuela and Argentina.

Castillo was left out of the 2014 World Cup during a friendly match with Mexico due to a collision with Luis Montes.

== Playing statistics ==
Scores and results list Ecuador's goal tally first, score column indicates score after each Castillo goal.

List of international goals scored by Segundo Castillo
No.	Date	Venue	Opponent	Score	Result	Competition
1	24 May 2006	Giants Stadium, East Rutherford, USA	Colombia	1–0	1–1	Friendly
2	26 March 2008	Estadio La Cocha, Latacunga, Ecuador	Haiti	1–1	3–1	Friendly
3	20 April 2011	Estadio Jose Maria Minella, Mar del Plata, Argentina	Argentina	2–2	2–2	Friendly
4	2 September 2011	Estadio Olímpico Atahualpa, Quito, Ecuador	Jamaica	5–1	5–2	Friendly
5	6 September 2011	Estadio Olímpico Atahualpa, Quito, Ecuador	Costa Rica	3–0	4–0	Friendly
6	12 October 2012	Estadio Olímpico Atahualpa, Quito, Ecuador	Chile	3–1	3–1	2014 FIFA World Cup qualification
7	16 October 2012	Estadio José Antonio Anzoátegui, Puerto La Cruz, Venezuela	Venezuela	1–1	1–1	2014 FIFA World Cup qualification
8	11 June 2013	Estadio Olímpico Atahualpa, Quito, Ecuador	Argentina	1–1	1–1	2014 FIFA World Cup qualification
9	5 March 2014	The Den, London, England	Australia	2–3	4–3	Friendly

== Managerial statistics ==
As of match played 18 June 2025

Managerial record by team and tenure
Team	From	To	Record							
Team	From	To	G	W	D	L	GF	GA	GD	Win %
Barcelona SC (interim)	5 June 2023	12 July 2023	5	2	1	2	9	10	−1	40.00
Barcelona SC (interim)	20 April 2024	28 April 2024	1	0	1	0	1	1	+0	0.00
Barcelona SC	10 October 2024	19 June 2025	32	15	7	10	50	37	+13	46.88
Total			38	17	9	12	60	48	+12	44.74

== Honours ==
Everton

- FA Cup runner-up: 2008–09
