= Luis Fernando Suárez =

Colombian footballer and manager (born 1959)

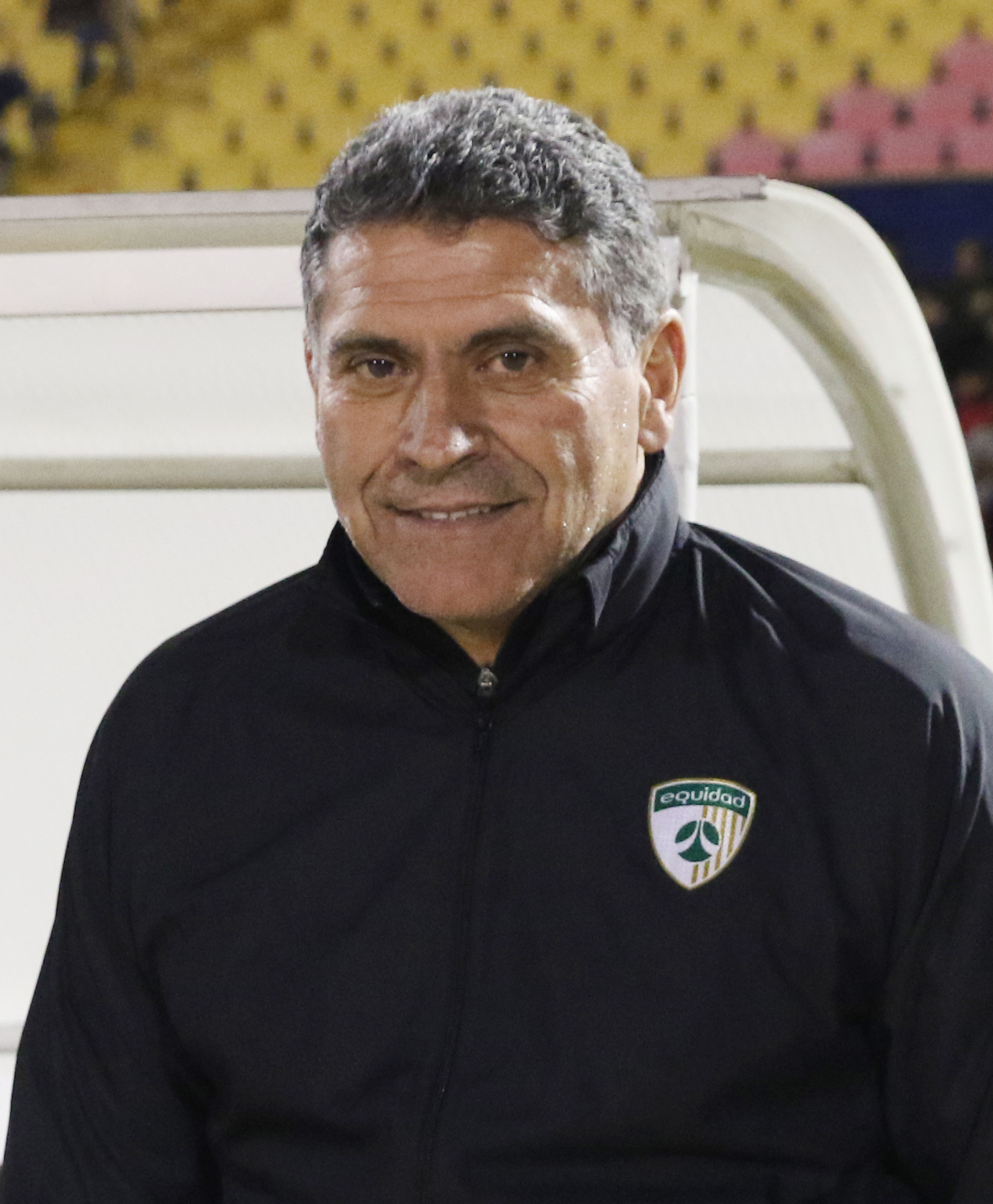
- Suárez managing La Equidad in 2018

Personal information
- Full name: Luis Fernando Suárez Guzmán
- Date of birth: 23 December 1959 (age 66)
- Place of birth: Medellín, Colombia
- Height: 1.76 m (5 ft 9 in)
- Position: Defender

Team information
- Current team: Deportes Tolima (manager)

Senior career*
Years	Team	Apps	(Gls)
1980–1993	Atlético Nacional		
1994–1995	Deportivo Pereira		

Managerial career
- 1999–2000: Atlético Nacional
- 2001: Deportivo Cali
- 2001: Deportes Tolima
- 2003–2004: Aucas
- 2004–2007: Ecuador
- 2008: Deportivo Pereira
- 2009: Atlético Nacional
- 2009–2010: Juan Aurich
- 2011–2014: Honduras
- 2015: Universitario
- 2015–2016: Dorados de Sinaloa
- 2017–2018: La Equidad
- 2018–2019: Junior
- 2021: Atlético Bucaramanga
- 2021–2023: Costa Rica
- 2024–2025: Deportivo Pereira
- 2026–: Deportes Tolima
- * Club domestic league appearances and goals

Luis Fernando Suárez Guzmán (born 23 December 1959) is a Colombian football manager and former footballer who played as a defender, currently manager of Colombian club Deportes Tolima. Suárez has managed in six Latin American countries: Colombia, Ecuador, Peru, Honduras, Mexico and Costa Rica.

== Managerial career ==
Suárez led the Ecuador national team to the round of 16 at the 2006 FIFA World Cup and won the 1999 Colombian championship with Atlético Nacional. In 2005, he led Ecuador to their second consecutive World Cup. He has enjoyed hero status in Ecuador and Colombia, leading Ecuador to their best showing in a FIFA World Cup in 2006. Reaching the second round by inflicting defeats on Poland and Costa Rica, they lost to England 1–0 after a David Beckham free kick sailed into the net.

Suárez was offered to keep coaching the Ecuador national team till the next World Cup in 2010. Following a poor 2007 Copa América, many people wanted him out. Suárez stated that he would not resign and would improve his results. Suárez got off to the worst possible start for the 2010 World Cup qualifiers, losing 1–0 at home to Venezuela and receiving a 5–0 hammering by Brazil. After another hammering defeat 5–1 to Paraguay, he resigned irrevocably his position as head coach, immediately after the end of the match. In October 2009 he signed with Juan Aurich, a Peruvian football team.

== Managerial statistics ==
As of match played 8 July 2023

Team	From	To	Record				
Team	From	To	G	W	D	L	Win %
Costa Rica	1 June 2021	20 July 2023	35	17	6	12	48.57

== Honors ==
As a player

Atlético Nacional

- Copa Libertadores: 1989

As a manager

Atlético Nacional

- Categoría Primera A: 1999
