= List of 2006 FIFA World Cup controversies =

The 2006 FIFA World Cup generated various controversies, including onfield disputes, critiques of official decisions, and team salary issues. Most centered on specific refereeing decisions, which led many of the world's media to claim that the referees were spoiling the World Cup. Numerous World Cup records were also set by controversial calls, including Graham Poll's three-card error and Valentin Ivanov's record number of cards in a single match.

== Refereeing ==
=== Australia vs. Japan (group stage) ===
In the first-round game of Australia versus Japan, the Egyptian referee Essam Abd El Fatah awarded a 26th-minute goal by Shunsuke Nakamura to the Japanese despite a protest from Australian goalkeeper Mark Schwarzer. Schwarzer appeared to have been impeded by the Japanese forward Atsushi Yanagisawa as he came forward to punch the ball clear. The Japanese striker Naohiro Takahara then collided with Schwarzer, leaving him unable to prevent the ball rolling into the goal.

Schwarzer told reporters later that El Fatah had apologised to him for his mistake and had told Australia's captain Mark Viduka that he was grateful "that God was on his side because the result went Australia's way in the end." Viduka told reporters "it was obvious that he made a mistake but everybody makes a mistake." Abdul-Fatah denied issuing an apology however, and said that "FIFA's refereeing committee... agreed unanimously that Japan's goal against Australia was correct", and would have awarded a penalty against Australia had the ball not gone in, as Takahara was pushed into Schwarzer by Craig Moore.

Australia's coach Guus Hiddink chose to "slightly, but not totally, apologise" for an off-field incident in which he pushed an official in a scramble to see a television replay of the goal. Hiddink said he believed it was an obvious foul, but also that Schwarzer "can defend himself even more" against such incidents.

The FIFA communications director Markus Siegler told the press later that a penalty should have been awarded to Japan for a foul on the Japanese midfielder Yūichi Komano by Tim Cahill. Siegler said "it was a clear mistake of the referee." Had a yellow card been shown to Cahill, who scored the deciding goal for Australia minutes later, he would have been sent off, with the score at 1–1. The Japanese coach Zico expressed frustration at FIFA's comments, saying that El Fatah had apologised for the mistake to the Australians but had not apologised for the error that FIFA admitted to. The Japan Football Association filed an official complaint against the Egyptian referee, who was sent home along with the English referee Graham Poll.

=== France vs. South Korea (group stage) ===
In the 31st minute of the game between France and South Korea, the French midfielder Patrick Vieira had a header at goal which appeared to be saved by Korean goalkeeper Lee Woon-Jae from behind the goal line. Mexican referee Benito Archundia and his linesmen did not believe the ball had passed the line, and no goal was awarded. The game resulted in a last minute 1–1 draw, shocking the French. French coach Raymond Domenech believed that France "scored a second time, but the referee did not recognize that." Television replays showed that the goal should have been awarded. French player Thierry Henry claimed the team was "really upset" when they saw the ball had passed the goal-line as "if he (the referee) had given us the valid goal, that would not have offered the Koreans the opportunity to come back into the match." However, it should also be noted that the corner kick leading to the header should have been a goal kick, as the ball had gone out of bounds off a French player. In addition, there appeared to be a whistle on the play for a foul on France, which would have negated the goal anyway.

The controversy revived questions over the possibility of goal-line technology use at the World Cup. A FIFA spokesperson, Markus Siegler, ruled out the short term likelihood saying that "its introduction depends on a system being developed that is 100 percent reliable". French goalkeeper Fabien Barthez voiced opposition to video replays during a game as "it's a shame to stop the play." Barthez said that he'd like to see more referees with "one in each half, and one behind each goal."

=== Croatia vs. Australia (group stage) ===
The deciding game for the Group F runners-up place, Croatia vs. Australia, saw a number of refereeing errors and controversies occur. Early in the first half, Australian striker Mark Viduka was wrestled to the ground within the penalty box by Croatian defender Josip Šimunić, but appeals for a foul or penalty kick were dismissed by English referee Graham Poll. Later in the first half, Croatian defender Stjepan Tomas handballed in the penalty box and a penalty kick was awarded to Australia, however Graham Poll failed to penalize Tomas for exactly the same deed in the middle of the second half when Australia was trying to equalize again. When Australia striker Harry Kewell equalized for Australia in the second half, he appeared to be offside for the goal, but the goal was still allowed to stand. Deep into stoppage time in the second half, there were two balls on the pitch, and Graham Poll then blew full-time at the instant John Aloisi scored what would've been a winning goal.

==== Three yellow cards ====
The English referee Graham Poll mistakenly issued three yellow cards to Croatian Josip Šimunić before sending him off. Šimunić was shown a yellow card by Poll in the 61st minute for a foul on Harry Kewell. In the 90th minute, Poll again showed Šimunić a yellow card for a foul, but did not follow it with a mandatory red card. In the 93rd minute, after Poll had blown the final whistle, Šimunić approached Poll angrily and gave him a push. Poll thus issued Šimunić with a third yellow card and also showed him the red card.

Questions were raised as to why Poll's assistants Phil Sharp and Glenn Turner, and the fourth official Kevin Stott, had also failed to realise the error. Poll later denied any blame should be placed upon the other officials saying, "I was the referee, it was my error and the buck stops with me". Poll reported that the officials had felt "disbelief" upon hearing of the error in the dressing room after the game. He and the other officials consequently reviewed the DVD of the game, and Poll realised that his "dream was over".

A similar incident in 1974 World Cup Group 1 also involved Australia, whose player Ray Richards was shown a second yellow card in the 83rd minute against Chile, but played on for four minutes until reserve official Clive Thomas informed a linesman that referee Jafar Namdar had forgotten to show a red card.

The Football Federation Australia chief executive John O'Neill later said that "Australia could have had grounds for a very strong appeal should Croatia have won the match". Poll also explained the reason for his mistake by saying that he "incorrectly noted down the name of the Australia number three Craig Moore when booking Šimunić for the second time and failed to realise his error" Šimunić is Australian-born, and hence speaks English with an Australian accent, probably causing the mistake.

The FIFA Referees Committee President Ángel María Villar defended Poll but had to concede that an error had occurred. In a statement he remarked, "Thursday evening's 2–2 draw between Croatia and Australia in Stuttgart saw referee Graham Poll make an error". As a result of his error, Poll and his assistants did not progress to the second stage of the tournament. Despite encouragement from the FIFA president Sepp Blatter and chief executives of the Football Association and Premier League, Poll retired from international tournaments. He explained his decision to retire was a result of the "pain and agony" and "sleepless nights" that resulted from his mistake and the fear of it happening again.

=== Portugal vs. Netherlands (round of 16) ===
Referee Valentin Ivanov set a new record for the number of red cards issued in a World Cup match with four, and tied the record for yellow cards with 16. FIFA president Sepp Blatter said of Ivanov, "I consider that today the referee was not at the same level as the participants, the players. There could have been a yellow card for the referee," although he later recanted, saying, "I regret what I said about his actions in the match between Portugal and the Netherlands." The managers also blamed each other for not playing fairly; Portugal's Luiz Felipe Scolari said, "FIFA talks about fair play. There was no fair play," while the Netherlands' Marco van Basten responded, "If you talk about fair play, you should watch yourself first... [Portugal was] a bit more experienced with all these tricks and all this time wasting."

Ivanov criticized both teams, reportedly saying, "They are known for time wasting and hitting from behind. I was unpleasantly surprised by seeing such things from the Dutch. More so, they were the instigators."

In the 7th minute, Portugal's Cristiano Ronaldo left the match with an injury after being tackled in the thigh by Khalid Boulahrouz. International Herald Tribune writer Rob Hughes wrote that he had not seen "a more cynical and brutal attempt to kick a player out of a match than what [Boulahrouz] did to [Ronaldo]," and that he should have been red carded on two occasions, but only received a yellow card. Boulahrouz was sent off in the 63rd minute after receiving his second yellow card for an elbow to Luís Figo's face.

In the 60th minute, Figo received a yellow card despite head-butting Dutchman Mark van Bommel, usually a red card offence, as stated by Law 12 of "The Laws of Football" – "A player shall be sent off if he/she is guilty of violent conduct." Figo did not receive further sanctions and was cleared to play in the subsequent quarter-final match against England as he had been shown the yellow card during the match. Van Bommel said of the decision, "Figo head butted me and that is not a yellow card. I blame the referee, it was a clear red card."

=== Italy vs. France (final) ===
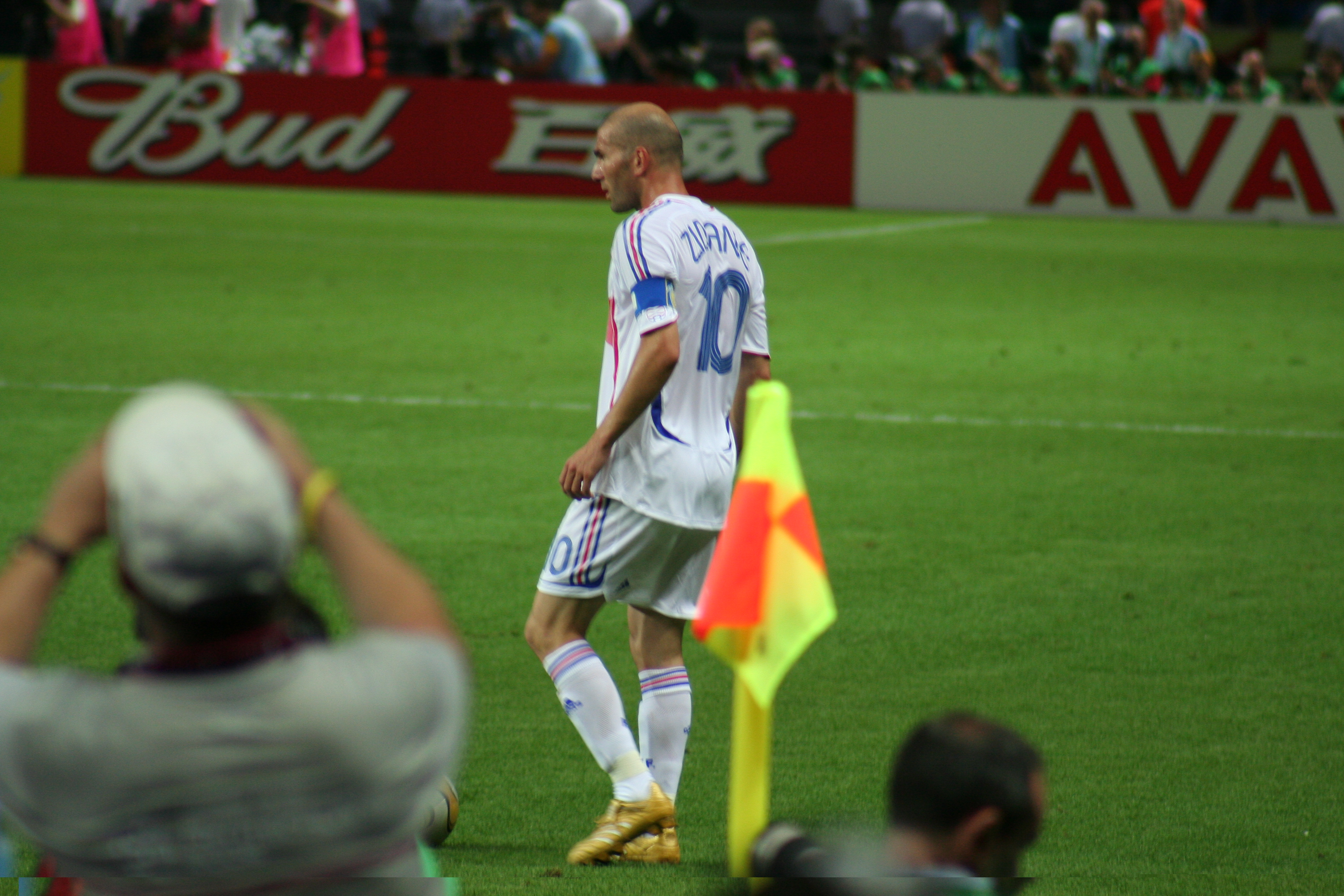
Zinedine Zidane converted a controversial penalty and was sent off for a headbutt in the 2006 FIFA World Cup Final

Zinedine Zidane opened the scoring in the 7th minute by converting a controversial penalty spot kick, which glanced off the underside of the crossbar and into the goal. The penalty was awarded after Florent Malouda went down inside the Italian penalty area under a challenge from Italian defender Marco Materazzi. The call was somewhat controversial—as it was put by an Associated Press report posted in the ESPN website "Malouda stumbled – many might say dived – in the penalty area and Elizondo immediately signaled a penalty kick".

Italy then equalized at the 19th minute with a header by Materazzi himself and went on to win the title on penalty shoot out. The controversy surrounding the penalty was however overshadowed by the discussion surrounding Zinedine Zidane's sending off by the end of extra-time for headbutting the Italian player in the chest.

=== General concerns with officiating less-prominent teams ===
Match referees have faced accusations of bias from the media and team representatives for allegedly favouring larger and better-established teams at the finals, at the expense of less established football nations.

After the Australian team was knocked out of the tournament as a result of a controversial penalty given against defender Lucas Neill in their second-round match against Italy, Australian assistant coach Graham Arnold was quoted as saying, "We are a small footballing nation that gets no favours. All we ask for is a fair go, and I don't think we received it over the four games." Likewise, after going down to Brazil in their second-round match, Ghana's head coach Ratomir Dujković stated that "the referee might as well have been wearing a yellow shirt under his own".

One basis for these claims has been the irregular balance of fouls sanctioned by referees between traditional powers and emerging teams. As of 27 June, the top eight seeded teams have a combined net surplus of 93 more fouls sustained than committed with an average of 3.1 per match, according to statistics published on FIFA's website.

On average, as of 27 June, the team with the highest fouls count of the finals have been debutants; Ghana, with a 1.95 ratio between fouls committed and fouls sustained, Tunisia with a ratio of 1.76 fouls committed/sustained, and Australia with a 1.75 ratio.

By contrast, the teams with fewer fouls committed have been traditional powerhouses Italy, Brazil and Spain – with respective averages of 0.66, 0.67 and 0.75 in fouls committed/sustained ratios.

On the other hand, the teams that committed the least fouls (less than 50 in three games) were Trinidad and Tobago, Costa Rica, Côte d'Ivoire, South Korea, Paraguay, Poland and Japan (the latter with just 38 fouls). Also, of the 5 teams most judged wrongly offside, four were in "Pot A", which therefore seeds them in the top 8 (Italy, Argentina, France and Brazil) and the other emerging European side Ukraine. Of the teams that were judged to be in an offside position incorrectly on no occasion in the first three games, only one (Mexico) was seeded into "Pot A".

While these statistics could be used to support claims of bias, they could also indicate that some teams are rougher and that the stronger teams are more disciplined, and their success is due to their not committing excessive fouls. Additionally it should be considered that a team in possession is more likely to sustain a foul than a defending team, and therefore the successful teams are likely to sustain more fouls.

FIFA president Sepp Blatter told before the tournament that referees should protect big star players: "What has been clearly said to referees is 'please protect the physical integrity of the players', and that means protecting the big stars".

=== Defence of referees ===
On summing up the progress of the tournament at the conclusion of the group stage, Sepp Blatter spoke in defence of FIFA's officiating in the tournament, stating "... referees are only human, and they make mistakes. We have to reduce the number of mistakes, but we're all still searching in vain for perfection." Despite Blatter's statement, both Ivanov and Poll, referees at the center of the two largest controversies, were not included on the twelve-team list of officials selected by FIFA to referee the final eight matches of the competition.

== Player disputes ==
=== Togo ===
Following months of confusion over who would be managing the African debutants Togo, Otto Pfister was only confirmed in the job the day before their opening match against South Korea. Pfister had previously resigned as coach of the team. The players threatened to boycott the final group match against France due to pay disputes.

== Discipline ==
Certain matches attracted attention due to the high number of cards.

The Italy – USA match had three red cards with De Rossi of Italy in particular given marching orders for elbowing an opponent. This match was second only to the encounter between the Netherlands and Portugal (which had four, as well as 16 yellows). A Croatian player was also sent off after having (mistakenly) been given three yellow cards by referee Graham Poll.

== Fan issues ==
Some Dutch fans were forced to take off their trousers branded with the logo of Bavaria beer, as Budweiser was the official beer of the tournament. Rather than leave the stadium, they proceeded to watch the match in their underclothes.

== Crime ==
=== Hooliganism ===
While the German Police expressed satisfaction in their ability to contain and deal with hooliganism, speculation was rife that a number of potential flashpoints existed which could cause widespread public disorder. With a number of routes into the country, amongst them the open land borders which are a consequence of the Schengen agreement, apprehension of known troublemakers and organisers of disturbances looked to be a very real problem. However, during the World Cup, Germany suspended its rules granting passport-free travel to EU citizens. As an illustration of this, on 8 June, German police apprehended 9 English hooligans attempting to enter the country via the Czech border. Britain has a particularly stringent policy of restricting foreign travel of known football hooligans during periods where the England team are involved. 3,500 banning orders were served, and by 8 June all but 150 had surrendered their passports. On 9 June Channel 4 News in the UK reported that although there had been no violence, England fans in Frankfurt had been kicking footballs at the windows of the city's 600-year-old Römer city hall building, although local police decided not to take action over this minor incident and the staff at the Mayor's office apparently took the attempted vandalism in good humour. On the day of England's first match against Paraguay two England fans were arrested for having swastikas and SS insignia painted on their bodies. The two were flown back to England to appear in court; one was found guilty and banned from attending football matches until 2008, while the other was not banned as the symbol (the double-sig rune of the SS) was painted on his back, and he may not have been able to see it or known what it was. The court heard that the fan found guilty also had a letter J on his arm, believed to be a slight to Jews, but claimed not to know its meaning. There was also concern over hooligans among the 300,000 Polish fans who travelled to Germany for the tournament. This supposition was borne out as clashes between rival groups of supporters culminated in the arrest of 429 prior to and in the wake of the game between Germany and Poland in Dortmund.

On 14 June, ITV news in the UK reported that up to that date 7 England fans had been arrested, one for a "serious offence".

=== Racism ===
It was claimed that "foreign-looking" football fans should not visit some areas of Eastern Germany, after one newspaper reported that German white power skinheads were planning to commit violence against foreigners. Germany contains a small but vocal neo-Nazi minority who have engaged in violent attacks against immigrants and tourists since the fall of the Berlin Wall and subsequent German reunification. According to German police, neo-Nazi hate crime was on the rise and had increased significantly over the preceding few months. Two human rights organizations, the Africa Council and the International League for Human Rights, advised Black and Asian fans to avoid certain areas of Eastern Germany during the World Cup.

The far-right National Democratic Party of Germany, an organisation which the German government unsuccessfully tried to ban in 2001, had planned to march through Gelsenkirchen on 10 June, a day after Ecuador played against Poland in the city's new purpose-built stadium. This march had first been banned by the German police, but later permitted by the Gelsenkirchen Administrative Court. Other far-right marches were planned for Frankfurt and Herne during the competition, although these were subsequently banned.

FIFA announced that at the World Cup, teams could have points deducted for racist remarks by players and officials. A "Football Against Racism" logo covered each field's center circle until kickoff at all World Cup matches. Prior to every quarter-final match, the captains read a "declaration against racism" over the PA system. The European Union (EU) launched a campaign against racism before the World Cup. Friso Roscam Abbing, spokesman for the EU Justice and Home Affairs Commissioner indicated that the campaign also targeted prostitution rings and human trafficking.

=== Trafficking of women ===
Some international human rights groups (like the Parliamentary Assembly of the Council of Europe (PACE), the Nordic Council and Amnesty International) expressed concern that there would be an increase in the trafficking of women up to and during the World Cup. PACE and Amnesty claimed that 30,000 women and girls might become the subject of slavery for the purposes of forced prostitution during the World Cup. They called upon the German authorities to monitor sex venues during the World Cup and provide support for the victims of trafficking.

According to German police, there was no noticeable increase in forced prostitution during the World Cup. While there was a significant influx of (legal and illegal) prostitutes to Germany before the World Cup, most of those were reported to have left within the first two weeks. Police officials from several cities quoted prostitutes saying that business actually decreased.

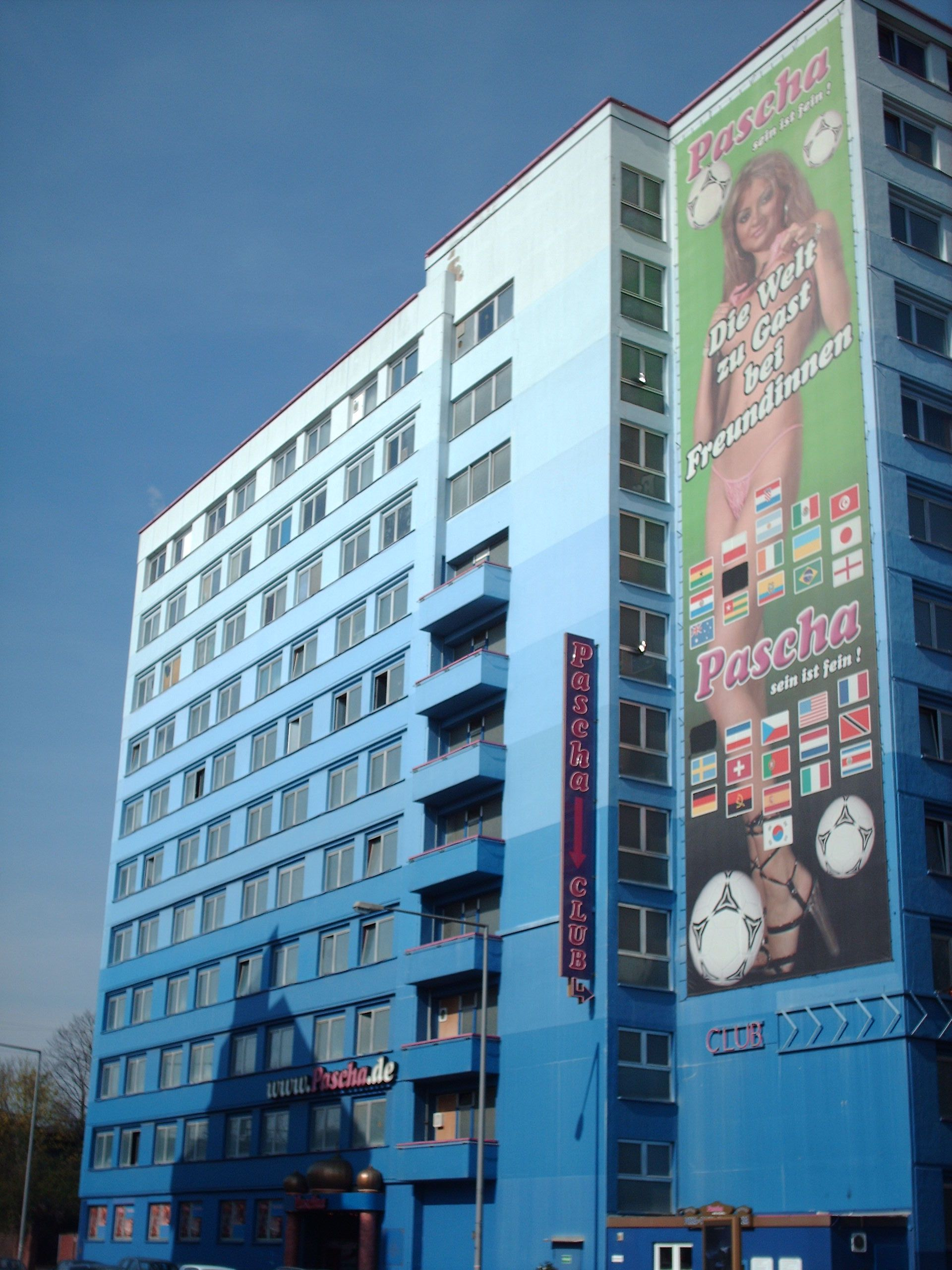
The Pascha during the 2006 FIFA World Cup, with the Saudi Arabian flag and Iranian flag blacked out on the poster after protests and threats

Before the tournament, a promotional poster for the Cologne brothel Pascha, featuring flags of the qualified national teams alongside a semi-nude image and the slogan "Die Welt zu Gast bei Freundinnen" ("The world as guest with girlfriends"), sparked protests from members of the Muslim community, who objected to the depiction of the flags of Saudi Arabia and Iran; in response, the owners blacked out the two flags.

=== Computer cracking ===
FIFA's IT provider Avaya indicated that it expected, and was prepared for, the denial-of-service attacks which were unsuccessfully launched at the IT network for the 2002 World Cup. No successful attacks were launched on the German World Cup system.
