= 2006 FIFA World Cup =

Association football tournament in Germany

FIFA Fußball-Weltmeisterschaft Deutschland 2006 (German)

Tournament details
- Host country: Germany
- Dates: 9 June – 9 July
- Teams: 32 (from 6 confederations)
- Venues: 12 (in 12 host cities)

Final positions
- Champions: Italy (4th title)
- Runners-up: France
- Third place: Germany
- Fourth place: Portugal

Tournament statistics
- Matches played: 64
- Goals scored: 147 (2.3 per match)
- Attendance: 3,359,439 (52,491 per match)
- Top scorer(s): (Germany) Miroslav Klose (5 goals)
- Best player: (France) Zinedine Zidane
- Best young player: (Germany) Lukas Podolski
- Best goalkeeper: (Italy) Gianluigi Buffon
- Fair play award: Brazil; Spain

The 2006 FIFA World Cup was the 18th FIFA World Cup, the quadrennial international football world championship tournament. It was held from 9 June to 9 July 2006 in Germany, which had won the right to host the event in July 2000. Teams representing 198 national football associations from all six populated continents participated in the qualification process which began in September 2003. Thirty-one teams qualified from this process along with hosts Germany for the finals tournament. It was the second time that Germany staged the competition and the first as a unified country along with the former East Germany with Leipzig as a host city (the other was in 1974 in West Germany), and the 10th time that the tournament was held in Europe.

Italy won the tournament, claiming their fourth World Cup title, defeating France 5–3 in a penalty shoot-out in the final after extra time had finished in a 1–1 draw. Germany defeated Portugal 3–1 to finish in third place. Angola, Ukraine, Ghana, Ivory Coast, Trinidad and Tobago and Togo made their first appearances in the competition. It was also the only appearance of Serbia and Montenegro under that name; they had previously appeared in 1998 as Yugoslavia. In late May 2006, immediately prior to the tournament, Montenegro voted in a referendum to become an independent nation and dissolve the loose confederacy then existing between it and Serbia; Serbia recognised the results of the referendum in early June. Due to time constraints, FIFA had Serbia and Montenegro play in the World Cup tournament as one team, marking the first instance of multiple sovereign nations competing as one team in a major football tournament since UEFA Euro 1992.

Brazil were the defending world champions, but were eliminated by France in the quarter-finals. The 2006 World Cup stands as one of the most watched events in television history, garnering an estimated 26.29 billion times viewed compiled over the course of the tournament. The final attracted an estimated audience of 715.1 million people.

== Host selection ==
The vote to choose the hosts of the 2006 tournament was held in July 2000 in Zürich, Switzerland. It involved four bidding nations after Brazil had withdrawn three days earlier: Germany, South Africa, England and Morocco. Three rounds of voting were required, each round eliminating the nation with the fewest votes. The first two rounds were held on 6 July 2000, and the final round was held on 7 July 2000, which Germany won over South Africa.

Voting results
Country	Round 1	Round 2	Round 3
Germany	10	11	12
South Africa	6	11	11
England	5	2	–
Morocco	3	–	–

=== Bribery and corruption allegations ===
Accusations of bribery and corruption had marred the success of Germany's bid from the very beginning. On the very day of the vote, a hoax bribery affair was made public, leading to calls for a re-vote. On the night before the vote, German satirical magazine Titanic sent letters to FIFA representatives, offering joke gifts like cuckoo clocks and Black Forest ham in exchange for their vote for Germany. Oceania delegate Charlie Dempsey, who had initially backed England, had then been instructed to support South Africa following England's elimination. He abstained, citing "intolerable pressure" on the eve of the vote. Had Dempsey voted as originally instructed, the vote would have resulted with a 12–12 tie, and FIFA president Sepp Blatter, who favoured the South African bid, would have had to cast the deciding vote.

More irregularities surfaced soon after, including, in the months leading up to the decision, the sudden interest of German politicians and major businesses in the four Asian countries whose delegates were decisive for the vote. Just a week before the vote, the German government under Chancellor Gerhard Schröder lifted their arms embargo on Saudi Arabia and agreed to send grenade launchers to the country. DaimlerChrysler invested several hundred million euros in Hyundai, where one of the sons of the company's founder was a member of FIFA's executive committee. Both Volkswagen and Bayer announced investments in Thailand and South Korea, whose respective delegates Worawi Makudi and Chung Mong-joon were possible voters for Germany. Makudi additionally received a payment by a company of German media mogul Leo Kirch, who also paid millions for usually worthless TV rights for friendly matches of the Germany team and FC Bayern Munich.

On 16 October 2015, German news magazine Der Spiegel alleged that a slush fund with money from then-Adidas CEO Robert Louis-Dreyfus was used to influence the vote of four Asian members of the FIFA executive committee. The sum of €6.7 million was later demanded back by Dreyfus. In order to retrieve the money, the Organising Committee paid an equivalent sum to FIFA, allegedly as a German share for the cost of a closing ceremony, which never materialized. Wolfgang Niersbach, president of the German Football Association (DFB), denied the allegations on 17 October 2015, saying that "the World Cup was not bought" and that he could "absolutely and categorically rule out the existence of a slush fund". The DFB announced they would consider seeking legal action against Der Spiegel. During a press conference on 22 October 2015, Niersbach repeated his stance, emphasising that the €6.7 million was used in 2002 to secure a subsidy by FIFA. According to Niersbach, the payment had been agreed upon during a meeting between Franz Beckenbauer and FIFA president Blatter, with the money being provided by Dreyfus. On the same day, FIFA contradicted Niersbach's statement, saying: "By our current state of knowledge, no such payment of 10 million francs was registered by FIFA in 2002." The following day, former DFB president Theo Zwanziger publicly accused Niersbach of lying, saying: "It is evident that there was a slush fund for the German World Cup application". According to Zwanziger, the €6.7 million went to Mohamed Bin Hammam, who at the time was supporting Blatter's campaign for president against Issa Hayatou. On 22 March 2016, it was announced that the FIFA Ethics Committee was opening proceedings into the bid.

== Qualification ==
198 teams attempted to qualify for the 2006 World Cup. Germany, the host nation, was granted automatic qualification, with the remaining 31 finals places divided among the continental confederations. For the first time since 1934, the defending champions did not automatically qualify for the tournament meaning Brazil had to play in the qualifiers. Thirteen places were contested by UEFA teams (Europe), five by CAF teams (Africa), four by CONMEBOL teams (South America), four by AFC teams (Asia), and three by CONCACAF teams (North and Central America and Caribbean). The remaining two places were decided by playoffs between AFC and CONCACAF and between CONMEBOL and OFC (Oceania).

Eight nations qualified for the finals for the first time: Angola, Czech Republic, Ghana, Ivory Coast, Togo, Trinidad and Tobago, Ukraine, and Serbia and Montenegro. Czech Republic and Ukraine were making their first appearance as independent nations, but had previously been represented as part of Czechoslovakia and the Soviet Union respectively, with Ukraine being the second independent nation to do so after Russia in 1994; Serbia and Montenegro had competed as Federal Republic of Yugoslavia in 1998, as well as making up part of Yugoslav teams from 1930 to 1990.

Australia qualified for the first time since 1974. The highest-ranked team that failed to qualify was Denmark (ranked 11th), while the lowest-ranked team that did qualify was Togo (ranked 61st). For the first time since the 1982 World Cup, all six confederations were represented at the finals tournament. The State Union of Serbia and Montenegro dissolved prior to the start of the World Cup, on 3 June 2006, with Serbia and Montenegro becoming independent countries; their team competed at the World Cup unaffected. Their involvement in the competition became similar to the Commonwealth of Independent States that appeared at UEFA Euro 1992, a team formed to take the Soviet Union's place following dissolution, that multiple sovereign states had been represented in the finals of a major footballing tournament by a single team and the only occurrence in the World Cup finals to date.

=== List of qualified teams ===
The following 32 teams, shown with final pre-tournament rankings, qualified for the finals tournament:

AFC (4)

- Iran (23)
- Japan (18)
- Saudi Arabia (34)
- South Korea (29)

CAF (5)

- Angola (57) (debut)
- Ghana (48) (debut)
- Ivory Coast (32) (debut)
- Togo (61) (debut)
- Tunisia (21)

CONCACAF (4)

- Costa Rica (26)
- Mexico (4)
- Trinidad and Tobago (47) (debut)
- United States (5)

CONMEBOL (4)

- Argentina (9)
- Brazil (1)
- Ecuador (39)
- Paraguay (33)

OFC (1)

- Australia (42)

UEFA (14)

- Croatia (23)
- Czech Republic (2)
- England (10)
- France (8)
- Germany (19) (hosts)
- Italy (13)
- Netherlands (3)
- Poland (29)
- Portugal (7)
- Serbia and Montenegro (44)
- Spain (5)
- Sweden (16)
- Switzerland (35)
- Ukraine (45) (debut)

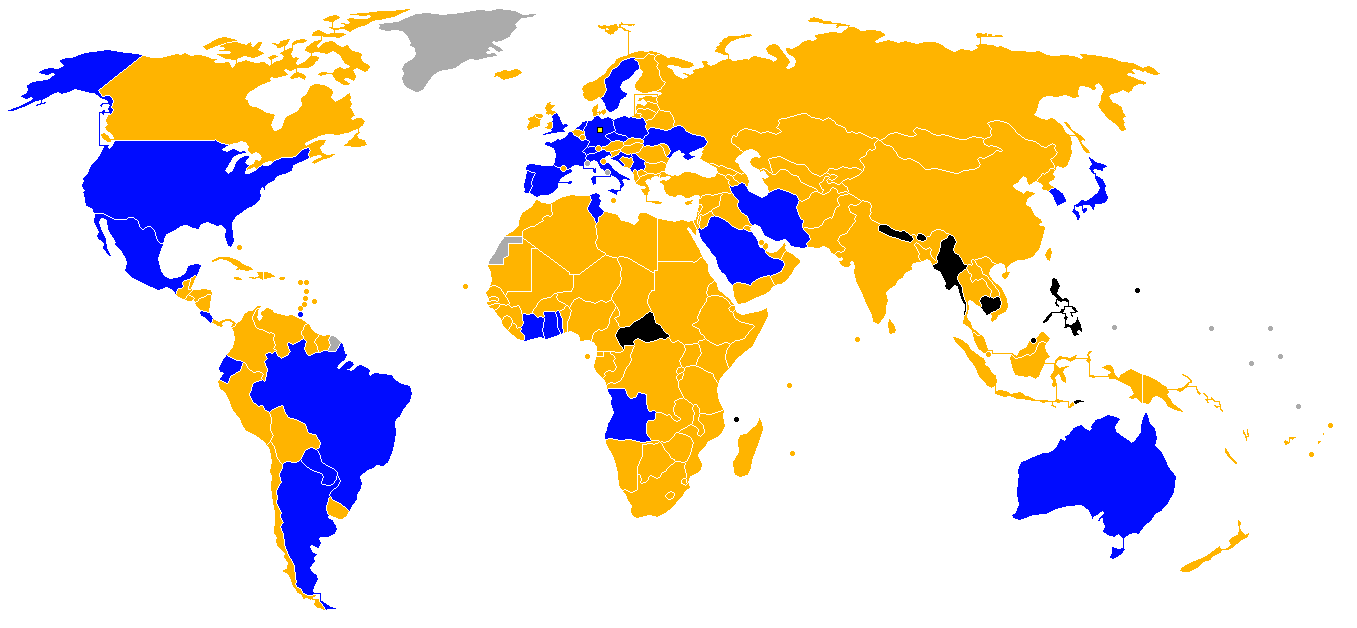
Countries qualified for World Cup Country did not qualify Countries that did not enter World Cup Country not a FIFA member

Teams listed by FIFA ranking as of May 2006
	Country	Confederation	Rank
1	Brazil	CONMEBOL	1
2	Czech Republic	UEFA	2
3	Netherlands	UEFA	3
4	Mexico	CONCACAF	4
5	United States	CONCACAF	5
5	Spain	UEFA	5
7	Portugal	UEFA	7
8	France	UEFA	8
9	Argentina	CONMEBOL	9
10	England	UEFA	10
11	Italy	UEFA	13
12	Sweden	UEFA	16
13	Japan	AFC	18
14	Germany	UEFA	19
15	Tunisia	CAF	21
16	Iran	AFC	23
16	Croatia	UEFA	23
18	Costa Rica	CONCACAF	25
19	South Korea	AFC	29
19	Poland	UEFA	29
21	Ivory Coast	CAF	32
22	Paraguay	CONMEBOL	33
23	Saudi Arabia	AFC	34
24	Switzerland	UEFA	35
25	Ecuador	CONMEBOL	39
26	Australia	OFC	42
27	Serbia and Montenegro	UEFA	44
28	Ukraine	UEFA	45
29	Trinidad and Tobago	CONCACAF	47
30	Ghana	CAF	48
31	Angola	CAF	57
32	Togo	CAF	61

== Venues ==
In 2006, Germany had a plethora of football stadia that satisfied FIFA's minimum capacity of 40,000 seats for World Cup matches. The outdated and still-standing Olympiastadion in Munich (69,250), the venue for the 1974 final match was not used for the tournament, even though FIFA's regulations allow one city to use two stadia. Düsseldorf's LTU Arena (51,500), Bremen's Weserstadion (43,000) and Mönchengladbach's Borussia-Park (46,249) were also not used. Düsseldorf was the only 1974 host city not to be selected to host games for the 2006 edition, while Munich and Gelsenkirchen were the only ones with different venues from 32 years prior. One city located in the former East Germany, Leipzig, was selected to host games.

Twelve stadia were selected to host the World Cup matches. During the tournament, many of them were known by different names, as FIFA prohibits sponsorship of stadia unless the stadium sponsors are also official FIFA sponsors. For example, the Allianz Arena in Munich was known during the competition as FIFA World Cup Stadium, Munich (German: FIFA WM-Stadion München), and even the letters of the company Allianz were removed or covered. Some of the stadia also had a lower capacity for the World Cup, as FIFA regulations ban standing room; nonetheless, this was accommodated as several stadia had a UEFA five-star ranking. The stadia in Berlin, Munich, Dortmund and Stuttgart hosted six matches each, whilst the other eight stadia hosted five matches each.

- A cross denotes an indoor stadium.

Berlin	Munich	Dortmund	Stuttgart
Olympiastadion	Allianz Arena (FIFA World Cup Stadium, Munich)	Westfalenstadion (FIFA World Cup Stadium, Dortmund)	MHPArena
52°30′53″N 13°14′22″E	48°13′7.59″N 11°37′29.11″E	51°29′33.25″N 7°27′6.63″E	48°47′32.17″N 9°13′55.31″E
Capacity: 72,000	Capacity: 66,000	Capacity: 65,000	Capacity: 52,000
Gelsenkirchen	2006 FIFA World Cup (Germany)		Hamburg
Arena AufSchalke† (FIFA World Cup Stadium, Gelsenkirchen)	2006 FIFA World Cup (Germany)		AOL Arena (FIFA World Cup Stadium, Hamburg)
51°33′16.21″N 7°4′3.32″E	2006 FIFA World Cup (Germany)		53°35′13.77″N 9°53′55.02″E
Capacity: 52,000	2006 FIFA World Cup (Germany)		Capacity: 50,000
Frankfurt	2006 FIFA World Cup (Germany)		Kaiserslautern
Commerzbank-Arena† (FIFA World Cup Stadium, Frankfurt)	2006 FIFA World Cup (Germany)		Fritz-Walter-Stadion
50°4′7″N 8°38′44″E	2006 FIFA World Cup (Germany)		49°26′5″N 7°46′35″E
Capacity: 48,000	2006 FIFA World Cup (Germany)		Capacity: 46,000
Cologne	Hanover	Leipzig	Nuremberg
RheinEnergieStadion (FIFA World Cup Stadium, Cologne)	Niedersachsenstadion (FIFA World Cup Stadium, Hanover)	Red Bull Arena	easyCredit-Stadion (Frankenstadion)
50°56′1″N 6°52′30″E	52°21′36″N 9°43′52″E	51°20′45″N 12°20′54″E	49°25′34″N 11°7′33″E
Capacity: 45,000	Capacity: 43,000	Capacity: 43,000	Capacity: 41,000

=== Team base camps ===
Base camps were used by the 32 national squads to stay and train before and during the World Cup tournament. FIFA announced the base camps for each participating team.

National squads' base camps

Team	City
Angola	Celle
Argentina	Herzogenaurach
Australia	Zweiflingen
Brazil	Bergisch Gladbach
Costa Rica	Walldorf
Croatia	Bad Brückenau
Czech Republic	Westerburg
Ecuador	Bad Kissingen
England	Baden-Baden
France	Aerzen
Germany	Berlin
Ghana	Würzburg
Iran	Friedrichshafen
Italy	Duisburg
Ivory Coast	Niederkassel
Japan	Bonn

Team	City
Mexico	Göttingen
Netherlands	Hinterzarten
Paraguay	Oberhaching
Poland	Barsinghausen
Portugal	Marienfeld
Saudi Arabia	Bad Nauheim
Serbia and Montenegro	Billerbeck
Spain	Kamen
South Korea	Bergisch Gladbach
Sweden	Bremen
Switzerland	Bad Bertrich
Togo	Wangen im Allgäu
Trinidad and Tobago	Rotenburg an der Wümme
Tunisia	Schweinfurt
Ukraine	Potsdam
United States	Hamburg

== Match officials ==
Confederation	Referee	Assistants
AFC	Toru Kamikawa (Japan)	Yoshikazu Hiroshima (Japan); Kim Dae-Young (South Korea)
AFC	Shamsul Maidin (Singapore)	Prachya Permpanich (Thailand); Eisa Ghoulom (United Arab Emirates)
CAF	Coffi Codjia (Benin)	Aboudou Aderodjou (Benin); Célestin Ntagungira (Rwanda)
CAF	Essam Abdel-Fatah (Egypt)	Dramane Dante (Mali); Mamadou N'Doye (Senegal)
CONCACAF	Benito Archundia (Mexico)	José Ramírez (Mexico); Héctor Vergara (Canada)
CONCACAF	Marco Rodríguez (Mexico)	José Luis Camargo (Mexico); Leonel Leal (Costa Rica)
CONMEBOL	Horacio Elizondo (Argentina)	Darío García (Argentina); Rodolfo Otero (Argentina)
CONMEBOL	Carlos Simon (Brazil)	Aristeu Tavares (Brazil); Ednílson Corona (Brazil)
CONMEBOL	Óscar Ruiz (Colombia)	José Navia (Colombia); Fernando Tamayo (Ecuador)
CONMEBOL	Carlos Amarilla (Paraguay)	Amelio Andino (Paraguay); Manuel Bernal (Paraguay)
CONMEBOL	Jorge Larrionda (Uruguay)	Wálter Rial (Uruguay); Pablo Fandiño (Uruguay)
OFC	Mark Shield (Australia)	Nathan Gibson (Australia); Ben Wilson (Australia)
UEFA	Frank De Bleeckere (Belgium)	Peter Hermans (Belgium); Walter Vromans (Belgium)
UEFA	Graham Poll (England)	Philip Sharp (England); Glenn Turner (England)
UEFA	Éric Poulat (France)	Lionel Dagorne (France); Vincent Texier (France)
UEFA	Markus Merk (Germany)	Jan-Hendrik Salver (Germany); Christian Schräer (Germany)
UEFA	Roberto Rosetti (Italy)	Alessandro Stagnelli (Italy); Cristiano Copelli (Italy)
UEFA	Valentin Ivanov (Russia)	Nikolay Golubev (Russia); Evgueni Volnin (Russia)
UEFA	Ľuboš Micheľ (Slovakia)	Roman Slyško (Slovakia); Martin Balko (Slovakia)
UEFA	Luis Medina Cantalejo (Spain)	Victoriano Giráldez Carrasco (Spain); Pedro Medina Hernández (Spain)
UEFA	Massimo Busacca (Switzerland)	Francesco Buragina (Switzerland); Matthias Arnet (Switzerland)

== Squads ==
Squads for the 2006 World Cup consisted of 23 players, as in the previous tournament in 2002. Each participating national association had to confirm its 23-player squad by 15 May 2006.

== Groups ==
=== Seeds ===
The eight seeded teams for the tournament were announced on 6 December 2005 and placed into Pot A for the draw. Pot B contained the unseeded qualifiers from South America, Africa and Oceania; Pot C contained eight of the nine remaining European teams, excluding Serbia and Montenegro. Pot D contained unseeded teams from the CONCACAF region and Asia. To ensure that no group contained three European teams, Serbia and Montenegro was placed in a special pot, as they were the lowest ranked qualified team from Europe on the latest FIFA World Ranking; while it was deemed of less importance they had been seeded higher than Switzerland and Ukraine by the 2006 World Cup seeding tool. Serbia and Montenegro was drawn first, then their group was drawn from the three seeded non-European nations, Argentina, Brazil, and Mexico. FIFA predetermined that hosts Germany would be placed in Group A, thus being assured of the venues of their group matches in advance of the draw. They also announced in advance that defending champions Brazil would be allocated to Group F.

Pot A
Team	Points	Rank
Germany (Note: As hosts, Germany were automatically assigned to the first position in Group A.)	49.3	4
Brazil	63.7	1
England	50.7	2
Spain	50.0	3
Mexico	47.3	5
France	46.0	6
Italy	44.3	7
Argentina	44.0	8

Pot B
Team	Points	Rank
Paraguay	31.3	15
Tunisia	19.0	22
Ecuador	16.0	23
Ivory Coast	7.0	27
Australia	4.3	28
Ghana	3.3	30
Angola	2.0	31
Togo	1.3	32

Pot C
Team	Points	Rank
Netherlands	38.3	10
Sweden	33.7	13
Croatia	33.0	14
Czech Republic	29.0	16
Portugal	28.7	17
Poland	20.3	20
Switzerland	8.7	25
Ukraine	7.0	26

Pot D
Team	Points	Rank
United States	42.7	9
South Korea	37.3	11
Japan	36.0	12
Costa Rica	22.7	18
Saudi Arabia	20.7	19
Iran	19.3	21
Trinidad and Tobago	4.3	29

Special Pot
Team	Points	Rank
Serbia and Montenegro	15.7	24

The group stage draw was held in Leipzig on 9 December 2005, and the group assignments and order of matches were determined. After the draw was completed, commentators remarked that Group C appeared to be the group of death, while others suggested Group E. Argentina and the Netherlands both qualified with a game to spare with wins over Ivory Coast and Serbia and Montenegro respectively.

=== Group system ===
The first round, or group stage, saw the 32 teams divided into eight groups of four teams. Each group was a round-robin of three games, where each team played one match against each of the other teams in the same group. Teams were awarded three points for a win, one point for a draw and none for a defeat. The teams coming first and second in each group qualified for the Round of 16.

==== Ranking criteria ====
If teams were level on points, they were ranked on the following criteria in order:

1. Greatest total goal difference in the three group matches
2. Greatest number of goals scored in the three group matches
3. If teams remained level after those criteria, a mini-group would be formed from those teams, who would be ranked on:
  1. Most points earned in matches against other teams in the tie
  2. Greatest goal difference in matches against other teams in the tie
  3. Greatest number of goals scored in matches against other teams in the tie
4. If teams remained level after all these criteria, FIFA would hold a drawing of lots

In the original version of the rules for the finals tournament, the system used during the qualifiers was in force. This system had the ranking criteria in a different order, with head-to-head results taking precedence over total goal difference. The rules were changed to the above in advance of the tournament, but older versions were still available on the FIFA and UEFA websites, causing some confusion among those trying to identify the correct criteria. In any event, the finals tournament saw only two pairs of teams level on points: Argentina and the Netherlands at 7 points in Group C; Tunisia and Saudi Arabia at 1 point in Group H. Both of these ties were resolved on total goal difference. Moreover, in both cases the teams had tied their match, so the order of ranking criteria made no difference.

== Finals tournament ==
The finals tournament of the 2006 FIFA World Cup began on 9 June. The 32 teams were divided into eight groups of four teams each, within which the teams competed in a round-robin tournament to determine which two of those four teams would advance to the sixteen-team knock-out stage, which started on 24 June. In total, 64 games were played.

=== Hosting ===
Although Germany failed to win the Cup, the tournament was considered a great success for Germany in general. Germany also experienced a sudden increase in patriotic spirit with flags waving, traditionally frowned upon by German society since World War II whenever the German team played. For the closing ceremonies, Matthias Keller composed a work performed simultaneously by the Munich Philharmonic Orchestra, the Bavarian State Orchestra and the Bavarian Radio Orchestra with conductors Christian Thielemann, Zubin Mehta and Mariss Jansons, and soloists Diana Damrau, Plácido Domingo and Lang Lang.

=== Traditional powers dominate ===
Despite early success by Australia, Ecuador, and Ghana, the tournament marked a return to dominance of traditional football powers. Four years after the 2002 tournament, in which teams from North America (the United States), Africa (Senegal) and Asia (South Korea) made it deep into the knockout stages and Turkey finished third, all eight seeded teams progressed to the knockout stages and no quarter-finalists were from outside Europe or South America. Six former champions took part in the quarter-finals, with Ukraine and Euro 2004 runners-up Portugal as the only relative outsiders. Argentina and Brazil were eliminated in the quarter-finals, leaving an all-European final four for only the fourth time (after the 1934, 1966, and 1982 tournaments).

=== Scoring ===
Despite the early goals that flooded the group stages, the knock-out phase had a much lower goals per match ratio. A prime example of the dearth of goals was Portugal, which only scored in the 23rd minute of the round of 16, and did not score again until the 88th minute of the match for third place. No player managed to score a hat-trick in this tournament, the only time this happened in the tournament's history. Italy, Germany, Argentina, Brazil and France were the only teams to score more than one goal in a knockout match. Germany was one of the exceptions, tending to play an attacking style of football throughout the knock-out stage, which was reflected by the fact that they scored the most goals (14), with players from all three outfield positions (defence, midfield and forward) making the scoresheet.

Germany's Miroslav Klose scored five goals to claim the Golden Boot, the lowest total to win the prize since 1962. No other player scored more than three goals. No player from the winning Italian squad scored more than two goals, though ten players had scored for the team, tying France's record in 1982 for the most goalscorers from any one team. For the first time ever in the FIFA World Cup, the first and last goals of the tournament were scored by defenders. German left-back Philipp Lahm scored the opener against Costa Rica after only 5 minutes of the opening match. In the final, Italian centre-back Marco Materazzi out-jumped Patrick Vieira and headed in the last goal of the 2006 World Cup. In addition, Fabio Grosso clinched the cup for Italy with the decisive spot kick in the penalty shoot-out.

=== Unprecedented number of cards ===
The tournament had a record number of yellow and red cards, breaking the previous record set by the 1998 World Cup. Players received a record-breaking 345 yellow cards and 28 red cards, with Russian referee Valentin Ivanov handing out 16 yellow and 4 red cards in the round of 16 match between Portugal and the Netherlands in a match known as the Battle of Nuremberg. Portugal had two players suspended for each of the quarter-final and semi-final matches respectively. FIFA President Sepp Blatter suggested that he might allow some rule changes for future tournaments so that earlier accumulated bookings would not force players to miss the final, should their teams make it that far. The tournament also saw English referee Graham Poll mistakenly hand out three yellow cards to Croatia's Josip Šimunić in their match against Australia. The high number of yellow and red cards show prompted discussion about the tournament's referees. FIFA officials and Blatter received criticism for allegedly making rules too rigid and taking discretion away from referees.

== Group stage ==
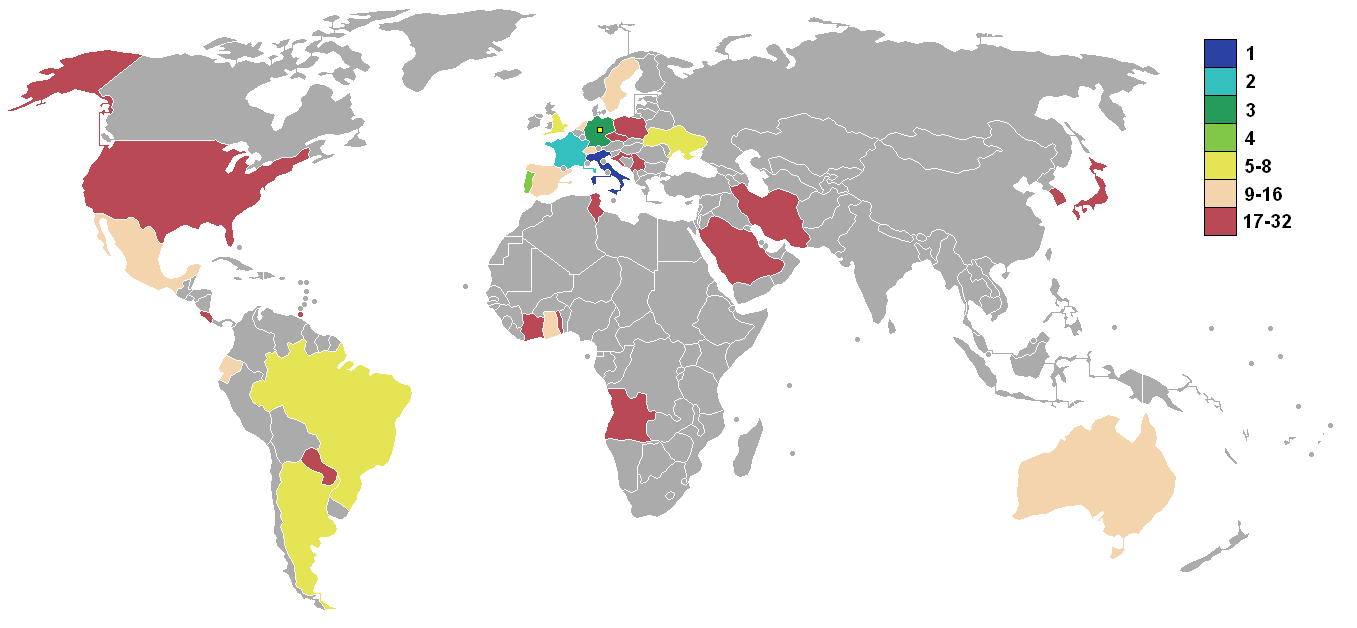
Champion Runner-up Third place Fourth place Quarter-finals Round of 16 Group stage

All times are Central European Summer Time (UTC+2).

=== Group A ===
In the opening match of the tournament, Germany and Costa Rica played a game which ended 4–2 for the host in the highest scoring opening match in the tournament's history. Germany went on to win the Group A after edging Poland and breezing past Ecuador 3–0. Despite the defeat, Ecuador had already joined the host in the Round of 16 having beaten Poland and Costa Rica 2–0 and 3–0, respectively.

Pos	Team	Pld	W	D	L	GF	GA	GD	Pts	Qualification
1	Germany (H)	3	3	0	0	8	2	+6	9	Advance to knockout stage
2	Ecuador	3	2	0	1	5	3	+2	6	Advance to knockout stage
3	Poland	3	1	0	2	2	4	−2	3	
4	Costa Rica	3	0	0	3	3	9	−6	0	

Source: FIFA
(H) Hosts

9 June 2006
Germany	4–2	Costa Rica	Allianz Arena, Munich
Poland	0–2	Ecuador	Arena AufSchalke, Gelsenkirchen
14 June 2006
Germany	1–0	Poland	Westfalenstadion, Dortmund
15 June 2006
Ecuador	3–0	Costa Rica	Volksparkstadion, Hamburg
20 June 2006
Ecuador	0–3	Germany	Olympiastadion, Berlin
Costa Rica	1–2	Poland	Niedersachsenstadion, Hanover

=== Group B ===
In Group B, England and Sweden pushed Paraguay into third place after narrow victories over the South Americans. Trinidad and Tobago earned some international respect after a draw with Sweden in their opening game and managing to hold England scoreless for 83 minutes, until goals from Peter Crouch and Steven Gerrard sealed a 2–0 win for the Three Lions. Sweden qualified for the knockout rounds after drawing 2–2 with England to maintain their 38-year unbeaten record against them.

Pos	Team	Pld	W	D	L	GF	GA	GD	Pts	Qualification
1	England	3	2	1	0	5	2	+3	7	Advance to knockout stage
2	Sweden	3	1	2	0	3	2	+1	5	Advance to knockout stage
3	Paraguay	3	1	0	2	2	2	0	3	
4	Trinidad and Tobago	3	0	1	2	0	4	−4	1	

Source: FIFA

10 June 2006
England	1–0	Paraguay	Waldstadion, Frankfurt
Trinidad and Tobago	0–0	Sweden	Westfalenstadion, Dortmund
15 June 2006
England	2–0	Trinidad and Tobago	Frankenstadion, Nuremberg
Sweden	1–0	Paraguay	Olympiastadion, Berlin
20 June 2006
Sweden	2–2	England	RheinEnergieStadion, Cologne
Paraguay	2–0	Trinidad and Tobago	Fritz-Walter-Stadion, Kaiserslautern

=== Group C ===
Both Argentina and Netherlands qualified from Group C with a game remaining. Argentina topped the group on goal difference, having hammered Serbia and Montenegro 6–0 and beaten Ivory Coast 2–1. The Dutch picked up 1–0 and 2–1 victories over Serbia and Montenegro and Ivory Coast, respectively. Ivory Coast defeated Serbia and Montenegro 3–2 in their final game, in Serbia and Montenegro's last international as the country had dissolved 18 days earlier.

Pos	Team	Pld	W	D	L	GF	GA	GD	Pts	Qualification
1	Argentina	3	2	1	0	8	1	+7	7	Advance to knockout stage
2	Netherlands	3	2	1	0	3	1	+2	7	Advance to knockout stage
3	Ivory Coast	3	1	0	2	5	6	−1	3	
4	Serbia and Montenegro	3	0	0	3	2	10	−8	0	

Source: FIFA

10 June 2006
Argentina	2–1	Ivory Coast	Volksparkstadion, Hamburg
11 June 2006
Serbia and Montenegro	0–1	Netherlands	Zentralstadion, Leipzig
16 June 2006
Argentina	6–0	Serbia and Montenegro	Arena AufSchalke, Gelsenkirchen
Netherlands	2–1	Ivory Coast	Gottlieb-Daimler-Stadion, Stuttgart
21 June 2006
Netherlands	0–0	Argentina	Waldstadion, Frankfurt
Ivory Coast	3–2	Serbia and Montenegro	Allianz Arena, Munich

=== Group D ===
Portugal coasted through in Group D, picking up the maximum number of points, with Mexico qualifying in second. Iran missed chances against Mexico in their opening 1–3 defeat and were eliminated after losing their match against Portugal. They fought hard against the Portuguese, but lost 2–0. Their last game against Angola ended in 1–1 draw. The Africans had a respectable first World Cup tournament after earning draws with Mexico (0–0) and Iran.

Pos	Team	Pld	W	D	L	GF	GA	GD	Pts	Qualification
1	Portugal	3	3	0	0	5	1	+4	9	Advance to knockout stage
2	Mexico	3	1	1	1	4	3	+1	4	Advance to knockout stage
3	Angola	3	0	2	1	1	2	−1	2	
4	Iran	3	0	1	2	2	6	−4	1	

Source: FIFA

11 June 2006
Mexico	3–1	Iran	Frankenstadion, Nuremberg
Angola	0–1	Portugal	RheinEnergieStadion, Cologne
16 June 2006
Mexico	0–0	Angola	Niedersachsenstadion, Hanover
17 June 2006
Portugal	2–0	Iran	Waldstadion, Frankfurt
21 June 2006
Portugal	2–1	Mexico	Arena AufSchalke, Gelsenkirchen
Iran	1–1	Angola	Zentralstadion, Leipzig

=== Group E ===
In Group E, Italy went through to the Round of 16 conceding just one goal (an own goal) by Cristian Zaccardo in the group phase against the United States. The US bowed out of the tournament after disappointing results against the Czech Republic and Ghana, 0–3 and 1–2, respectively, despite a 1–1 draw (finishing with 9 vs 10 men) against Italy. Tournament debutant Ghana joined Italy in the round of 16, following victories over the Czech Republic and the United States. Daniele De Rossi was suspended for 4 games following his sending-off against the United States.

Pos	Team	Pld	W	D	L	GF	GA	GD	Pts	Qualification
1	Italy	3	2	1	0	5	1	+4	7	Advance to knockout stage
2	Ghana	3	2	0	1	4	3	+1	6	Advance to knockout stage
3	Czech Republic	3	1	0	2	3	4	−1	3	
4	United States	3	0	1	2	2	6	−4	1	

Source: FIFA

12 June 2006
United States	0–3	Czech Republic	Arena AufSchalke, Gelsenkirchen
Italy	2–0	Ghana	Niedersachsenstadion, Hanover
17 June 2006
Czech Republic	0–2	Ghana	RheinEnergieStadion, Cologne
Italy	1–1	United States	Fritz-Walter-Stadion, Kaiserslautern
22 June 2006
Czech Republic	0–2	Italy	Volksparkstadion, Hamburg
Ghana	2–1	United States	Frankenstadion, Nuremberg

=== Group F ===
Group F included the reigning World Champions Brazil, Croatia, Japan, and Australia. Playing in their first World Cup for 32 years, Australia came from behind to defeat Japan 3–1, and, despite losing 0–2 to Brazil, a 2–2 draw with Croatia was enough to give the Australians a place in the Round of 16 in a game where two players were sent-off for second bookings and one, erroneously, for a third booking by English referee Graham Poll. The Brazilians won all three games to qualify first in the group. Their 1–0 win against Croatia was through a goal late in the first-half by Kaká. Croatia and Japan went out of the tournament without a single win.

Pos	Team	Pld	W	D	L	GF	GA	GD	Pts	Qualification
1	Brazil	3	3	0	0	7	1	+6	9	Advance to knockout stage
2	Australia	3	1	1	1	5	5	0	4	Advance to knockout stage
3	Croatia	3	0	2	1	2	3	−1	2	
4	Japan	3	0	1	2	2	7	−5	1	

Source: FIFA

12 June 2006
Australia	3–1	Japan	Fritz-Walter-Stadion, Kaiserslautern
13 June 2006
Brazil	1–0	Croatia	Olympiastadion, Berlin
18 June 2006
Japan	0–0	Croatia	Frankenstadion, Nuremberg
Brazil	2–0	Australia	Allianz Arena, Munich
22 June 2006
Japan	1–4	Brazil	Westfalenstadion, Dortmund
Croatia	2–2	Australia	Gottlieb-Daimler-Stadion, Stuttgart

=== Group G ===
France only managed a scoreless draw against Switzerland and a 1–1 draw against South Korea. With captain Zinedine Zidane suspended, their 2–0 win against Togo was enough for them to advance to the knockout round. They were joined by the group winners, Switzerland, who defeated South Korea 2–0, and did not concede a goal in the tournament. South Korea won their first World Cup finals match outside their own country in defeating Togo, but four points were not enough to see them through to the round of 16 (the only team for which this was the case), while Togo exited without a point.

Pos	Team	Pld	W	D	L	GF	GA	GD	Pts	Qualification
1	Switzerland	3	2	1	0	4	0	+4	7	Advance to knockout stage
2	France	3	1	2	0	3	1	+2	5	Advance to knockout stage
3	South Korea	3	1	1	1	3	4	−1	4	
4	Togo	3	0	0	3	1	6	−5	0	

Source: FIFA

13 June 2006
South Korea	2–1	Togo	Waldstadion, Frankfurt
France	0–0	Switzerland	Gottlieb-Daimler-Stadion, Stuttgart
18 June 2006
France	1–1	South Korea	Zentralstadion, Leipzig
19 June 2006
Togo	0–2	Switzerland	Westfalenstadion, Dortmund
23 June 2006
Togo	0–2	France	RheinEnergieStadion, Cologne
Switzerland	2–0	South Korea	Niedersachsenstadion, Hanover

=== Group H ===
Spain dominated Group H, picking up the maximum number of points, scoring 8 goals, and conceding only 1. Ukraine, despite being beaten 4–0 by Spain in their first World Cup game, took advantage of the weaker opponents to beat Saudi Arabia 4–0 and scrape past Tunisia 1–0 thanks to a 70th-minute penalty by Andriy Shevchenko, to reach the Round of 16. Saudi Arabia and Tunisia went out of the tournament having 1 point each, thanks to a 2–2 draw against each other.

Pos	Team	Pld	W	D	L	GF	GA	GD	Pts	Qualification
1	Spain	3	3	0	0	8	1	+7	9	Advance to knockout stage
2	Ukraine	3	2	0	1	5	4	+1	6	Advance to knockout stage
3	Tunisia	3	0	1	2	3	6	−3	1	
4	Saudi Arabia	3	0	1	2	2	7	−5	1	

Source: FIFA

14 June 2006
Spain	4–0	Ukraine	Zentralstadion, Leipzig
Tunisia	2–2	Saudi Arabia	Allianz Arena, Munich
19 June 2006
Saudi Arabia	0–4	Ukraine	Volksparkstadion, Hamburg
Spain	3–1	Tunisia	Gottlieb-Daimler-Stadion, Stuttgart
23 June 2006
Saudi Arabia	0–1	Spain	Fritz-Walter-Stadion, Kaiserslautern
Ukraine	1–0	Tunisia	Olympiastadion, Berlin

== Knockout stage ==
The knockout stage involved the sixteen teams that qualified from the group stage of the tournament. There were four rounds of matches, with each round eliminating half of the teams entering that round. The successive rounds were: round of 16, quarter-finals, semi-finals, and final. There was also a match for third place between the losing semi-finalists. For each game in the knockout stage, a draw was followed by thirty minutes of extra time (two 15-minute halves); if scores were still level there would be a penalty shoot-out (at least five penalties each, and more if necessary) to determine who progressed to the next round.

=== Bracket ===
Results decided after extra time are indicated by (a.e.t.), and results decided via a penalty shoot-out are indicated by (p).

Round of 16
24 June – Munich
Germany	2
Sweden	0
24 June – Leipzig
Argentina (a.e.t.)	2
Mexico	1
26 June – Kaiserslautern
Italy	1
Australia	0
26 June – Cologne
Switzerland	0 (0)
Ukraine (p)	0 (3)
25 June – Stuttgart
England	1
Ecuador	0
25 June – Nuremberg
Portugal	1
Netherlands	0
27 June – Dortmund
Brazil	3
Ghana	0
27 June – Hanover
Spain	1
France	3

Quarter-finals
30 June – Berlin
Germany (p)	1 (4)
Argentina	1 (2)
30 June – Hamburg
Italy	3
Ukraine	0
1 July – Gelsenkirchen
England	0 (1)
Portugal (p)	0 (3)
1 July – Frankfurt
Brazil	0
France	1

Semi-finals
4 July – Dortmund
Germany	0
Italy (a.e.t.)	2
5 July – Munich
Portugal	0
France	1

Final
9 July – Berlin
Italy (p)	1 (5)
France	1 (3)
Match for third place
8 July – Stuttgart
Germany	3
Portugal	1

=== Round of 16 ===
In the second round, conceding two early goals in the first twelve minutes to Germany effectively ended the Swedes' hopes of progressing to the quarter-finals. Argentina struggled to get past Mexico until a Maxi Rodríguez goal in extra time put the Albiceleste in the quarter-finals. Australia's journey ended when Italy were awarded a controversial penalty scored by Francesco Totti, deep into the remaining seconds of the match, after Fabio Grosso went down in the penalty box. The Italians had spent much of the game with only ten men on the field, following a controversial red card shown to centre back Marco Materazzi. In a 0–0 match, described in The Guardian as "the dullest game in World Cup history", Switzerland failed to convert any of their three penalties in the penalty shoot-out against Ukraine to see them exit the competition with an unwanted new record in becoming the first team in a World Cup to fail to convert any penalties in a shoot-out. Their elimination also meant that they became the first nation to be eliminated from the World Cup without conceding any goals (and indeed the only nation ever to participate in a World Cup finals tournament without conceding a goal). No two teams from the same group qualified for the quarters, all eight teams were from different groups.

England struggled against Ecuador but won 1–0 thanks to a David Beckham free kick. Brazil won 3–0 against Ghana, in a game which included Ronaldo's record 15th World Cup goal. Der Spiegel reported that the match may have been influenced by an Asian betting syndicate. Portugal defeated the Netherlands 1–0. The only goal came courtesy of a Maniche strike in an acrimonious match, which marked a new World Cup record with 16 yellow cards (Portugal: 9, the Netherlands: 7) and 4 players being sent off for a second bookable offence. France came from behind to defeat Spain 3–1 thanks to goals from Franck Ribéry, Patrick Vieira, and Zinedine Zidane.

24 June 2006
17:00

Germany	2–0	Sweden
Podolski 4', 12'

Allianz Arena, Munich
Attendance: 66,000
Referee: Carlos Eugênio Simon (Brazil)

24 June 2006
21:00

Argentina	2–1 (a.e.t.)	Mexico
Crespo 10'; Rodríguez 98'		Márquez 5'

Zentralstadion, Leipzig
Attendance: 43,000
Referee: Massimo Busacca (Switzerland)

25 June 2006
17:00

England	1–0	Ecuador
Beckham 60'

Gottlieb-Daimler-Stadion, Stuttgart
Attendance: 52,000
Referee: Frank De Bleeckere (Belgium)

25 June 2006
21:00

Portugal	1–0	Netherlands
Maniche 23'

Frankenstadion, Nuremberg
Attendance: 41,000
Referee: Valentin Ivanov (Russia)

26 June 2006
17:00

Italy	1–0	Australia
Totti 90+5' (pen.)

Fritz-Walter-Stadion, Kaiserslautern
Attendance: 46,000
Referee: Luis Medina Cantalejo (Spain)

26 June 2006
21:00

Switzerland	0–0 (a.e.t.)	Ukraine
Penalties
Streller (penalty missed); Barnetta (penalty missed); Cabanas (penalty missed)	0–3	(penalty missed) Shevchenko; (penalty scored) Milevskyi; (penalty scored) Rebrov; (penalty scored) Husiev

RheinEnergieStadion, Cologne
Attendance: 45,000
Referee: Benito Archundia (Mexico)

27 June 2006
17:00

Brazil	3–0	Ghana
Ronaldo 5'; Adriano 45+1'; Zé Roberto 84'

Westfalenstadion, Dortmund
Attendance: 65,000
Referee: Ľuboš Micheľ (Slovakia)

27 June 2006
21:00

Spain	1–3	France
Villa 28' (pen.)		Ribéry 41'; Vieira 83'; Zidane 90+2'

Niedersachsenstadion, Hanover
Attendance: 43,000
Referee: Roberto Rosetti (Italy)

=== Quarter-finals ===
Germany and Argentina ended 1–1 after extra time; the hosts edged out the Argentinians 4–2 on penalties to go through to the semi-finals (this was the first time Argentina had lost a World Cup penalty shoot-out: up until this match, Argentina and Germany had each participated in three penalty shoot-outs, winning all of them). In Gelsenkirchen, England faced Portugal in a repeat of their Euro 2004 quarter-final. This time Wayne Rooney was sent off, and Portugal again won on penalties, 3–1 after a 0–0 draw to reach their first World Cup semi-final since the days of Eusébio 40 years earlier. This gave manager Luiz Felipe Scolari his third consecutive tournament quarter-final win over Sven-Göran Eriksson's England, first with Brazil en route to their 2002 World Cup win, then with Portugal in 2004 and 2006. Italy defeated quarter-final debutants Ukraine 3–0. France eliminated Brazil 1–0 to advance into the semi-finals. Brazil only managed one shot on goal, while Zinedine Zidane's dribbling earned him Man of the Match and his free-kick to Thierry Henry resulted in the winning goal.

30 June 2006
17:00

Germany	1–1 (a.e.t.)	Argentina
Klose 80'		Ayala 49'
Penalties
Neuville (penalty scored); Ballack (penalty scored); Podolski (penalty scored); Borowski (penalty scored)	4–2	(penalty scored) Cruz; (penalty missed) Ayala; (penalty scored) Rodríguez; (penalty missed) Cambiasso

Olympiastadion, Berlin
Attendance: 72,000
Referee: Ľuboš Micheľ (Slovakia)

30 June 2006
21:00

Italy	3–0	Ukraine
Zambrotta 6'; Toni 59', 69'

Volksparkstadion, Hamburg
Attendance: 50,000
Referee: Frank De Bleeckere (Belgium)

1 July 2006
17:00

England	0–0 (a.e.t.)	Portugal
Penalties
Lampard (penalty missed); Hargreaves (penalty scored); Gerrard (penalty missed); Carragher (penalty missed)	1–3	(penalty scored) Simão; (penalty missed) Viana; (penalty missed) Petit; (penalty scored) Postiga; (penalty scored) Ronaldo

Arena AufSchalke, Gelsenkirchen
Attendance: 52,000
Referee: Horacio Elizondo (Argentina)

1 July 2006
21:00

Brazil	0–1	France
		Henry 57'

Waldstadion, Frankfurt
Attendance: 48,000
Referee: Luis Medina Cantalejo (Spain)

=== Semi-finals ===
With Argentina and Brazil eliminated in the quarter-finals, an all-European semi-final line up was completed for only the fourth time (after the 1934, 1966 and 1982 tournaments—this would happen again in 2018). The semi-final between Germany and Italy produced an extra time period that went scoreless until the 118th minute, when Italy scored twice through Fabio Grosso and Alessandro Del Piero, putting an end to Germany's undefeated record in Dortmund. In the second semi-final, a repeat of the Euro 1984 and Euro 2000 semi-finals, Portugal were defeated 1-0 by France, with the decisive goal being a penalty scored by France captain Zinedine Zidane.

4 July 2006
21:00

Germany	0–2 (a.e.t.)	Italy
		Grosso 119'; Del Piero 120+1'

Westfalenstadion, Dortmund
Attendance: 65,000
Referee: Benito Archundia (Mexico)

5 July 2006
21:00

Portugal	0–1	France
		Zidane 33' (pen.)

Allianz Arena, Munich
Attendance: 66,000
Referee: Jorge Larrionda (Uruguay)

=== Match for third place ===
The hosts got three goals in 20 minutes in the second half with the help of 21-year-old left midfielder Bastian Schweinsteiger. His first goal beat the Portuguese goalkeeper Ricardo with pace over his head. Only 4 minutes later, Schweinsteiger's free kick 30 metres from the left of the penalty box, driven low across goal, was connected with Petit's knee to become an own goal for Portugal. The German did not stop, and netted his second goal, which swerved away to the keeper's left, in the 78th minute. Portugal were strong in possession but lacked punch in attack; unable to convert 57% possession into goals. Pauleta had two clear chances from 15 metres, but both times hit tame shots that did not trouble keeper Oliver Kahn, who was playing in his last match for the German national team. Portugal got a consolation goal with the help of substitute Luís Figo (also playing the final international game of his career), who almost immediately provided the precise distribution needed to unlock the German defence. A cross from the right wing on 88 minutes found fellow substitute Nuno Gomes at the far post, who dived in for the goal. The game ended 3–1, a result which gave the tournament hosts the bronze medals and left Portugal in fourth place.

8 July 2006
21:00

Germany	3–1	Portugal
Schweinsteiger 56', 78'; Petit 60' (o.g.)		Nuno Gomes 88'

Gottlieb-Daimler-Stadion, Stuttgart
Attendance: 52,000
Referee: Toru Kamikawa (Japan)

=== Final ===
The final started with each side scoring within the first 20 minutes. Zinedine Zidane opened the scoring by converting a controversial seventh-minute penalty kick, which glanced off the underside of the crossbar and bounced beyond the goal line before it spun back up, hit the crossbar again and rebounded out of the goal. Marco Materazzi then levelled the scores in the 19th minute following an Andrea Pirlo corner. Both teams had chances to score the winning goal in normal time: Luca Toni hit the crossbar in the 35th minute for Italy (he later had a header disallowed for offside), while France were not awarded a possible second penalty in the 53rd minute when Florent Malouda went down in the box after a tackle from Gianluca Zambrotta. The reverse camera angle later made it clear that there was no penalty and that the referee took the right decision. At the end of the regulation 90 minutes, the score was still level at 1–1, and the match went into extra time. Italian goalkeeper Gianluigi Buffon made a potentially game-saving save in extra time when he tipped a Zidane header over the crossbar. Further controversy ensued near the end of extra time, when Zidane head-butted Materazzi in the chest in an off-the-ball incident and was sent off. Extra time produced no further goals and a penalty shoot-out followed, which Italy won 5–3. France's David Trezeguet, the man who scored the golden goal against Italy in Euro 2000, was the only player not to score his penalty; his spot kick hit the crossbar, landed on the goal line, and went out. It was the first all-European final since Italy's triumph over West Germany in the 1982 World Cup, and the second final, after 1994, to be decided on penalties. It was also Italy's first world title in 24 years, and their fourth overall, making them the second most successful World Cup team ever. The victory also helped Italy top the FIFA World Rankings in February 2007 for the first time since November 1993.

9 July 2006
20:00 CEST

Italy	1–1 (a.e.t.)	France
Materazzi 19'		Zidane 7' (pen.)
Penalties
Pirlo (penalty scored); Materazzi (penalty scored); De Rossi (penalty scored); Del Piero (penalty scored); Grosso (penalty scored)	5–3	(penalty scored) Wiltord; (penalty missed) Trezeguet; (penalty scored) Abidal; (penalty scored) Sagnol

Olympiastadion, Berlin
Attendance: 69,000
Referee: Horacio Elizondo (Argentina)

== Statistics ==
=== Goal scorers ===
Miroslav Klose received the Golden Boot for scoring five goals in the World Cup. In total, 147 goals were scored by 110 players, with four of them credited as own goals.

5 goals

- (Germany) Miroslav Klose

3 goals

- (Brazil) Ronaldo
- (Argentina) Hernán Crespo
- (Argentina) Maxi Rodríguez
- (France) Thierry Henry
- (France) Zinedine Zidane
- (Germany) Lukas Podolski
- (Spain) Fernando Torres
- (Spain) David Villa

2 goals

- (Australia) Tim Cahill
- (Brazil) Adriano
- (Costa Rica) Paulo Wanchope
- (Czech Republic) Tomáš Rosický
- (Ecuador) Agustín Delgado
- (Ecuador) Carlos Tenorio
- (England) Steven Gerrard
- (France) Patrick Vieira
- (Germany) Bastian Schweinsteiger
- (Italy) Marco Materazzi
- (Italy) Luca Toni
- (Ivory Coast) Aruna Dindane
- (Mexico) Omar Bravo
- (Poland) Bartosz Bosacki
- (Portugal) Maniche
- (Switzerland) Alexander Frei
- (Ukraine) Andriy Shevchenko

1 goal

- (Angola) Flávio
- (Argentina) Roberto Ayala
- (Argentina) Esteban Cambiasso
- (Argentina) Lionel Messi
- (Argentina) Javier Saviola
- (Argentina) Carlos Tevez
- (Australia) John Aloisi
- (Australia) Harry Kewell
- (Australia) Craig Moore
- (Brazil) Fred
- (Brazil) Gilberto
- (Brazil) Juninho
- (Brazil) Kaká
- (Brazil) Zé Roberto
- (Costa Rica) Rónald Gómez
- (Croatia) Niko Kovač
- (Croatia) Darijo Srna
- (Czech Republic) Jan Koller
- (Ecuador) Iván Kaviedes
- (England) David Beckham
- (England) Joe Cole
- (England) Peter Crouch
- (France) Franck Ribéry
- (Germany) Torsten Frings
- (Germany) Philipp Lahm
- (Germany) Oliver Neuville
- (Ghana) Stephen Appiah
- (Ghana) Haminu Draman
- (Ghana) Asamoah Gyan
- (Ghana) Sulley Muntari
- (Iran) Sohrab Bakhtiarizadeh
- (Iran) Yahya Golmohammadi
- (Italy) Alessandro Del Piero
- (Italy) Alberto Gilardino
- (Italy) Fabio Grosso
- (Italy) Vincenzo Iaquinta
- (Italy) Filippo Inzaghi
- (Italy) Andrea Pirlo
- (Italy) Francesco Totti
- (Italy) Gianluca Zambrotta
- (Ivory Coast) Didier Drogba
- (Ivory Coast) Bonaventure Kalou
- (Ivory Coast) Bakari Koné
- (Japan) Shunsuke Nakamura
- (Japan) Keiji Tamada
- (Mexico) Francisco Fonseca
- (Mexico) Rafael Márquez
- (Mexico) Sinha
- (Netherlands) Ruud van Nistelrooy
- (Netherlands) Robin van Persie
- (Netherlands) Arjen Robben
- (Paraguay) Nelson Cuevas
- (Portugal) Cristiano Ronaldo
- (Portugal) Deco
- (Portugal) Nuno Gomes
- (Portugal) Pauleta
- (Portugal) Simão
- (Saudi Arabia) Sami Al-Jaber
- (Saudi Arabia) Yasser Al-Qahtani
- (Serbia and Montenegro) Saša Ilić
- (Serbia and Montenegro) Nikola Žigić
- (South Korea) Ahn Jung-hwan
- (South Korea) Lee Chun-soo
- (South Korea) Park Ji-sung
- (Spain) Xabi Alonso
- (Spain) Juanito
- (Spain) Raúl
- (Sweden) Marcus Allbäck
- (Sweden) Henrik Larsson
- (Sweden) Freddie Ljungberg
- (Switzerland) Tranquillo Barnetta
- (Switzerland) Philippe Senderos
- (Togo) Mohamed Kader
- (Tunisia) Radhi Jaïdi
- (Tunisia) Ziad Jaziri
- (Tunisia) Jawhar Mnari
- (Ukraine) Maksym Kalynychenko
- (Ukraine) Serhiy Rebrov
- (Ukraine) Andriy Rusol
- (United States) Clint Dempsey

1 own goal

- (Italy) Cristian Zaccardo (against the United States)
- (Paraguay) Carlos Gamarra (against England)
- (Portugal) Petit (against Germany)
- (Trinidad and Tobago) Brent Sancho (against Paraguay)

=== Discipline ===
Player	Offence(s)	Suspension(s)
(Trinidad and Tobago) Avery John	(yellow card) (yellow-red card) in Group B vs Sweden (matchday 1; 10 June)	Group B vs England (matchday 2; 15 June)
(Togo) Jean-Paul Abalo	(yellow card) (yellow-red card) in Group G vs South Korea (matchday 1; 13 June)	Group G vs Switzerland (matchday 2; 19 June)
(Ukraine) Vladyslav Vashchuk	(red card) in Group H vs Spain (matchday 1; 14 June)	Group H vs Saudi Arabia (matchday 2; 19 June)
(Poland) Radosław Sobolewski	(yellow card) (yellow-red card) in Group A vs Germany (matchday 2; 14 June)	Group A vs Costa Rica (matchday 3; 20 June)
(Serbia and Montenegro) Ognjen Koroman	(yellow card) in Group C vs Netherlands (matchday 1; 11 June); (yellow card) in Group C vs Argentina (matchday 2; 16 June)	Group C vs Ivory Coast (matchday 3; 21 June)
(Serbia and Montenegro) Mateja Kežman	(red card) in Group C vs Argentina (matchday 2; 16 June)	Group C vs Ivory Coast (matchday 3; 21 June)
(Ivory Coast) Didier Drogba	(yellow card) in Group C vs Argentina (matchday 1; 10 June); (yellow card) in Group C vs Netherlands (matchday 2; 16 June)	Group C vs Serbia and Montenegro (matchday 3; 21 June)
(Angola) André Macanga	(yellow card) (yellow-red card) in Group D vs Mexico (matchday 2; 16 June)	Group D vs Iran (matchday 3; 21 June)
(Iran) Javad Nekounam	(yellow card) in Group D vs Mexico (matchday 1; 11 June); (yellow card) in Group D vs Portugal (matchday 2; 17 June)	Group D vs Angola (matchday 3; 21 June)
(Czech Republic) Tomáš Ujfaluši	(red card) in Group E vs Ghana (matchday 2; 17 June)	Group E vs Italy (matchday 3; 22 June)
(Czech Republic) Vratislav Lokvenc	(yellow card) in Group E vs United States (matchday 1; 12 June); (yellow card) in Group E vs Ghana (matchday 2; 17 June)	Group E vs Italy (matchday 3; 22 June)
(Ghana) Asamoah Gyan	(yellow card) in Group E vs Italy (matchday 1; 12 June); (yellow card) in Group E vs Czech Republic (matchday 2; 17 June)	Group E vs United States (matchday 3; 22 June)
(Ghana) Sulley Muntari	(yellow card) in Group E vs Italy (matchday 1; 12 June); (yellow card) in Group E vs Czech Republic (matchday 2; 17 June)	Group E vs United States (matchday 3; 22 June)
(Italy) Daniele De Rossi	(red card) in Group E vs United States (matchday 2; 17 June)	Group E vs Czech Republic (matchday 3; 22 June); Round of 16 vs Australia (26 June); Quarter-finals vs Ukraine (30 June); Semi-finals vs Germany (4 July)
(United States) Pablo Mastroeni	(red card) in Group E vs Italy (matchday 2; 17 June)	Group E vs Ghana (matchday 3; 22 June)
(United States) Eddie Pope	(yellow card) (yellow-red card) in Group E vs Italy (matchday 2; 17 June)	Group E vs Ghana (matchday 3; 22 June)
(Japan) Tsuneyasu Miyamoto	(yellow card) in Group F vs Australia (matchday 1; 12 June); (yellow card) in Group F vs Croatia (matchday 2; 18 June)	Group F vs Brazil (matchday 3; 22 June)
(Croatia) Robert Kovač	(yellow card) in Group F vs Brazil (matchday 1; 13 June); (yellow card) in Group F vs Japan (matchday 2; 18 June)	Group F vs Australia (matchday 3; 22 June)
(France) Eric Abidal	(yellow card) in Group G vs Switzerland (matchday 1; 13 June); (yellow card) in Group G vs South Korea (matchday 2; 18 June)	Group G vs Togo (matchday 3; 23 June)
(France) Zinedine Zidane	(yellow card) in Group G vs Switzerland (matchday 1; 13 June); (yellow card) in Group G vs South Korea (matchday 2; 18 June)	Group G vs Togo (matchday 3; 23 June)
(Togo) Alaixys Romao	(yellow card) in Group G vs South Korea (matchday 1; 13 June); (yellow card) in Group G vs Switzerland (matchday 2; 19 June)	Group G vs France (matchday 3; 23 June)
(Mexico) Luis Ernesto Pérez	(yellow card) (yellow-red card) in Group D vs Portugal (matchday 3; 21 June)	Round of 16 vs Argentina (24 June)
(Serbia and Montenegro) Albert Nađ	(yellow card) (yellow-red card) in Group C vs Ivory Coast (matchday 3; 21 June)	Suspension served outside tournament
(Ivory Coast) Cyril Domoraud	(yellow card) (yellow-red card) in Group C vs Serbia and Montenegro (matchday 3; 21 June)	Suspension served outside tournament
(Ghana) Michael Essien	(yellow card) in Group E vs Czech Republic (matchday 2; 17 June); (yellow card) in Group E vs United States (matchday 3; 22 June)	Round of 16 vs Brazil (27 June)
(Czech Republic) Jan Polák	(yellow card) (yellow-red card) in Group E vs Italy (matchday 3; 22 June)	Suspension served outside tournament
(Croatia) Dario Šimić	(yellow card) (yellow-red card) in Group F vs Australia (matchday 3; 22 June)	Suspension served outside tournament
(Australia) Brett Emerton	(yellow card) (yellow-red card) in Group F vs Croatia (matchday 3; 22 June)	Round of 16 vs Italy (26 June)
(Croatia) Josip Šimunić	(yellow card) (yellow-red card) in Group F vs Australia (matchday 3; 22 June)	Suspension served outside tournament
(Ukraine) Vyacheslav Sviderskyi	(yellow card) in Group H vs Saudi Arabia (matchday 2; 19 June); (yellow card) in Group H vs Tunisia (matchday 3; 23 June)	Round of 16 vs Switzerland (26 June)
(Tunisia) Ziad Jaziri	(yellow card) (yellow-red card) in Group H vs Tunisia (matchday 3; 23 June)	Suspension served outside tournament
(Sweden) Teddy Lučić	(yellow card) (yellow-red card) in Round of 16 vs Germany (24 June)	Suspension served outside tournament
(Portugal) Costinha	(yellow card) (yellow-red card) in Round of 16 vs Netherlands (25 June)	Quarter-finals vs England (1 July)
(Netherlands) Khalid Boulahrouz	(yellow card) (yellow-red card) in Round of 16 vs Portugal (25 June)	Suspension served outside tournament
(Portugal) Deco	(yellow card) (yellow-red card) in Round of 16 vs Netherlands (25 June)	Quarter-finals vs England (1 July)
(Netherlands) Giovanni van Bronckhorst	(yellow card) (yellow-red card) in Round of 16 vs Portugal (25 June)	Suspension served outside tournament
(Italy) Marco Materazzi	(red card) in Round of 16 vs Australia (26 June)	Quarter-finals vs Ukraine (30 June)
(Ghana) Asamoah Gyan	(yellow card) (yellow-red card) in Round of 16 vs Brazil (27 June)	Suspension served outside tournament
(Argentina) Leandro Cufré	(red card) in Quarter-finals vs Germany (30 June)	Suspension served outside tournament
(Portugal) Petit	(yellow card) in Round of 16 vs Netherlands (25 June); (yellow card) in Quarter-finals vs England (1 July)	Semi-finals vs France (5 July)
(England) Wayne Rooney	(red card) in Quarter-finals vs Portugal (1 July)	Suspension served outside tournament
(Portugal) Ricardo Carvalho	(yellow card) in Quarter-finals vs England (1 July); (yellow card) in Semi-finals vs France (5 July)	Match for third place vs Germany (8 July)
(France) Louis Saha	(yellow card) in Quarter-finals vs Brazil (1 July); (yellow card) in Semi-finals vs Portugal (5 July)	Final vs Italy (9 July)
(France) Zinedine Zidane	(red card) in Final vs Italy (9 July)	Suspension served outside tournament

The 2006 tournament holds the record for the most red cards in a single FIFA World Cup, with a total of 28 red cards issued.

=== Awards ===
Golden Boot Winner	Golden Ball Winner	Yashin Award	Best Young Player	FIFA Fair Play Trophy	Most Entertaining Team
(Germany) Miroslav Klose	(France) Zinedine Zidane	(Italy) Gianluigi Buffon	(Germany) Lukas Podolski	Brazil; Spain	Portugal

FIFA's Technical Study Group (TSG) also granted a Man of the Match award to one player in each match. Italy's Andrea Pirlo won the most Man of the Match awards with three in total. Miroslav Klose, Agustín Delgado, Arjen Robben, Zé Roberto, Alexander Frei, Michael Ballack and Patrick Vieira each received two awards.

=== All-star team ===
The All-star team is a squad consisting of the 23 most impressive players at the 2006 World Cup, as selected by FIFA's Technical Study Group. The team was chosen from a shortlist of over 50 players, and was selected based on performances from the second round onwards.

Goalkeepers	Defenders	Midfielders	Forwards
(Italy) Gianluigi Buffon (Germany) Jens Lehmann (Portugal) Ricardo	(Argentina) Roberto Ayala (England) John Terry (France) Lilian Thuram (Germany) Philipp Lahm (Italy) Fabio Cannavaro (Italy) Gianluca Zambrotta (Portugal) Ricardo Carvalho	(Brazil) Zé Roberto (France) Patrick Vieira (France) Zinedine Zidane (Germany) Michael Ballack (Italy) Andrea Pirlo (Italy) Gennaro Gattuso (Italy) Francesco Totti (Portugal) Luís Figo (Portugal) Maniche	(Argentina) Hernán Crespo (France) Thierry Henry (Germany) Miroslav Klose (Italy) Luca Toni

=== Prize money ===
A total of CHF332 million was awarded to the 32 teams participating in the tournament. Each team who entered the competition received CHF2 million, with the biggest prize being CHF24.5 million, awarded to the winner of the tournament. Below is a complete list of the prize money allocated:

- CHF7 million – To each team eliminated in the group stage (16 teams)
- CHF8.5 million – To each team eliminated in the round of 16 (8 teams)
- CHF11.5 million – To each team eliminated in the quarter-finals (4 teams)
- CHF21.5 million – Fourth placed team and Third placed team
- CHF22.5 million – Runners-up
- CHF24.5 million – Winner

=== Tournament ranking ===
Per statistical convention in football, matches decided in extra time are counted as wins and losses, while matches decided by penalty shoot-outs are counted as draws.

Pos	Grp	Team	Pld	W	D	L	GF	GA	GD	Pts	Final result
1	E	Italy	7	5	2	0	12	2	+10	17	Champions
2	G	France	7	4	3	0	9	3	+6	15	Runners-up
3	A	Germany (H)	7	5	1	1	14	6	+8	16	Third place
4	D	Portugal	7	4	1	2	7	5	+2	13	Fourth place
5	F	Brazil	5	4	0	1	10	2	+8	12	Eliminated in quarter-finals
6	C	Argentina	5	3	2	0	11	3	+8	11	Eliminated in quarter-finals
7	B	England	5	3	2	0	6	2	+4	11	Eliminated in quarter-finals
8	H	Ukraine	5	2	1	2	5	7	−2	7	Eliminated in quarter-finals
9	H	Spain	4	3	0	1	9	4	+5	9	Eliminated in round of 16
10	G	Switzerland	4	2	2	0	4	0	+4	8	Eliminated in round of 16
11	C	Netherlands	4	2	1	1	3	2	+1	7	Eliminated in round of 16
12	A	Ecuador	4	2	0	2	5	4	+1	6	Eliminated in round of 16
13	E	Ghana	4	2	0	2	4	6	−2	6	Eliminated in round of 16
14	B	Sweden	4	1	2	1	3	4	−1	5	Eliminated in round of 16
15	D	Mexico	4	1	1	2	5	5	0	4	Eliminated in round of 16
16	F	Australia	4	1	1	2	5	6	−1	4	Eliminated in round of 16
17	G	South Korea	3	1	1	1	3	4	−1	4	Eliminated in group stage
18	B	Paraguay	3	1	0	2	2	2	0	3	Eliminated in group stage
19	C	Ivory Coast	3	1	0	2	5	6	−1	3	Eliminated in group stage
20	E	Czech Republic	3	1	0	2	3	4	−1	3	Eliminated in group stage
21	A	Poland	3	1	0	2	2	4	−2	3	Eliminated in group stage
22	F	Croatia	3	0	2	1	2	3	−1	2	Eliminated in group stage
23	D	Angola	3	0	2	1	1	2	−1	2	Eliminated in group stage
24	H	Tunisia	3	0	1	2	3	6	−3	1	Eliminated in group stage
=25	D	Iran	3	0	1	2	2	6	−4	1	Eliminated in group stage
=25	E	United States	3	0	1	2	2	6	−4	1	Eliminated in group stage
27	B	Trinidad and Tobago	3	0	1	2	0	4	−4	1	Eliminated in group stage
=28	F	Japan	3	0	1	2	2	7	−5	1	Eliminated in group stage
=28	H	Saudi Arabia	3	0	1	2	2	7	−5	1	Eliminated in group stage
30	G	Togo	3	0	0	3	1	6	−5	0	Eliminated in group stage
31	A	Costa Rica	3	0	0	3	3	9	−6	0	Eliminated in group stage
32	C	Serbia and Montenegro	3	0	0	3	2	10	−8	0	Eliminated in group stage

Source: FIFA
(H) Hosts

== Fan Fests ==
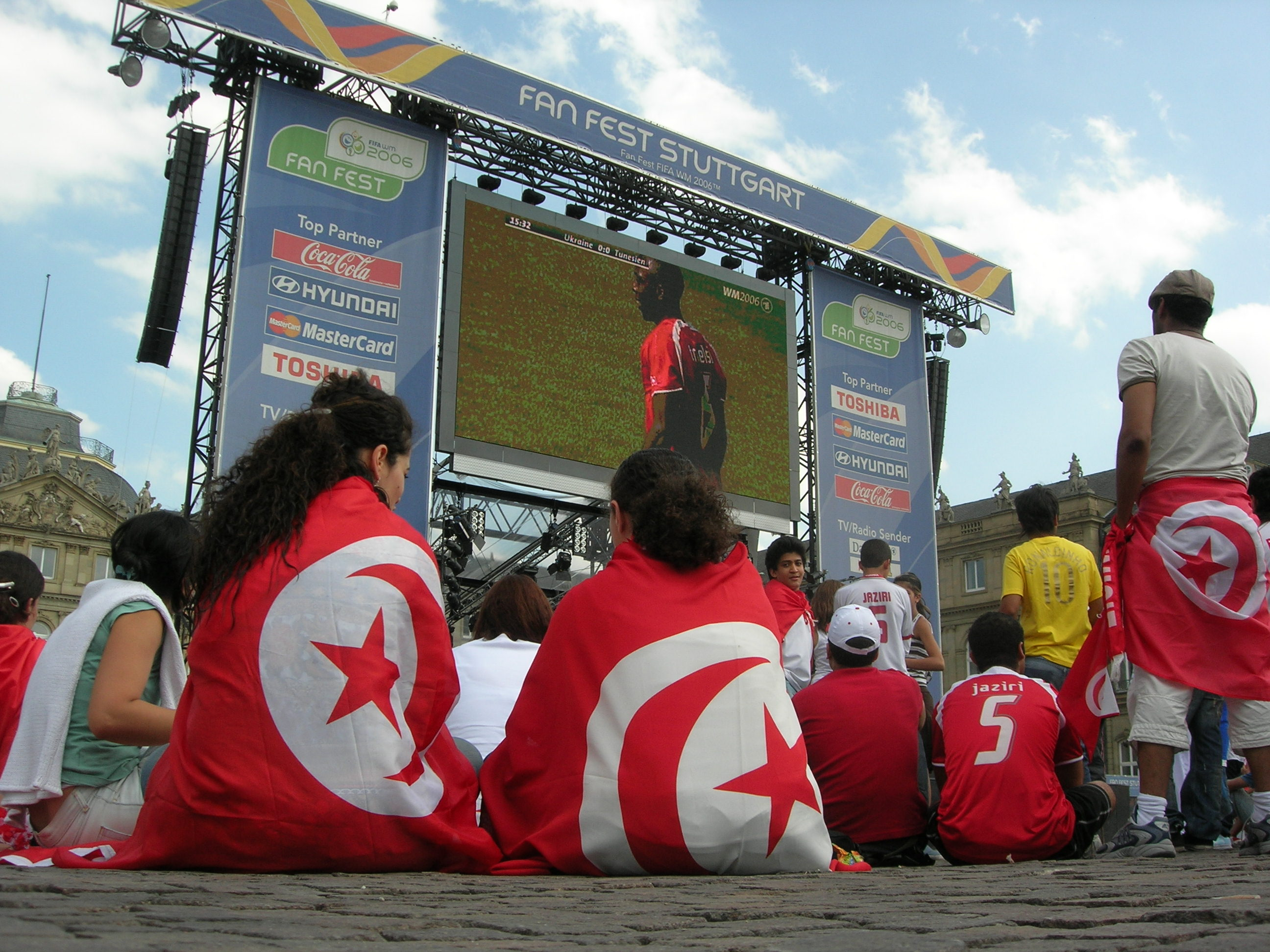
Tunisian supporters watching their match against Ukraine at the Fan Fest in Stuttgart

In preparation for the tournament, FIFA and the Organising Committee sought a way to accommodate people planning to visit. The experience of past World Cups and public viewing was conceptualized in 4-week-long events for football supporters to meet, board, interact, partake in cultural activities and watch all 64 matches on giant video walls. Since 2004, the details on costs, logistics, safety issues, marketing and broadcasting rights were jointly hammered out by FIFA and the host cities. These public viewing events, known as "Fan Fests" (German: Fanmeile), served an idea to provide football supporters without tickets a legitimate opportunity to partake in the World Cup. Unlike the past tournaments where ticket-less fans were treated as security risks, the World Cup in Germany welcomed all supporters, thus generating positive atmosphere even before the tournament began. Even though security planners and media were sceptical and cautious on the matter of public viewing, the scepticism was cast aside with the beginning of the World Cup.

Fan Fests for the World Cup were set up in 12 host cities and attracted 21 million visitors over the duration of tournament according to German National Tourist Board (FIFA claimed there were over 18 million visitors). The Berlin Fan Fest was located at the pedestrianised Straße des 17. Juni, between Brandenburg Gate and the Victory Column, with 14 consecutive video walls attracted 9 million fans over the duration of World Cup with nearly a million supporters in each match that Germany played. For the first time in German history, an event scored more visitors than Oktoberfest. The Cologne Fan Fest scored 3 million visitors, followed by 1.9 million in Frankfurt, 1.5 million in Stuttgart, 1.46 million in Hamburg, 1 million in Dortmund and Munich, 500,000 in Nuremberg and Hannover, 471,000 in Leipzig, 350,000 in Gelsenkirchen and 205,000 in Kaiserslautern. Those numbers exceeded all expectations and some of the Host Cities had to expand the Fan Fest areas in the middle of the World Cup. The most popular Fan Fests were located in the inner city areas, making the approach to keep the city centre generally "fan-free" applied by the authorities of Nuremberg ineffective as many football supporters preferred to stay in the picturesque city centre. According to surveys conducted during the 2006 FIFA World Cup at the Berlin, Frankfurt and Munich Fan Fests, 28% of visitors travelled over 100 kilometres to attend the event and up to 84% came there together with friends. Around 21% of foreigners interviewed at Fan Fests visited Germany to see the World Cup without tickets to any match. Media coverage of events had an additional positive effect as pictures of fans celebrating in front of giant screens attracted even more visitors from neighbouring European countries who had spontaneously decided to take part in the celebrations at Fan Fests.

Despite minor inconsistencies in planning and execution, the Fan Fest concept was so successful in fact, numerous people later claimed personal responsibility for the invention. The visitors' expectations regarding Fan Fests were fulfilled. During the World Cup, Fan Fests served as modern market squares where communication and interaction strengthen the feeling of community. Out-of-home media reception made the emotional aspect of escape from everyday life more intense for participants. Pictures of football supporters celebrating in front of video walls became a typical illustration of atmosphere in the country, while "Fanmeile" was later picked up as the German Word of the Year. In 2007, FIFA and the 12 host cities received the German Marketing Prize for Sports for the innovative nature and marketing concept of Fan Fests. FIFA and the Host Cities succeeded in creating and comfortable environment for foreign fans as 95% of them surveyed at Fan Fests agreed that it was an unequivocal declaration of international nature of World Cup and not a mere event for Germans. A thought-out implementation of public viewing at such a large-scale football event as the 2006 World Cup became set a precedent. Immediately after the World Cup, FIFA announced that it registered the trademark for Fan Fests, taking over the organisation and marketing and making Fan Fests an integral part of future World Cups.

=== Locations ===
- Berlin — Straße des 17. Juni (between Brandenburg Gate and Victory Column)
- Cologne — Heumarkt, Roncalliplatz, Rheinauhafen and Deutzer shipyard
- Frankfurt — MainArena (at banks of Main river)
- Stuttgart — Schlossplatz
- Hamburg — Heiligengeistfeld
- Dortmund — Friedensplatz
- Munich — Olympiapark
- Nuremberg — Volksfestplatz
- Hannover — Waterlooplatz
- Leipzig — Augustusplatz
- Gelsenkirchen — Glückauf-Kampfbahn
- Kaiserslautern — Stiftsplatz, Barbarossastrasse

== Marketing ==
=== Broadcasting ===
FIFA, through several companies, sold the rights for the broadcast of 2006 FIFA World Cup to the following broadcasters.

=== Broadcasting rights ===
Broadcasters that were confirmed to be screening some or all of the matches in standard definition are in bold. Broadcasters screening matches in UHF were free-to-air. This was the first FIFA World Cup to be entirely filmed in high-definition, with more regions broadcasting in the widescreen standard.

Country	Broadcaster(s)	Ref
**Arab world**	ART	
**Albania**	DigitAlb	
**Argentina**	Telefe, El Trece, El Nueve, América TV, TyC Sports & DirecTV	
**Armenia**	ARMTV	
**Australia**	SBS	
**Austria**	ORF	
**Azerbaijan**	Lider TV	
**Bangladesh**	BTV	
**Belgium**	Dutch: VRT & KANALTWEE	
**Belgium**	French: RTBF	
**Bhutan**	ESPN STAR Sports	
**Bolivia**	Unitel	
**Bosnia and Herzegovina**	BHRT	
**Brazil**	HDTV: Cable/Satellite (Pay): BandSports & SporTV	
**Brazil**	SDTV: Free-to-air: Rede Globo; Cable/Satellite (Pay): ESPN Brasil	
**Brunei**	Satellite (pay): Kristal-Astro (8-live digital satellite channels dedicated exclusively to the 2006 FIFA World Cup)	
**Bulgaria**	BNT	
**Canada**	English: CTV, Rogers Sportsnet & TSN	
**Canada**	French: SRC	
**Canada**	**Portuguese** & Italian: Omni 1	
**Canada**	**Cantonese** & Chinese: Omni 2	
**Chile**	Megavisión, TVN, RED Televisión & DirecTV	
**China**	CCTV (64-matches including: 56-matches live on CCTV-5, 4-matches live on CCTV-7 & 4-matches on CCTV-1)	
**Colombia**	Caracol, RCN & DirecTV (all matches)	
**Costa Rica**	Repretel	
**Cuba**	Tele Rebelde	
**Croatia**	HRT	
**Cyprus**	RIK	
**Czech Republic**	Czech Television	
**Denmark**	DR1 & TV 2	
**Ecuador**	Teleamazonas, RTS & Ecuavisa	
**Estonia**	ETV	
**Finland**	YLE	
**France**	TF1, M6, Canal+, Eurosport France	
**Georgia**	GPB	
**Germany**	HD:Premiere HD; SD:ARD, ZDF, RTL & Premiere	
**Greece**	ERT1 & NET	
**Guatemala**	Canal 3 & Canal 7	
**Honduras**	TVC	
**Hong Kong**	Free-to-air: ATV & TVB (4-matches including: 1-opening matches, 2-semi finals & 1-finals); Cable (pay): **Cable TV Hong Kong** (all matches)	
**Hungary**	RTL Klub & Sport Klub	
**Iceland**	Sýn	
**India**	Free-to-air: Doordarshan; Satellite (pay): ESPN STAR Sports	
**Indonesia**	SCTV (64 matches includes 56 live telecast and 8 taped group stage matches)	
**Iran**	IRIB	
**Ireland**	RTÉ	
**Israel**	Free-to-air: Channel 2 (Reshet), Channel 10; Satellite/Cable (pay): Sport 5, Sport 1 and Sport 2	
**Italy**	Free-to-air: RAI (1-matches per day); Satellite (pay): Sky Sport (all matches)	
**Japan**	Free-to-air: Fuji TV	
**Kenya**	KTN & KBC	
**North Korea**	KBS (KBS 1TV), MBC & SBS	
**South Korea**	KBS (KBS 1TV), MBC & SBS	
**Latvia**	LTV7 & Channel 1	
**Lithuania**	LRT	
**Macedonia**	MKTV	
**Malaysia**	Free-to-air: Radio Televisyen Malaysia (RTM1 & RTM2) & NTV7; Satellite (pay): Astro (8-live digital satellite channels dedicated exclusively to the 2006 FIFA World Cup)	
**Malta**	Melita Sports	
**Mexico**	Free-to-air: TV Azteca & Televisa; Cable (pay): Mega Cable and Cablevisión; Satellite (pay): SKY México	
**Moldova**	TRM	
**Montenegro**	TV In	
**Netherlands**	NOS	
**New Zealand**	TV1 & Sky	
**Norway**	NRK & TV2	
**Pakistan**	PTV	
**Panama**	Channel 4	
**Paraguay**	SNT	
**Peru**	ATV (Channel 9)	
**Philippines**	RPN, SportsPlus	
**Poland**	Polsat and TVP	
**Portugal**	RTP, SIC, Sport TV	
**Puerto Rico**	Univision Puerto Rico, ABC & ESPN	
**Romania**	RTV	
**Russia**	Perviy Kanal & VGTRK	
**Middle East and North Africa**	ART & (Al Riyadiah, only ln Saudi Arabia)	
**Serbia**	PTC, RTK	
**Singapore**	Free-to-air: MediaCorp TV Channel 5 (4-matches including: 1-opening matches, 2-semi finals & 1-finals); Cable (pay): StarHub Cable Television (all matches)	
**Slovakia**	STV	
**Slovenia**	RTV & Kanal A	
**South Africa**	Free-to-air: SABC; Satellite (pay): Super Sport	
**Spain**	la Sexta, Cuatro TV and Digital+	
**Sweden**	SVT & TV4	
**Switzerland**	German: SF2	
**Switzerland**	French: TSR2	
**Switzerland**	Italian: TSI2	
**Taiwan**	Era Television (3-cable channels for coverage)	
**Thailand**	Free-to-air: Channel 3, Channel 5, Channel 7, Channel 9, Channel 11 & ITV (all matches available on non-subscription television)	
Trinidad and Tobago:	CCN TV6	
**Turkey**	Kanal 1	
**Ukraine**	Inter & ICTV	
**United Kingdom** and territories: England; Scotland; Northern Ireland; Wales	HD: BBC HD & ITV HD	
**United Kingdom** and territories: England; Scotland; Northern Ireland; Wales	SD: BBC & ITV	
**United States** and territories: American Samoa; Guam; Northern Mariana Islands; Puerto Rico; U.S. Virgin Islands	English: ABC, ESPN & ESPN2	
**United States** and territories: American Samoa; Guam; Northern Mariana Islands; Puerto Rico; U.S. Virgin Islands	Spanish: Univision & TeleFutura	
**United States** and territories: American Samoa; Guam; Northern Mariana Islands; Puerto Rico; U.S. Virgin Islands	German: Setanta Sports	
**United States** and territories: American Samoa; Guam; Northern Mariana Islands; Puerto Rico; U.S. Virgin Islands	French: TV5Monde	
**United States** and territories: American Samoa; Guam; Northern Mariana Islands; Puerto Rico; U.S. Virgin Islands	Portuguese: RBTI & Rede Globo	
**United States** and territories: American Samoa; Guam; Northern Mariana Islands; Puerto Rico; U.S. Virgin Islands	Persian: Tapesh TV	
**United States** and territories: American Samoa; Guam; Northern Mariana Islands; Puerto Rico; U.S. Virgin Islands	Arabic: ART	
**United States** and territories: American Samoa; Guam; Northern Mariana Islands; Puerto Rico; U.S. Virgin Islands	Japanese: TV Japan	
**United States** and territories: American Samoa; Guam; Northern Mariana Islands; Puerto Rico; U.S. Virgin Islands	Korean: KBS	
**Uruguay**	Teledoce, Monte Carlo TV, Canal 10, DirecTV	
**Venezuela**	Venevisión, RCTV, Meridiano Televisión & DirecTV	
**Vietnam**	FPT, VTV, HTV & VTC	

=== Sponsorship ===
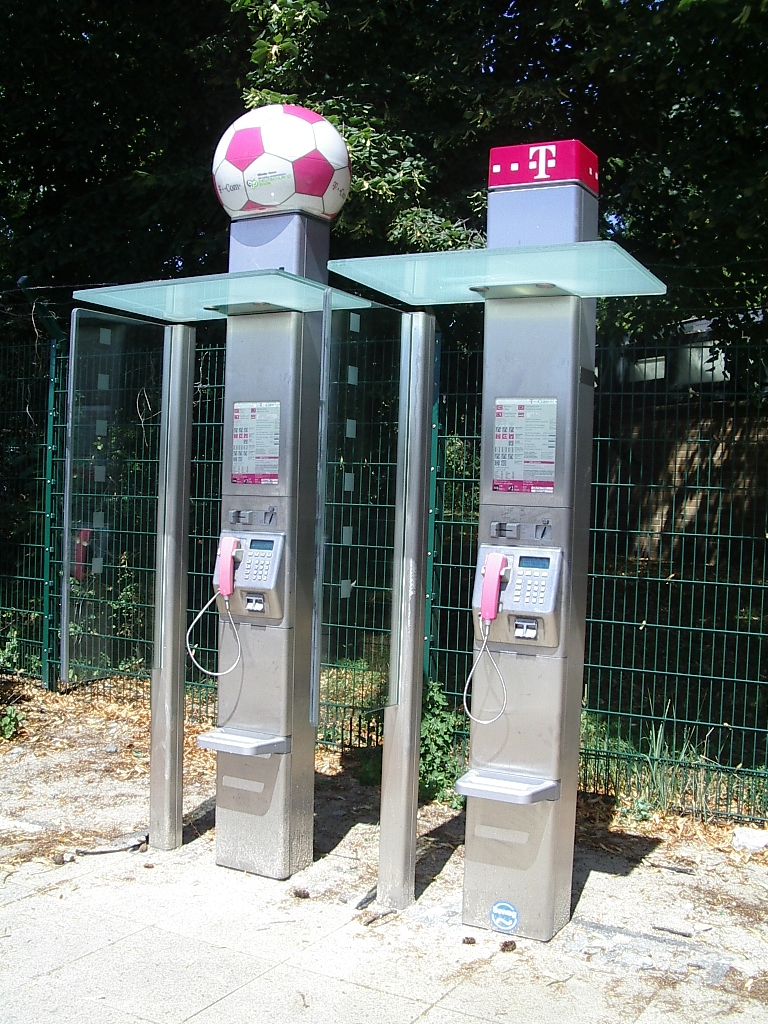
Deutsche Telekom was one of the sponsors of FIFA World Cup 2006.

The sponsors of the 2006 World Cup consisted of 15 FIFA Partners.

FIFA partners	FIFA partners	FIFA partners
Adidas; Avaya; Budweiser; Coca-Cola; Continental	Deutsche Telekom; Emirates; Fujifilm; Gillette; Hyundai	MasterCard; McDonald's; Philips; Toshiba; Yahoo

== Symbols ==
=== Mascot ===
The official mascot of this World Cup was "Goleo VI"

=== Match ball ===
The official match ball was "Teamgeist", manufactured by Adidas.

=== Music ===
The official song was "The Time of Our Lives". The official anthem was "Zeit dass sich was dreht (Celebrate The Day)".

== Evaluation of Germany as host nation ==
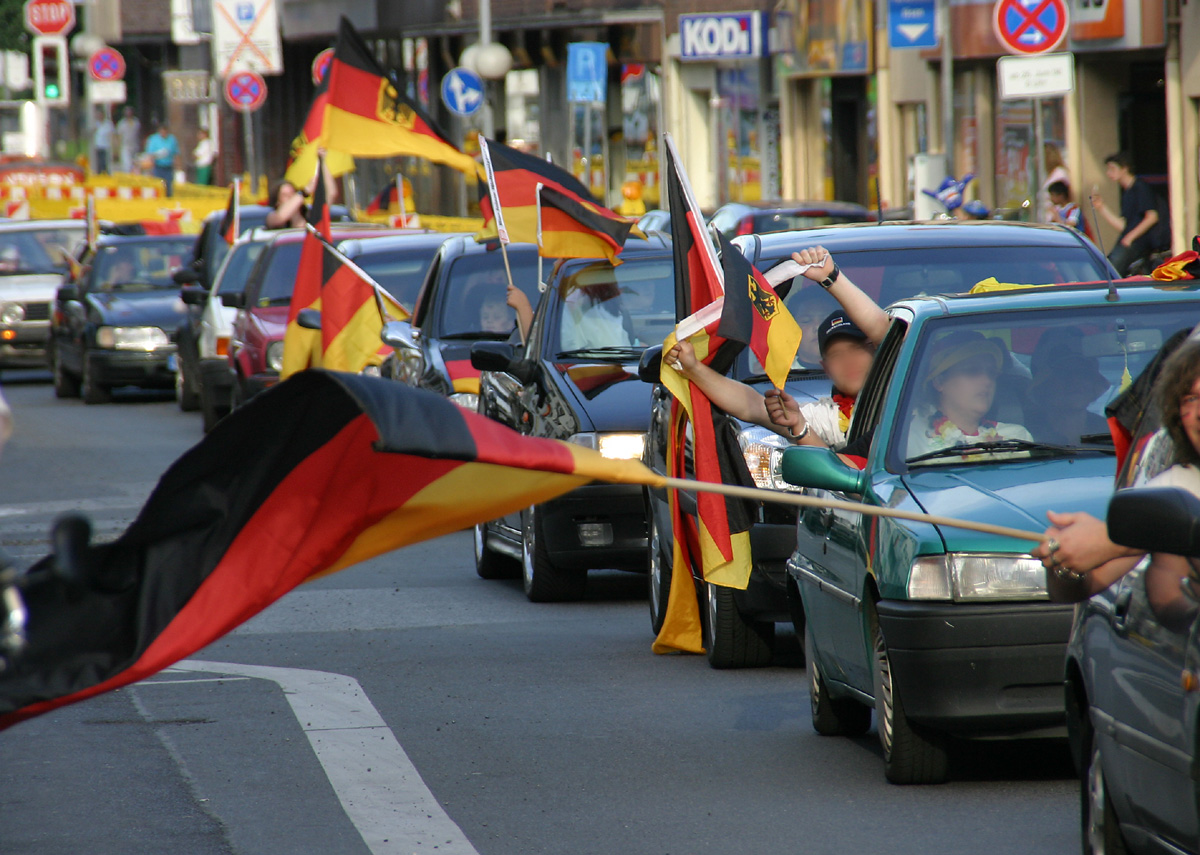
Fans in celebratory motorcade

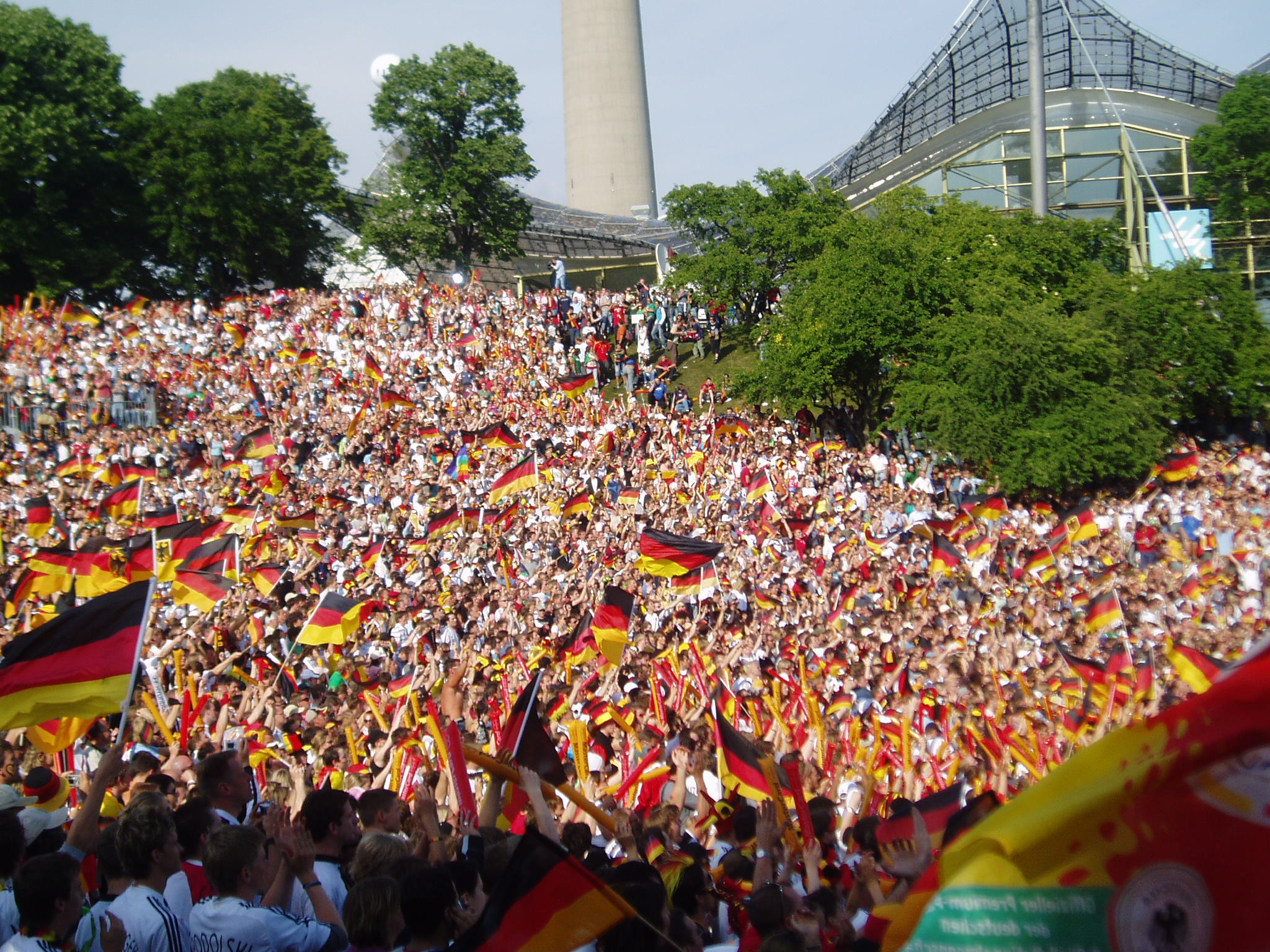
Celebrating fans in Olympiapark in Munich during the opening match between Germany and Costa Rica

FIFA president Sepp Blatter stated the organization of the tournament was the best in history and that Germany had a welcoming public. Through the many fanfests and large-screen broadcasts the feeling of a four-week national festival developed, in which much of the population took part. During the first weeks of the tournament, there was concerned discussion about the wide display of the German national flag and the German national colours on houses, vehicles and clothing. Numerous national and international observers from media, society and politics considered that this signified not only great support for the German football team, but even a "new patriotism". This continued a development already observed during the 2002 FIFA World Cup. A study by the University of Marburg suggested a slight rise in national pride. However, sporadic attempts of far right organisations to use the tournament as a platform for their propaganda remained unsuccessful.

As the German national football team contributed to arousing this previously undeclared enthusiasm and euphoria in Germany over a period of weeks, the then German President Horst Köhler presented the national players on 14 August 2006 with the Silbernes Lorbeerblatt (Silver Laurel Leaf), the highest sports award in Germany. The team's trainer, Jürgen Klinsmann, in February 2007 was furthermore awarded the Bundesverdienstkreuz, not least for his reformed methods of modern training and playing methods, in which he persevered despite harsh criticism. Nevertheless, Klinsmann announced after the tournament that he would not extend his contract as trainer of the national team, since he felt completely burned-out and wished to spend more time with his family in California. The German Football Association (DFB) on the same day named as Klinsmann's successor his assistant trainer Joachim Löw, since in the opinion of the DFB leadership he would best continue Klinsmann's work and training methods. According to a representative survey taken in Trier by the European Tourism Institute (ETI), 96% of the German population considered that Germany was a good host during the World Cup. Additionally 93% of those interviewed found the international football fans to be agreeable.

== See also ==
- 2006 FIFA World Cup:
  - Broadcasting rights
  - Controversies
  - Disciplinary record
  - FIFA World Cup records
  - Officials
  - Organizing Committee
  - Qualification
  - Seeding
  - Sponsorship
  - Squads
- 2006 FIFA World Cup Organizing Committee
- 2011 FIFA Women's World Cup, also held in Germany
- Adidas Teamgeist
- Colpo grosso a Berlino
- Deutschland. Ein Sommermärchen, a 2006 documentary film recording the Germany national team from boot camp in Sardegna to match for third place against Portugal
- Leeuwenhosen controversy
- Several countries celebrated this major event with the minting of specially high value commemorative coins. Among them is the Belgian 20 euro Germany 2006 FIFA World Cup Coin. The obverse of the coin shows a footballer with a ball, right above them '2006 FIFA World Cup Germany' can be clearly seen.
- Strangers, a 2007 film which takes place during the 2006 World Cup
- Voices from the FIFA World Cup
