= Matthias Keller =

Matthias Keller may refer to:

- Matthias Keller (footballer)
- Matthias Keller (musician)
