= Colpo grosso a Berlino =

2016 Italian football documentary

- Directed by: Marco Franzelli; Donatella Scarnati
- Production company: RAI
- Distributed by: Rai 2
- Release date: 8 June 2016
- Running time: 80 min
- Country: Italy
- Language: Italian

Colpo grosso a Berlino is an Italian documentary about Gli Azzurri's route to victory in the 2006 FIFA World Cup. It consists in interviews to some of the players, such as Fabio Cannavaro and Fabio Grosso as well as the manager Marcello Lippi, alternate to clips of goals and highlights of the matches and celebrations.

== Plot ==
Italian football had been shocked by the Calciopoli scandal few weeks before the beginning of the World Cup, however, the Azzurri managed to get easily way past the group stage. In the round of 16, Italy met Australia, the match was drawn until Fabio Grosso won a last minute penalty which was converted by Francesco Totti. In the quarter-finals Italy easily got past Ukraine (3–0) returning to a World Cup semifinal for the first time since 1994, when they lost the final to Brazil. In the semi-finals Italy faced host nation Germany, in the Signal Iduna Park, where the hosts were historically unbeaten. However, Italy dominated the match, and won it in extra time thanks to 2 last-minute goals by Fabio Grosso and Alessandro Del Piero. In the final Italy faced France, whom they had lost to in the UEFA Euro 2000 Final. France took the lead after 7 minutes after Zinedine Zidane converted a controversially awarded penalty, Italy equalised in the 19th with a header by Marco Materazzi on a corner and regular and extra time ended in draw, so the match required a penalty shootout to declare a winner. The Italian manager Marcello Lippi, in the reported interview, declares that he decided that Fabio Grosso should have taken the last penalty as he had been several times decisive in the last minutes (against Australia and Germany especially). From the 11-meter spot, David Trezeguet of France hit the crossbar, whilst all the Italians scored, including Fabio Grosso, whose goal gave to Italy their fourth FIFA World Cup title. The documentary ends with Italy's captain Fabio Cannavaro being handed and lifting the trophy, followed by the return of the team in Italy and celebrations in Rome

== In TV ==
The documentary was published on Rai 2 in June 2016, around the tenth anniversary of Italy's World Cup victory and also to introduce to the 2016 Euros in which Italy was competing.
