= 2006 FIFA World Cup sponsorship =

Corporate sponsorship during the 2006 World Cup has been a major source of revenue for FIFA, but it has also led to criticism for overly commercializing the event and allocating too many game tickets to sponsors, as well as for prohibitive actions against non-sponsor advertising around the stadiums. FIFA has defended its policies by pointing out that all of its profits from the World Cup are invested back into worldwide football.

== Examples of sponsorship ==
As sporting events have become increasingly commercialized, a wide variety of sponsorship opportunities have emerged - or been created - and the 2006 FIFA World Cup was no different. Hyundai supplied team buses for each of the thirty-two finalists, and held a contest to decide the team bus slogans. Adidas supplied fifteen personalized match balls for every match of the tournament. Each Teamgeist ball has the name of the stadium, the national teams, the date of the match and the kickoff time are printed. The balls used for the final match were gold, rather than the normal white. Casio acted as the official timekeeper and provided giant countdown clocks in 8 cities across Germany to promote the oncoming tournament.

The tournament itself also had a myriad of 'official' items including an official video game (2006 FIFA World Cup) and song ("The Time of Our Lives", sung by Il Divo and Toni Braxton).

The fifteen official partners of the 2006 World Cup were: Adidas, Budweiser, Avaya, Coca-Cola, Continental, Deutsche Telekom, Emirates, Fujifilm, Gillette, Hyundai, Mastercard, McDonald's, Philips, Toshiba, and Yahoo!.

As companies who are not sponsors are not allowed to have their names overly associated with the World Cup, FIFA temporarily renamed seven of the twelve stadiums to "FIFA World Cup Stadium, [Name of City]."

== Revenue ==
FIFA raised €1.9bn in marketing revenue and €700m from sponsorship from the [[|2006 World Cup]]. The 2006 FIFA World Cup has fifteen "official partners", each thought to have paid €40 million for the privilege. It has a further six "National Partners," who paid €13m each for local advertising rights.

== Sponsor controversies ==
There has been some controversy about several of FIFA's sponsors. FIFA has been criticized for taking on McDonald's as a sponsor because many feel the chain's unhealthy food should not be connected to a sporting event. Budweiser also has endured criticism for being the official beer of the World Cup in a country where, because it contains rice and fails the German Reinheitsgebot, it cannot be sold as a beer. Because of a longstanding copyright dispute with Czech brewery Budweiser Budvar it can also not be sold under the name of Budweiser in Germany. Anheuser-Busch signed its sponsorship deal with FIFA before the 2006 World Cup's host country was chosen, and opted to advertise the brand as Bud 百威, combining the first three letters of its English brand name with its Chinese brand name. Budweiser is the only sponsor with non English writing on its billboards.

During the first round match between the Netherlands and Ivory Coast, over 1,000 Dutch fans who arrived at the stadium wearing orange lederhosen were forced to remove their trousers because the lederhosen had the logo of Dutch brewery Bavaria. Bavaria, who had sold the lederhosen as part of an offer, was accused by FIFA of ambush marketing at the expense of American beer maker Budweiser who had paid millions of Euro to sponsor the competition and for the title of "Official Beer of the 2006 World Cup."

In April 2007, Mastercard sued FIFA for reneging on a World Cup credit card sponsorship deal after it had awarded the sponsorship to Visa. Mastercard had the right of first refusal to sponsor the 2010 and 2014 World Cups but was not given the opportunity to do so. On December 7, 2006, Mastercard won its US federal lawsuit against FIFA. The judge issued a ruling stating that FIFA had breached the contract and that Mastercard was entitled to sponsor the next two World Cups. The judge also brought to light that FIFA officials had repeatedly lied to both Mastercard and Visa during the negotiations.

=== Ticket availability ===
FIFA allocated approximately one in six of the 3.1 million World Cup tickets to its sponsors. Each of the fifteen official partners received 25,000 World Cup tickets, while the six national partners split a total of 115,000. This has led to FIFA being heavily criticized for not making enough tickets available to fans.
