= 2006 FIFA World Cup seeding =

Calculation of football teams before tournament

The draw for the 2006 FIFA World Cup took place on 9 December 2005 in Leipzig, Germany. The ceremony was hosted by German supermodel Heidi Klum and German television presenter Reinhold Beckmann. The draw itself was conducted by former footballers Pelé, Lothar Matthäus, Johan Cruyff, Roger Milla, Christian Karembeu, Masashi Nakayama, Cobi Jones, and Lucas Radebe.

To calculate the seeding for the 2006 FIFA World Cup, FIFA used the FIFA World Rankings in combination with performances of national teams in the two previous World Cups.

Points were allocated on the basis of 32 for the best achieving of the 32 qualifiers for 2006 FIFA World Cup in each of the five fields considered, down to one for the lowest ranking.

The seedings table uses these points obtained from the 1998 FIFA World Cup and the 2002 FIFA World Cup averaged in a 1:2 ratio respectively, added to the average number of points derived from the World Rankings at three given dates (at ratio 1:1:1), December 2003, December 2004, and November 2005. This generates a view of how well the teams have performed over the last ten years (since the rankings in 2003 include results from eight years prior to that) with a specific focus on how the teams have performed in the FIFA World Cup on previous occasions. Significant differences between this ranking of the teams and the official FIFA rankings at the time of the draw can be seen for Czech Republic, Germany and South Korea (ρ=0.87).

Seed	Country	1. FIFA World Cup Finals					2. FIFA World Rankings							Total Points
Seed	Country	France 1998 (33.3%)		Korea Japan 2002 (66.7%)		Avg. Points	Dec 2003 (33.3%)		Dec 2004 (33.3%)		Nov 2005 (33.3%)		Avg. Points	Total Points
Seed	Country	Rk	Pt.	Rk	Pt.	Avg. Points	Rk	Pt.	Rk	Pt.	Rk	Pt.	Avg. Points	Total Points
1	Brazil	2	31	1	32	31.7	1	32	1	32	1	32	32.0	63.7
2	England	9	24	6	27	26.0	8	25	8	25	9	24	24.7	50.7
3	Spain	17	9	5	28	21.7	3	30	5	28	6	27	28.3	50.0
4	Germany	7	26	2	31	29.3	12	22	19	19	16	19	20.0	49.3
5	Mexico	13	20	11	22	21.3	7	26	7	26	7	26	26.0	47.3
6	France	1	32	28	8	16.0	2	31	2	31	5	28	30.0	46.0
7	Italy	5	28	15	18	21.3	10	24	10	23	12	22	23.0	44.3
8	Argentina	6	27	18	9	15.0	5	28	3	30	4	29	29.0	44.0
9	United States	32	8	8	25	19.3	11	23	11	22	8	25	23.3	42.7
10	Netherlands	4	29	-	0	9.7	4	29	6	27	3	30	28.7	38.3
11	South Korea	30	8	4	29	22.0	22	16	22	17	29	13	15.3	37.3
12	Japan	31	8	9	24	18.7	29	12	17	20	15	20	17.3	36.0
13	Sweden	-	0	13	20	13.3	19	19	13	21	14	21	20.3	33.7
14	Croatia	3	30	23	9	16.0	20	18	23	16	20	17	17.0	33.0
15	Paraguay	14	19	16	17	17.7	22	17	30	12	30	12	13.7	31.3
16	Czech Republic	-	0	-	0	0.0	6	27	4	29	2	31	29.0	29.0
17	Portugal	-	0	21	9	6.0	17	21	9	24	10	23	22.7	28.7
18	Costa Rica	-	0	19	9	6.0	17	20	27	14	21	16	16.7	22.7
19	Saudi Arabia	28	8	32	8	8.0	26	14	28	13	32	11	12.7	20.7
20	Poland	-	0	25	8	5.3	25	15	25	15	23	15	15.0	20.3
21	Iran	20	9	-	0	3.0	28	13	20	18	19	18	16.3	19.3
22	Tunisia	26	8	29	8	8.0	45	8	35	11	28	14	11.0	19.0
23	Ecuador	-	0	24	9	6.0	37	11	39	10	37	9	10.0	16.0
24	Serbia and Montenegro	10	23	-	0	7.7	41	10	46	8	47	6	8.0	15.7
25	Switzerland	-	0	-	0	0.0	44	9	51	7	36	10	8.7	8.7
26	Ukraine	-	0	-	0	0.0	60	7	57	6	40	8	7.0	7.0
27	Ivory Coast	-	0	-	0	0.0	70	5	40	9	41	7	7.0	7.0
28	Australia	-	0	-	0	0.0	82	3	58	5	49	5	4.3	4.3
29	Trinidad and Tobago	-	0	-	0	0.0	70	6	63	4	51	3	4.3	4.3
30	Ghana	-	0	-	0	0.0	78	4	77	2	50	4	3.3	3.3
31	Angola	-	0	-	0	0.0	83	2	72	3	62	1	2.0	2.0
32	Togo	-	0	-	0	0.0	94	1	89	1	56	2	1.3	1.3
Seed	Country	Rk	Pt.	Rk	Pt.	Avg. Points	Rk	Pt.	Rk	Pt.	Rk	Pt.	Avg. Points	Total Points
Seed	Country	France 1998 (33.3%)		Korea Japan 2002 (66.7%)		Avg. Points	Dec 2003 (33.3%)		Dec 2004 (33.3%)		Nov 2005 (33.3%)		Avg. Points	Total Points
Seed	Country	1. FIFA World Cup Finals					2. FIFA World Rankings							Total Points

== System change ==
Unlike the 2002 FIFA World Cup seeding system which used performances of national teams in the three previous World Cups, this seeding system only used the last two. Had Denmark not failed to qualify, they would have been seeded at the expense of Argentina.

== Progress of seeded teams ==
All 8 seeded teams qualified for the knockout stages of the tournament, but France and Mexico failed to win their groups, and so had to play other seeded teams in the second round. Mexico lost to Argentina, and France beat Spain, so while Spain and Mexico were eliminated earlier than the seedings would have predicted, Ukraine and Portugal went further than the seedings predicted, Portugal going on to reach the semi-finals.

== Criticisms ==
- The formula was disregarded in deciding which European team should go in the special pot for the draw (necessary to avoid three UEFA teams in one group). Serbia and Montenegro were picked purely because they were the lowest in the FIFA World Rankings at the time of the draw, despite the World Cup seeding formula placing Ukraine and Switzerland lower.
- Some controversy arose when the Netherlands were left unseeded, leading some to believe that the ranking system overly penalises teams that miss out on qualification for previous World Cups.
- Each monthly FIFA World Ranking at that time included eight years' worth of matches, so by combining the three rankings (December 2003, December 2004, and November 2005), the seeding was most heavily impacted by matches occurring in 2003.
