= German National Tourist Board =

Tourism in Germany

- Company type: Eingetragener Verein
- Industry: Tourism
- Founded: 1948
- Headquarters: Frankfurt am Main, Germany
- Key people: Petra Hedorfer; Chief Executive Officer; Reinhard Werner; Commercial Director
- Number of employees: 150 (2017)
- Website: germany.travel

The German National Tourist Board (abbreviation: GNTB, German: Deutsche Zentrale für Tourismus e.V., DZT) is a national marketing organisation which has worked with the Federal Government of Germany to promote tourism in and to Germany. It represents Germany throughout the world as a destination for holidays, business travel and visits to friends and family.

The GNTB is an eingetragener Verein which was founded in 1948. The head office is situated in Frankfurt am Main, Germany. The marketing organisation is mainly financed by the German National Ministry of Economy & Technology.

Since 1999, the German National Tourist Board has also been responsible for the marketing of domestic tourism from one region to another. Its strategic goal is the responsible marketing of inter-regional Vacation Themes in Germany.

The GNTB works in close cooperation and economic partnership with all levels of the tourism industry in Germany.

== Offices / agencies ==
Marketing is split into six regional management areas:

- North West Europe
- South West Europe
- North East Europe
- South East Europe
- America/Israel
- Asia/Australia

each with its own foreign representative offices and sales and marketing agencies. Countries without their own representation are covered by the appropriate regional management team.

The GNTB is present around the world with 31 foreign representative offices and sales agencies. Apart from the GNTB's 12 own representative offices, the sales network abroad also encompasses marketing agencies with partners such as Deutsche Lufthansa AG and the Federation of German Chambers of Industry and Commerce (DIHK).

== Marketing themes ==
Rigorous analysis and assessment of the markets form the basis of the GNTB's sales and marketing activities. In line with the international culture and health mega-trends, the GNTB developed its two major product lines: City Tours/Events and Hearth & Fitness Holidays, which it uses to derive key campaigns, long-term product segments and basic information and to devise themes for its international marketing activities.

- Annual Theme for 2017: Luther 2017
- Annual Theme for 2018: Culinary Germany
- Annual Theme for 2019: 100 years of Bauhaus
- Annual Theme for 2020: 250th anniversary of the birth of Beethoven

== Publicity ==
- Wilkommen in Deutschland; Weltausstellung EXPO 2000 Hannover / Welcome to Germany; World Exhibition EXPO 2000 Hannover. PAL videotape, 15 min.
