= Matthias Keller (musician) =

German composer

Matthias Keller (born 1956 in Bremen) is a German composer, music critic, organist, conductor, and radio producer. For many years he has been a juror for the Preis der deutschen Schallplattenkritik. He has been commissioned to compose or arrange works for the Berlin Radio Symphony Orchestra, the Capella Istropolitana, the Dallas Chamber Orchestra, the Munich Symphony Orchestra, the Nordwestdeutsche Philharmonie, and the Polish Chamber Philharmonic among others. He composed the music for the closing ceremonies of the 2006 FIFA World Cup performed simultaneously by the Munich Philharmonic Orchestra, the Bavarian State Orchestra and the Bavarian Radio Orchestra with conductors Christian Thielemann, Zubin Mehta, and Mariss Jansons, and soloists Diana Damrau, Plácido Domingo and Lang Lang.

Keller received his musical education at the Osnabrück Conservatory and at the Hochschule für Musik und Theater München where his chief areas of interest were the organ, music education, and church music. In 1974 he released his first solo album as an organist. He has also made several recordings with flutist Ulrich Herkenhoff on the Thorofon, Koch/Universal, and Oehms Classics labels. He has worked actively as a church organist and choirmaster throughout his career.

As a writer, Keller has written musical criticism for Fono Forum, Klassik Heute, Opernwelt, "DU", and Süddeutsche Zeitung among other publications. Since 2004 he has served as the editor/producer of Bayern 4 Klassik. He is the author of the music encyclopedia Komponisten der Gegenwart and several books related to film score composition and film score composers. He has worked extensively as a writer and producer for various radio stations in Germany, including Bayerischer Rundfunk and Hessischer Rundfunk.
