= 2000–01 Primera División A season =

Season of a Mexican football league

Primera División A
- Season: 2000–2001
- Champions: Invierno: Gallos de Aguascalientes (1st Title); Verano: Reboceros de La Piedad (1st title)
- Promoted: Reboceros de La Piedad
- Relegated: Halcones de Querétaro
- Top goalscorer: Invierno: Cristhian Patiño (16); Verano: Héctor Giménez (16)

Primera División A (Méxican First A Division) is a Mexican football tournament. This season was composed of Invieno 2000 and Verano 2001. Reboceros de La Piedad was the winner of the promotion to First Division after winning Gallos de Aguascalientes in the promotion playoff.

== Changes for the 2000–01 season ==
- The Jaguares de Colima spot in Primera 'A' was bought by Halcones de Querétaro, Halcones remained in the league, Jaguares had dissolved.
- Toros Neza was relegated from Primera Division.
- Potros Marte was promoted from Second Division.

== Stadiums and locations ==
Location of teams in the 2000-2001 Primera División A

Club	Stadium	Capacity	City
Aguascalientes	Municipal de Aguascalientes	12,500	Aguascalientes, Aguascalientes
Ángeles / Real San Sebastián	Cuauhtémoc	42,648	Puebla, Puebla
Atlético Mexiquense	Nemesio Díez	35,000	Toluca, State of Mexico
Bachilleres	Jalisco	60,000	Guadalajara, Jalisco
Cruz Azul Hidalgo	10 de Diciembre	17,000	Cruz Azul, Hidalgo
Correcaminos UAT	Marte R. Gómez	20,000	Ciudad Victoria, Tamaulipas
Durango	Francisco Zarco	15,000	Durango, Durango
Halcones de Querétaro	Corregidora	35,000	Querétaro, Querétaro
La Piedad	Juan N. López	15,000	La Piedad, Michoacán
Lobos UAP	Ignacio Zaragoza	22,000	Puebla, Puebla
Nacional Tijuana	Cerro Colorado	12,000	Tijuana, Baja California
Potros Marte	Centenario	14,500	Cuernavaca, Morelos
Real San Luis	Plan de San Luis	18,000	San Luis Potosí, S.L.P.
RS Zacatecas	Francisco Villa	18,000	Zacatecas, Zacatecas
Saltillo	Francisco I. Madero	10,000	Saltillo, Coahuila
Tigres de Ciudad Juárez	Olímpico Benito Juárez	22,000	Ciudad Juárez, Chihuahua
Toros Neza	Neza 86	20,000	Ciudad Nezahualcóyotl, State of Mexico
Veracruz	Luis "Pirata" Fuente	33,000	Veracruz, Veracruz
Yucatán	Carlos Iturralde	24,000	Mérida, Yucatán
Zacatepec	Agustín Coruco Díaz	18,000	Zacatepec, Morelos

== Invierno 2000 ==
=== Group league tables ===
==== Group 1 ====
Pos	Team	Pld	W	D	L	GF	GA	GD	Pts
1	Veracruz	19	10	7	2	35	24	+11	37
2	Toros Neza	19	8	8	3	31	21	+10	32
3	Bachilleres	19	8	5	6	36	28	+8	29
4	Halcones	19	4	4	11	14	27	−13	16
5	Atlético Mexiquense	19	4	3	12	18	32	−14	15

Source: Ascenso MX
Rules for classification: 1st points; 2nd goal difference; 3rd goals scored; 4th head-to-head; 5th away goals scored; 6th draw

==== Group 2 ====
Pos	Team	Pld	W	D	L	GF	GA	GD	Pts
1	La Piedad	19	13	3	3	41	18	+23	42
2	RS Zacatecas	19	11	4	4	29	22	+7	37
3	Nacional Tijuana	19	8	6	5	26	19	+7	30
4	Saltillo	19	7	6	6	27	26	+1	27
5	Real San Luis	19	5	6	8	23	27	−4	21

Source: Ascenso MX
Rules for classification: 1st points; 2nd goal difference; 3rd goals scored; 4th head-to-head; 5th away goals scored; 6th draw

==== Group 3 ====
Pos	Team	Pld	W	D	L	GF	GA	GD	Pts
1	Aguascalientes	19	9	4	6	35	27	+8	31
2	Yucatán	19	8	7	4	29	24	+5	31
3	Tigres Ciudad Juárez	19	7	2	10	31	37	−6	23
4	Correcaminos UAT	19	6	3	10	30	36	−6	21
5	Ángeles	19	3	1	15	20	41	−21	10

Source: Ascenso MX
Rules for classification: 1st points; 2nd goal difference; 3rd goals scored; 4th head-to-head; 5th away goals scored; 6th draw

==== Group 4 ====
Pos	Team	Pld	W	D	L	GF	GA	GD	Pts
1	Potros Marte	19	10	6	3	46	22	+24	36
2	Cruz Azul Hidalgo	19	6	6	7	22	27	−5	24
3	Zacatepec	19	4	8	7	32	32	0	20
4	Lobos UAP	19	4	7	8	20	28	−8	19
5	Durango	19	5	4	10	28	44	−16	19

Source: Ascenso MX
Rules for classification: 1st points; 2nd goal difference; 3rd goals scored; 4th head-to-head; 5th away goals scored; 6th draw

=== General league table ===
Pos	Team	Pld	W	D	L	GF	GA	GD	Pts
1	La Piedad	19	13	3	3	41	18	+23	42
2	Veracruz	19	10	7	2	35	24	+11	37
3	RS Zacatecas	19	11	4	4	29	22	+7	37
4	Potros Marte	19	10	6	3	46	22	+24	36
5	Toros Neza	19	8	8	3	31	21	+10	32
6	Aguascalientes	19	9	4	6	35	27	+8	31
7	Yucatán	19	8	7	4	29	24	+5	31
8	Nacional Tijuana	19	8	6	5	26	19	+7	30
9	Bachilleres	19	8	5	6	36	28	+8	29
10	Saltillo	19	7	6	6	27	26	+1	27
11	Cruz Azul Hidalgo	19	6	6	7	22	27	−5	24
12	Tigres Ciudad Juárez	19	7	2	10	31	37	−6	23
13	Real San Luis	19	5	6	8	23	27	−4	21
14	Correcaminos UAT	19	6	3	10	30	36	−6	21
15	Zacatepec	19	4	8	7	32	32	0	20
16	Lobos UAP	19	4	7	8	20	28	−8	19
17	Durango	19	5	4	10	28	44	−16	19
18	Halcones	19	4	4	11	14	27	−13	16
19	Atlético Mexiquense	19	4	3	12	18	32	−14	15
20	Ángeles	19	3	1	15	20	41	−21	10

Source: Ascenso MX
Rules for classification: 1st points; 2nd goal difference; 3rd goals scored; 4th head-to-head; 5th away goals scored; 6th draw

=== Results ===
Home \ Away	AGS	ANG	AMX	BAC	CRH	DUR	HAL	LAP	NAT	PMA	RSL	RSZ	SAL	TGJ	TOR	UAT	UAP	VER	YUC	ZAC
Aguascalientes		4–2		2–2	2–2		1–0		1–2			4–0			3–2		1–0	1–2	1–0	
Ángeles				2–1			3–0	1–2				0–3			1–3	0–1	1–1	1–2	4–2	
At. Mexiquense	1–2	2–1			1–0	2–2				0–2		1–1	4–1	2–1	1–1					
Bachilleres			1–0			1–0		4–1	2–3		1–0			4–1		3–1	4–1		2–2	1–1
Cruz Azul Hidalgo		1–0		1–3			1–0	0–2	0–0			1–3			1–1		3–3	2–1	0–3	
Durango	5–3	3–0			2–2					0–5		0–2	1–2	2–1	3–1			0–0		
Halcones			3–2	0–0		2–1		0–3			0–2					2–1	0–0		0–1	1–1
La Piedad	3–1		2–1			4–0			1–1	3–1	2–1		2–1	3–0		4–0				4–2
Nacional		2–0	1–0			1–2	2–1				2–0	1–2			1–1	2–0		0–1		0–0
Potros Marte	2–1	3–1		2–2	0–2		3–1		2–0			2–2			2–2			3–3	3–1	
Real San Luis	1–3	2–0	1–0		0–1	5–2			0–0				0–0	3–3						2–1
RS Zacatecas				1–0			2–1	1–0			1–1					1–0	1–0	1–2	2–2	1–0
Saltillo	1–1	2–0		3–1	1–1		1–1		1–1	2–2		3–1			0–2			1–0		
Tigres Cd. Juárez	3–2	2–1			1–0		1–2		1–4	2–3		3–2	1–0		1–2			4–0		
Toros Neza				3–1			1–0	1–1			1–1	1–2				3–0	3–1	2–2	2–1	
Correcaminos UAT	0–2		4–0		2–1	5–2				3–2	3–1		2–3	1–1						3–3
Lobos UAP			1–0			4–1		1–3	1–0	0–3	2–0		2–4	0–1		1–1				0–0
Veracruz			2–0	4–0			1–0	1–1			3–3					4–3	1–1		1–1	3–1
Yucatán			1–0			1–1		1–0	3–3		2–0		2–1	2–1		1–0	1–1			2–2
Zacatepec	0–0	5–3	5–1		2–3	3–1				2–3			0–1	4–3	0–0					

Updated to match(es) played on 18 November 2000. Source: Memoria Futbolera (subscription required)
Legend: Blue = home team win; Yellow = draw; Red = away team win.

=== Reclassification series ===
Team 1	Agg.	Team 2	1st leg	2nd leg
Nacional Tijuana	1–3	Cruz Azul Hidalgo	0–3	1–0

==== First leg ====
22 November 2000	Cruz Azul Hidalgo	3–0	Nacional Tijuana	Ciudad Cooperativa, Hidalgo
12:00		Report		Stadium: Estadio 10 de Diciembre

==== Second leg ====
25 November 2000	Nacional Tijuana	1–0 (1–3 agg.)	Cruz Azul Hidalgo	Tijuana
19:30	Deeke 11'	Report		Stadium: Estadio Cerro Colorado

=== Liguilla ===
Quarter-finals
1	La Piedad	1	2	3
8	Cruz Azul Hidalgo	0	0	0
2	Veracruz	0	3	3
7	Yucatán	4	2	6
4	Potros Marte	0	3	3
5	Toros Neza	0	0	0
3	RS Zacatecas	2	0	2
6	Aguascalientes	3	1	4

Semi-finals
1	La Piedad	2	5	7
7	Yucatán	1	0	1
4	Potros Marte	0	3	3
6	Aguascalientes	0	4	4

Final
1	La Piedad	1	3	4
6	Aguascalientes	1	5	6

==== Quarter-finals ====
Team 1	Agg.	Team 2	1st leg	2nd leg
Reboceros de La Piedad	3–0	Cruz Azul Hidalgo	1–0	2–0
Veracruz	3–6	Yucatán	0–4	3–2
RS Zacatecas	2–4	Gallos de Aguascalientes	2–3	0–1
Potros Marte	3–0	Toros Neza	0–0	3–0

===== First leg =====
29 November 2000	Gallos de Aguascalientes	3–2	RS Zacatecas	Aguascalientes, Aguascalientes
15:00		Report		Stadium: Estadio Municipal

29 November 2000	Toros Neza	0–0	Potros Marte	Ciudad Nezahualcóyotl, State of Mexico
15:00		Report		Stadium: Estadio Neza 86

29 November 2000	Yucatán	4–0	Veracruz	Mérida, Yucatán
15:00		Report		Stadium: Estadio Carlos Iturralde

30 November 2000	Cruz Azul Hidalgo	0–1	Reboceros de La Piedad	Ciudad Cooperativa, Hidalgo
12:00		Report	Martínez 31'	Stadium: Estadio 10 de Diciembre

===== Second leg =====
2 December 2000	Veracruz	3–2 (3–6 agg.)	Yucatán	Veracruz, Veracruz
16:00		Report		Stadium: Estadio Luis "Pirata" Fuente

2 December 2000	Potros Marte	3–0 (3–0 agg.)	Toros Neza	Cuernavaca, Morelos
16:00	Mohamed 13', 66'; Paredes 49'	Report		Stadium: Estadio Centenario

2 December 2000	RS Zacatecas	0–1 (2–4 agg.)	Gallos de Aguascalientes	Zacatecas, Zacatecas
19:00		Report		Stadium: Estadio Francisco Villa

3 December 2000	Reboceros de La Piedad	2–0 (3–0 agg.)	Cruz Azul Hidalgo	La Piedad, Michoacán
12:00	Patiño 61'; Fonseca 77'	Report		Stadium: Estadio Juan N. López

==== Semi-finals ====
Team 1	Agg.	Team 2	1st leg	2nd leg
Reboceros de La Piedad	7–1	Yucatán	2–1	5–0
Potros Marte	3–4	Gallos de Aguascalientes	0–0	3–4

===== First leg =====
6 December 2000	Gallos de Aguascalientes	0–0	Potros Marte	Aguascalientes, Aguascalientes
15:00		Report		Stadium: Estadio Municipal; Attendance: 10,000

7 December 2000	Yucatán	1–2	Reboceros de La Piedad	Mérida, Yucatán
20:00	Mendoza 4'	Report	Hernández 29'; Martínez 87'	Stadium: Estadio Carlos Iturralde; Attendance: 16,000

===== Second leg =====
9 December 2000	Potros Marte	3–4 (3–4 agg.)	Gallos de Aguascalientes	Cuernavaca, Morelos
16:00	Paredes 5', 81'; Malibrán 87'	Report	Giménez 3'; Ramírez 38', 80'; Villaseñor 67'	Stadium: Centenario; Attendance: 6,000

10 December 2000	Reboceros de La Piedad	5–0 (7–1 agg.)	Yucatán	La Piedad, Michoacán
12:00	Endene 6'; Patiño 21'; Fonseca 48'; Hernández 65'; Peña 72'	Report		Stadium: Estadio Juan N. López; Attendance: 16,000

==== Final ====
Team 1	Agg.	Team 2	1st leg	2nd leg
Reboceros de La Piedad	4–6	Gallos de Aguascalientes	1–1	3–5

===== First leg =====
14 December 2000	Gallos de Aguascalientes	1–1	Reboceros de La Piedad	Aguascalientes, Aguascalientes
16:00	Villaseñor 77'	Report	Casséres 53'	Stadium: Estadio Municipal; Attendance: 10,135

===== Second leg =====
17 December 2000	Reboceros de La Piedad	3–5 (4–6 agg.)	Gallos de Aguascalientes	La Piedad, Michoacán
15:00	Patiño 20'; L.F. García 28'; Hernández 33'	Report	Ramírez 2', 30'; Gorsd 51'; López Segoviano 82'; G. García 89'	Stadium: Estadio Juan N. López; Attendance: 16,550

Invierno 2000 winners

1st title

== Verano 2001 ==
=== Changes for Verano 2001 ===
- Ángeles de Puebla was acquired by the Universidad Cuauhtémoc and its name was changed to Real San Sebastián.

=== Group league tables ===
==== Group 1 ====
Pos	Team	Pld	W	D	L	GF	GA	GD	Pts
1	Veracruz	19	11	4	4	31	15	+16	37
2	Atlético Mexiquense	19	8	8	3	29	20	+9	32
3	Toros Neza	19	8	6	5	31	27	+4	30
4	Bachilleres	19	3	10	6	18	20	−2	19
5	Halcones	19	4	5	10	21	32	−11	17

Source: Ascenso MX
Rules for classification: 1st points; 2nd goal difference; 3rd goals scored; 4th head-to-head; 5th away goals scored; 6th draw

==== Group 2 ====
Pos	Team	Pld	W	D	L	GF	GA	GD	Pts
1	La Piedad	19	12	4	3	49	25	+24	40
2	Real San Luis	19	7	5	7	25	26	−1	26
3	Saltillo	19	7	3	9	26	19	+7	24
4	Nacional Tijuana	19	6	5	8	22	26	−4	23
5	RS Zacatecas	19	5	6	8	30	43	−13	21

Source: Ascenso MX
Rules for classification: 1st points; 2nd goal difference; 3rd goals scored; 4th head-to-head; 5th away goals scored; 6th draw

==== Group 3 ====
Pos	Team	Pld	W	D	L	GF	GA	GD	Pts
1	Tigres Ciudad Juárez	19	10	4	5	34	22	+12	34
2	Aguascalientes	19	8	6	5	35	26	+9	30
3	Correcaminos UAT	19	7	7	5	30	27	+3	28
4	Yucatán	19	6	6	7	21	21	0	24
5	Real San Sebastián	19	4	7	8	26	35	−9	19

Source: Ascenso MX
Rules for classification: 1st points; 2nd goal difference; 3rd goals scored; 4th head-to-head; 5th away goals scored; 6th draw

==== Group 4 ====
Pos	Team	Pld	W	D	L	GF	GA	GD	Pts
1	Potros Marte	19	7	6	6	36	37	−1	27
2	Cruz Azul Hidalgo	19	7	5	7	29	27	+2	26
3	Durango	19	4	11	4	25	27	−2	23
4	Lobos UAP	19	3	7	9	18	32	−14	16
5	Zacatepec	19	4	3	12	21	36	−15	15

Source: Ascenso MX
Rules for classification: 1st points; 2nd goal difference; 3rd goals scored; 4th head-to-head; 5th away goals scored; 6th draw

=== General league table ===
Pos	Team	Pld	W	D	L	GF	GA	GD	Pts
1	La Piedad	19	12	4	3	49	25	+24	40
2	Veracruz	19	11	4	4	31	15	+16	37
3	Tigres Ciudad Juárez	19	10	4	5	34	22	+12	34
4	Atlético Mexiquense	19	8	8	3	29	20	+9	32
5	Aguascalientes	19	8	6	5	35	26	+9	30
6	Toros Neza	19	8	6	5	31	27	+4	30
7	Correcaminos UAT	19	7	7	5	30	27	+3	28
8	Potros Marte	19	7	6	6	36	37	−1	27
9	Cruz Azul Hidalgo	19	7	5	7	29	27	+2	26
10	Real San Luis	19	7	5	7	25	26	−1	26
11	Yucatán	19	6	6	7	21	21	0	24
12	Saltillo	19	7	3	9	26	19	+7	24
13	Durango	19	4	11	4	25	27	−2	23
14	Nacional Tijuana	19	6	5	8	22	26	−4	23
15	RS Zacatecas	19	5	6	8	30	43	−13	21
16	Bachilleres	19	3	10	6	18	20	−2	19
17	Real San Sebastián	19	4	7	8	26	35	−9	19
18	Halcones	19	4	5	10	21	32	−11	17
19	Lobos UAP	19	3	7	9	18	32	−14	16
20	Zacatepec	19	4	3	12	21	36	−15	15

Source: Ascenso MX
Rules for classification: 1st points; 2nd goal difference; 3rd goals scored; 4th head-to-head; 5th away goals scored; 6th draw

=== Results ===
Home \ Away	AGS	RSB	AMX	BAC	CRH	DUR	HAL	LAP	NAT	PMA	RSL	RSZ	SAL	TGJ	TOR	UAT	UAP	VER	YUC	ZAC
Aguascalientes			2–1			4–1		2–2		3–2	2–0		3–0	1–2		1–1				3–0
R. San Sebastián	0–2		1–1		3–2	0–0			2–3	2–2	1–2		1–2	1–0						3–2
At. Mexiquense				2–1			2–2	1–1	1–1		1–2					1–1	3–1	1–0	0–0	2–1
Bachilleres	2–2	1–1			1–1		4–0			2–2		2–1	0–1		0–0			3–2		
Cruz Azul Hidalgo	1–0		0–1			2–2				6–2	1–2		1–0	2–0		2–2				2–2
Durango			1–1	0–0			1–1	0–0	2–2		2–2					4–1	2–2		3–0	3–2
Halcones	3–3	0–1			1–0				0–1	2–1		2–3	3–1	1–2	0–0			1–0		
La Piedad		5–3		4–1	3–0		5–1					4–1			5–2		2–1	4–3	2–0	
Nacional	1–2			1–2	0–2			2–1		1–1			3–1	2–1			0–1		1–0	
Potros Marte			2–1			4–0		0–3			3–0		1–2	1–1		3–2	3–1			2–0
Real San Luis				1–1			3–2	1–2	2–0			2–3			1–1	1–2	3–0	0–0	0–0	
RS Zacatecas	1–0	3–3	1–4		0–2	1–1			3–2	3–3			2–2	2–3	2–2					
Saltillo			0–1			2–1		2–1			1–1			2–4		2–1	0–0		0–0	0–1
Tigres Cd. Juárez			2–2	0–0		1–1		1–2			3–1					2–1	3–1		3–0	5–0
Toros Neza	5–3	2–2	1–3		3–0	2–0			2–0	2–2			2–1	0–1						1–0
Correcaminos UAT		2–0		1–1			2–1	2–2	1–1			4–0			0–2		2–1	1–1	1–0	
Lobos UAP	1–1	0–0		1–0	1–1		0–0					2–2			2–4			0–3	1–1	
Veracruz	2–0	1–0			2–1	1–1			1–1	5–0		1–2	2–1	2–0	1–0					
Yucatán	1–1	5–2		1–2	2–2		1–0			1–2		3–1			4–0			0–1		
Zacatepec				1–1			2–1	2–1	1–0		1–2	1–1				2–3	0–1	2–3	1–2	

Updated to match(es) played on 28 April 2001. Source: Memoria Futbolera (subscription required)
Legend: Blue = home team win; Yellow = draw; Red = away team win.

=== Reclassification series ===
Team 1	Agg.	Team 2	1st leg	2nd leg
Toros Neza	8–0	Real San Luis	2–0	6–0
Correcaminos UAT	5–3	Cruz Azul Hidalgo	1–0	4–3

==== First leg ====
2 May 2001	Real San Luis	0–2	Toros Neza	San Luis Potosí, SLP
20:45		Report	Padilla 4'; Parodi 15'	Stadium: Estadio Plan de San Luis; Attendance: 5,000

3 May 2001	Cruz Azul Hidalgo	0–1	Correcaminos UAT	Ciudad Cooperativa, Hidalgo
15:30		Report	Milanzi 89'	Stadium: Estadio 10 de Diciembre; Attendance: 4,000

==== Second leg ====
5 May 2001	Toros Neza	6–0 (8–0 agg.)	Real San Luis	Ciudad Nezahualcóyotl, State of Mexico
16:00	Ventura 11'; Parodi 44'; Guevara 72'; Flores 75' (og); Bocco 84', 86'	Report		Stadium: Estadio Neza 86; Attendance: 10,000

6 May 2001	Correcaminos UAT	4–3 (5–3 agg.)	Cruz Azul Hidalgo	Ciudad Victoria, Tamaulipas
12:00	Mendoza 5', 51', 57'; Fernández 47'	Report	Mora 31'; Reyes 73'; Cabrera 75'	Stadium: Estadio Marte R. Gómez; Attendance: 17,000

=== Liguilla ===
Quarter-finals
1	La Piedad	1	2	3
8	Potros Marte	1	1	2
2	Veracruz	0	1	1
7	Correcaminos UAT	0	2	2
4	Atlético Mexiquense	3	3	6
5	Aguascalientes	1	2	3
3	Tigres Ciudad Juárez	1	1	2
6	Toros Neza	3	1	4

Semi-finals
1	La Piedad	0	4	4
7	Correcaminos UAT	0	1	1
4	Atlético Mexiquense	0	1	1
6	Toros Neza	5	3	8

Final
1	La Piedad	3	4	7
6	Toros Neza	3	2	5

==== Quarter-finals ====
Team 1	Agg.	Team 2	1st leg	2nd leg
Reboceros de La Piedad	3–2	Potros Marte	1–1	2–1
Veracruz	1–2	Correcaminos UAT	0–0	1–2
Atlético Mexiquense	6–3	Gallos de Aguascalientes	3–1	3–2
Tigres Ciudad Juárez	2–4	Toros Neza	1–1	1–3

===== First leg =====
9 May 2001	Gallos de Aguascalientes	1–3	Atlético Mexiquense	Aguascalientes, Aguascalientes
16:00	Giménez 87'	Report	Lugarini 16'; Espinoza 33'; Forbes 46'	Stadium: Estadio Municipal; Attendance: 8,000

9 May 2001	Toros Neza	3–1	Tigres Ciudad Juárez	Ciudad Nezahualcóyotl, State of Mexico
17:00	Padilla 38'; Bocco 59'; Guevara 71'	Report	Vantolra 1'	Stadium: Estadio Neza 86; Attendance: 4,000

9 May 2001	Correcaminos UAT	0–0	Veracruz	Ciudad Victoria, Tamaulipas
17:30		Report		Stadium: Estadio Marte R. Gómez; Attendance: 15,000

10 May 2001	Potros Marte	1–1	Reboceros de La Piedad	Cuernavaca, Morelos
16:30	Pacheco 31'	Report	Patiño 89'	Stadium: Estadio Centenario; Attendance: 2,000

===== Second leg =====
12 May 2001	Atlético Mexiquense	3–2 (6–3 agg.)	Gallos de Aguascalientes	Toluca, State of Mexico
15:00	Villazón 27'; Lugarini 57', 65'	Report	Giménez 70'; García 74'	Stadium: Estadio Nemesio Díez; Attendance: 3,000

12 May 2001	Veracruz	1–2 (1–2 agg.)	Correcaminos UAT	Veracruz, Veracruz
16:00	Salvatierra 62'	Report	Fernández 41'; Sánchez 89'	Stadium: Estadio Luis "Pirata" Fuente; Attendance: 33,000

12 May 2001	Tigres Ciudad Juárez	1–1 (2–4 agg.)	Toros Neza	Ciudad Juárez, Chihuahua
19:00	Silva 1'	Report	Parodi 82'	Stadium: Estadio Olímpico Benito Juárez; Attendance: 10,000

13 May 2001	Reboceros de La Piedad	2–1 (3–2 agg.)	Potros Marte	La Piedad, Michoacán
16:00	Cartes 34'; Patiño 80'	Report	Pacheco 44'	Stadium: Estadio Juan N. López; Attendance: 16,000

==== Semi-finals ====
Team 1	Agg.	Team 2	1st leg	2nd leg
Reboceros de La Piedad	4–1	Correcaminos UAT	0–0	4–1
Atlético Mexiquense	1–8	Toros Neza	0–5	1–3

===== First leg =====
16 May 2001	Toros Neza	5–0	Atlético Mexiquense	Ciudad Nezahualcóyotl, State of Mexico
17:00	De Almeida 12', 54', 83'; Díaz Leal 40'; Ventura 62'	Report		Stadium: Estadio Neza 86; Attendance: 8,000

17 May 2001	Correcaminos UAT	0–0	Reboceros de La Piedad	Ciudad Victoria, Tamaulipas
17:30		Report		Stadium: Estadio Marte R. Gómez; Attendance: 17,000

===== Second leg =====
19 May 2001	Atlético Mexiquense	1–3 (1–8 agg.)	Toros Neza	Toluca, State of Mexico
15:00	Forbes 2'	Report	Parodi 54'; De Almeida 83'; Padilla 90'	Stadium: Estadio Nemesio Díez; Attendance: 12,000

20 May 2001	Reboceros de La Piedad	4–1 (4–1 agg.)	Correcaminos UAT	La Piedad, Michoacán
16:00	Rossello 6'; Rojas 44'; Madrigal 59', 69'	Report	Milanzi 47'	Stadium: Estadio Juan N. López; Attendance: 16,000

==== Final ====
Team 1	Agg.	Team 2	1st leg	2nd leg
Reboceros de La Piedad	7–5	Toros Neza	3–3	4–2

===== First leg =====
24 May 2001	Toros Neza	3–3	Reboceros de La Piedad	Ciudad Nezahualcóyotl, State of Mexico
17:00	Bocco 30'; Parodi 45'; Guevara 87'	Report	Rojas 8'; Patiño 43', 90'	Stadium: Estadio Neza 86; Attendance: 17,100

===== Second leg =====
27 May 2001	Reboceros de La Piedad	4–2 (7–5 agg.)	Toros Neza	La Piedad, Michoacán
16:00	Domínguez 13'; Rossello 50'; Patiño 51'; Rojas 84'	Report	Guevara 65'; Cruz 68'	Stadium: Estadio Juan N. López; Attendance: 16,550

Verano 2001 winners

nth title

=== Top scorers ===
Scorer	Goals	Team
(Uruguay) Héctor Giménez	16	Gallos de Aguascalientes
(Uruguay) Daniel Rossello	13	Reboceros de La Piedad
(Mexico) Christian Patiño	13	Reboceros de La Piedad
(Mexico) Ángel Sosa	12	Real San Sebastián
(Brazil) Marco Antonio de Almeida	11	Toros Neza

== Relegation table ==
Pos.	Team	Pld.	Pts.	Ave.
16.	Bachilleres	114	137	1.2018
17.	Saltillo	114	133	1.1667
18.	Alacranes de Durango	76	88	1.1579
19.	Lobos UAP	114	131	1.1491
20.	Halcones de Querétaro	114	125	1.0965

== Campeón de Ascenso 2001 ==
The Promotion Final faced Gallos de Aguascalientes against Reboceros de La Piedad to determine the winner of the First Division Promotion.

Team 1	Agg.	Team 2	1st leg	2nd leg
Reboceros de La Piedad	4–2	Gallos de Aguascalientes	0–1	4–1

=== First leg ===
31 May 2001	Gallos de Aguascalientes	1–0	Reboceros de La Piedad	Aguascalientes, Aguascalientes
16:00	Giménez 14'	Report		Stadium: Estadio Municipal; Attendance: 10,200

=== Second leg ===
3 June 2001	Reboceros de La Piedad	4–1 (4–2 agg.)	Gallos de Aguascalientes	La Piedad, Michoacán
16:00	Peña 29'; Rossello 32', 46'; Patiño 67'	Report	Giménez 30'	Stadium: Estadio Juan N. López; Attendance: 16,550

Champions

1st title

== First division promotion playoff ==
The Mexican Football Federation decided to increase the number of teams in the Primera División to 19 participants, so it was decided to play a promotion series between Atlante, the last place in the Primera División relegation table, and Veracruz, which was the team with most points in the Primera A season. Finally, Atlante was the winner and remained in Primera División.

Team 1	Agg.	Team 2	1st leg	2nd leg
Atlante	4–1	Veracruz	0–0	4–1

=== First leg ===
7 June 2001	Veracruz	0–0	Atlante	Veracruz, Veracruz
19:00		Report		Stadium: Estadio Luis "Pirata" Fuente; Attendance: 35,000

=== Second leg ===
10 June 2001	Atlante	4–1 (4–1 agg.)	Veracruz	Mexico City
13:00	Serafín 16'; Sol 29'; Abundis 57', 61'	Report	Hernández 50'	Stadium: Estadio Azul; Attendance: 27,500

== Relegation playoff ==
A relegation series faced Halcones de Querétaro, last team in the Primera A relegation table, against Potros Zitácuaro, champion of the Second Division.

Team 1	Agg.	Team 2	1st leg	2nd leg
Halcones de Querétaro	2–2	Potros Zitácuaro (pen.)	0–2	2–0

=== First leg ===
27 May 2001	Potros Zitácuaro	2–0	Halcones de Querétaro	Zitácuaro, Michoacán
12:00	Vázquez 64'; De Rosas 84'	Report		Stadium: Estadio Ignacio López Rayón; Attendance: 3,000

=== Second leg ===
2 June 2001	Halcones de Querétaro	2–0 (2–2 agg.) (5–6 p)	Potros Zitácuaro	Querétaro, Querétaro
16:00	Santacruz 29'; Saldaña 47'	Report		Stadium: Estadio Corregidora; Attendance: 7,000
	Penalties
	Olmedo (penalty scored); Cruz (penalty scored); Hernández (penalty missed); Rasic (penalty scored); Saldaña (penalty scored); Rojas (penalty scored); Méndez (penalty missed)		Jiménez (penalty scored); Martínez (penalty missed); Juárez (penalty scored); Vázquez (penalty scored); Ugalde (penalty scored); Baca (penalty scored); Gallegos (penalty scored)
