= 1999–2000 Primera División A season =

Season of a Mexican football league

Primera División A
- Season: 1999–2000
- Champions: Invierno: Irapuato (1st Title); Verano: Irapuato (2nd title)
- Promoted: Irapuato
- Relegated: Halcones de Querétaro
- Top goalscorer: Invierno: Cristián Ariel Morales (19); Verano: Carlos Muñoz (15)

Primera División A (Méxican First A Division) is a Mexican football tournament. This season was composed of Invieno 1999 and Verano 2000. Irapuato F.C. was the winner of the promotion to First Division after being champion in the two tournaments of the season.

== Changes for the 1999–2000 season ==
- Cuautitlán relocated to Puebla and renamed Lobos UAP.
- Tigrillos relocated to Ciudad Juárez and renamed Tigres de Ciudad Juárez.
- Ángeles de Puebla was a team created to occupy the place left by Puebla F.C. that remained in First Division after its owners bought the Union de Curtidores franchise.
- Chivas Tijuana renamed Nacional Tijuana.
- Alacranes de Durango was promoted from Second Division.

== Stadiums and locations ==
Location of teams in the 1999–2000 Primera División A

Club	Stadium	Capacity	City
Aguascalientes	Municipal de Aguascalientes	12,500	Aguascalientes, Aguascalientes
Ángeles	Cuauhtémoc	42,648	Puebla, Puebla
Atlético Mexiquense	Nemesio Díez	35,000	Toluca, State of Mexico
Bachilleres	Jalisco	60,000	Guadalajara, Jalisco
Cruz Azul Hidalgo	10 de Diciembre	17,000	Cruz Azul, Hidalgo
Correcaminos UAT	Marte R. Gómez	20,000	Ciudad Victoria, Tamaulipas
Durango	Francisco Zarco	15,000	Durango, Durango
Halcones de Querétaro	Corregidora	35,000	Querétaro, Querétaro
Irapuato	Sergio León Chávez	26,000	Irapuato, Guanajuato
Jaguares de Colima	Colima	12,000	Colima, Colima
La Piedad	Juan N. López	15,000	La Piedad, Michoacán
Lobos UAP	Cuauhtémoc	42,648	Puebla, Puebla
Nacional Tijuana	Cerro Colorado	12,000	Tijuana, Baja California
Real San Luis	Plan de San Luis	18,000	San Luis Potosí, S.L.P.
RS Zacatecas	Francisco Villa	18,000	Zacatecas, Zacatecas
Saltillo	Francisco I. Madero	10,000	Saltillo, Coahuila
Tigres de Ciudad Juárez	Olímpico Benito Juárez	22,000	Ciudad Juárez, Chihuahua
Veracruz	Luis "Pirata" Fuente	33,000	Veracruz, Veracruz
Yucatán	Carlos Iturralde	24,000	Mérida, Yucatán
Zacatepec	Agustín Coruco Díaz	18,000	Zacatepec, Morelos

== Invierno 1999 ==
=== Group league tables ===
==== Group 1 ====
Pos	Team	Pld	W	D	L	GF	GA	GD	Pts
1	Ángeles de Puebla	19	9	6	4	29	21	+8	33
2	La Piedad	19	7	4	8	32	32	0	25
3	Nacional Tijuana	19	6	6	7	30	42	−12	24
4	Saltillo	19	4	6	9	32	51	−19	18
5	Halcones de Querétaro	19	2	4	13	31	47	−16	10

Source: Memoria Futbolera (subscription required)
Rules for classification: 1st points; 2nd goal difference; 3rd goals scored; 4th head-to-head; 5th away goals scored; 6th draw

==== Group 2 ====
Pos	Team	Pld	W	D	L	GF	GA	GD	Pts
1	Irapuato	19	12	2	5	57	27	+30	38
2	RS Zacatecas	19	10	4	5	37	26	+11	34
3	Correcaminos UAT	19	9	6	4	39	24	+15	33
4	Atlético Mexiquense	19	6	7	6	29	29	0	25
5	Veracruz	19	8	0	11	33	36	−3	24

Source: Memoria Futbolera (subscription required)
Rules for classification: 1st points; 2nd goal difference; 3rd goals scored; 4th head-to-head; 5th away goals scored; 6th draw

==== Group 3 ====
Pos	Team	Pld	W	D	L	GF	GA	GD	Pts
1	Zacatepec	19	10	6	3	39	23	+16	36
2	Cruz Azul Hidalgo	19	8	7	4	36	27	+9	31
3	Bachilleres	19	8	5	6	27	25	+2	29
4	Lobos UAP	19	5	6	8	34	37	−3	21
5	Tigres Ciudad Juárez	19	3	8	8	24	37	−13	17

Source: Memoria Futbolera (subscription required)
Rules for classification: 1st points; 2nd goal difference; 3rd goals scored; 4th head-to-head; 5th away goals scored; 6th draw

==== Group 4 ====
Pos	Team	Pld	W	D	L	GF	GA	GD	Pts
1	Real San Luis	19	10	5	4	44	25	+19	35
2	Jaguares	19	7	4	8	24	30	−6	25
3	Durango	19	5	8	6	23	30	−7	23
4	Yucatán	19	6	4	9	24	36	−12	22
5	Aguascalientes	19	3	6	10	25	44	−19	15

Source: Memoria Futbolera (subscription required)
Rules for classification: 1st points; 2nd goal difference; 3rd goals scored; 4th head-to-head; 5th away goals scored; 6th draw

=== General league table ===
Pos	Team	Pld	W	D	L	GF	GA	GD	Pts
1	Irapuato	19	12	2	5	57	27	+30	38
2	Zacatepec	19	10	6	3	39	23	+16	36
3	Real San Luis	19	10	5	4	44	25	+19	35
4	RS Zacatecas	19	10	4	5	37	26	+11	34
5	Correcaminos UAT	19	9	6	4	39	24	+15	33
6	Ángeles de Puebla	19	9	6	4	29	21	+8	33
7	Cruz Azul Hidalgo	19	8	7	4	36	27	+9	31
8	Bachilleres	19	8	5	6	27	25	+2	29
9	La Piedad	19	7	4	8	32	32	0	25
10	Atlético Mexiquense	19	6	7	6	29	29	0	25
11	Jaguares	19	7	4	8	24	30	−6	25
12	Veracruz	19	8	0	11	33	36	−3	24
13	Nacional Tijuana	19	6	6	7	30	42	−12	24
14	Durango	19	5	8	6	23	30	−7	23
15	Yucatán	19	6	4	9	24	36	−12	22
16	Lobos UAP	19	5	6	8	34	37	−3	21
17	Saltillo	19	4	6	9	32	51	−19	18
18	Tigres Ciudad Juárez	19	3	8	8	24	37	−13	17
19	Aguascalientes	19	3	6	10	25	44	−19	15
20	Halcones de Querétaro	19	2	4	13	31	47	−16	10

Source: Memoria Futbolera (subscription required)
Rules for classification: 1st points; 2nd goal difference; 3rd goals scored; 4th head-to-head; 5th away goals scored; 6th draw

=== Results ===
Home \ Away	AGS	ANG	AMX	BAC	CRH	DUR	HAL	IRA	JAG	LAP	NAT	RSL	RSZ	SAL	TGJ	UAT	UAP	VER	YUC	ZAC
Aguascalientes			0–2			1–2	4–3	1–0	2–2		3–3		1–3	1–2					1–2	
Ángeles	1–1				1–2	1–1	2–1	4–2				0–3				2–2		2–0		1–1
At. Mexiquense		1–0		1–0					2–0	1–2		2–2			1–1		3–1		1–2	0–0
Bachilleres	2–0	1–2			1–1		1–0	1–3				3–2				2–1	2–0	3–2		2–2
Cruz Azul Hidalgo	1–1		4–3			3–1	2–2	2–0			2–0		1–2	4–1		2–1				
Durango			1–1	0–0					0–0	1–3	1–1		0–0	2–0	2–1			1–0	0–0	
Halcones			2–2			2–2		0–2	1–0	1–4	3–3		1–1	5–1					4–5	
Irapuato			4–5			3–1			5–0	3–0	5–1		3–1	3–0	2–1			5–1	6–1	
Jaguares		1–0		2–0	1–1					2–1		1–2			2–0		1–1			2–5
La Piedad	1–3	2–3		0–0	0–0							3–2			4–1	0–2	4–4			0–0
Nacional Tijuana			3–2	0–0					1–4	2–1			2–1	0–0	2–3		2–1	2–1	2–2	
Real San Luis	8–1				1–1	1–1	1–0	3–3			4–0			4–1		2–2		2–0		3–1
RS Zacatecas		1–1	1–1	1–3					3–0	0–0		2–1			7–2		2–1	2–1	2–0	
Saltillo		1–1	1–1	3–1					1–2	2–3			3–3		1–1		3–3	5–1	4–2	
Tigres Cd. Juárez	1–1	0–2		1–1	1–1		5–1					1–2				1–1	2–1			0–0
Correcaminos UAT	2–2		3–0			4–1	3–1	3–2	2–0	1–1			3–1	5–2						
Lobos UAP	3–0	0–0			2–2	3–3	3–1	0–4				0–1				3–3		3–1		3–2
Veracruz	4–1		2–0		0–2		2–1		3–2	3–1						0–1			5–0	3–2
Yucatán		0–1		1–2	2–1					1–1		3–0			1–1	2–0	0–2			0–1
Zacatepec	0–0				4–2	2–1	3–2	2–2			1–0		1–0	8–0		1–0				

Updated to match(es) played on 20 November 1999. Source: Memoria Futbolera (subscription required)
Legend: Blue = home team win; Yellow = draw; Red = away team win.

=== Reclassification series ===
Team 1	Agg.	Team 2	1st leg	2nd leg
Bachilleres	1–4	Reboceros de La Piedad	0–1	1–3
Correcaminos UAT	5–5	Jaguares de Colima	2–4	3–1

==== First leg ====
24 November 1999	Reboceros de La Piedad	1–0	Bachilleres	La Piedad, Michoacán
14:30	Salcedo 68'	Report		Stadium: Estadio Juan N. López

25 November 1999	Jaguares de Colima	4–2	Correcaminos UAT	Colima, Colima
15:00	Ávila 2', 18'; Martínez 53'; T'Changó 63'	Report	Fasciolli 45'; Ortega 73'	Stadium: Estadio Colima

==== Second leg ====
27 November 1999	Bachilleres	1–3 (1–4 agg.)	Reboceros de La Piedad	Guadalajara, Jalisco
16:00	Pérez 86'	Report	Endene 40', 70'; Nya 88'	Stadium: Estadio Jalisco

28 November 1999	Correcaminos UAT	3–1 (5–5 agg.)	Jaguares de Colima	Ciudad Victoria, Tamaulipas
12:00	Fascioli 8'; González 58'; Ortega 78'	Report	García 74'	Stadium: Estadio Marte R. Gómez

=== Liguilla ===
Quarter-finals
1	Irapuato	1	2	3
8	Reboceros de La Piedad	1	0	1
4	RS Zacatecas	2	4	6
5	Correcaminos UAT	0	2	2
2	Zacatepec	2	0	2
7	Cruz Azul Hidalgo	0	2	2
3	Real San Luis	2	3	5
6	Ángeles de Puebla	2	0	2

Semi-finals
1	Irapuato	1	1	2
4	RS Zacatecas	0	1	1
2	Zacatepec	1	2	3
3	Real San Luis	0	1	1

Final
1	Irapuato	3	2	5
2	Zacatepec	1	2	3

==== Quarter-finals ====
Team 1	Agg.	Team 2	1st leg	2nd leg
Irapuato	3–1	Reboceros de La Piedad	1–1	2–0
Zacatepec	2–2	Cruz Azul Hidalgo	2–0	0–2
Real San Luis	5–2	Ángeles de Puebla	2–2	3–0
RS Zacatecas	6–2	Correcaminos UAT	2–0	4–2

===== First leg =====
1 December 1999	Cruz Azul Hidalgo	2–0	Zacatepec	Ciudad Cruz Azul, Hidalgo
13:00	Campos 8'; Hernández 38'	Report		Stadium: Estadio 10 de Diciembre; Attendance: 5,000

1 December 1999	Reboceros de La Piedad	1–1	Irapuato	La Piedad, Michoacán
14:30	Nya 10'	Report	Morales 29'	Stadium: Estadio Juan N. López; Attendance: 15,000

1 December 1999	Ángeles de Puebla	2–2	Real San Luis	Puebla, Puebla
20:00	Santacruz 40'; Córdova 89'	Report	Cruz 22'; Lemus 41'	Stadium: Estadio Cuauhtémoc; Attendance: 11,000

1 December 1999	Correcaminos UAT	0–2	RS Zacatecas	Ciudad Victoria, Tamaulipas
20:30		Report	Bocco 20'; Asprilla 68'	Stadium: Estadio Marte R. Gómez; Attendance: 6,000

===== Second leg =====
4 December 1999	Zacatepec	2–0 (2–2 agg.)	Cruz Azul Hidalgo	Zacatepec, Morelos
15:00	Andrade 35', 40'	Report		Stadium: Estadio Agustín Coruco Díaz; Attendance: 15,000

4 December 1999	RS Zacatecas	4–2 (6–2 agg.)	Correcaminos UAT	Zacatecas, Zacatecas
19:00	Bocco 8'; Romero 17'; Salinas 62'; Centurión 89'	Report	González 52'; Ortega 64'	Stadium: Estadio Francisco Villa; Attendance: 12,000

4 December 1999	Irapuato	2–0 (3–1 agg.)	Reboceros de La Piedad	Irapuato, Guanajuato
19:00	Morales 73'; Flores 89'	Report		Stadium: Estadio Sergio León Chávez; Attendance: 15,000

4 December 1999	Real San Luis	3–0 (5–2 agg.)	Ángeles de Puebla	San Luis Potosí, SLP
20:30	Nieto 8'; Melillo 17'; Betancourt 62'	Report		Stadium: Estadio Plan de San Luis; Attendance: 10,000

==== Semi-finals ====
Team 1	Agg.	Team 2	1st leg	2nd leg
Irapuato	2–1	RS Zacatecas	1–0	1-1
Zacatepec	3–1	Real San Luis	1–0	2–1

===== First leg =====
8 December 1999	RS Zacatecas	0–1	Irapuato	Zacatecas, Zacatecas
20:00		Report	De la Torre 4'	Stadium: Estadio Francisco Villa; Attendance: 13,000

8 December 1999	Real San Luis	0–1	Zacatepec	San Luis Potosí, SLP
20:30		Report	Arboleda 8'	Stadium: Estadio Plan de San Luis; Attendance: 12,000

===== Second leg =====
11 December 1999	Zacatepec	2–2 (3–2 agg.)	Real San Luis	Zacatepec, Morelos
15:00	Vara 17'; Collazo 68'	Report	Sosa 30'; Nieto 51'	Stadium: Estadio Agustín Coruco Díaz; Attendance: 15,000

11 December 1999	Irapuato	1–1 (2–1 agg.)	RS Zacatecas	Irapuato, Guanajuato
19:00	Briceño 61'	Report	Salinas 34'	Stadium: Estadio Sergio León Chávez; Attendance: 25,000

==== Final ====
Team 1	Agg.	Team 2	1st leg	2nd leg
Irapuato	5–3	Zacatepec	3–1	2–2

===== First leg =====
15 December 1999	Zacatepec	1–3	Irapuato	Zacatepec, Morelos
15:00	Padilla 70'	Report	Morales 30'; Toledano 46'; García 53'	Stadium: Estadio Agustín Coruco Díaz; Attendance: 16,000

===== Second leg =====
18 December 1999	Irapuato	2–2 (5–3 agg.)	Zacatepec	Irapuato, Guanajuato
19:00	Rodríguez 27'; Morales 62'	Report	Andrade 45'; Rivera 67'	Stadium: Estadio Sergio León Chávez; Attendance: 26,000

Invierno 1999 winners
Irapuato F.C.
1st title

=== Top scorers ===
Scorer	Goals	Team
(Argentina) Cristián Ariel Morales	17	Irapuato
(Uruguay) Daniel Fasciolli	15	Correcaminos UAT
(Cameroon) François Endene	14	Reboceros de La Piedad
(Argentina) Martín Rodríguez	12	Irapuato
(Argentina) Osvaldo Nartallo	11	Ángeles de Puebla
(Mexico) Fabián Hernández	11	Gallos de Aguascalientes
(Mexico) Alejandro Corona	10	Cruz Azul Hidalgo

== Verano 2000 ==
=== Group league tables ===
==== Group 1 ====
Pos	Team	Pld	W	D	L	GF	GA	GD	Pts
1	Ángeles de Puebla	19	9	5	5	33	26	+7	32
2	Halcones de Querétaro (R)	19	8	6	5	27	22	+5	30
3	Nacional Tijuana	19	7	5	7	23	21	+2	26
4	Saltillo	19	5	5	9	27	32	−5	20
5	La Piedad	19	5	4	10	28	41	−13	19

Source: Memoria Futbolera (subscription required)
Rules for classification: 1st points; 2nd goal difference; 3rd goals scored; 4th head-to-head; 5th away goals scored; 6th draw
(R) Relegated

==== Group 2 ====
Pos	Team	Pld	W	D	L	GF	GA	GD	Pts
1	Irapuato	19	11	3	5	44	34	+10	36
2	Veracruz	19	7	7	5	32	24	+8	28
3	Atlético Mexiquense	19	8	4	7	37	38	−1	28
4	Correcaminos UAT	19	6	6	7	38	30	+8	24
5	RS Zacatecas	19	5	8	6	24	27	−3	23

Source: Memoria Futbolera (subscription required)
Rules for classification: 1st points; 2nd goal difference; 3rd goals scored; 4th head-to-head; 5th away goals scored; 6th draw

==== Group 3 ====
Pos	Team	Pld	W	D	L	GF	GA	GD	Pts
1	Cruz Azul Hidalgo	19	9	4	6	28	25	+3	31
2	Tigres Ciudad Juárez	19	7	6	6	27	26	+1	27
3	Zacatepec	19	7	6	6	22	25	−3	27
4	Lobos UAP	19	6	8	5	39	35	+4	26
5	Bachilleres	19	2	8	9	18	31	−13	14

Source: Memoria Futbolera (subscription required)
Rules for classification: 1st points; 2nd goal difference; 3rd goals scored; 4th head-to-head; 5th away goals scored; 6th draw

==== Group 4 ====
Pos	Team	Pld	W	D	L	GF	GA	GD	Pts
1	Real San Luis	19	11	3	5	38	27	+11	36
2	Yucatán	19	7	7	5	28	27	+1	28
3	Alacranes de Durango	19	6	5	8	24	27	−3	23
4	Jaguares de Colima	19	5	4	10	26	37	−11	19
5	Gallos de Aguascalientes	19	4	6	9	17	25	−8	18

Source: Memoria Futbolera (subscription required)
Rules for classification: 1st points; 2nd goal difference; 3rd goals scored; 4th head-to-head; 5th away goals scored; 6th draw

=== General league table ===
Pos	Team	Pld	W	D	L	GF	GA	GD	Pts
1	Real San Luis	19	11	3	5	38	27	+11	36
2	Irapuato	19	11	3	5	44	34	+10	36
3	Ángeles de Puebla	19	9	5	5	33	26	+7	32
4	Cruz Azul Hidalgo	19	9	4	6	28	25	+3	31
5	Halcones de Querétaro (R)	19	8	6	5	27	22	+5	30
6	Veracruz	19	7	7	5	32	24	+8	28
7	Yucatán	19	7	7	5	28	27	+1	28
8	Atlético Mexiquense	19	8	4	7	37	38	−1	28
9	Tigres Ciudad Juárez	19	7	6	6	27	26	+1	27
10	Zacatepec	19	7	6	6	22	25	−3	27
11	Lobos UAP	19	6	8	5	39	35	+4	26
12	Nacional Tijuana	19	7	5	7	23	21	+2	26
13	Correcaminos UAT	19	6	6	7	38	30	+8	24
14	RS Zacatecas	19	5	8	6	24	27	−3	23
15	Alacranes de Durango	19	6	5	8	24	27	−3	23
16	Saltillo	19	5	5	9	27	32	−5	20
17	Jaguares de Colima	19	5	4	10	26	37	−11	19
18	La Piedad	19	5	4	10	28	41	−13	19
19	Gallos de Aguascalientes	19	4	6	9	17	25	−8	18
20	Bachilleres	19	2	8	9	18	31	−13	14

(R) Relegated

=== Results ===
Home \ Away	AGS	ANG	AMX	BAC	CRH	DUR	HAL	IRA	JAG	LAP	NAT	RSL	RSZ	SAL	TGJ	UAT	UAP	VER	YUC	ZAC
Aguascalientes		0–0		0–0	0–2					2–1		0–3			3–1	1–2	1–3	0–1		2–2
Ángeles			4–2	1–1					4–2	1–1			1–1	2–1	2–0		4–2		2–2	
At. Mexiquense	2–2				3–1	0–2	1–1	4–5			3–2		2–1	2–1		2–1		3–1		
Bachilleres			1–0			2–1			1–5	1–1	2–2		2–2	2–2	0–2				1–2	
Cruz Azul Hidalgo		0–1		1–0					2–1	2–1		1–3			2–2		2–1	0–0	4–1	0–0
Durango	1–0	0–1			1–1		1–2	1–3				2–2				3–2	2–0			1–1
Halcones	2–1	1–0		0–0	1–2							1–2			5–1	2–1	1–1	2–2		1–0
Irapuato	3–0	2–1		3–2	3–1		4–1					3–1				3–2	2–5			1–0
Jaguares	0–3		2–2			4–2	1–1	1–1			0–1		2–1	2–0		2–5		1–5		
La Piedad			1–0			3–4	0–2	1–4	2–0		4–2		3–1	2–3				1–3	3–3	
Nacional Tijuana	0–0	1–0			4–1	0–0	1–0	1–0				0–1				1–1				3–0
Real San Luis		2–4	3–4	1–1					3–0	4–0			2–1	2–1	2–1		2–2		2–1	
RS Zacatecas	0–0				2–1	0–0	1–1	1–0			2–1			3–1		1–1				0–0
Saltillo	1–0				0–3	3–1	1–2	4–2			3–1	0–1				4–3				0–0
Tigres Cd. Juárez			1–2			1–1		5–3	1–0	0–0	2–2		2–1	1–0				1–0	0–0	
Correcaminos UAT		4–1		1–1	1–2					5–0		2–3			2–1		1–1	0–0	2–0	2–2
Lobos UAP			4–4	3–1					1–0	4–3	1–0		3–3	2–2	1–1				1–2	
Veracruz		2–3		1–0		1–0		2–2			0–0	3–1	3–0	1–1			2–2			
Yucatán	1–2		3–1			1–0	2–1	1–1	2–2		0–0		2–3	1–1				2–1		
Zacatepec		2–1	2–0	2–1					0–1	2–0		1–0			0–4		3–2	5–4	0–2	

Updated to match(es) played on 14 May 2000. Source: Memoria Futbolera (subscription required)
Legend: Blue = home team win; Yellow = draw; Red = away team win.

=== Reclassification series ===
Team 1	Agg.	Team 2	1st leg	2nd leg
Atlético Mexiquense	3–3	Nacional Tijuana	0–2	3–1

==== First leg ====
17 May 2000	Nacional Tijuana	2–0	Atlético Mexiquense	Tijuana, Baja California
19:30	Arteaga 18'; Mora 63'	Report		Stadium: Estadio Cerro Colorado

==== Second leg ====
20 May 2000	Atlético Mexiquense	3–1 (3–3 agg.)	Nacional Tijuana	Toluca, State of Mexico
12:00	Guadarrama 8'; Dos Santos 28', 78'	Report	Gaytán 83'	Stadium: Estadio Nemesio Díez

=== Liguilla ===
Quarter-finals
2	Irapuato	5	4	9
7	Atlético Mexiquense	2	1	3
3	Ángeles de Puebla	1	6	7
6	Yucatán	3	0	3
1	Real San Luis	2	1	3
8	Tigres Ciudad Juárez	2	1	3
4	Cruz Azul Hidalgo	2	2	4
5	Veracruz	1	0	1

Semi-finals
2	Irapuato	1	2	3
3	Ángeles de Puebla	1	0	1
1	Real San Luis	1	1	2
4	Cruz Azul Hidalgo	1	2	3

Final
1	Irapuato (pen.)	2	2	4 (4)
4	Cruz Azul Hidalgo	2	2	4 (2)

==== Quarter-finals ====
Team 1	Agg.	Team 2	1st leg	2nd leg
Irapuato	9–3	Atlético Mexiquense	5–2	4–1
Ángeles de Puebla	7–3	Yucatán	1–3	6–0
Real San Luis	3–3	Tigres Ciudad Juárez	2–2	1–1
Cruz Azul Hidalgo	4–1	Veracruz	2–1	2–0

===== First leg =====
24 May 2000	Atlético Mexiquense	2–5	Irapuato	Toluca, State of Mexico
12:00	Dos Santos 10'; Espinoza 35'	Report	Morales 17', 52'; García 43'; Rodríguez 56', 79'	Stadium: Estadio Nemesio Díez

24 May 2000	Yucatán	3–1	Ángeles de Puebla	Mérida, Yucatán
16:30	Díaz 10'; Rico 38', 53'	Report	Gómez 27'	Stadium: Estadio Carlos Iturralde; Attendance: 11,000

24 May 2000	Tigres Ciudad Juárez	2–2	Real San Luis	Ciudad Juárez, Chihuahua
20:00	Ayala 42'; Oviedo 51'	Report	Melillo 70'; Lemus 88'	Stadium: Estadio Olímpico Benito Juárez; Attendance: 6,000

24 May 2000	Veracruz	2–1	Cruz Azul Hidalgo	Veracruz, Veracruz
20:30	De Almeida 32'; Zwaricz 71'	Report	Ledezma 44'	Stadium: Estadio Luis "Pirata" Fuente; Attendance: 15,000

===== Second leg =====
27 May 2000	Cruz Azul Hidalgo	2–0 (3–2 agg.)	Veracruz	Ciudad Cruz Azul, Hidalgo
12:00	Reséndiz 54'; Mancera 89'	Report		Stadium: Estadio 10 de Diciembre; Attendance: 5,000

27 May 2000	Ángeles de Puebla	6–0 (7–3 agg.)	Yucatán	Puebla, Puebla
16:00	Nartallo 39' (68); Córdova 52'; Capetillo 64'; Jiménez 72'; Bravo 82'	Report		Stadium: Estadio Cuauhtémoc; Attendance: 10,000

27 May 2000	Irapuato	4–1 (9–3 agg.)	Atlético Mexiquense	Irapuato, Guanajuato
19:00	Morales 7', 73'; Saavedra 31'; Toledano 72'	Report	Dos Santos 26'	Stadium: Estadio Sergio León Chávez; Attendance: 15,000

27 May 2000	Real San Luis	1–1 (2–2 agg.)	Tigres Ciudad Juárez	San Luis Potosí, SLP
20:30	Nieto 3'	Report	Reséndiz 60'	Stadium: Estadio Plan de San Luis; Attendance: 10,000

==== Semi-finals ====
Team 1	Agg.	Team 2	1st leg	2nd leg
Irapuato	3–1	Ángeles de Puebla	1–1	2–0
Real San Luis	2–3	Cruz Azul Hidalgo	2–1	1–1

===== First leg =====
31 May 2000	Cruz Azul Hidalgo	2–1	Real San Luis	Ciudad Cruz Azul, Hidalgo
16:00	Corral 26'; Reséndiz 37'	Report	Martínez 40'	Stadium: Estadio 10 de Diciembre; Attendance: 6,000

31 May 2000	Ángeles de Puebla	1–1	Irapuato	Puebla, Puebla
19:00	Capetillo 64'	Report	Tavira 77'	Stadium: Estadio Cuauhtémoc; Attendance: 13,000

===== Second leg =====
3 June 2000	Irapuato	2–0 (3–1 agg.)	Ángeles de Puebla	Irapuato, Guanajuato
19:00	Saavedra 38'; Morales 62'	Report		Stadium: Estadio Sergio León Chávez; Attendance: 25,000

3 June 2000	Real San Luis	1–1 (2–3 agg.)	Cruz Azul Hidalgo	San Luis Potosí, SLP
20:30	Nieto 3'	Report	Reséndiz 60'	Stadium: Estadio Plan de San Luis; Attendance: 6,550

==== Final ====
Team 1	Agg.	Team 2	1st leg	2nd leg
Irapuato (pen.)	4–4	Cruz Azul Hidalgo	2–2	2–2

===== First leg =====
7 June 2000	Cruz Azul Hidalgo	2–2	Irapuato	Ciudad Cruz Azul, Hidalgo
16:00	Ledezma 13'; Owusu 74'	Report	Gutiérrez 3'; Rodríguez 64'	Stadium: Estadio 10 de Diciembre; Attendance: 10,135

===== Second leg =====
10 June 2000	Irapuato	2–2 (4–4 agg.) (4–2 p)	Cruz Azul Hidalgo	Irapuato, Guanajuato
19:00	Morales 31'; Rodríguez 50'	Report	Corona 15'; Owusu 74'	Stadium: Estadio Sergio León Chávez; Attendance: 26,550
	Penalties
	Rodríguez (penalty scored); Morales (penalty scored); Saavedra (penalty scored); Gómez (penalty scored)		Reséndiz (penalty scored); Nemec (penalty scored); Marín (penalty missed); Ramírez (penalty missed)

Verano 2000 winners
Irapuato F.C.
2nd title

=== Top scorers ===
Scorer	Goals	Team
(Spain) Carlos Muñoz	15	Lobos UAP
(Brazil) Emmanuel Sacramento	15	Lobos UAP
(Argentina) Horacio Marcelo Arce	14	Halcones
(Uruguay) Martín Rodríguez	14	Irapuato
(Mexico) Arturo Rico	12	Yucatán

== Relegation table ==
Pos.	Team	Pld.	Pts.	Ave.
16.	Alacranes de Durango	38	46	1.2105
17.	Bachilleres	116	136	1.1724
18.	Lobos UAP	116	133	1.1466
19.	Jaguares de Colima	116	132	1.1379
20.	Halcones de Querétaro	116	125	1.0776

== Campeón de Ascenso 2000 ==
Irapuato were champions of the Invierno 1999 and Verano 2000 tournaments, automatically winning the Campeón de Ascenso and gained the promotion to Primera División.
