= 2005–06 Primera División A season =

Season of a Mexican football league

Primera División A
- Season: 2005–06
- Champions: Apertura: Puebla (1st Title); Clausura: Querétaro (2nd title)
- Promoted: Querétaro
- Relegated: Tijuana; Irapuato
- Top goalscorer: Apertura: Mauricio Romero Alvizu (16); Clausura: Diego Olsina (15)

Primera División A (Méxican First A Division) is a Mexican football tournament. This season was composed of Apertura 2005 and Clausura 2006. Querétaro was the winner of the promotion to First Division after winning Puebla in the promotion playoff.

== Changes for the 2005–06 season ==
- Chivas La Piedad relocated to Tepic and renamed to Chivas Coras.
- Celaya relocated to Salamanca and renamed Petroleros de Salamanca.
- Mérida F.C. was acquired by new owners, for that reason the team was moved to Irapuato and renamed Club Irapuato.
- Pachuca Juniors relocated to Ciudad Juárez and renamed Indios.
- Pioneros de Obregón relocated to Tijuana and renamed Dorados de Tijuana.
- Potros Neza was relocated to Tampico and renamed Tampico Madero.
- Académicos de Atlas was promoted from Second Division, the club was renamed Coyotes de Sonora and re-located to Hermosillo, Sonora.
- Huracanes de Colima was bought by Televisa, the team relocated to Playa del Carmen and renamed to Águilas Riviera Maya. At the end of the Apertura tournament, the team was relocated to Zacatepec as a result of Hurricane Wilma impact. From the Clausura tournament, the team was renamed as Club Zacatepec.
- Rayados A and Tigres Mochis new teams.

== Stadiums and locations ==
Club	Stadium	Capacity	City
Águilas Riviera Maya	Mario Villanueva Madrid	7,000	Playa del Carmen, Quintana Roo
Atlético Mexiquense	Nemesio Díez	35,000	Toluca, State of Mexico
Chivas Coras	Nicolás Álvarez Ortega	7,000	Tepic, Nayarit
Coatzacoalcos	Rafael Hernández Ochoa	4,800	Coatzacoalcos, Veracruz
Correcaminos UAT	Marte R. Gómez	20,000	Ciudad Victoria, Tamaulipas
Coyotes de Sonora	Héroe de Nacozari	22,000	Hermosillo, Sonora
Cruz Azul Oaxaca	Benito Juárez	15,000	Oaxaca, Oaxaca
Durango	Francisco Zarco	15,000	Durango, Durango
Indios	Olímpico Benito Juárez	22,000	Ciudad Juárez, Chihuahua
Irapuato	Sergio León Chávez	28,500	Irapuato, Guanajuato
León	Nou Camp	35,000	León, Guanajuato
Lobos BUAP	Olímpico BUAP	20,000	Puebla, Puebla
Puebla	Cuauhtémoc	42,600	Puebla, Puebla
Rayados A	El Barrial / Tecnológico	1,000 / 36,000	Monterrey, Nuevo León
Querétaro	Corregidora	35,000	Querétaro, Querétaro
Salamanca	Olímpico Sección 24	10,000	Salamanca, Guanajuato
Tabasco	Olímpico de Villahermosa	12,000	Villahermosa, Tabasco
Tampico Madero	Tamaulipas	30,000	Tampico - Madero, Tamaulipas
Tigres Mochis	Centenario LM	7,000	Los Mochis, Sinaloa
Tijuana	Unidad Deportiva CREA	10,000	Tijuana, Baja California

=== Clausura 2006 new team ===
Club	Stadium	Capacity	City
Zacatepec	Agustín Coruco Díaz	18,000	Zacatepec, Morelos

Location of teams in the 2005-2006 Primera División A

== Apertura 2005 ==
=== Group league tables ===
==== Group 1 ====
Pos	Team	Pld	W	D	L	GF	GA	GD	Pts
1	Correcaminos UAT	19	12	4	3	38	20	+18	40
2	Puebla	19	10	3	6	29	22	+7	33
3	Indios	19	10	2	7	29	26	+3	32
4	Tigres Mochis	19	8	3	8	32	29	+3	27
5	Tampico Madero	19	7	5	7	21	27	−6	26

Source: Ascenso MX and Soccerway
Rules for classification: 1st points; 2nd goal difference; 3rd goals scored; 4th head-to-head; 5th away goals scored; 6th draw

==== Group 2 ====
Pos	Team	Pld	W	D	L	GF	GA	GD	Pts
1	Durango	19	6	8	5	25	25	0	26
2	León	19	6	7	6	30	28	+2	25
3	Tabasco	19	7	4	8	21	32	−11	25
4	Salamanca	19	6	5	8	21	28	−7	23
5	Lobos BUAP	19	5	4	10	24	37	−13	19

Source: Ascenso MX and Soccerway
Rules for classification: 1st points; 2nd goal difference; 3rd goals scored; 4th head-to-head; 5th away goals scored; 6th draw

==== Group 3 ====
Pos	Team	Pld	W	D	L	GF	GA	GD	Pts
1	Cruz Azul Oaxaca	19	10	3	6	34	24	+10	33
2	Querétaro	19	10	3	6	23	17	+6	33
3	Coyotes de Sonora	19	10	2	7	35	25	+10	32
4	Coatzacoalcos	19	6	4	9	26	29	−3	22
5	Atlético Mexiquense	19	4	7	8	22	24	−2	19

Source: Ascenso MX and Soccerway
Rules for classification: 1st points; 2nd goal difference; 3rd goals scored; 4th head-to-head; 5th away goals scored; 6th draw

==== Group 4 ====
Pos	Team	Pld	W	D	L	GF	GA	GD	Pts
1	Chivas Coras	19	9	3	7	27	25	+2	30
2	Tijuana	19	5	8	6	26	26	0	23
3	Rayados A	19	5	4	10	32	35	−3	19
4	Irapuato	19	3	9	7	30	37	−7	18
5	Águilas Riviera Maya	19	4	6	9	15	24	−9	18

Source: Ascenso MX and Soccerway
Rules for classification: 1st points; 2nd goal difference; 3rd goals scored; 4th head-to-head; 5th away goals scored; 6th draw

=== General league table ===
Pos	Team	Pld	W	D	L	GF	GA	GD	Pts
1	Correcaminos UAT	19	12	4	3	38	20	+18	40
2	Cruz Azul Oaxaca	19	10	3	6	34	24	+10	33
3	Puebla	19	10	3	6	29	22	+7	33
4	Querétaro	19	10	3	6	23	17	+6	33
5	Coyotes de Sonora	19	10	2	7	35	25	+10	32
6	Indios	19	10	2	7	29	26	+3	32
7	Chivas Coras	19	9	3	7	27	25	+2	30
8	Tigres Mochis	19	8	3	8	32	29	+3	27
9	Durango	19	6	8	5	25	25	0	26
10	Tampico Madero	19	7	5	7	21	27	−6	26
11	León	19	6	7	6	30	28	+2	25
12	Tabasco	19	7	4	8	21	32	−11	25
13	Tijuana	19	5	8	6	26	26	0	23
14	Salamanca	19	6	5	8	21	28	−7	23
15	Coatzacoalcos	19	6	4	9	26	29	−3	22
16	Atlético Mexiquense	19	4	7	8	22	24	−2	19
17	Rayados A	19	5	4	10	32	35	−3	19
18	Lobos BUAP	19	5	4	10	24	37	−13	19
19	Irapuato	19	3	9	7	30	37	−7	18
20	Águilas Riviera Maya	19	4	6	9	15	24	−9	18

Source: Ascenso MX and Soccerway
Rules for classification: 1st points; 2nd goal difference; 3rd goals scored; 4th head-to-head; 5th away goals scored; 6th draw

=== Results ===
Home \ Away	ARM	AMX	CHV	COA	CYS	CRO	DUR	IND	IRA	LEO	LOB	PUE	RAY	SAL	QRO	TAB	TAM	TGR	TIJ	UAT
Águilas Riviera Maya		1–1	2–2		1–0		1–1	1–2	1–1		2–0		0–1	1–0					0–2	
At. Mexiquense				3–1				0–1		2–2		1–2			0–1	1–2	3–0	1–1		3–2
Chivas Coras		1–0		1–0		1–3	1–0		4–0	2–0	2–1		0–3			2–1		2–1		
Coatzacoalcos	2–1				0–1	5–2				3–2	2–0		1–1	0–0				0–2	2–1	
Coyotes Sonora		2–1	1–1				1–0	4–1	2–1		7–1	1–2	1–0		3–1		1–1			
Cruz Azul Oaxaca	2–0	0–0			5–1		4–2		1–1	2–4			2–1	3–0					2–1	
Durango		2–2		2–2				0–0	3–0			1–0			1–0	3–1	2–0			1–1
Indios			3–4	1–0		2–1				1–3		1–2			2–1	5–0	0–1	2–1		1–1
Irapuato		1–1		2–2				2–1		0–0		1–1			1–2	2–2	5–0			1–2
León	0–0				2–4	0–0	2–2				2–2		4–2	2–3				2–1	2–0	
Lobos BUAP		2–1					2–0	3–0	1–1			1–4	2–2		0–2		2–1		1–2	0–1
Puebla	2–0		4–2	2–1		2–1				1–2				0–1		0–1		1–0	2–2	1–1
Rayados A		1–2					6–1	2–4	2–4			0–1			1–3	3–1	2–0			0–2
Salamanca		0–0	2–1		1–2		0–2	0–1	4–3		3–1		2–2		2–1				0–0	
Querétaro	1–0		1–0	1–0		0–1				1–1		2–1				0–0	1–2	1–0		2–2
Tabasco	0–1			3–2	1–0	1–0				1–3	1–1			1–0				0–3	2–2	
Tampico Madero	0–0		0–0	2–3		1–0				2–1		3–1		1–1		1–2		1–0		3–1
Tigres Mochis	3–2				3–2	0–4	1–1		5–1		2–1		3–1	2–0					2–2	
Tijuana		2–0	2–1		2–1		1–1	0–1	3–3				2–2		0–1		2–2			
UAT	4–1		1–0	3–0	2–1	1–2				1–0				5–2		3–1		4–1	1–0	

Updated to match(es) played on 19 November 2005. Source: Ascenso MX
Legend: Blue = home team win; Yellow = draw; Red = away team win.

=== Reclasification series ===
Team 1	Agg.	Team 2	1st leg	2nd leg
Coyotes de Sonora	8–3	Tijuana	4–1	4–2
Indios	3–4	León	0–1	3–3

==== First leg ====
23 November 2005	Tijuana	1–4	Coyotes de Sonora	Tijuana
13:00	Garduño 57'	Report	da Souza 23'; Valdez 66'; Romero 83', 87'	Stadium: Unidad Deportiva CREA; Attendance: 100

24 November 2005	León	1-0	Indios	León
20:30	Pérez 10'	Report		Stadium: Estadio León; Attendance: 22,000

==== Second leg ====
26 November 2005	Coyotes de Sonora	4–2 (8-3 agg.)	Tijuana	Hermosillo
19:30	Romero 16', 80'; Gomes 62'; Valdez 87'	Report	Begines 23'; Borja 39'	Stadium: Estadio Héroe de Nacozari

27 November 2005	Indios	3–3 (3–4 agg.)	León	Ciudad Juárez
13:00	López 51'; Santibáñez 77'; Gutiérrez 83'	Report	Nurse 41'; Vázquez 73'; Rojas 90'	Stadium: Estadio Olímpico Benito Juárez; Attendance: 15,000

=== Liguilla ===
Quarter-finals
2	Cruz Azul Oaxaca (p.t.)	2	2	4
7	Durango	2	2	4
1	UAT	0	1	1
8	León	2	2	4
3	Puebla (p.t.)	1	2	3
6	Chivas Coras	2	1	3
4	Querétaro	1	2	3
5	Coyotes Sonora	2	2	4

Semi-finals
2	Cruz Azul Oaxaca	1	2	3
8	León	1	1	2
3	Puebla (p.t.)	1	1	2
5	Coyotes Sonora	2	0	2

Final
2	Cruz Azul Oaxaca	1	0	1
3	Puebla	1	1	2

- (p.t.) The team was classified by its position in the general table

==== Quarter-finals ====
Team 1	Agg.	Team 2	1st leg	2nd leg
Cruz Azul Oaxaca	4–4	Durango	2–2	2–2
UAT	1–4	León	0–2	1–2
Puebla	3–3	Chivas Coras	1–2	2–1
Querétaro	3–4	Coyotes Sonora	1–2	2–2

===== First leg =====
30 November 2005	Durango	2–2	Cruz Azul Oaxaca	Durango
20:00	Oliveira 50', 77'	Report	Gigena 66'; Fuentes 87'	Stadium: Estadio Francisco Zarco; Attendance: 6,500

30 November 2005	Coyotes de Sonora	2–1	Querétaro	Hermosillo
20:30	Romero 37'; Ortíz 68'	Report	Mejía 19'	Stadium: Estadio Héroe de Nacozari

30 November 2005	León	2–0	UAT	León
20:30	Nurse 44'; Márquez 79'	Report		Stadium: Estadio León; Attendance: 24,000

1 December 2005	Chivas Coras	2–1	Puebla	Tepic
20:30	Quiñones 53'; Estrada 69'	Report	Pérez 19'	Stadium: Estadio Nicolás Álvarez Ortega; Attendance: 7,500

===== Second leg =====
3 December 2005	Cruz Azul Oaxaca	2–2 (4–4 agg.)	Durango	Oaxaca
15:00	Campos 40'; Gigena 80'	Report	Ramos 37'; Oliveira 61'	Stadium: Estadio Benito Juárez; Attendance: 4,000

3 December 2005	Querétaro	2–2 (3–4 agg.)	Coyotes de Sonora	Querétaro
17:00	González 33', 60'	Report	Gómes 1'; Sousa 88'	Stadium: Estadio Corregidora; Attendance: 10,000

3 December 2005	UAT	1–2 (1–4 agg.)	León	Ciudad Victoria
20:00	Álvarez 83'	Report	Nurse 28'; Banda 48'	Stadium: Estadio Marte R. Gómez; Attendance: 18,000

4 December 2005	Puebla	2–1 (3–3 agg.)	Chivas Coras	Puebla
12:00	Mascorro 17'; Rey 85'	Report	Vela 65'	Stadium: Estadio Cuauhtémoc; Attendance: 20,000

==== Semi-finals ====
Team 1	Agg.	Team 2	1st leg	2nd leg
Cruz Azul Oaxaca	3–2	León	1–1	2–1
Puebla	3–3	Coyotes de Sonora	1–2	1–0

===== First leg =====
7 December 2005	León	1–1	Cruz Azul Oaxaca	León
20:30	Almirón 3'	Report	Gigena 57'	Stadium: Estadio León; Attendance: 20,000

8 December 2005	Coyotes de Sonora	2–1	Puebla	Hermosillo
20:30	Romero 29'; Gomes 87'	Report	de la Cruz 47'	Stadium: Estadio Héroe de Nacozari

===== Second leg =====
10 December 2005	Cruz Azul Oaxaca	2–1 (3–2 agg.)	León	Oaxaca
15:00	Gigena 28'; Pardini 90'	Report	Nurse 72'	Stadium: Estadio Benito Juárez

11 December 2005	Puebla	1–0 (3–3 agg.)	Coyotes de Sonora	Puebla
12:00	Orozco 2'	Report		Stadium: Estadio Cuauhtémoc; Attendance: 20,000

==== Final ====
Team 1	Agg.	Team 2	1st leg	2nd leg
Cruz Azul Oaxaca	1–2	Puebla	1–1	0–1

===== First leg =====
14 December 2005	Puebla	1–1	Cruz Azul Oaxaca	Puebla
20:30	Rincón 70'	Report	Gigena 77'	Stadium: Estadio Cuauhtémoc; Attendance: 30,000

===== Second leg =====
17 December 2005	Cruz Azul Oaxaca	0–1 (1–2 agg.)	Puebla	Oaxaca
15:00		Report	de la Barrera 73'	Stadium: Estadio Benito Juárez; Attendance: 8,000

Apertura 2005 winners

1st title

== Clausura 2006 ==
=== Group league tables ===
==== Group 1 ====
Pos	Team	Pld	W	D	L	GF	GA	GD	Pts
1	Correcaminos UAT	19	10	5	4	31	23	+8	35
2	Indios	19	8	6	5	29	17	+12	30
3	Tampico Madero	19	9	2	8	28	20	+8	29
4	Tigres Mochis	19	4	7	8	19	27	−8	19
5	Puebla	19	3	5	11	16	32	−16	14

Source: Ascenso MX and Soccerway
Rules for classification: 1st points; 2nd goal difference; 3rd goals scored; 4th head-to-head; 5th away goals scored; 6th draw

==== Group 2 ====
Pos	Team	Pld	W	D	L	GF	GA	GD	Pts
1	León	19	8	6	5	32	24	+8	30
2	Salamanca	19	8	6	5	22	18	+4	30
3	Lobos BUAP	19	8	3	8	28	30	−2	27
4	Durango	19	6	8	5	22	22	0	26
5	Tabasco	19	8	2	9	22	23	−1	26

Source: Ascenso MX and Soccerway
Rules for classification: 1st points; 2nd goal difference; 3rd goals scored; 4th head-to-head; 5th away goals scored; 6th draw

==== Group 3 ====
Pos	Team	Pld	W	D	L	GF	GA	GD	Pts
1	Querétaro	19	9	7	3	26	18	+8	34
2	Cruz Azul Oaxaca	19	8	7	4	27	21	+6	31
3	Atlético Mexiquense	19	8	3	8	27	27	0	27
4	Coatzacoalcos	19	6	4	9	22	28	−6	22
5	Coyotes de Sonora	19	4	7	8	24	27	−3	19

Source: Ascenso MX and Soccerway
Rules for classification: 1st points; 2nd goal difference; 3rd goals scored; 4th head-to-head; 5th away goals scored; 6th draw

==== Group 4 ====
Pos	Team	Pld	W	D	L	GF	GA	GD	Pts
1	Chivas Coras	19	9	5	5	19	14	+5	32
2	Rayados A	19	8	5	6	29	22	+7	29
3	Zacatepec	19	6	6	7	23	23	0	24
4	Irapuato	19	4	6	9	17	28	−11	18
5	Tijuana	19	4	4	11	13	32	−19	16

Source: Ascenso MX and Soccerway
Rules for classification: 1st points; 2nd goal difference; 3rd goals scored; 4th head-to-head; 5th away goals scored; 6th draw

=== General league table ===
Pos	Team	Pld	W	D	L	GF	GA	GD	Pts
1	Correcaminos UAT	19	10	5	4	31	23	+8	35
2	Querétaro	19	9	7	3	26	18	+8	34
3	Chivas Coras	19	9	5	5	19	14	+5	32
4	Cruz Azul Oaxaca	19	8	7	4	27	21	+6	31
5	León	19	8	6	5	32	24	+8	30
6	Salamanca	19	8	6	5	22	18	+4	30
7	Indios	19	8	6	5	29	17	+12	30
8	Tampico Madero	19	9	2	8	28	20	+8	29
9	Rayados A	19	8	5	6	29	22	+7	29
10	Atlético Mexiquense	19	8	3	8	27	27	0	27
11	Lobos BUAP	19	8	3	8	28	30	−2	27
12	Durango	19	6	8	5	22	22	0	26
13	Tabasco	19	8	2	9	22	23	−1	26
14	Zacatepec	19	6	6	7	23	23	0	24
15	Coatzacoalcos	19	6	4	9	22	28	−6	22
16	Coyotes de Sonora	19	4	7	8	24	27	−3	19
17	Tigres Mochis	19	4	7	8	19	27	−8	19
18	Irapuato	19	4	6	9	17	28	−11	18
19	Tijuana	19	4	4	11	13	32	−19	16
20	Puebla	19	3	5	11	16	32	−16	14

Source: Ascenso MX and Soccerway
Rules for classification: 1st points; 2nd goal difference; 3rd goals scored; 4th head-to-head; 5th away goals scored; 6th draw

=== Results ===
Home \ Away	ZAC	AMX	CHV	COA	CYS	CRO	DUR	IND	IRA	LEO	LOB	PUE	RAY	SAL	QRO	TAB	TAM	TGR	TIJ	UAT
Zacatepec				1–0		1–2				2–2		2–0			0–0	1–0	1–3	3–1		2–1
At. Mexiquense	0–2		1–2		2–1	2–2	3–0		3–0		1–0		3–0	1–1					3–1	
Chivas Coras	1–1				0–0			4–0				0–1		1–0	1–0				1–0	2–0
Coatzacoalcos		2–0	3–1				1–1	1–0	2–1			2–1			0–2	0–2	0–0			0–0
Coyotes Sonora	2–2			2–1		4–0				3–4				0–1		0–1		1–1	2–0	0–2
Cruz Azul Oaxaca			0–0	2–0				1–1		2–1		3–1			1–1	0–1	2–0	4–2		3–1
Durango	2–2		2–3		2–0	2–1				0–0	1–0		1–1	1–1				1–0	2–0	
Indios	1–0	2–1			1–1		2–0		0–1		5–2		2–0	0–0					0–1	
Irapuato	3–2		0–0		1–1	2–1	1–1				2–1		0–1	1–2				1–1	0–0	
León		1–0	0–1	3–0				2–1	1–0			2–2		4–1	2–2		2–0			0–1
Lobos BUAP	1–0		2–0		3–1	2–2				3–3				2–1		1–0		1–0		
Puebla		0–1			1–0		2–3	1–1	2–2		1–1		0–3		2–1		1–4			
Rayados A	2–1		1–0	4–2	1–1	0–0				2–0	3–0			0–1				1–1	4–0	
Salamanca	2–0					0–1				1–1		1–0					1–3	1–0		0–0
Querétaro		2–2			2–3			1–1	2–1		2–0		1–0	2–1					3–2	
Tabasco		4–0	0–3				2–1	2–4	3–0			2–0	1–1		1–2		0–1			0–2
Tampico Madero		0–1	1–0		1–1		2–1	0–1	3–0		2–3		2–0		0–1				4–1	
Tigres Mochis		2–1	2–0	2–2				0–4		2–1		1–1			0–1	0–0	1–2			2–2
Tijuana	0–0			1–4		0–0				0–2	2–1	1–0		1–1		0–1		0–1		3–1
UAT		3–2					1–1	3–1	2–1		4–2	2–0	4–3		1–1		1–0			

Updated to match(es) played on 22 April 2006. Source: Ascenso MX
Legend: Blue = home team win; Yellow = draw; Red = away team win.

=== Reclasification series ===
Team 1	Agg.	Team 2	1st leg	2nd leg
Tampico Madero	0–2	Rayados A	0–1	0–1

==== First leg ====
26 April 2006	Rayados A	1–0	Tampico Madero	Santiago, Nuevo León
16:00	del Real 6'	Report		Stadium: Estadio El Barrial; Attendance: 300; Referee: Luis Carlos Velázquez Benítez

==== Second leg ====
29 April 2006	Tampico Madero	0–1 (0–2 agg.)	Rayados A	Tampico - Ciudad Madero
21:00		Report		Stadium: Estadio Tamaulipas; Attendance: 18,000; Referee: Jaime Herrera Garduño

=== Liguilla ===
Quarter-finals
3	Querétaro	1	2	3
6	Salamanca	1	1	2
4	Cruz Azul Oaxaca (p.t.)	2	1	3
5	León	2	1	3
1	Correcaminos UAT	2	2	4
8	Rayados A	0	0	0
2	Chivas Coras	0	1	1
7	Indios	0	3	3

Semi-finals
3	Querétaro	1	3	4
4	Cruz Azul Oaxaca	2	0	2
1	Correcaminos UAT	1	1	2
7	Indios	1	2	3

Final
3	Querétaro (pen.)	1	2	3
7	Indios	2	1	3

- (p.t.) The team was classified by its position in the general table

==== Quarter-finals ====
Team 1	Agg.	Team 2	1st leg	2nd leg
Querétaro	3–2	Salamanca	1–1	2–1
Cruz Azul Oaxaca	3–3	León	2–2	1–1
Correcaminos UAT	4–0	Rayados A	2–0	2–0
Chivas Coras	1–3	Indios	0–0	1–3

===== First leg =====
3 May 2006	Rayados A	0–2	Correcaminos UAT	Santiago, Nuevo León
16:00		Report	Silva 7'; Giménez 70'	Stadium: Estadio El Barrial; Attendance: 1,000; Referee: Fabián Delgado Horcasitas

3 May 2006	Salamanca	1–1	Querétaro	Salamanca
16:00	Rodríguez 65'	Report	Gerk 19'	Stadium: Estadio Olímpico Sección 24; Attendance: 6,000; Referee: Sergio Fernando Silva Rigau

4 May 2006	Indios	0–0	Chivas Coras	Ciudad Juárez
20:00		Report		Stadium: Estadio Olímpico Benito Juárez; Attendance: 16,000; Referee: Jesús Fabricio Morales Bojorquez

4 May 2006	León	2–2	Cruz Azul Oaxaca	León
20:30	Gandín 15'; Almirón 54'	Report	Gómez 83'; Cáceres 88'	Stadium: Estadio León; Attendance: 22,000; Referee: José Ángel Figueroa Cárdenas

===== Second leg =====
6 May 2006	Querétaro	2–1 (3–2 agg.)	Salamanca	Querétaro
20:00	Frontán 37'; Gerk 59'	Report	Enríquez 15'	Stadium: Estadio Corregidora; Attendance: 20,000; Referee: Jorge Macías Romo

6 May 2006	Correcaminos UAT	2–0 (4–0 agg.)	Rayados A	Ciudad Victoria
20:00	González 18'; Vega 58'	Report		Stadium: Estadio Marte R. Gómez; Attendance: 18,000; Referee: Roberto García Orozco

7 May 2006	Chivas Coras	1–3 (1–3 agg.)	Indios	Tepic
16:00		Report		Stadium: Estadio Nicolás Álvarez Ortega; Attendance: 2,500

7 May 2006	Cruz Azul Oaxaca	1–1 (3–3 agg.)	León	Oaxaca
17:00		Report	Nurse 40'	Stadium: Estadio Benito Juárez; Attendance: 10,000

==== Semi-finals ====
Team 1	Agg.	Team 2	1st leg	2nd leg
Querétaro	4–2	Cruz Azul Oaxaca	1–2	3–0
Correcaminos UAT	2–3	Indios	1–1	1–2

===== First leg =====
10 May 2006	Cruz Azul Oaxaca	2–1	Querétaro	Oaxaca
17:00		Report		Stadium: Estadio Benito Juárez; Attendance: 3,000

10 May 2006	Indios	1–1	Correcaminos UAT	Ciudad Juárez
20:00		Report		Stadium: Estadio Olímpico Benito Juárez; Attendance: 16,000

===== Second leg =====
13 May 2006	Correcaminos UAT	1–2 (2–3 agg.)	Indios	Ciudad Victoria
20:00		Report		Stadium: Estadio Marte R. Gómez; Attendance: 18,000

13 May 2006	Querétaro	3–0 (4–2 agg.)	Cruz Azul Oaxaca	Querétaro
20:00		Report		Stadium: Estadio Corregidora; Attendance: 30,000

==== Final ====
Team 1	Agg.	Team 2	1st leg	2nd leg
Querétaro (pen.)	3–3	Indios	1–2	2–1

===== First leg =====
17 May 2006	Indios	2–1	Querétaro	Ciudad Juárez
20:00		Report		Stadium: Estadio Olímpico Benito Juárez; Attendance: 25,000

===== Second leg =====
20 May 2006	Querétaro	2–1 (3–3 agg.) (4–3 p)	Indios	Querétaro
20:00	de Oliveira 26'; Guerra 79'	Report	Saucedo 17'	Stadium: Estadio Corregidora; Attendance: 40,000; Referee: Germán Arredondo

Clausura 2006 winners

2nd title

== Relegation table ==
Pos.	Team	Pld.	Pts.	Ave.	GD
16.	Puebla	38	47	1.2368	-9
17.	Lobos BUAP	76	94	1.2368	-17
18.	Zacatepec	114	139	1.2193	-39
19.	Irapuato	114	138	1.2105	-12
20.	Tijuana	114	123	1.0789	-44

== Campeón de Ascenso 2006 ==
The Promotion Final faced Puebla against Querétaro to determine the winner of the First Division Promotion. Querétaro was the winner.

Team 1	Agg.	Team 2	1st leg	2nd leg
Querétaro	5–1	Puebla	2–1	3–0

=== First leg ===
25 May 2006	Puebla	1–2	Querétaro	Puebla
20:45		Report		Stadium: Estadio Cuauhtémoc; Attendance: 40,000

=== Second leg ===
28 May 2006	Querétaro	3–0 (5–1 agg.)	Puebla	Querétaro
20:00	Frontán 16'; Gerk 22'; Carrasco 47'	Report		Stadium: Estadio Corregidora; Attendance: 40,000; Referee: Mauricio Morales Ovalle

Champions

1st title
