= Héctor Giménez =

Héctor Giménez may refer to:

- Héctor Giménez (baseball) (born 1982), Venezuelan professional baseball catcher
- Héctor Giménez (footballer) (born 1975), Uruguayan-Mexican football striker
