= Carlos Pinto =

Carlos Pinto may refer to:

- Carlos Pinto (journalist), Chilean journalist and television presenter
- Carlos Pinto (equestrian), Portuguese Olympic dressage rider
- Carlos Pinto (Portuguese footballer) (born 1973), Portuguese football manager and former midfielder
- Carlos Mota Pinto, Portuguese professor and politician
- Carlos Maia Pinto, Prime Minister of Portugal, 1921
- Carlos Pinto (Mexican footballer) (born 1985), Mexican football defender
