= Alejandro Corona =

Mexican footballer (born 1976)

Personal information
- Full name: Alejandro Corona Cervantes
- Date of birth: 26 June 1976 (age 50)
- Place of birth: Pachuca, Hidalgo, Mexico
- Height: 1.72 m (5 ft 8 in)
- Position: Midfielder

Team information
- Current team: León (women) (Manager)

Youth career
- Pachuca

Senior career*
Years	Team	Apps	(Gls)
1996–1998	Pachuca 'B'	33	(3)
1998–1999	Gallos de Aguascalientes	27	(4)
1999–2000	Cruz Azul Hidalgo	23	(2)
2000–2006	Cruz Azul	110	(15)
2006–2007	Chiapas	49	(2)
2008–2009	Veracruz	9	(0)
2009	Correcaminos	23	(1)
2010–2011	León	57	(5)

Managerial career
- 2014–2016: León Reserves and Academy
- 2016–2018: León (Assistant)
- 2018–2022: León Reserves and Academy
- 2023–: León (women)
- 2026: León (interim)
- * Club domestic league appearances and goals

Alejandro Corona Cervantes (born 26 June 1976) is a former Mexican professional footballer. He last played for Club León in the Liga de Ascenso. In March 2026 he served as interim coach of Club León following the resignation of Ignacio Ambriz.

== Career ==
Born in Pachuca, Corona began playing football with Pachuca's reserve team in the Segunda División de México. The club disbanded and he joined Gallos de Aguascalientes which he helped gain promotion to the Primera A. Then, Cruz Azul Hidalgo signed him.

Corona made his Mexican Primera División debut at age 25 with Cruz Azul in 2000. He would also play for Chiapas, Tiburones Rojos de Veracruz and Correcaminos UAT before signing with Club León at age 33. He retired from playing at age 35, and became the youth coach of Esmeraldas de León.
