= Ángel Saavedra (footballer) =

Mexican footballer (born 2006)

Personal information
- Full name: Ángel Antonio Saavedra Nevárez
- Date of birth: 13 June 2003 (age 23)
- Place of birth: Torreón, Coahuila, Mexico
- Height: 1.71 m (5 ft 7 in)
- Position: Central midfielder

Team information
- Current team: Cruz Azul Hidalgo
- Number: 63

Youth career
- 2022–2025: Mazatlán

Senior career*
Years	Team	Apps	(Gls)
2022–2026	Mazatlán	15	(0)
2026–	Cruz Azul Hidalgo	11	(1)
- * Club domestic league appearances and goals as of 31 October 2026

Ángel Antonio Saavedra Nevárez (born 13 June 2003) is a Mexican professional footballer who plays as a central midfielder for Liga de Expansión MX club Cruz Azul Hidalgo.

== Club career ==
Saavedra began his career at the academy of Mazatlán, where he made his professional debut on 16 December 2022 in a 0–1 Copa por México match against Guadalajara, being subbed in at the 73rd minute. On 29 May 2025, he made his Liga MX debut in a 3–2 win against Atlas, being subbed in at the 86th minute.

== Career statistics ==
As of match played on 31 October 2026

Appearances and goals by club, season and competition
Club	Season	League			Cup		Continental		Other		Total	
Club	Season	Division	Apps	Goals	Apps	Goals	Apps	Goals	Apps	Goals	Apps	Goals
Mazatlán	2022–23	Liga MX	—		1 (Note: Appearance in 2022 Copa por México)	0	—		—		1	0
Mazatlán	2024–25	Liga MX	2	0	—		—		—		2	0
Mazatlán	2025–26	Liga MX	13	0	—		—		1 (Note: Appearances in Leagues Cup)	0	14	0
Mazatlán	Total		15	0	1	0	—		1	0	17	0
Cruz Azul Hidalgo	2026–27	Liga de Expansión MX	11	1	—		—		—		11	1
Career total			26	1	1	0	0	0	1	0	28	1
