= Carlos Pinto (Mexican footballer) =

Mexican footballer (born 1985)

Personal information
- Full name: Carlos Heriberto Pinto Rosas
- Date of birth: 7 August 1985 (age 41)
- Place of birth: Culiacán, Sinaloa, Mexico
- Height: 1.67 m (5 ft 5 1/2 in)
- Position: Defender

Team information
- Current team: Tijuana U-19 (Manager)

Senior career*
Years	Team	Apps	(Gls)
2005	Alacranes de Durango	2	(0)
2005–2008	Dorados de Sinaloa	80	(4)
2006	→ Dorados de Tijuana (loan)	16	(0)
2008–2010	Querétaro	63	(6)
2011	Veracruz	16	(0)
2011	Irapuato	12	(0)
2012–2017	Dorados de Sinaloa	105	(1)
2013–2014	→Delfines (loan)	27	(1)

Managerial career
- 2018–2019: Sinaloa Reserves and Academy
- 2020–2025: Sinaloa (Assistant)
- 2025–2026: Tijuana (assistant)
- 2026–: Tijuana Reserves and Academy
- * Club domestic league appearances and goals

Carlos Heriberto Pinto Rosas (born 7 August 1985) is a Mexican former professional footballer who last played for Sinaloa of Liga MX.
