= Jorge Vantolrá =

Mexican football manager (born 1955)

Personal information
- Full name: Jorge Humberto Vantolrá Rangel
- Date of birth: 16 November 1955 (age 70)
- Place of birth: Mexico City, Mexico
- Height: 1.71 m (5 ft 7 in)

Managerial career
- Years: Team
- 1997: Mexico U17
- 1999: Coyotes de Saltillo
- 2003–2004: Estudiantes de Altamira
- 2005: Delfines de Coatzacoalcos
- 2005: Santos Laguna
- 2006: Tigres Mochis
- 2007: Monarcas Morelia A
- 2009: Correcaminos UAT
- 2018: Atlético Saltillo Soccer

Jorge Humberto Vantolrá Rangel (born 16 November 1955) is a Mexican football manager and current manager of Atlético Saltillo Soccer of Liga Premier de México.

== Career ==
Vantolrá Rangel never played professional football. Vantolrá was born in the capital city of Mexico. Initially, he was an educational psychologist and in the years 1976–1991 he trained school teams in private institutions Instituto México and Universidad Iberoamericana. In 1984 he became the coach of the Club Universidad Nacional junior team and held this position for the next seven years, after which he became a member of the C.F. Monterrey junior team coaching staff. There he worked in 1991–1994 and 1997–1999, in the meantime being an advisor to the youth academy of the Tecos UAG club. In these teams he cooperated with leading trainers in Mexico - in Pumas and Monterrey with Miguel Mejía Barón, while in Tecos with Víctor Manuel Vucetich. In addition, in 1993 he was assistant to Ricardo Ferretti in the Mexican team B, who then took part in the CONCACAF Gold Cup, eventually triumphing in it. He also played the role of midfielder in the first representation of Mexico - Miguel Mejía Barón during successful elimination to the FIFA 1994 World Cup, but Bora Milutinović in qualifying for the 1998 FIFA World Cup, which the Mexicans also got.

In 1997, Vantolrá led the Mexican U-17 team at the World Championships in Egypt. There his players recorded a victory and two defeats, taking the penultimate place in the group stage and did not advance to the quarterfinals. Later he coached the second-team Coyotes de Saltillo, in 2003 he briefly dealt with the C.F. Pachuca juniors, and after a few months he took the post of the second-class Estudiantes de Santander. In the years 2004–2005 he worked in Delfines de Coatzacoalcos, also from the second league, but in the autumn games of Aperture 2005 for a few weeks he was the supervisor of the first-league Club Santos Laguna. During this time, he and his team from Torreón won and two defeats in three meetings.

In the autumn of 2006, Vantolrá coached a second-class branch of Tigres UANL called Tigres Mochis, but in 2007–1009 he was a training instructor and juniors of the Monarcas Morelia team. During the autumn season, Apertura 2009 became the guardian of the second division team Correcaminos UAT, but he left the post after two wins and four defeats, including the function of junior coach of this club from the city of Ciudad Victoria, which he served for the next three years. In December 2012, he returned to Pumas UNAM, this time as the director of the football club academy.
