= 1951–52 Mexican Segunda División season =

Segunda División de México
- Season: 1951–52
- Champions: La Piedad (1st title)
- Matches: 90
- Goals: 328 (3.64 per match)
- Top goalscorer: Ricardo Zárate (21 goals)

The 1951-52 Segunda División de México season was the second tournament in this competition. It counted with the participation of ten teams. La Piedad was the winner.

== Teams ==
1951-52 Season Teams

| Team | City | Stadium |
|---|---|---|
| Irapuato F.C. | Irapuato, Guanajuato | Revolución |
| La Concepción | Puebla, Puebla | Parque El Mirador |
| La Piedad | La Piedad, Michoacán | Campo Santa Ana Pacueco |
| Moctezuma | Orizaba, Veracruz | Moctezuma |
| C.D. Morelia | Morelia, Michoacán | Campo Morelia |
| C.F. Pachuca | Pachuca, Hidalgo | Campo Margarito Ramírez |
| Querétaro F.C. | Querétaro, Querétaro | Municipal de Querétaro |
| San Sebastián | León, Guanajuato | La Martinica |
| Deportivo Toluca | Toluca, State of Mexico | Campo Patria |
| C.D. Zamora | Zamora, Michoacán | Campo Juan Carreño |

== League standings ==
| Pos | Team | Pld | W | D | L | GF | GA | GD | Pts |
|---|---|---|---|---|---|---|---|---|---|
| 1 | La Piedad (C) | 18 | 10 | 5 | 3 | 37 | 21 | +16 | 25 |
| 2 | San Sebastián | 18 | 9 | 4 | 5 | 50 | 28 | +22 | 22 |
| 3 | Toluca | 18 | 8 | 5 | 5 | 44 | 34 | +10 | 21 |
| 4 | La Concepción | 18 | 8 | 4 | 6 | 36 | 22 | +14 | 20 |
| 5 | Irapuato | 18 | 5 | 8 | 5 | 29 | 26 | +3 | 18 |
| 6 | Zamora | 18 | 5 | 8 | 5 | 27 | 27 | 0 | 18 |
| 7 | Morelia | 18 | 7 | 4 | 7 | 33 | 39 | −6 | 18 |
| 8 | Moctezuma | 18 | 7 | 3 | 8 | 32 | 31 | +1 | 17 |
| 9 | Querétaro | 18 | 4 | 7 | 7 | 19 | 34 | −15 | 15 |
| 10 | Pachuca | 18 | 3 | 0 | 15 | 21 | 66 | −45 | 6 |

Source: rsssf.com
(C) Champions

== Results ==
| Home \ Away | IRA | LCO | LAP | MOC | MOR | PAC | QRO | SEB | TOL | ZAM |
|---|---|---|---|---|---|---|---|---|---|---|
| Irapuato | — | 2–2 | 1–1 | 3–0 | 2–0 | 3–1 | 0–2 | 3–2 | 1–1 | 1–1 |
| La Concepción | 2–0 | — | 1–2 | 2–1 | 5–1 | 5–1 | 4–1 | 2–2 | 1–1 | 3–1 |
| La Piedad | 3–3 | 1–0 | — | 6–2 | 4–0 | 0–1 | 1–1 | 1–1 | 1–1 | 2–1 |
| Moctezuma | 0–0 | 1–0 | 1–2 | — | 0–1 | 5–0 | 3–0 | 5–3 | 4–3 | 3–1 |
| Morelia | 2–1 | 1–2 | 3–1 | 1–1 | — | 3–1 | 1–1 | 1–3 | 4–1 | 5–1 |
| Pachuca | 1–0 | 2–5 | 1–6 | 2–3 | 3–4 | — | 2–1 | 0–4 | 3–9 | 0–3 |
| Querétaro | 1–1 | 1–0 | 1–2 | 1–0 | 2–2 | 2–1 | — | 1–1 | 0–0 | 2–2 |
| San Sebastián | 3–2 | 2–1 | 1–2 | 1–0 | 6–1 | 8–1 | 8–1 | — | 3–2 | 0–0 |
| Toluca | 3–5 | 2–0 | 1–2 | 2–0 | 5–3 | 3–1 | 3–1 | 3–1 | — | 5–4 |
| Zamora | 1–1 | 1–1 | 1–0 | 3–3 | 0–0 | 2–0 | 3–0 | 2–1 | 0–0 | — |

Updated to match(es) played on 27 January 1952. Source: RSSSF
Legend: Blue = home team win; Yellow = draw; Red = away team win.

== Moves ==
- La Piedad was promoted to First Division.
- Veracruz was relegated from First Division.
- After this season Atlético Veracruz; Cuautla; Estrella Roja and Monterrey joined the league.
- Pachuca was dissolved
