= Rubén Gigena =

Argentine footballer

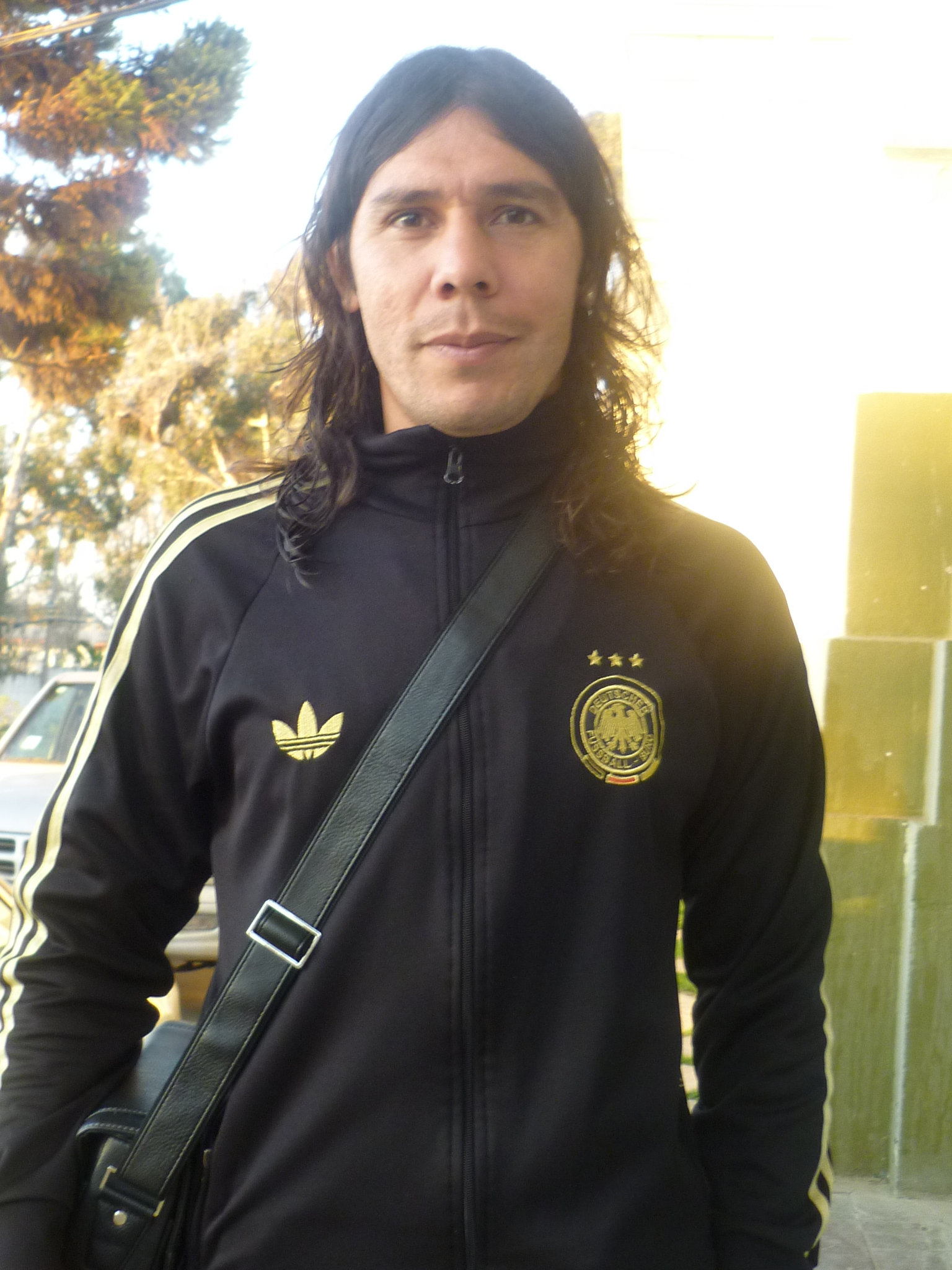

Personal information
- Full name: Rubén Darío Gigena
- Date of birth: October 2, 1980 (age 46)
- Place of birth: Bahía Blanca, Argentina
- Height: 1.86 m (6 ft 1 in)
- Position: Forward

Senior career*
Years	Team	Apps	(Gls)
1999–2002	Newell's Old Boys	43	(7)
2002–2003	The Strongest	48	(41)
2004	Libertad	3	(0)
2004–2006	Cruz Azul Oaxaca	79	(52)
2006–2007	Indios	27	(8)
2007	Cerro Porteño	1	(1)
2008	Sportivo Luqueño	19	(12)
2008–2009	Audax Italiano	28	(16)
2009–2010	Al Qadisiyah		
2010–2011	Santiago Wanderers	27	(6)
2011–2012	Deportes Iquique	17	(3)
2012–2013	Unión Villa Krause	21	(13)
2013–2014	Sol de América	23	(12)
2014–2015	Tiro Federal	11	(1)
- * Club domestic league appearances and goals

Rubén Darío Gigena (born 2 October 1980 in Bahía Blanca, province of Buenos Aires) is a retired Argentine football forward.

== Career ==
His former club include Newell's Old Boys in Argentina, Bolivian side The Strongest, Libertad, Cerro Porteño and Club Sportivo Luqueño from Paraguay, besides Cruz Azul Oaxaca and Indios de Ciudad Juárez in Mexico and Chilean clubs Santiago Wanderers and Deportes Iquique.
