= Cruz Azul Oaxaca =

Defunct reserve football team of Cruz Azul based in Oaxaca, Mexico

- Full name: Club Deportivo Cruz Azul Oaxaca
- Nicknames: La Máquina (The Machine); Los Celestes (The Sky-Blues); Los Cementeros (The Cement Makers); Las Liebres (The Hares)
- Short name: CAZ
- Founded: 2003; 23 years ago
- Dissolved: 2006; 20 years ago
- Ground: Estadio Benito Juárez
- Capacity: 12,500
- Owner: Cooperativa La Cruz Azul
- Website: cfcruzazul.com
Home colours	Away colours

Club Deportivo Cruz Azul Oaxaca, also known as Cruz Azul Oaxaca, was a professional football club in Mexico that last played in the Primera División "A". The club served as a reserve team for Cruz Azul and was based at the Estadio Benito Juárez in Oaxaca, Oaxaca.

== History ==
At the end of the Verano 2003 tournament, Cruz Azul's board decided to relocate its reserve team, Cruz Azul Hidalgo, to Oaxaca de Juárez, Oaxaca, rebranding it as Cruz Azul Oaxaca. The team played its home games at the Estadio Benito Juárez.

The club remained in Primera División "A" for three years. Its best campaign came during the Apertura 2005 tournament, when it reached the final and finished as runners-up, losing the title to Puebla. As a result, they missed out on a chance to compete for promotion to Mexico's top tier.

Following the Clausura 2006, the franchise was relocated back to Hidalgo, where it resumed the name Cruz Azul Hidalgo for the Apertura 2006 tournament.

== Stadium ==
Estadio Benito Juárez was the home ground of Cruz Azul Oaxaca until the team's relocation to Ciudad Cooperativa Cruz Azul in Hidalgo. The stadium had a capacity of 12,500 seated spectators. Over time, it also served as the home venue for clubs such as Chapulineros de Oaxaca and Alebrijes de Oaxaca.

== Honours ==
- Primera División "A"
  - Runners-up: Apertura 2005
- Tercera División de México
  - Runners-up: 1992–93
