= C.F. La Piedad =

Association football club in Mexico

La Piedad
- Full name: Club de Fútbol La Piedad
- Nickname: Los Reboceros (The Shawl Makers)
- Founded: 12 November 1951; 75 years ago (as Club La Piedad)
- Ground: Estadio Juan N. López; La Piedad, Michoacán
- Capacity: 13,356
- Owner: Martín Eduardo González Morales
- Chairman: Martín Eduardo González Morales
- Manager: Gastón Obledo
- League: Liga Premier (Primera Premier)
- 2025–26: Liga Premier (Serie A); Regular phase: 12th (Group I); Final phase: Did not qualify
| Home colours | Away colours |

Club de Fútbol La Piedad is a Mexican football club based in La Piedad, Michoacán. The club currently plays in the Primera Premier, the main branch of the Liga Premier de México, the third level division of Mexican football. Reboceros was founded in 1951 by football players from "Perros Bravos" neighborhood, most of them were craftsman working with leather and textile.

== History ==
=== First years of the club ===
The club was founded on November 12, 1951 in La Piedad, Michoacán. In 1952, the team won the Segunda División tournament and was promoted to the Primera División de México, however, the squad was relegated in 1953. After its relegation in 1953, the team would spend several years playing in the Segunda División de México and the Primera División 'A' de México. In 2001, the club won the Verano 2001 championship defeating Toros Neza. Later, La Piedad won the promotion to the Primera División by winning against Gallos de Aguascalientes in the promotion playoff.

=== Return to Primera División and first disappearance of the club ===
La Piedad returned to the Primera División in the Invierno 2001 tournament, the team finished in 18th place with 19 points. In the Verano 2002 tournament, La Piedad finished the regular season in the first place of the general table. Being eliminated by Pumas UNAM in the quarterfinals, the team was managed by Víctor Manuel Vucetich.

During the season, the team had to face criticism from own players, rival teams and the media, which accused the club and the city of not having the facilities or adequate urban infrastructure for the Primera División. Finally, the team was relocated to the city of Querétaro and merged with the Querétaro franchise.

The original La Piedad franchise was dissolved in 2004 after the Federación Mexicana de Fútbol (FMF) decided to reduce the number of participants in the Primera División to 18 clubs. The FMF bought the Querétaro franchise for the lack of transparency regarding the origin of its financial resources and decided to disappear it for a while.

=== Ascenso MX teams ===
After the original La Piedad team was relocated to the city of Querétaro, a new franchise arrived to the city of La Piedad: Tampico Madero was relocated to La Piedad, Michoacán and adopted the name and colors of Reboceros on the Invierno 2002 tournament. The new La Piedad franchise arrived to the tournament final against Irapuato, finally, Irapuato won the championship, and in January 2003, La Piedad was relocated to Celaya, Guanajuato and was renamed as Cajeteros del Celaya.

In 2004, Guadalajara decided to relocate its reserve squad (Club Deportivo Tapatío) to La Piedad and rename it as Chivas La Piedad. However, the team only played for one season in the city, because they did not receive the sufficient support of local fans. In July 2005, the franchise was relocated to Tepic, Nayarit and renamed as Chivas Coras.

In June 2009, an Ascenso MX football club from the neighboring state of Guanajuato, Petroleros de Salamanca, was relocated to La Piedad and merged with the franchise. The club changed its name to Club de Fútbol La Piedad, and four years later the club was promoted to the Primera División de México after defeating Neza F.C. in a promotion play-off. The club had asked permission to relocate from La Piedad before the new season began. The club was subsequently relocated to the city of Veracruz when Fidel Kuri Grajales, the owner from Veracruz decided to liquidate the club to use its Primera División license for their Ascenso MX team Tiburones Rojos de Veracruz.

=== Segunda División teams ===
La Piedad maintained a reserve team in Silao, Guanajuato, this team played in Liga de Nuevos Talentos, the Reboceritos de La Piedad, this squad was relocated to La Piedad and became the main team in July 2013.

In June 2016, La Piedad bought an expansion place in the Liga Premier de Ascenso. The new team, officially called Club de Fútbol Reboceros was the product of an alliance between the City Council and football players Flavio and Duilio Davino.

In 2017, the Davino brothers sold their participation in the club, which was acquired by José Trinidad Melgoza, a local businessman. In the Clausura 2018, La Piedad was a finalist of the championship, being defeated by Loros UdeC.

In June 2018, new members arrived to the board that administers the club, the brothers Carlos Adrián and Ramón Morales. Melgoza left the direction and took his project to Real Zamora, a team from the same region as La Piedad.

Under the new directive, the team began to suffer several economic debts and financial problems, and finally in December 2018, Melgoza returned to Reboceros acquiring 90% of the team, the remaining 10% of the shares belong to the city of La Piedad. With the second stage of Melgoza, Reboceros de La Piedad and Real Zamora went to share the same ownership, for this reason a collaboration between both clubs began, which consisted mainly of the exchange of players and staff of the two teams with the aim of creating a project to promote regional football.

In July 2020, Melgoza relocated the franchise to Morelia, Michoacán and sold it to Promotora Deportiva Valladolid, a group of businessmen headed by Heriberto Morales and José Alfredo Pérez Ferrer. Pérez Ferrer was appointed as President of the club, while Claudio da Silva was elected as Vice President. La Piedad's project was merged with one that intended to bring a team to Morelia after the departure of Monarcas Morelia to Mazatlán, Sinaloa, however, upon winning another offer, it was decided to combine both. For this reason, Marco Antonio Figueroa and Carlos Bustos were chosen as sports advisers for La Piedad.

In May 2022, Martín Eduardo González Morales became the majority shareholder and president of the team. The new project focused on improving the club's financial situation and having a closer relationship with the local population.

== Honours ==
=== National ===
- Ascenso MX: (2)

Verano 2001, Apertura 2012

- Campeón de Ascenso: (2)

2001-02, 2012–13

- Segunda División Profesional: (1)

1951-1952

- Segunda División "B": (2)

1984-1985, 1993-1994

== Current squad ==
=== First-team squad ===
As of August 28, 2026

Note: Flags indicate national team as defined under FIFA eligibility rules; some limited exceptions apply. Players may hold more than one non-FIFA nationality.

| No. | Pos. | Nation | Player |
|---|---|---|---|
| 2 | DF | MEX | Ángel Corrales |
| 3 | DF | MEX | José de Jesús Torres |
| 9 | FW | MEX | Rogelio Alemán |
| 11 | FW | MEX | Rafael Aranda |
| 13 | DF | MEX | Rubén Raya |
| 14 | DF | MEX | Adrián Adame |
| 15 | DF | MEX | Juan José Zamudio |
| 16 | MF | MEX | Sergio Ochoa |
| 17 | MF | MEX | Édgar Rodríguez |
| 18 | FW | MEX | Jorge Marín |
| 19 | FW | MEX | Josué Muñoz |
| 20 | DF | USA | Yahir González |
| 21 | FW | MEX | Diego Alvarado |

| No. | Pos. | Nation | Player |
|---|---|---|---|
| 22 | DF | MEX | Diego Sánchez |
| 23 | DF | MEX | César Quiróz |
| 24 | GK | MEX | Alfredo González |
| 25 | MF | MEX | Jesús Villanueva |
| 26 | MF | MEX | Omar Vidaña |
| 27 | FW | MEX | Carlos Zorrilla |
| 29 | FW | MEX | Jonatan Escobar |
| 30 | GK | MEX | Paulo Aranda |
| 31 | DF | MEX | Édgar Zavala |
| 35 | DF | USA | Axel Casasola |
| 36 | DF | MEX | Alfredo Hernández |
| 37 | FW | MEX | Jesús Torres |
| 42 | FW | MEX | Christopher Cortés |

== Notable players ==
- (Brazil) Claudinho da Silva
- (Chile) Felipe Flores
- (Costa Rica) Rolando Fonseca
- (Costa Rica) Óscar Emilio Rojas
- (Ecuador) Iván Hurtado
- (Mexico) Francisco Fonseca
- (Mexico) Rafael Medina
- (Mexico) Christian Patiño
- (Uruguay) Daniel Rosello
- (Mexico) Ramón Morales
- (Mexico) Arturo Magaña

== Managers ==
- (Uruguay) Jorge Enrique Correa (July 2010–Aug 10)
- (Mexico) Antonio Ascencio Meza (Sept 2010–Dec 10)
- (Mexico) Marco Trejo (Jan 2011–March 11)
- (Mexico) Cristóbal Ortega (July 2011–May 13)
