= Daniel Rossello =

Uruguayan footballer and manager (born 1972)

Daniel Rossello Sambaino (born February 20, 1972, in Montevideo), known as Daniel Rossello, is a Uruguayan football manager and former player.
