= Paulo Serafín =

Mexican footballer (born 1975)

Personal information
- Full name: Paulo Fernando Serafín Callejas
- Date of birth: 20 April 1975 (age 51)
- Place of birth: Mexico City, Mexico
- Height: 1.77 m (5 ft 10 in)
- Position: Right back

Youth career
- Atlante

Senior career*
| Years | Team | Apps | (Gls) |
| 2000–2004 | Atlante | 74 | (8) |
| 2004–2008 | Monterrey | 48 | (2) |
| 2008–2009 | Puebla | 6 | (0) |
| 2010 | Durango | 1 | (0) |

Managerial career
- 2013: Puebla Reserves and Academy
- 2014–2015: América Reserves and Academy
- 2015–2016: América Premier (Assistant)
- 2016–2017: Morelia Reserves and Academy
- 2017: Sinaloa (Assistant)
- 2019–2024: América Reserves and Academy
- * Club domestic league appearances and goals

Paulo Fernando Serafín Callejas (born 20 April 1975) is a Mexican former professional footballer.
