= Saltillo Soccer F.C. =

Mexican football club

Saltillo Soccer
- Full name: Saltillo Soccer Fútbol Club
- Nicknames: Los Coyotes (The Coyotes); La doble S (The double S)
- Founded: August 1995; 31 years ago 2015; 11 years ago (refounded)
- Ground: Estadio Olímpico Francisco I. Madero; Saltillo, Coahuila
- Capacity: 7,000
- Owner(s): Rodrigo Barba; Omar Pérez "Faisy"
- Chairman: Salvador Rodríguez
- Manager: Joel de León
- League: Liga Premier (Premier A)
- 2025–26: Liga TDP; Regular phase: 2nd – Group XVI; Final phase: National runner–up (promoted)
Home colours	Away colours

Saltillo Soccer Fútbol Club is a Mexican professional football club based in Saltillo, Coahuila that competes in the Premier A, the intermediate branch of the Liga Premier de México, the third tier of Mexican football.

== History ==
Since 1991, businessman Jorge Lankenau Rocha, owner of Grupo Financiero Abaco, had bought the Monterrey franchise with immediate results, obtaining the title of the 1991–92 Copa México, the runner-up in 1992–92 Primera División and the championship of the 1993 CONCACAF Cup Winners Cup.

During 1995, Monterrey continued to achieve success in all divisions of Mexican soccer, and having a very complete squad of players and basic forces, the club decided to purchase the recently created Halcones de Aguascalientes franchise that played in the Primera División 'A' de México, the league prelude to the Primera División de México, and relocated it to Saltillo, Coahuila, taking as a base of players some young people who had recently won the Tercera División de México championship and incorporated some experienced players. This is how the players, instead of being promoted to the Segunda División de México, rose to the Primera División 'A', and that was how the Saltillo Soccer football team was founded in August 1995.

The first game of Saltillo Soccer was a friendly match played in a crowded Estadio Olímpico Francisco I. Madero in August 1995 against their older brother club, Monterrey, where the score was 1-0 in favour of the local team, where the first goal in the history of the franchise was scored by Daniel “El Topo” Moguel. The nickname of Los Coyotes del Saltillo Soccer had been created and during the following tournaments the team consolidated itself in the league, achieving the first victories and increasing its roots in the city. The first idol of the fans was the Argentine Ariel Hernán "El Mago" Mangiantini, who quickly became the team's top scorer and positioned himself as the favourite rite player of Saltillo Soccer. Another of Saltillo Soccer's favorite players in the first season was Carlos Augusto Gomes de Oliveira “Guto” who led the Coyotes midfield.

Managers such as José Luis Castillo, José "Pepe" Treviño, Francisco Avilán, Jorge Vantolrá and Magdaleno Cano paraded during the first years within the team. For the 1996-97 season, a large number of foreign players came to the team who soon revolutionized the team, among them defenders Carlos Amaral, Renato Ferreira, midfielder Antonio Naelson "Sinha" and forward Edson Zwaricz who became the scorer. of the team and who led the team to its first qualification to the league, scoring the famous goal against the Tigres UANL at the Estadio Universitario, shutting up all the fans of Tigres UANL in the Primera "A" classic. The staff continued to be based on those young people who achieved promotion in 1995, including the Chabrand brothers, Julio César “El Negro” García, Eliud Ruiz, Óscar Dautt, César Adame, Joel de León, Carlos “El Chino” Flores and Erick Hernández.

Derived from the great tournament that the newcomers foreign players had, the Monterrey franchise decided to promote the majority of them to the first team, in addition to the young Óscar Dautt and Erick Hernández and reinforcing the Saltillo Soccer squad with some young people such as Ramón Morales, Sergio “El Alvin” Pérez, Lucas Ayala, Hashim Suárez, Omar Gómez, Juan de Dios Ibarra and the African player Abdul Thompson Conteh born in Sierra Leone.

This period marked a successful era for Saltillo Soccer, during which the club achieved national recognition and enjoyed strong support from the local community. Home matches regularly attracted large crowds, with supporters filling the stadium for Saturday afternoon fixtures. The team's distinctive uniform became a widely recognized symbol of the club, and players took pride in representing Saltillo Soccer by wearing the iconic "S" on their jerseys.

During 1998, the businessman and owner of the Saltillo Soccer team, Jorge Lankenau Rocha, began to have financial and legal problems, when he was accused of fraud in banking operations, said crisis touched football, and Saltillo Soccer was quickly affected, already that since there were not enough resources in the Group, it was decided to dismantle the team of players to promote them to the Monterrey franchise's first team, leaving only the young people who came from basic forces in the institution. During the following tournaments, the team was always in the lower-middle part of the general table, ceasing to classify league groups and losing fans when seeing that their best players year after year went to the first team.

The Monterrey franchise was rescued by the FEMSA Company and within the financial restructuring, the Saltillo Soccer team was dissolved in the summer of 2001, since the following soccer year Monterrey and Tigres UANL decided to exchange franchises, Saltillo Soccer was relocated to Ciudad Juárez, Chihuahua to revive the Cobras de Ciudad Juárez, and the feline affiliate was also relocated to Saltillo, Coahuila to give life to the Tigrillos U.A.N.L. Saltillo, who from scratch began to have fans and even reached a final against Club San Luis where they lost it on the global scoreboard and lost the opportunity to lead a Saltillo to the Primera División de México. The Tigrillos Saltillo team was dissolved in 2013.

It was not until 2015 that a businessman from Saltillo, Coahuila, along with a group of soccer people sought to retake the franchise, name and brand of Saltillo Soccer, the only team in the history of the city that had been successful and rooted in the fans over the years, and that's how he sought control of the brand and invested in a franchise of the Tercera División de México, the bottom level division of Mexican football. On September 13, the club again played an official match, drawing 2–2 with Correcaminos UAT. In the 2017–18 and 2018–19 seasons, the team made it to the quarterfinal round of the promotion playoffs.

The project was gaining strength seeking to support local and regional youth with the dream of reaching the Primera División de México. During the years from 2016 to 2019 the training project was consolidated, the football results were arriving, the classification to the Primera División was obtained in several tournaments and the return of the fans to the Estadio Olímpico Francisco I. Madero was retaken, new young people who were interested the project accompanied by the fans that gave birth to the team in the 1990s.

In the Clausura 2017, Saltillo Soccer took over the Titanes de Saltillo franchise that played in the Segunda División de México, but at the end of the season it was relegated and dissolved to make way for Atlético Saltillo Soccer. In 2019, Saltillo Soccer and Atlético Saltillo Soccer jointly created Saltillo F.C. to compete in the Liga Premier - Serie A. However, Saltillo Soccer continued to compete on its own but maintaining close relationships with the new club.

The year 2019 was key for the Saltillo Soccer team, since a serious project began to be structured under the responsibility of local businessman Salvador Rodríguez, who, under the advice of Jorge Urdiales, former president of the Monterrey franchise, created an administrative and financial structure. and soccer that under the command of Joel de León, a former Saltillo Soccer player in the nineties, a team full of quality players was created. The Saltillo Soccer Coyotes became the team to beat within the Tercera División League and the support of the fans was manifested in the stands and social networks. The nostalgia of seeing the Saltillo Soccer team with the "S" on the entire chest of the uniform was a key point for the hope of having a professional football team in the city. During the 2019-2020 season, the team quickly positioned itself in the first place of group 12 and in the first national place of the Tercera División League, scoring goals Saturday to Saturday and displaying a football level much higher than the other teams. This success managed to attract the attention of several businessmen and in the midst of a pandemic that affected all levels of soccer in the world instead of retreating, this group of businessmen decided to invest and commit to the Saltillo Soccer team who were heading directly to the Tercera División in search of promotion. During 2020, local businessmen Pedro Manuel González, Luis Fernando Villarreal Ortíz, Luis and Héctor Fermín Carmona, Rodrigo Garza Villarreal, Victor Moahamar and Juan Carlos Segura joined the team. In addition to two other businessmen who had a media and sports impact, the former Monterrey footballer Walter Ayovi and the television host Omar Reyes better known as “Faisy” who, thanks to the friendship with other businessmen and the quality of the project that formed they joined the Saltillo Soccer Coyotes.

The new project gave immediate results, the contracts of new sponsors, the sale of the broadcast of the games on television to the Multimedios network, the most modern logo change, the sale of T-shirts with the “S” on the chest and the return from the fans in the middle of the COVID-19 pandemic to the stadium would corroborate it. These good results were taken to the field, since the Saltillo Soccer team would qualify in first place in the national TDP above 91 teams and positioning themselves as the favorite to get promotion. However, luck was not on their side in the Tercera División League draw, since in less than 6 days the team had to travel twice to the state of Sonora, after 23 hours on the road they faced Guaymas F.C. obtaining the result from home on Thursday in the first leg, and by Sunday the team was already back to finish qualifying. However, the next day they had to travel again to the state of Sonora now to face Etchojoa where in the first leg they lost 1-0 and in the return match in Saltillo they could not take advantage of the early 1-0 lead and in the last minutes the game was tied, thus ending the dream of promotion after the perfect season.

In 2024, the club's management began talks to purchase the Cimarrones de Sonora franchise, relocate it to Saltillo, Coahuila, and play in the Liga de Expansión MX, the second level division of Mexican football; however, the talks failed and the team continued playing in the Tercera División.

Two years after those conversations, Saltillo Soccer finally managed to get promoted, after reaching the zone final of the Tercera División, which meant the club's promotion to the Segunda División de México, the third category of Mexican football.

== Players ==
=== Current squad ===
As of 2 September 2026

Note: Flags indicate national team as defined under FIFA eligibility rules; some limited exceptions apply. Players may hold more than one non-FIFA nationality.

No.	Pos.	Nation	Player
1	GK	MEX	Cristhian Tapia
2	DF	MEX	Jonathan Gámez
3	DF	MEX	Isaías Reyes
4	DF	MEX	Edson Velázquez
5	DF	MEX	Gilberto Malacara
6	MF	MEX	Edwin Rodríguez
7	FW	MEX	José Rocha
8	MF	MEX	Carlos López
9	FW	BRA	Gianlucca Blas
11	MF	MEX	Julio Rodríguez
12	GK	MEX	Mathias Jiménez
13	DF	MEX	Raymundo Torres
14	MF	MEX	Rodolfo Pérez
15	FW	MEX	Ariel Morán
16	MF	USA	Martín Vara Jr.
17	MF	MEX	Irvin Briones
18	MF	MEX	Diego Delgado

No.	Pos.	Nation	Player
19	FW	MEX	Braulio Ordóñez
20	MF	MEX	Ricardo Reyes
21	MF	MEX	Héctor Martínez
22	DF	MEX	Oswaldo Delgado
23	GK	MEX	Aarón Banda
24	MF	MEX	Luis Long
25	MF	MEX	Rodrigo Nuncio
26	FW	MEX	Jair García
27	FW	MEX	Sergio Cornejo
28	MF	MEX	David Favela
29	FW	MEX	Ángel Crespo
31	MF	MEX	Rodrigo García
32	MF	MEX	Santiago Luis
33	DF	MEX	Harlem García
34	MF	USA	Zayden Martínez
36	GK	MEX	Gael Méndez
37	MF	MEX	Iván Medina

== Honours ==
=== Amateur ===
- Tercera División de México (1): 1994–1995

Crest used in 1999

Crest used in 1994

== See also ==
- Football in Mexico
- Titanes de Saltillo
- Saltillo F.C.
