= Instituto México =

Instituto México de B.C.

Location
- Ave. Marcelino Champagnat 850; Tijuana, Baja California; Mexico

Information
- Type: Private
- Motto: Ad Jesum per Mariam
- Established: 1965
- Grades: 1–12
- Colors: blue and white
- Mascot: Eagle
- Affiliation: Marist
- Website: www.imbc.com.mx

Instituto México de B.C. is a private Catholic Elementary, Junior and High levels School located in the city of Tijuana, Mexico.

== History ==
Instituto México de Tijuana, B.C. is a civil association, founded on June 13, 1963. The school started operating on September 6, 1965. It had a total of 204 students (boys only) spanning from the 3rd to the 6th grade. For the next seven years the school continued to expand until it included 12 grades (1st to 12th grades). In 1973 the school added its first generation of Co-ed high school level grades (10th-12th), "Bachillerato" (Preparatoria).

== Status ==
In 2008 the Mexican federal government applied a test to alumni of all schools in the country (totalling 13 million students) to measure level of knowledge and abilities; Insituto México ranked 30th in the nation and 1st in the state (Baja California).
