= Óscar Rojas (Costa Rican footballer) =

Costa Rican footballer (born 1979)

Oscar Rojas
Personal information
- Full name: Oscar Emilio Rojas Ruiz
- Date of birth: 27 April 1979 (age 47)
- Place of birth: San José, Costa Rica
- Height: 1.73 m (5 ft 8 in)
- Position: Midfielder

Senior career*
Years	Team	Apps	(Gls)
1999–2000	Carmelita		
2000–2002	La Piedad	27	(8)
2002	Tigrillos Saltillo	15	(2)
2003	Irapuato	7	(2)
2003–2005	Dorados	57	(10)
2005–2006	Veracruz	33	(2)
2006–2008	Jaguares	74	(13)
2009–	Morelia	13	(0)
2009–2010	→ Mérida (loan)	31	(7)
2010–2011	→ Indios (loan)	27	(3)
2011	→ Neza (loan)	14	(0)
2012	→ Herediano (loan)	17	(2)
2012–2013	→ La Piedad (loan)	25	(7)
2014–2015	Estudiantes Altamira	24	(2)
2015	→ Zacatepec XII (loan)	12	(1)
2015–2016	Venados	15	(2)
2016–2017	SC Corinthians USA	?	(?)
2017	Municipal Grecia	8	(1)

International career
2001–2012	Costa Rica	28	(1)
- * Club domestic league appearances and goals as of 9 January 2018

Oscar Emilio Rojas Ruiz (born 27 April 1979 in San José) is a Costa Rican football midfielder or forward, who last played for Municipal Grecia.

== Club career ==
Rojas made his professional debut in 1999 for Carmelita before moving abroad to play in the Primera División with La Piedad in the 2001 Invierno. He had a stint at second division Tigrillos de Nuevo León and has also played for Irapuato.

He made his return to the Primera División in 2004, joining Dorados for the 2004 Apertura. He was a mainstay in midfield with the team, starting 16 of 17 games, and scoring three goals. Rojas subsequently moved to Veracruz in summer 2005 and Jaguares Chiapas in 2006. He remained with until the end of 2008, helping the club reach the playoff series twice. He left them for a brief spell at Morelia, then dropped into the second division to play for Mérida, Indios and Toros Neza before returning to Costa Rica with Herediano ahead of the 2012 Verano championship.

=== Return to Mexico ===
In summer 2012, Rojas returned to La Piedad, with the club being relocated to Veracruz and recalled Tiburones Rojos. His debut was postponed when Morelia, who still owed him, did not immediately agree on the transfer. He left the club in summer 2013 after they told him he did not fit in their plans after winning promotion to Mexico's top tier. After a few months out of a club, he joined another Mexican second division side, Estudiantes Altamira.

== International career ==
Óscar Rojas made his debut for Costa Rica in a 1–0 World Cup qualification victory over Jamaica on 11 November 2001 and earned a total of 28 caps, scoring 1 goal. He represented his country in 9 FIFA World Cup qualification matches and appeared at the 2002 CONCACAF Gold Cup, but missed out on the 2002 FIFA World Cup as one of the last cuts by national coach Alexandre Guimaraes. Absent from the national team for three years, he returned to the selection in 2005, first under Jorge Luis Pinto and then under the reappointed Guimaraes and he played at the 2005 CONCACAF Gold Cup. Again, however, he was not chosen for the World Cup squad in 2006. His first international goal came against Peru national football team on 22 August 2007.

He announced his retirement from the national team on 10 April 2009. However, he was once again selected by Pinto for a match against Jamaica on 21 March 2012, making his return to the national team just weeks before his thirty-third birthday. His final international was a September 2012 FIFA World Cup qualification match against Mexico

=== International goals ===
Scores and results list Costa Rica's goal tally first.

N.	Date	Venue	Opponent	Score	Result	Competition
1.	22 August 2007	Estadio Ricardo Saprissa Aymá, San José, Costa Rica	Peru	1–0	1–1	Friendly match

== Personal life ==
Rojas is married to Jessica Tencio and they were expecting their fourth child in October 2014.
