= Estadio Juan N. López =

Football stadium in La Piedad, Mexico

Coordinates: 20.358061°N 102.0499°W

- Interactive map of Estadio Juan N. López
- Full name: Estadio Juan Nepomuceno López
- Location: La Piedad, Michoacán, Mexico
- Owner: Patronato del Estadio Juan N. López
- Operator: Constructora ESMART
- Capacity: 13,356 (football)
- Surface: Grass
- Field size: 105 x 68 m

Construction
- Opened: August 28, 1994

Tenants
- La Piedad (Segunda División de México) (1994–present); Real Zamora (Segunda División de México) (2016, 2024); Tritones Vallarta (Segunda División de México) (2026–present)

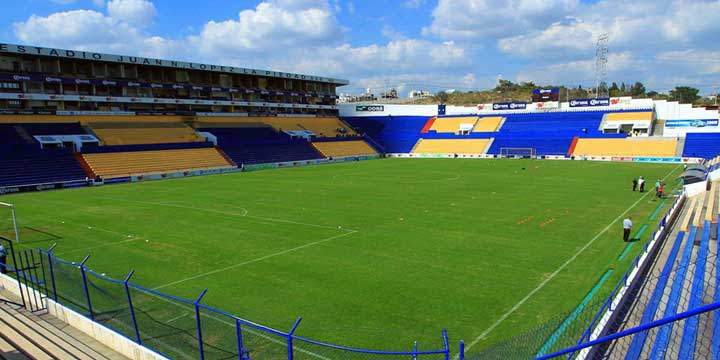
The Estadio Juan N. López.

Estadio Juan N. López is a football stadium located in La Piedad, Michoacán, Mexico. It is home to Segunda División de México (Mexico Second Division) club La Piedad. It opened in 1994 and has a setting capacity of 13,356.

== See also ==
- List of football stadiums in Mexico
- Lists of stadiums
