= Cruz Azul Hidalgo =

Mexican football club, reserve team of Cruz Azul

- Full name: Club de Futbol Cruz Azul S.A. de C.V. Hidalgo
- Nickname: La Maquinita (The Little Machine)
- Founded: 1993; 33 years ago April 2026; 7 months ago (refounded)
- Ground: Estadio Refundación
- Capacity: 7,761
- Owner: Cooperativa La Cruz Azul
- President: Víctor Velázquez
- Head coach: Esteban Landazábal
- League: Liga de Expansión MX
- Apertura 2026: Regular phase: 15th of 16; Final phase: Not qualified

Club de Futbol Cruz Azul S.A. de C.V. Hidalgo, simply known as Cruz Azul Hidalgo, is a professional football club based in Ciudad Cooperativa Cruz Azul, Hidalgo. The club competes in Liga de Expansión MX, the second level of Mexican football, and plays its home matches at Estadio Refundación. Founded in 1993, it serves as a reserve team of Cruz Azul.

The club competed at various lower levels of Mexican football. In 2014, the original second-division franchise was sold, prompting the affiliate team Cruz Azul Jasso to adopt the Cruz Azul Hidalgo identity to continue competing in the Liga Premier de México. The team operated until its dissolution in 2021. Ahead of the 2026–27 season, the club was reestablished to return to the Liga de Expansión MX.

== History ==
=== Early years ===
The team began its professional activity in the Tercera División de México, in 1990 it achieved the runner-up in the category and managed to be promoted to the Segunda División 'B' de México. In 1994 the team won its promotion to the Segunda División 'A' de México, however, that year a remodeling of Mexican football was presented with the creation of the Primera División 'A' de México, so Cruz Azul Hidalgo was invited to the new Segunda División, which became the third tier of the Mexican league system. In the first season in the Segunda División, Cruz Azul Hidalgo won the championship of the season and the promotion to the Primera División 'A' after defeating Bachilleres.

=== Ascenso MX ===
In the Verano 1999 and Verano 2000 tournaments of the Primera División 'A', the club finished as runner-up in the league, being defeated by Unión de Curtidores and Irapuato respectively.

In 2003, the team was relocated to the city of Oaxaca and renamed Cruz Azul Oaxaca, in this location the team was runner-up in the 2005 Apertura Tournament, being defeated by Puebla, in 2006 the team returned to Hidalgo. In 2006, Cruz Azul Jasso was created as the institution's third team, participating in the Segunda División.

After 2006, the team consolidated itself in the league, qualifying for the play–offs on a regular basis, and continuing its participation even when the league eliminated the reserve teams from the Primera División de México. As of 2012, the team began to have problems in the relegation table, ensuring its permanence in the final part of the seasons.

In 2014, the team was relocated to Zacatepec, Morelos and purchased by the owners of Zacatepec 1948, who used the franchise to give continuity to their team in the Liga de Ascenso de México.

=== Liga Premier de México ===
After the relocation of the Cruz Azul Hidalgo franchise to Zacatepec, Morelos and Zacatepec 1948 bought the team's rights and license to join the Ascenso MX, Cruz Azul Jasso, which played in the Liga Premier de Ascenso, was renamed Cruz Azul Hidalgo to ensure the team's permanence in a category below the one it was active in until that year. The club was runner-up in the division category in the Clausura 2015 and 2020–21 tournaments.

At the end of 2020, Cruz Azul had changes in its board of directors, so an austerity policy was initiated with the aim of eliminating the club's financial debts, for this reason, the continuity of the Cruz Azul Hidalgo team began to be questioned, on June 26, 2021 it was announced that the team would be put on hiatus for the 2021–22 season.

The team was not reactivated for the 2022–23 season, which, combined with the difficulties in operating in the Ciudad Cooperativa due to internal problems of the Cooperativa La Cruz Azul, meant the dissolution of Cruz Azul Hidalgo.

=== Liga de Expansión MX ===
In April 2026, it was reported that Cruz Azul's management had plans to revive its reserves team with a view to competing from the 2026-27 season, so it requested its registration in the Liga de Expansión MX, the second division level of Mexican football. In July, the team's return to football was confirmed after a five-year hiatus.

== Stadium ==
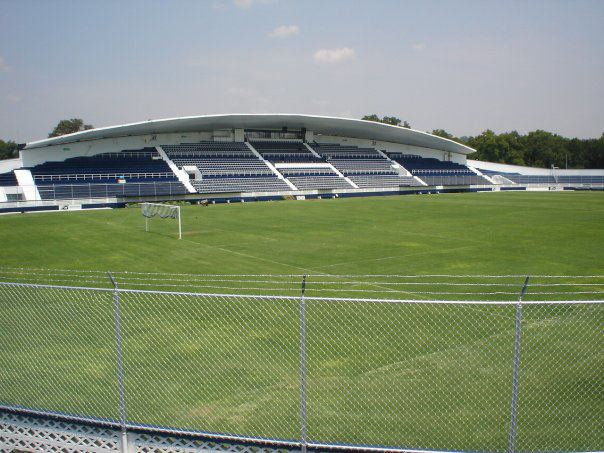
Estadio Refundación, home of Cruz Azul Hidalgo.

Estadio Refundación, formerly known as Estadio 10 de Diciembre, originally served as the home ground for Cruz Azul from their promotion to the top flight in 1964 until the senior team was relocated to Mexico City in 1971. Following the relocation, the venue transitioned into the primary sporting base for the organization's reserve and youth development system. Most notably, it served as the longtime home for the affiliate club Cruz Azul Hidalgo across more than two decades of competition in the Primera División 'A' de México / Liga de Ascenso de México and the Segunda División de México, while also hosting matches for Cruz Azul Jasso and other developmental categories.

== Personnel ==
=== Coaching staff ===
Position	Staff
Head coach	(Colombia) Esteban Landazábal
Assistant coaches	(Mexico) Francisco González
Assistant coaches	(Mexico) Rafael Rojano
Goalkeeper coach	(Mexico) Aldo Paredes
Fitness coach	(Mexico) José Puga
Physiotherapist	(Mexico) Raúl Ramírez
Team doctor	(Mexico) Josué Ramos

Source: Liga de Expansión MX

=== Management ===
Position	Staff
President	(Mexico) Víctor Velázquez
Administrative director	(Mexico) Antonio Reynoso
Director of football	(Uruguay) Iván Alonso

Source: Récord

== Players ==
=== Current squad ===
As of 6 August 2026

Note: Flags indicate national team as defined under FIFA eligibility rules; some limited exceptions apply. Players may hold more than one non-FIFA nationality.

No.	Pos.	Nation	Player
41	MF	MEX	Louis Víctor Derbez
42	MF	MEX	**Jorge García**
44	MF	MEX	Cristhian León
45	DF	MEX	Leonardo Sámano
47	MF	MEX	Sergio de los Ríos
48	GK	MEX	Nicolás Calixto
49	DF	MEX	**Josué Díaz**
50	MF	MEX	Kenneth González
51	MF	MEX	Luis de Jesús
53	MF	MEX	Víctor Taboada
55	MF	MEX	**Rogelio González**
56	MF	MEX	Jesús Lara
57	MF	MEX	**Diego Valdéz**

No.	Pos.	Nation	Player
58	MF	MEX	**Emmanuel Sánchez**
59	DF	MEX	Diego Ramírez
60	MF	MEX	**Ariel Castro**
61	GK	MEX	Bruno Salgado
62	MF	MEX	Emanuel Rodríguez
63	MF	MEX	Ángel Saavedra
64	FW	MEX	Fabrizzio Orozco
66	DF	VEN	**Javier Suárez**
67	DF	MEX	**Jaziel Mendoza**
68	MF	MEX	**Christian Valdivia**
69	DF	MEX	André Cubillas
70	DF	MEX	**Iván Silva**
71	MF	MEX	Víctor Velázquez

=== Youth squad ===
Note: Flags indicate national team as defined under FIFA eligibility rules; some limited exceptions apply. Players may hold more than one non-FIFA nationality.

No.	Pos.	Nation	Player
113	FW	MEX	Samuel Espinosa
183	MF	VEN	Kelvin Palacios
196	MF	MEX	Ian Ramírez
203	MF	MEX	Xandor Camacho

No.	Pos.	Nation	Player
213	MF	MEX	**Jeyson Durán**
214	FW	MEX	**Mateo Levy**
222	DF	MEX	Éric Villegas
258	FW	MEX	**Emiliano Castañeda**

Players listed in bold have made at least one senior first-team appearance.

== Honours ==
=== Domestic ===
==== Lower levels ====
- Primera División A
  - Runners-up (2): Ver–1999, Ver–2000
- Segunda División
  - Champions (1): 1994–95
  - Runners-up (2): Cla–2015, 2020–21
- Tercera División
  - Runners-up (1): 1989–90
