= Héctor Giménez (footballer) =

Uruguayan footballer (born 1975)

Personal information
- Full name: Héctor Horacio Giménez Silvera
- Date of birth: 29 April 1975 (age 51)
- Place of birth: Montevideo, Uruguay
- Height: 1.78 m (5 ft 10 in)
- Position: Striker

Senior career*
| Years | Team | Apps | (Gls) |
| 2000–2001 | Gallos | 45 | (23) |
| 2002–2003 | Atlético Mexiquense | 69 | (38) |
| 2003–2004 | Dorados de Sinaloa | 30 | (19) |
| 2004–2005 | San Luis F.C. | 59 | (24) |
| 2006 | Correcaminos UAT | 19 | (3) |
| 2006–2007 | Dorados de Sinaloa | 26 | (5) |
| 2007–2009 | Club Necaxa | 32 | (9) |
| 2009–2010 | Indios | 23 | (5) |
| 2010–2011 | Club León | 11 | (3) |
| 2011 | → Club Necaxa (on loan) | 9 | (0) |
| 2012 | Altamira | 12 | (6) |
| Total | | 335 | (135) |

Managerial career
- 2015: Alebrijes de Oaxaca (Assistant)
- 2019–2026: León Reserves and Academy
- * Club domestic league appearances and goals as of June 9, 2011

Héctor Horacio Giménez Silvera (born 29 April 1975) is a former Uruguayan - Mexican football striker who last played for Estudiantes de Altamira in the Liga de Ascenso.
