= Dorados de Tijuana =

- Full name: Club Dorados de Tijuana
- Nickname: Dorados
- Founded: 2006
- Dissolved: 2006
- Ground: Estadio Caliente, Tijuana, Mexico
- Capacity: 23,000
- League: Ascenso MX
- Website: http://www.xolos.com.mx
Home colours	Away colours

Club Dorados de Tijuana, also known as Dorados de Tijuana or simply Dorados, was a professional club football Mexico subsidiary of the Dorados de Sinaloa.

== History ==
The team was bought by the Dorados de Sinaloa end of 2005; previous eleventh was known simply as Club Tijuana, not to be confused with the current Club Tijuana Xoloitzcuintles de Caliente. The team had a bad season and dragged the problem of percentage of the old franchise, so it was relegated to Segunda División de México, before being transferred to the city of Mazatlan and being renamed Dorados de Mazatlán.

== Previous teams ==
The following teams were once in Tijuana and how disappeared since their franchise was purchased or relegated to Segunda División de México:

- Club Tijuana: changed owner and renamed Dorados de Tijuana
- Nacional Tijuana
- Chivas Tijuana: subsidiary of Chivas
- Trotamundos Tijuana: converted to Trotamundos Salamanca
- Tijuana Stars
- Inter Tijuana

== International tournaments ==
Dorados de Tijuana has played games against Mexico U-20 national team Sub-20 in Ensenada, also some games against Gauchos de San Diego.

== Statistics Primera Division 'A' ==
GP 19; W:4; T:4; L:11; GF 13; GA 30 In their only season in Clausura 2006.
