= Pablo Bocco =

Argentine footballer and manager

Personal information
- Full name: Pablo Alberto Bocco
- Date of birth: 3 May 1974 (age 52)
- Place of birth: Córdoba, Argentina
- Position: Forward

Senior career*
Years	Team	Apps	(Gls)
1993–1997	Club Atlético Belgrano		
1997–2000	Real Sociedad de Zacatecas		
2001–2002	Toros Neza		
2002	Club Zacatepec		
2002	Estudiantes de Río Cuarto		
2003	Motagua		(6)
2004–2007	Tampico Madero	43	(13)
2007–2008	Deportivo Roca		
2009	Tiro Federal		

Managerial career
- 2017: Cruz Azul (Women)
- 2018: Tuxtla (Assistant)
- 2018–2019: Tuxtla
- 2019: Tuxtla (Assistant)
- * Club domestic league appearances and goals

Pablo Alberto Bocco (born May 3, 1974) is an Argentine football manager and former player.
