= Gallos Hidrocálidos de Aguascalientes =

Mexican football club

- Full name: Club de Fútbol Gallos Hidrocálidos de Aguascalientes
- Nicknames: Gallos, Gallos Hidrocálidos
- Founded: 1992; 34 years ago
- Dissolved: 2014; 12 years ago
- Ground: Estadio Municipal; Aguascalientes, Aguascalientes
- Capacity: 10,000
Home colours	Away colours

Club de Fútbol Gallos Hidrocálidos de Aguascalientes was a Mexican football club based in the city of Aguascalientes, Aguascalientes.

== History ==
The club was founded in 1992, when José Carmelo González, bought a franchise from the Segunda División de México which he relocated to Aguascalientes where there was no professional football club.

The club played its last tournament in 2000-2001 when the Governor of Aguascalientes bought the Primera División de México franchise Necaxa, with its national following, and relocated it from Mexico City to the city of Aguascalientes, Aguascalientes. Gallos Hidrocálidos de Aguascalientes was then moved to Guadalajara, Jalisco and sold to Chivas, and changed its name to F.C. Tapatío de Guadalajara, affiliated to Chivas.

In 2012, the team was refounded to participate in the Tercera División de México, and in 2014 it stopped participating in the league and was officially dissolved. However, between 2015 and 2019, its registration was used by the clubs Tamasopo F.C., Lobos de Zacoalco and Autlán F.C.

== Honors ==
Primera División 'A' de México: 1

2000

Segunda División de México: 1

1998

== See also ==
- Segunda División de México
- Primera División 'A' de México
- Necaxa
- Football in Mexico
