= 2002–03 Primera División A season =

Season of a Mexican football league

Primera División A
- Season: 2002–2003
- Champions: Invierno: Irapuato (3rd Title); Verano: León (1st title)
- Promoted: Irapuato
- Relegated: Gavilanes de Nuevo Laredo
- Top goalscorer: Invierno: Héctor Carlos Álvarez (23); Verano: Julio César Yegros (9)

Primera División A (Méxican First A Division) is a Mexican football tournament. This season was composed of Invierno 2002 and Verano 2003. Irapuato was the winner of the promotion to First Division after winning León in the promotion playoff.

== Changes for the 2002–03 season ==
- Due to the creation of Jaguares de Chiapas, Atlético Chiapas moved to Mérida and renamed Atlético Yucatán.
- Querétaro F.C. was promoted to First Division after bought the La Piedad franchise. To occupy the site left by Querétaro, the owners created a new Irapuato F.C. franchise.
- Toros Neza was bought by new owners, for that reason the team was relocated to Nuevo Laredo and its renamed Gavilanes de Nuevo Laredo.
- Potros Zitácuaro was relocated to Mexico City and renamed Potros DF, as an Atlante F.C. reserve team.
- Due to the lack of local economic support, Tampico Madero was sold, the new owners moved the team to La Piedad, to revive the local team that had lost its place in Liga MX.
- Gallos de Aguascalientes had to sell its franchise, because its stadium was demolished and the alternative presented by the club was not approved by the Femexfut. C.D. Guadalajara bought the team and refounded the C.D. Tapatío based in Guadalajara.
- Bachilleres was sold, the owners argue sports and administrative reasons. The new board relocated the team to Orizaba and renamed as Albinegros de Orizaba.
- Club León was relegated from First Division.
- Cihuatlán was promoted from Second Division.

=== Changes for the Verano 2003 tournament ===
- Potros DF was relocated to Tapachula and renamed to Jaguares de Tapachula.
- Albinegros de Orizaba was relocated to Villahermosa and renamed Lagartos de Tabasco.
- La Piedad was relocated to Celaya and renamed Celaya F.C.
- Gavilanes de Nuevo Laredo was disaffiliated by the FMF, for that reason, the team did not play in this tournament.

== Stadiums and locations ==
Club	Stadium	Capacity	City
Acapulco	Unidad Deportiva Acapulco	13,000	Acapulco, Guerrero
Atlético Mexiquense	Nemesio Díez	35,000	Toluca, State of Mexico
Cihuatlán	El Llanito	5,000	Cihuatlán, Jalisco
Cobras Juárez	Olímpico Benito Juárez	22,000	Ciudad Juárez, Chihuahua
Correcaminos UAT	Marte R. Gómez	20,000	Ciudad Victoria, Tamaulipas
Cruz Azul Hidalgo	10 de Diciembre	17,000	Cruz Azul, Hidalgo
Durango	Francisco Zarco	15,000	Durango, Durango
Gavilanes	Unidad Deportiva Benito Juárez	6,500	Nuevo Laredo, Tamaulipas
Irapuato	Sergio León Chávez	26,000	Irapuato, Guanajuato
La Piedad	Juan N. López	18,000	La Piedad, Michoacán
León	Nou Camp	35,000	León, Guanajuato
Nacional Tijuana	Cerro Colorado	12,000	Tijuana, Baja California
Oaxaca	Benito Juárez	15,000	Oaxaca, Oaxaca
Orizaba	Socum	7,000	Orizaba, Veracruz
Potros DF	Centro de Alto Rendimiento	1,000	Mexico City
RS Zacatecas	Francisco Villa	18,000	Zacatecas, Zacatecas
Tapatío	Jalisco	55,000	Guadalajara, Jalisco
Tigrillos	Francisco I. Madero	10,000	Saltillo, Coahuila
Yucatán	Carlos Iturralde	25,000	Mérida, Yucatán
Zacatepec	Agustín Coruco Díaz	18,000	Zacatepec, Morelos

=== Clausura 2003 new teams ===
Club	Stadium	Capacity	City
Celaya	Miguel Alemán Valdés	25,000	Celaya, Guanajuato
Lagartos de Tabasco	Olímpico de Villahermosa	12,000	Villahermosa, Tabasco
Jaguares de Tapachula	Olímpico de Tapachula	10,000	Tapachula, Chiapas

Location of teams in the 2002-2003 Primera División A

== Invierno 2002 ==
=== Group league tables ===
==== Group 1 ====
Pos	Team	Pld	W	D	L	GF	GA	GD	Pts
1	La Piedad	19	10	6	3	36	25	+11	36
2	Cobras Juárez	19	8	4	7	30	28	+2	28
3	RS Zacatecas	19	8	3	8	34	29	+5	27
4	León	19	6	8	5	23	23	0	26
5	Cruz Azul Hidalgo	19	2	9	8	19	30	−11	15

Source: Ascenso MX
Rules for classification: 1st points; 2nd goal difference; 3rd goals scored; 4th head-to-head; 5th away goals scored; 6th draw

==== Group 2 ====
Pos	Team	Pld	W	D	L	GF	GA	GD	Pts
1	Tapatío	19	7	10	2	30	17	+13	31
2	Zacatepec	19	8	6	5	36	27	+9	30
3	Acapulco	19	8	6	5	28	19	+9	30
4	Potros DF	19	2	9	8	24	37	−13	15
5	Orizaba	19	2	9	8	23	36	−13	15

Source: Ascenso MX
Rules for classification: 1st points; 2nd goal difference; 3rd goals scored; 4th head-to-head; 5th away goals scored; 6th draw

==== Group 3 ====
Pos	Team	Pld	W	D	L	GF	GA	GD	Pts
1	Irapuato	19	9	8	2	43	30	+13	35
2	Durango	19	8	6	5	30	31	−1	30
3	Oaxaca	19	7	7	5	28	25	+3	28
4	Yucatán	19	7	7	5	29	22	+7	28
5	Gavilanes	19	1	6	12	17	38	−21	9

Source: Ascenso MX
Rules for classification: 1st points; 2nd goal difference; 3rd goals scored; 4th head-to-head; 5th away goals scored; 6th draw

==== Group 4 ====
Pos	Team	Pld	W	D	L	GF	GA	GD	Pts
1	Correcaminos UAT	19	6	10	3	23	27	−4	28
2	Cihuatlán	19	6	8	5	35	27	+8	26
3	Nacional Tijuana	19	5	8	6	31	30	+1	23
4	Tigrillos	19	5	8	6	28	33	−5	23
5	Atlético Mexiquense	19	3	6	10	18	32	−14	15

Source: Ascenso MX
Rules for classification: 1st points; 2nd goal difference; 3rd goals scored; 4th head-to-head; 5th away goals scored; 6th draw

=== General league table ===
Pos	Team	Pld	W	D	L	GF	GA	GD	Pts
1	La Piedad	19	10	6	3	36	25	+11	36
2	Irapuato	19	9	8	2	43	30	+13	35
3	Tapatío	19	7	10	2	30	17	+13	31
4	Zacatepec	19	8	6	5	36	27	+9	30
5	Acapulco	19	8	6	5	28	19	+9	30
6	Durango	19	8	6	5	30	31	−1	30
7	Oaxaca	19	7	7	5	28	25	+3	28
8	Yucatán	19	7	7	5	29	22	+7	28
9	Correcaminos UAT	19	6	10	3	23	27	−4	28
10	Cobras Juárez	19	8	4	7	30	28	+2	28
11	RS Zacatecas	19	8	3	8	34	29	+5	27
12	Cihuatlán	19	6	8	5	35	27	+8	26
13	León	19	6	8	5	23	23	0	26
14	Nacional Tijuana	19	5	8	6	31	30	+1	23
15	Tigrillos	19	5	8	6	28	33	−5	23
16	Cruz Azul Hidalgo	19	2	9	8	19	30	−11	15
17	Potros DF	19	2	9	8	24	37	−13	15
18	Orizaba	19	2	9	8	23	36	−13	15
19	Atlético Mexiquense	19	3	6	10	18	32	−14	15
20	Gavilanes	19	1	6	12	17	38	−21	9

Source: Ascenso MX
Rules for classification: 1st points; 2nd goal difference; 3rd goals scored; 4th head-to-head; 5th away goals scored; 6th draw

=== Results ===
Home \ Away	ACA	AMX	CIH	COB	CRH	DUR	GNL	IRA	LAP	LEO	NAT	OAX	ORI	POT	RSZ	TAP	TGR	UAT	YUC	ZAC
Acapulco		1–0	2–0			1–2			2–0		2–0	7–2	3–4				0–0	0–0		1–1
At. Mexiquense				0–3	1–0		4–0	2–2		0–0				0–2	0–4	1–1			2–3	
Cihuatlán		3–0		7–1			1–1	3–0		2–0					3–0	0–0			2–2	1–2
Cobras Juárez	3–1				0–1	1–0	1–0			2–1				5–0	1–0	2–0	2–2		1–1	
Cruz Azul Hidalgo	0–0		1–2			0–2			3–3		0–2	0–1	1–1	2–2				3–0		
Durango		1–0	2–1					3–3	3–2		0–0	1–1	2–1				3–1	1–1		0–1
Gavilanes	1–2				5–0	2–4			2–3			2–3		1–1	0–5		0–1	0–2		
Irapuato	2–2			2–1	3–3		4–0			2–0				2–2	2–1	1–1	4–2		1–0	
La Piedad		2–1	1–1	3–2				2–4			2–0	3–0	4–1				0–0	2–1		2–0
León	0–0				3–1	2–2	0–0		1–2					3–2	3–2	1–1	2–0		2–1	
Nacional		2–1	5–4	3–0			1–1	1–1		1–2					2–3	2–2				5–2
Oaxaca		1–0	1–1	2–1				0–3		3–1	2–0		4–1				2–3	1–1		4–3
Orizaba		1–2	2–2	1–1			2–1	1–2		1–1	1–1					1–1				1–1
Potros DF	1–3		0–0			3–0			0–1		1–1	4–4	1–0					1–1	1–2	2–2
RS Zacatecas	2–0				2–1	2–2			1–1			3–1	2–0	3–0				0–0	1–2	
Tapatío	1–0				0–0	3–0	0–0		2–2			4–0		4–2	5–1		1–1		2–0	
Tigrillos		5–1	2–2		2–2						2–2		2–2	2–1	3–1				0–3	0–3
Correcaminos UAT		1–1	3–0	2–2				2–2		0–0	2–1		2–2			2–0	2–0			1–0
Yucatán	0–1				1–1	6–2	0–0		1–1		2–2	0–0	3–0					1–0		
Zacatepec		2–2		2–1	0–0		4–1	4–2		1–1					0–3	1–2			3–0	

Updated to match(es) played on 24 November 2002. Source: Ascenso MX
Legend: Blue = home team win; Yellow = draw; Red = away team win.

=== Reclassification series ===
Team 1	Agg.	Team 2	1st leg	2nd leg
Acapulco	4–2	Cihuatlán	2–0	2–2
Oaxaca	2–0	Cobras Juárez	2–0	0–0

==== First leg ====
27 November 2002	Cihuatlán	0–2	Acapulco	Cihuatlán, Jalisco
15:00		Report	Hernández 26', 50'	Stadium: Estadio El Llanito; Attendance: 4,000; Referee: Germán Arredondo

27 November 2002	Cobras Juárez	0–2	Oaxaca	Ciudad Juárez, Chihuahua
19:00		Report	Morales 53', 81'	Stadium: Estadio Olímpico Benito Juárez; Attendance: 6,000; Referee: Antonio Marrufo

==== Second leg ====
30 November 2002	Acapulco	2–2 (4–2 agg.)	Cihuatlán	Acapulco, Guerrero
20:00	Infante 31'; Ramírez 62'	Report	González 48'; Torres 82'	Stadium: Unidad Deportiva Acapulco; Attendance: 5,000; Referee: Armando Archundia

30 November 2002	Oaxaca	0–0 (2–0 agg.)	Cobras Juárez	Oaxaca, Oaxaca
20:00		Report		Stadium: Estadio Benito Juárez; Attendance: 7,000; Referee: Gilberto Alcalá

=== Liguilla ===
Quarter-finals
1	La Piedad (p.t.)	0	2	2
8	Correcaminos UAT	1	1	2
4	Zacatepec	0	3	3
5	Acapulco	2	2	4
2	Irapuato	1	3	4
7	Oaxaca	2	1	3
3	Tapatío (p.t.)	0	1	1
6	Durango	1	0	1

Semi-finals
1	La Piedad	1	2	3
5	Acapulco	0	0	0
2	Irapuato	1	4	5
3	Tapatío	0	2	2

Final
1	La Piedad	0	0	0 (4)
2	Irapuato (pen.)	0	0	0 (5)

- (p.t.) The team was classified by its best position in the general table

==== Quarter-finals ====
Team 1	Agg.	Team 2	1st leg	2nd leg
La Piedad	2–2	Correcaminos UAT	0–1	2–1
Irapuato	4–3	Oaxaca	1–2	3–1
Tapatío	1–1	Durango	0–1	1–0
Zacatepec	3–4	Acapulco	2–0	2–3

===== First leg =====
4 December 2002	Acapulco	2–0	Zacatepec	Acapulco, Guerrero
20:00	de la Torre 48'; Carevic 49'	Report		Stadium: Unidad Deportiva Acapulco; Attendance: 8,000; Referee: Francisco Javier Caspeta

4 December 2002	Oaxaca	2–1	Irapuato	Oaxaca, Oaxaca
20:15	Morales 2'; Sarkissian 88'	Report	González 66'	Stadium: Estadio Benito Juárez; Attendance: 10,000; Referee: Armando Rosales

4 December 2002	Durango	1–0	Tapatío	Durango, Durango
20:30	Peña 50'	Report		Stadium: Estadio Francisco Zarco; Attendance: 12,000; Referee: Juan Joel Rangel

5 December 2002	Correcaminos UAT	1–0	La Piedad	Ciudad Victoria, Tamaulipas
20:30	Franco 54'	Report		Stadium: Estadio Marte R. Gómez; Attendance: 11,000; Referee: Marco Antonio Cueva

===== Second leg =====
7 December 2002	Zacatepec	3–2 (3–4 agg.)	Acapulco	Zacatepec, Morelos
15:00	Álvarez 38', 67', 86'	Report	Ramírez 41'; Rey 48'	Stadium: Estadio Agustín Coruco Díaz; Attendance: 3,000; Referee: José Luis Camargo

7 December 2002	Tapatío	1–0 (1–1 agg.)	Durango	Guadalajara, Jalisco
17:00	Valenzuela 23'	Report		Stadium: Estadio Jalisco; Attendance: 1,000; Referee: Mauricio Morales

7 December 2002	Irapuato	3–1 (4–3 agg.)	Oaxaca	Irapuato, Guanajuato
19:00	Terres 4', 58'; Ferreira 48'	Report	Morales 53'	Stadium: Estadio Sergio León Chávez; Attendance: 20,000; Referee: Hugo León Guajardo

8 December 2002	La Piedad	2–1 (2–2 agg.)	Correcaminos UAT	La Piedad, Michoacán
12:00	Orrego 23' o.g. Dias 58'	Report	Franco 65'	Stadium: Estadio Juan N. López; Attendance: 12,000; Referee: Sergio Silva Rigau

==== Semi-finals ====
Team 1	Agg.	Team 2	1st leg	2nd leg
La Piedad	3–0	Acapulco	1–0	2–0
Irapuato	5–2	Tapatío	1–0	4–2

===== First leg =====
11 December 2002	Tapatío	0–1	Irapuato	Irapuato, Guanajuato
17:00		Report	Ferreira 19'	Stadium: Estadio Sergio León Chávez; Attendance: 5,000; Referee: Marco Antonio Cueva

12 December 2002	Acapulco	0–1	La Piedad	Acapulco, Guerrero
20:00		Report	Días 89'	Stadium: Unidad Deportiva Acapulco; Attendance: 8,000; Referee: Hugo León Guajardo

===== Second leg =====
14 December 2002	Irapuato	4–2 (5–2 agg.)	Tapatío	Irapuato, Guanajuato
19:00	Ferreira 8', 41', 65'; González 14'	Report	Rodríguez 16'; Alfaro 52'	Stadium: Estadio Sergio León Chávez; Attendance: 15,000; Referee: Sergio Silva Rigau

15 December 2002	La Piedad	2–0 (3–0 agg.)	Acapulco	La Piedad, Michoacán
15:00	Sánchez 2'; Nascimento 38'	Report		Stadium: Estadio Juan N. López; Attendance: 15,000; Referee: José Luis Camargo

==== Final ====
Team 1	Agg.	Team 2	1st leg	2nd leg
La Piedad	0–0	Irapuato (pen.)	0–0	0–0

===== First leg =====
19 December 2002	Irapuato	0–0	La Piedad	Irapuato, Guanajuato
20:00		Report		Stadium: Estadio Sergio León Chávez; Attendance: 26,000; Referee: Sergio Silva Rigau

===== Second leg =====
22 December 2002	La Piedad	0–0 (0–0 agg.) (4–5 p)	Irapuato	La Piedad, Michoacán
15:00		Report		Stadium: Estadio Juan N. López; Attendance: 15,000; Referee: José Abramo Lira
	Penalties
	Sánchez (penalty scored); Dias (penalty scored); Cerecero (penalty scored); Fuentes (penalty missed); Galindo (penalty scored); García (penalty missed)		Ferreira (penalty scored); Reza (penalty scored); Terres (penalty scored); Chávez (penalty scored); González (penalty missed); Montalvo (penalty scored)

Invierno 2002 winners

3rd title

=== Top scorers ===
Scorer	Goals	Team
(Argentina) Héctor Carlos Álvarez	23	Zacatepec
(Brazil) Josias Ferreira	15	Irapuato
(Argentina) Carlos Fretes	15	RS Zacatecas
(Argentina) Cristian Ariel Morales	13	Oaxaca
(Argentina) Martín Vilallonga	12	León
(Chile) Carlos Reyes	12	Nacional Tijuana

== Verano 2003 ==
=== Group league tables ===
==== Group 1 ====
Pos	Team	Pld	W	D	L	GF	GA	GD	Pts
1	León	18	12	4	2	37	19	+18	40
2	Celaya	18	7	6	5	32	25	+7	27
3	RS Zacatecas	18	7	5	6	23	27	−4	26
4	Cruz Azul Hidalgo	18	5	3	10	23	26	−3	18
5	Cobras Juárez	18	3	3	12	14	33	−19	12

Source: Ascenso MX
Rules for classification: 1st points; 2nd goal difference; 3rd goals scored; 4th head-to-head; 5th away goals scored; 6th draw

==== Group 2 ====
Pos	Team	Pld	W	D	L	GF	GA	GD	Pts
1	Tapatío	18	11	2	5	26	19	+7	35
2	Zacatepec	18	8	7	3	31	21	+10	31
3	Tabasco	18	7	5	6	23	23	0	26
4	Acapulco	18	4	3	11	22	36	−14	15
5	Jaguares de Tapachula	18	3	6	9	17	35	−18	15

Source: Ascenso MX
Rules for classification: 1st points; 2nd goal difference; 3rd goals scored; 4th head-to-head; 5th away goals scored; 6th draw

==== Group 3 ====
Pos	Team	Pld	W	D	L	GF	GA	GD	Pts
1	Irapuato	18	9	4	5	31	24	+7	31
2	Oaxaca	18	7	4	7	24	28	−4	25
3	Yucatán	18	5	7	6	23	20	+3	22
4	Durango	18	5	7	6	23	26	−3	22

Source: Ascenso MX
Rules for classification: 1st points; 2nd goal difference; 3rd goals scored; 4th head-to-head; 5th away goals scored; 6th draw

==== Group 4 ====
Pos	Team	Pld	W	D	L	GF	GA	GD	Pts
1	Cihuatlán	18	12	3	3	42	17	+25	39
2	Correcaminos UAT	18	10	3	5	32	28	+4	33
3	Atlético Mexiquense	18	6	4	8	24	20	+4	22
4	Tigrillos	18	4	4	10	23	31	−8	16
5	Nacional Tijuana	18	3	6	9	23	38	−15	15

Source: Ascenso MX
Rules for classification: 1st points; 2nd goal difference; 3rd goals scored; 4th head-to-head; 5th away goals scored; 6th draw

=== General league table ===
Pos	Team	Pld	W	D	L	GF	GA	GD	Pts
1	León	18	12	4	2	37	19	+18	40
2	Cihuatlán	18	12	3	3	42	17	+25	39
3	Tapatío	18	11	2	5	26	19	+7	35
4	Correcaminos UAT	18	10	3	5	32	28	+4	33
5	Zacatepec	18	8	7	3	31	21	+10	31
6	Irapuato	18	9	4	5	31	24	+7	31
7	Celaya	18	7	6	5	32	25	+7	27
8	Tabasco	18	7	5	6	23	23	0	26
9	RS Zacatecas	18	7	5	6	23	27	−4	26
10	Oaxaca	18	7	4	7	24	28	−4	25
11	Atlético Mexiquense	18	6	4	8	24	20	+4	22
12	Yucatán	18	5	7	6	23	20	+3	22
13	Durango	18	5	7	6	23	26	−3	22
14	Cruz Azul Hidalgo	18	5	3	10	23	26	−3	18
15	Tigrillos	18	4	4	10	23	31	−8	16
16	Nacional Tijuana	18	3	6	9	23	38	−15	15
17	Acapulco	18	4	3	11	22	36	−14	15
18	Jaguares de Tapachula	18	3	6	9	17	35	−18	15
19	Cobras Juárez	18	3	3	12	14	33	−19	12

Source: Ascenso MX
Rules for classification: 1st points; 2nd goal difference; 3rd goals scored; 4th head-to-head; 5th away goals scored; 6th draw

=== Results ===
Home \ Away	ACA	AMX	CIH	COB	CRH	DUR	IRA	CEL	LEO	NAT	OAX	TAB	JGT	RSZ	TAP	TGR	UAT	YUC	ZAC
Acapulco				0–1	2–1		0–2		1–0				7–1	1–1	1–1			1–5	
At. Mexiquense	2–1		1–2			3–0		1–1		0–1	0–2	4–0				3–0	2–0		1–1
Cihuatlán	3–0				2–0	2–1		2–2		4–0	5–2	0–0	3–0			5–0	1–2		
Cobras Juárez		0–0	0–1				3–2	2–1		1–1	0–1	0–1					1–2		1–1
Cruz Azul Hidalgo		1–2		2–0			1–2		1–2					1–3	2–1	1–1		1–0	2–2
Durango	2–1			1–0	0–1				1–2				1–1	0–0	1–0			2–3	
Irapuato		2–1	2–3			1–1		2–1		2–2	1–1	3–3					1–0		4–0
Celaya	0–0				3–2	3–3			2–3				3–0	3–0	3–1			2–1	
León		2–1	2–1	4–0			2–1			5–0	1–0	1–0					3–2		2–2
Nacional	5–2				2–0	1–2		2–2			2–3	0–0	2–3			1–3	2–3	0–0	
Oaxaca	1–0				2–6	1–1		0–0					2–0	5–1	0–1			0–0	
Tabasco	1–0				1–0	1–1		1–2			2–3		3–1	3–1		2–1	1–1	3–2	
Jaguares		1–1		4–2	1–1		2–0		1–3					0–0	1–2	1–1			
RS Zacatecas		2–1	2–0	2–1			0–2		2–2	2–2					1–0	2–1			3–1
Tapatío		2–1	0–4	2–0			3–1		2–1	3–1		2–1					3–1		1–0
Tigrillos	1–2			5–0		2–3	1–2	1–2	1–1		3–1				0–3		0–0		
Correcaminos UAT	4–1				1–0	4–3		3–2			1–0		1–0	3–1				3–3	
Yucatán		2–0	1–2	3–2			0–1		1–1				0–0	1–0	0–0	1–2			0–0
Zacatepec	5–2		2–2			0–0		1–0		3–2	4–0	1–0	3–0			1–0	4–1		

Updated to match(es) played on 18 May 2003. Source: Ascenso MX
Legend: Blue = home team win; Yellow = draw; Red = away team win.

=== Reclassification series ===
Team 1	Agg.	Team 2	1st leg	2nd leg
Oaxaca	4–4	Tabasco	2–2	2–2

==== First leg ====
21 May 2003	Tabasco	2–2	Oaxaca	Villahermosa, Tabasco
20:00		. http://www.ascensomx.net/cancha/informeArbitral/6438/eyJpZERpdmlzaW9uIjoiMTEiLCJpZFRlbXBvcmFkYSI6IjUzIiwiaWRUb3JuZW8iOiI1NCIsImlkQ2x1YmxvY2FsIjoxMjE1LCJpZENsdWJ2aXNpdGEiOjEzNDd9/informe-arbitral-tabasco-vs-oaxaca-recalificacion-ida-estadio-venustiano-carranza		Stadium: Estadio Olímpico de Villahermosa; Attendance: 5,000

==== Second leg ====
24 May 2003	Oaxaca	2–2 (4–4 agg.)	Tabasco	Oaxaca, Oaxaca
20:15		Report		Stadium: Estadio Benito Juárez; Attendance: 12,000

=== Liguilla ===
Quarter-finals
1	León	1	3	4
8	Tabasco	2	0	2
4	Correcaminos UAT (p.t.)	2	2	4
5	Zacatepec	2	2	4
2	Cihuatlán	3	5	8
7	Celaya	1	3	4
3	Tapatío	2	3	5
6	Irapuato	1	3	4

Semi-finals
1	León	1	2	3
4	Correcaminos UAT	1	1	2
2	Cihuatlán	3	3	6
3	Tapatío	4	6	10

Final
1	León	1	2	3
3	Tapatío	1	1	2

- (p.t.) The team was classified by its best position in the general table

==== Quarter-finals ====
Team 1	Agg.	Team 2	1st leg	2nd leg
León	4–2	Tabasco	1–2	3–0
Cihuatlán	8–4	Celaya	3–1	5–3
Tapatío	5–4	Irapuato	2–1	3–3
Correcaminos UAT	4–4	Zacatepec	2–2	2–2

===== First leg =====
28 May 2003	Irapuato	1–2	Tapatío	Irapuato, Guanajuato
20:30		Report		Stadium: Estadio Sergio León Chávez

29 May 2003	Zacatepec	2–2	Correcaminos UAT	Zacatepec, Morelos
17:00		Report		Stadium: Estadio Agustín Coruco Díaz

29 May 2003	Tabasco	2–1	León	Villahermosa, Tabasco
20:00		Report		Stadium: Estadio Olímpico de Villahermosa

29 May 2003	Celaya	1–3	Cihuatlán	Celaya, Guanajuato
20:00		Report		Stadium: Estadio Miguel Alemán Valdés

===== Second leg =====
31 May 2003	Tapatío	3–3 (5–4 agg.)	Irapuato	Guadalajara, Jalisco
19:30		Report		Stadium: Estadio Jalisco

1 June 2003	Correcaminos UAT	2–2 (4–4 agg.)	Zacatepec	Ciudad Victoria, Tamaulipas
12:00		Report		Stadium: Estadio Marte R. Gómez

1 June 2003	Cihuatlán	5–3 (8–4 agg.)	Celaya	Cihuatlán, Jalisco
12:00		Report		Stadium: Estadio El Llanito

1 June 2003	León	3–0 (4–2 agg.)	Tabasco	León, Guanajuato
12:00		Report		Stadium: Estadio León

==== Semi-finals ====
Team 1	Agg.	Team 2	1st leg	2nd leg
León	3–2	Correcaminos UAT	1–1	2–1
Cihuatlán	6–10	Tapatío	3–4	3–6

===== First leg =====
5 June 2003	Correcaminos UAT	1–1	León	Ciudad Victoria, Tamaulipas
17:00		Report		Stadium: Estadio Marte R. Gómez

5 June 2003	Tapatío	4–3	Cihuatlán	Guadalajara, Jalisco
19:30		Report		Stadium: Estadio Jalisco

===== Second leg =====
8 June 2003	León	2–1 (3–2 agg.)	Correcaminos UAT	León, Guanajuato
12:00		Report		Stadium: Estadio León

8 June 2003	Cihuatlán	3–6 (6–10 agg.)	Tapatío	Cihuatlán, Jalisco
12:00		Report		Stadium: Estadio El Llanito

==== Final ====
Team 1	Agg.	Team 2	1st leg	2nd leg
León	3–2	Tapatío	1–1	2–1

===== First leg =====
12 June 2003	Tapatío	1–1	León	Guadalajara, Jalisco
19:30	Gutiérrez 25'	Report	Yegros 25'	Stadium: Estadio Jalisco; Attendance: 30,000; Referee: Gilberto Alcalá

===== Second leg =====
15 June 2003	León	2–1 (3–2 agg.)	Tapatío	León, Guanajuato
12:00	Colman 83', 85'	Report	Salcido 61'	Stadium: Estadio León; Attendance: 40,000; Referee: Marco Antonio Rodríguez

Verano 2003 winners:

1st title

=== Top scorers ===
Scorer	Goals	Team
(Paraguay) Julio César Yegros	9	León
(Argentina) Héctor Carlos Álvarez	8	Zacatepec
(Brazil) Adelino Batista	7	Correcaminos UAT
(Mexico) Ulises Mendivil	5	Cihuatlán
(Brazil) Valtencir Gómes	5	Tigrillos

== Relegation table ==
P	Team	Pts	G	Ave.
1	León	66	37	1.7838
2	Cihuatlán	65	37	1.7568
3	Irapuato	188	113	1.6637
4	Tapatío	184	113	1.6283
5	Oaxaca	57	37	1.5405
6	Celaya	115	75	1.5333
7	Correcaminos UAT	173	113	1.5310
8	Zacatepec	164	113	1.4513
9	RS Zacatecas	153	113	1.3540
10	Atlético Mexiquense	147	113	1.3009
11	Acapulco	145	113	1.2832
12	Nacional Tijuana	141	113	1.2478
13	Durango	141	113	1.2478
14	Tigrillos	137	113	1.2124
15	Yucatán	137	113	1.2124
16	Cruz Azul Hidalgo	135	113	1.1947
17	Tabasco	134	113	1.1858
18	Cobras Juárez	133	113	1.1770
19	Jaguares de Tapachula	82	75	1.0933
*	Gavilanes	122	95	1.2842

== Campeón de Ascenso 2003 ==
The promotion final faced Irapuato against León to determine the winner of the First Division Promotion. Irapuato was the winner. Before the celebration of the games a controversy was unleashed, because it was made believe that the board of the Club Leon had acquired the Irapuato. Subsequently, an armed command supposedly paid by the owners of the León occupied the Sergio León Chávez stadium, a few days later the fans recovered the building accompanied by police and military elements.

Team 1	Agg.	Team 2	1st leg	2nd leg
Irapuato	3–1	León	2–1	1–0

=== First leg ===
18 June 2003	León	1–2	Irapuato	León, Guanajuato
20:30	U. González	Report	A. González; Gers	Stadium: Estadio León; Attendance: 35,000

=== Second leg ===
21 June 2003	Irapuato	1–0 (3–1 agg.)	León	Irapuato, Guanajuato
19:00	Ferreira 79'	Report		Stadium: Estadio Sergio León Chávez; Attendance: 26,000

Champions

2nd title
