= 2003–04 Primera División A season =

Season of a Mexican football league

Primera División A
- Season: 2003–04
- Champions: Apertura: Dorados (1st Title); Clausura: León (2nd title)
- Promoted: Dorados
- Relegated: Salamanca; Jaguares de Tapachula
- Top goalscorer: Apertura: Héctor Carlos Álvarez (8); Clausura: Francisco Bravo Bravo (18)

Primera División A (Méxican First A Division) is a Mexican football tournament. This season was composed of Apertura 2003 and Clausura 2004. Dorados de Sinaloa was the winner of the promotion to First Division after winning León in the promotion playoff. '

== Changes for the 2003–04 season ==
- Cihuatlán was bought by new owners, for that reason the team was relocated to Culiacán and renamed Dorados de Sinaloa.
- Yucatán was relocated to Playa del Carmen and renamed Inter Riviera Maya.
- Chapulineros de Oaxaca was relocated to Tlaxcala and renamed Guerreros de Tlaxcala.
- C.D. Guadalajara already had two subsidiary teams in the division (Tapatío and Nacional Tijuana), for this reason it was detached from the National Tijuana, which was bought by new owners who renamed to Mérida F.C. and relocated the team at Mérida, Yucatán.
- Real Sociedad de Zacatecas was moved to Altamira and renamed Estudiantes de Santander.
- Cruz Azul Hidalgo was relocated to Oaxaca and changed renamed Cruz Azul Oaxaca.
- Tigrillos was relocated to Mexico City.
- A new team called Trotamundos Tijuana was created from the franchise belonging to Colibríes de Morelos, which had been confiscated by the Femexfut.
- Delfines de Coatzacoalcos was promoted from Second Division.

=== Changes for the Clausura 2004 ===
- After violent incidents in a game, Zacatepec owner moved the team to Xochitepec and renamed as Leones de Morelos. This fact represented the end of the club's original franchise.
- Trotamundos Tijuana was bought by Pemex, the new owner company moved the team to Salamanca and renamed Petroleros de Salamanca.
- Inter Riviera Maya was relocated to Córdoba and it was renamed Azucareros de Córdoba, however, the team played most of its games in Mexico City.

== Stadiums and locations ==
Club	Stadium	Capacity	City
Acapulco	Unidad Deportiva Acapulco	13,000	Acapulco, Guerrero
Atlético Mexiquense	Nemesio Díez	35,000	Toluca, State of Mexico
Celaya	Miguel Alemán Valdés	25,000	Celaya, Guanajuato
Coatzacoalcos	Rafael Hernández Ochoa	4,800	Coatzacoalcos, Veracruz
Cobras Juárez	Olímpico Benito Juárez	22,000	Ciudad Juárez, Chihuahua
Correcaminos UAT	Marte R. Gómez	20,000	Ciudad Victoria, Tamaulipas
Cruz Azul Oaxaca	Benito Juárez	15,000	Oaxaca, Oaxaca
Dorados	Carlos González y González	23,000	Culiacán, Sinaloa
Durango	Francisco Zarco	15,000	Durango, Durango
Estudiantes de Santander	Lázaro Cárdenas / Altamira	3,000 / 13,500	Altamira, Tamaulipas
Inter Riviera Maya	Mario Villanueva Madrid	10,000	Playa del Carmen, Quintana Roo
Jaguares de Tapachula	Olímpico de Tapachula	10,000	Tapachula, Chiapas
León	Nou Camp	35,000	León, Guanajuato
Mérida F.C.	Carlos Iturralde	25,000	Mérida, Yucatán
Tabasco	Olímpico de Villahermosa	12,000	Villahermosa, Tabasco
Tapatío	Anacleto Macías Tolán	3,500	Guadalajara, Jalisco
Tigrillos	Azteca	105,000	Mexico City
Trotamundos Tijuana	Cerro Colorado	12,000	Tijuana, Baja California
Tlaxcala	Tlahuicole	12,000	Tlaxcala, Tlaxcala
Zacatepec	Agustín Coruco Díaz	18,000	Zacatepec, Morelos

=== Clausura 2004 new teams ===
Club	Stadium	Capacity	City
Córdoba	Rafael Murillo Vidal / C.A.R.	4,000 / 1,000	Córdoba, Veracruz
Leones de Morelos	Mariano Matamoros	18,000	Cuernavaca, Morelos
Salamanca	Olímpico Sección 24	10,000	Salamanca, Guanajuato

Location of teams in the 2003-2004 Primera División A

== Apertura 2003 ==
=== Group league tables ===
==== Group 1 ====
Pos	Team	Pld	W	D	L	GF	GA	GD	Pts
1	Atlético Mexiquense	19	8	4	7	32	31	+1	28
2	Mérida F.C.	19	6	6	7	29	32	−3	24
3	Estudiantes Santander	19	6	3	10	25	29	−4	21
4	Trotamundos	19	5	5	9	20	26	−6	20
5	Tlaxcala	19	2	8	9	20	37	−17	14

Source: Ascenso MX
Rules for classification: 1st points; 2nd goal difference; 3rd goals scored; 4th head-to-head; 5th away goals scored; 6th draw

==== Group 2 ====
Pos	Team	Pld	W	D	L	GF	GA	GD	Pts
1	Correcaminos UAT	19	8	5	6	35	25	+10	29
2	Tigrillos	19	7	8	4	23	23	0	29
3	Cruz Azul Oaxaca	19	8	2	9	36	32	+4	26
4	Durango	19	7	5	7	27	33	−6	26
5	Tapatío	19	4	4	11	21	37	−16	16

Source: Ascenso MX
Rules for classification: 1st points; 2nd goal difference; 3rd goals scored; 4th head-to-head; 5th away goals scored; 6th draw

==== Group 3 ====
Pos	Team	Pld	W	D	L	GF	GA	GD	Pts
1	Zacatepec	19	12	4	3	38	21	+17	40
2	Cobras Juárez	19	12	0	7	36	25	+11	36
3	Coatzacoalcos	19	9	7	3	23	16	+7	34
4	León	19	6	4	9	36	37	−1	22
5	Inter Riviera Maya	19	2	6	11	19	41	−22	12

Source: Ascenso MX
Rules for classification: 1st points; 2nd goal difference; 3rd goals scored; 4th head-to-head; 5th away goals scored; 6th draw

==== Group 4 ====
Pos	Team	Pld	W	D	L	GF	GA	GD	Pts
1	Dorados	19	10	6	3	43	28	+15	36
2	Celaya	19	11	3	5	38	24	+14	36
3	Tabasco	19	10	6	3	35	25	+10	36
4	Acapulco	19	7	5	7	26	24	+2	26
5	Jaguares de Tapachula	19	3	3	13	21	39	−18	12

Source: Ascenso MX
Rules for classification: 1st points; 2nd goal difference; 3rd goals scored; 4th head-to-head; 5th away goals scored; 6th draw

=== General league table ===
Pos	Team	Pld	W	D	L	GF	GA	GD	Pts
1	Zacatepec	19	12	4	3	38	21	+17	40
2	Dorados	19	10	6	3	43	28	+15	36
3	Celaya	19	11	3	5	38	24	+14	36
4	Cobras Juárez	19	12	0	7	36	25	+11	36
5	Tabasco	19	10	6	3	35	25	+10	36
6	Coatzacoalcos	19	9	7	3	23	16	+7	34
7	Correcaminos UAT	19	8	5	6	35	25	+10	29
8	Tigrillos	19	7	8	4	23	23	0	29
9	Atlético Mexiquense	19	8	4	7	32	31	+1	28
10	Cruz Azul Oaxaca	19	8	2	9	36	32	+4	26
11	Acapulco	19	7	5	7	26	24	+2	26
12	Durango	19	7	5	7	27	33	−6	26
13	Mérida F.C.	19	6	6	7	29	32	−3	24
14	León	19	6	4	9	36	37	−1	22
15	Estudiantes Santander	19	6	3	10	25	29	−4	21
16	Trotamundos	19	5	5	9	20	26	−6	20
17	Tapatío	19	4	4	11	21	37	−16	16
18	Tlaxcala	19	2	8	9	20	37	−17	14
19	Jaguares de Tapachula	19	3	3	13	21	39	−18	12
20	Inter Riviera Maya	19	2	6	11	19	41	−22	12

Source: Ascenso MX
Rules for classification: 1st points; 2nd goal difference; 3rd goals scored; 4th head-to-head; 5th away goals scored; 6th draw

=== Results ===
Home \ Away	ACA	AMX	CEL	COA	COB	CRO	DOS	DUR	EST	IRM	JAG	LEO	MER	TAB	TAP	TGR	TLA	TRO	UAT	ZAC
Acapulco		1–2	0–2	0–0			2–1				2–1					0–1	3–1		1–2	2–3
At. Mexiquense			1–2		0–3		2–4				1–0	0–1				1–1	1–1	5–0	3–2	3–1
Celaya					1–0		4–1				5–1	1–0	2–2			0–0	4–0	1–1	1–0	1–0
Coatzacoalcos		1–0	4–2				1–1				1–0	2–0				0–0	2–1		1–1	1–1
Cobras Juárez	1–2			2–1		3–2		2–1	3–1	5–1			2–0	1–3	1–0					
Cruz Azul Oaxaca	0–2	5–0	4–1	2–1				0–1			3–1			0–2					0–1	0–1
Dorados					4–2	3–1		4–1	2–1	3–0		4–3		0–0	4–0					
Durango	3–2	3–3	2–1	0–3							1–0					0–0	3–3		3–2	1–1
Est. Santander	1–0	1–2	3–2	1–0		3–4		1–0			1–0			1–1				0–1		2–3
Inter Riviera Maya	1–2	0–4	1–3	1–1		4–7		0–2	1–1					0–1	3–0			2–1		
Jaguares					1–2		2–3			0–0		4–5	2–2			2–1	2–1	0–3	2–2	1–2
León	3–3				1–0	0–1		3–0	3–2	2–2			3–4	5–1	2–2					
Mérida F.C.	1–1	2–0		1–2		3–2	1–1	2–0	1–4	3–0				2–4	2–1			1–0		
Tabasco	1–1	1–1	3–2	1–1				3–2			1–2						3–1		2–1	1–3
Tapatío	0–2	1–0	1–3	2–3		4–2		0–1	1–1		3–0			1–2				1–0		
Tigrillos					2–1	0–1	2–1		2–1	1–1		2–1	1–0	1–5	4–3					
Tlaxcala					1–2	1–1	1–1		1–0	1–1		2–2	1–1		1–1	1–0				
Trotamundos	0–0			0–1		1–1	0–1	3–1				1–0		0–0		2–2	5–1			
Correcaminos UAT					1–4		3–3		2–0	1–0		3–0	2–1		1–1	0–0	3–0	7–1		
Zacatepec					2–0		2–2			3–0		3–2	3–0		5–0	3–3	2–1	1–0	2–1	

Updated to match(es) played on 23 November 2003. Source: Ascenso MX
Legend: Blue = home team win; Yellow = draw; Red = away team win.

=== Reclasification series ===
Team 1	Agg.	Team 2	1st leg	2nd leg
Coatzacoalcos	1–1	Tigrilos	1–1	0–0
Tabasco	4–3	Mérida F.C.	2–0	2–3

==== First leg ====
26 November 2003	Tigrillos	1–1	Coatzacoalcos	Mexico City
12:00		Report		Stadium: Estadio Azteca

26 November 2003	Mérida F.C.	0–2	Tabasco	Mérida, Yucatán
20:45		Report		Stadium: Estadio Carlos Iturralde

==== Second leg ====
29 November 2003	Coatzacoalcos	0–0 (1–1 agg.)	Tigrillos	Coatzacoalcos, Veracruz
15:30		Report		Stadium: Estadio Rafael Hernández Ochoa

29 November 2003	Tabasco	2–3 (4–3 agg.)	Mérida F.C.	Villahermosa, Tabasco
16:00		Report		Stadium: Estadio Olímpico de Villahermosa

=== Liguilla ===
Quarter-finals
2	Dorados	2	2	4
7	Correcaminos UAT	1	1	2
3	Celaya (p.t.)	0	1	1
6	Coatzacoalcos	0	1	1
1	Zacatepec (p.t.)	1	2	3
8	Atlético Mexiquense	1	2	3
4	Cobras	1	4	5
5	Tabasco	2	1	3

Semi-finals
2	Dorados (p.t.)	1	1	2
3	Celaya	2	0	2
1	Zacatepec	0	0	0
4	Cobras	1	1	2

Final
2	Dorados (g.g.)	2	4	6
4	Cobras	3	3	6

- (p.t.) The team was classified by its best position in the general table

==== Quarter-finals ====
Team 1	Agg.	Team 2	1st leg	2nd leg
Dorados	4–2	Correcaminos UAT	2–1	2–1
Celaya (p.t.)	1–1	Coatzacoalcos	0–0	1–1
Zacatepec (p.t.)	3–3	Atlético Mexiquense	1–1	2–2
Cobras	5–3	Tabasco	1–2	4–1

===== First leg =====
3 December 2003	Atlético Mexiquense	1–1	Zacatepec	Toluca, State of Mexico
12:00		Report		Stadium: Estadio Nemesio Díez

3 December 2003	Correcaminos UAT	1–2	Dorados	Ciudad Victoria, Tamaulipas
15:00		Report		Stadium: Estadio Marte R. Gómez

3 December 2003	Tabasco	2–1	Cobras	Villahermosa, Tabasco
20:00		Report		Stadium: Estadio Olímpico de Villahermosa

3 December 2003	Coatzacoalcos	0–0	Celaya	Coatzacoalcos, Veracruz
20:30		Report		Stadium: Estadio Rafael Hernández Ochoa

===== Second leg =====
6 December 2003	Zacatepec	2–2 (3–3 agg.)	Atlético Mexiquense	Zacatepec, Morelos
16:00		Report		Stadium: Estadio Agustín Coruco Díaz

6 December 2003	Cobras	4–1 (5–3 agg.)	Tabasco	Ciudad Juárez, Chihuahua
17:00		Report		Stadium: Estadio Olímpico Benito Juárez

6 December 2003	Dorados	2–1 (4–2 agg.)	Correcaminos UAT	Culiacán, Sinaloa
19:00		Report		Stadium: Estadio Carlos González y González

6 December 2003	Celaya	1–1 (1–1 agg.)	Coatzacoalcos	Celaya, Guanajuato
20:00		Report		Stadium: Estadio Miguel Alemán Valdés

==== Semi-finals ====
Team 1	Agg.	Team 2	1st leg	2nd leg
Dorados (p.t.)	2–2	Celaya	1–2	1–0
Zacatepec	0–2	Cobras	0–1	0–1

===== First leg =====
10 December 2003	Cobras	1–0	Zacatepec	Ciudad Juárez, Chihuahua
19:00		Report		Stadium: Estadio Olímpico Benito Juárez

10 December 2003	Celaya	2–1	Dorados	Celaya, Guanajuato
20:00		Report		Stadium: Estadio Miguel Alemán Valdés

===== Second leg =====
13 December 2003	Zacatepec	0–1 (0–2 agg.)	Cobras	Zacatepec, Morelos
16:00		Report		Stadium: Estadio Agustín Coruco Díaz

13 December 2003	Dorados	1–0 (2–2 agg.)	Celaya	Culiacán, Sinaloa
19:00		Report		Stadium: Estadio Carlos González y González

==== Final ====
Team 1	Agg.	Team 2	1st leg	2nd leg
Dorados (g.g.)	6–6	Cobras	4–3	2–3

===== First leg =====
17 December 2003	Dorados	4–3	Cobras	Culiacán, Sinaloa
20:00		Report		Stadium: Estadio Carlos González y González

===== Second leg =====
20 December 2003	Cobras	3–2 (6–6 agg.)	Dorados	Ciudad Juárez, Chihuahua
19:00		Report		Stadium: Estadio Olímpico Benito Juárez

Apertura 2003 winners

1st title

== Clausura 2004 ==
=== Group league tables ===
==== Group 1 ====
Pos	Team	Pld	W	D	L	GF	GA	GD	Pts
1	Mérida F.C.	19	8	5	6	34	29	+5	29
2	Atlético Mexiquense	19	7	7	5	28	24	+4	28
3	Estudiantes Santander	19	7	5	7	24	21	+3	26
4	Salamanca	19	5	6	8	30	37	−7	21
5	Tlaxcala	19	6	2	11	29	34	−5	20

Source: Ascenso MX
Rules for classification: 1st points; 2nd goal difference; 3rd goals scored; 4th head-to-head; 5th away goals scored; 6th draw

==== Group 2 ====
Pos	Team	Pld	W	D	L	GF	GA	GD	Pts
1	Tigrillos	19	7	7	5	28	24	+4	28
2	Cruz Azul Oaxaca	19	7	7	5	21	25	−4	28
3	Correcaminos UAT	19	6	3	10	18	31	−13	21
4	Tapatío	19	5	4	10	20	27	−7	19
5	Durango	19	3	7	9	21	31	−10	16

Source: Ascenso MX
Rules for classification: 1st points; 2nd goal difference; 3rd goals scored; 4th head-to-head; 5th away goals scored; 6th draw

==== Group 3 ====
Pos	Team	Pld	W	D	L	GF	GA	GD	Pts
1	León	19	12	3	4	42	29	+13	39
2	Leones Morelos	19	8	4	7	43	35	+8	28
3	Córdoba	19	8	3	8	23	30	−7	27
4	Cobras Juárez	19	7	4	8	25	24	+1	25
5	Coatzacoalcos	19	6	5	8	32	37	−5	23

Source: Ascenso MX
Rules for classification: 1st points; 2nd goal difference; 3rd goals scored; 4th head-to-head; 5th away goals scored; 6th draw

==== Group 4 ====
Pos	Team	Pld	W	D	L	GF	GA	GD	Pts
1	Dorados	19	10	6	3	32	17	+15	36
2	Tabasco	19	9	7	3	42	27	+15	34
3	Celaya	19	9	6	4	36	27	+9	33
4	Jaguares de Tapachula	19	7	3	9	24	26	−2	24
5	Acapulco	19	5	2	12	24	41	−17	17

Source: Ascenso MX
Rules for classification: 1st points; 2nd goal difference; 3rd goals scored; 4th head-to-head; 5th away goals scored; 6th draw

=== General league table ===
Pos	Team	Pld	W	D	L	GF	GA	GD	Pts
1	León	19	12	3	4	42	29	+13	39
2	Dorados	19	10	6	3	32	17	+15	36
3	Tabasco	19	9	7	3	42	27	+15	34
4	Celaya	19	9	6	4	36	27	+9	33
5	Mérida F.C.	19	8	5	6	34	29	+5	29
6	Leones Morelos	19	8	4	7	43	35	+8	28
7	Atlético Mexiquense	19	7	7	5	28	24	+4	28
8	Tigrillos	19	7	7	5	28	24	+4	28
9	Cruz Azul Oaxaca	19	7	7	5	21	25	−4	28
10	Córdoba	19	8	3	8	23	30	−7	27
11	Estudiantes Santander	19	7	5	7	24	21	+3	26
12	Cobras Juárez	19	7	4	8	25	24	+1	25
13	Jaguares de Tapachula	19	7	3	9	24	26	−2	24
14	Coatzacoalcos	19	6	5	8	32	37	−5	23
15	Salamanca	19	5	6	8	30	37	−7	21
16	Correcaminos UAT	19	6	3	10	18	31	−13	21
17	Tlaxcala	19	6	2	11	29	34	−5	20
18	Tapatío	19	5	4	10	20	27	−7	19
19	Acapulco	19	5	2	12	24	41	−17	17
20	Durango	19	3	7	9	21	31	−10	16

Source: Ascenso MX
Rules for classification: 1st points; 2nd goal difference; 3rd goals scored; 4th head-to-head; 5th away goals scored; 6th draw

=== Results ===
Home \ Away	ACA	AMX	CEL	COA	COB	CRO	DOS	DUR	EST	CRD	JAG	LEO	MER	TAB	TAP	TGR	TLA	SAL	UAT	LMR
Acapulco					0–2	1–2		4–1	2–1	3–0		2–5	1–3	0–3	1–0				1–1	
At. Mexiquense	2–3			4–1		1–2		0–0	1–0	4–0			1–1	2–1	2–1					
Celaya	2–1	2–2		3–2		2–1		2–2	1–0	2–2				1–1	2–3					
Coatzacoalcos	3–0				1–1	0–0		3–2	1–3	1–2			3–2	2–2	3–0			2–2		
Cobras Juárez		2–0	0–1				1–1				1–0	2–4				2–2	2–1	1–3	1–2	0–1
Cruz Azul Oaxaca					0–3		1–2		0–0	1–1		1–3	2–1		1–1	0–0	2–2	2–0		
Dorados	2–1	1–1	0–0	3–1							2–0		4–1			2–0	2–1	4–1	2–0	3–0
Durango					0–2	1–2	0–0		2–1	2–0		1–1	1–2	2–2	1–1			1–1		
Est. Santander					3–2		1–1			0–0		1–2	4–2		1–0	3–0	2–1		1–1	
Córdoba					1–0		3–0				2–1	1–2	1–0			1–3	1–3		3–2	1–1
Jaguares	3–1	0–1	2–1	2–2		0–1		2–1	2–0					2–5	1–1					
León		1–0	3–4	2–0			1–1				0–2					3–3	2–1	5–1	4–0	2–1
Mérida F.C.			1–1		0–0						2–1	5–0				2–2	2–0		1–1	3–1
Tabasco					4–1	2–2	3–2		1–1	2–3		2–0	4–2		4–2	0–0		3–2		
Tapatío					0–2		1–0			3–1		1–2	0–1			0–0	4–2		0–1	2–1
Tigrillos	2–2	0–1	0–4	4–0				1–0			2–1						2–0	1–0	5–0	1–3
Tlaxcala	2–0	4–1	1–0	0–3				1–2			3–1			1–2				2–3	2–1	2–2
Salamanca		2–2	2–4						0–1	2–1	1–1		2–3		1–0				3–0	3–3
Correcaminos UAT	2–0	0–0	0–1	1–2		0–1		2–0			0–2			1–0						4–3
Leones Morelos	5–1	3–3	4–3	4–2		5–0		4–2	2–1		0–1			1–1						

Updated to match(es) played on 1 May 2004. Source: Ascenso MX
Legend: Blue = home team win; Yellow = draw; Red = away team win.

=== Reclasification series ===
Team 1	Agg.	Team 2	1st leg	2nd leg
Celaya	4–1	Cruz Azul Oaxaca	1–1	3–0

==== First leg ====
5 May 2004	Cruz Azul Oaxaca	1–1	Celaya	Oaxaca, Oaxaca
20:00	Orozco 58'	Report	Gerk 9'	Stadium: Estadio Benito Juárez; Attendance: 5,000; Referee: Adolfo Aquino Benitez

==== Second leg ====
8 May 2004	Celaya	3–0 (4–1 agg.)	Cruz Azul Oaxaca	Celaya, Guanajuato
20:00	Gerk 7'; García 81'; González 66'	Report		Stadium: Estadio Miguel Alemán Valdés; Attendance: 15,000; Referee: Francisco Javier Caspeta Aranda

=== Liguilla ===
Quarter-finals
1	León	2	2	4
8	Tigrillos	0	2	2
3	Tabasco	2	0	2
6	Leones Morelos	3	1	4
2	Dorados	2	2	4
7	Atlético Mexiquense	2	1	3
4	Celaya	1	2	3
5	Mérida	4	1	5

Semi-finals
1	León	5	2	7
6	Leones Morelos	2	2	4
2	Dorados	1	2	3
5	Mérida	1	0	1

Final
1	León	1	1	2
2	Dorados	0	1	1

==== Quarter-finals ====
Team 1	Agg.	Team 2	1st leg	2nd leg
León	4–2	Tigrillos	2–0	2–2
Dorados	4–3	Atlético Mexiquense	2–2	2–1
Tabasco	2–4	Leones Morelos	2–3	0–1
Celaya	3–5	Mérida	1–4	2–1

===== First leg =====
12 May 2004	Tigrillos	0–2	León	Mexico City
12:00		Report	Álvarez 26'; Romero 88'	Stadium: Estadio Azteca; Attendance: 300; Referee: Adolfo Aquino Benítez

12 May 2004	Mérida	4–1	Celaya	Mérida, Yucatán
15:00	Olsina 25', 39', 85'; Padilla 67'	Report	Gerk 73'	Stadium: Estadio Carlos Iturralde; Attendance: 4,000; Referee: Jaime Luis Molina Sánchez

12 May 2004	Atlético Mexiquense	2–2	Dorados	Toluca, State of Mexico
15:00	Caetano 7'; Núñez 41'	Report	Castañeda 10'; Esquivel 29'	Stadium: Estadio Nemesio Díez; Attendance: 500; Referee: Manuel Ernesto Glower Guerra

12 May 2004	Leones Morelos	3–2	Tabasco	Xochitepec, Morelos
17:00	Estévez 22'; Hernández 24'; Montoya 89'	Report	Padilla 10'; González 65'	Stadium: Estadio Mariano Matamoros; Attendance: 1,000; Referee: Armando Rosales Rodríguez

===== Second leg =====
15 May 2004	León	2–2 (4–2 agg.)	Tigrillos	León, Guanajuato
19:00	Sarria 21'; Álvarez 37'	Report	Fernández 20'; Torres 44'	Stadium: Estadio León; Attendance: 17,000; Referee: Paul Enrique Delgadillo Haro

15 May 2004	Tabasco	0–1 (2–4 agg.)	Leones Morelos	Villahermosa, Tabasco
20:00		Report	Salcedo 36'	Stadium: Estadio Olímpico de Villahermosa; Referee: Roberto García Orozco

15 May 2004	Celaya	2–1 (5–3 agg.)	Mérida	Celaya, Guanajuato
20:00	García 32'; Pacheco 87'	Report	Prieto 88'	Stadium: Estadio Miguel Alemán Valdés; Attendance: 15,000; Referee: Oliver Enrique Quiroz Díaz

15 May 2004	Dorados	2–1 (4–3 agg.)	Atlético Mexiquense	Culiacán, Sinaloa
20:00		Report		Stadium: Estadio Carlos González y González

==== Semi-finals ====
Team 1	Agg.	Team 2	1st leg	2nd leg
León	7–4	Leones Morelos	5–2	2–2
Dorados	3–1	Mérida	1–1	2–0

===== First leg =====
19 May 2004	Mérida	1–1	Dorados	Mérida, Yucatán
15:00	Leyva 13'	Report	Giménez 50'	Stadium: Estadio Carlos Iturralde; Attendance: 8,000; Referee: Hugo León Guajardo

19 May 2004	Leones Morelos	2–5	León	Xochitepec, Morelos
17:00	Bravo 21'; Cortés 86'	Report	Romero 27'; Peralta 29', 37'; Álvarez 55', 88'	Stadium: Estadio Mariano Matamoros; Attendance: 10,000; Referee: Jorge Eduardo Gasso Flores

===== Second leg =====
22 May 2004	León	2–2 (7–4 agg.)	Leones Morelos	León, Guanajuato
19:00	Álvarez 35', 44'	Report	Álvarez 11' (og); Díaz 85'	Stadium: Estadio León; Attendance: 15,000; Referee: Sergio Fernando Silva Rigau

22 May 2004	Dorados	2–0 (3–1 agg.)	Mérida	Culiacán, Sinaloa
20:00	Giménez 18', 86'	Report		Stadium: Estadio Carlos González y González; Attendance: 12,000; Referee: Marco Antonio Rodríguez Moreno

==== Final ====
Team 1	Agg.	Team 2	1st leg	2nd leg
León	2–1	Dorados	1–0	1–1

===== First leg =====
26 May 2004	Dorados	0–1	León	Culiacán, Sinaloa
20:00		Report	Perrone 88'	Stadium: Estadio Carlos González y González; Attendance: 14,000; Referee: Mauricio Rafael Morales Ovalle

===== Second leg =====
29 May 2004	León	1–1 (2–1 agg.)	Dorados	León, Guanajuato
19:00	Perrone 61'	Report	Mercado 58' (og)	Stadium: Estadio León; Attendance: 50,000; Referee: José Abramo Lira

Clausura 2004 winners:

2nd title

== Relegation table ==
Pos.	Team	Pld.	Pts.	Ave.
16.	Cruz Azul Oaxaca	113	136	1.2035
17.	Tlaxcala	75	88	1.1733
18.	Acapulco	113	125	1.1062
19.	Salamanca	38	41	1.0789
20.	Jaguares	113	121	1.0708

== Campeón de Ascenso 2004 ==
The promotion final faced Dorados against León to determine the winner of the First Division Promotion. Dorados was the winner.

Team 1	Agg.	Team 2	1st leg	2nd leg
Dorados	4–3	León	2–2	2–1

=== First leg ===
2 June 2004	León	2–2	Dorados	León, Guanajuato
20:00	Romero 43'; Perrone 83'	Report	Molina 24'; Rojas 43'	Stadium: Estadio León; Attendance: 20,000; Referee: Manuel Ernesto Glower Guerra

=== Second leg ===
6 June 2004	Dorados	2–1 (4–3 agg.)	León	Culiacán, Sinaloa
20:00	Valdez 15'; Domínguez 65'	Report	Guerra 52'	Stadium: Estadio Carlos González y González; Attendance: 14,000; Referee: Armando Archundia Tellez

Champions

1st title
