= Primera División de México Invierno 2000 =

Primera División de México
- Season: 2000−01
- Champions: Morelia (1st title)
- Champions' Cup: Morelia
- Copa Libertadores: Cruz Azul
- CONCACAF Giants Cup: América; Guadalajara
- Top goalscorer: Jared Borgetti (18 goals)

Primera División de México (Mexican First Division) Invierno 2000 is a Mexican football tournament - one of two short tournaments that take up the entire year to determine the champion(s) of Mexican football. It began on Saturday, July 29, 2000, and ran until November 18, when the regular season ended. Irapuato was promoted to the Primera División de México thus, Toros Neza was relegated to the Primera División A. Morelia defeated Toluca in the final and were crowned Champions for the first, and to date, the only time.

== Clubs ==
Location of the Primera División Invierno 2000 teams

Team	City	Stadium
América	Mexico City	Azteca
Atlante	Mexico City	Azul
Atlas	Guadalajara, Jalisco	Jalisco
Celaya	Celaya, Guanajuato	Miguel Alemán Valdés
Cruz Azul	Mexico City	Azul
Guadalajara	Guadalajara, Jalisco	Jalisco
Irapuato	Irapuato, Guanajuato	Sergio León Chávez
León	León, Guanajuato	León
Morelia	Morelia, Michoacán	Morelos
Monterrey	Monterrey, Nuevo León	Tecnológico
Necaxa	Mexico City	Azteca
Pachuca	Pachuca, Hidalgo	Hidalgo
Puebla	Puebla, Puebla	Cuauhtémoc
Santos Laguna	Torreón, Coahuila	Corona
Toluca	Toluca, State of Mexico	Nemesio Díez
UAG	Zapopan, Jalisco	Tres de Marzo
UANL	San Nicolás de los Garza, Nuevo León	Universitario
UNAM	Mexico City	Olímpico Universitario

== Regular phase ==
Group 1
Pos	Team	Pld	W	D	L	GF	GA	GD	Pts	Qualification
1	Cruz Azul	17	10	3	4	34	21	+13	33	Directly qualified to the Liguilla (Playoffs)
2	Toluca	17	9	3	5	32	26	+6	30	Directly qualified to the Liguilla (Playoffs)
3	Morelia	17	7	6	4	29	24	+5	27	Qualified for the Repechage
4	León	17	4	6	7	27	33	−6	18	
5	Atlante	17	3	8	6	22	28	−6	17	

Source: MedioTiempo

Group 2
Pos	Team	Pld	W	D	L	GF	GA	GD	Pts	Qualification
1	Atlas	17	6	7	4	35	29	+6	25	Directly qualified to the Liguilla (Playoffs)
2	Irapuato	17	6	7	4	28	26	+2	25	Qualified for the Repechage
3	UANL	17	6	6	5	23	23	0	24	
4	UNAM	17	5	4	8	24	29	−5	19	
5	Celaya	17	3	4	10	21	27	−6	13	

Source: MedioTiempo

Group 3
Pos	Team	Pld	W	D	L	GF	GA	GD	Pts	Qualification
1	Necaxa	17	8	4	5	29	22	+7	28	Directly qualified to the Liguilla (Playoffs)
2	Santos Laguna	17	7	5	5	32	29	+3	26	Directly qualified to the Liguilla (Playoffs)
3	Monterrey	17	5	5	7	23	30	−7	20	
4	Puebla	17	4	4	9	18	29	−11	16	

Source: MedioTiempo

Group 4
Pos	Team	Pld	W	D	L	GF	GA	GD	Pts	Qualification
1	Pachuca	17	8	4	5	24	18	+6	28	Directly qualified to the Liguilla (Playoffs)
2	América	17	7	5	5	26	23	+3	26	Directly qualified to the Liguilla (Playoffs)
3	UAG	17	7	4	6	33	36	−3	25	
4	Guadalajara	17	3	5	9	18	27	−9	14	

Source: MedioTiempo

== League table ==
Pos	Team	Pld	W	D	L	GF	GA	GD	Pts	Qualification
1	Cruz Azul	17	10	3	4	34	21	+13	33	Directly qualified to the Liguilla (Playoffs)
2	Toluca	17	9	3	5	32	26	+6	30	Directly qualified to the Liguilla (Playoffs)
3	Necaxa	17	8	4	5	29	22	+7	28	Directly qualified to the Liguilla (Playoffs)
4	Pachuca	17	8	4	5	24	18	+6	28	Directly qualified to the Liguilla (Playoffs)
5	Morelia	17	7	6	4	29	24	+5	27	Qualified for the Repechage
6	Santos Laguna	17	7	5	5	32	29	+3	26	Directly qualified to the Liguilla (Playoffs)
7	América	17	7	5	5	26	23	+3	26	Directly qualified to the Liguilla (Playoffs)
8	Atlas	17	6	7	4	35	29	+6	25	Directly qualified to the Liguilla (Playoffs)
9	Irapuato	17	6	7	4	28	26	+2	25	Qualified for the Repechage
10	UAG	17	7	4	6	33	36	−3	25	
11	UANL	17	6	6	5	23	23	0	24	
12	Monterrey	17	5	5	7	23	30	−7	20	
13	UNAM	17	5	4	8	24	29	−5	19	
14	León	17	4	6	7	27	33	−6	18	
15	Atlante	17	3	8	6	24	28	−4	17	
16	Puebla	17	4	4	9	18	29	−11	16	
17	Guadalajara	17	3	5	9	18	27	−9	14	
18	Celaya	17	3	4	10	21	27	−6	13	

Source: MedioTiempo

== Results ==
Home \ Away	AME	ATE	ATS	CEL	CAZ	GDL	IRA	LEO	MTY	MOR	NEC	PAC	PUE	SAN	TOL	UAG	UNL	UNM
América	—	–	–	–	–	0–3	–	5–1	1–2	4–3	–	–	0–0	–	0–2	1–1	–	2–1
Atlante	1–4	—	1–1	–	1–1	–	0–1	–	–	–	1–4	1–0	–	2–2	–	1–1	–	5–1
Atlas	1–1	–	—	–	3–2	2–0	–	4–1	–	–	–	1–1	3–3	–	–	–	1–1	3–1
Celaya	0–1	1–1	2–0	—	0–1	–	1–1	–	–	–	2–1	0–0	–	2–3	–	–	–	2–2
Cruz Azul	1–0	–	–	–	—	2–1	–	–	3–0	3–1	–	1–1	–	–	3–2		–	3–1
Guadalajara	–	1–3	–	1–3	–	—	0–0	1–3	–	–	0–1	–	1–0	3–3	–	–	0–1	–
Irapuato	1–1	–	2–2	–	2–1	–	—	–	2–0	0–0	–	2–0	–	–	3–2	4–5	–	1–4
León	–	1–1	–	2–1	1–0	–	0–1	—	–	–	2–2	–	4–1	1–1	–	–	2–2	–
Monterrey	–	3–3	2–5	3–1	–	2–1	–	1–1	—	–	1–2	–	3–1	3–3	–	–	1–0	–
Morelia	–	1–1	3–1	1–0	–	1–1	–	2–2	3–0	—	–	–	1–0	–	1–0	–	2–1	–
Necaxa	1–2	–	2–3	–	2–2	–	1–1	–	–	1–1	—	1–2	–	–	0–1	3–1	–	3–2
Pachuca	0–1	–	–	–	–	2–0	–	2–1	2–1	3–1	–	—	–	–	3–4	3–1	–	1–0
Puebla	–	3–1	–	2–1	2–4	–	2–1	–	–	–	0–1	0–2	—	2–1	–	–	0–0	–
Santos Laguna	2–0	–	2–1	–	2–3	–	3–2	–	–	3–1	1–2	2–1	–	—	–	3–1	–	0–3
Toluca	–	1–0	4–3	3–2	–	2–2	–	4–3	0–0	–	–	–	3–0	0–0	—	–	1–2	–
UAG	–	–	1–1	3–2	–	2–3	–	3–1	2–1	0–3	–	–	2–2	–	3–1	—	3–2	–
UANL	3–3	2–1	–	2–1	1–0	–	1–1	–	–	–	0–2	1–1	–	2–1	–	–	—	–
UNAM	–	–	–	–	–	0–0	–	2–1	0–0	1–1	–	–	1–0	–	1–2	1–3	3–2	—

Updated to match(es) played on 19 November 2000. Source: RSSSF
Legend: Blue = home team win; Yellow = draw; Red = away team win.

== Top goalscorers ==
Players sorted first by goals scored, then by last name. Only regular season goals listed.

Rank	Player	Club	Goals
1	(Mexico) Jared Borgetti	Santos Laguna	18
2	(Argentina) Ángel Morales	Cruz Azul	12
3	(Mexico) Antonio de Nigris	Monterrey	11
3	(Mexico) Daniel Osorno	Atlas	11
5	(Honduras) Carlos Pavón	Morelia	10
5	(Uruguay) Martín Rodríguez	Irapuato	10
7	(Mexico) Armando González	Celaya	9
7	(Paraguay) Julio César Yegros	UNAM	9
9	(Brazil) Adelino Batista	León	8
9	(Argentina) Alejandro Glaría	Puebla	8
9	(Uruguay) Carlos María Morales	Toluca	8
9	(Argentina) Cristián Morales	Irapuato	8
9	(Mexico) Francisco Palencia	Cruz Azul	8
9	(Costa Rica) Jafet Soto	UAG	8

Source: MedioTiempo

== Final phase (Liguilla) ==
=== Repechage ===
November 23, 2000
20:30

Irapuato	1–0	Morelia
Gómez 55'	Report

Estadio Sergio León Chávez, Irapuato
Referee: Gilberto Alcalá Pineda (Mexico City)
November 26, 2000
12:00

Morelia	7–2	Irapuato
Pavón 24', 32', 34'; Alex 29', 45'; C. Morales 69', 90' (pen.)	Report	Briseño 40'; Morales 52'

Estadio Morelos, Morelia
Referee: José de Jesús Robles

Morelia won 7–3 on aggregate.

=== Bracket ===
Quarterfinals
2	Toluca (s)	2	2	4
7	América	0	4	4
1	Cruz Azul	1	0	1
8	Atlas	0	2	2
4	Pachuca	0	1	1
5	Morelia	0	2	2
3	Necaxa	1	2	3
6	Santos Laguna	2	2	4

Semifinals
2	Toluca	3	3	6
8	Atlas	3	1	4
5	Morelia	0	3	3
6	Santos Laguna	0	2	2

Finals
2	Toluca	1	2	3 (4)
5	Morelia (p)	3	0	3 (5)

=== Quarterfinals ===
November 29, 2000
20:00

América	0–2	Toluca
	Report	Morales 36'; Cardozo 87'

Estadio Azteca, Mexico City
Referee: Edgar Ulises Rangel (Estado de México)
December 2, 2000
15:00

Toluca	2–4	América
Silva 7' (o.g.); Cardozo 90'	Report	Oviedo 18'; Hernández 37'; Calderón 52'; Mendoza 89'

Estadio Nemesio Díez, Toluca
Referee: Antonio Marrufo (Chihuahua)

4–4 on aggregate. Toluca advanced for being the higher seeded team.

November 29, 2000
20:45

Atlas	0–1	Cruz Azul
	Report	Morales 69'

Estadio Jalisco, Guadalajara
Referee: Gilberto Alcalá Pineda (Mexico City)
December 2, 2000
17:00

Cruz Azul	0–2	Atlas
	Report	Castillo 4'; Zepeda 54' (pen.)

Estadio Azul, Mexico City
Referee: José de Jesús Robles

Atlas won 2–1 on aggregate.

November 30, 2000
14:00

Morelia	0–0	Pachuca
	Report

Estadio Morelos, Morelia
Referee: Armando Archundia (Estado de México)
December 3, 2000
12:00

Pachuca	1–2	Morelia
Pineda 56'	Report	Pavón 2'; H. Morales 67'

Estadio Hidalgo, Pachuca
Referee: Eduardo Brizio Carter (Mexico City)

Morelia won 2–1 on aggregate.

November 29, 2000
16:00

Santos Laguna	2–1	Necaxa
Gomes 20'; Róbson 76'	Report	Delgado 63'

Estadio Corona, Torreón
Referee: Jorge Eduardo Gasso (Mexico City)
December 2, 2000
20:00

Necaxa	2–2	Santos Laguna
Zague 69', 90+3'	Report	Borgetti 27'; Róbson 36'

Estadio Azteca, Mexico City
Referee: Felipe Ramos Rizo (Mexico City)

Santos Laguna won 4–3 on aggregate.

=== Semifinals ===
December 6, 2000
20:45

Atlas	3–3	Toluca
Zepeda 39'; Briceño 81'; Esqueda 89'	Report	Espinosa 47'; Cardozo 60'; Sinha 87'

Estadio Jalisco, Guadalajara
Referee: Armando Archundia (Estado de México)
December 9, 2000
15:00

Toluca	3–1	Atlas
Cardozo 21', 24', 66'	Report	Méndez 7'

Estadio Nemesio Díez, Toluca
Referee: Felipe Ramos Rizo (Mexico City)

Toluca won 6–4 on aggregate.

December 7, 2000
15:30

Santos Laguna	0–0	Morelia
	Report

Estadio Corona, Torreón
Referee: Gilberto Alcalá Pineda (Mexico City)
December 10, 2000
12:00

Morelia	3–2	Santos Laguna
Lozano 8'; Almirón 48'; C. Morales 57'	Report	Rodríguez 65', 72'

Estadio Morelos, Morelia
Referee: Eduardo Brizio Carter (Mexico City)

Morelia won 3–2 on aggregate.

=== Finals ===
December 13, 2000
15:00

Morelia	3–1	Toluca
Ruiz 23'; Alex 38'; Trujillo 56'	Report	Cardozo 69'

Estadio Morelos, Morelia
Referee: Armando Archundia (Estado de México)

First leg

Morelia:
GK	1	(Argentina) Ángel Comizzo
DF	4	(Mexico) Hugo Chávez
DF	58	(Argentina) Darío Franco (c)	(yellow card) 45'
DF	5	(Mexico) Heriberto Morales
DF	27	(Mexico) Omar Trujillo
MF	8	(Argentina) Jorge Almirón	(yellow card) 28'
MF	17	(Mexico) José Antonio Noriega
MF	7	(Mexico) Flavio Davino	(yellow card) 44'
MF	22	(Mexico) Javier Lozano
MF	15	(Mexico) Mario Ruiz
FW	9	(Brazil) Alex Fernandes	(yellow card) 65'
Substitutions:
GK	12	(Mexico) Sergio Cisneros
DF	2	(Mexico) Jaime Alarcón
DF	3	(Mexico) Salvador Mariscal
DF	13	(Mexico) Miguel Hernández
DF	16	(Mexico) Eduardo Rodríguez
MF	28	(Mexico) Carlos Adrián Morales
FW	29	(Mexico) Antonio González
Manager:
(Mexico) Luis Fernando Tena

Toluca:
GK	1	(Argentina) Hernán Cristante
DF	4	(Mexico) Hassan Viades
DF	19	(Mexico) Adrian García Arias
DF	5	(Mexico) Omar Blanco
MF	8	(Mexico) Rafael García
MF	18	(Mexico) David Rangel (c)
MF	7	(Mexico) Víctor Ruiz	(yellow card) 87'
MF	13	(Mexico) Erik Espinosa		(substituted off) 69'
MF	11	(Brazil) Manoel Ferreira
MF	27	(Mexico) Enrique Alfaro		(substituted off) 77'
FW	9	(Paraguay) José Cardozo	(yellow card) 54'
Substitutions:
GK	30	(Mexico) Mario Albarrán
DF	21	(Mexico) Robert Charles Forbes
DF	58	(Mexico) Adán Nuñez
MF	6	(Mexico) Antonio Taboada
MF	10	(Brazil) Sinha
MF	14	(Mexico) Manuel Martínez		(substituted on) 61'
FW	15	(Uruguay) Carlos María Morales		(substituted on) 77'
Manager:
(Argentina) Ricardo Ferrero

Second leg

December 16, 2000
15:00

Toluca	2–0 (a.e.t.)	Morelia
Espinosa 15'; Cardozo 26'	Report
Penalties
Ruiz (penalty scored); Taboada (penalty scored); Sinha (penalty missed); Blanco (penalty scored); Cardozo (penalty missed); Martínez (penalty scored); García Arias (penalty missed)	4−5	(penalty scored) C. Morales; (penalty scored) Almirón; (penalty missed) Lozano; (penalty scored) Chávez; (penalty missed) Alex; (penalty scored) Hernández; (penalty scored) H. Morales

Estadio Nemesio Díez, Toluca
Referee: Felipe Ramos Rizo (Mexico City)

3–3 on aggregate. Morelia won 5–4 on penalty kicks.

Toluca:
GK	1	(Argentina) Hernán Cristante
DF	27	(Mexico) Enrique Alfaro
DF	19	(Mexico) Adrian García Arias
DF	5	(Mexico) Omar Blanco
DF	4	(Mexico) Hassan Viades
DF	18	(Mexico) David Rangel (c)	(yellow card) 13' (yellow-red card) 83'
MF	7	(Mexico) Víctor Ruiz
MF	11	(Brazil) Manoel Ferreira	(yellow card) 19'	(substituted off) 61'
MF	13	(Mexico) Erik Espinosa		(substituted off) 69'
FW	15	(Uruguay) Carlos María Morales		(substituted off) 85'
FW	9	(Paraguay) José Cardozo
Substitutions:
GK	30	(Mexico) Mario Albarrán
DF	58	(Mexico) Adán Nuñez
MF	6	(Mexico) Antonio Taboada		(substituted on) 85'
MF	8	(Mexico) Rafael García
MF	10	(Brazil) Sinha		(substituted on) 61'
MF	14	(Mexico) Manuel Martínez		(substituted on) 69'
FW	17	(Mexico) Eduardo Lillingston
Manager:
(Argentina) Ricardo Ferrero

Morelia:
GK	1	(Argentina) Ángel Comizzo	(yellow card) 105'
DF	4	(Mexico) Hugo Chávez	(yellow card) 46'
DF	58	(Argentina) Darío Franco (c)
DF	5	(Mexico) Heriberto Morales	(yellow card) 21'
DF	27	(Mexico) Omar Trujillo
MF	8	(Argentina) Jorge Almirón	(yellow card) 118'
MF	7	(Mexico) Flavio Davino		(substituted off) 103'
MF	17	(Mexico) José Antonio Noriega		(substituted off) 79'
MF	22	(Mexico) Javier Lozano
MF	15	(Mexico) Mario Ruiz
FW	9	(Brazil) Alex Fernandes	(yellow card) 6'
Substitutions:
GK	12	(Mexico) Sergio Cisneros
DF	2	(Mexico) Jaime Alarcón
DF	3	(Mexico) Salvador Mariscal
DF	13	(Mexico) Miguel Hernández		(substituted on) 103'
DF	16	(Mexico) Eduardo Rodríguez
MF	28	(Mexico) Carlos Adrián Morales		(substituted on) 79'
FW	29	(Mexico) Antonio González
Manager:
(Mexico) Luis Fernando Tena

Champions

1st title
