= Robert Siboldi =

Uruguayan footballer and manager (born 1965)

Personal information
- Full name: Robert Dante Siboldi Badiola
- Date of birth: September 24, 1965 (age 61)
- Place of birth: Colonia Nicolich, Montevideo, Uruguay
- Height: 1.90 m (6 ft 3 in)
- Position: Goalkeeper

Senior career*
Years	Team	Apps	(Gls)
1983–1988	Peñarol	0	(0)
1988–1989	Gimnasia (LP)	0	(0)
1989–1992	Atlas	108	(0)
1993–1994	Cruz Azul	32	(0)
1994–1995	Puebla	40	(0)
1995–2000	Tigres UANL	109	(0)
2000–2001	Argentinos Juniors	18	(0)
2001–2002	Atlético Junior	23	(0)
2002	Gavilanes de Nuevo Laredo	12	(0)

International career
1992–1997	Uruguay	34	(0)

Managerial career
- 2006–2007: Cruz Azul Jasso
- 2007–2009: Cruz Azul Hidalgo
- 2009: Cruz Azul (interim)
- 2012: Dorados de Sinaloa
- 2015: Santos Laguna (interim)
- 2017–2018: Santos Laguna
- 2018–2019: Veracruz
- 2019–2020: Cruz Azul
- 2021: Tijuana
- 2022: Al-Ahli
- 2023–2024: Tigres UANL
- 2025: Mazatlán
- * Club domestic league appearances and goals

Robert Dante Siboldi Badiola (born 24 September 1965) is a Uruguayan professional manager and former footballer.

A talented goalkeeper, Siboldi played most of his club career in Mexico and for the Uruguay national team between 1992-1997.

As a manager, Siboldi has been Liga MX champion twice, with Santos Laguna and Tigres UANL, respectively, in only three playoffs disputed. Both of his Liga MX championships were as interim coach.

== Playing career ==
=== Club career ===
Siboldi played professional club football in Uruguay, Argentina, Mexico, and Colombia.

In Mexico, he played for Atlas, Cruz Azul, Puebla, and UANL Tigres.

He arrived to Tigres in 1995, a season in which the team was relegated to Primera División A. Siboldi chose to stay, and was instrumental in returning the team to First Division within the year. He became an idol between the fans of the team. He played for Tigres until 1999.

=== International career ===
Siboldi made his international debut on June 21, 1992, in a friendly against Australia (2-0). He obtained a total number of 34 international caps for the Uruguay national football team.

== Managerial career ==
=== Early career ===
Siboldi began his coaching career as a goalkeeping coach with Zacatepec, later taking similar roles at Irapuato, León, and Cruz Azul. From 2006 to 2011, he held various positions within Cruz Azul, working with the youth teams, the second and third division reserves, and even serving briefly as interim manager of the first team. In December 2011, he took over Dorados de Sinaloa and managed the team during the Clausura 2012.

In July 2014, Siboldi became director of Santos Laguna's youth academy. In September 2017, he was appointed head coach. He guided Santos Laguna to the Clausura 2018 title, beating Deportivo Toluca 3–2 on aggregate in the final.

In December 2018, Siboldi became head coach of Veracruz. He resigned in April 2019, following a 9–2 defeat to Pachuca. In September 2019, Siboldi returned to Cruz Azul as head coach. During the Guardianes 2020 tournament, the team reached the semifinals but was eliminated by UNAM, who advanced on a higher table position after a 4–4 aggregate draw. He resigned in December 2020.

=== Tijuana ===
On 19 April 2021, Siboldi became the head coach of Club Tijuana replacing Pablo Guede. On 29 September, he was removed from his post.

=== Al-Ahli ===
On 5 March 2022, Siboldi became manager of Al-Ahli in the Saudi Pro League. He was relieved of his duties on 22 June, after the club was relegated for the first time in its history.

=== Tigres UANL ===
On 10 April 2023, Siboldi became the head coach of Tigres UANL. At the time, they were in contention for a playoff spot with only three games remaining. Tigres qualified for the Clausura 2023 play‑offs in seventh place, where they defeated Deportivo Toluca in the quarter‑finals and subsequently eliminated Monterrey to reach the final. There, they prevailed 3–2 against Guadalajara, securing the club's eight league championship and Siboldi's second.

On 4 June 2024, Siboldi was dismissed from his post after allegations surfaced that his assistant had leaked privileged information to rivals Monterrey.

=== Mazatlán ===
On 20 May 2025, Mazatlán announced Siboldi as their new head coach. On December 12, he resigned from his position following the announcement of the club's impending disappearance.

== Honours ==
=== Player ===
Peñarol

- Uruguayan Primera División: 1985, 1986
- Copa Libertadores: 1987

Tigres UANL

- Liga de Ascenso de México: Invierno 1996, Verano 1997
- Copa México: 1995–96

Individual

- Mexican Primera División Golden Glove: 1989–90

=== Manager ===
Cruz Azul Jasso

- Segunda División de México: Clausura 2007

Santos Laguna

- Liga MX: Clausura 2018

Cruz Azul

- Leagues Cup: 2019

Tigres UANL

- Liga MX: Clausura 2023
- Campeón de Campeones: 2023
- Campeones Cup: 2023

Individual

- Liga MX Manager of the Tournament: 2017–18
