= 1996–97 Primera División A season =

Season of a Mexican football league

Ascenso MX
- Season: 1996–97
- Champions: Apertura: Tigres UANL (1st Title); Clausura: Tigres UANL (2nd title)
- Promoted: Tigres UANL
- Relegated: Atletico San Francisco
- Top goalscorer: Invierno: Nilson Esidio Munoz (12); Carlos Pavón, Ángel Lemus (12)

Primera División A (Méxican First A Division) is a Mexican football tournament. This was the first short tournament played in any of the divisions in Mexico composed of Invieno 1996 and Verano 1997. Tigres UANL were able to gain direct promotion to Primera Division for the 1997-98 season after winning both short tournaments in 1996-97.

== Changes for the 1996–97 season ==
- Tigres UANL were demoted from Liga MX
- Tigrillos UANL were promoted from Segunda División.
- Pachuca were promoted to Liga MX
- Gallos Blancos de Hermosillo relocated to Pachuca and renamed Atlético Hidalgo.
- Real Sociedad de Zacatecas new team.

== Teams and stadiums ==
Location of teams in the 1996–97 Primera División A

Team	City	Stadium	Capacity
Acapulco	Acapulco de Juárez	Unidad Deportiva Acapulco	13,000
Atlético Hidalgo	Pachuca	Hidalgo	30.000
Cruz Azul Hidalgo	Jasso	10 de Diciembre	10.000
Correcaminos UAT	Ciudad Victoria	Estadio Marte R. Gómez	20.000
Irapuato	Irapuato	Sergio León Chávez	26.000
La Piedad	La Piedad	Juan N. López	20.000
San Luis	San Luis Potosí	Plan de San Luis	18.000
Real Sociedad de Zacatecas	Zacatecas	Francisco Villa	18.000
Atlético San Francisco	San Francisco del Rincón	San Francisco	8.000
Saltillo Soccer	Saltillo	Francisco I. Madero	10.000
Tampico Madero	Tampico-Ciudad Madero	Tamaulipas	30.000
Inter de Tijuana	Tijuana	Cerro Colorado	12.000
UANL	San Nicolás de los Garza	Universitario	40.000
Tigrillos	San Nicolás de los Garza	Universitario	40.000
Marte	Xochitepec	Mariano Matamoros	18.000
Atlético Yucatán	Mérida	Carlos Iturralde	24,000
Zacatepec	Zacatepec	Agustín Díaz	18.000

== Invierno 1996 ==
This year Atlético Hidalgo joined the league along with Tigres UANL who had been relegated. Tigres UANL would go on to be the tournament's champion.

=== Group league tables ===
==== Group 1 ====
Pos	Team	Pld	W	D	L	GF	GA	GD	Pts	Qualification
1	UANL	16	11	2	3	29	13	+16	35	Qualifies for the Liguilla
2	UAT	16	7	5	4	21	21	0	26	Qualifies for the Liguilla
3	RS Zacatecas	16	6	7	3	24	17	+7	25	Qualifies for the Liguilla
4	San Luis	16	7	3	6	26	31	−5	24	
5	Tigrillos	16	4	4	8	21	21	0	16	

Source: FMF
Rules for classification: 1st points; 2nd goal difference; 3rd goals scored; 4th head-to-head; 5th away goals scored; 6th draw

==== Group 2 ====
Pos	Team	Pld	W	D	L	GF	GA	GD	Pts	Qualification
1	Tampico Madero	16	7	4	5	16	18	−2	25	Qualifies for the Liguilla
2	La Piedad	16	5	5	6	20	22	−2	20	Qualifies for the Liguilla
3	Atlético Yucatán	16	5	5	6	13	16	−3	20	
4	Inter de Tijuana	16	4	3	9	16	26	−10	15	

Source: FMF
Rules for classification: 1st points; 2nd goal difference; 3rd goals scored; 4th head-to-head; 5th away goals scored; 6th draw

==== Group 3 ====
Pos	Team	Pld	W	D	L	GF	GA	GD	Pts	Qualification
1	Marte	16	7	5	4	24	17	+7	26	Qualifies for the Liguilla
2	Atlético Hidalgo	16	7	4	5	21	15	+6	25	Qualifies for the Liguilla
3	Acapulco	16	4	3	9	17	27	−10	15	
4	Atlético San Francisco	16	4	2	10	20	25	−5	14	Last on the relegation table

Source: FMF
Rules for classification: 1st points; 2nd goal difference; 3rd goals scored; 4th head-to-head; 5th away goals scored; 6th draw

==== Group 4 ====
Pos	Team	Pld	W	D	L	GF	GA	GD	Pts	Qualification
1	Irapuato	16	8	3	5	16	13	+3	27	Qualifies for the Liguilla
2	Saltillo	16	6	6	4	20	15	+5	24	Qualifies for the Liguilla
3	Cruz Azul Hidalgo	16	5	4	7	21	20	+1	19	
4	Zacatepec	16	4	5	7	14	22	−8	17	

Source: FMF
Rules for classification: 1st points; 2nd goal difference; 3rd goals scored; 4th head-to-head; 5th away goals scored; 6th draw

=== General league table ===
Pos	Team	Pld	W	D	L	GF	GA	GD	Pts	Qualification
1	UANL	16	11	2	3	29	13	+16	35	Qualifies for the Liguilla
2	Irapuato	16	8	3	5	16	13	+3	27	Qualifies for the Liguilla
3	Marte	16	7	5	4	24	17	+7	26	Qualifies for the Liguilla
4	UAT	16	7	5	4	21	21	0	26	Qualifies for the Liguilla
5	RS Zacatecas	16	6	7	3	24	17	+7	25	Qualifies for the Liguilla
6	Atlético Hidalgo	16	7	4	5	21	15	+6	25	Qualifies for the Liguilla
7	Tampico Madero	16	7	4	5	16	18	−2	25	Qualifies for the Liguilla
8	Saltillo	16	6	6	4	20	15	+5	24	Qualifies for the Liguilla
9	San Luis	16	7	3	6	26	31	−5	24	
10	La Piedad	16	5	5	6	20	22	−2	20	Qualifies for the Liguilla
11	Atlético Yucatán	16	5	5	6	13	16	−3	20	
12	Cruz Azul Hidalgo	16	5	4	7	21	20	+1	19	
13	Zacatepec	16	4	5	7	14	22	−8	17	
14	Tigrillos	16	4	4	8	21	21	0	16	
15	Acapulco	16	4	3	9	17	27	−10	15	
16	Inter de Tijuana	16	4	3	9	16	26	−10	15	
17	Atlético San Francisco	16	4	2	10	20	25	−5	14	Last on the relegation table

Source: FMF
Rules for classification: 1st points; 2nd goal difference; 3rd goals scored; 4th head-to-head; 5th away goals scored; 6th draw

=== Results ===
Home \ Away	ACA	ATH	CRH	IRA	LAP	MAR	SNL	RSZ	SAL	SFR	TAM	TJS	UNL	TIG	UAT	YUC	ZAC
Acapulco		1–1	2–2					1–4	1–1	3–2			1–2	1–0			2–0
Atlético Hidalgo			4–1				4–1	0–1	1–1	1–0			0–0	2–0	1–2		4–1
Cruz Azul Hidalgo				3–1	3–0	0–1	4–2				2–1		1–2			2–0	
Irapuato	1–0	0–1						2–0	1–0	2–1		1–0		2–1			0–1
La Piedad	4–0	0–1		1–0				1–1	1–1			3–2		1–1	4–1		
Marte	1–0	5–1		2–2	3–1						2–0	3–1			1–1	1–2	
San Luis	4–2			0–0	2–1	1–0					2–2	1–0				4–1	
RS Zacatecas			2–1			1–1	1–1			3–0	1–3		1–1		0–0	1–1	3–0
Saltillo			1–0			0–0	5–0	3–2		1–0			0–1	2–1	1–1		1–2
San Francisco			1–0		1–1	3–0	4–6				4–1		1–2			0–2	0–0
Tampico Madero	1–0	1–0		1–2	1–0				0–0			2–2			1–0	1–0	
Tijuana	1–0	1–0	0–0					1–2	2–3	2–1				1–1			1–0
Tigres				1–0	4–0	2–3	1–0				2–0	5–1				2–0	
Tigrillos			1–1			1–0	4–1	1–1		1–2	1–1		1–2		5–1		2–1
UAT	3–2		2–1	1–1			2–0			1–0		2–0	1–0				3–4
Yucatán	0–1	0–0		0–1	1–1				2–0			2–1		1–0	0–0		
Zacatepec			0–0		0–1	1–1	0–1				0–0		3–2			1–1	

Updated to match(es) played on 24 November 1997. Source: Memoria Futbolera (subscription required)
Legend: Blue = home team win; Yellow = draw; Red = away team win.

=== Liguilla ===
==== Repechaje ====
Home	Team	Score	Visitor	Global
1	C.F. La Piedad	2-1	Real Sociedad	
2	Real Sociedad	6-1	C.F. La Piedad	7-3

Quarterfinals
1	Tigres	1	1	2
8	Saltillo	1	1	2
5	Tampico Madero	3	1	5
4	Irapuato FC	0	0	2
3	Atlético Hidalgo	0	1	3
6	Marte	0	0	1
7	Real Sociedad	2	0	1
2	Correcaminos	0	1	0

Semifinals
1	Tigres	2	8	10
4	Tampico Madero	1	2	1
2	Atlético Hidalgo	2	3	1
2	Real Sociedad	0	1	7

Finals
1	Tigres	0	3	3
2	Atlético Hidalgo	1	0	1

Invierno 1996 winner:

1st title

=== Top scorers ===
Scorer	Goals	Team
(Brazil) Nilson Esidio Munoz	12	Tigres
(Mexico) Ángel Lemus	10	Irapuato
(Argentina) Juan Zandoná	9	Real Sociedad de Zacatecas

Last updated: May 3, 2008
Source: FMF Last updated: January 20, 2012
Source: Senorgol

== Verano 1997 ==
Tigres UANL would go on to be the tournament's champion.

=== Group league tables ===
==== Group 1 ====
Pos	Team	Pld	W	D	L	GF	GA	GD	Pts	Qualification
1	UAT	16	10	4	2	28	16	+12	34	Qualifies for the Liguilla
2	UANL	16	9	6	1	42	20	+22	33	Qualifies for the Liguilla
3	Tigrillos	16	7	5	4	21	16	+5	26	Qualifies for the Liguilla
4	RS Zacatecas	16	4	5	7	27	25	+2	17	
5	San Luis	16	3	8	5	25	32	−7	17	

Source: FMF
Rules for classification: 1st points; 2nd goal difference; 3rd goals scored; 4th head-to-head; 5th away goals scored; 6th draw

==== Group 2 ====
Pos	Team	Pld	W	D	L	GF	GA	GD	Pts	Qualification
1	Atlético Yucatán	16	6	4	6	19	21	−2	22	Qualifies for the Liguilla
2	Tampico Madero	16	6	2	8	24	29	−5	20	Qualifies for the Liguilla
3	La Piedad	16	3	6	7	26	34	−8	15	
4	Inter de Tijuana	16	2	4	10	13	32	−19	10	Last on the relegation table

Source: FMF
Rules for classification: 1st points; 2nd goal difference; 3rd goals scored; 4th head-to-head; 5th away goals scored; 6th draw

==== Group 3 ====
Pos	Team	Pld	W	D	L	GF	GA	GD	Pts	Qualification
1	Atlético Hidalgo	16	9	4	3	33	27	+6	31	Qualifies for the Liguilla
2	Atlético San Francisco	16	4	5	7	26	30	−4	17	Qualifies for the Liguilla
3	Acapulco	16	3	6	7	17	33	−16	15	
4	Marte	16	2	6	8	23	28	−5	12	

Source: FMF
Rules for classification: 1st points; 2nd goal difference; 3rd goals scored; 4th head-to-head; 5th away goals scored; 6th draw

==== Group 4 ====
Pos	Team	Pld	W	D	L	GF	GA	GD	Pts	Qualification
1	Cruz Azul Hidalgo	16	8	3	5	29	20	+9	27	Qualifies for the Liguilla
2	Saltillo	16	7	5	4	24	19	+5	26	Qualifies for the Liguilla
3	Zacatepec	16	7	3	6	21	23	−2	24	Qualifies for the Liguilla
4	Irapuato	16	4	8	4	26	19	+7	20	

Source: FMF
Rules for classification: 1st points; 2nd goal difference; 3rd goals scored; 4th head-to-head; 5th away goals scored; 6th draw

=== General league table ===
Pos	Team	Pld	W	D	L	GF	GA	GD	Pts	Qualification
1	UAT	16	10	4	2	28	16	+12	34	Qualifies for the Liguilla
2	UANL	16	9	6	1	42	20	+22	33	Qualifies for the Liguilla
3	Atlético Hidalgo	16	9	4	3	33	27	+6	31	Qualifies for the Liguilla
4	Cruz Azul Hidalgo	16	8	3	5	29	20	+9	27	Qualifies for the Liguilla
5	Saltillo	16	7	5	4	24	19	+5	26	Qualifies for the Liguilla
6	Tigrillos	16	7	5	4	21	16	+5	26	Qualifies for the Liguilla
7	Zacatepec	16	7	3	6	21	23	−2	24	Qualifies for the Liguilla
8	Atlético Yucatán	16	6	4	6	19	21	−2	22	Qualifies for the Liguilla
9	Irapuato	16	4	8	4	26	19	+7	20	
10	Tampico Madero	16	6	2	8	24	29	−5	20	Qualifies for the Liguilla
11	RS Zacatecas	16	4	5	7	27	25	+2	17	
12	Atlético San Francisco	16	4	5	7	26	30	−4	17	Qualifies for the Liguilla
13	San Luis	16	3	8	5	25	32	−7	17	
14	La Piedad	16	3	6	7	26	34	−8	15	
15	Acapulco	16	3	6	7	17	33	−16	15	
16	Marte	16	2	6	8	23	28	−5	12	
17	Inter de Tijuana	16	2	4	10	13	32	−19	10	Last on the relegation table

Source: FMF
Rules for classification: 1st points; 2nd goal difference; 3rd goals scored; 4th head-to-head; 5th away goals scored; 6th draw

=== Results ===
Home \ Away	ACA	ATH	CRH	IRA	LAP	MAR	SNL	RSZ	SAL	SFR	TAM	TJS	UNL	TIG	UAT	YUC	ZAC
Acapulco				0–0	4–3	2–2	3–2				0–2	4–2			0–1	0–0	
Atlético Hidalgo	2–2			2–1	1–3	4–2					3–2	2–0				4–1	
Cruz Azul Hidalgo	6–0	2–3						1–1	0–2	2–1		3–0		2–1	2–1		3–1
Irapuato			2–0		6–0	2–2	4–2				3–1		1–1		0–0	2–3	
La Piedad			3–3			1–1	1–1			1–1	4–1		2–2			0–1	0–1
Marte			2–3				5–1	2–4	1–1	2–3			0–1	1–1			1–2
San Luis		5–1	1–0					2–2	2–2	0–0			2–4	2–1	1–1		1–1
RS Zacatecas	3–0	1–1		1–1	1–2				0–0			3–1		0–2			
Saltillo	2–0	1–2		1–1	4–2						1–0	3–0				2–1	
San Francisco	3–1	2–3		1–1				3–2	1–1			4–0		0–1	2–3		
Tampico Madero			1–0			0–0	4–0	1–0		5–3			2–2	0–2			2–1
Tijuana				1–1	1–1	0–1	1–1				4–1		1–2		0–2	1–0	
Tigres	4–0	2–2	1–1					3–2	6–1	4–0				1–1	3–1		4–1
Tigrillos	1–1	0–1		2–1	2–1				2–1			1–1				2–1	
Correcaminos UAT		2–2			4–2	2–1		2–1	1–0		4–1			0–0		1–0	
Yucatán			0–1			1–0	2–2	3–2		1–1	2–1		3–2				0–0
Zacatepec	0–0	1–0		2–0				1–4	0–2	3–1		3–0		3–2	1–3		

Updated to match(es) played on 4 May 1998. Source: Memoria Futbolera (subscription required)
Legend: Blue = home team win; Yellow = draw; Red = away team win.

=== Liguilla ===
==== Repechaje ====
===== First leg =====
May 8, 1997
15:00

A.S Francisco	2–1	U.N.L.

Estadio Domingo Velázquez
San Francisco del Rincón, Guanajuato
Attendance: 8,000

===== Second leg =====
May 10, 1997
17:00

Tigrillos	4–1	A.S Francisco

Estadio Universitario

===== First leg =====
May 8, 1997
21:00

Tampico-Madero	1–1	Zacatepec

Estadio Tamaulipas

===== Second leg =====
May 11, 1997
15:00

Zacatepec	3–1	Tampico-Madero

Estadio Agustín Coruco Díaz

==== Liguilla ====
Quarterfinals
1	Tigres	2	3	5
8	Zacatepec	1	0	1
5	Cruz Azul Hidalgo	1	0	1
4	Saltillo	0	1	1
3	Atlético Hidalgo	1	3	4
6	Tigrillos	4	1	5
7	Correcaminos	1	2	3
2	A. Yucatán	1	1	2

Semifinals
1	Tigres	0	3	3
4	Cruz Azul Hidalgo	1	0	1
2	Correcaminos	0	6	6
6	Tigrillos	0	2	2

Finals
1	Tigres	0	4	4
2	Correcaminos	1	0	1

Verano 1997 winner:

2nd title

=== Top scorers ===
Scorer	Goals	Team
(Honduras) Carlos Pavón	12	Correcaminos
(Mexico) Ángel Lemus	12	Irapuato

Last updated: May 3, 2008
Source: FMF Last updated: January 20, 2012
Source: Senorgol

== Campeón de Ascenso 1997 ==
UANL were champions of Invierno 1996 and Verano 1997 tournaments, automatically winning the Campeón de Ascenso and gained the promotion to Primera División.

== Relegation table ==
Pos.	Team	Games	Points	PPG
14.	Acapulco	90	79	0.8778
15.	Atlético Yucatán	60	52	0.8667
16.	Marte	90	78	0.8667
17.	Tijuana	90	78	0.8667
