= Carlos Reyes (Chilean footballer) =

Chilean footballer (born 1973)

Personal information
- Full name: Carlos Roberto Reyes Berríos
- Date of birth: 21 August 1973 (age 53)
- Place of birth: Santiago, Chile
- Height: 1.81 m (5 ft 11 in)
- Position: Forward

Youth career
- Audax Italiano

Senior career*
Years	Team	Apps	(Gls)
1994–1995	Magallanes	–	(–)
1996–1999	Audax Italiano	89	(21)
2000–2001	Colo-Colo	36	(8)
2002	Nacional Tijuana		
2003	Real Zacatecas		
2004–2005	Audax Italiano	68	(17)
2006	Magallanes	17	(5)

International career
1999	Chile	1	(0)
- * Club domestic league appearances and goals

Carlos Roberto Reyes Berríos (born 21 August 1973, in Santiago, Chile) is a former Chilean footballer who played for clubs in Chile and Mexico.

== Club career ==
A product of the Audax Italiano youth system, Reyes began his career playing for Magallanes in the Chilean third level, winning the league title in 1995. In 1996, he turned professional with Audax Italiano, where he would play eight seasons as a striker.

Reyes moved to Mexico where he played for Real Zacatecas and Nacional de Tijuana.

== International career ==
Reyes made an appearance for the Chile national team in a friendly against Bolivia on 28 April 1999, by replacing Manuel Neira at minute 18.

== Honours ==
Magallanes

- Tercera División de Chile (1): 1995
