= Hugo Chávez (disambiguation) =

Hugo Chávez (1954–2013) was the President of Venezuela from 1999 until his death in 2013.

Hugo Chávez may refer to:

- Hugo de los Reyes Chávez (1933−2024), Venezuelan state politician, father of the President
- Hugo Chávez (footballer) (born 1976), retired Mexican football defender
