= Eduardo Acevedo (footballer, born 1959) =

Uruguayan footballer (born 1959)

Personal information
- Full name: Eduardo Mario Acevedo Cardozo
- Date of birth: 25 September 1959 (age 67)
- Place of birth: Montevideo, Uruguay
- Height: 1.78 m (5 ft 10 in)
- Position: Defender

Senior career*
Years	Team	Apps	(Gls)
1979–1986	Defensor Sporting		
1986–1987	Deportivo La Coruña	5	(0)
1987–1991	Tecos UAG	80	(1)
1992	Toshiba		
1993	Fénix		
1994	Rentistas		
1995	Sud América		

International career
1983–1986	Uruguay	41	(1)

Managerial career
- 1996: Sud América
- 1998: Defensor Sporting
- 1999–2001: Deportivo Maldonado
- 2002: Gavilanes
- 2003–2004: Tecos
- 2004–2005: Morelia
- 2005–2006: Tecos
- 2009: Cerro
- 2009–2010: Nacional
- 2010: Estudiantes Tecos
- 2010–2011: Danubio
- 2012: Banfield
- 2015: Cerro
- 2016–2018: Defensor Sporting
- 2020: Universidad de Concepción
- 2021: Defensor Sporting
Medal record
Representing Uruguay
Copa América
Winner	1983
CONMEBOL–UEFA Cup of Champions
Runner-up	1985 France
- * Club domestic league appearances and goals

Eduardo Mario Acevedo Cardozo (born 25 September 1959) is a Uruguayan former footballer who played as a defender and manager. He obtained a total number of 41 international caps for the Uruguay national football team and was a member of the team that competed at the 1986 FIFA World Cup.

== Career ==
Acevedo played club football for Defensor Sporting Club in Uruguay. After the 1986 World Cup, he played for Deportivo de La Coruña in Spain, Tecos UAG in Mexico, and Toshiba in Japan.

Acevedo returned to Uruguay in 1993 to play for C.A. Fenix; he then had short spells with C.A. Rentistas and Sud América.
