= Níver Arboleda =

Colombian footballer (1967–2011)

Personal information
- Full name: Níver Arboleda Díaz
- Date of birth: 8 December 1967
- Place of birth: Puerto Tejada, Cauca, Colombia
- Date of death: 5 October 2011 (aged 43)
- Place of death: Guatemala City, Guatemala
- Position: Forward

Senior career*
Years	Team	Apps	(Gls)
1988–1991	Atlético Nacional	102	(22)
1992–1995	Deportivo Cali	147	(61)
1995–1996	Veracruz	29	(5)
1996–2000	Zacatepec		
2000–2001	RSD Zacatecas		
2001	Zhejiang Greentown		
2002–2003	Juventud Retalteca		
2003	Antigua GFC		

International career
1991–1995	Colombia	5	(0)
- * Club domestic league appearances and goals

Niver Arboleda Díaz (8 December 1967 – 5 October 2011) was a Colombian professional footballer who played as a forward for Atlético Nacional, Deportivo Cali, Veracruz, Zacatepec and Zhejiang Greentown.

== Club career ==
Born in Puerto Tejada, Cauca, Arboleda began playing football at the Carlos Sarmiento Lora School. He turned professional with Atlético Nacional, where he would win the 1989 Copa Libertadores. Next, he made 147 league appearances for Deportivo Cali before moving abroad to play for Tiburones Rojos de Veracruz in the Mexican Primera División. After one season in Veracruz, he played for second division sides Zacatepec and Real Sociedad de Zacatecas. He finished his career playing in Guatemala with Antigua GFC and Juventud Retalteca.

== International career ==
Arboleda also won four caps for the Colombia national team with two of them coming in the 1995 Copa America.

== Personal ==
Arboleda died from a heart attack during a surgical procedure at a Guatemala City hospital at age 43.
