= Lagartos de Tabasco =

Mexican football club

- Full name: Lagartos de Tabasco
- Nickname: Lagartos
- Founded: 2002; 24 years ago
- Dissolved: 2006; 20 years ago
- Ground: Estadio Olímpico de Villahermosa; Villahermosa, Tabasco
- Capacity: 10,500
Home colours	Away colours

Lagartos de Tabasco was a Mexican football team. The club was founded in 2002 in Villahermosa, Tabasco and it played a few tournaments in the Primera División 'A' de México until 2006, when the club left the league and was relocated to Coatzacoalcos, Veracruz due to financial problems.

== History ==
The club's first match in the Primera División 'A' de México was against Nacional Tijuana on January 12, 2003, the game was a 0–0 draw. The club was relegated to Group B along with clubs Zacatepec, Tapatío, and Jaguares de Tapachula. The club finished third in their division during their first tournament so qualified to the playoffs but fail to reach the final losing 5–2 to the eventual tournament champions León.

In 2006, the club played its last tournament match against Puebla on April 22, 2006, beating them 2–0. The club finished last in the Ascenso with a record of 8 wins, 2 draws and 9 losses; scoring 22 goals and allowing 23. The club was moved to Coatzacoalcos, Veracruz and became a reserve team for Tiburones Rojos de Coatzacoalcos.

== Notable players ==
- Álvaro González – most goals scored 48 2004–06
