= Hugo Chávez (footballer) =

Mexican footballer (born 1976)

Personal information
- Full name: Hugo Guillermo Chávez Fernández
- Date of birth: 16 October 1976 (age 50)
- Place of birth: Veracruz, Veracruz, México
- Height: 1.77 m (5 ft 10 in)
- Position: Defender

Senior career*
Years	Team	Apps	(Gls)
1993–1997	Veracruz	44	(3)
1997–2002	Morelia	106	(2)
2002–2003	Tigres UANL	20	(5)
2003–2006	Puebla	44	(0)
2007	Tecos UAG 1a. 'A'	2	(0)
2008–2009	Morelia	0	(0)
2009	Mérida FC	1	(0)
Total		217	(10)

International career
2001	Mexico	2	(0)

Managerial career
- 2011–2015: Morelia Youth Academy
- 2018: Club Atlético Valladolid
- 2018: Tiburones Rojos de Veracruz (interim)
- 2018–2019: Veracruz Youth Academy
- * Club domestic league appearances and goals

Hugo Guillermo Chávez Fernández (born 16 October 1976) is a Mexican former football defender. He won two caps for the Mexico national team in 2001 and was a member of the Mexican squad at the 2001 FIFA Confederations Cup.

== Career ==
Born in Veracruz, Chávez began playing football with Tiburones Rojos de Veracruz in 1993. He also played for Monarcas Morelia, UANL Tigres and Puebla F.C.

== Honours ==
Morelia

- Mexican Primera División: Invierno 2000
