= Ricardo Ferrero =

Argentine footballer

Personal information
- Full name: Ricardo José Ferrero
- Date of birth: 5 April 1955
- Date of death: 16 November 2015 (aged 60)
- Position: Goalkeeper

Senior career*
Years	Team	Apps	(Gls)
- Cruz Azul
- Barcelona
- Racing de Santander

Managerial career
- 2000: Deportivo Toluca
- * Club domestic league appearances and goals

Ricardo José Ferrero (5 April 1955 – 16 November 2015) was an Argentine professional footballer who played as a goalkeeper for Cruz Azul, Barcelona, and Racing de Santander. He later became a manager with Deportivo Toluca.
