= Cristián Morales =

Argentine footballer

Cristian Morales
Personal information
- Full name: Cristian Ariel Morales Yáñez
- Date of birth: 24 September 1972 (age 54)
- Place of birth: Rosari, Argentina
- Height: 1.75 m (5 ft 9 in)
- Position: Forward

Senior career*
Years	Team	Apps	(Gls)
1993–1994	Rosario Central	3	(0)
1994–1996	Argentino de Rosario		
1996–1997	Talleres RdE	23	(3)
1997–2001	Irapuato	219	(101)
2002	Veracruz	7	(3)
2002	Oaxaca	23	(17)
2003	Cobreloa	3	(1)
2003–2004	Tlaxcala	18	(10)
2004–2005	Pioneros	22	(10)
2005	Atlético Tucumán		
- * Club domestic league appearances and goals

Cristián Ariel Morales Yáñez (born 25 September 1972) is a former Argentine footballer who played for clubs of Argentina, Chile and Mexico.

== Career ==
Cristián Ariel Morales was born in Rosari, Argentina. He is considered to be one of the best Players from Irapuato FC, he won two championships with the team and won the promotion to the first division of Mexico. he is compared to Irapuato's current captain and Argentinian striker Ariel González.

In Chile, Morales played for Cobreloa in 2003.

== Honors ==
Irapuato (2)

- Primera Division A – Invierno 99, Verano 2000

Cobreloa

- Primera División – Apertura 2003

Individual

- Top goalscorer of the tournament: (2)
- Primera Division A – Invierno 98, Invierno 99
