= Adelino Batista =

Brazilian footballer (born 1973)

Personal information
- Full name: Adelino Batista da Silva Neto
- Date of birth: January 27, 1973 (age 53)
- Place of birth: Campina Grande, Brazil
- Height: 1.87 m (6 ft 2 in)

Senior career*
Years	Team	Apps	(Gls)
2000	Sampaio Corrêa		
2000–2001	León	33	(11)
- Vitória S.C.
2003	Correcaminos UAT	14	(8)
2003	?		
2004	Campinense		
- Treze
- Bahia
- Treze
2007	ABC		
2007	AS Arapiraquense	3	(?)
- Confiança
- * Club domestic league appearances and goals

Adelino Batista da Silva Neto (born 27 January 1973), known as Adelino Batista, is a Brazilian professional footballer.

== Career ==
Adelino Batista played for Sampaio Corrêa in 2000 Campeonato Maranhense.

He played for León in 2000-01 season, and Correcaminos UAT in Primera División A Verano 2003.

He then signed for Treze in January 2005. He is the runner-up goalscorer of Campeonato Paraibano 2005. He also played in Brasileiro Série C and scored.

After just scored once for Bahia in Campeonato Baiano, he re-signed Treze in August 2006 for their Série C campaign.

He then joined ABC in 2007, for their Campeonato Potiguar.

he signed a two-month contract with Arapiraquense in June 2007, for their Série C 2007.

In December 2007, he signed a contract until the end of Campeonato Sergipano for Confiança.
