= Estadio Olímpico de Villahermosa =

Multi-use stadium in Villahermosa, Mexico

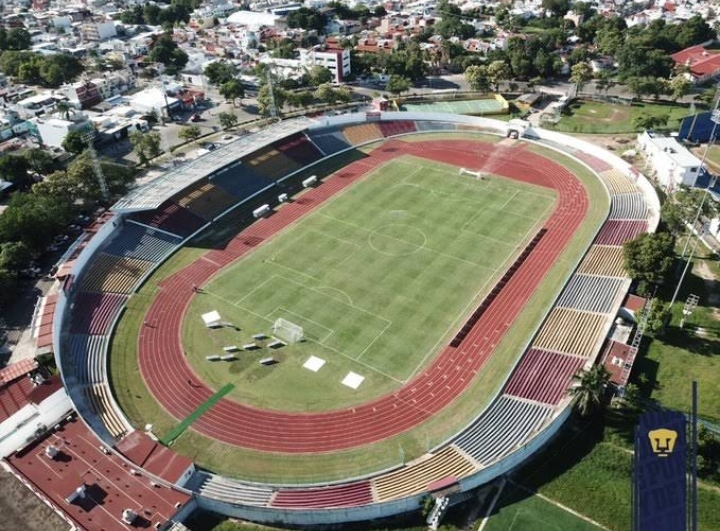
- Interactive map of Estadio Olímpico de Villahermosa
- Location: Villahermosa, Tabasco, Mexico
- Coordinates: 17°58′34″N 92°56′44″W
- Owner: Government of Tabasco
- Capacity: 12,000
- Surface: Grass

Construction
- Opened: 6 October 1964
- Renovated: 2020

Tenants
- Caimanes de Tabasco (1993–1996); Lagartos de Tabasco (2002–2006); Isleños del Carmen (2017–2018); Cocodrilos de Tabasco (2018–2019); Pumas Tabasco (2020–2023); Napoli Tabasco (2023–present)

The Estadio Olímpico de Villahermosa is a multi-use stadium located in Villahermosa, Tabasco, Mexico. It is currently used mostly for football matches and is the home stadium for Napoli Tabasco. The stadium has a capacity of 12,000 people.
