= Gavilanes de Nuevo Laredo =

- Full name: Asociación Nuevo Laredo
- Nickname: Gavilanes
- Founded: 2002
- Dissolved: 2003
- Ground: Unidad Deportiva de Nuevo Laredo
- Capacity: 6,500
- Chairman: Roberto de la Garza Poinsot
- Manager: Eduardo Acevedo
- League: Segunda División de México

The Club Gavilanes de Nuevo Laredo was a team of football that only competed in the Invierno 2002 season in Primera Division 'A' and Verano 2002 at the Segunda Division de Mexico.

== History ==
The club comes after Roberto de la Garza then president of the Primera Division acquired the franchise Neza which at that time belonged to José Antonio Hernández was already annoyed by the club. The Gavilanes in an attempt to start playing Guadalupe but did not receive consent from Monterrey and Tigres UANL so they established their headquarters in Nuevo Laredo. The team was made up of several veteran players like Robert Dante Siboldi, José Carlos Cancela Uruguay Nelson Laluz, Marco Antonio de Almeida, Mario "Cowboy" Jauregui, Francisco Javier Sánchez; plus another group of youth from Tigres B and Cobras subsidiaries of Monterrey and Tigres.

Gavilanes Laredo debuted at the Invierno 2002 tournament playing in Yucatán tying 0–0; soon evidenced lack of team and group level, tied their second game 1–1 Cihuatlan and then won their only game to Cruz Azul Hidalgo at week 3, 5–0; after this they lost 4–1 against Zacatepec and did not win again. They tied 4 times and accumulated 11 losses, getting 38 goals against and scoring 17 goals leaving them in last place with 9 points. After the completion of the season, the team lived uncertainty in late 2002 and even in January when the Verano 2004 tournament had begun in which they tried unsuccessfully to transfer to Tampico, but debts incurred before the Mexican Football Federation the branch disenrolled on January 27, 2003, then downgraded, after covering their debts, to Second Division where they competed to dissolved later on in the year.

== Stadium ==
The stadium is within a sport unit of the Municipality of Nuevo Laredo, called "Benito Juarez Garcia"; their field is a field with tartan track, and bleachers that can seat 6,500 spectators.
