= C.F. Cobras de Querétaro =

Mexican football club

Cobras de Querétaro
- Full name: Club de Fútbol Cobras de Querétaro
- Nicknames: Cobras, Ofidios
- Founded: 1982; 44 years ago
- League: Primera División de México
Home colours	Away colours

Club de Fútbol Cobras de Querétaro was a Mexican football club based in the city of Querétaro, Querétaro that participated in the Primera División de México.

== History ==
Cobras was founded on May 12, 1980, as Club de Fútbol Cobras de Querétaro, which was owned by television company Televisa. In 1985, the club acted as América's reserve team, while also pitching its veterans. Also in that year, it was first promoted to the Primera División de México after beating Pachuca with a score of 3–1. However, their stay would only be short-lived, as the team was immediately relegated, after collecting 31 points in 40 matches.

After Cobra's relegation, Alejandra de La Vega bought the club and moved it to Ciudad Juárez, Chihuahua, thus renaming it Club de Fútbol Cobras de Ciudad Juárez, meeting immediate success as it reached the Liga de Ascenso de México final that year and beat León 1–0, in a game played at the Estadio Azteca on July 12, 1988, with Joaquín Mendoza as its manager.

In 1994, after the readjustments made in the Primera División, Cobras folded, not being able to cope with serious economic problems. Seven years later, again as a feeder club – now to Monterrey – it was re-formed, playing and losing the 2003 promotion playoffs final, to Dorados de Sinaloa.

== Honors ==
- Liga de Ascenso de México: 2

1985–86, 1987–88
Runner-up (1): 2002–03

- Copa México: 1

1990–91
