= Guerreros Acapulco =

Mexican football club

- Full name: Guerreros de Acapulco
- Nickname: Guerreros (Warriors)
- Founded: 2009
- Dissolved: 2012
- Ground: Estadio Benito Juárez; Oaxaca City, Oaxaca, Mexico
- Capacity: 7,000
- Chairman: José del Carmen Vázquez Ávila
- Manager: (Mexico) Jorge Campos
- Coach: (Mexico) Mario "Pichojos" Pérez
- League: Segunda División de México
Home colours	Away colours

Guerreros de Acapulco was a Mexican football club that played in the Segunda División de México. The club was based in Acapulco, Guerrero.

== History ==
In 1987, the city of Acapulco, Guerrero purchased the Iguala F.C. franchise, allowing the club to play in the third-tier Segunda División 'B' de México for the 1987–88 season.

In 1990, they achieved promotion to Segunda División 'A' de México as the runners-up in the championship phase. They only lasted one year in the second tier before being relegated.

Guerreros de Acapulco were part of the founding members of a new division in Mexican football, the Primera División 'A' de México, and played in its inaugural 1994–95 season.

Guerreros de Acapulco was re-formed by Grupo Pegaso, which sold them the Pioneros de Cancún franchise that played in Cancún, Quintana Roo. Pioneros de Cancún was moved to Acapulco, Guerrero, and then once again to the city of Oaxaca, Oaxaca.

In Acapulco, they played at the Unidad Deportiva Acapulco. However, the team and the state government of Guerrero were unable to agree on the teams business. The state government of Oaxaca had agreed to help them move and would play at Estadio Benito Juárez playing with the same brand name starting in the Clausura 2012.

After one season, the Guerreros de Acapulco franchise was dissolved in 2012 and moved to the city of Oaxaca, Oaxaca.

== Coaches ==
Salvador Carmona 2009–2012
Mario "Pichojos" Perez 2012

== Stadium ==
- Estadio Unidad Deportiva Acapulco (2009—2012)
- Estadio Benito Juárez (2012)

== See also ==
- Football in Mexico
