= Ascenso MX =

Defunct association football league in Mexico

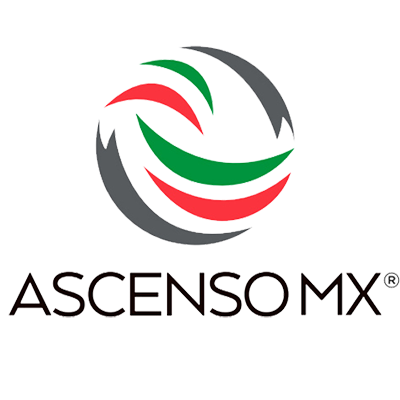
- Organising body: Mexican Football Federation
- Founded: 1994; 32 years ago as Primera División 'A' Profesional de México
- Folded: 2020; 6 years ago
- Country: Mexico
- Confederation: CONCACAF
- Number of clubs: 12
- Level on pyramid: 2
- Promotion to: Liga MX
- Relegation to: Liga Premier
- Domestic cup(s): Cup tournament Copa MX (2012–2020); Super cup Campeón de Ascenso (1997–2019)
- Last champions: Alebrijes de Oaxaca (2nd title)
- Most championships: Dorados de Sinaloa; León; Irapuato; Necaxa (4 titles each)
- Website: ascensomx.net
- Current: Apertura 2019 Ascenso MX season

Ascenso MX, officially as Ascenso BBVA MX for sponsorship reasons, was a professional association football league in Mexico and the second level of the Mexican football league system. The season was divided into two tournaments: Apertura (from July to December) and Clausura (from January to May). The champions of each tournament were decided by a final knockout phase, commonly known as Liguilla.

Formerly known as Primera División 'A' Profesional de México (1994–2009) and Liga de Ascenso de México (2009–2012). The league was held in 50 editions, the inaugural season was played in 1994–95 with Atlético Celaya crowned as the first champions.

The clubs promoted to Liga MX were the winners of the Campeón de Ascenso between the two champions of the season. The bottom club was relegated to Liga Premier. In 2020, the Ascenso MX was dissolved due to the COVID-19 pandemic and the league's lack of financial resources.

Twenty-seven clubs were champions at least once. Dorados de Sinaloa, León, Irapuato and Necaxa were the most successful clubs with four titles each, and Querétaro with three titles.

== History ==
=== Primera División 'A' Profesional de México (1994–2009) ===
In 1994, the FMF created the Primera División 'A' Profesional as an intermediate league between the Primera División and Segunda División, to try to reduce the gap between the clubs in the top division and the lower divisions. The project was under the direction of José Antonio García Rodríguez, then president of the Primera División. He envisioned the new division to be joined by the best clubs of the Segunda División and include clubs from the United States, Los Angeles Salsa and San Jose Black Hawks expressed a desire to join. FIFA declined the integration but established a new league with the best Segunda División sides. The inaugural season had fifteen founding clubs: Atlético Celaya, Atlético San Francisco, Atlético Yucatán, Caimanes de Tabasco, Deportivo Tepic, Gallos Blancos UAQ, Gallos de Aguascalientes, Guerreros de Acapulco, Irapuato, La Piedad, Marte, Pachuca, San Luis, Tijuana Stars and Zacatepec. In 2006, the number of clubs increased from 20 to 24, and geographically separated into two groups (A and B).

=== Liga de Ascenso de México (2009–2012) ===
In 2009, the FMF officially renamed the league as Liga de Ascenso de México, reduced the participating clubs to 17, and changed the format competition, the groups were eliminated in the regular phase. The Apertura 2010 had 18 participating clubs. Alebrijes de Oaxaca was the 16th club to join the league, Alebrijes was partly formed by consolidating Segunda División side Tecamachalco which had won promotion to Ascenso MX in 2012, but did not fulfill infrastructural requirements set by the FMF.

=== Ascenso MX (2012–2020) ===
Prior to the start of the 2012–13 season, the organization Liga MX-Ascenso MX was created to replaced the FMF as the main organizing body of the competition. The league was rebranded as Ascenso MX with a new logo and competition format, the clubs do not need the FMF certification to be promoted and the division no longer used format with groups in regular phase. From 2011 to 2016, the relegation to Segunda División was suspended. On 13 April 2020, Liga MX and Ascenso MX President Enrique Bonilla announced the dissolution of the league after the Clausura 2020, due to the COVID-19 pandemic and the league's lack of financial resources. On 17 April 2020, the Ascenso MX was officially replaced by the Liga de Expansión MX.

== Stadiums and locations ==
Location of Ascenso MX clubs in the 2019–20 season.

Club	City	Stadium	Capacity
Alebrijes de Oaxaca	Oaxaca	Tecnológico de Oaxaca	14,598
Atlante	Cancún	Andrés Quintana Roo	17,289
Cafetaleros de Tapachula	Tuxtla Gutiérrez	Víctor Manuel Reyna	29,001
Celaya	Celaya	Miguel Alemán Valdés	23,182
Cimarrones de Sonora	Hermosillo	Héroe de Nacozari	18,747
Correcaminos UAT	Ciudad Victoria	Marte R. Gómez	10,520
Dorados de Sinaloa	Culiacán	Dorados	20,108
Leones Negros UdeG	Guadalajara	Jalisco	55,020
Mineros de Zacatecas	Zacatecas	Carlos Vega Villalba	20,068
Tampico Madero	Tampico & Ciudad Madero	Tamaulipas	19,667
Venados	Mérida	Carlos Iturralde	15,087
Zacatepec	Zacatepec	Agustín "Coruco" Díaz	24,313

== Performances ==
Rank	Club	Titles	Runners-up	Seasons
1	Dorados de Sinaloa^{2}	4	6	Ape–2003, Cla–2007, Cla–2015, Ape–2016
1	León^{1}	4	3	Cla–2003, Cla–2004, Cla–2008, Cla–2012
1	Irapuato^{3}	4	2	Inv–1999, Ver–2000, Ape–2002, Cla–2011
1	Necaxa^{1}	4	2	Ape–2009, Bic–2010, Ape–2014, Cla–2016
5	Querétaro^{1}	3	0	Cla–2005, Cla–2006, Ape–2008
6	La Piedad^{3}	2	3	Ver–2001, Ape–2012
6	Pachuca^{1}	2	1	1995–96, Inv–1997
6	San Luis^{5}	2	1	Ver–2002, Ape–2004
6	Atlético San Luis^{1}	2	1	Ape–2018, Cla–2019
6	Tigres UANL^{1}	2	0	Inv–1996, Ver–1997
6	Atlético Yucatán/ Mérida^{2}	2	0	Inv–1998, Cla–2009
6	Puebla^{1}	2	0	Ape–2005, Ape–2006
6	Alebrijes de Oaxaca^{2}	2	0	Ape–2017, Ape–2019
14	Tijuana^{1}	1	2	Ape–2010
14	Correcaminos UAT^{2}	1	2	Ape–2011
14	Juárez^{1}	1	2	Ape–2015
14	Tigrillos UANL^{5}	1	1	Ver–1998
14	Veracruz^{5}	1	1	Inv–2001
14	Indios de Ciudad Juárez^{5}	1	1	Ape–2007
14	Leones Negros UdeG^{2}	1	1	Ape–2013
14	Toros Neza^{4}	1	1	Cla–2013
14	Lobos BUAP^{5}	1	1	Cla–2017
14	Atlético Celaya^{3}	1	0	1994–95
14	Unión de Curtidores^{5}	1	0	Ver–1999
14	Gallos de Aguascalientes^{5}	1	0	Inv–2000
14	Estudiantes Tecos^{4}	1	0	Cla–2013
14	Cafetaleros de Tapachula^{5}	1	0	Cla–2018
28	Cruz Azul Hidalgo^{2}	0	3	—
28	Zacatepec^{3}	0	3	—
28	Atlante^{1}	0	2	—
28	Coras^{5}	0	1	—
28	Salamanca^{5}	0	1	—
28	Atlético Hidalgo^{3}	0	1	—
28	Atlético Mexiquense^{5}	0	1	—
28	Chivas Tijuana^{5}	0	1	—
28	Cobras de Juárez^{5}	0	1	—
28	Gallos Blancos de Hermosillo^{5}	0	1	—
28	Real Sociedad de Zacatecas^{5}	0	1	—
28	Tapatío^{2}	0	1	—

Notes

1. Currently in Liga MX.
2. Currently in Liga de Expansión MX.
3. Currently in Liga Premier.
4. Currently on hiatus.
5. Defunct.

== Campeón de Ascenso ==
Campeón de Ascenso was a domestic super cup contested by the Ascenso MX champions of the Apertura and Clausura tournaments, it was held between 1997 and 2019.

The trophy was contested in 23 editions, the inaugural match was played in 1997 with Tigres UANL crowned as the first champions. Seventeen clubs were champions at least once. Dorados de Sinaloa, Irapuato, Querétaro, Necaxa, La Piedad and San Luis were the most successful clubs with two titles each.

=== Performances ===
Rank	Club	Titles	Runners-up	Seasons
1	Dorados de Sinaloa	2	2	2004, 2015
1	Irapuato	2	1	2000,^{1} 2003
1	Querétaro	2	1	2006, 2009
1	Necaxa	2	1	2010,^{1} 2016
1	La Piedad	2	0	2001, 2013
1	San Luis	2	0	2002, 2005
7	León	1	3	2012
7	Puebla	1	1	2007
7	Tigres UANL	1	0	1997^{1}
7	Pachuca	1	0	1998
7	Unión de Curtidores	1	0	1999
7	Indios de Ciudad Juárez	1	0	2008
7	Tijuana	1	0	2011
7	Leones Negros UdeG	1	0	2014
7	Lobos BUAP	1	0	2017
7	Cafetaleros de Tapachula	1	0	2018
7	Atlético San Luis	1	0	2019^{1}
18	Atlético Yucatán/ Mérida	0	2	—
18	Tigrillos UANL	0	1	—
18	Gallos de Aguascalientes	0	1	—
18	Veracruz	0	1	—
18	Correcaminos UAT	0	1	—
18	Toros Neza	0	1	—
18	Estudiantes Tecos	0	1	—
18	Juárez	0	1	—
18	Alebrijes de Oaxaca	0	1	—

Notes

1. Automatic winners of the trophy and promotion for winning both league tournaments of the season.

== Sponsorship ==
From 2012 to 2019, sponsor of the league.

BBVA México was the official main sponsor of the league, from its rebranding in 2012 until its abolition in 2019, hence it was officially known as Ascenso BBVA MX. The official ball of the league was manufactured by Voit.

== Promotion and relegation ==
Club	Promoted	Relegated
Irapuato	2 (1999–00, 2002–03)	1 (2005–06)
Pachuca	2 (1995–96, 1997–98)	—
La Piedad	2 (2000–01, 2012–13 (Note: Veracruz bought the franchise of La Piedad, taking its spot in the Primera División.))	—
San Luis	2 (2001–02, 2004–05)	—
Dorados de Sinaloa	2 (2014–15)	—
Querétaro	2 (2005–06, 2008–09)	—
Necaxa	2 (2009–10, 2015–16)	—
Tijuana	1 (2010–11)	1 (2007–08)
Atlético Celaya	1 (1994–95)	—
Tigres UANL	1 (1996–97)	—
Unión de Curtidores	1 (1998–99 (Note: Puebla bought the franchise of Unión de Curtidores, taking its spot in the Primera División.))	—
Veracruz	1 (2001–02 (Note: Veracruz gained automatic promotion due to expansion in the Primera División.))	—
Puebla	1 (2006–07)	—
Indios de Ciudad Juárez	1 (2007–08)	—
León	1 (2011–12)	—
Leones Negros UdeG	1 (2013–14)	—
Lobos BUAP	1 (2016–17)	—
Atlético San Luis	1 (2018–19)	—
Cafetaleros de Tapachula	1 (2017–18 (Note: Cafetaleros did not obtain certification for promotion.))	—
Halcones de Querétaro	—	2 (1999–00, 2000–01)
Jaguares de Tapachula	—	2 (2003–04, 2008–09)
Caimanes de Tabasco	—	1 (1994–95)
Coras	—	1 (1995–96)
Inter de Tijuana	—	1 (1996–97)
Marte	—	1 (1997–98)
Atlético San Francisco	—	1 (1998–99)
Gavilanes de Nuevo Laredo	—	1 (2002–03)
Trotamundos de Tijuana	—	1 (2003–04)
Altamira	—	1 (2004–05)
Dorados de Tijuana	—	1 (2005–06)
Monarcas Morelia A	—	1 (2006–07)
Pumas Morelos	—	1 (2012–13)
Zacatepec	—	1 (2013–14 (Note: Zacatepec bought the franchise of Cruz Azul Hidalgo, taking its spot in the Primera División.))
Loros UdeC	—	1 (2016–17)
Murciélagos	—	1 (2017–18)

== Player records ==
=== Top goalscorers ===
Season	Player	Club	Goals
1994–95	(Brazil) Marco de Almeida	Marte	15
1995–96	(Argentina) Lorenzo Sáez	Pachuca	30
Inv–1996	(Brazil) Nílson Esidio Mora	Tigres UANL	11
Ver–1997	(Mexico) Ángel Lemus (Honduras) Carlos Pavón	Irapuato; Correcaminos UAT	12
Inv–1997	(Colombia) Niver Arboleda	Zacatepec	17
Ver–1998	(Uruguay) Daniel Fasciolli (Uruguay) Carlos Morales (Brazil) Valtencir Gomes	Correcaminos UAT; Pachuca; Tigrillos UANL	12
Inv–1998	(Argentina) Cristián Ariel Morales	Irapuato	19
Ver–1999	(Mexico) Ángel Lemus	San Luis	16
Inv–1999	(Argentina) Cristián Ariel Morales	Irapuato	17
Ver–2000	(Spain) Carlos Muñoz	Lobos BUAP	15
Inv–2000	(Mexico) Christian Patiño	La Piedad	16
Ver–2001	(Uruguay) Héctor Giménez	Gallos de Aguascalientes	16
Inv–2001	(Argentina) Héctor Álvarez	Tampico Madero	16
Ver–2002	(Argentina) Ariel González	Querétaro	15
Ape–2002	(Argentina) Héctor Álvarez	Zacatepec	23
Cla–2003	(Argentina) Héctor Álvarez	Zacatepec	16
Ape–2003	(Argentina) Héctor Álvarez	León	17
Cla–2004	(Argentina) Mauro Gerk (Mexico) Francisco Bravo	Celaya; Zacatepec	18
Ape–2004	(Argentina) Ariel González	San Luis	16
Cla–2005	(Argentina) Rubén Darío Gigena	Cruz Azul Hidalgo	17
Ape–2005	(Mexico) Mauricio Romero	Coyotes de Sonora	16
Cla–2006	(Argentina) Diego Olsina	Delfines de Coatzacoalcos	15
Ape–2006	(Uruguay) Álvaro González	Puebla	14
Cla–2007	(Uruguay) Álvaro González	Puebla	16
Ape–2007	(Mexico) Mauricio Romero	León	14
Cla–2008	(Paraguay) Freddy Bareiro	León	17
Ape–2008	(Argentina) Mauro Gerk (Mexico) Raúl Enríquez	Querétaro; Tijuana	14
Cla–2009	(Uruguay) Sebastián Maz	Dorados de Sinaloa	15
Ape–2009	(Argentina) Ariel González	Irapuato	11
Bic–2010	(Argentina) Ariel González (Argentina) Carlos Casartelli	Irapuato; León	11
Ape–2010	(Brazil) Eder Pacheco	Alacranes de Durango	13
Cla–2011	(Panama) Blas Pérez	León	14
Ape–2011	(Argentina) Nicolás Saucedo	Correcaminos UAT	11
Cla–2012	(Uruguay) Sebastián Maz	León	13
Ape–2012	(Mexico) Víctor Lojero (Mexico) Rodrigo Prieto	Necaxa; Toros Neza	11
Cla–2013	(Mexico) Víctor Lojero	Necaxa	12
Ape–2013	(Paraguay) Gustavo Ramírez	Alebrijes de Oaxaca	11
Cla–2014	(Panama) Roberto Nurse	Correcaminos UAT	12
Ape–2014	(Mexico) Diego Jiménez (Venezuela) Giancarlo Maldonado	Lobos BUAP; Atlante	10
Cla–2015	(Panama) Roberto Nurse (Brazil) Leandro Carrijó	Dorados de Sinaloa; Atlético San Luis	10
Ape–2015	(Ecuador) Carlos Garcés	Atlante	10
Cla–2016	(Mexico) Ismael Valadéz	Cafetaleros de Tapachula	10
Ape–2016	(Panama) Roberto Nurse	Mineros de Zacatecas	16
Cla–2017	(Mexico) Diego Jiménez	Lobos BUAP	10
Ape–2017	(Mexico) Luis Madrigal	Alebrijes de Oaxaca	12
Cla–2018	(Mexico) Guillermo Martínez	Mineros de Zacatecas	11
Ape–2018	(Argentina) Nicolás Ibáñez (Panama) Roberto Nurse	Atlético San Luis; Mineros de Zacatecas	8
Cla–2019	(Argentina) Nicolás Ibáñez	Atlético San Luis	11
Ape–2019	(Mexico) Víctor Mañón	Loros UdeC	8

== See also ==
- Sport in Mexico
- Football in Mexico
- Mexican football league system
- Mexican Football Federation
- Liga MX
- Liga de Expansión MX
- Liga Premier
- Liga TDP
