= Nacional Tijuana =

- Full name: Club de Fútbol Nacional de Tijuana
- Nickname: Nacional
- Founded: 1999
- Dissolved: 2003
- Ground: Estadio del Cerro Colorado; Tijuana, Baja California, Mexico
- Capacity: 12,000
- League: Primera División 'A' de México
Home colours	Away colours

Club de Fútbol Nacional de Tijuana was a Mexican football team that played in the Primera División 'A' de México before their disappearance and relocation to Mérida, Yucatán. They played their games in the city of Tijuana, Baja California.

They managed to be in the Primera División 'A' de México in 1999, which was composed primarily of Mexican players, something very representative since that year that most of the players were from Tijuana who attempted to promote the team to the Primera División de México.

== History ==
After the relegation of the Colibríes de Morelos from the Primera División de México in the Clausura 2003, the team was possessed by the Federación Mexicana de Fútbol (FMF) because the team had not paid the fines imposed by Jorge Rodriguez Marié. The franchise was sold and moved to Tijuana, Baja California and became Dorados de Tijuana, the eleventh before was known simply as Trotamundos Tijuana. As the team was made by the Federación Mexicana de Fútbol (FMF) the owners were forced to create another team in the same region and that was how the Nacional de Tijuana team emerged.

Before then, Nacional de Tijuana was the name of the successor of Chivas Tijuana after the Federación Mexicana de Fútbol (FMF) decided in 1999 that there could not be two clubs called Chivas.

Then, the team had a very bad season and dragged the issue of the percentage of the old franchise, causing it to relegate to the Segunda División de México, soon to be gone from Primera División 'A' de México due to the increase in teams. The franchise was later sold and moved to Mérida, Yucatán and renamed Mérida Fútbol Club.

== Previous teams ==
The following teams were based in Tijuana, Baja California and disappeared either due to their franchise being purchased or their relegation to the Segunda División de México:

- Club Tijuana: changed owner and name to Dorados de Tijuana
- Chivas Tijuana: subsidiary of Chivas
- Trotamundos Tijuana: moved to Salamanca, Guanajuato and converted to Trotamundos Salamanca
- Tijuana Stars
- Inter Tijuana
