= Estadio Benito Juárez =

Former stadium in Oaxaca, Mexico

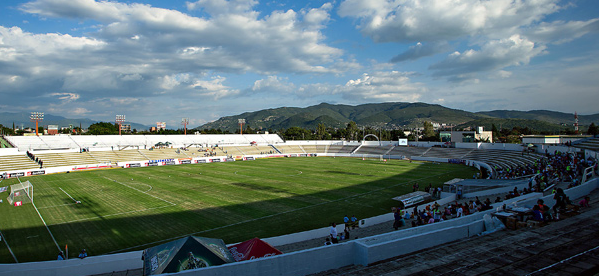
- Interactive map of Estadio Benito Juárez
- Location: Oaxaca City, Oaxaca, Mexico
- Coordinates: 17°3′52.99″N 96°42′17.46″W
- Capacity: 12,500
- Surface: Grass

Construction
- Opened: December 1987

Estadio Benito Juárez was a stadium in Oaxaca City, Mexico. It had a capacity for 12,500 people for sports events and 20,000 for non-sport events. It was founded in December 1987 in an inaugural football match between the Chapulineros de Oaxaca and Pioneros de Cancún. The stadium was closed in 2015 and demolished the following year. It was demolished to make way for the Oaxaca Cultural and Convention Center.
