= Tigres UANL Premier =

- Full name: Club de Fútbol Tigres de la Universidad Autónoma de Nuevo León Premier
- Nicknames: Tigres (Tigers); Felinos (Felines); Auriazules (Gold-and-Blues); Universitarios (College Ones); La U de Nuevo León (The U of Nuevo León)
- Founded: 14 July 2015; 11 years ago
- Dissolved: 2018; 8 years ago
- Ground: Instalaciones de Zuazua; General Zuazua, Nuevo León, Mexico
- Capacity: 800
- Owner(s): UANL; CEMEX (through Sinergia Deportiva)
- Chairman: Miguel Ángel Garza
- League: Liga Premier - Serie A
- Apertura 2017: Preseason
- Website: https://www.tigres.com.mx/
Home colours	Away colours

Tigres UANL Premier was the Liga Premier affiliate team of Tigres UANL. They played in the lower division to provide a training ground for prospective players aspiring to play in the Primera División de México. They played in San Nicolás de los Garza, Nuevo León. With the changes made to the Primera División "A", Tigres B disappeared from the Liga de Ascenso before starting the Apertura 2009. But, Cachorros UANL appeared in the Segunda Division de Mexico in 2010–11 Season and disappeared after 2014–15 season, but moved to Liga Premier as Tigres Liga Premier beginning 2015–16 season.

== History ==
They were born in 1991 as a Third Division team, and they were then called Tigrillos UANL (Tigrillos means "little tigers"). They played in Monterrey in those times.

In 1994, they won the Third Division championship and gained a right to participate in the Second Division. A few years later, in 1996, under the tutorship of Osvaldo Batocletti, they were again promoted, this time to Primera Division A.

The 1996 and 1997 seasons where the same that Tigres UANL were relegated to the Primera Division A. This created the unique circumstance that both the main team and the affiliate competed in the same division.

However, Mexican rules forbade two teams to have the same name, so they were renamed as simply U de NL (in reference to the UANL which they represent, despite having just been privatized). They maintained the colors, but were moved to Saltillo. During these two seasons the two only brotherly clásicos, a derby played between the two Tigres teams, were played.

After Tigres UANL were promoted again to First Division, U de NL changed its name again to Tigrillos.

In 1998, they won the Primera División A Verano 1998, however they were not promoted to First Division, because they were defeated by CF Pachuca in the promotion game (between the champion of Verano and the champion of Invierno championships, today Verano has been changed to Clausura and Invierno has been changed to Apertura). CF Pachuca has defeated Tigres UANL in the First Division finals twice, creating a rivalry between CF Pachuca and Tigres UANL fans.

- 1st Final since Verano 1998: Tigrillos then played the Final of the Verano 2002 against Club San Luis, and achieved only runner-up position.
- 1st Changes and Relocation: Due to the cost of maintaining the affiliate, in 2003, 'Tigrillos' moved to Mexico City under the administration of Club América and were called Tigrillos Coapa. This only lasted a year.
- 2nd Changes and Relocation: In 2004 they moved to Los Mochis and where named Tigrillos Broncos. In Clausura 2005 they were renamed Tigres Los Mochis.
- 3rd Relocation: The 2007–08 season, has Tigres Los Mochis moving to Reynosa, Tamaulipas.
- 3rd Changes and 4th Relocation: One Season Later, has Tigres Reynosa moving to San Nicolás de los Garza, Nuevo León, and become the Tigres B. Until Then, Tigres B was dissolved after the Clausura 2009.
- One Season Later (2010–11), has Cachorros UANL in the Segunda División de México.

== Honours ==
- Primera "A" League Championship: 1

Verano 1998

- Primera "A": 0

Runner-up: (1): Verano 2002

- Second Division Championship: 1

1995-96

- Third Division Championship: 1

1993-94
