= Real Sociedad de Zacatecas =

Mexican football club

- Full name: Real Sociedad Deportiva de Zacatecas, SA de CV
- Nickname: La Real
- Founded: 1996
- Dissolved: 2003
- Ground: Estadio Francisco Villa, Zacatecas
- Capacity: 18,000
- Chairman: Grupo Modelo
- League: Ascenso Mx
- Verano 2003: 8º
Home colours	Away colours

Real Sociedad de Zacatecas was a Mexican football team from Zacatecas, Mexico that played for 7 years in the Ascenso MX.

== History ==
Real Sociedad Deportiva de Zacatecas was founded in 1996 by the Mexican beer brewery Modelo. In 1997 the club would reach its first final against Pachuca FC which the club would go on to lose. The club never played in the first division and in 2003 the club folded due to lack of the owners and the governor of Zacatecas fail to come up with a new contract. In 2014 the second division returnes to Zacatecas with the new Franchise of Mineros de Zacatecas which is considered the successor of La Real.

== Honours ==
- Primera A
  - Runners-up (1): Invierno 1997

=== Uniform ===
1996 Home

Marcas Patrocinadoras:

- 1996–97 : (Spain) Joma
- 1997-02 : (Mexico) Corona Sport
- 2002–03 : (Mexico) Atlética
