= Primera División de México Verano 2002 =

Primera División de México
- Season: 2001−02
- Champions: América (9th title)
- Relegated: León
- Champions' Cup: América; Necaxa
- Top goalscorer: Sebastián Abreu (19 goals)

Primera División de México (Mexican First Division) Verano 2002 was the 2002 edition of the Primera División de México, crowning Mexico's spring champion in football. América won the championship for the ninth time in its history and thus qualified for the CONCACAF Champions' Cup 2003, ending a decade-long trophy-less drought.

== Clubs ==
Location of the Primera División Verano 2002 teams

Team	City	Stadium
América	Mexico City	Azteca
Atlante	Mexico City	Azul
Atlas	Guadalajara, Jalisco	Jalisco
Celaya	Celaya, Guanajuato	Miguel Alemán Valdés
Cruz Azul	Mexico City	Azul
Guadalajara	Guadalajara, Jalisco	Jalisco
La Piedad	La Piedad, Michoacán	Juan N. López
León	León, Guanajuato	León
Morelia	Morelia, Michoacán	Morelos
Monterrey	Monterrey, Nuevo León	Tecnológico
Necaxa	Mexico City	Azteca
Pachuca	Pachuca, Hidalgo	Hidalgo
Puebla	Puebla, Puebla	Cuauhtémoc
Santos Laguna	Torreón, Coahuila	Corona
Toluca	Toluca, State of Mexico	Nemesio Díez
UAG	Zapopan, Jalisco	Tres de Marzo
UANL	San Nicolás de los Garza, Nuevo León	Universitario
UNAM	Mexico City	Olímpico Universitario
Veracruz	Veracruz, Veracruz	Luis "Pirata" Fuente

Notes

1. Veracruz bought the place of Irapuato.

== Regular phase ==
Group 1
Pos	Team	Pld	W	D	L	GF	GA	GD	Pts	Qualification
1	Atlas	18	8	6	4	30	28	+2	30	Directly qualified to the Liguilla (Playoffs)
2	Cruz Azul	18	7	6	5	32	29	+3	27	Qualified for the Repechage
3	Guadalajara	18	5	7	6	22	21	+1	22	
4	Monterrey	18	5	5	8	21	28	−7	20	
5	Celaya	18	5	5	8	19	29	−10	20	

Source: MedioTiempo

Group 2
Pos	Team	Pld	W	D	L	GF	GA	GD	Pts	Qualification
1	La Piedad	18	12	1	5	35	17	+18	37	Directly qualified to the Liguilla (Playoffs)
2	Toluca	18	10	5	3	35	17	+18	35	Directly qualified to the Liguilla (Playoffs)
3	Santos Laguna	18	9	4	5	42	31	+11	31	Qualified for the Repechage
4	Morelia	18	8	5	5	34	25	+9	29	Qualified for the Repechage
5	Veracruz	18	7	3	8	22	30	−8	24	

Source: MedioTiempo

Group 3
Pos	Team	Pld	W	D	L	GF	GA	GD	Pts	Qualification
1	Necaxa	18	7	6	5	34	23	+11	27	Directly qualified to the Liguilla (Playoffs)
2	América	18	7	6	5	27	23	+4	27 (Note: América was qualified directly because of goal difference.)	Directly qualified to the Liguilla (Playoffs)
3	Atlante	18	5	5	8	23	29	−6	20	
4	UAG	18	2	8	8	25	34	−9	14	
5	León	18	2	4	12	17	36	−19	10	

Source: MedioTiempo
Notes:

Group 4
Pos	Team	Pld	W	D	L	GF	GA	GD	Pts	Qualification
1	UNAM	18	9	5	4	30	22	+8	32	Directly qualified to the Liguilla (Playoffs)
2	UANL	18	7	6	5	25	23	+2	27	Qualified for the Repechage
3	Pachuca	18	6	4	8	26	23	+3	22	
4	Puebla	18	2	5	11	24	45	−21	11	

Source: MedioTiempo

== League table ==
Pos	Team	Pld	W	D	L	GF	GA	GD	Pts	Qualification
1	La Piedad	18	12	1	5	35	17	+18	37	Directly qualified to the Liguilla (Playoffs)
2	Toluca	18	10	5	3	35	17	+18	35	Directly qualified to the Liguilla (Playoffs)
3	UNAM	18	9	5	4	30	22	+8	32	Directly qualified to the Liguilla (Playoffs)
4	Santos Laguna	18	9	4	5	42	31	+11	31	Qualified for the Repechage
5	Atlas	18	8	6	4	30	28	+2	30	Directly qualified to the Liguilla (Playoffs)
6	Morelia	18	8	5	5	34	25	+9	29	Qualified for the Repechage
7	Necaxa	18	7	6	5	34	23	+11	27	Directly qualified to the Liguilla (Playoffs)
8	América	18	7	6	5	27	23	+4	27	Directly qualified to the Liguilla (Playoffs)
9	Cruz Azul	18	7	6	5	32	29	+3	27	Qualified for the Repechage
10	UANL	18	7	6	5	25	23	+2	27	Qualified for the Repechage
11	Veracruz	18	7	3	8	22	30	−8	24	
12	Guadalajara	18	5	7	6	22	21	+1	22	
13	Pachuca	18	6	4	8	26	33	−7	22	
14	Atlante	18	5	5	8	23	29	−6	20	
15	Monterrey	18	5	5	8	21	28	−7	20	
16	Celaya	18	5	5	8	19	29	−10	20	
17	UAG	18	2	8	8	25	34	−9	14	
18	Puebla	18	2	5	11	24	45	−21	11	
19	León	18	2	4	12	17	36	−19	10	

Source: MedioTiempo

== Results ==
Home \ Away	AME	ATE	ATS	CEL	CAZ	GDL	LAP	LEO	MTY	MOR	NEC	PAC	PUE	SAN	TOL	UAG	UNL	UNM	VER
América	—	–	0–1	–	–	2–3	2–1	–	4–2	1–1	0–0	–	–	2–2	–	–	3–1	0–0	–
Atlante	0–1	—	2–3	–	–	0–0	0–1	–	2–0	–	1–1	–	3–3	2–1	–	–	2–1	1–1	–
Atlas	–	–	—	–	–	1–1	2–0	–	5–1	2–0	1–3	3–1	–	3–3	–	–	–	2–1	1–1
Celaya	2–2	2–1	0–0	—	–	–	0–4	–	0–1	–	2–2	–	1–3	–	–	2–0	1–0	3–4	–
Cruz Azul	2–0	3–1	4–2	1–0	—	–	1–5	3–1	–	–	–	–	–	–	2–2	3–1	2–3	–	–
Guadalajara	–	–	–	2–0	3–0	—	–	2–2	–	0–1	–	1–2	4–0	0–0	0–3	–	–	–	1–2
La Piedad	–	–	–	–	–	1–1	—	–	1–0	1–2	3–1	2–1	–	1–0	–	–	–	3–1	2–0
León	0–1	2–1	1–1	1–1	–	–	2–1	—	–	–	–	–	2–3	–	0–2	0–0	2–3	2–4	–
Monterrey	–	–	–	–	1–1	3–0	–	4–1	—	0–3	–	1–0	1–1	2–3	1–1	–	–	–	0–0
Morelia	–	2–3	–	2–0	1–3	–	–	2–0	–	—	–	4–1	5–2	–	0–0	2–2	–	–	2–2
Necaxa	–	–	–	–	1–1	0–1	–	2–0	3–1	1–2	—	3–0	3–0	4–1	–	–	–	–	3–0
Pachuca	3–2	1–2	–	1–1	2–1	–	–	2–1	–	–	–	—	–	–	1–2	2–2	–	–	3–2
Puebla	1–2	–	1–1	–	2–2	–	2–4	–	–	–	–	1–2	—	–	–	–	1–1	1–2	1–2
Santos Laguna	–	–	–	4–1	2–2	–	–	3–0	–	4–3	0–1	3–2	3–0	—	–	3–2	–	–	5–1
Toluca	2–1	0–0	5–1	0–1	–	–	3–1	–	–	–	3–1	–	–	–	—	2–2	3–1	0–2	–
UAG	2–2	4–0	1–2	–	–	1–1	0–2	–	2–3	–	3–3	–	2–1	–	–	—	1–1	0–3	–
UANL	–	–	3–0	–	–	1–0	0–2	–	0–0	1–1	3–3	1–1	–	2–1	–	–	—	1–0	–
UNAM	–	–	–	–	0–0	2–2	–	–	1–0	2–1	1–0	1–1	–	3–4	–	–	–	—	2–1
Veracruz	0–2	3–2	–	1–2	2–1	–	–	1–0	–	–	–	–	–	–	2–1	2–0	0–2	–	—

Updated to match(es) played on 27 April 2002. Source: RSSSF
Legend: Blue = home team win; Yellow = draw; Red = away team win.

== Top goalscorers ==
Players sorted first by goals scored, then by last name. Only regular season goals listed.

Rank	Player	Club	Goals
1	(Uruguay) Sebastian Abreu	Cruz Azul	19
2	(Paraguay) José Cardozo	Toluca	14
3	(Mexico) Jared Borgetti	Santos Laguna	13
3	(Brazil) Claudinho	La Piedad	13
5	(Argentina) José Luis Calderón	Atlas	11
5	(Uruguay) Martín Rodríguez	Veracruz	11
7	(Brazil) Alex Fernandes	Morelia	10
8	(Mexico) Héctor Altamirano	Santos Laguna	9
9	(Chile) Reinaldo Navia	UAG	8
9	(Chile) Iván Zamorano	América	8

Source: MedioTiempo

== Final phase (Liguilla) ==
=== Repechage ===
May 2, 2002
20:00

Cruz Azul	1–2	Morelia
Abreu 56' (pen.)	Report	Alex 15'; C. Morales 45'

Estadio Azul, Mexico City
Referee: Armando Archundia (Estado de México)
May 5, 2002
20:00

Morelia	3–2	Cruz Azul
Íñiguez 54'; Noriega 59', 85' (pen.)	Report	Zepeda 41'; Abreu 48'

Estadio Morelos, Morelia
Referee: Felipe Ramos Rizo (Mexico City)

Morelia won 5–3 on aggregate.

May 2, 2002
20:30

UANL	2–2	Santos Laguna
Enílton 45'; Thomas 90' (pen.)	Report	Lillingston 25'; Gallaga 72'

Estadio Universitario, San Nicolás de los Garza
Referee: Marco Antonio Rodríguez (Mexico City)
May 5, 2002
16:00

Santos Laguna	1–1	UANL
Altamirano 87' (pen.)	Report	Thomas 12'

Estadio Corona, Torreón
Referee: Antonio Marrufo (Chihuahua)

3–3 on aggregate. Santos Laguna advanced for being the higher seeded team..

=== Bracket ===
Quarterfinals
4	Santos Laguna (s)	1	2	3
5	Atlas	2	1	3
2	Toluca	0	0	0
7	Necaxa	1	2	3
3	UNAM	3	1	4
6	Morelia	1	0	1
1	La Piedad	1	1	2
8	América	3	3	6

Semifinals
4	Santos Laguna	0	0	0
7	Necaxa	1	0	1
3	UNAM	0	1	1
8	América	0	2	2

Finals
7	Necaxa	2	0	2
8	América (a.s.d.e.t.)	0	3	3

=== Quarterfinals ===
May 9, 2002
20:45

Atlas	2–1	Santos Laguna
Calderón 25', 27'	Report	Gomes 15' (pen.)

Estadio Jalisco, Guadalajara
Referee: José Abramo Lira (Nuevo León)
May 12, 2002
16:00

Santos Laguna	2–1	Atlas
Caniza 73'; Lillingston 89'	Report	Pajuelo 82'

Estadio Corona, Torreón
Referee: Felipe Ramos Rizo (Mexico City)

3–3 on aggregate. Santos Laguna advanced for being the higher seeded team.

May 8, 2002
20:00

Necaxa	1–0	Toluca
Sosa 10'	Report

Estadio Azteca, Mexico City
Referee: Gilberto Alcalá Pineda (Mexico City)
May 11, 2002
15:00

Toluca	0–2	Necaxa
	Report	Zague 80'; Castro 90+4'

Estadio Nemesio Díez, Toluca
Referee: Eduardo Brizio Carter (Mexico City)

Necaxa won 3–0 on aggregate.

May 9, 2002
20:00

Morelia	1–3	UNAM
Alex 74'	Report	Müller 19'; López 75', 77'

Estadio Morelos, Morelia
Referee: Marco Antonio Rodríguez (Mexico City)
May 12, 2002
16:00

UNAM	1–0	Morelia
Márquez Lugo 30'	Report

Estadio Olímpico Universitario, Mexico City
Referee: Armando Archundia (Estado de México)

UNAM won 4–1 on aggregate.

May 9, 2002
20:00

América	3–1	La Piedad
Patiño 16'; Ríos 40'; Castillo 90'	Report	Medina 83'

Estadio Azteca, Mexico City
Referee: José de Jesús Robles
May 12, 2002
14:00

La Piedad	1–3	América
Medina 58'	Report	Patiño 17'; Ortíz 29'; Mendoza 56'

Estadio Juan N. López, La Piedad
Referee: Antonio Marrufo (Chihuahua)

América won 6–2 on aggregate.

=== Semifinals ===
May 16, 2002
18:30

Necaxa	1–0	Santos Laguna
Sosa 19'	Report

Estadio Azteca, Mexico City
Referee: Antonio Marrufo (Chihuahua)
May 19, 2002
16:00

Santos Laguna	0–0	Necaxa
	Report

Estadio Corona, Torreón
Referee: Marco Antonio Rodríguez (Mexico City)

Necaxa won 1–0 on aggregate.

May 14, 2002
20:00

América	0–0	UNAM
	Report

Estadio Azteca, Mexico City
Referee: Armando Archundia (Estado de México)
May 18, 2002
18:00

UNAM	1–2	América
Müller 43'	Report	España 6' (o.g.); Patiño 67'

Estadio Olímpico Universitario, Mexico City
Referee: Felipe Ramos Rizo (Mexico City)

América won 2–1 on aggregate.

=== Finals ===
May 23, 2002
20:00

América	0–2	Necaxa
	Report	Ruiz 12'; Zague 42'

Estadio Azteca, Mexico City
Referee: Marco Antonio Rodríguez (Mexico City)

First leg

América:
GK	25	(Mexico) Adolfo Ríos
DF	3	(Mexico) José Antonio Castro
DF	16	(Chile) Ricardo Rojas
DF	5	(Mexico) Duilio Davino
DF	28	(Mexico) Raúl Salinas		(substituted off) 84'
MF	6	(Mexico) Raúl Lara
MF	9	(Mexico) Álvaro Ortiz
MF	10	(Argentina) Hugo Castillo		(substituted off) 69'
MF	27	(Mexico) Christian Patiño
FW	9	(Chile) Iván Zamorano	(yellow card) 16'
FW	17	(Mexico) Jesús Mendoza		(substituted off) 62'
Substitutions:
GK	1	(Mexico) Hugo Pineda
DF	66	(Mexico) Carlos Infante
MF	14	(Mexico) Octavio Valdez		(substituted on) 84'
MF	64	(Mexico) Manuel Ríos		(substituted on) 62'
FW	8	(Uruguay) Marcelo Lipatín		(substituted on) 69'
FW	65	(Mexico) Moctezuma Serrato
Manager:
(Mexico) Manuel Lapuente

Necaxa:
GK	25	(Mexico) Nicolás Navarro	(yellow card) 89'
DF	2	(Mexico) Diego Martínez
DF	3	(Mexico) Miguel Acosta
DF	8	(Mexico) Salvador Cabrera	(yellow card) 45'
DF	5	(Mexico) José Luis Montes de Oca	(yellow card) 59' (yellow-red card) 80'
MF	99	(Mexico) Carlos González
MF	6	(Mexico) Fabián Peña	(yellow card) 55'
MF	18	(Mexico) Víctor Ruiz
MF	8	(Mexico) Luis Ernesto Pérez	(yellow card) 33'
FW	26	(Mexico) Ángel Sosa		(substituted off) 69'
FW	10	(Mexico) Zague		(substituted off) 66'
Substitutions:
GK	12	(Mexico) Isaac Mizrahi
DF	15	(Mexico) Edgar Solano		(substituted on) 86'
DF	17	(Mexico) Jose Nuñez
MF	5	(Colombia) Carlos Gutiérrez		(substituted on) 69'
MF	35	(Mexico) Rodolfo Espinoza
MF	52	(Mexico) Juan Carlos Franco
FW	9	(Colombia) Carlos Castro		(substituted on) 66' (substituted off) 86'
Manager:
(Mexico) Raúl Arias

Second leg

May 26, 2002
18:00

Necaxa	0–3 (a.e.t.)	América
	Report	Patiño 58'; Zamorano 62'; Castillo 105+2'

Estadio Azteca, Mexico City
Referee: Armando Archundia (Estado de México)

América won 3–2 on aggregate.

Necaxa:
GK	25	(Mexico) Nicolás Navarro
DF	2	(Mexico) Diego Martínez	(yellow card) 99'
DF	3	(Mexico) Miguel Acosta
DF	8	(Mexico) Salvador Cabrera
DF	15	(Mexico) Edgar Solano
MF	99	(Mexico) Carlos González
MF	6	(Mexico) Fabián Peña
MF	18	(Mexico) Víctor Ruiz
MF	8	(Mexico) Luis Ernesto Pérez	(red card) 65'
FW	26	(Mexico) Ángel Sosa	(yellow card) 12'	(substituted off) 66'
FW	10	(Mexico) Zague	(yellow card) 41'
Substitutions:
GK	12	(Mexico) Isaac Mizrahi
DF	32	(Mexico) Salvador Arevalo
DF	17	(Mexico) Jose Nuñez
MF	5	(Colombia) Carlos Gutiérrez		(substituted on) 66'
MF	22	(Mexico) Miguel Ostersen
MF	35	(Mexico) Rodolfo Espinoza
MF	52	(Mexico) Juan Carlos Franco
FW	9	(Colombia) Carlos Castro
Manager:
(Mexico) Raúl Arias

América:
GK	25	(Mexico) Adolfo Ríos
DF	3	(Mexico) José Antonio Castro
DF	16	(Chile) Ricardo Rojas
DF	5	(Mexico) Duilio Davino		(substituted off) 50'
DF	45	(Mexico) Carlos Sánchez	(yellow card) 77'	(substituted off) 91'
DF	28	(Mexico) Raúl Salinas
MF	9	(Mexico) Álvaro Ortiz
MF	13	(Mexico) Pável Pardo		(substituted off) 46'
MF	10	(Argentina) Hugo Castillo
MF	27	(Mexico) Christian Patiño
FW	8	(Uruguay) Marcelo Lipatín	(yellow card) 99'
Substitutions:
GK	1	(Mexico) Hugo Pineda
DF	66	(Mexico) Carlos Infante		(substituted on) 46'
MF	6	(Mexico) Raúl Lara
MF	64	(Mexico) Manuel Ríos		(substituted on) 91'
MF	102	(Mexico) Francisco Torres
FW	9	(Chile) Iván Zamorano		(substituted on) 50'
FW	65	(Mexico) Moctezuma Serrato
Manager:
(Mexico) Manuel Lapuente

Champions

9th title

== Relegation ==
Pos.	Team	Pts.	Pld.	Ave.
15.	Puebla	121	104	1.1634
16.	Veracruz	81	70	1.1571
17.	Atlante	113	104	1.0865
18.	Celaya	108	104	1.0384
19.	León	103	104	0.9903

=== Relegation playoff ===
The Mexican Football Federation decided to increase the number of teams in the Primera División to 20 participants, so it was decided to play a promotion series between León, the last place in the Primera División relegation table, and Veracruz, Primera 'A' season runner-up. Finally, Veracruz was the winner, and the team was promoted to Primera División and León was relegated to Primera 'A'.

May 29, 2002
16:00

Veracruz	3–1	León
Casartelli 13', 44'; Juárez 61'	Report	Toledano 77'

Estadio Luis "Pirata" Fuente, Veracruz
June 1, 2002
20:30

León	0–0	Veracruz
	Report

Estadio León, León

Veracruz won 3–1 on aggregate.

After Veracruz Team in Primera A won the promotion, there was already two teams in Veracruz with the same name, for that reason, the owners decided to transfer the team promoted to Tuxtla Gutiérrez, where it was renamed as Jaguares de Chiapas.
