= 2001 Copa Merconorte =

Copa Merconorte 2001
Tournament details
- Dates: 31 July – 20 December 2001
- Teams: 16 (from 7 associations)

Final positions
- Champions: (Colombia) Millonarios (1st title)
- Runners-up: (Ecuador) Emelec

Tournament statistics
- Matches played: 50
- Goals scored: 146 (2.92 per match)
- Top scorer: (Ecuador) Otilino Tenorio (7)

The Copa Merconorte 2001 was the fourth and final edition of association football tournament Copa Merconorte held in 2001. Millonarios of Colombia defeated Emelec of Ecuador in the final. It was the first edition to include teams invited from the United States, the Kansas City Wizards and NY/NJ MetroStars. Several fixtures for the MetroStars were cancelled following the September 11 attacks.

== Participants ==
Country	Team
Bolivia (1 berth)	Blooming
Colombia (3 berths)	América de Cali
Colombia (3 berths)	Atlético Nacional
Colombia (3 berths)	Millonarios
Ecuador (3 berths)	Aucas
Ecuador (3 berths)	Barcelona
Ecuador (3 berths)	Emelec
Mexico (3 berths)	Guadalajara
Mexico (3 berths)	Necaxa
Mexico (3 berths)	Santos Laguna
Peru (3 berths)	Alianza Lima
Peru (3 berths)	Sporting Cristal
Peru (3 berths)	Universitario
United States (2 berth)	Kansas City Wizards
United States (2 berth)	MetroStars
Venezuela (1 berth)	Deportivo Italchacao

== Group stage ==
Each team played the other teams in the group twice during the group stage. The first place team advanced to the second round.

=== Group A ===
Pos	Team	Pld	W	D	L	GF	GA	GD	Pts	Qualification	(Mexico) NEC	(Colombia) ADC	(Peru) ALI	(Ecuador) SDA
1	(Mexico) Necaxa	6	5	0	1	12	5	+7	15	Advance to Semifinals	—	1–0	2–1	1–3
2	(Colombia) América de Cali	6	3	1	2	7	7	0	10		1–3	—	1–1	2–1
3	(Peru) Alianza Lima	6	1	2	3	8	10	−2	5		0–3	1–2	—	4–1
4	(Ecuador) Aucas	6	1	1	4	6	11	−5	4		0–2	0–1	1–1	—

Source: RSSSF.com
Legend: Blue = home team win; Yellow = draw; Red = away team win.
July 31

Aucas (Ecuador)	0–2	(Mexico) Necaxa
	Report	Moreno 64' (pen.); Pérez 89'

Estadio La Caldera del Sur, Quito, Ecuador

August 1

América de Cali (Colombia)	1–1	(Peru) Alianza Lima
Mafla 27'	Report	Quinteros 13'

Estadio Pascual Guerrero, Cali, Colombia

August 22

Alianza Lima (Peru)	4–1	(Ecuador) Aucas
Bazalar 21'; Gallardo 40', 88'; Grotto 83'	Report	de Jesús 18'

Estadio Alejandro Villanueva, Lima, Peru

August 28

Necaxa (Mexico)	1–0	(Colombia) América de Cali
Delgado 38' (pen.)	Report

Estadio Azteca, Mexico City, Mexico

September 12

Aucas (Ecuador)	0–1	(Colombia) América de Cali
	Report	Virviescas 90'

Estadio La Caldera del Sur, Quito, Ecuador

September 19

Necaxa (Mexico)	2–1	(Peru) Alianza Lima
Zague 8'; Pérez 16'	Report	Hernández 90'

Estadio Azteca, Mexico City, Mexico

September 25

Necaxa (Mexico)	1–3	(Ecuador) Aucas
Pérez 86'	Report	Zanatta 13', 14'; Duarte 32'

Estadio Azteca, Mexico City, Mexico

September 26

Alianza Lima (Peru)	1–2	(Colombia) América de Cali
Eduardo Esidio 30'	report	Mafla 57'; Garcia 64'

Estadio Alejandro Villanueva
Lima, Peru

October 9

Alianza Lima (Peru)	0–3	(Mexico) Necaxa
	report	Moreno 40', 55', 66'

Estadio Alejandro Villanueva
Lima, Peru

October 16

América de Cali (Colombia)	1–3	(Mexico) Necaxa
Mauricio Romero 89'	report	Luís Roberto Alves 4', 63'; Martínez Diego Alfonso 65'

Estadio Pascual Guerrero
Cali, Colombia

October 24

Aucas (Ecuador)	1–1	(Peru) Alianza Lima
Raúl Duarte 13'	report	Roberto Farfán 30'

Estadio La Caldera del Sur
Quito, Ecuador

November 1

América de Cali (Colombia)	2–1	(Ecuador) Aucas
Oscar Eduardo Villarreal 30'; Kilian Edwin Virviescas 45'	report	Raúl Duarte 58'

Estadio Pascual Guerrero
Cali, Colombia

=== Group B ===
Pos	Team	Pld	W	D	L	GF	GA	GD	Pts	Qualification	(Colombia) MIL	(Venezuela) ITA	(United States) MET	(Mexico) GUA
1	(Colombia) Millonarios	6	4	0	2	10	7	+3	12	Advance to Semifinals	—	5–0	2–1	2–0
2	(Venezuela) Deportivo Italchacao	6	4	0	2	9	8	+1	12		3–0	—	2–1	2–0
3	(United States) MetroStars	6	3	0	3	8	5	+3	9		0–1	2–0	—	2–0
4	(Mexico) Guadalajara	6	1	0	5	3	10	−7	3		3–0	0–2	0–2	—

Legend: Blue = home team win; Yellow = draw; Red = away team win.
August 9

MetroStars (United States)	2–0	(Venezuela) Deportivo Italchacao
Adolfo Valencia 23'; Mike Petke 47'	report

Giants Stadium
East Rutherford, United States

August 8

Guadalajara (Mexico)	3–0	(Colombia) Millonarios
Marco Antonio Ruiz 44'; Juan Antonio Torres 60'; Carlos Hermosillo 87'	report

Estadio Jalisco
Guadalajara, Mexico

August 23

Millonarios (Colombia)	5–0	(Venezuela) Deportivo Italchacao
Wilson Cano 41' (pen.), 64', 73'; Alexander Orrego 49'; Marcio Rodríguez 91'	report

Estadio El Campín
Bogotá, Colombia

August 29

Millonarios (Colombia)	2–1	(United States) MetroStars
Wilson Cano 1', 31'	report	Adolfo Valencia 69'

Estadio El Campín
Bogotá, Colombia

September 11

Deportivo Italchacao (Venezuela)	2–0	(Mexico) Guadalajara
Leopoldo Jiménez 47'; Rafael Castellín '84.	report

Estadio Olímpico Univ. Central de Venezuela
Caracas, Venezuela

October 17

MetroStars (United States)	2–0 Awarded	(Mexico) Guadalajara

Giants Stadium
East Rutherford, United States

October 18

Deportivo Italchacao (Venezuela)	3–0	(Colombia) Millonarios
Félix Hernánex 3'; Fernando Martínez 65', 89'	report

Estadio Olímpico Univ. Central de Venezuela
Caracas, Venezuela

October 24

Deportivo Italchacao (Venezuela)	2–1	(United States) MetroStars
Daniel Diez 62', 88'	report	Carlos García 58' (o.g.)

Estadio Olímpico Univ. Central de Venezuela
Caracas, Venezuela

October 31

MetroStars (United States)	0–1	(Colombia) Millonarios
	report	Johan Viáfara 92+'

Giants Stadium
East Rutherford, United States

October 31

Guadalajara (Mexico)	0–2 Awarded	(Venezuela) Deportivo Italchacao

November 7

Millonarios (Colombia)	2–0 Awarded	(Mexico) Guadalajara

November 21

Guadalajara (Mexico)	0–2 Awarded	(United States) MetroStars

=== Group C ===
Pos	Team	Pld	W	D	L	GF	GA	GD	Pts	Qualification	(Mexico) SAN	(Peru) CRI	(United States) KAN	(Ecuador) BAR
1	(Mexico) Santos Laguna	6	5	0	1	15	6	+9	15	Advance to Semifinals	—	3–0	4–2	3–1
2	(Peru) Sporting Cristal	6	3	2	1	10	10	0	11		2–1	—	2–1	2–2
3	(United States) Kansas City Wizards	6	1	1	4	8	12	−4	4		0–1	1–2	—	1–1
4	(Ecuador) Barcelona	6	0	3	3	9	14	−5	3		1–3	2–2	2–3	—

Legend: Blue = home team win; Yellow = draw; Red = away team win.
August 1

Kansas City Wizards (United States)	1–2	(Peru) Sporting Cristal
Onandi Lowe 7'	report	Erick Torres 31'; Gastón Córdoba 79'

Arrowhead Stadium
Kansas City, United States

August 8

Santos Laguna (Mexico)	4–2	(United States) Kansas City Wizards
Héctor Altamirano 28' (pen.); Robson Luiz 36'; Eduardo Lillingston 83' (pen.); Carlos Augusto Gomes de Oliveira 84'	report	Matt McKeon 53'; Roy Lassiter 88'

Estadio Corona
Torreón, Mexico

August 14

Santos Laguna (Mexico)	3–1	(Ecuador) Barcelona
Jared Borgetti 20', 59'; Luis Ramón Romero 49'	report	Nicolás Asencio 56'

Estadio Corona
Torreón, Mexico

August 21

Barcelona (Ecuador)	2–2	(Peru) Sporting Cristal
Máximo Tenorio 3'; Moreno Carlos Alfaro 56'	report	Jean Ferrari 24'; Jorge Soto 76'

Estadio Monumental Isidro Romero
Guayaquil, Ecuador

August 29

Barcelona (Ecuador)	2–3	(United States) Kansas City Wizards
Carlos Alfaro Moreno 13'; Fricson George 76'	report	Roy Lassiter 31'; Chris Brown 46', 50'

Estadio Monumental Isidro Romero
Guayaquil, Ecuador

September 12

Sporting Cristal (Peru)	2–1	(United States) Kansas City Wizards
Luis Bonnet 23', 25'	report	Onandi Lowe 40'

Estadio San Martín
Lima, Peru

September 20

Santos Laguna (Mexico)	3–0	(Peru) Sporting Cristal
Carlos Augusto Gomes de Oliveira 17'; Rodrigo Ruiz 72'; Eduardo Lillingston 78'	report

Estadio Corona
Torreón, Mexico

October 10

Barcelona (Ecuador)	1–3	(Mexico) Santos Laguna
Carlos Alfaro Moreno 10'	report	Jared Borgetti 62', 64'; Eduardo Lillingston 89'

Estadio Monumental Isidro Romero
Guayaquil, Ecuador

October 17

Kansas City Wizards (United States)	1–1	(Ecuador) Barcelona
Roy Lassiter 32'	report	Clóvis Bento da Cruz 41'

Arrowhead Stadium
Kansas City, United States

October 23

Sporting Cristal (Peru)	2–1	(Mexico) Santos Laguna
Piero Alva 38', 59'	report	Johan Rodríguez 21'

Estadio San Martín
Lima, Peru

November 21

Kansas City Wizards (United States)	0–1	(Mexico) Santos Laguna
	report	Eduardo Lillingston 12'

Arrowhead Stadium
Kansas City, United States

November 22

Sporting Cristal (Peru)	2–2	(Ecuador) Barcelona
Gastón Córdoba 83'; Diego Martínez 92+'	report	Clóvis Bento da Cruz 44'; Carlos Alfaro Moreno 86'

Estadio San Martín
Lima, Peru

=== Group D ===
Pos	Team	Pld	W	D	L	GF	GA	GD	Pts	Qualification	(Ecuador) EME	(Colombia) ATL	(Peru) UNI	(Bolivia) BLO
1	(Ecuador) Emelec	6	3	3	0	8	1	+7	12	Advance to Semifinals	—	3–0	1–0	4–1
2	(Colombia) Atlético Nacional	6	3	1	2	7	5	+2	10		0–0	—	3–0	1–0
3	(Peru) Universitario	6	3	1	2	7	7	0	10		0–0	2–1	—	2–0
4	(Bolivia) Blooming	6	0	1	5	3	12	−9	1		0–0	0–2	2–3	—

Legend: Blue = home team win; Yellow = draw; Red = away team win.
August 9

Atlético Nacional (Colombia)	3–0	(Peru) Universitario
Juan David Restrepo 18'; Oscar Restrepo 78'; Néstor Fabián Salazar 85'	report

Medellín, Colombia

August 22

Blooming (Bolivia)	2–3	(Peru) Universitario
Walter Otta 33', 71'	report	Martín Vilallonga 44', 47'; Paolo Maldonado 57'

Santa Cruz, Bolivia

August 30

Blooming (Bolivia)	0–2	(Colombia) Atlético Nacional
	report	Gustavo Díaz 19'; Jorge Humberto Agudelo 45'

Santa Cruz, Bolivia

September 13

Universitario (Peru)	0–0	(Ecuador) Emelec
	report

Estadio Monumental
Lima, Peru

September 18

Atlético Nacional (Colombia)	0–0	(Ecuador) Emelec
	report

Medellín, Colombia

September 19

Universitario (Peru)	2–0	(Bolivia) Bloomin
Sergio Ibarra 22'; Martín Vilallonga 68'	report

Estadio Monumental
Lima, Peru

September 26

Emelec (Ecuador)	1–0	(Peru) Universitario
Walter Ayoví 3'	report

Guayaquil, Ecuador

October 10

Universitario (Peru)	2–1	(Colombia) Atlético Nacional
Luis Cordero 74'; Sergio Ibarra 90'	report	Diego Toro 55'

Estadio Monumental
Lima, Peru

October 10

Blooming (Bolivia)	0–0	(Ecuador) Emelec
	report

Santa Cruz, Bolivia

October 25

Atlético Nacional (Colombia)	1–0	(Bolivia) Blooming
José María Ocampo 48'	report

Medellín, Colombia

October 28

Emelec (Ecuador)	4–1	(Bolivia) Blooming
Cristian Adrián Gómez 2'; Luis Hebertson Moreira 13'; Juan Ignacio Triviño 20'; Rafael Manosalvas 50'	report	Diego Cabrera 15'

Guayaquil, Ecuador

November 20

Emelec (Ecuador)	3–0	(Colombia) Atlético Nacional
Otilino George Tenorio 29', 51'; Carlos Ramón Hidalgo 78'	report

Guayaquil, Ecuador

== Semifinals ==
The semifinals consisted of two games between the Necaxa (winner of Group A) and Millonarios (winner of Group B), and two games between the Santos Laguna (winner of Group C) and Emelec (winner of Group D). Both series were decided in penalty kicks because the net of both games was a draw.

Team 1	Agg.	Team 2	1st leg	2nd leg
Necaxa (Mexico)	5–5 (1–3 p)	(Colombia) Millonarios	3–2	2–3
Santos Laguna (Mexico)	5–5 (2–4 p)	(Ecuador) Emelec	4–1	1–4

November 20, 2001

Necaxa (Mexico)	3–2	(Colombia) Millonarios
Moreno 9'; Martínez 85'; Alves 89'	Report	Gutiérrez 25', 29'

Estadio Municipal, Aguascalientes, Mexico
Referee: Rogger Zambrano (Ecuador)

November 27, 2001

Millonarios (Colombia)	3–2	(Mexico) Necaxa
Orrego 38'; Rivera 64'; Jaramillo 85'	Report	López 21'; Moreno 28'
Penalties
Rivera (penalty scored); Castro (penalty scored); Moreno (penalty scored); Gutiérrez (penalty missed)	3–1	(penalty scored) González; (penalty missed) Pérez; (penalty missed) Núñez; (penalty missed) Galván

Estadio El Campín, Bogotá, Colombia
Referee: Luis Solorzano (Venezuela)

5–5 on aggregate, Millonarios won 3–1 on penalties

November 29, 2001

Santos Laguna (Mexico)	4–1	(Ecuador) Emelec
Robson Luiz 14', 33'; Lillingston 25'; Gómes 58'	Report	Tenorio 75'

Estadio Corona, Torreón, Mexico
Referee: José Arana (Peru)

December 6, 2001

Emelec (Ecuador)	4–1	(Mexico) Santos Laguna
Otilino Tenorio 5', 13'; Carlos Hidalgo 24'; Luis Moreira 44'	Report	Gómes 71'
Penalties
Carlos Hidalgo (penalty scored); Augusto Porozo (penalty scored); Otilino Tenorio (penalty scored); Walter Ayoví (penalty scored)	4–2	(penalty scored) Héctor Altamirano; (penalty scored) Gómes; (penalty missed) Robson Luiz; (penalty missed) Romero

Estadio George Capwell, Guayaquil, Ecuador
Referee: Guido Aros (Chile)

5–5 on aggregate, Emelec won 4–2 on penalties

== Finals ==
After tying both matches, Millonarios defeated Emelec in penalty kicks.

December 13, 2001
20:10 (UTC-5)

Millonarios (Colombia)	1–1	(Ecuador) Emelec
Carlos Castro 76'	Report	Otilino Tenorio 75'

Estadio Nemesio Camacho, Bogotá
Referee: Luis Solorzano (Venezuela)

December 20, 2001
19:10 (UTC-5)

Emelec (Ecuador)	1–1	(Colombia) Millonarios
Otilino Tenorio 50'	Report	Luis Eduardo Zapata 19'
Penalties
Carlos Hidalgo (penalty missed); Otilino Tenorio (penalty missed); Augusto Porozo (penalty scored); Jhon Cagua (penalty missed)	1-3	(penalty missed) Harold Rivera; (penalty scored) Alexander Orrego; (penalty scored) Carlos Castro; (penalty scored) Carlos Gutiérrez

Estadio George Capwell, Guayaquil
Referee: Gilberto Hidalgo (Peru)

== Statistics ==
=== Top scorers ===
Rank	Player	Team	Total
1	(Ecuador) Otilino Tenorio	(Ecuador) Emelec	7
2	(Argentina) Alfredo David Moreno	(Mexico) Necaxa	6
3	(Colombia) Wilson Cano	(Colombia) Millonarios	5
3	(Mexico) Eduardo Lillingston	(Mexico) Santos Laguna	5
5	(Mexico) Jared Borgetti	(Mexico) Santos Laguna	4
5	(Argentina) Carlos Alfaro Moreno	(Ecuador) Barcelona	4
5	(Mexico) Luis Roberto Alves	(Mexico) Necaxa	4
5	(Brazil) Carlos Augusto Gomes	(Mexico) Santos Laguna	4
9	(Brazil) Róbson Luís	(Mexico) Santos Laguna	3
9	(Paraguay) Raúl Duarte	(Ecuador) Aucas	3
9	(United States) Roy Lassiter	(United States) Kansas City Wizards	3
9	(Argentina) Martín Vilallonga	(Peru) Universitario	3
9	(Mexico) Luis Ernesto Pérez	(Mexico) Necaxa	3
