= 2001–02 Primera División A season =

Season of a Mexican football league

Primera División A
- Season: 2001–2002
- Champions: Invierno: Veracruz (1st Title); Verano: Real San Luis (1st title)
- Promoted: Real San Luis; Veracruz
- Relegated: Chapulineros de Oaxaca (won promotion playoff)
- Top goalscorer: Invierno: Héctor Carlos Álvarez (16); Verano: Ariel González (15)

Primera División A (Méxican First A Division) is a Mexican football tournament. This season was composed of Invieno 2001 and Verano 2002. Real San Luis was the winner of the promotion to First Division after winning Tiburones Rojos de Veracruz in the promotion playoff. However, Veracruz was also promoted to First Division after defeating Club León in a promotional series.

== Changes for the 2001–02 season ==
- Potros Marte was relocated to Acapulco and renamed Potros Guerrero.
- Yucatán was bought by new owners, they relocated the team to Querétaro and renamed Querétaro F.C.
- Real San Sebastián was relocated to Tuxtla Gutiérrez and renamed Atlético Chiapas.
- Lobos UAP was relocated to Oaxaca and renamed Chapulineros de Oaxaca.
- C.F. Monterrey and Tigres UANL exchanged their Primera A teams. Saltillo Soccer was moved to Ciudad Juárez and renamed Cobras Juárez and Tigres de Ciudad Juárez was moved to Saltillo and renamed Tigrillos Saltillo.
- Águilas de Tamaulipas was promoted from Second Division. However, before the season started, the team was renamed Tampico Madero F.C.
- Potros Zitácuaro was promoted from Second Division after winning a promotion playoff.

== Stadiums and locations ==
Location of teams in the 2001-2002 Primera División A

Club	Stadium	Capacity	City
Aguascalientes	Municipal de Aguascalientes	12,500	Aguascalientes, Aguascalientes
Atlético Chiapas	Víctor Manuel Reyna	25,000	Tuxtla Gutiérrez, Chiapas
Atlético Mexiquense	Nemesio Díez	35,000	Toluca, State of Mexico
Bachilleres	Jalisco	60,000	Guadalajara, Jalisco
Cobras Juárez	Olímpico Benito Juárez	22,000	Ciudad Juárez, Chihuahua
Correcaminos UAT	Marte R. Gómez	20,000	Ciudad Victoria, Tamaulipas
Cruz Azul Hidalgo	10 de Diciembre	17,000	Cruz Azul, Hidalgo
Durango	Francisco Zarco	15,000	Durango, Durango
Nacional Tijuana	Cerro Colorado	12,000	Tijuana, Baja California
Oaxaca	Benito Juárez	15,000	Oaxaca, Oaxaca
Potros Guerrero	Unidad Deportiva Acapulco	13,000	Acapulco, Guerrero
Querétaro	Corregidora	35,000	Querétaro, Querétaro
Real San Luis	Plan de San Luis/Alfonso Lastras Ramírez	18,000	San Luis Potosí, S.L.P.
RS Zacatecas	Francisco Villa	18,000	Zacatecas, Zacatecas
Tampico Madero	Tamaulipas	30,000	Tampico - Madero, Tamaulipas
Tigrillos	Francisco I. Madero	10,000	Saltillo, Coahuila
Toros Neza	Neza 86	20,000	Ciudad Nezahualcóyotl, State of Mexico
Veracruz	Luis "Pirata" Fuente	33,000	Veracruz, Veracruz
Zacatepec	Agustín Coruco Díaz	18,000	Zacatepec, Morelos
Zitácuaro	Ignacio López Rayón	10,000	Zitácuaro, Michoacán

== Invierno 2001 ==
=== Group league tables ===
==== Group 1 ====
Pos	Team	Pld	W	D	L	GF	GA	GD	Pts
1	Zacatepec	19	9	6	4	32	19	+13	33
2	Veracruz	19	8	6	5	25	19	+6	30
3	Nacional Tijuana	19	8	4	7	25	24	+1	28
4	Tigrillos	19	6	5	8	30	32	−2	23
5	Oaxaca	19	4	7	8	27	28	−1	19

Source: Ascenso MX
Rules for classification: Rules for classification: 1st points; 2nd goal difference; 3rd goals scored; 4th head-to-head; 5th away goals scored; 6th draw

==== Group 2 ====
Pos	Team	Pld	W	D	L	GF	GA	GD	Pts
1	Querétaro	19	11	4	4	33	25	+8	37
2	Cruz Azul Hidalgo	19	7	8	4	27	28	−1	29
3	Atlético Chiapas	19	7	5	7	28	28	0	26
4	Durango	19	6	6	7	29	29	0	24
5	Potros Guerrero	19	3	8	8	18	29	−11	17

Source: Ascenso MX
Rules for classification: Rules for classification: 1st points; 2nd goal difference; 3rd goals scored; 4th head-to-head; 5th away goals scored; 6th draw

==== Group 3 ====
Pos	Team	Pld	W	D	L	GF	GA	GD	Pts
1	Correcaminos UAT	19	11	2	6	31	25	+6	35
2	Atlético Mexiquense	19	7	6	6	24	24	0	27
3	Toros Neza	19	6	5	8	27	31	−4	23
4	Tampico Madero	19	5	4	10	24	30	−6	19
5	Cobras Juárez	19	3	6	10	17	31	−14	15

Source: Ascenso MX
Rules for classification: Rules for classification: 1st points; 2nd goal difference; 3rd goals scored; 4th head-to-head; 5th away goals scored; 6th draw

==== Group 4 ====
Pos	Team	Pld	W	D	L	GF	GA	GD	Pts
1	Aguascalientes	19	8	6	5	25	20	+5	30
2	Real San Luis	19	8	5	6	30	29	+1	29
3	RS Zacatecas	19	7	4	8	28	30	−2	25
4	Zitácuaro	19	6	7	6	18	23	−5	25
5	Bachilleres	19	4	8	7	31	27	+4	20

Source: Ascenso MX
Rules for classification: Rules for classification: 1st points; 2nd goal difference; 3rd goals scored; 4th head-to-head; 5th away goals scored; 6th draw

=== General league table ===
Pos	Team	Pld	W	D	L	GF	GA	GD	Pts
1	Querétaro	19	11	4	4	33	25	+8	37
2	Correcaminos UAT	19	11	2	6	31	25	+6	35
3	Zacatepec	19	9	6	4	32	19	+13	33
4	Veracruz	19	8	6	5	25	19	+6	30
5	Aguascalientes	19	8	6	5	25	20	+5	30
6	Real San Luis	19	8	5	6	30	29	+1	29
7	Cruz Azul Hidalgo	19	7	8	4	27	28	−1	29
8	Nacional Tijuana	19	8	4	7	25	24	+1	28
9	Atlético Mexiquense	19	7	6	6	24	24	0	27
10	Atlético Chiapas	19	7	5	7	28	28	0	26
11	RS Zacatecas	19	7	4	8	28	30	−2	25
12	Zitácuaro	19	6	7	6	18	23	−5	25
13	Durango	19	6	6	7	29	29	0	24
14	Tigrillos	19	6	5	8	30	32	−2	23
15	Toros Neza	19	6	5	8	27	31	−4	23
16	Bachilleres	19	4	8	7	31	27	+4	20
17	Oaxaca	19	4	7	8	27	28	−1	19
18	Tampico Madero	19	5	4	10	24	30	−6	19
19	Potros Guerrero	19	3	8	8	18	29	−11	17
20	Cobras Juárez	19	3	6	10	17	31	−14	15

Source: Ascenso MX
Rules for classification: 1st points; 2nd goal difference; 3rd goals scored; 4th head-to-head; 5th away goals scored; 6th draw

=== Results ===
Home \ Away	AGS	ACH	AMX	BAC	COB	CRH	DUR	NAT	OAX	PGR	QRO	RSL	RSZ	TAM	TGR	TOR	UAT	VER	ZAC	ZIT
Aguascalientes			2–0			0–2	4–0	2–1	3–1		1–4		3–1		1–1				1–1	
Atlético Chiapas	0–1		1–0			2–0	3–2		2–2				4–2		3–0	2–1			0–0	
At. Mexiquense				0–0	1–1		2–1	1–0		2–1	2–0	3–4	0–2				2–0	1–1		
Bachilleres	0–0	1–2			4–0	8–0			2–2	2–1				1–1	3–3	2–2				1–1
Cobras Juárez	0–1	2–2				1–1			1–0	1–1				3–1	2–0	1–2			0–3	2–2
Cruz Azul Hidalgo			1–1				2–0	2–0	3–2	1–0	1–1	1–1	3–2					1–1	0–0	
Durango				1–0	3–0			3–3			2–2	2–1	0–1				1–0	1–1		5–1
Nacional		1–1		1–1	1–0						3–0	2–1		1–0			3–1	1–0		1–0
Oaxaca			2–1				1–1	1–0		4–0	3–0	2–3	1–1				1–2	1–1	2–2	
Potros Guerrero	1–1	3–2					1–1	2–1			1–4		0–0	1–1	2–2	0–2		3–1		
Querétaro		1–0		2–1	0–0							2–1		2–1		3–0	2–1	2–5		3–0
Real San Luis	2–1	2–0		2–1	1–0					0–0				3–0	2–1	3–3	1–3			1–2
RS Zacatecas				3–2	4–1			1–2			2–3	2–0		1–1			2–1	0–0		0–1
Tampico Madero	0–1	5–2	0–2			1–1	1–0		2–0						1–2	0–1			3–2	
Tigrillos			5–2			1–3	1–3	2–2	2–1		0–0		5–1					0–1	3–2	
Toros Neza	2–2		1–2			2–1	2–2	3–1	1–0				1–2		1–2				1–1	
Correcaminos UAT	1–0	3–2		3–2	2–1	2–2				1–1				4–3	1–0	3–1				1–0
Veracruz	2–0	2–0		1–2	2–1							2–2		3–1		1–0	0–2			1–0
Zacatepec			2–2	2–0			3–1	3–1		2–0	1–2	3–0	2–1				1–0	1–0		
Zitácuaro	1–1	0–0	0–0			3–2			1–1	1–0				0–2	1–0	3–1			2–1	

Updated to match(es) played on 17 November 2001. Source: Ascenso MX
Legend: Blue = home team win; Yellow = draw; Red = away team win.

=== Reclassification series ===
Team 1	Agg.	Team 2	1st leg	2nd leg
Nacional Tijuana	3–3	Atlético Mexiquense	0–3	3–0

==== First leg ====
21 November 2001	Atlético Mexiquense	3–0	Nacional Tijuana	Toluca, State of Mexico
15:00	Osuna 27'; Aguirre 52'; Mora 54'	Report		Stadium: Estadio Nemesio Díez; Attendance: 1,000

==== Second leg ====
24 November 2001	Nacional Tijuana	3–0 (3–3 agg.)	Atlético Mexiquense	Tijuana, Baja California
13:00	Salcido 2'; Sabah 39'; Martínez 63' (o.g.)	Report		Stadium: Estadio Cerro Colorado; Attendance: 3,000

=== Liguilla ===
Quarter-finals
4	Veracruz (t.p.)	0	3	3
5	Aguascalientes	2	1	3
3	Zacatepec	0	1	1
7	Cruz Azul Hidalgo	1	1	2
2	Correcaminos UAT	1	0	1
8	Nacional (t.p.)	1	0	1
1	Querétaro	1	3	4
6	Real San Luis	3	2	5

Semi-finals
4	Veracruz (t.p.)	1	1	2
7	Cruz Azul Hidalgo	2	0	2
2	Correcaminos UAT	0	2	2
6	Real San Luis	2	1	3

Final
4	Veracruz	2	2	4
6	Real San Luis	2	0	2

- (t.p.) The team was classified by its best position in the general table

==== Quarter-finals ====
Team 1	Agg.	Team 2	1st leg	2nd leg
Veracruz	3–3	Aguascalientes	0–2	3–1
Zacatepec	1–2	Cruz Azul Hidalgo	0–1	1–1
Querétaro	4–5	Real San Luis	1–3	3–2
Correcaminos UAT	1–1	Nacional Tijuana	1–1	0–0

===== First leg =====
28 November 2001	Aguascalientes	2–0	Veracruz	Aguascalientes, Aguascalientes
20:00	Díaz 18'; Larrosa 69'	Report		Stadium: Estadio Municipal; Attendance: 8,000

28 November 2001	Real San Luis	3–1	Querétaro	San Luis Potosí, S.L.P.
20:45	de Faria 3', 39'; Santibáñez 60'	Report	Cartes 39'	Stadium: Estadio Plan de San Luis; Attendance: 8,000

29 November 2001	Cruz Azul Hidalgo	1–0	Zacatepec	Ciudad Cooperativa, Hidalgo
15:30	Incera 70'	Report		Stadium: Estadio 10 de Diciembre; Attendance: 4,000

29 November 2001	Nacional Tijuana	1–1	Correcaminos UAT	Tijuana, Baja California
19:30	Villaseñor 1'	Report	Rossello 23'	Stadium: Estadio Cerro Colorado; Attendance: 5,000

===== Second leg =====
1 December 2001	Veracruz	3–1 (3–3 agg.)	Aguascalientes	Veracruz, Veracruz
16:00	Medel 36'; Juárez 66'; Sánchez 69' o.g.	Report	Rico 23'	Stadium: Estadio Luis "Pirata" Fuente; Attendance: 10,000

1 December 2001	Querétaro	3–2 (4–5 agg.)	Real San Luis	Querétaro, Querétaro
20:00	Cartes 10', 32'; González 70'	Report	de Faria 12'; Olvera 76'	Stadium: Estadio Corregidora; Attendance: 30,000

2 December 2001	Correcaminos UAT	0–0 (1–1 agg.)	Nacional Tijuana	Ciudad Victoria, Tamaulipas
12:00		Report		Stadium: Estadio Marte R. Gómez; Attendance: 10,000

2 December 2001	Zacatepec	1–1 (1–2 agg.)	Cruz Azul Hidalgo	Zacatepec, Morelos
14:30	Torres 11'	Report	Cancela 85'	Stadium: Estadio Agustín Coruco Díaz; Attendance: 15,000

==== Semi-finals ====
Team 1	Agg.	Team 2	1st leg	2nd leg
Veracruz	2–2	Cruz Azul Hidalgo	1–2	1–0
Correcaminos UAT	2–3	Real San Luis	0–2	2–1

===== First leg =====
5 December 2001	Cruz Azul Hidalgo	2–1	Veracruz	Ciudad Cooperativa, Hidalgo
15:30	Aguilar 61'; Cancela 81'	Report	Gorsd 21'	Stadium: Estadio 10 de Diciembre; Attendance: 6,000

6 December 2001	Real San Luis	2–0	Correcaminos UAT	San Luis Potosí, S.L.P.
20:45	de Faria 6'; Santibáñez 69'	Report		Stadium: Estadio Plan de San Luis; Attendance: 20,000

===== Second leg =====
8 December 2001	Veracruz	1–0 (2–2 agg.)	Cruz Azul Hidalgo	Veracruz, Veracruz
16:00	Casartelli 16'	Report		Stadium: Estadio Luis "Pirata" Fuente; Attendance: 18,000

9 December 2001	Correcaminos UAT	2–1 (2–3 agg.)	Real San Luis	Ciudad Victoria, Tamaulipas
12:00	de Almeida 13'; Rossello 53'	Report	de Faria 69'	Stadium: Estadio Marte R. Gómez

==== Final ====
Team 1	Agg.	Team 2	1st leg	2nd leg
Veracruz	4–2	Real San Luis	2–2	2–0

===== First leg =====
12 December 2001	Real San Luis	2–2	Veracruz	San Luis Potosí, S.L.P.
20:45	García 23'; Flores 57'	Report	Mora 17'; Gordillo 60'	Stadium: Estadio Plan de San Luis; Attendance: 20,000

===== Second leg =====
15 December 2001	Veracruz	2–0 (4–2 agg.)	Real San Luis	Veracruz, Veracruz
16:00	Sánchez 3' o.g. Gordillo 47'	Report		Stadium: Estadio Luis "Pirata" Fuente; Attendance: 35,000

Invierno 2001 winners

1st title

=== Top scorers ===
Scorer	Goals	Team
(Argentina) Héctor Carlos Álvarez	16	Tampico Madero
(Uruguay) Héctor Giménez	13	Atlético Mexiquense
(Argentina) Ariel González	12	Querétaro
(Paraguay) Julio César Colman	12	RS Zacatecas
(Argentina) Pablo Bocco	11	Zacatepec

== Verano 2002 ==
=== Group league tables ===
==== Group 1 ====
Pos	Team	Pld	W	D	L	GF	GA	GD	Pts
1	Zacatepec	19	10	5	4	34	28	+6	35
2	Oaxaca	19	7	6	6	34	33	+1	27
3	Tigrillos	19	6	6	7	24	25	−1	24
4	Nacional Tijuana	19	5	7	7	17	23	−6	22
5	Veracruz	19	3	2	14	20	33	−13	11

Source: Ascenso MX
Rules for classification: 1st points; 2nd goal difference; 3rd goals scored; 4th head-to-head; 5th away goals scored; 6th draw

==== Group 2 ====
Pos	Team	Pld	W	D	L	GF	GA	GD	Pts
1	Atlético Chiapas	19	9	5	5	32	28	+4	32
2	Querétaro	19	8	6	5	31	23	+8	30
3	Cruz Azul Hidalgo	19	6	5	8	21	24	−3	23
4	Durango	19	5	8	6	32	40	−8	23
5	Potros Guerrero	19	5	5	9	25	35	−10	20

Source: Ascenso MX
Rules for classification: 1st points; 2nd goal difference; 3rd goals scored; 4th head-to-head; 5th away goals scored; 6th draw

==== Group 3 ====
Pos	Team	Pld	W	D	L	GF	GA	GD	Pts
1	Atlético Mexiquense	19	11	3	5	36	18	+18	36
2	Tampico Madero	19	10	3	6	34	29	+5	33
3	Toros Neza	19	7	7	5	28	25	+3	28
4	Correcaminos UAT	19	7	7	5	21	19	+2	28
5	Cobras Juárez	19	6	5	8	21	28	−7	23

Source: Ascenso MX
Rules for classification: 1st points; 2nd goal difference; 3rd goals scored; 4th head-to-head; 5th away goals scored; 6th draw

==== Group 4 ====
Pos	Team	Pld	W	D	L	GF	GA	GD	Pts
1	Real San Luis	19	9	3	7	33	24	+9	30
2	Aguascalientes	19	8	3	8	35	29	+6	27
3	Zitácuaro	19	8	3	8	28	30	−2	27
4	Bachilleres	19	7	4	8	24	26	−2	25
5	RS Zacatecas	19	4	5	10	22	32	−10	17

Source: Ascenso MX
Rules for classification: 1st points; 2nd goal difference; 3rd goals scored; 4th head-to-head; 5th away goals scored; 6th draw

=== General league table ===
Pos	Team	Pld	W	D	L	GF	GA	GD	Pts
1	Atlético Mexiquense	19	11	3	5	36	18	+18	36
2	Zacatepec	19	10	5	4	34	28	+6	35
3	Tampico Madero	19	10	3	6	34	29	+5	33
4	Atlético Chiapas	19	9	5	5	32	28	+4	32
5	Real San Luis	19	9	3	7	33	24	+9	30
6	Querétaro	19	8	6	5	31	23	+8	30
7	Toros Neza	19	7	7	5	28	25	+3	28
8	Correcaminos UAT	19	7	7	5	21	19	+2	28
9	Aguascalientes	19	8	3	8	35	29	+6	27
10	Oaxaca	19	7	6	6	34	33	+1	27
11	Zitácuaro	19	8	3	8	28	30	−2	27
12	Bachilleres	19	7	4	8	24	26	−2	25
13	Tigrillos	19	6	6	7	24	25	−1	24
14	Cruz Azul Hidalgo	19	6	5	8	21	24	−3	23
15	Cobras Juárez	19	6	5	8	21	28	−7	23
16	Durango	19	5	8	6	32	40	−8	23
17	Nacional Tijuana	19	5	7	7	17	23	−6	22
18	Potros Guerrero	19	5	5	9	25	35	−10	20
19	RS Zacatecas	19	4	5	10	22	32	−10	17
20	Veracruz	19	3	2	14	20	33	−13	11

Source: Ascenso MX
Rules for classification: 1st points; 2nd goal difference; 3rd goals scored; 4th head-to-head; 5th away goals scored; 6th draw

=== Results ===
Home \ Away	AGS	ACH	AMX	BAC	COB	CRH	DUR	NAT	OAX	PGR	QRO	RSL	RSZ	TAM	TGR	TOR	UAT	VER	ZAC	ZIT
Aguascalientes		5–2		3–2	2–0					4–1		2–1		2–0		0–2	3–0	1–0		2–1
Atlético Chiapas				2–0	3–0			3–1		1–1	0–2	1–0		1–0			3–2	0–3		3–0
At. Mexiquense	1–0	2–1				1–0			1–3					1–2	3–0	3–1			0–1	4–0
Bachilleres			2–1				2–1	0–0			1–2	2–2	3–1				0–1	1–0	2–1	
Cobras Juárez			2–2	1–2			1–1	1–0			2–1	1–0	2–1				1–1	2–1		
Cruz Azul Hidalgo	2–1	1–1		1–0	3–0									1–0	0–1	0–0	1–1			1–1
Durango	1–1	2–2	0–4			0–2			2–2	3–0				4–2	2–2	2–2			2–2	
Nacional	3–1		0–2			4–0	1–1		2–2	1–0			0–1		1–0	1–1			0–0	
Oaxaca	4–3	1–2		1–1	2–0	1–1								2–2	1–0	3–1				2–3
Potros Guerrero			0–2	3–1	1–0	2–1			1–1			1–2					3–3		2–2	3–0
Querétaro	1–1		1–1			3–1	1–2	1–1	2–1	1–1			2–0		1–0				0–1	
Real San Luis			2–1			2–0	6–0	3–0	4–1		2–2		3–1					1–0	1–1	
RS Zacatecas	3–3	1–1	0–2			3–1	4–5		4–2	2–0					0–0	1–1			0–1	
Tampico Madero				2–0	3–2			1–1		3–1	3–2	4–0	2–1				0–1	1–1		2–1
Tigrillos	3–1	2–2		1–3	1–1					3–1		2–1		2–3		1–1	1–1			0–1
Toros Neza		3–1		2–1	0–1					3–1	3–5	2–0		0–1			0–0	2–1		2–1
Correcaminos UAT			1–3				2–0	1–0	1–0		0–0	3–1	0–0					2–0	0–1	
Veracruz			2–2			1–4	2–3	0–1	2–3	2–3	2–1		1–0		1–2				1–2	
Zacatepec	2–1	2–3			3–2	2–1			1–2					6–3	0–3	2–2				4–3
Zitácuaro				1–1	2–2		2–1	5–0			1–2	0–2	2–0				2–1	2–0		

Updated to match(es) played on 20 April 2002. Source: Ascenso MX
Legend: Blue = home team win; Yellow = draw; Red = away team win.

=== Reclassification series ===
Team 1	Agg.	Team 2	1st leg	2nd leg
Toros Neza	3–5	Tigrillos	1–3	2–2

==== First leg ====
25 April 2002	Tigrillos	3–1	Toros Neza	San Nicolás de los Garza, Nuevo León
16:00	Ramírez 4'; García 39' de Nigris 50'	Report	Reyes 26'	Stadium: Estadio Universitario; Attendance: 4,000

==== Second leg ====
28 April 2002	Toros Neza	2–2 (3–5 agg.)	Tigrillos	Ciudad Nezahualcóyotl, State of Mexico
12:00	Arangio 27', 45'	Report	García 68'; Valtolrá 85'	Stadium: Estadio Neza 86; Attendance: 5,000

=== Liguilla ===
Quarter-finals
4	Atlético Chiapas	0	3	3
5	Real San Luis	3	1	4
2	Zacatepec	0	2	2
9	Aguascalientes	0	3	3
3	Tampico Madero	2	2	4
6	Querétaro	2	0	2
1	Atlético Mexiquense	0	1	1
13	Tigrillos	1	1	2

Semi-finals
5	Real San Luis	2	3	5
9	Aguascalientes	0	2	2
3	Tampico Madero	1	2	3
13	Tigrillos	4	1	5

Final
5	Real San Luis	1	4	5
13	Tigrillos	4	0	4

==== Quarter-finals ====
Team 1	Agg.	Team 2	1st leg	2nd leg
Atlético Chiapas	3–4	Real San Luis	0–3	3–1
Zacatepec	2–3	Aguascalientes	0–0	2–3
Tampico Madero	4–2	Querétaro	2–2	2–0
Atlético Mexiquense	1–2	Tigrillos	0–1	1–1

===== First leg =====
1 May 2002	Aguascalientes	0–0	Zacatepec	Zacatecas, Zacatecas
16:00		Report		Stadium: Estadio Francisco Villa; Attendance: 2,000

1 May 2002	Real San Luis	3–0	Atlético Chiapas	San Luis Potosí, San Luis Potosí
17:00	de Faria 14', 26'; Serrato 78'	Report		Stadium: Estadio Alfonso Lastras; Attendance: 20,000

1 May 2002	Querétaro	2–2	Tampico Madero	Querétaro, Querétaro
20:00	González 61'; López 76'	Report	Álvarez 32'; Morales 44'	Stadium: Estadio Corregidora; Attendance: 16,000

2 May 2002	Tigrillos	1–0	Atlético Mexiquense	San Nicolás de los Garza, Nuevo León
15:00	Azuara 27'	Report		Stadium: Estadio Universitario; Attendance: 5,000

===== Second leg =====
4 May 2002	Atlético Chiapas	3–1 (3–4 agg.)	Real San Luis	Tuxtla Gutiérrez, Chiapas
15:30	Córdova 33'; Rayas 61', 66'	Report	Olmedo 85'	Stadium: Estadio Víctor Manuel Reyna; Attendance: 2,000

4 May 2002	Zacatepec	2–3 (2–3 agg.)	Aguascalientes	Zacatepec, Morelos
16:00	Bocco 29', 81'	Report	Ramírez 9', 38', 49'	Stadium: Estadio Agustín Coruco Díaz; Attendance: 7,000

5 May 2002	Atlético Mexiquense	1–1 (1–2 agg.)	Tigrillos	Toluca, State of Mexico
12:00	Alfaro 90'	Report	Gomes 6'	Stadium: Estadio Nemesio Díez; Attendance: 500

5 May 2002	Tampico Madero	2–0 (4–2 agg.)	Querétaro	Tampico - Madero, Tamaulipas
15:00	Álvarez 62'; Pérez 80'	Report		Stadium: Estadio Tamaulipas; Attendance: 16,000

==== Semi-finals ====
Team 1	Agg.	Team 2	1st leg	2nd leg
Real San Luis	5–2	Aguascalientes	2–0	3–2
Tampico Madero	2–6	Tigrillos	1–4	1–2

===== First leg =====
9 May 2002	Tigrillos	4–1	Tampico Madero	San Nicolás de los Garza, Nuevo León
16:00	de Nigris 9'; Gomes 19'; Maciel 22'; Maldonado 90+2'	Report	Morales 8'	Stadium: Estadio Universitario; Attendance: 5,000

9 May 2002	Gallos de Aguascalientes	0–2	Real San Luis	Aguascalientes, Aguascalientes
16:00		Report	Infante 24' de Faria 44'	Stadium: Estadio Olímpico de Aguascalientes; Attendance: 5,000

===== Second leg =====
12 May 2002	Real San Luis	3–2 (5–2 agg.)	Aguascalientes	San Luis Potosí, San Luis Potosí
12:00	de Faria 39'; Infante 71'; Flores 76'	Report	Franco 16'; Espinoza 52'	Stadium: Estadio Alfonso Lastras; Attendance: 22,000

12 May 2002	Tampico Madero	1–2 (2–6 agg.)	Tigrillos	Tampico - Madero, Tamaulipas
15:00	Muñoz 72'	Report	García 35'; Oliva 38'	Stadium: Estadio Tamaulipas; Attendance: 20,000

==== Final ====
Team 1	Agg.	Team 2	1st leg	2nd leg
Real San Luis	5–4	Tigrillos	1–4	4–0

===== First leg =====
16 May 2002	Tigrillos	4–1	Real San Luis	San Nicolás de los Garza, Nuevo León
16:00	Álvarez 42'; Gomes 47'; Molina 60' de Nigris 81'	Report	García 45'	Stadium: Estadio Universitario; Attendance: 2,000

===== Second leg =====
19 May 2002	Real San Luis	4–0 (5–4 agg.)	Tigrillos	San Luis Potosí, San Luis Potosí
12:00	de Faria 22'; Serrato 55', 97'; Salcedo 89'	Report		Stadium: Estadio Alfonso Lastras; Attendance: 22,000

Verano 2002 winners

1st title

=== Top scorers ===
Scorer	Goals	Team
(Argentina) Ariel González	15	Querétaro
(Uruguay) Héctor Giménez	14	Atlético Mexiquense
(Mexico) Héctor Carlos Álvarez	13	Tampico Madero
(Uruguay) José Enrique García	12	Real San Luis
(Mexico) Juan Manuel Guerra	12	Oaxaca

== Relegation table ==
Pos.	Team	Pld.	Pts.	Ave.
16.	Cobras Juárez	114	139	1.2192
17.	Tigrillos	114	136	1.1929
18.	Bachilleres	114	136	1.1929
19.	Alacranes de Durango	114	135	1.1842
20.	Oaxaca	114	128	1.1228

== Campeón de Ascenso 2002 ==
The Promotion Final faced Real San Luis against Veracruz to determine the winner of the First Division Promotion. San Luis was the winner.

Team 1	Agg.	Team 2	1st leg	2nd leg
San Luis	4–2	Veracruz	1–1	3–1

=== First leg ===
23 May 2002	Veracruz	1–1	San Luis	Veracruz
16:00	Melillo 14'	Report	Santibáñez 54'	Stadium: Estadio Luis "Pirata" Fuente; Attendance: 16,000

=== Second leg ===
26 May 2002	San Luis	3–1 (4–2 agg.)	Veracruz	San Luis Potosí, San Luis Potosí
12:00	de Faria 12'; Mendoza 48'; García 88'	Report	Juárez 70'	Stadium: Estadio Alfonso Lastras; Attendance: 22,000

Champions

1st title

== First division promotion playoff ==
The Mexican Football Federation decided to increase the number of teams in the Primera División to 20 participants, so it was decided to play a promotion series between León, the last place in the Primera División relegation table, and Veracruz, Primera A season runner-up. Finally, Veracruz was the winner the team was promoted to Primera División. However, there was already a team in Veracruz, the owners decided to transfer the team promoted to Tuxtla Gutiérrez, where it was renamed as Jaguares de Chiapas.

Team 1	Agg.	Team 2	1st leg	2nd leg
León	1–3	Veracruz	1–3	0–0

=== First leg ===
29 May 2002	Veracruz	3–1	León	Veracruz, Veracruz
16:00	Casartelli 13', 44'; Juárez 61'	Report	Toledano 77'	Stadium: Estadio Luis "Pirata" Fuente; Attendance: 10,000

=== Second leg ===
1 June 2002	León	0–0 (1–3 agg.)	Veracruz.	León, Guanajuato
20:30		Report		Stadium: Estadio León; Attendance: 34,500

== Relegation playoff ==
A relegation series faced Chapulineros de Oaxaca, last team in the Primera A relegation table, against Astros de Ciudad Juárez, Second Division runner-up.

Team 1	Agg.	Team 2	1st leg	2nd leg
Oaxaca	6–4	Astros	2–4	4–0

=== First leg ===
15 May 2002	Astros	4–2	Oaxaca	Ciudad Juárez, Chihuahua
19:00	Moyeda 3', 61'; Gradito 50' de la Garza 79'	Report	Díaz 30'; Galeano 84'	Stadium: Estadio Corona Nuevo Milenio

=== Second leg ===
18 May 2002	Oaxaca	4–0 (6–2 agg.)	Astros	Oaxaca, Oaxaca
20:00	de la Torre 22'; Pacheco 39'; Juárez 65'; Guerra 70'	Report		Stadium: Estadio Benito Juárez
