= 1999 Liga Deportiva Universitaria de Quito season =

LDU Quito
1999 season
- President: Darío Ávila
- Manager: Manuel Pellegrini
- Stadium: Estadio Casa Blanca
- Serie A: Champions (6th title)
- Copa Libertadores: Round of 16
- Top goalscorer: League: Ezequiel Maggiolo (14 goals); All: Ezequiel Maggiolo (15 goals)
Home colours	Away colours

Liga Deportiva Universitaria de Quito's 1999 season was the club's 69th year of existence, the 46th year in professional football, and the 39th in the top level of professional football in Ecuador.

== Kits ==
Supplier: Umbro
Sponsor(s): La Lechera, Crunch, Ecuatoriana

== Squad ==
No.	Pos.	Nation	Player
—	GK	ECU	Jacinto Espinoza (captain)
—	GK	ECU	Víctor Sánchez
—	GK	ECU	Miguel Santillán
—	DF	ECU	Luis Capurro
—	DF	ECU	Mario Chillagana
—	DF	ECU	Geovanny Cumbicus
—	DF	ECU	Ulises de la Cruz
—	DF	ECU	Santiago Jácome
—	DF	ECU	Néicer Reasco
—	DF	ECU	Daniel Reinoso
—	DF	ECU	Byron Tenorio
—	MF	URU	Washington Aires
—	MF	ECU	Jorge Benalcázar
—	MF	ECU	Nixon Carcelén
—	MF	COL	Álex Escobar
—	MF	ECU	Hugo Garrido
—	MF	ECU	Luis González

No.	Pos.	Nation	Player
—	MF	ECU	Juan Guamán
—	MF	ECU	Paúl Guevara
—	MF	ECU	Camilo Hurtado
—	MF	ARG	Óscar Insaurralde
—	MF	ECU	Israel Jácome
—	MF	ECU	Líder Mejía
—	MF	ECU	Leorvelis Mina
—	MF	ECU	Alfonso Obregón
—	MF	CHI	Eladio Rojas
—	FW	PAR	Sergio Alcaráz
—	FW	ECU	Gustavo Figueroa
—	FW	ECU	Eduardo Hurtado
—	FW	ECU	Patricio Hurtado
—	FW	ARG	Ezequiel Maggiolo
—	FW	ECU	Jonathan Navarro
—	FW	COL	Ricardo Pérez

== Competitions ==
=== Serie A ===
==== First stage ====
Pos	Team	Pld	W	D	L	GF	GA	GD	Pts	Qualification
1	El Nacional	22	12	8	2	34	13	+21	44	Qualified to the Liguilla Final
2	Emelec	22	12	2	8	40	31	+9	38	Qualified to the Liguilla Final
3	LDU Quito	22	12	2	8	31	27	+4	38	Qualified to the Liguilla Final
4	Barcelona	22	10	5	7	25	24	+1	35	Qualified to the Liguilla Final
5	Macará	22	9	5	8	28	30	−2	32	

===== Results =====
Home \ Away	SDA	AO	BSC	DSC	CDC	SDQ	EN	CSE	CDE	LDU	MAC	CDO
Aucas										0–1		
Audaz Octubrino										0–1		
Barcelona										2–2		
Delfín										2–1		
Deportivo Cuenca										1–0		
Deportivo Quito										1–2		
El Nacional										4–0		
Emelec										2–1		
ESPOLI										0–1		
LDU Quito	2–1	2–1	3–2	4–0	1–0	1–0	0–3	3–1	0–2		1–2	3–0
Macará										1–1		
Olmedo										2–1		

Source: LDU 1999
Legend: Blue = home team win; Yellow = draw; Red = away team win.

==== Second stage ====
===== Group 2 =====
Group 2
Pos	Team	Pld	W	D	L	GF	GA	GD	Pts	Qualification
1	ESPOLI	10	7	1	2	15	11	+4	22	Qualified to the Liguilla Final
2	LDU Quito	10	5	2	3	12	8	+4	17	
3	Emelec	10	5	1	4	17	20	−3	16	
4	Olmedo	10	3	2	5	11	14	−3	11	
5	Aucas	10	2	3	5	11	9	+2	9	

====== Results ======
Home \ Away	SDA	CDC	CSE	CDE	LDU	CDO
Aucas					0–0	
Deportivo Cuenca					1–0	
Emelec					3–2	
ESPOLI					1–4	
LDU Quito	1–0	1–0	2–1	0–1		1–0
Olmedo					1–1	

Source: LDU 1999
Legend: Blue = home team win; Yellow = draw; Red = away team win.

==== Liguilla Final ====
Pos	Team	Pld	W	D	L	GF	GA	GD	Pts	Qualification
1	El Nacional	10	4	5	1	14	8	+6	20 (Note: Includes bonus points earned in previous stages: El Nacional (3); D. Quito, Emelec & ESPOLI (2); LDU Quito (1).)	Qualified to the Finals and the 2000 Copa Libertadores
2	LDU Quito	10	5	3	2	15	11	+4	19	Qualified to the Finals and the 2000 Copa Libertadores
3	Emelec	10	5	1	4	13	9	+4	18	Qualified to the 2000 Copa Libertadores
4	Deportivo Quito	10	3	3	4	16	20	−4	14	
5	ESPOLI	10	2	3	5	11	15	−4	11	
6	Barcelona	10	2	3	5	13	19	−6	9	

===== Results =====
Home \ Away	BSC	SDQ	EN	CSE	CDE	LDU
Barcelona						2–2
Deportivo Quito						2–3
El Nacional						2–0
Emelec						0–1
ESPOLI						0–0
LDU Quito	1–1	3–1	0–1	2–0	3–2	

Source: LDU 1999
Legend: Blue = home team win; Yellow = draw; Red = away team win.

==== Finals ====
Pos	Team	Pld	W	D	L	GF	GA	GD	Pts	Result
1	LDU Quito	2	2	0	0	4	1	+3	6	Champions (6th title)
2	El Nacional	2	0	0	2	1	4	−3	0	

===== Results =====
Home \ Away	EN	LDU
El Nacional		1–3
LDU Quito	1–0	

Source: LDU 1999
Legend: Blue = home team win; Yellow = draw; Red = away team win.

December 12	LDU Quito	1–0	El Nacional	Quito
11:30 UTC−05:00	Hurtado 65'			Stadium: Estadio Casa Blanca; Referee: Luis Vasco

December 19	El Nacional	1–3	LDU Quito	Quito
12:00 UTC−05:00	Alvarado 46'		Hurtado 36', 61'; Maggiolo 89'	Stadium: Estadio Olímpico Atahualpa; Referee: Byron Moreno

=== Copa Libertadores ===
==== Copa Libertadores squad ====
No.	Pos.	Nation	Player
1	GK	ECU	Jacinto Espinoza (captain)
2	DF	ECU	Byron Tenorio
3	DF	ECU	Santiago Jácome
4	DF	ECU	Ulises de la Cruz
5	MF	ECU	Alfonso Obregón
6	MF	ECU	Juan Guamán
7	FW	COL	Ricardo Pérez
8	MF	ECU	Nixon Carcelén
9	FW	ECU	Patricio Hurtado
10	MF	COL	Alex Escobar
11	FW	ARG	Ezequiel Maggiolo
12	GK	ECU	Víctor Sánchez

No.	Pos.	Nation	Player
13	DF	ECU	Néicer Reasco
14	DF	ECU	Luis Capurro
15	MF	ECU	Luis González
16	MF	CHI	Eladio Rojas
17	DF	ECU	Mario Chillagana
18	DF	ECU	Daniel Reinoso
19	FW	ECU	Patricio Vargas
20	MF	ECU	Jorge Benalcázar
21	MF	ECU	Paúl Guevara
24	MF	ECU	Leorvelis Mina
25	MF	ECU	Líder Mejía

Overall								Home						Away					
Pld	W	D	L	GF	GA	GD	Pts	W	D	L	GF	GA	GD	W	D	L	GF	GA	GD
8	4	1	3	11	9	+2	13	4	0	0	9	2	+7	0	1	3	2	7	−5

==== First stage ====
Pos	Team	Pld	W	D	L	GF	GA	GD	Pts	Qualification
1	(Ecuador) LDU Quito	6	3	1	2	10	8	+2	10	Round of 16
2	(Ecuador) Emelec	6	3	0	3	9	12	−3	9	Round of 16
3	(Bolivia) Jorge Wilstermann	6	2	2	2	9	9	0	8	Round of 16
4	(Bolivia) Blooming	6	2	1	3	5	4	+1	7	

February 21 First Stage	LDU Quito (Ecuador)	4–1	(Ecuador) Emelec	Quito, Ecuador
11:35 UTC−05:00	Pérez 19', 37'; Maggiolo 72'; Reasco 78'	Report	Fernández 84'	Stadium: Estadio Casa Blanca; Referee: Segundo Díaz (Ecuador)

March 5 First Stage	LDU Quito (Ecuador)	3–1	(Bolivia) Jorge Wilstermann	Quito, Ecuador
19:15 UTC−05:00	Pérez 32'; Rojas 39' de la Cruz 90'	Report	Reinoso 70'	Stadium: Estadio Casa Blanca; Referee: John Toro Rendón (Colombia)

March 12 First Stage	LDU Quito (Ecuador)	1–0	(Bolivia) Blooming	Quito, Ecuador
19:10 UTC−05:00	de la Cruz 57'	Report		Stadium: Estadio Casa Blanca; Referee: Luis Solórzano (Venezuela)

March 17 First Stage	Emelec (Ecuador)	2–0	(Ecuador) LDU Quito	Guayaquil, Ecuador
20:00 UTC−05:00	Juárez 60', 72'	Report		Stadium: Estadio George Capwell; Referee: José Carpio (Ecuador)

April 6 First Stage	Jorge Wilstermann (Bolivia)	1–1	(Ecuador) LDU Quito	Cochabamba, Bolivia
20:00 UTC−04:00	Sergio João 16'	Report	Pérez 80'	Stadium: Estadio Félix Capriles; Referee: Rubén Selman (Chile)

April 9 First Stage	Blooming (Bolivia)	3–1	(Ecuador) LDU Quito	Santa Cruz de la Sierra, Bolivia
21:00 UTC−04:00	Menacho 47'; Gutiérrez 61'; Antelo 71'	Report	Pérez 77'	Stadium: Estadio Ramón Tahuichi Aguilera; Referee: Guido Aros (Chile)

==== Round of 16 ====
April 14 Round of 16	River Plate (Argentina)	1–0	(Ecuador) LDU Quito	Buenos Aires, Argentina
21:10 UTC−03:00	Netto 8' (pen.)	Report		Stadium: Estadio Monumental Antonio Vespucio Liberti; Referee: Mario Sánchez Yantén (Chile)

April 21 Round of 16	LDU Quito (Ecuador)	1–0 (4–5 p)	(Argentina) River Plate	Quito, Ecuador
19:15 UTC−05:00	Capurro 87'	Report		Stadium: Estadio Casa Blanca; Referee: José Luis da Rosa (Uruguay)
	Penalties
	Pérez (penalty scored) de la Cruz (penalty scored); P. Hurtado (penalty scored); Mejía (penalty scored); Escobar (penalty missed)		(penalty scored) Netto; (penalty scored) Ramos; (penalty scored) Gancedo; (penalty scored) Berizzo; (penalty scored) Astrada

River Plate and LDU Quito were tied on points and goal difference. River Plate advanced on penalty kicks.
