= Mauricio Romero =

Mauricio Romero may refer to:

- Mauricio Romero (Colombian footballer) (born 1979), Colombian football midfielder
- Mauricio Romero (Argentine footballer) (born 1983), Argentine football defender
- Mauricio Romero (Mexican footballer) (born 1983), Mexican football forward
