= Hugo Castillo =

Hugo Castillo may refer to:

- Hugo Castillo (Argentine footballer) (born 1971), Argentine football forward
- Hugo Castillo (Peruvian footballer) (born 1978), Peruvian football defensive midfielder
