= Carlos Hidalgo =

Carlos Hidalgo may refer to:

- Carlos Hidalgo (footballer, born 1979), Ecuadorian football midfielder
- Carlos Hidalgo (footballer, born 1986), Colombian football striker
