= Marcelo Lipatín =

Uruguayan footballer (born 1977)

Marcelo Lipatin
Personal information
- Full name: Marcelo Lipatín López
- Date of birth: 28 January 1977 (age 49)
- Place of birth: Montevideo, Uruguay
- Height: 1.81 m (5 ft 11 1/2 in)
- Position: Forward

Youth career
- 1996-98: Paris Saint-Germain B

Senior career*
Years	Team	Apps	(Gls)
1998	Wanderers	9	(4)
1998–1999	Defensor Sporting	29	(5)
2000	Coritiba	15	(7)
2000–2001	PAS Giannina	9	(1)
2001	Yokohama F. Marinos	1	(0)
2001	Defensor Sporting	5	(1)
2002–2003	Club América	45	(14)
2003–2005	AS Bari	42	(2)
2005–2006	Grêmio	9	(2)
2006–2007	C.S. Marítimo	26	(7)
2007–2008	CD Nacional	26	(6)
2008–2009	Trofense	13	(1)
2010	Corinthians Paranaense	0	(0)
- * Club domestic league appearances and goals as of end of 2010 season

Marcelo Lipatín López (born January 28, 1977) is a Uruguayan professional football (soccer) player.

== Playing career ==
In July 2008, Lipatin was offered a contract from Maccabi Tel Aviv after they discovered that Lipatin's father is Jewish and his mother converted to Judaism. This would allow him to play in Israel and not count as a foreigner.

After his negotiations with Maccabi failed, he was offered to city rivals Hapoel Tel Aviv.

== Club statistics ==
Appearances and goals by club, season and competition
Club	Season	League	League		Regional League		Cup		Continental		Total	
Club	Season	League	Apps	Goals	Apps	Goals	Apps	Goals	Apps	Goals	Apps	Goals
Montevideo Wanderers	1998	Primera División	9	4	—		—		—		9	4
Defensor Sporting	1999	Primera División	26	5	—		—		—		26	5
Coritiba	2000	Série A	15	7	—		3	1	—		18	8
PAS Giannina	2000/01	Alpha Ethniki	9	1	—		2	0	—		11	1
Yokohama F. Marinos	2001	J1 League	1	0	—		—		—		1	0
Defensor Sporting	2001	Primera División	5	1	—		—		—		5	1
América	2002	Primera División	14	3	—		—		7	2	21	5
América	2002/03	Primera División	31	11	—		—		6	4	37	15
Bari	2003/04	Serie B	32	2	—		1	0	—		33	2
Bari	2004/05	Serie B	10	0	—		1	1	—		11	1
Grêmio	2005	Série B	9	2	—		—		—		9	2
Grêmio	2006	Série A	—		9	1	1	0	—		10	1
Marítimo	2006/07	Portuguese Liga	26	7	—		1	0	—		27	7
Nacional	2007/08	Portuguese Liga	26	6	—		2	3	—		28	9
Trofense	2008/09	Portuguese Liga	13	1	—		5	0	—		18	1
Corinthians Paranaense	2010	Série D	—		—		1	1	—		1	1
Country	Uruguay		40	10	—		—		—		40	10
Country	Brazil		24	9	9	1	5	2	—		38	12
Country	Greece		9	1	—		2	0	—		11	1
Country	Japan		1	0	—		—		—		1	0
Country	Mexico		45	14	—		—		13	6	58	20
Country	Italy		42	2	—		2	1	—		44	3
Country	Portugal		65	14	—		8	3	—		73	17
Total			217	53	9	1	17	6	13	6	256	66

== Honours ==
Yokohama F. Marinos

- J.League Cup: 2001

América

- Primera División: Verano 2002

Grêmio

- Série B: 2005
- Campeonato Gaúcho: 2006
