= List of América de Cali presidents =

Since its founding the club has had 33 presidents, 10 presidents in the amateur era of the team, from 1927 to 1947 and 23 presidents in the professional era, from 1948 to the present; besides a commission formed by the coach and the players.

== History ==
The first president who had America de Cali after its foundation was Hernán Zamorano Isaacs. According to Hernán, "the end of 1926 ran when, with my two friends Serafín Fernández and Alvaro Cruz, we decided to create a" team. "Serafin was the only one who had access to cash since he managed the box of his father's the coins that we managed to "collect" we bought once a fortnight an Argentine sports publication called "El Gráfico." In one of those magazines told the exploits of a team called Racing Club then with Serafin and Alvaro we decided to buy a ball and started playing In a field of the Central Cemetery under the name of Racing, the T-shirts, obviously made with fabrics donated by Serafin, were white with celestial sticks such as those of that Argentine team ". On February 16, 1948, Humberto Salcedo Fernández "Salcefer" and Dr. Manuel Correa Valencia, constitute the America in the first professional soccer championship in the country. "Salcefer" receives the appointment as first president in the professional era of the team and later it would become the first of the Dimayor.

The team began an odyssey of difficult times when it was included in the Clinton List in 1996 under the command of Carlos Puente González. In 2011, America suffers another serious event when it falls in the second division, time when Carlos H. Andrade becomes the new president of the institution, after bad campaigns of the previous directives; It was not until 2013, when Oreste Sangiovanni took the reins of the team in his attempt to not disappear and after 4 years of failed efforts aimed at restructuring for further sanitation, the new América S.A. organization was created.

Since May 10, 2016, Tulio Gómez became the new president and largest shareholder of América de Cali with 53 percent of the shares, after the era of Oreste Sangiovanni was concluded. Under his mandate, on November 27, 2016, Gómez became one of the architect men in the rise of América de Cali to the first division of Colombian football, after 5 years of remaining in second division.

On May 16, 2018, Tulio Gómez announced his retirement as President of the institution after bad management and an irregular campaign in the 2018 Liga Águila, although declared that it would continue being the owner of the team.

On May 30, 2018, Ricardo Pérez was announced as the new executive president of the America. The "Gato" Pérez would return to the team, after acting as a player between 1994 - 1996 and 1998. After a year of presiding as president of the América and reaching the 14th title in his administration, Ricardo Pérez said goodbye to the presidency on December 16, 2019 obeying "personal reasons".

Currently, the president of the America is the Colombian former player Mauricio Romero. He's assumed the presidency on December 18, 2019, after Ricardo Pérez left the team. Romero was linked to America de Cali as a player, where he managed to reach the Colombian championship in 2000, 2001 and the 2002 torneo apertura, in addition to the 1999 Copa Merconorte.

== List ==
List of all América de Cali presidents in history:

Amateur

Tenure	President
1927 - 1930	Hernán Zamorano Isaacs
1931 - 1934	Luis Carlos Cárdenas
1935 - 1937	Hernando Lenis
1938 - 1939	Rafael Martínez
1940	Guillermo Sandoval
1941	Carlos Alberto Suárez
1942 - 1943	Alfonso Fernández
1944	Jesús Flórez
1945 - 1947	Luis E. Valdez
1947	Guillermo Sardi Zamorano

Professional

Tenure	President
1948	Humberto Salcedo Fernández
1949	Manuel Correa Valencia
1950	Luis Carlos Cárdenas
1950 - 1955	Manuel Correa Valencia
1956 - 1960	Pedro Sellarés
1961	Gustavo Valdez
1965	Jorge Rengifo
1966	Gonzalo Zambrano
1967 - 1973	Alberto Anzola
1974 - 1975	Juan de Dios Guerrero
1976 - 1978	Ricardo León Ocampo
1979 - 1986	José "Pepino" Sangiovanni
1987 - 1991	Juan José Bellini
1992	Oreste Sangiovanni
1992 - 1994	Pedro Chang
1995 - 1996	Álvaro Muñoz Castro
1996 - 2009	Carlos Puente González
2009 - 2011	Álvaro Guerrero Yanci
2011 - 2012	Carlos H. Andrade
2012 - 2016	Oreste Sangiovanni
2016 - 2018	Tulio Gómez
2018 - 2019	Ricardo Pérez
2019 - 2023	Mauricio Romero
2024 - currently	Marcela Gómez
