= 1999 Campeonato Ecuatoriano de Fútbol Serie A =

Annual soccer tournament

Serie A
- Season: 1999
- Champions: LDU Quito (6th title)
- Relegated: Audaz Octubrino; Delfín; Deportivo Cuenca
- Top goalscorer: Christian Botero (25 goals)

The 1999 Campeonato Ecuatoriano de Fútbol de la Serie A was the 41st season of the Serie A, the top level of professional football in Ecuador. LDU Quito successfully defended their title and won their sixth national championship.

== First stage ==
Pos	Team	Pld	W	D	L	GF	GA	GD	Pts	Qualification
1	El Nacional	22	12	8	2	34	13	+21	44	Qualified to the Liguilla Final
2	Emelec	22	12	2	8	40	31	+9	38	Qualified to the Liguilla Final
3	LDU Quito	22	12	2	8	31	27	+4	38	Qualified to the Liguilla Final
4	Barcelona	22	10	5	7	25	24	+1	35	Qualified to the Liguilla Final
5	Macará	22	9	5	8	28	30	−2	32	
6	Olmedo	22	7	10	5	28	29	−1	31	
7	ESPOLI	22	9	3	10	38	29	+9	30	
8	Delfín	22	8	5	9	28	35	−7	29	
9	Deportivo Quito	22	7	6	9	32	29	+3	27	Qualified to the Relegation Liguilla
10	Deportivo Cuenca	22	7	6	9	25	33	−8	27	Qualified to the Relegation Liguilla
11	Aucas	22	6	4	12	26	32	−6	22	Qualified to the Relegation Liguilla
12	Audaz Octubrino	22	4	2	16	15	38	−23	14	Qualified to the Relegation Liguilla

== Second stage ==
Group 1
Pos	Team	Pld	W	D	L	GF	GA	GD	Pts	Qualification
1	Deportivo Quito	10	6	1	3	19	9	+10	19	Qualified to the Liguilla Final
2	Macará	10	5	0	5	15	16	−1	15	
3	Audaz Octubrino	10	5	0	5	13	17	−4	15	
4	El Nacional	10	4	2	4	18	15	+3	14	
5	Barcelona	10	4	1	5	13	14	−1	13	
6	Delfín	10	4	0	6	13	20	−7	12	Qualified to the Relegation Liguilla

Group 2
Pos	Team	Pld	W	D	L	GF	GA	GD	Pts	Qualification
1	ESPOLI	10	7	1	2	15	11	+4	22	Qualified to the Liguilla Final
2	LDU Quito	10	5	2	3	12	8	+4	17	
3	Emelec	10	5	1	4	17	20	−3	16	
4	Olmedo	10	3	2	5	11	14	−3	11	
5	Aucas	10	2	3	5	11	9	+2	9	
6	Deportivo Cuenca	10	2	3	5	8	12	−4	9	Qualified to the Relegation Liguilla

== Relegation Liguilla ==
Pos	Team	Pld	W	D	L	GF	GA	GD	Pts	Relegation
1	Aucas	10	6	3	1	20	12	+8	19	
2	Macará	10	4	4	2	19	15	+4	16	
3	Olmedo	10	4	3	3	13	8	+5	15	
4	Delfín	10	5	1	4	23	11	+12	14	Relegated to the Serie B
5	Cuenca	10	4	2	4	10	14	−4	11	Relegated to the Serie B
6	Audaz Octubrino	10	0	1	9	4	29	−25	−2	Relegated to the Serie B

== Liguilla Final ==
Pos	Team	Pld	W	D	L	GF	GA	GD	Pts	Qualification
1	El Nacional	10	4	5	1	14	8	+6	20 (Note: Includes bonus points earned in previous stages: El Nacional (3); D. Quito, Emelec & ESPOLI (2); LDU Quito (1).)	Qualified to the Finals and the 2000 Copa Libertadores
2	LDU Quito	10	5	3	2	15	11	+4	19	Qualified to the Finals and the 2000 Copa Libertadores
3	Emelec	10	5	1	4	13	9	+4	18	Qualified to the 2000 Copa Libertadores
4	Deportivo Quito	10	3	3	4	16	20	−4	14	
5	ESPOLI	10	2	3	5	11	15	−4	11	
6	Barcelona	10	2	3	5	13	19	−6	9	

== Championship finals ==
December 12, 1999

LDU Quito	1–0	El Nacional
E. Hurtado ?'

Estadio de Liga Deportiva Universitaria, Quito

December 19, 1999

El Nacional	1–3	LDU Quito

Estadio Olímpico Atahualpa, Quito

1999 Serie A champion
LDU Quito
6th title
