= Roberto Cartes =

Chilean footballer (born 1972)

Personal information
- Full name: Roberto Rodrigo Cartes Contreras
- Date of birth: 6 September 1972 (age 54)
- Place of birth: Concepción, Chile
- Height: 1.68 m (5 ft 6 in)
- Position: Defensive midfielder

Youth career
- 1986–1991: Huachipato

Senior career*
Years	Team	Apps	(Gls)
1992–1998	Huachipato	145	(2)
1998–1999	Argentinos Juniors	32	(2)
1999–2000	Gimnasia de Jujuy	34	(1)
2000–2002	Querétaro	24	(3)
2002–2004	San Luis	45	(2)
2005	Atlético Celaya	40	(4)
2005	Tigres B	18	(1)
2006	Águilas Riviera Maya	11	(0)
2006–2007	Zacatepec	18	(1)
2007–2009	Tampico Madero	42	(3)
2008	→ Huachipato (loan)	11	(0)
2009	Albinegros de Orizaba	8	(0)
2010	Lota Schwager	24	(1)
Total		452	(20)

International career
1998	Chile B	1	(0)
1999	Chile	7	(1)
- * Club domestic league appearances and goals

Roberto Rodrigo Cartes Contreras (born 6 September 1972) is a former Chilean footballer that his last club was Lota Schwager of Coronel that played in the Primera B during that moment.

== International career ==
Fuentes made 7 appearances for Chile in 1999. In addition, he played for Chile B against England B on February 10, 1998. Chile won by 2-1.
