= Ángel Sosa =

Mexican footballer (born 1976)

Personal information
- Full name: Ángel Raúl Sosa Hernández
- Date of birth: 26 January 1976 (age 50)
- Place of birth: Mexico City, Mexico
- Height: 1.86 m (6 ft 1 in)
- Position: Striker

Senior career*
Years	Team	Apps	(Gls)
1996	Toros Neza	1	(0)
2001–2003	Necaxa	83	(17)
2004	San Luis	16	(1)
2004–2006	Lobos		
2007–2010	Correcaminos		
2010	Veracruz		
- * Club domestic league appearances and goals as of 1 February 2008

Ángel Raúl Sosa Hernández (born 26 January 1976) is a Mexican former footballer. He is a nephew of singer José José.

Born in Mexico City, Sosa began playing youth football with local sides Pumas UNAM and Cruz Azul. In 1996, manager Enrique Meza brought Sosa to Toros Neza where he would make his professional debut. Sosa played professional football for 10 seasons, including a successful season with Club Necaxa in the Primera Division. Sosa also briefly played in Major League Soccer with Colorado Rapids.
