= Tulio Gómez =

Colombian businessman

21st President of América de Cali
- In office 10 May 2016 – 16 May 2018
- Preceded by: Oreste Sangiovanni
- Succeeded by: Ricardo Pérez

Personal details
- Born: Tulio Alberto Gómez Giraldo Manizales, Caldas, Colombia
- Profession: Businessperson

Tulio Alberto Gómez Giraldo (Manizales, Colombia), is a Colombian businessman. He was the founder and owner of supermarket chain Superinter. He was also the 21st president of Colombian football club América de Cali of which he is currently its biggest shareholder.

== Career ==
He founded the supermarket chain Supeinter in Cali in 1990.

In 2014, he bought a few shares in America de Cali, taking his wife's advice. Realizing that he did not have many rights, he bought more and kept 53% of the shares of the club that allowed him to make all the decisions. On 10 May 2016, he became the Chairman of America de Cali.

On 27 November 2016, Tulio Gómez was one of the architects in the rise of América de Cali to the Categoría Primera A of Colombian football, together with the team's coach that year Hernán Torres.

On 16 May 2018, Tulio Gómez announced his retirement as President after an irregular campaign in the 2018 Liga Águila. He declared that he would continue as the team owner.
