= 1999 in Ecuadorian football =

Football in Ecuador
- Season: 1999

The 1999 season is the 77th season of competitive football in Ecuador.

== National leagues ==
=== Serie A ===
- Champion: LDU Quito (6th title)
- International cup qualifiers:
  - 2000 Copa Libertadores: LDU Quito, El Nacional, Emelec
- Relegated: Delfín, Deportivo Cuenca, Audaz Octubrino

=== Serie B ===
- Winner: Técnico Universitario (3rd title)
- Promoted: Técnico Universitario
- Relegated: Deportivo Quinindé

=== Segunda ===
- Winner: Deportivo Saquisilí
- Promoted: Deportivo Saquisilí

== Clubs in international competitions ==
Team	1999 Copa Libertadores	1999 Copa Merconorte	1999 Copa CONMEBOL
Barcelona	N/A	Eliminated in the group stage	N/A
Deportivo Cuenca	N/A	N/A	Eliminated in the Round of 16
El Nacional	N/A	Eliminated in the group stage	N/A
Emelec	Eliminated in the Round of 16	Eliminated in the group stage	N/A
LDU Quito	Eliminated in the Round of 16	N/A	N/A

== National teams ==
=== Senior team ===
The Ecuador national team played in seventeen matches in 1999: three Copa América matches and 14 friendlies.

==== Copa América ====
Ecuador was drawn into Group C with Argentina, Colombia, and Uruguay. They lost all their matches and were eliminated in the group stage.

Team	Pld	W	D	L	GF	GA	GD	Pts
Colombia	3	3	0	0	6	1	+5	9
Argentina	3	2	0	1	5	4	+1	6
Uruguay	3	1	0	2	2	4	−2	3
Ecuador	3	0	0	3	3	7	−4	0

1 July 1999
21:05

Argentina	3 – 1	Ecuador
Simeone 12'; Palermo 55', 61'	Report	Kaviedes 77'

Estadio Feliciano Cáceres, Luque
Referee: Gilberto Hidalgo (Peru)

4 July 1999
15:05

Uruguay	3 – 1	Ecuador
Zalayeta 72', 74'	Report	Kaviedes 78'

Estadio Feliciano Cáceres, Luque
Referee: Mario Sánchez (Chile)

7 July 1999
19:05

Colombia	2 – 1	Ecuador
Morantes 37'; Ricard 39'	Report	Graziani 50'

Estadio Feliciano Cáceres, Luque
Referee: Masayoshi Okada (Japan)

==== Friendlies ====
27 January 1999

Costa Rica	0 – 0	Ecuador

Estadio Alejandro Morera Soto, Alajuela
Attendance: 15,000
Referee: Ronald Cedeño (Costa Rica)

31 January 1999

Ecuador	1 – 1	Denmark
E. Hurtado 73'		Daugaard 89'

Estadio Modelo, Guayaquil
Attendance: 10,000
Referee: José Carpio (Ecuador)

3 February 1999

Guatemala	0 – 0	Ecuador

Estadio Mateo Flores, Guatemala City
Attendance: 10,000
Referee: Hugo Castillo (Guatemala)

10 February 1999

Peru	1 – 2	Ecuador
Mendoza 39'		E. Hurtado 66', 75'

Estadio Nacional, Lima
Attendance: 10,000
Referee: Ángel Ziani (Peru)

17 February 1999

Ecuador	1 – 2	Peru
Chalá 68'		Pizarro 28'; Mendoza 48'

Estadio Monumental, Guayaquil
Attendance: 15,000
Referee: Roger Zambrano (Ecuador)

14 April 1999

Mexico	0 – 0	Ecuador

Estadio Universitario, Monterrey
Attendance: 25,000
Referee: Kevin Stott (United States)

19 May 1999

Ecuador	0 – 2	Venezuela
		Urdaneta 8', 56'

Estadio Reales Tamarindos, Portoviejo
Attendance: 26,000
Referee: Byron Moreno (Ecuador)

15 June 1999

Venezuela	3 – 2	Ecuador
Rey 50'; García 90'; Morán 90+2'		Montaño 15'; Delgado 22'

Estadio Pueblo Nuevo, San Cristóbal
Attendance: 9,000
Referee: Edison Ibarra (Ecuador)

22 June 1999

Chile	0 – 0	Ecuador

Estadio Nacional de Chile, Santiago
Attendance: 23,282
Referee: Daniel Giménez (Argentina)

12 October 1999

Uruguay	0 – 0	Ecuador

Estadio Centenario, Montevideo
Referee: Carlos Amarilla (Paraguay)

27 October 1999

Mexico	0 – 0	Ecuador

Robertson Stadium, Houston
Attendance: 30,000
Referee: Ali Saheli (United States)

===== Canada Cup =====
Ecuador was invited to play in the Canada Cup, a friendly competition amongst national sides held in Edmonton. Ecuador won the competition for the senior side's first international trophy.

2 June 1999

Ecuador	1 – 1	Iran
Montaño 39'		Mousavi 66'

Commonwealth Stadium, Edmonton
Attendance: 5,386
Referee: Mike Seifert (Canada)

4 June 1999

Ecuador	3 – 1	Guatemala
Graziani 15', 56'; Delgado 48'		Rivera 20'

Commonwealth Stadium, Edmonton
Attendance: 8,865
Referee: Jerry Proctor (Canada)

6 June 1999

Canada	1 – 2	Ecuador
Xausa 50'		Graziani 17'; DeVos 54' (o.g.)

Commonwealth Stadium, Edmonton
Attendance: 10,026
Referee: Antonio Marrufo (Mexico)

== Notes ==
1.Not a full FIFA international match because Denmark fielded a team with only players from its own league.
2.Guatemala fielded its U-23 team. It is still considered as a full FIFA international match.
3.Canada fielded its U-23 team. It is still considered as a full FIFA international match.
