= Aurelio Molina =

Mexican footballer (born 1978)

Personal information
- Full name: Aurelio Molina Fraga
- Date of birth: 6 August 1978 (age 48)
- Place of birth: Monterrey, Nuevo Leon, Mexico
- Height: 1.74 m (5 ft 9 in)
- Position: Defender

Senior career*
Years	Team	Apps	(Gls)
2000–2001	Tigres	3	(0)
2002	Celaya	14	(0)
2003	Colibríes	13	(0)
2004–2009	Dorados	168	(5)
2005–2006	→ Tijuana (loan)		
2009–2010	Veracruz	28	(2)
2010–2011	Dorados	23	(1)
- * Club domestic league appearances and goals as of 19 May 2009

Aurelio Molina (born August 6, 1978) is a Mexican former professional Association football player.
