= César Gradito =

Argentine footballer (born 1979)

Personal information
- Full name: César Luis Gradito Villarreal
- Date of birth: 1 January 1979 (age 47)
- Place of birth: Córdoba, Argentina
- Height: 1.80 m (5 ft 11 in)
- Position: Attacking midfielder

Senior career*
Years	Team	Apps	(Gls)
1997–1999	Talleres de Córdoba		
1999–2000	Tigre		
2001–2002	Astros		
2002–2003	Atlético Cihuatlán		
2003	Jaguares de Tapachula		
2004–2007	Atlas	63	(1)
2007–2008	Sinaloa		
2008–2009	Tijuana		
2010	Estudiantes	1	(0)
2010	Correcaminos		
- * Club domestic league appearances and goals as of 8 March 2010

César Luis Gradito Villarreal (born 1 January 1979) is an Argentine who naturalized as a Mexican former footballer.

He arrived in Mexico in 2004 when he was transferred to F.C. Atlas, where he played until 2007. He was sent to Liga de Ascenso, where he played in clubs such as Dorados and Club Tijuana. In 2010 it was announced that Gradito would return to Primera División de México with Estudiantes Tecos.
