= Ricardo Pérez (Colombian footballer) =

Colombian footballer (born 1973)

Ricardo Pérez Tamayo
Personal information
- Full name: Ricardo Pérez Tamayo
- Date of birth: 21 July 1973 (age 53)
- Place of birth: Bogotá, Colombia
- Position: Forward

Senior career*
Years	Team	Apps	(Gls)
1992–1993	Millonarios	86	(28)
1994–1996	América de Cali	80	(15)
1997	Millonarios	46	(17)
1998	América de Cali	16	(5)
1999	LDU Quito	11	(5)
1999	Sichuan Quanxing		
2000	América de Cali	12	(3)
2000	Al-Ahli		
2001	Al-Hilal		
2002–2003	Bani Yas		
2003	Millonarios		
2003–2004	Académica	6	(0)
2005–2006	Millonarios	17	(2)

International career
1997	Colombia	3	(1)
- * Club domestic league appearances and goals

Ricardo Pérez

22nd President of América de Cali
- In office 30 May 2018 – 16 December 2019
- Preceded by: Tulio Gómez
- Succeeded by: Mauricio Romero

Personal details
- Born: 21 July 1973 (age 53) Bogotá, Colombia
- Spouse: Johanna Rubiano
- Children: 4
- Profession: retired footballer, actor, model, presenter, businessperson and sports leader

Ricardo "Gato" Pérez Tamayo (born 21 July 1973) is a retired Colombian footballer.

He was president of the América de Cali between 2018 and 2019, at which time the team was champion of the 2019 Torneo Finalización

== Club career ==
Pérez began his professional career with Millonarios, where he would spend most of his playing career. After a wonderful 1993 Copa Mustang (scoring 17 goals in 44 matches), he was bought by "giants" América de Cali for an undisclosed fee. After three years at América, he did not enjoy a lot of confidence from the coach, so he returned on loan to Millonarios. At Millonarios again, he scored 17 goals in 46 matches, being one of the tournament's best players in 1997.

== Club Career Stats ==
As of 7 November 2020

Club	Season	Pro League		Saudi Federation Cup		Crown Prince Cup		Asian Cup Winners' Cup		Other		Total		
Club	Season	Apps	Goals	Apps	Goals	Apps	Goals	Apps	Goals	Apps	Goals	Apps	Goals	Assist
Al Ahli Saudi FC	1999–2000		21		2		2		3		8 (Note: Appearance in Saudi Founder's Cup)		36	
Career total			21		2		2		3		8		36	

Club	Season	Saudi Pro League		Saudi Federation Cup		Crown Prince Cup		AFC Champions League		Asian Super Cup		Asian Cup Winners' Cup		Arab Club Cups		Total		
Club	Season	Apps	Goals	Apps	Goals	Apps	Goals	Apps	Goals	Apps	Goals	Apps	Goals	Apps	Goals	Apps	Goals	Assist
Al-Hilal FC	2000–2001		9						1	2	2				4			
Al-Hilal FC	2001–2002		1								1		4		1			
Career total			10						1		3		4		5			

Club	Season	Qatar Stars League		Qatar Sheikh Jassem Cup		Crown Prince Cup		Qatar Emir Cup		Other		Total		
Club	Season	Apps	Goals	Apps	Goals	Apps	Goals	Apps	Goals	Apps	Goals	Apps	Goals	Assist
Al-Rayyan Sports Club	2001–02	4	7	0	0	0	0	4	3	0	0	8	10	
Career total		4	7	0	0	0	0	4	3	0	0	8	10	

Club	Season	Qatar Stars League		Qatar Sheikh Jassem Cup		Crown Prince Cup		Qatar Emir Cup		Other		Total		
Club	Season	Apps	Goals	Apps	Goals	Apps	Goals	Apps	Goals	Apps	Goals	Apps	Goals	Assist
Al-Gharafa Sports Club	2002–03	10	6	0	0	0	0	0	0	0	0	10	6	
Career total		10	6	0	0	0	0	0	0	0	0	10	6	

Club	Season	Qatar Stars League		Qatar Sheikh Jassem Cup		Crown Prince Cup		Qatar Emir Cup		Other		Total		
Club	Season	Apps	Goals	Apps	Goals	Apps	Goals	Apps	Goals	Apps	Goals	Apps	Goals	Assist
Al-Sailiya Sports Club	2002–03	0	0	0	0	0	0	3	0	0	0	3	0	
Career total		0	0	0	0	0	0	3	0	0	0	3	0	

== International career ==
Pérez made several appearances for the senior Colombia national football team.
