= Marcelo de Faria =

Brazilian footballer

Personal information
- Full name: Édson Marcelo de Faria Manfron
- Date of birth: February 8, 1979 (age 47)
- Place of birth: Curitiba, Brazil
- Height: 1.81 m (5 ft 11 1/2 in)
- Position: Striker

Team information
- Current team: América-SP
- Number: 23

Youth career
- 1996–1997: Coritiba

Senior career*
Years	Team	Apps	(Gls)
1998–1999	Malutrom		
1999–2000	América	23	(5)
2000–2001	Irapuato	32	(7)
2001–2004	San Luis	69	(27)
2004	Porto-PE		
2004–2006	Ajaccio	62	(5)
2007	Villa Rio-RJ		
2007	Vasco (Loan)	1	
2008	Portuguesa-SP (Loan)		
2009–2010	Paykan		
2010–2011	Ionikos		
2011	Doxa Drama		
2012–	América-SP		
- * Club domestic league appearances and goals

Édson Marcelo de Faria Manfron, Tamandaré or simply Marcelo de Faria (born February 8, 1979, in Curitiba), is a former Brazilian striker. He last played for América-SP.

== Club career ==
He joined the Iranian club Paykan in 2010 and was one of the regular players of the team.

Club performance			League		Cup		Continental		Total	
Season	Club	League	Apps	Goals	Apps	Goals	Apps	Goals	Apps	Goals
Iran			League		Hazfi Cup		Asia		Total	
2009–10	Paykan	Persian Gulf Cup	9	1			-	-		
Total	Iran		9	1			0	0		
Career total			9	1			0	0		
