= Ezequiel Maggiolo =

Argentine footballer and coach

Personal information
- Full name: Ezequiel Carlos Maggiolo
- Date of birth: June 15, 1977 (age 49)
- Place of birth: Martínez, Argentina
- Height: 1.81 m (5 ft 11 in)
- Position: Centre forward

Team information
- Current team: Tigre (assistant)

Senior career*
Years	Team	Apps	(Gls)
1996–1999	Tigre	82	(37)
1999	LDU Quito	35	(14)
2000–2001	Los Andes	21	(11)
2001–2005	Estudiantes	75	(29)
2005–2006	Olimpo	33	(14)
2006–2008	Estudiantes	45	(10)
2008–2009	→ UACJ (loan)	35	(9)
2009–2011	Atlético Nacional	51	(17)
2011	Olimpo	18	(5)
2011–2013	Tigre	58	(10)
2013–2014	Belgrano	17	(4)
2014	All Boys	9	(0)
Total		479	(160)

Managerial career
- 2017: Estudiantes (assistant)
- 2018–: Tigre (assistant)
- * Club domestic league appearances and goals

Ezequiel Carlos Maggiolo (born June 15, 1977, in Martínez) is a retired Argentine football forward. He is currently the assistant coach of Tigre.

== Career ==
Maggiolo started his career in the Argentine 3rd division in 1996, in 1998 the club were promoted to the 2nd division. In 1999 Maggiolo moved to Ecuador to play for LDU Quito where he won his first major title; the 1999 Campeonato Ecuatoriano de Fútbol.

In 2000 Maggiolo returned to Argentina to play for newly promoted side Club Atlético Los Andes, but the 2000–2001 season did not progress well and Los Andes finished bottom of the table to be relegated back to the 2nd division.

Maggiolo left Los Andes in the summer to join Estudiantes for his first spell with the club, he played for them between 2001 and 2005 before moving to Olimpo de Bahía Blanca for the 2005–2006 season. At the end of the season Olimpo finished 18th in the table necessitating a playoff with Belgrano de Córdoba, Olimpo lost the tie and Maggiolo experienced relegation from the Primera for the 2nd time in his career.

In 2006, Maggiolo was re–signed by the new Estudiantes manager Diego Simeone. He helped the club to win their first league title in 23 years, when it won the championship decider against Boca Juniors to claim the Apertura 2006 championship. Maggiolo made 12 appearances during the championship season, including a 20-minute substitute appearance in the 2–1 victory over Boca Juniors.

As of October 2007 19 of Maggiolo's 29 appearances have been as a substitute, thus distorting his goals per game average quite dramatically.

== Titles ==
Season	Club	Title
1999	LDU Quito	Ecuadorian football championship
Apertura 2006	Estudiantes	Primera Division Argentina
