= Moctezuma Serrato =

Mexican footballer (born 1976)

Personal information
- Full name: Moctezuma Serrato Salinas
- Date of birth: 14 September 1976 (age 50)
- Place of birth: Cuernavaca, Morelos, Mexico
- Height: 1.84 m (6 ft 0 in)
- Position: Striker

Senior career*
Years	Team	Apps	(Gls)
1999–2002	San Luis		
2002	América	4	(0)
2003	San Luis	12	(2)
2003–2004	Pumas	8	(3)
2004–2005	Tecos	8	(0)
2005	Cienciano		
2006	Defensa y Justicia	6	(1)
2006	Águilas de Riviera Maya		
2007	Zacatepec		
2007	Lobos de la BUAP		
2007	Herediano		
2008	Pegaso Real de Colima		
2010	Peñarol La Mesilla		
2011–2012	Indios		
- * Club domestic league appearances and goals

Moctezuma Serrato Salinas (born 14 September 1976) is a Mexican former professional footballer who played as a striker.

== Career ==
Serrato was a product of the San Luis F.C. youth system. He joined the senior side and helped the club gain promotion to the Mexican Primera División in 2002. He was signed by Club América and made his Primera División debut with the Aguilas in April 2002. He would win the Primera División with América before returning to San Luis in 2003. Six months later, he joined Pumas for two seasons. A short stint with Tecos followed.

Serrato spent the remainder of his 13-year career playing in the lower divisions of Mexico football, with Zacatepec, Lobos de la BUAP and Indios de Ciudad Juárez, and travelling abroad to play for Cienciano in Peru, Defensa y Justicia in Argentina, C.S. Herediano in Costa Rica, and Peñarol La Mesilla and Deportivo Coatepeque in Guatemala. In May 2012, Serrato retired from playing football.
