= Raúl Alberto Salinas =

Mexican footballer (born 1978)

Personal information
- Full name: Raúl Alberto Salinas Dorantes
- Date of birth: October 16, 1978 (age 48)
- Place of birth: Mexico City, Mexico
- Height: 1.72 m (5 ft 8 in)
- Position: Left wing back

Senior career*
Years	Team	Apps	(Gls)
2002–07	América	97	(0)
2006	→ Pumas (loan)	10	(0)
2007	Necaxa	-	(-)
2008	Veracruz	5	(-)

International career
2003	Mexico	2	(0)
- * Club domestic league appearances and goals as of 9 July 2006

Raúl Alberto Salinas Dorantes (born 16 October 1978), also known as La Bala Salinas (The Bullet Salinas), is a Mexican former footballer. His usual position was left wingback. He won two Mexican championship titles during his career, the first came in 2002 against Necaxa and the second in 2005 against Tecos UAG.

== Career ==
Excluding a six-month loan to Pumas in 2006, Salinas had played his entire career for Club América until his transfer to Necaxa. He made his professional debut on 6 January 2002 in a game against C.F. Pachuca. As a rookie, Salinas played in 20 games as his team conquered the Verano 2002 tournament. Salinas remained a regular in the América defense until an injury sidelined him during the Apertura 2003 tournament. The injury was a disheartening blow to the defender, who was never able to reclaim a regular spot in the starting lineup from there on out. Salinas Obtaining Two League Championship Wins With America in 2002 and later again in 2005, he would later appear in the final of 2007 but losing it against Pachuca.

Salinas' lack of activity prompted a change of scenery prior to the Clausura 2006 season, with the defender being shipped crosstown to Pumas on a loan. After starting in the first four games, Salinas was relegated to the bench for most of the remaining part of the season; returning to América at the start of the Apertura 2006 season. He was transferred to Necaxa for the start of the 2007 Clausura championship.
