= Raúl Duarte (footballer) =

Paraguayan footballer and manager (born 1969)

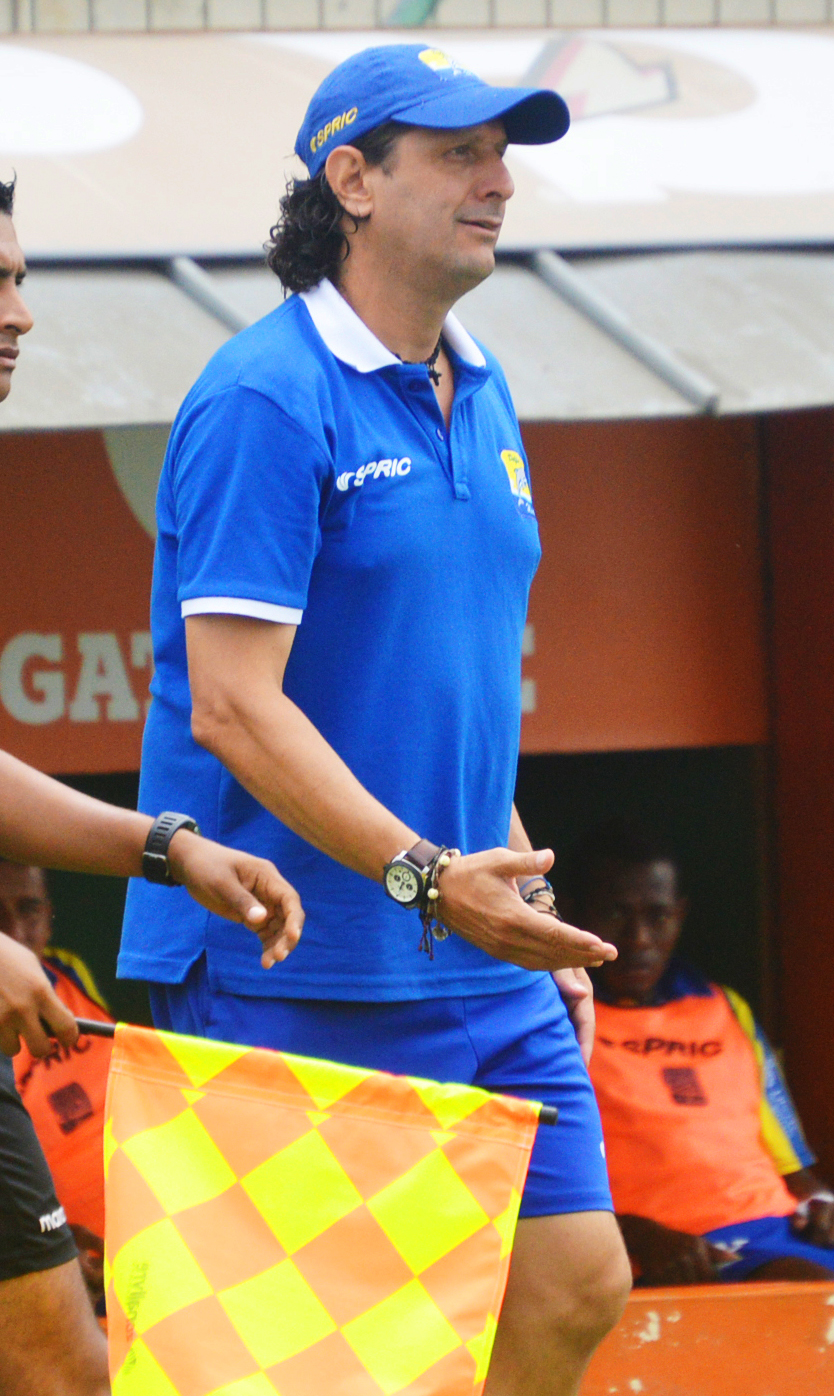
- Duarte leading Delfín in 2014

Personal information
- Full name: Raúl Ricardo Duarte Barrios
- Date of birth: 18 July 1969 (age 57)
- Place of birth: Alto Paraná, Paraguay
- Position: Forward

Team information
- Current team: Manta (manager)

Senior career*
Years	Team	Apps	(Gls)
	Atlético Tupí Guaraní	–	(–)
- Cerro Porteño
- Guaraní
1996–1997	12 de Octubre		
1998	Deportes Puerto Montt	28	(7)
1999	Huachipato	43	(22)
2000	Everton	17	(3)
2001	Deportes La Serena		(10)
2001	Aucas	17	
2002	Macará	27	(14)
2003	Delfín	14	(5)
2003	ESPOLI	11	(2)
2004	Deportivo Quevedo	39	(20)
2005	Universidad Católica (Quito)	21	(6)
2006	Deportivo Quevedo	8	(0)

Managerial career
- 2006: Deportivo Quevedo (caretaker)
- 2008: Emelec (assistant)
- 2010: Deportivo Quevedo
- 2011: Venecia
- 2012–2013: Deportivo Quevedo
- 2014: Delfín
- 2015–2016: Fuerza Amarilla
- 2017: Deportivo Quevedo
- 2018–2019: Fuerza Amarilla
- 2020: Deportivo Quito
- 2021: Cumbayá
- 2022–2023: Deportivo Quito
- 2025–2026: LDU Portoviejo
- 2026–: Manta
- * Club domestic league appearances and goals

Raúl Ricardo Duarte Barrios (born 18 July 1969 in Asunción) is a Paraguay football manager and former player who played as a forward. He is the current manager of Ecuadorian club Manta.

== Career ==
Born in Alto Paraná Department, Paraguay, Duarte began his career with Atlético Tupí Guaraní at age 15. In his homeland, he had stints with Cerro Porteño, Guaraní, among others.

During his professional career, Duarte played for clubs in Chile and Ecuador. He retired in 2006, and started his managerial career in 2011, only working with teams of the latter country.

In Chile, he played for Deportes Puerto Montt, Huachipato and Everton in the top division. In the second level, he played for Deportes La Serena.

As a football coach, he led Deportivo Quevedo in 2006 at the same time he was a player after the manager was released. In 2008, he served as assistant coach of Juan Urquiza in Emelec. As a head coach, he had his first experience with Deportivo Quevedo in 2010.
