= Kilian Virviescas =

Colombian footballer (born 1980)

Personal information
- Full name: Kilian Edwin Virviescas Rojas
- Date of birth: 2 August 1980 (age 46)
- Place of birth: Bogotá, Colombia
- Height: 1.75 m (5 ft 9 in)
- Position: Left midfielder

Team information
- Current team: Unión San Felipe
- Number: 17

Youth career
- 1994–1998: América de Cali

Senior career*
Years	Team	Apps	(Gls)
1999–2003	América de Cali	84	(7)
2002	→ Real Cartagena (loan)	12	(0)
2003–2004	River Plate	16	(0)
2004–2005	San Lorenzo	11	(0)
2005	São Caetano	0	(0)
2006	La Serena	17	(0)
2006	Gimnasia LP	5	(0)
2007	Alianza Lima	3	(0)
2007	Santa Fe	8	(0)
2008–2009	Deportes Tolima	14	(0)
2010	Envigado	22	(0)
2011–2012	Unión San Felipe	55	(0)
2013	Patriotas	9	(0)

International career
2003	Colombia	3	(0)
- * Club domestic league appearances and goals as of 15 June 2012

Kilian Edwin Virviescas Rojas (Spanish pronunciation: [ˈkiljam biɾˈbjeskas], born 2 August 1980) is a Colombian former professional footballer who played as a left midfielder or full back, most notable for América de Cali, and Unión San Felipe.

Virviescas played three games with Colombia at the 2003 CONCACAF Gold Cup.

== Career ==
Virviescas joined America de Cali's youth ranks in 1994, until making his senior debut in the 1999 season. In 2002, he had a brief loan spell at Real Cartagena. While at America, he won the 2000 and 2001 league titles. In 2003, he joined River Plate for a brief spell which lasted a year, being part of the squad that finished runner up in the 2003 Copa Sudamericana and that won the 2004 Clausura. The following year he moved to San Lorenzo, another Buenos Aires club, for a brief spell which lasted about a year. In 2005, he completed a move to São Caetano of the Campeonato Brasileiro Série A, but never played an official match.

In January 2006, he joined Deportes La Serena on a short-term contract. In July 2006, he moved back to Argentina on a short-term contract until December with Gimnasia y Esgrima de La Plata. In January 2007, he joined Alianza Lima, only making three appearances before being released. In July 2007, he moved back to Colombia and joined Independiente Santa Fe.

For the 2009 season, he played with Deportes Tolima, with the club having an excellent Apertura campaign as the leaders of the regular season. In 2010, he played with Envigado. In 2011, he moved to Chilean club Unión San Felipe, where he made 55 appearances, and left as the club was relegated in 2012. For the 2013 Finalizacion, Virviescas played for Patriotas Boyaca, and retired shortly after the season ended.
