= Otilino Tenorio =

Ecuadorian footballer (1980-2005)

Personal information
- Full name: Otilino George Tenorio Bastidas
- Date of birth: 1 February 1980
- Place of birth: Guayaquil, Ecuador
- Date of death: 7 May 2005 (aged 25)
- Position: Forward

Senior career*
Years	Team	Apps	(Gls)
1998–2003	Emelec	142	(43)
2001	→ Santa Rita (loan)		
2004	Al-Nassr		
2004–2005	El Nacional	19	(13)

International career
2002–2005	Ecuador	13	(5)
- * Club domestic league appearances and goals

Otilino George Tenorio Bastidas (1 February 1980 – 7 May 2005) was an Ecuadorian professional footballer who played as a forward.

== Club career ==
Tenorio was born in Guayaquil, Ecuador. His nickname was 'Spiderman', because when he scored a goal in a football match he would cover his head with a Spider-Man mask as he celebrated.

He joined Emelec of Guayaquil when he was eleven, and went on to play for the club at a professional level. He was noted for his good finishing ability and his flamboyant mask celebration was enjoyed by many. In 2004, he moved to Saudi Arabian club Al-Nasr, where he had trouble settling and eventually moved back to Ecuador to play for El Nacional of Quito.

== International career ==
Tenorio was first selected for the Ecuador national team in 2004; however he did not play any matches that year due to an injury. By 2005, he had recovered and made some impressive displays both for his club and country.

== Death ==
Tenorio died in May 2005 due to an automobile accident suffered when he was travelling to Quevedo, to visit his family. The accident happened three days after he played for his country in a 1–0 win over Paraguay, which was a friendly match played in New York City. The car in which he was travelling collided with a gas truck on the Santo Domingo-Quevedo road. He was twenty-five.

As a homage to Tenorio during the 2006 FIFA World Cup, former teammate Iván Kaviedes pulled on a Yellow 'Spiderman' mask after scoring the third goal of Ecuador's triumphant 3–0 win over Costa Rica.
