= Carlos Gutiérrez (Colombian footballer) =

Colombian footballer (born 1972)

Personal information
- Full name: Carlos Enrique Gutiérrez Ortega
- Date of birth: July 11, 1972 (age 54)
- Place of birth: Dabeiba, Antioquía, Colombia
- Height: 1.79 m (5 ft 10 in)

Youth career
- Atletico Nacional

Senior career*
Years	Team	Apps	(Gls)
1992–1996	Atletico Nacional	24	(2)
1996–2001	America De Cali	12	(0)
2000	Deportivo Independiente Medellin	26	(1)
2001	Real Cartagena	28	(0)
2001 & 2004	→Club deportivo los millonarios (loan)	16	(1)
2002	Club Necaxa	8	(1)
2003	Centauros de Villavicencio	16	(2)
2003	Lagartos de Tabasco	4	(1)
2005	Deportes Quindio	3	(0)
2005	Deportivo Cuenca	30	(1)
2007–2008	[Club Deportivo La Equidad]		

International career
1995	Colombia	1	(0)
- * Club domestic league appearances and goals as of 11 July 2008

Carlos Enrique Gutiérrez Ortega (born July 11, 1972) is a retired Colombian football midfielder, who has represented his country.

== Club career ==
Gutiérrez made his debut in the Colombian First Division in 1995 with América de Cali. He played for atl nacional in 1996 and returned to America and played for real cartagena. While at America Gutiérrez participated in the 1998 Copa Libertadores and helped the club capture the 1999 Copa Merconorte, as well as two Colombian League titles. In 2001, he joined Millonarios and helped them capture the Copa Merconorte 2001. He scored two crucial away goals versus Necaxa in Mexico on November 20, 2001 helping his club reach the finals. He started both legs of the final versus Emelec of Ecuador, scoring the winning penalty during the penalty shootout. His performance against Necaxa helped him secure a contract with the Mexican side in 2002, he would go on to be a starter for Necaxa, appearing in 28 league matches and 6 playoff matches in his one year in Mexico. Following his stay in Mexico, Gutiérrez returned to Colombia as the star signing for Centauros Villavicencio. After playing well with Centauros, Gutiérrez returned to Millonarios in 2004. He did not play as much as he would like with Millonarios, so he moved to Deportes Quindío in 2005. He then moved to Ecuador for a short stay with Deportivo Cuenca where he would participate in the 2006 Copa Libertadores. After another short stay in Peru with Club Sport Áncash, Gutiérrez was signed by newly promoted La Equidad to add his experience to the squad. He helped lead La Equidad to its first domestic title by winning the Copa Colombia 2008.

== International ==
Gutiérrez represented Colombia at various levels. He was called up to the full national side in 1995 and appeared in one match.

== Titles ==
Season	Team	Title
1997	América de Cali	Fútbol Profesional Colombiano
1999	América de Cali	Copa Merconorte
2000	América de Cali	Fútbol Profesional Colombiano
2001	Millonarios	Copa Merconorte
2008	La Equidad	Copa Colombia
