= Carlos Hidalgo (footballer, born 1979) =

Ecuadorian footballer

Personal information
- Full name: Carlos Ramón Hidalgo Ortega
- Date of birth: February 9, 1979 (age 47)
- Place of birth: Ecuador
- Height: 1.79 m (5 ft 10 in)
- Position: Midfielder

Senior career*
Years	Team	Apps	(Gls)
1996–2003	Emelec	171	(4)
2004	Deportivo Cuenca	33	(0)
2005	Deportivo Quito	25	(1)
2006–2007	El Nacional	59	(2)
2008–	Barcelona SC	43	(1)

International career^{‡}
1995	Ecuador U17		
2002–	Ecuador	4	(0)
- * Club domestic league appearances and goals as of 15 December 2009 ‡ National team caps and goals as of 15 December 2009

Carlos Ramón Hidalgo Ortega is an Ecuadorian former footballer who last played for Barcelona SC.

== Honours ==
=== Club ===
- Club Sport Emelec
  - Serie A de Ecuador: 2001–2002
- Deportivo Cuenca
  - Serie A de Ecuador: 2004
- Club Deportivo El Nacional
  - Serie A de Ecuador: 2006-2007
