= Carlos Infante =

Mexican footballer (born 1982)

Personal information
- Full name: Carlos Jesús Infante Figueroa
- Date of birth: February 14, 1982 (age 44)
- Place of birth: Neza, Mexico
- Height: 1.76 m (5 ft 9 in)
- Position: Right-back

Senior career*
Years	Team	Apps	(Gls)
2001–2003, 2006–2008	Club América	37	(2)
2004	UANL Tigres	2	(0)
2004–2005	CD Veracruz	11	(0)
2009	Necaxa	10	(0)
2009–2010	Puebla FC	1	(0)
2010–2011	Tiburones Rojos de Veracruz	13	(0)
2011	C.F. La Piedad	15	(1)
- * Club domestic league appearances and goals as of 25 October 2012

Carlos Jesús Infante Figueroa (born 14 February 1982) is a Mexican former football defender.

== Career ==
Infante made his professional debut in a game against Club León on 25 February 2001. The game ended with América and León tying at 1. Though Infante was used regularly as a substitute, América loaned him out to UANL Tigres prior to the Clausura 2004 season. Appearing only in 2 games as a substitute that season, Infante was loaned out again, this time to CD Veracruz. After a brief spell there, Infante returned to Club América, where he remains until he was dealt to Necaxa for the Clausura 2009 season.
