= Mauricio Romero (Colombian footballer) =

Colombian footballer (born 1979)

Personal information
- Full name: Mauricio Romero Sellares
- Date of birth: 1 August 1979 (age 47)
- Place of birth: Cali, Colombia
- Position: Midfielder

Senior career*
Years	Team	Apps	(Gls)
1999–2009	América de Cali	156	(15)
2002	→ Once Caldas (loan)	21	(3)
2005	→ Deportivo Pasto (loan)	15	(1)
2006	→ Deportes Quindío (loan)	17	(10)
2006–2007	→ Castellón (loan)	5	(0)
2007	→ Atlético Bucaramanga (loan)	17	(5)
2007	→ Atlético Junior (loan)	6	(1)
2008	→ Cúcuta Deportivo (loan)	17	(1)
2009	Cienciano	12	(2)
2009–2010	Deportes Quindío	31	(1)
2010	Estudiantes de Mérida	16	(3)
2011	Real Esppor	18	(2)
2012	América de Cali	27	(3)
2016–2017	Orsomarso	14	(1)
- * Club domestic league appearances and goals as of 29 September 2013

Mauricio Romero

23nd President of América de Cali
- In office 18 December 2018 – 28 December 2023
- Preceded by: Ricardo Pérez
- Succeeded by: Marcela Gómez

Personal details
- Born: 1 August 1979 (age 47) Cali, Colombia
- Profession: Retired footballer, businessperson and sports leader

Mauricio Romero Sellares (born 1 August 1979) is a Colombian former football (soccer) midfielder.

He was a president of América de Cali of the Categoría Primera A in Colombia between 2019 and 2023.
