= Carlos González (footballer, born 1973) =

Mexican footballer

Carlos Eduardo González Ambríz (Note: In this Spanish name, the first or paternal surname is González and the second or maternal family name is Ambríz.) (born 5 November 1973) is a Mexican former footballer who played in the Mexican top flight.

== Career ==
He had his best years playing for Necaxa, where he played the final match of the 2002 season against Club América. He also played for Tampico Madero, his hometown team in Tampico, Querétaro and Monterrey. Early in his career, he played for the Mexican youth team alongside players such as Oswaldo Sánchez and Duilio Davino.
