= Carlos Castro (footballer, born 1970) =

Colombian footballer (born 1970)

Personal information
- Full name: Carlos Alberto Castro Herrera
- Date of birth: 17 August 1970 (age 56)
- Place of birth: Colombia
- Position: Striker

Senior career*
| Years | Team | Apps | (Gls) |
| 1988–1997 | Independiente Medellín | | |
| 1997–1999 | Atlético Nacional | | |
| 2000–2001 | Millonarios | | |
| 2002 | Necaxa | | |
| 2003 | Palmeiras | | |
| 2003 | Deportivo Pereira | | |
| 2004–2006 | Bajo Cauca | | |

International career
| 1995–2001 | Colombia | 10 | (0) |
- * Club domestic league appearances and goals

Carlos Alberto Castro Herrera (born 17 August 1970) is a Colombian former professional footballer who played as a striker.

== Playing career ==
Castro is the third player with the most games played in the Colombian Liga Dimayor since its restructuring in 1991. He is regarded as one of the best-performing strikers to play for Colombian side Millonarios during the 2000–2010 years. Altogether, during his playing career, he won the Inter-American Cup, the Merconorte Cup and the Colombian league, and was Colombian league top scorer twice.

== Post-playing career ==
After retiring from professional football, Castro worked as an assistant manager and owned a football academy.
