= Hugo Castillo (Peruvian footballer) =

Peruvian footballer (born 1978)

Personal information
- Full name: Hugo Segundo Alfredo Castillo Arteaga
- Date of birth: July 28, 1978 (age 48)
- Place of birth: Tarma, Peru
- Height: 1.79 m (5 ft 10 in)
- Position: Defensive midfielder

Team information
- Current team: Colegio Nacional Iquitos
- Number: 6

Senior career*
Years	Team	Apps	(Gls)
- Hijos de Yurimaguas
2004–2007	Olímpico Somos Perú		
2008–2011	Colegio Nacional Iquitos	107	(2)
2012–	Sport Áncash	12	(1)
- * Club domestic league appearances and goals as of 24 September 2012

Hugo Segundo Alfredo Castillo Arteaga (born July 28, 1978) is a Peruvian footballer who plays as a defensive midfielder. He currently plays for Sport Áncash in the Peruvian Segunda División.

== Club career ==
He made his official debut in the Peruvian First Division in Round 1 of the 2009 season against Sporting Cristal. He made his debut in the Max Augustín Stadium and lasted the entire match, which finished in a scoreless draw. In Round 8 that same season Castillo scored his first goal in the Peruvian First Division at home against Inti Gas Deportes. He scored his goal in the 90th minute of the match from a free kick, which resulted in a 1–0 win for his club.
