= José Carpio =

Ecuadorian football referee

José Patricio Carpio Guevara
- Born: 19 October 1966 (age 59)
- Occupation: Association football referee
- Known for: Refereeing matches in the 2002 FIFA World Cup qualification

José Patricio Carpio Guevara (born 19 October 1966) is an Ecuadorian association football referee, best known for having supervised several matches during the 2002 FIFA World Cup qualification in the CONMEBOL-zone. He also refereed at the Copa Libertadores (2006 and 2007).
