= San Luis F.C. =

Association football club in Mexico

San Luis FC
- Full name: San Luis Fútbol Club
- Nicknames: Reales (Royals); Gladiadores (Gladiators); Auriazules (Gold-and-Blues); Tuneros; Potosinos; El equipo del milagro (The Miracle Team)
- Short name: SNL, SLFC
- Founded: 23 September 1957; 68 years ago (as Santos de San Luis)
- Dissolved: 28 May 2013; 13 years ago

San Luis Fútbol Club, simplified as San Luis FC, was a Mexican professional football club based in San Luis Potosí. Until 2013, it competed in Liga MX, the top division of Mexican football, and played its home matches at the Estadio Alfonso Lastras. Founded in 1957 as Santos de San Luis, the club changed its name to Real San Luis in 1997, later renamed as Club San Luis in 2004, and finally in 2007, it changed to its last used name.

Nicknamed Tuneros, a reference to the tuna fruit, was later changed to Gladiadores. The nickname for the team was then changed to Reales. The nickname Tribu Real was a reference to the fact that the team was once named Real San Luis. Another nickname recently given to the team was El Equipo del Milagro (The Miracle team) because of the last-minute "miracle" to stay in the Primera División de México. San Luis played their home games at the Alfonso Lastras Rámirez Stadium. On May 28, 2013 it was confirmed the team would be moved to Tuxtla Gutiérrez, Chiapas, and be renamed Chiapas Fútbol Club.

== History ==
The team began playing the Tercera División de México where they were able to win the 1969–70 season gaining promotion to the Segunda División de México.

In the 1970–71 season San Luis was able to win the Segunda División. This automatically gave them the promotion to go to the Primera División de México for the 1971–72 season.

Their stint in the Primera División was cut short after losing the relegation playoff against Laguna in the 1973–74 season.

It did not take long for San Luis to once again win the Segunda División and in 1975–76 they achieved the title and the right for promotion for the 1976–77 season. This would lead to the Potosino classic in the top flight since Atlético Potosino had achieved promotion in the 1973–74 season as semi finalist.

Once again their stay in the Primera División did not last long. In the end of a great season in 1976–77 where they reached the championship playoff, the franchise was moved and sold to Tampico, Tamaulipas and renamed Tampico Madero, who took over their spot in the Primera División.

The team returned to the Primera División in the 2002–03 season, ending in the mid-table position. This stint was short-lived, since in the tournaments after that they did not do well, and they ended up being relegated after the 2003–04 season.

Their last stint in the Primera División was in the 2005–06 season, when they gain promotion after winning the 2004–05 Primera División 'A' de México.

After the 2012–13 season Querétaro was relegated to the Ascenso MX after accumulating the lowest coefficient over the past three seasons. Querétaro would have been replaced by the 2012 Apertura Ascenso MX champion La Piedad, who won promotion after defeating the Clausura 2013 winner Neza in a promotional play-off. However, on May 28, 2013, Querétaro's ownership announced that it bought out Jaguares de Chiapas and relocated the team to Querétaro, Querétaro, dissolving the old Querétaro team and ensuring that Querétaro would still have a team in the Primera División. It was also announced that San Luis would be moved to Tuxtla Gutiérrez, Chiapas and be renamed Chiapas F.C., replacing the new outgoing Querétaro. Finally, La Piedad confirmed that it would also be relocated to Veracruz and be renamed as C.F. Veracruz. These changes have sparked controversy in the Mexican press as Querétaro effectively bought its place back in the first division and newly promoted La Piedad completely lost its team. With this, the state San Luis Potosí was left without a team in top flight now having only Atlético San Luis, was formed in 2013, in the Ascenso MX after C.F. Veracruz was moved to the city of San Luis Potosí. Atlético San Luis is currently playing in the Primera División as of 2019, taking the original San Luis team's place.

== Honours ==
=== Domestic ===
==== Top division ====
- Primera División
  - Runners-up (1): Clausura 2006

==== Promotion divisions ====
- Primera División A
  - Champions (2): Verano 2002, Apertura 2004
  - Runners-up (1): Invierno 2001
- Campeón de Ascenso
  - Champions (2): 2002, 2005
- Segunda División
  - Champions (2): 1970–71, 1975–76
- Campeón de Campeones de la Segunda División
  - Runners-up (1): 1971
- Tercera División
  - Champions (2): 1969–70, México 1970
- Copa México de la Tercera División
  - Champions (1): 1969–70
- Campeón de Campeones de la Tercera División
  - Champions (1): 1970

== Club records ==
- Seasons in 1st: 26
- Seasons in 2nd: 4
- Most Goals in Favor: 6–3 vs UNAM **(27-Oct-2002)**
- Most Goals Against: 1–6 vs América **(31-Oct-1971)**
- Best Position in Table: 1º (Apertura 2008)
- Worst Position in Table: 19º
- Best Scorer: (Argentina) (Mexico) Oscar Ariel González Mezzenasco (51 Goals)
- GK with less goals against: (Mexico) Adrián Martínez
- Most Games Played: (Mexico) Adrián Martínez (160 Games)

=== Top goalscorers ===
**San Luis Fútbol Club**
Rank	Player	Goals
1	(Argentina) Ariel González	51 Goals
2	(Argentina) Alfredo Moreno	40 Goals
3	(Brazil) Marcelo	27 Goals
4	(Mexico) Braulio Luna	20 Goals
5	(Mexico) Angel Lemus	16 Goals
6	(Colombia) Tressor Moreno	16 Goals
7	(Peru) Wilmer Aguirre	13 Goals
8	(Mexico) Israel Martínez	13 Goals
9	(Uruguay) Víctor Piríz	12 Goals
10	(Mexico) Ángel Reyna	10 Goals

- Players in **bold** are currently active with San luis.
- Players in italic are still active but are not currently with San Luis.

== Managers ==
- (Mexico) Juan Antonio Luna (July 2002 – March 3)
- (Argentina) Abel Alves (July 2003 – Oct 03)
- (Uruguay) Wilson Graniolatti (Oct 2003 – March 4)
- (Chile) Carlos Reinoso (2004)
- (Mexico) Cristóbal Ortega (2005)
- (Mexico) Raúl Arias (Nov 2005 – Dec 08)
- (Argentina) Luis Scatolaro (Jan 2009 – June 9)
- (Mexico) Juan Antonio Luna (July 2009 – Oct 09)
- (Argentina) Miguel Ángel López (Oct 2009 – Dec 09)
- (Mexico) Ignacio Ambriz (Jan 2010 – Dec 11)
- (Mexico) Isidoro García (Jan 2012 – Feb 12)
- (Mexico) Sergio Bueno (Feb 2012 – May 12)
- (Mexico) José Luis Trejo (July 2012 – Aug 12)
- (Ecuador) Álex Aguinaga (Aug 2012 – Nov 12)
- (Mexico) Eduardo Fentanes (Jan 2013 – Feb 13)
- (Uruguay) Carlos María Morales (Feb 2013 – March 13)
- (Mexico) Gerardo Silva (March 2013 – May 13)
