= 2024 CONCACAF Champions Cup final =

- Event: 2024 CONCACAF Champions Cup
Pachuca	Columbus Crew
(Mexican Football Federation)	(United States Soccer Federation)
3	0
- Date: 1 June 2024
- Venue: Estadio Hidalgo, Pachuca
- Referee: Iván Barton (El Salvador)

The 2024 CONCACAF Champions Cup final was the final match of the 2024 CONCACAF Champions Cup, the 59th season of North America, Central America, and the Caribbean's premier club association football tournament organized by CONCACAF. It was played at Estadio Hidalgo in Pachuca, Mexico, on 1 June 2024.

The final was a single match contested by Pachuca of Liga MX and the Columbus Crew of Major League Soccer. Pachuca hosted the match due to their better record during the competition's earlier stages. The final was originally scheduled to take place on 2 June 2024. However, CONCACAF announced that the date would move if a Mexican team hosts the final due to the 2024 Mexican general election taking place that day. After determining that Pachuca was the host, the date was moved up one day to 1 June.

== Background ==
=== Previous finals ===
Team	Previous final appearances (bold indicates winners)
(Mexican Football Federation) Pachuca	5 (**2002**, **2007**, **2008**, **2010**, **2017**)
(United States) Columbus Crew	0 (debut)

== Venue ==
This was the fifth CONCACAF Champions Cup final to take place at Estadio Hidalgo in Pachuca, Mexico, having previously been held in 2007, 2008, 2010, and 2017. The stadium is notable for its high altitude, sitting around 8,000 feet above sea-level.

=== Host selection ===
In the final (winners of SF1 vs. winners of SF2), the finalist which had the better performances in previous rounds (excluding round one), Pachuca, hosted the single-leg match.

==== Standings ====
Pos	Team	Pld	W	D	L	GF	GA	GD	Pts	Final
1	(Mexican Football Federation) Pachuca (H)	6	4	2	0	16	3	+13	**14**	Host
2	(United States Soccer Federation) Columbus Crew	6	3	3	0	9	5	+4	**12**	

Updated to match(es) played on 30 April 2024. Source: CONCACAF
Rules for classification: 1) Points; 2) Goal difference; 3) Goals scored; 4) Away goals scored; 5) Wins; 6) Away wins; 7) Disciplinary points (1 point for yellow card, 3 points for indirect red card, 4 points for direct red card, 5 points for yellow card and direct red card); 8) Drawing of lots (Regulations Article 12.9.5).
(H) Hosts

Due to 2024 Mexican general election taking place that day, CONCACAF announced that if a Mexican team were to host the final, CONCACAF would move the match and/or venue to another date.

== Road to the final ==
=== Summary of results ===
Note: In all results below, the score of the finalist is given first (H: Home; A: Away).

(Mexican Football Federation) Pachuca				Round	(United States Soccer Federation) Columbus Crew			
Opponent	Agg.	1st leg	2nd leg	Stages	Opponent	Agg.	1st leg	2nd leg
Bye				Round one	Bye			
(United States Soccer Federation) Philadelphia Union	6–0	0–0 (A)	6–0 (H)	Round of 16	(United States Soccer Federation) Houston Dynamo	2–1	1–0 (A)	1–1 (H)
(Costa Rican Football Federation) Herediano	7–1	5–0 (A)	2–1 (H)	Quarterfinals	(Mexican Football Federation) UANL	2–2 (4–3 p)	1–1 (H)	1–1 (4–3 p) (A)
(Mexican Football Federation) América	3–2	1–1 (A)	2–1 (H)	Semifinals	(Mexican Football Federation) Monterrey	5–2	2–1 (H)	3–1 (A)

== Format ==
While the rest of the tournament was played as a home-and-away two-legged match pairing, the final was a single-leg match where the winner would be crowned the champion. The "home" team for the match was the team with the better performance in the round of 16 and beyond.

== Match ==
=== Details ===
1 June 2024 (Note: The final match (originally scheduled for 2 June 2024) was moved back to 1 June 2024 due to a Mexican team hosting the final due to the 2024 Mexican general election taking place that day.)
21:15 (19:15 UTC−6)

Pachuca (Mexican Football Federation)	3–0	(United States Soccer Federation) Columbus Crew
Rondón 12', 67'; E. Rodríguez 32'	Report

Estadio Hidalgo, Pachuca
Referee: Iván Barton (El Salvador)

**Match rules**

- 90 minutes
- 30 minutes of extra time if necessary
- Penalty shoot-out if scores still level
- Twelve named substitutes
- Maximum of five substitutions, with a sixth allowed in extra time (Note: Each team was given only three opportunities to make substitutions, with a fourth opportunity in extra time, excluding substitutions made at half-time, before the start of extra time and at half-time in extra time.)

== Post-match ==
After the match, Columbus head coach Wilfried Nancy reported that members of the team and coaching staff had contracted a stomach illness—believed to be food poisoning—prior to the match while in Pachuca. Days later, Columbus president and general manager Tim Bezbatchenko suggested that the team may have been victims of "subterfuge".

Pachuca appeared in the 2024 FIFA Intercontinental Cup in December, winning their first match 3–0 against Botafogo. The team next upset Al-Ahly after a penalty shootout. In the final, Pachuca were defeated 3–0 by Real Madrid.

Pachuca also qualified for the 2025 FIFA Club World Cup due to their performance in the Champions Cup. On March 21, 2025, FIFA announced that Club Leon, who had similarly qualified due to a Champions Cup title, were disqualified from the competition, as both clubs were owned by Grupo Pachuca.
