= 1966–67 Mexican Segunda División season =

Segunda División de México
- Season: 1966–67
- Champions: Pachuca (1st Title)
- Matches played: 240
- Goals scored: 689 (2.87 per match)
- Top goalscorer: Ramón Guzmán (26 goals)

The 1966–67 Mexican Segunda División was the 17th season of the Mexican Segunda División. The season started on 6 August 1966 and concluded on 5 March 1967. It was won by Pachuca.

== Changes ==
- Nuevo León was promoted to Primera División.
- Zacatepec was relegated from Primera División.

== Teams ==
1966-67 Season Teams

Club	City	Stadium
Celaya	Celaya	Estadio Miguel Alemán Valdés
La Piedad	La Piedad	Estadio Juan N. López
Laguna	Torreón	Estadio San Isidro
Nacional	Guadalajara	Estadio Jalisco
Orizaba	Orizaba	Estadio Socum
Pachuca	Pachuca	Estadio Revolución Mexicana
Poza Rica	Poza Rica	Parque Jaime J. Merino
Puebla	Puebla	Estadio Olímpico Ignacio Zaragoza
Salamanca	Salamanca	Estadio El Molinito
Tampico	Tampico	Estadio Tamaulipas
Tepic	Tepic	Estadio Nicolás Álvarez Ortega
Texcoco	Texcoco	Estadio Municipal de Texcoco
Torreón	Torreón	Estadio Revolución
Ciudad Victoria	Ciudad Victoria	Estadio Marte R. Gómez
Zacatepec	Zacatepec	Estadio Agustín "Coruco" Díaz
Zamora	Zamora	Estadio Moctezuma

== League table ==
Pos	Team	Pld	W	D	L	GF	GA	GAv	Pts	Qualification or relegation
1	Pachuca (C, P)	30	17	12	1	54	18	3.000	46	Promoted to Primera División
2	Laguna	30	16	12	2	60	30	2.000	44	
3	Zacatepec	30	17	9	4	70	25	2.800	43	
4	Puebla	30	17	7	6	69	37	1.865	41	
5	Torreón	30	16	8	6	48	35	1.371	40	
6	Orizaba	30	13	10	7	40	32	1.250	36	
7	Poza Rica	30	11	11	8	43	31	1.387	33	
8	Tampico	30	11	11	8	43	39	1.103	33	
9	Ciudad Victoria	30	12	5	13	35	30	1.167	29	
10	Celaya	30	9	11	10	41	36	1.139	29	
11	Tepic	30	7	9	14	37	46	0.804	23	
12	Salamanca	30	5	13	12	26	41	0.634	23	
13	Zamora	30	9	3	18	46	70	0.657	21	
14	Nacional	30	8	4	18	36	73	0.493	20	
15	La Piedad	30	4	8	18	25	62	0.403	16	
16	Texcoco	30	1	1	28	16	84	0.190	3	

Source: RSSSF
(C) Champions; (P) Promoted

== Results ==
Home \ Away	CEL	LPD	LAG	NAC	ORI	PAC	PZR	PUE	SAL	TAM	TEP	TEX	TOR	VIC	ZAC	ZAM
Celaya	—	5–0	0–3	3–1	1–2	0–1	0–0	2–2	0–0	3–1	1–2	6–2	0–0	1–0	0–2	2–1
La Piedad	1–2	—	0–0	0–3	0–1	1–1	0–0	2–3	1–2	1–4	1–0	3–1	2–2	0–1	0–0	2–1
Laguna	1–1	1–1	—	7–3	3–3	0–0	2–1	5–3	1–1	2–0	3–1	6–1	2–1	2–0	3–1	3–2
Nacional	1–4	3–0	1–5	—	0–4	1–2	0–3	2–4	2–2	1–0	3–2	1–0	0–2	1–0	0–2	3–2
Orizaba	2–1	3–2	0–0	3–0	—	0–1	0–0	0–0	1–1	1–0	0–3	2–1	1–1	2–1	0–0	3–2
Pachuca	1–0	1–0	1–1	4–0	0–0	—	3–1	3–3	3–2	0–0	2–2	3–1	3–1	2–0	1–1	5–1
Poza Rica	1–1	5–1	1–0	3–1	1–1	0–3	—	1–0	2–2	4–1	2–1	3–0	0–1	0–0	2–2	2–1
Puebla	0–0	5–0	0–1	4–0	3–1	0–0	3–1	—	3–0	2–1	1–0	7–1	3–1	1–0	2–1	7–2
Salamanca	0–0	3–0	0–1	1–1	1–2	0–1	0–0	0–2	—	1–1	1–1	1–0	0–1	1–0	0–0	0–1
Tampico	2–2	2–2	1–1	1–0	2–1	0–0	0–0	2–1	2–2	—	2–1	3–0	0–0	1–1	2–3	3–1
Tepic	1–1	1–1	2–0	3–3	1–2	1–1	0–0	2–3	3–0	1–1	—	3–0	1–1	1–0	0–1	2–1
Texcoco	0–1	0–1	1–2	0–2	0–0	0–5	0–4	0–4	1–2	1–2	1–0	—	0–5	0–3	0–1	1–2
Torreón	2–0	3–2	2–2	3–0	3–2	1–5	1–0	2–2	3–1	0–3	1–0	2–0	—	2–0	2–1	4–1
Ciudad Victoria	3–1	5–0	0–0	2–0	1–0	1–0	1–3	0–0	1–0	1–2	3–0	3–2	0–0	—	3–1	3–0
Zacatepec	2–2	3–1	2–2	4–0	1–0	0–0	3–1	4–1	5–0	5–1	6–1	4–0	4–0	4–0	—	7–1
Zamora	2–1	1–0	0–1	3–3	2–3	0–2	3–2	3–0	2–2	1–3	4–1	3–2	0–1	3–2	0–0	—

Source: RSSSF
Legend: Blue = home team win; Yellow = draw; Red = away team win.
