= 1997–98 Primera División A season =

Season of a Mexican football league

Primera División A de México
- Season: 1997–98
- Champions: Invierno: Pachuca (2nd title); Verano: Tigrillos UANL (1st title); Campeón de Ascenso: Pachuca (1st title)
- Promoted: Pachuca
- Relegated: Marte
- Top goalscorer: Invierno: Níver Arboleda (17); Verano: Carlos María Morales (12)

Primera División A (Méxican First A Division) is a Mexican football tournament. This season was composed of Invierno 1997 and Verano 1998 tournaments. Pachuca were the Invierno 1997 champions and Tigrillos UANL were the Verano 1998 champions. The promoted club was Pachuca after winning the Campeón de Ascenso final.

== Moves ==
- Acapulco was bought by Toluca, the team was relocated to State of Mexico and renamed Atlético Mexiquense.
- Atlético Hidalgo relocated to Querétaro and renamed Halcones de Querétaro.
- Four new expansion teams: Unión de Curtidores, Chivas Tijuana, Tecos Colima and Cuautitlán.
- Pachuca was relegated from Primera División.
- Bachilleres UdeG was promoted from Segunda División.

== Stadiums and locations ==
Location of teams in the 1997–98 Primera División A

| Club | Stadium | Capacity | City |
|---|---|---|---|
| Atlético Mexiquense | Nemesio Díez | 35,000 | Toluca, State of Mexico |
| Bachilleres UdeG | Jalisco | 60,000 | Guadalajara, Jalisco |
| Chivas Tijuana | Cerro Colorado | 12,000 | Tijuana, Baja California |
| Cruz Azul Hidalgo | 10 de Diciembre | 17,000 | Cruz Azul, Hidalgo |
| Cuautitlán | Los Pinos | 8,000 | Cuautitlán, State of Mexico |
| Halcones de Querétaro | Corregidora | 35,000 | Querétaro, Querétaro |
| Irapuato | Sergio León Chávez | 26,000 | Irapuato, Guanajuato |
| La Piedad | Juan N. López | 15,000 | La Piedad, Michoacán |
| Marte | Mariano Matamoros | 18,000 | Xochitepec, Morelos |
| Pachuca | Hidalgo | 25,000 | Pachuca, Hidalgo |
| Real San Luis | Plan de San Luis | 18,000 | San Luis Potosí, S.L.P. |
| RS Zacatecas | Francisco Villa | 18,000 | Zacatecas, Zacatecas |
| Saltillo | Francisco I. Madero | 10,000 | Saltillo, Coahuila |
| San Francisco | San Francisco | 11,500 | San Francisco del Rincón, Guanajuato |
| Tampico Madero | Tamaulipas | 30,000 | Tampico - Ciudad Madero, Tamaulipas |
| Tecos Colima | Colima | 12,000 | Colima, Colima |
| Tigrillos UANL | Estadio Universitario | 40,000 | San Nicolás de los Garza, Nuevo León |
| UAT | Marte R. Gómez | 20,000 | Ciudad Victoria, Tamaulipas |
| Unión de Curtidores | La Martinica | 12,000 | León, Guanajuato |
| Yucatán | Carlos Iturralde | 24,000 | Mérida, Yucatán |
| Zacatepec | Agustín Coruco Díaz | 18,000 | Zacatepec, Morelos |

== Invierno 1997 ==
=== Group league tables ===
==== Group 1 ====
| Pos | Team | Pld | W | D | L | GF | GA | GD | Pts |
|---|---|---|---|---|---|---|---|---|---|
| 1 | RS Zacatecas | 20 | 11 | 5 | 4 | 38 | 26 | +12 | 38 |
| 2 | Pachuca | 20 | 8 | 11 | 1 | 42 | 36 | +6 | 35 |
| 3 | Bachilleres UdeG | 20 | 7 | 5 | 8 | 28 | 29 | −1 | 26 |
| 4 | Tigrillos UANL | 20 | 6 | 6 | 8 | 28 | 28 | 0 | 24 |
| 5 | Tecos Colima | 20 | 4 | 8 | 8 | 25 | 29 | −4 | 20 |
| 6 | Cuautitlán | 20 | 4 | 7 | 9 | 24 | 32 | −8 | 19 |

Source: Memoria Futbolera (subscription required)
Rules for classification: 1st points; 2nd goal difference; 3rd goals scored; 4th head-to-head; 5th away goals scored; 6th draw

==== Group 2 ====
| Pos | Team | Pld | W | D | L | GF | GA | GD | Pts |
|---|---|---|---|---|---|---|---|---|---|
| 1 | Yucatán | 20 | 10 | 6 | 4 | 33 | 20 | +13 | 36 |
| 2 | Tampico Madero | 20 | 8 | 9 | 3 | 32 | 25 | +7 | 33 |
| 3 | UAT | 20 | 8 | 6 | 6 | 31 | 30 | +1 | 30 |
| 4 | Unión de Curtidores | 20 | 7 | 8 | 5 | 27 | 22 | +5 | 29 |
| 5 | San Francisco | 20 | 5 | 2 | 13 | 30 | 32 | −2 | 17 |

Source: Memoria Futbolera (subscription required)
Rules for classification: 1st points; 2nd goal difference; 3rd goals scored; 4th head-to-head; 5th away goals scored; 6th draw

==== Group 3 ====
| Pos | Team | Pld | W | D | L | GF | GA | GD | Pts |
|---|---|---|---|---|---|---|---|---|---|
| 1 | Atlético Mexiquense | 20 | 14 | 2 | 4 | 44 | 24 | +20 | 44 |
| 2 | Zacatepec | 20 | 10 | 2 | 8 | 40 | 31 | +9 | 32 |
| 3 | Cruz Azul Hidalgo | 20 | 7 | 4 | 9 | 26 | 34 | −8 | 25 |
| 4 | Halcones de Querétaro | 20 | 5 | 4 | 11 | 24 | 38 | −14 | 19 |
| 5 | Reboceros de La Piedad | 20 | 3 | 8 | 9 | 25 | 43 | −18 | 17 |

Source: Memoria Futbolera (subscription required)
Rules for classification: 1st points; 2nd goal difference; 3rd goals scored; 4th head-to-head; 5th away goals scored; 6th draw

==== Group 4 ====
| Pos | Team | Pld | W | D | L | GF | GA | GD | Pts |
|---|---|---|---|---|---|---|---|---|---|
| 1 | Irapuato | 20 | 9 | 6 | 5 | 28 | 23 | +5 | 33 |
| 2 | Saltillo | 20 | 8 | 6 | 6 | 27 | 22 | +5 | 30 |
| 3 | Real San Luis | 20 | 6 | 7 | 7 | 21 | 28 | −7 | 25 |
| 4 | Chivas Tijuana | 20 | 4 | 7 | 9 | 23 | 33 | −10 | 19 |
| 5 | Marte | 20 | 4 | 5 | 11 | 22 | 37 | −15 | 17 |

Source: Memoria Futbolera (subscription required)
Rules for classification: 1st points; 2nd goal difference; 3rd goals scored; 4th head-to-head; 5th away goals scored; 6th draw

=== General league table ===
| Pos | Team | Pld | W | D | L | GF | GA | GD | Pts |
|---|---|---|---|---|---|---|---|---|---|
| 1 | Atlético Mexiquense | 20 | 14 | 2 | 4 | 44 | 24 | +20 | 44 |
| 2 | RS Zacatecas | 20 | 11 | 5 | 4 | 38 | 26 | +12 | 38 |
| 3 | Yucatán | 20 | 10 | 6 | 4 | 33 | 20 | +13 | 36 |
| 4 | Pachuca | 20 | 8 | 11 | 1 | 42 | 36 | +6 | 35 |
| 5 | Tampico Madero | 20 | 8 | 9 | 3 | 32 | 25 | +7 | 33 |
| 6 | Irapuato | 20 | 9 | 6 | 5 | 28 | 23 | +5 | 33 |
| 7 | Zacatepec | 20 | 10 | 2 | 8 | 40 | 31 | +9 | 32 |
| 8 | Saltillo | 20 | 8 | 6 | 6 | 27 | 22 | +5 | 30 |
| 9 | UAT | 20 | 8 | 6 | 6 | 31 | 30 | +1 | 30 |
| 10 | Unión de Curtidores | 20 | 7 | 8 | 5 | 27 | 22 | +5 | 29 |
| 11 | Bachilleres UdeG | 20 | 7 | 5 | 8 | 28 | 29 | −1 | 26 |
| 12 | Real San Luis | 20 | 6 | 7 | 7 | 21 | 28 | −7 | 25 |
| 13 | Cruz Azul Hidalgo | 20 | 7 | 4 | 9 | 26 | 34 | −8 | 25 |
| 14 | Tigrillos UANL | 20 | 6 | 6 | 8 | 28 | 28 | 0 | 24 |
| 15 | Tecos Colima | 20 | 4 | 8 | 8 | 25 | 29 | −4 | 20 |
| 16 | Cuautitlán | 20 | 4 | 7 | 9 | 24 | 32 | −8 | 19 |
| 17 | Chivas Tijuana | 20 | 4 | 7 | 9 | 23 | 33 | −10 | 19 |
| 18 | Halcones de Querétaro | 20 | 5 | 4 | 11 | 24 | 38 | −14 | 19 |
| 19 | San Francisco | 20 | 5 | 2 | 13 | 30 | 32 | −2 | 17 |
| 20 | Marte | 20 | 4 | 5 | 11 | 22 | 37 | −15 | 17 |
| 21 | Reboceros de La Piedad | 20 | 3 | 8 | 9 | 25 | 43 | −18 | 17 |

Source: Memoria Futbolera (subscription required)
Rules for classification: 1st points; 2nd goal difference; 3rd goals scored; 4th head-to-head; 5th away goals scored; 6th draw

=== Results ===
| Home \ Away | AMX | BAC | CHT | CRH | CUA | HAL | IRA | LAP | MAR | PAC | RSL | RSZ | SAL | SFR | TAM | TEC | TIG | UAT | UDC | YUC | ZAC |
|---|---|---|---|---|---|---|---|---|---|---|---|---|---|---|---|---|---|---|---|---|---|
| Atlético Mexiquense | | 1–0 | | | | | 3–1 | 3–3 | | | | | | | | 1–0 | 0–0 | 3–1 | 1–3 | 3–0 | 4–3 |
| Bachilleres UdeG | | | | | | | 3–1 | 1–1 | 1–5 | | 5–0 | 1–2 | | 1–0 | 0–0 | | | 3–1 | 2–2 | 6–1 | |
| Chivas Tijuana | 2–6 | 0–1 | | | 0–0 | 3–1 | | | | 0–3 | | | 2–2 | | | 2–1 | 7–1 | | | | 2–1 |
| Cruz Azul Hidalgo | 2–1 | | 1–0 | | 1–2 | 0–1 | | | 2–0 | 2–2 | | | 2–1 | | | 1–2 | 4–2 | | | | 3–1 |
| Cuautitlán | 1–2 | 1–1 | | | | | | | | | | | | | | 1–1 | 3–1 | 1–1 | 3–1 | 1–2 | 3–2 |
| Halcones | 4–0 | 1–3 | | | 3–1 | | 0–2 | | 2–0 | 1–2 | | | 7–2 | | | 0–4 | 1–1 | | | | 2–1 |
| Irapuato | | | 2–1 | 2–0 | 1–2 | | | 1–1 | 2–0 | | 2–1 | 3–3 | | 2–1 | 0–0 | | | 0–0 | 0–1 | 0–1 | |
| La Piedad | | | 1–1 | 1–3 | 2–1 | 1–0 | | | | 3–3 | 2–2 | 1–2 | 3–2 | 1–1 | 2–2 | | | | | | |
| Marte | 1–2 | | 1–2 | | 1–1 | | | 0–0 | | 5–2 | 1–4 | | | 2–1 | 1–1 | 1–1 | 3–2 | | | 1–3 | 0–4 |
| Pachuca | 5–1 | 2–0 | | | 2–2 | | 2–2 | | | | | | | | | 2–2 | 2–1 | 2–1 | 0–0 | | 2–5 |
| Real San Luis | 0–0 | | 2–1 | 0–0 | 5–2 | 1–2 | | | | 1–3 | | 2–1 | 1–0 | 2–1 | 1–1 | | | | | | |
| RS Zacatecas | 2–1 | | 1–1 | 2–1 | 3–0 | 3–2 | | | 0–2 | 1–1 | | | 2–1 | | | 2–1 | 0–1 | | | | 1–1 |
| Saltillo | 1–2 | 3–0 | | | 1–0 | | 0–0 | | 3–1 | 0–0 | | | | | | 2–1 | 2–1 | | 0–0 | | 2–0 |
| San Francisco | 1–2 | | 1–3 | 8–0 | 0–1 | 3–1 | | | | 0–0 | | 1–3 | 2–1 | | 1–3 | 4–0 | | | | | |
| Tampico Madero | 3–2 | | 1–1 | 0–0 | 4–1 | 2–0 | | | | 1–2 | | 2–2 | 2–4 | | | 1–5 | 0–0 | | | | |
| Tecos Colima | | 4–1 | | | | | 2–3 | 2–2 | | | 1–1 | | | | | | 0–2 | 1–1 | 1–1 | 2–2 | 1–2 |
| Tigrillos UANL | | 2–0 | | | | | 0–1 | 3–1 | | | 0–2 | | | 3–0 | | | | 4–3 | 1–1 | 2–2 | 2–3 |
| UAT | | | 2–1 | 1–0 | | 2–2 | | 2–0 | 2–0 | | 4–1 | 2–0 | 4–2 | 2–1 | 2–3 | | | | | 0–2 | |
| Unión de Curtidores | | | 1–1 | 1–1 | | 3–3 | | 3–1 | 4–2 | | 1–0 | 1–2 | | 2–1 | 0–1 | | | 2–2 | | 2–0 | |
| Yucatán | | | 4–1 | 1–1 | | 0–0 | | 2–0 | | 0–0 | 0–0 | 3–2 | 3–4 | 3–0 | 6–1 | | | | | | |
| Zacatepec | | 3–1 | | | | | 1–2 | 2–4 | | | 3–1 | | | 3–1 | 2–0 | | | 4–0 | 5–1 | 2–0 | |

Updated to match(es) played on 18 November 1997. Source: Memoria Futbolera (subscription required)
Legend: Blue = home team win; Yellow = draw; Red = away team win.

=== Liguilla ===
Quarter-finals
2 | RS Zacatecas (a) | 2 | 1 | 3
7 | Irapuato | 1 | 2 | 3
3 | Yucatán | 1 | 2 | 3
6 | Zacatepec | 1 | 0 | 1
1 | Atlético Mexiquense | 1 | 4 | 5
8 | Saltillo | 0 | 0 | 0
4 | Pachuca (a) | 1 | 1 | 2
5 | Tampico Madero | 1 | 1 | 2

Semi-finals
2 | RS Zacatecas | 0 | 2 | 2
3 | Yucatán | 1 | 1 | 2
1 | Atlético Mexiquense | 1 | 1 | 2
4 | Pachuca | 4 | 1 | 5

Final
2 | RS Zacatecas | 1 | 0 | 1
4 | Pachuca | 2 | 0 | 2

Champions
Pachuca
2nd title

=== Top scorers ===
| Scorer | Goals | Team |
|---|---|---|
| (Colombia) Níver Arboleda | 17 | Zacatepec |

Last updated: 18 November 1997.
Source: Memoria Futbolera (subscription required)

== Verano 1998 ==
=== Group league tables ===
==== Group 1 ====
| Pos | Team | Pld | W | D | L | GF | GA | GD | Pts |
|---|---|---|---|---|---|---|---|---|---|
| 1 | Tigrillos UANL | 20 | 10 | 6 | 4 | 34 | 22 | +12 | 36 |
| 2 | Pachuca | 20 | 7 | 8 | 5 | 34 | 29 | +5 | 29 |
| 3 | RS Zacatecas | 20 | 5 | 10 | 5 | 22 | 25 | −3 | 25 |
| 4 | Bachilleres UdeG | 20 | 4 | 9 | 7 | 27 | 29 | −2 | 21 |
| 5 | Tecos Colima | 20 | 5 | 6 | 9 | 22 | 33 | −11 | 21 |
| 6 | Cuautitlán | 20 | 3 | 9 | 8 | 28 | 33 | −5 | 18 |

Source: Memoria Futbolera (subscription required)

==== Group 2 ====
| Pos | Team | Pld | W | D | L | GF | GA | GD | Pts |
|---|---|---|---|---|---|---|---|---|---|
| 1 | Yucatán | 20 | 10 | 6 | 4 | 28 | 23 | +5 | 36 |
| 2 | UAT | 20 | 8 | 6 | 6 | 27 | 18 | +9 | 30 |
| 3 | Unión de Curtidores | 20 | 6 | 7 | 7 | 31 | 37 | −6 | 25 |
| 4 | Tampico Madero | 20 | 4 | 8 | 8 | 24 | 26 | −2 | 20 |
| 5 | San Francisco | 20 | 1 | 13 | 6 | 27 | 34 | −7 | 16 |

Source: Memoria Futbolera (subscription required)

==== Group 3 ====
| Pos | Team | Pld | W | D | L | GF | GA | GD | Pts |
|---|---|---|---|---|---|---|---|---|---|
| 1 | Zacatepec | 20 | 8 | 9 | 3 | 32 | 19 | +13 | 33 |
| 2 | La Piedad | 20 | 9 | 6 | 5 | 28 | 26 | +2 | 33 |
| 3 | Cruz Azul Hidalgo | 20 | 6 | 9 | 5 | 30 | 30 | 0 | 27 |
| 4 | Atlético Mexiquense | 20 | 5 | 9 | 6 | 28 | 28 | 0 | 24 |
| 5 | Halcones de Querétaro | 20 | 4 | 9 | 7 | 35 | 31 | +4 | 21 |

Source: Memoria Futbolera (subscription required)

==== Group 4 ====
| Pos | Team | Pld | W | D | L | GF | GA | GD | Pts |
|---|---|---|---|---|---|---|---|---|---|
| 1 | Real San Luis | 20 | 10 | 9 | 1 | 34 | 15 | +19 | 39 |
| 2 | Saltillo | 20 | 10 | 6 | 4 | 27 | 18 | +9 | 36 |
| 3 | Irapuato | 20 | 6 | 6 | 8 | 31 | 34 | −3 | 24 |
| 4 | Chivas Tijuana | 20 | 4 | 8 | 8 | 26 | 35 | −9 | 20 |
| 5 | Marte | 20 | 2 | 7 | 11 | 15 | 45 | −30 | 13 |

Source: Memoria Futbolera (subscription required)

=== General league table ===
| Pos | Team | Pld | W | D | L | GF | GA | GD | Pts |
|---|---|---|---|---|---|---|---|---|---|
| 1 | Real San Luis | 20 | 10 | 9 | 1 | 34 | 15 | +19 | 39 |
| 2 | Tigrillos UANL | 20 | 10 | 6 | 4 | 34 | 22 | +12 | 36 |
| 3 | Saltillo | 20 | 10 | 6 | 4 | 27 | 18 | +9 | 36 |
| 4 | Yucatán | 20 | 10 | 6 | 4 | 28 | 23 | +5 | 36 |
| 5 | Zacatepec | 20 | 8 | 9 | 3 | 32 | 19 | +13 | 33 |
| 6 | La Piedad | 20 | 9 | 6 | 5 | 28 | 26 | +2 | 33 |
| 7 | UAT | 20 | 8 | 6 | 6 | 27 | 18 | +9 | 30 |
| 8 | Pachuca | 20 | 7 | 8 | 5 | 34 | 29 | +5 | 29 |
| 9 | Cruz Azul Hidalgo | 20 | 6 | 9 | 5 | 30 | 30 | 0 | 27 |
| 10 | RS Zacatecas | 20 | 5 | 10 | 5 | 22 | 25 | −3 | 25 |
| 11 | Unión de Curtidores | 20 | 6 | 7 | 7 | 31 | 37 | −6 | 25 |
| 12 | Atlético Mexiquense | 20 | 5 | 9 | 6 | 28 | 28 | 0 | 24 |
| 13 | Irapuato | 20 | 6 | 6 | 8 | 31 | 34 | −3 | 24 |
| 14 | Halcones de Querétaro | 20 | 4 | 9 | 7 | 35 | 31 | +4 | 21 |
| 15 | Bachilleres UdeG | 20 | 4 | 9 | 7 | 27 | 29 | −2 | 21 |
| 16 | Tecos Colima | 20 | 5 | 6 | 9 | 22 | 33 | −11 | 21 |
| 17 | Tampico Madero | 20 | 4 | 8 | 8 | 24 | 26 | −2 | 20 |
| 18 | Chivas Tijuana | 20 | 4 | 8 | 8 | 26 | 35 | −9 | 20 |
| 19 | Cuautitlán | 20 | 3 | 9 | 8 | 28 | 33 | −5 | 18 |
| 20 | San Francisco | 20 | 1 | 13 | 6 | 27 | 34 | −7 | 16 |
| 21 | Marte | 20 | 2 | 7 | 11 | 15 | 45 | −30 | 13 |

Source: Memoria Futbolera (subscription required)

=== Results ===
| Home \ Away | AMX | BAC | CHT | CRH | CUA | HAL | IRA | LAP | MAR | PAC | RSL | RSZ | SAL | SFR | TAM | TEC | TIG | UAT | UDC | YUC | ZAC |
|---|---|---|---|---|---|---|---|---|---|---|---|---|---|---|---|---|---|---|---|---|---|
| At. Mexiquense | | | 0–0 | 1–1 | 2–0 | 0–0 | | | 4–1 | 1–3 | 1–2 | 1–2 | 2–0 | 1–1 | 4–0 | | | | | | |
| Bachilleres UdeG | 1–1 | | 2–2 | | 2–1 | 1–1 | | | | 3–0 | | | 2–0 | | | 2–1 | 2–0 | | | | 1–1 |
| Chivas Tijuana | | | | 2–3 | | | 2–1 | 1–2 | 1–1 | | 0–0 | 1–2 | | 3–2 | 2–2 | | | 1–1 | 1–1 | 2–0 | |
| Cruz Azul Hidalgo | | 3–1 | | | | | 3–2 | 2–3 | | | 1–1 | 0–0 | | 2–1 | 1–1 | | | 2–1 | 0–1 | 1–1 | |
| Cuautitlán | | | 2–3 | 2–1 | | 4–1 | 2–0 | 1–2 | 0–1 | 2–2 | 0–0 | 2–2 | 0–1 | 3–3 | 1–1 | | | | | | |
| Halcones | | | 1–1 | 3–3 | | | | 1–1 | | | 2–2 | 4–0 | | 4–1 | 2–1 | | | 1–1 | 3–4 | 1–2 | |
| Irapuato | 3–1 | 4–4 | | | | 3–1 | | | | 2–1 | | | 2–2 | | | 4–2 | 2–0 | | | | 1–3 |
| La Piedad | 1–1 | 2–1 | | | | | 4–5 | | 0–0 | | | | | | | 3–1 | 0–0 | 1–3 | 3–2 | 1–1 | 1–2 |
| Marte | | 2–1 | | 0–0 | | 0–6 | 0–1 | | | | | 0–0 | 1–3 | | | | | 2–1 | 1–1 | | |
| Pachuca | | | 3–0 | 1–1 | | 3–3 | | 0–1 | 3–3 | | 1–1 | 1–2 | 1–4 | 0–0 | 1–0 | | | | | 3–0 | |
| Real San Luis | | 3–3 | | | | | 0–1 | 3–1 | 3–1 | | | | | | | 2–0 | 4–1 | 1–0 | 4–0 | 2–0 | 0–1 |
| RS Zacatecas | | 0–0 | | | | | 0–0 | 7–2 | | | 1–2 | | | 2–2 | 2–1 | | | 2–1 | 0–0 | 4–4 | |
| Saltillo | | | 2–0 | 2–1 | | 1–0 | | 2–1 | | | 1–1 | 0–0 | | 2–0 | 5–2 | | | 1–0 | | 1–1 | |
| San Francisco | | 2–2 | | | | | 1–1 | 0–0 | 4–2 | | 0–0 | | | | | | 2–2 | 2–2 | 2–2 | 0–1 | 1–1 |
| Tampico Madero | | 1–1 | | | | | 0–0 | 3–1 | 6–0 | | 0–4 | | | 3–2 | | | | 1–0 | 0–0 | 0–2 | 3–0 |
| Tecos Colima | 0–0 | | 0–0 | 3–5 | 2–1 | 1–0 | | | 1–1 | 2–2 | | 3–2 | 1–0 | 1–1 | 2–1 | | | | | | |
| Tigrillos UANL | 2–2 | | 3–1 | 5–2 | 3–0 | 1–0 | | | 4–0 | 2–0 | | 1–0 | 0–0 | | 1–1 | 4–0 | | | | | |
| UAT | 1–1 | 1–0 | | | 1–1 | | 3–1 | | | 0–0 | | | | | | 2–1 | 3–0 | | 4–1 | | 1–0 |
| Unión de Curtidores | 3–2 | 1–0 | | | 1–1 | | 1–1 | | | 3–5 | | | 2–3 | | | 4–3 | 1–2 | | | | 3–1 |
| Yucatán | 1–1 | 1–0 | | | 3–3 | | 2–0 | | 2–1 | | | | | | | 2–0 | 1–2 | 1–0 | 5–4 | | 2–1 |
| Zacatepec | 3–0 | | 3–0 | 2–2 | 2–2 | 1–1 | | | 3–0 | 5–2 | | 0–0 | 1–1 | | | 1–1 | 0–0 | | | | |

Updated to match(es) played on 19 April 1998. Source: Memoria Futbolera (subscription required)
Legend: Blue = home team win; Yellow = draw; Red = away team win.

=== Liguilla ===
Quarter-finals
2 | Tigrillos UANL | 2 | 1 | 3
7 | Pachuca | 1 | 2 | 3
1 | Real San Luis | 1 | 1 | 2
7 | UAT | 2 | 1 | 3
4 | Yucatán | 0 | 0 | 0
5 | Zacatepec | 1 | 3 | 4
3 | Saltillo | 0 | 1 | 1
6 | La Piedad | 4 | 1 | 5

Semi-finals
1 | Tigrillos UANL | 2 | 1 | 3
7 | UAT | 1 | 2 | 3
5 | Zacatepec | 1 | 2 | 3
6 | La Piedad | 1 | 1 | 2

Final
1 | Tigrillos UANL | 1 | 3 | 4
5 | Zacatepec | 3 | 0 | 3

Champions
Tigrillos UANL
1st title

=== Top scorers ===
| Scorer | Goals | Team |
|---|---|---|
| (Uruguay) Carlos María Morales | 12 | Pachuca |
| (Uruguay) Daniel Fasciolli | 12 | UAT |
| (Brazil) Valtencir Gomes | 12 | Tigrillos UANL |
| (Costa Rica) Allan Oviedo | 11 | Unión de Curtidores |
| (Mexico) José Eduardo Ávila | 10 | Cuautitlán |

Last updated: 19 April 1998.
Source: Memoria Futbolera (subscription required)

== Relegation ==
| Pos. | Team | Pld. | Pts. | Ave. |
|---|---|---|---|---|
| 17. | Tecos Colima | 41 | 40 | 1.0258 |
| 18. | Halcones de Querétaro | 40 | 40 | 1.0000 |
| 19. | Chivas Tijuana | 39 | 40 | 0.9750 |
| 20. | Marte | 95 | 102 | 0.9314 |
| 21. | Cuautitlán | 37 | 40 | 0.9250 |

== Campeón de Ascenso 1998 ==
The super cup matches of the Primera División A between the Invierno 1997 champions and the Verano 1998 champions to determine the winners of the promotion to Primera División. The series faced Pachuca (Invierno 1997 champions) and Tigrillos UANL (Verano 1998 champions).

| Team 1 | Agg. | Team 2 | 1st leg | 2nd leg |
|---|---|---|---|---|
| Pachuca | 4–2 | Tigrillos UANL | 2–2 | 2–0 |

=== First leg ===
| 14 May 1998 | Tigrillos UANL | 2–2 | Pachuca | San Nicolás de los Garza, Nuevo León |
| | Gómes 28'; Oliva 79' | Report | Nunes 61'; Morales 76' | Stadium: Estadio Universitario; Referee: (Mexico) Felipe Ramos Rizo |

=== Second leg ===
| 17 May 1998 | Pachuca | 2–0 (4–2 agg.) | Tigrillos | Pachuca, Hidalgo |
| 12:00 | Almeida 9'; Victorino 48' | Report | | Stadium: Estadio Hidalgo; Attendance: 25,000; Referee: (Mexico) Gilberto Alcalá |

Champions
Pachuca
1st title
