= 2024 CONCACAF Champions Cup =

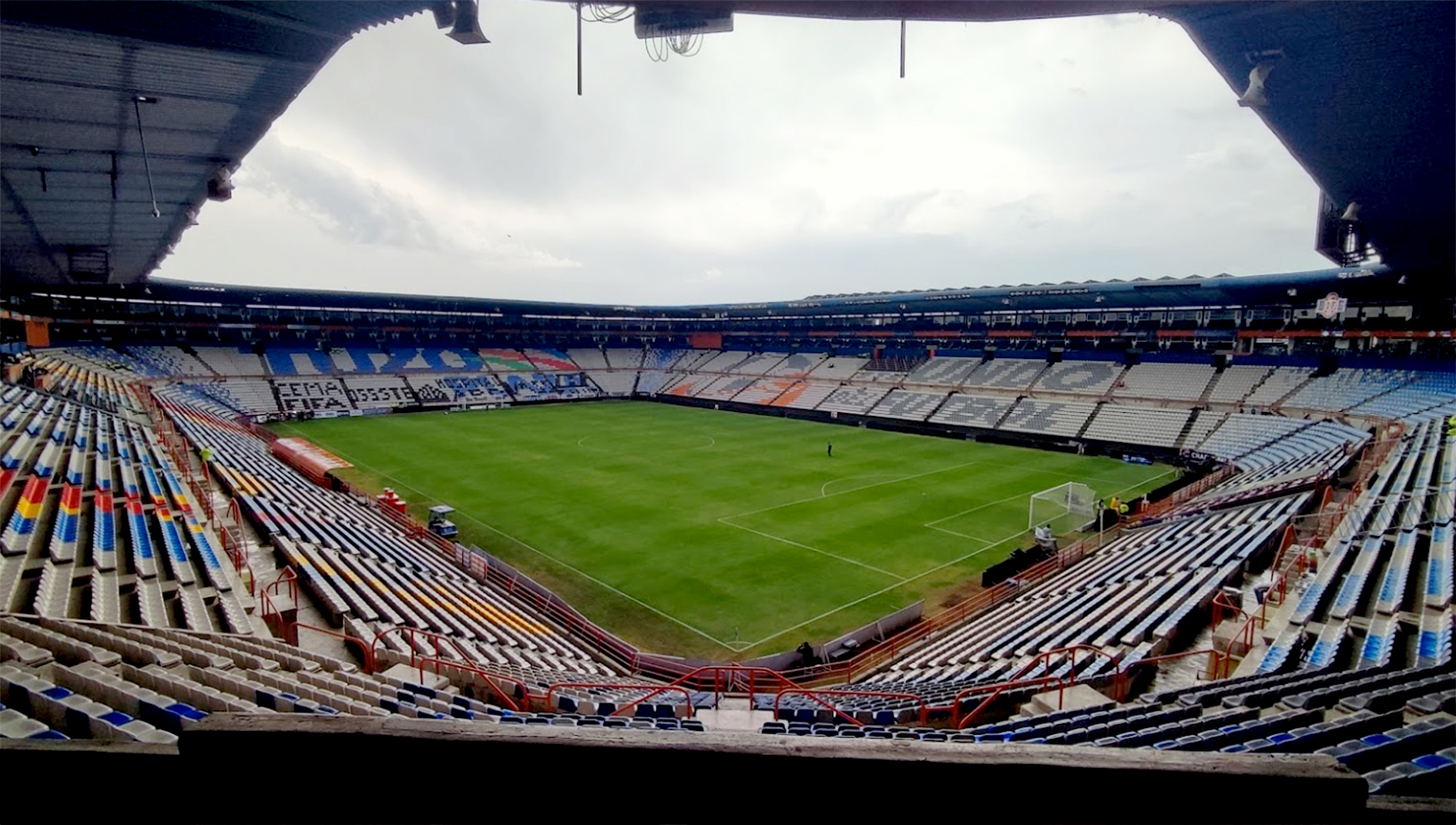
- Estadio Hidalgo in Pachuca hosted the final

Tournament details
- Dates: 6 February – 1 June
- Teams: 27 (from 10 associations)

Final positions
- Champions: (Mexican Football Federation) Pachuca (6th title)
- Runners-up: (United States Soccer Federation) Columbus Crew

Tournament statistics
- Matches played: 51
- Goals scored: 161 (3.16 per match)
- Attendance: 808,688 (15,857 per match)
- Top scorer(s): (Venezuela) Salomón Rondón (Pachuca); 9 goals
- Best player: (Venezuela) Salomón Rondón (Pachuca)
- Best young player: (Mexico) Emilio Rodríguez (Pachuca)
- Fair play award: (United States Soccer Federation) Columbus Crew

The 2024 CONCACAF Champions Cup was the 59th season of the North, Central America, and the Caribbean's premier club football tournament organized by CONCACAF, and the first since it was rebranded as the CONCACAF Champions Cup. This was the first season under a new format featuring 27 teams and a five-round knockout phase.

Pachuca won their sixth title, defeating Columbus Crew of MLS in the final 3–0. As winners, they qualified for the 2024 FIFA Intercontinental Cup, held in December. Pachuca also qualified for the 2025 FIFA Club World Cup in the United States, alongside the 2021 winners Monterrey, the 2022 winners Seattle Sounders FC, and the 2023 winners León. However, due to Pachuca and León sharing the same ownership, León was later disqualified from the tournament.

== Qualification ==
Twenty-seven teams qualified for the tournament, with five of them earning direct qualification to the round of 16. The remaining twenty-two teams entered in round one.

In addition to national league competitions in the United States, Mexico, and Canada, 12 of 27 berths were determined by international competitions, including the revamped North American zonal competition, the 2023 Leagues Cup (three), and the existing regional or zonal championships in the Caribbean and Central America, the CONCACAF Caribbean Cup (three) and CONCACAF Central American Cup (six), respectively.

Unlike in previous years, the three MLS teams based in Canada were eligible to qualify for the CONCACAF Champions Cup through slots allocated to MLS (five), in addition to the slot for the Canadian Championship winners, while two Canadian Premier League teams qualified automatically for the first time. The United States-only 2023 U.S. Open Cup knockout competition and the Canada-only equivalent, the 2023 Canadian Championship, provided one berth each.

The winners of the three zonal championships, along with the winner of MLS Cup 2023 and the highest-scored champion from the 2022–23 Liga MX season, received the five byes into the round of 16.

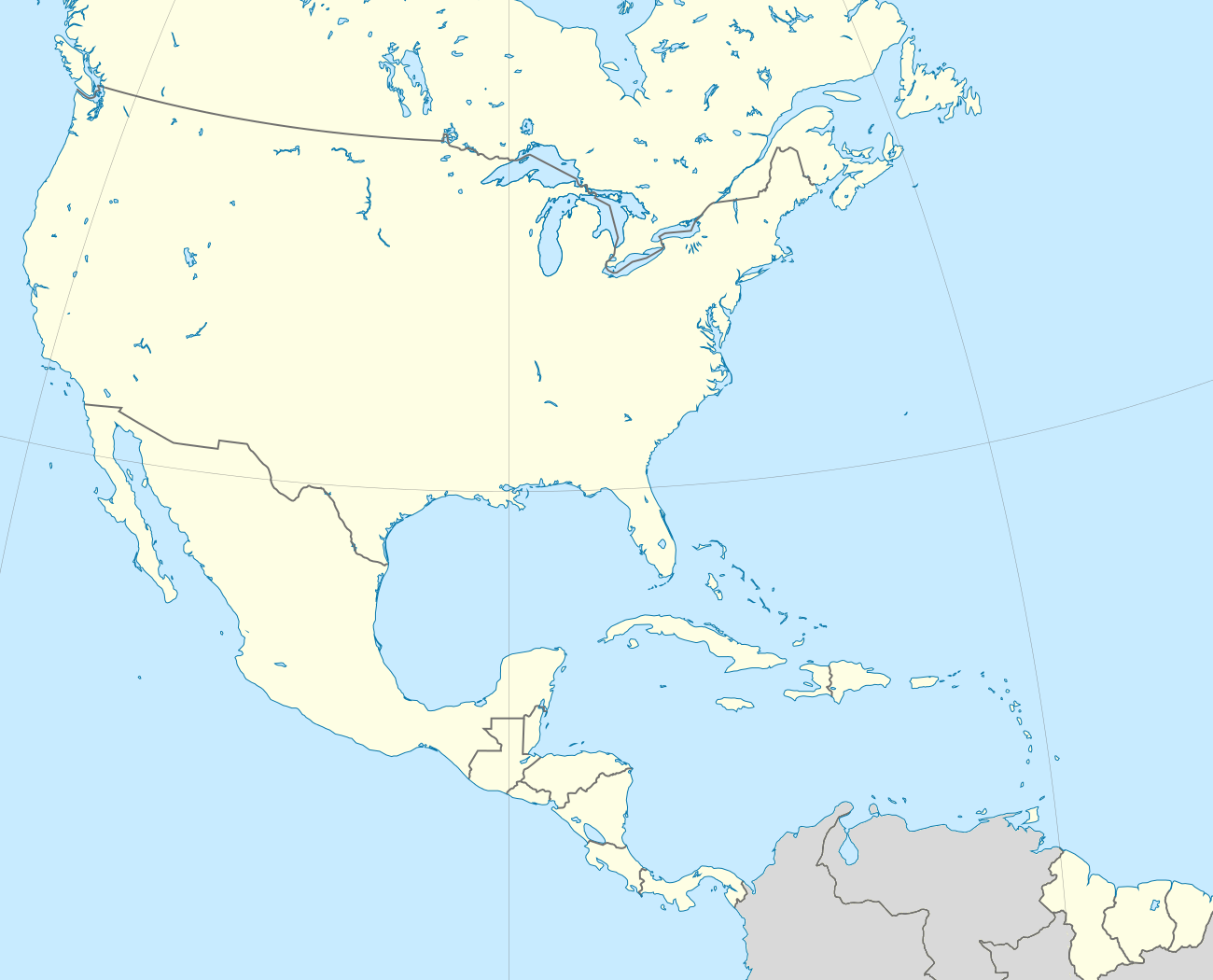
Location of teams of the 2024 CONCACAF Champions Cup
North American Zone Central American Zone Caribbean Zone

=== Distribution ===
A total of 27 teams (from 10 associations) qualified for the tournament.

- North American Zone: 18 teams (from 3 associations)
- Central American Zone: 6 teams (from 4 associations)
- Caribbean Zone: 3 teams (from 3 associations)

Five teams received a bye into the round of 16.

- The champion of the regional competitions for each of CONCACAF's constituent zones; North American, Central American and Caribbean
- The champions of Liga MX of Mexico and Major League Soccer of the United States and Canada (Liga MX had a split Clausura and Apertura system, so the champion team with the higher aggregate points took this place. However, if one team wins both Apertura and Clausura, they took that slot.)

The remaining 22 teams entered in round one.

- The runners-up and third-place team from the MLS–Liga MX Leagues Cup
- The runners-up and third-place team from the Caribbean Cup
- The runners-up, remaining semi-finalists, and two play-in winners from the Central American Cup
- The U.S. Open Cup champion
- The Canadian Championship winner
- The Canadian Premier League regular season winner and playoff champion
- The winner with the lower point total, two runners-up, and the two best next clubs by season aggregate from Liga MX
- The MLS Supporters' Shield winner
- The remaining MLS Conference regular-season leader, and the next two teams in the Supporters' Shield table

== Teams ==
The following table includes the number of appearances, last appearance, and previous best from the CONCACAF Champions Cup tournament.

Teams entering in round of 16 (5)
Competition	Team	Qualifying method	App. (last)	Previous best (last)
Caribbean Cup	(Surinamese Football Association) Robinhood	2023 Caribbean Cup champions	14th (1994)	Runners-up (1983)
Central American Cup	(Costa Rican Football Federation) Alajuelense	2023 Central American Cup champions	27th (2023)	Champions (2004)
Leagues Cup	(United States Soccer Federation) Inter Miami CF	2023 Leagues Cup champions	1st	Debut
Liga MX	(Mexican Football Federation) Pachuca	2022–23 Liga MX Apertura or Clausura champions with higher aggregate table points	10th (2023)	Champions (2016–17)
Major League Soccer	(United States Soccer Federation) Columbus Crew	MLS Cup 2023 champions	5th (2021)	Quarter-finals (2021)

Teams entering in round one (22)
Competition	Team	Qualifying method	App. (last)	Previous best (last)
Canadian Championship (1 berth)	(Canadian Soccer Association) Vancouver Whitecaps FC	2023 Canadian Championship champions	4th (2023)	Semi-finals (2016–17)
Canadian Premier League (2 berths)	(Canadian Soccer Association) Forge FC	2023 Canadian Premier League champions	2nd (2022)	Round of 16 (2022)
Canadian Premier League (2 berths)	(Canadian Soccer Association) Cavalry FC	2023 Canadian Premier League CPL Shield winners	1st	Debut
Caribbean Cup (2 berths)	(Jamaica Football Federation) Cavalier	2023 Caribbean Cup runners-up	1st	Debut
Caribbean Cup (2 berths)	(Dominican Football Federation) Moca	2023 Caribbean Cup third place	1st	Debut
Central American Cup (5 berths)	(Nicaraguan Football Federation) Real Estelí	2023 Central American Cup runners-up	12th (2021)	Round of 16 (2021)
Central American Cup (5 berths)	(Panamanian Football Federation) Independiente	2023 Central American Cup semi-finalists	2nd (2019)	Quarter-finals (2019)
Central American Cup (5 berths)	(Costa Rican Football Federation) Herediano	2023 Central American Cup semi-finalists	16th (2019)	Semi-finals (2014–15)
Central American Cup (5 berths)	(National Football Federation of Guatemala) Comunicaciones	2023 Central American Cup play-in winners	28th (2022)	Champions (1978)
Central American Cup (5 berths)	(Costa Rican Football Federation) Saprissa	2023 Central American Cup play-in winners	37th (2022)	Champions (2005)
Leagues Cup (2 berths)	(United States Soccer Federation) Nashville SC	2023 Leagues Cup runners-up	1st	Debut
Leagues Cup (2 berths)	(United States Soccer Federation) Philadelphia Union	2023 Leagues Cup third place	3rd (2023)	Semi-finals (2023)
Liga MX (5 berths)	(Mexican Football Federation) Tigres UANL	2022–23 Liga MX Apertura or Clausura champions with lower aggregate table points	11th (2023)	Champions (2020)
Liga MX (5 berths)	(Mexican Football Federation) Toluca	2022–23 Liga MX Apertura runners-up	13th (2019)	Champions (2003)
Liga MX (5 berths)	(Mexican Football Federation) Guadalajara	2022–23 Liga MX Clausura runners-up	9th (2018)	Champions (2018)
Liga MX (5 berths)	(Mexican Football Federation) Monterrey	Next two best clubs in 2022–23 Liga MX aggregate table	12th (2021)	Champions (2021)
Liga MX (5 berths)	(Mexican Football Federation) América	Next two best clubs in 2022–23 Liga MX aggregate table	15th (2021)	Champions (2015–16)
Major League Soccer (4 berths)	(United States Soccer Federation) FC Cincinnati	2023 Major League Soccer Supporters' Shield winners	1st	Debut
Major League Soccer (4 berths)	(United States Soccer Federation) St. Louis City SC	2023 Major League Soccer Western Conference regular season winners	1st	Debut
Major League Soccer (4 berths)	(United States Soccer Federation) Orlando City SC	Next two best clubs in the 2023 Supporters' Shield standings	2nd (2023)	Round of 16 (2023)
Major League Soccer (4 berths)	(United States Soccer Federation) New England Revolution	Next two best clubs in the 2023 Supporters' Shield standings	5th (2022)	Quarter-finals (2022)
U.S. Open Cup (1 berth)	(United States Soccer Federation) Houston Dynamo FC	2023 U.S. Open Cup champions	8th (2019)	Semi-finals (2008)

1. United States (USA): As the Columbus Crew had already qualified based on their regular season performance, this Supporters-Shield ranking berth was awarded to the next-best team that had not already qualified, New England Revolution.

== Draw ==
The draw for the tournament was held on 13 December 2023. Teams were seeded based on their CONCACAF club ranking as of 11 December 2023. This ranking formula replaced the CONCACAF club index which was used in past editions. Eight teams – the five receiving byes and the top-three ranked teams entering in the first round – were directly assigned positions in the bracket based on their club ranking. The remaining nineteen teams were divided into two pots and then randomly drawn into positions.

=== Entering in the Round of 16 ===
Seed	Team	Ranking points
1	(Mexican Football Federation) Pachuca	1207
2	(United States Soccer Federation) Columbus Crew	1203
3	(United States Soccer Federation) Inter Miami CF	1182
4	(Costa Rican Football Federation) Alajuelense	1145
5	(Surinamese Football Association) Robinhood	1040

=== Entering in Round One ===
Seeded teams
Seed	Team	Ranking points
1	(Mexican Football Federation) América	1254
2	(Mexican Football Federation) Monterrey	1243
3	(Mexican Football Federation) Tigres UANL	1235

Pot 1
Team	Ranking points
(United States Soccer Federation) Philadelphia Union	1214
(Mexican Football Federation) Toluca	1212
(Mexican Football Federation) Guadalajara	1205
(United States Soccer Federation) Orlando City SC	1200
(United States Soccer Federation) Nashville SC	1191
(United States Soccer Federation) FC Cincinnati	1189
(United States Soccer Federation) New England Revolution	1179
(United States Soccer Federation) Houston Dynamo FC	1178

Pot 2
Team	Ranking points
(Canadian Soccer Association) Vancouver Whitecaps FC	1170
(Costa Rican Football Federation) Saprissa	1150
(United States Soccer Federation) St. Louis City SC	1144
(Costa Rican Football Federation) Herediano	1129
(National Football Federation of Guatemala) Comunicaciones	1122
(Panamanian Football Federation) Independiente	1117
(Canadian Soccer Association) Cavalry FC	1115
(Canadian Soccer Association) Forge FC	1111
(Nicaraguan Football Federation) Real Estelí	1071
(Dominican Football Federation) Moca	1029
(Jamaica Football Federation) Cavalier	1028

== Schedule ==
The competition was scheduled as follows.

Round	First leg	Second leg
Round one	6–8 and 20–22 February	13–15 and 27–29 February
Round of 16	5–7 March	12–14 March
Quarter-finals	2–3 April	9–10 April
Semi-finals	23–24 April	30 April – 1 May
Final	1 June at Estadio Hidalgo, Pachuca	

Times are EST or EDT, (Note: EST (UTC−5) for dates up to 7 March 2024 (Round one and first legs of Round of 16), and EDT (UTC−4) for dates thereafter.) as listed by CONCACAF (local times, if different, are in parentheses).

== Bracket ==
Round one
(Panamanian Football Federation) Independiente	0	0	0
(United States Soccer Federation) New England Revolution	1	3	4
(Canadian Soccer Association) Forge FC	1	1	2
(Mexican Football Federation) Guadalajara	3	2	5
(Nicaraguan Football Federation) Real Estelí	2	0	2
(Mexican Football Federation) América	1	2	3
(Costa Rican Football Federation) Herediano (a)	1	3	4
(Mexican Football Federation) Toluca	2	2	4
(Costa Rican Football Federation) Saprissa	2	3	5
(United States Soccer Federation) Philadelphia Union (a.e.t.)	3	3	6
(United States Soccer Federation) St. Louis City SC	2	0	2
(United States Soccer Federation) Houston Dynamo FC (a)	1	1	2
(Canadian Soccer Association) Cavalry FC	0	1	1
(United States Soccer Federation) Orlando City SC	3	3	6
(Canadian Soccer Association) Vancouver Whitecaps FC	1	0	1
(Mexican Football Federation) Tigres UANL	1	3	4
(Dominican Football Federation) Moca	0	0	0
(United States Soccer Federation) Nashville SC	3	4	7
(Jamaica Football Federation) Cavalier	0	0	0
(United States Soccer Federation) FC Cincinnati	2	4	6
(National Football Federation of Guatemala) Comunicaciones	1	0	1
(Mexican Football Federation) Monterrey	4	3	7

Round of 16
(United States Soccer Federation) New England Revolution	4	1	5
(Costa Rican Football Federation) Alajuelense	0	1	1
(Mexican Football Federation) Guadalajara	0	3	3
(Mexican Football Federation) América	3	2	5
(Costa Rican Football Federation) Herediano	2	1	3
(Surinamese Football Association) Robinhood	0	1	1
(United States Soccer Federation) Philadelphia Union	0	0	0
(Mexican Football Federation) Pachuca	0	6	6
(United States Soccer Federation) Houston Dynamo FC	0	1	1
(United States Soccer Federation) Columbus Crew	1	1	2
(United States Soccer Federation) Orlando City SC	0	2	2
(Mexican Football Federation) Tigres UANL	0	4	4
(United States Soccer Federation) Nashville SC	2	1	3
(United States Soccer Federation) Inter Miami CF	2	3	5
(United States Soccer Federation) FC Cincinnati	0	1	1
(Mexican Football Federation) Monterrey	1	2	3

Quarter-finals
(United States Soccer Federation) New England Revolution	0	2	2
(Mexican Football Federation) América	4	5	9
(Costa Rican Football Federation) Herediano	0	1	1
(Mexican Football Federation) Pachuca	5	2	7
(United States Soccer Federation) Columbus Crew (p)	1	1	2 (4)
(Mexican Football Federation) Tigres UANL	1	1	2 (3)
(United States Soccer Federation) Inter Miami CF	1	1	2
(Mexican Football Federation) Monterrey	2	3	5

Semi-finals
(Mexican Football Federation) América	1	1	2
(Mexican Football Federation) Pachuca	1	2	3
(United States Soccer Federation) Columbus Crew	2	3	5
(Mexican Football Federation) Monterrey	1	1	2

Final
1 June – Pachuca
(Mexican Football Federation) Pachuca	3
(United States Soccer Federation) Columbus Crew	0

== Round one ==
=== Summary ===
The first legs were played on 6 and 7 February (for Group 1) and 20, 21, and 22 February (for Group 2), and the second legs were played on 13, 14, and 15 February (for Group 1) and 27, 28, and 29 February 2024 (for Group 2).

Team 1	Agg.	Team 2	1st leg	2nd leg
Saprissa (Costa Rica)	5–6	(United States) Philadelphia Union	2–3	3–3 (a.e.t.)
Herediano (Costa Rica)	4–4 (a)	(Mexico) Toluca	1–2	3–2
Real Estelí (Nicaragua)	2–3	(Mexico) América	2–1	0–2
Forge FC (Canada)	2–5	(Mexico) Guadalajara	1–3	1–2
Independiente (Panama)	0–4	(United States) New England Revolution	0–1	0–3
St. Louis City SC (United States)	2–2 (a)	(United States) Houston Dynamo FC	2–1	0–1
Vancouver Whitecaps FC (Canada)	1–4	(Mexico) Tigres UANL	1–1	0–3
Cavalry FC (Canada)	1–6	(United States) Orlando City SC	0–3	1–3
Comunicaciones (Guatemala)	1–7	(Mexico) Monterrey	1–4	0–3
Cavalier (Jamaica)	0–6	(United States) FC Cincinnati	0–2	0–4
Moca (Dominican Republic)	0–7	(United States) Nashville SC	0–3	0–4

=== Matches ===
20 February 2024
22:00 (21:00 UTC−06:00)

Saprissa (Costa Rican Football Federation)	2–3	(United States Soccer Federation) Philadelphia Union
Glesnes 28' (o.g.); Taylor 90'	Report	Carranza 55', 76', 79'

Estadio Ricardo Saprissa Aymá, San Juan de Tibás
Attendance: 15,955
Referee: Víctor Cáceres Hernández (Mexico)
27 February 2024
20:15

Philadelphia Union (United States Soccer Federation)	3–3 (a.e.t.)	(Costa Rican Football Federation) Saprissa
Carranza 17'; Sullivan 26'; Uhre 94'	Report	Paradela 14' (pen.); Madrigal 28'; Torres 62'

Subaru Park, Chester
Attendance: 18,513
Referee: Selvin Brown (Honduras)

Philadelphia Union won 6–5 on aggregate.

7 February 2024
18:00 (17:00 UTC−06:00)

Herediano (Costa Rican Football Federation)	1–2	(Mexican Football Federation) Toluca
D. Vega 88'	Report	Pereira 16'; Morales 57'

Estadio Alejandro Morera Soto, Alajuela
Attendance: 3,372
Referee: Pierre-Luc Lauzière (Canada)
15 February 2024
20:00 (19:00 UTC−06:00)

Toluca (Mexican Football Federation)	2–3	(Costa Rican Football Federation) Herediano
Isaís 5'; Angulo 45'	Report	Rojas 57'; Rodríguez 62'; Canales 84'

Estadio Nemesio Díez, Toluca
Attendance: 18,875
Referee: Armando Villarreal (United States)

4–4 on aggregate. Herediano won on away goals.

6 February 2024
22:00 (21:00 UTC−06:00)

Real Estelí (Nicaraguan Football Federation)	2–1	(Mexican Football Federation) América
Bonilla 7' (pen.); Fletes 47'	Report	Quiñones 90+1'

Estadio Independencia, Estelí
Attendance: 4,858
Referee: Drew Fischer (Canada)
14 February 2024
22:15 (21:15 UTC−06:00)

América (Mexican Football Federation)	2–0	(Nicaraguan Football Federation) Real Estelí
Rodríguez 18'; Zendejas 54'	Report

Estadio Ciudad de los Deportes, Mexico City
Attendance: 18,123
Referee: Ismail Elfath (United States)

América won 3–2 on aggregate.

7 February 2024
20:00

Forge FC (Canadian Soccer Association)	1–3	(Mexican Football Federation) Guadalajara
Campbell 31'	Report	Cowell 26', 63'; Marín 45+1'

Tim Hortons Field, Hamilton
Attendance: 11,513
Referee: Víctor Rivas (United States)
13 February 2024
22:00 (21:00 UTC−06:00)

Guadalajara (Mexican Football Federation)	2–1	(Canadian Soccer Association) Forge FC
Gutiérrez 8'; Castillo 62'	Report	Tavernier 90+3'

Estadio Akron, Zapopan
Attendance: 25,059
Referee: Mario Escobar (Guatemala)

Guadalajara won 5–2 on aggregate.

21 February 2024
20:00

Independiente (Panamanian Football Federation)	0–1	(United States Soccer Federation) New England Revolution
	Report	Chancalay 54'

Estadio Universitario, Penonomé
Attendance: 1,107
Referee: Walter López (Guatemala)
29 February 2024
20:15

New England Revolution (United States Soccer Federation)	3–0	(Panamanian Football Federation) Independiente
N. Gil 21'; Chancalay 58'; Kaye 90+3'	Report

Gillette Stadium, Foxborough
Attendance: 5,943
Referee: Ismael Cornejo (El Salvador)

New England Revolution won 4–0 on aggregate.

20 February 2024
20:00 (19:00 UTC−06:00)

St. Louis City SC (United States Soccer Federation)	2–1	(United States Soccer Federation) Houston Dynamo FC
Parker 61'; Kijima 90+1'	Report	Kowalczyk 72'

CityPark, St. Louis
Attendance: 20,900
Referee: Adonai Escobedo (Mexico)
27 February 2024
22:30 (21:30 UTC−06:00)

Houston Dynamo FC (United States Soccer Federation)	1–0	(United States Soccer Federation) St. Louis City SC
Sviatchenko 60'	Report

Shell Energy Stadium, Houston
Attendance: 5,007
Referee: Marco Ortíz (Mexico)

2–2 on aggregate. Houston Dynamo FC won on away goals.

7 February 2024
22:00 (19:00 UTC−08:00)

Vancouver Whitecaps FC (Canadian Soccer Association)	1–1	(Mexican Football Federation) Tigres UANL
Kreilach 32'	Report	Gignac 88'

Starlight Stadium, Langford (Note: Due to scheduling conflicts, the Vancouver Whitecaps could not host the match at their usual home stadium of BC Place.)
Attendance: 5,763
Referee: Juan Gabriel Calderón (Costa Rica)
14 February 2024
20:00 (19:00 UTC−06:00)

Tigres UANL (Mexican Football Federation)	3–0	(Canadian Soccer Association) Vancouver Whitecaps FC
Quiñones 51'; Herrera 85'; Vigón 90+1'	Report

Estadio Universitario, San Nicolás de los Garza
Attendance: 24,988
Referee: Saíd Martínez (Honduras)

Tigres UANL won 4–1 on aggregate.

21 February 2024
22:00 (19:00 UTC−08:00)

Cavalry FC (Canadian Soccer Association)	0–3	(United States Soccer Federation) Orlando City SC
	Report	McGuire 21'; Torres 38', 76'

Starlight Stadium, Langford (Note: Due to expected winter weather issues in Calgary, Cavalry FC played their first round match in Langford, British Columbia.)
Attendance: 2,484
Referee: Juan Gabriel Calderón (Costa Rica)
27 February 2024
18:00

Orlando City SC (United States Soccer Federation)	3–1	(Canadian Soccer Association) Cavalry FC
Lodeiro 48'; Enrique 71'; Smith 88'	Report	Bevan 64'

Inter&Co Stadium, Orlando
Attendance: 5,141
Referee: Fernando Guerrero (Mexico)

Orlando City SC won 6–1 on aggregate.

6 February 2024
20:00 (19:00 UTC−06:00)

Comunicaciones (National Football Federation of Guatemala)	1–4	(Mexican Football Federation) Monterrey
Mejía 29'	Report	Berterame 22'; A. González 51'; Gallardo 71'; R. Aguirre 85'

Estadio Doroteo Guamuch Flores, Guatemala City
Attendance: 11,118
Referee: Selvin Brown (Honduras)
15 February 2024
22:15 (21:15 UTC−06:00)

Monterrey (Mexican Football Federation)	3–0	(National Football Federation of Guatemala) Comunicaciones
Moreno 10'; Corona 31'; Vázquez 79'	Report

Estadio BBVA, Guadalupe
Attendance: 21,307
Referee: Iván Barton (El Salvador)

Monterrey won 7–1 on aggregate.

22 February 2024
21:00

Cavalier (Jamaica Football Federation)	0–2	(United States Soccer Federation) FC Cincinnati
	Report	Santos 45+5'; Pinto 87'

National Stadium, Kingston
Attendance: 650
Referee: César Ramos (Mexico)
28 February 2024
19:00

FC Cincinnati (United States Soccer Federation)	4–0	(Jamaica Football Federation) Cavalier
Powell 19'; Boupendza 34'; Foster 71'; Valenzuela 78'	Report

TQL Stadium, Cincinnati
Attendance: 15,307
Referee: Keylor Herrera (Costa Rica)

FC Cincinnati won 6–0 on aggregate.

22 February 2024
19:00 (20:00 UTC−04:00)

Moca (Dominican Football Federation)	0–3	(United States Soccer Federation) Nashville SC
	Report	Mukhtar 12'; Surridge 25'; Boyd 75'

Estadio Cibao FC, Santiago
Referee: Bryan López (Guatemala)
28 February 2024
21:15 (20:15 UTC−06:00)

Nashville SC (United States Soccer Federation)	4–0	(Dominican Football Federation) Moca
Gaines 13'; Ajago 38', 53'; Shaffelburg 45'	Report

Geodis Park, Nashville
Attendance: 6,289
Referee: Oshane Nation (Jamaica)

Nashville SC won 7–0 on aggregate.

== Round of 16 ==
=== Summary ===
The first legs were played on 5, 6, and 7 March, and the second legs were played on 12, 13, and 14 March 2024.

Team 1	Agg.	Team 2	1st leg	2nd leg
Philadelphia Union (United States)	0–6	(Mexico) Pachuca	0–0	0–6
Herediano (Costa Rica)	3–1	(Suriname) Robinhood	2–0	1–1
Guadalajara (Mexico)	3–5	(Mexico) América	0–3	3–2
New England Revolution (United States)	5–1	(Costa Rica) Alajuelense	4–0	1–1
Houston Dynamo FC (United States)	1–2	(United States) Columbus Crew	0–1	1–1
Orlando City SC (United States)	2–4	(Mexico) Tigres UANL	0–0	2–4
FC Cincinnati (United States)	1–3	(Mexico) Monterrey	0–1	1–2
Nashville SC (United States)	3–5	(United States) Inter Miami CF	2–2	1–3

=== Matches ===
5 March 2024
18:00

Philadelphia Union (United States Soccer Federation)	0–0	(Mexican Football Federation) Pachuca
	Report

Subaru Park, Chester
Attendance: 16,558
Referee: Ismael Cornejo (El Salvador)
12 March 2024
20:15 (18:15 UTC−6)

Pachuca (Mexican Football Federation)	6–0	(United States Soccer Federation) Philadelphia Union
Rondón 7' (pen.), 45+6', 53'; Suárez 57'; Idrissi 63'; Bautista 85'	Report

Estadio Hidalgo, Pachuca
Attendance: 19,658
Referee: Bryan López (Guatemala)

Pachuca won 6–0 on aggregate.

5 March 2024
17:00 (16:00 UTC−4)

Herediano (Costa Rican Football Federation)	2–0	(Surinamese Football Association) Robinhood
Montes 32'; Garza 84'	Report

Estadio Alejandro Morera Soto, Alajuela
Attendance: 3,815
Referee: Fernando Guerrero (Mexico)
13 March 2024
18:00 (19:00 UTC−3)

Robinhood (Surinamese Football Association)	1–1	(Costa Rican Football Federation) Herediano
Tuur 90+4'	Report	Garza 56'

Dr. Ir. Franklin Essed Stadion, Paramaribo
Attendance: 2,000
Referee: Julio Luna (Guatemala)

Herediano won 3–1 on aggregate.

6 March 2024
22:00 (21:00 UTC−6)

Guadalajara (Mexican Football Federation)	0–3	(Mexican Football Federation) América
	Report	Quiñones 15' (pen.); Valdés 70'; Martín 90+4'

Estadio Akron, Zapopan
Attendance: 43,111
Referee: Saíd Martínez (Honduras)
13 March 2024
22:30 (20:30 UTC−6)

América (Mexican Football Federation)	2–3	(Mexican Football Federation) Guadalajara
Mozo 51' (o.g.); Zendejas 60'	Report	Cowell 12'; Marín 32'; Alvarado 63'

Estadio Azteca, Mexico City
Attendance: 59,405
Referee: Mario Escobar (Guatemala)

América won 5–3 on aggregate.

6 March 2024
18:00

New England Revolution (United States Soccer Federation)	4–0	(Costa Rican Football Federation) Alajuelense
Lima 28'; Chancalay 41', 50' (pen.); Bajraktarevic 55'	Report

Gillette Stadium, Foxborough
Attendance: 6,391
Referee: Adonai Escobedo (Mexico)
14 March 2024
20:00 (18:00 UTC−6)

Alajuelense (Costa Rican Football Federation)	1–1	(United States Soccer Federation) New England Revolution
Mora 4'	Report	Vrioni 81'

Estadio Alejandro Morera Soto, Alajuela
Attendance: 7,315
Referee: César Ramos (Mexico)

New England Revolution won 5–1 on aggregate.

6 March 2024
20:00 (19:00 UTC−6)

Houston Dynamo FC (United States Soccer Federation)	0–1	(United States Soccer Federation) Columbus Crew
	Report	Mățan 90+6'

Shell Energy Stadium, Houston
Attendance: 4,379
Referee: Armando Villarreal (United States)
12 March 2024
18:00

Columbus Crew (United States Soccer Federation)	1–1	(United States Soccer Federation) Houston Dynamo FC
Hernández 40'	Report	Dorsey 90' (pen.)

Lower.com Field, Columbus
Attendance: 12,420
Referee: Oshane Nation (Jamaica)

Columbus Crew won 2–1 on aggregate.

5 March 2024
20:00

Orlando City SC (United States Soccer Federation)	0–0	(Mexican Football Federation) Tigres UANL
	Report

Inter&Co Stadium, Orlando
Attendance: 10,098
Referee: Walter López (Guatemala)
12 March 2024
22:30

Tigres UANL (Mexican Football Federation)	4–2	(United States Soccer Federation) Orlando City SC
Flores 13'; Gignac 20' (pen.); Gorriarán 68'; Córdova 81'	Report	Torres 24'; Ojeda 90+1' (pen.)

Estadio Universitario, San Nicolás de los Garza
Attendance: 34,686
Referee: Iván Barton (El Salvador)

Tigres UANL won 4–2 on aggregate.

7 March 2024
19:00

FC Cincinnati (United States Soccer Federation)	0–1	(Mexican Football Federation) Monterrey
	Report	Vázquez 24'

TQL Stadium, Cincinnati
Attendance: 21,175
Referee: Selvin Brown (Honduras)
14 March 2024
22:15 (19:15 UTC−6)

Monterrey (Mexican Football Federation)	2–1	(United States Soccer Federation) FC Cincinnati
Romo 41'; Vázquez 68'	Report	Acosta 47'

Estadio BBVA, Guadalupe
Attendance: 45,221
Referee: Juan Gabriel Calderón (Costa Rica)

Monterrey won 3–1 on aggregate.

7 March 2024
21:00

Nashville SC (United States Soccer Federation)	2–2	(United States Soccer Federation) Inter Miami CF
Shaffelburg 4', 47'	Report	Messi 52'; Suárez 90+5'

Geodis Park, Nashville
Attendance: 30,109
Referee: Marco Ortíz (Mexico)
13 March 2024
20:15

Inter Miami CF (United States Soccer Federation)	3–1	(United States Soccer Federation) Nashville SC
Suárez 8'; Messi 23'; Taylor 63'	Report	Surridge 90+3'

Chase Stadium, Fort Lauderdale
Attendance: 18,143
Referee: Drew Fischer (Canada)

Inter Miami CF won 5–3 on aggregate.

== Quarter-finals ==
In the quarter-finals, the matchups were determined as follows:

- QF1: Winner R16-1 vs. Winner R16-2
- QF2: Winner R16-3 vs. Winner R16-4
- QF3: Winner R16-5 vs. Winner R16-6
- QF4: Winner R16-7 vs. Winner R16-8

Pos	Team	Pld	W	D	L	GF	GA	GD	Pts	Host
1 (QF1)	(Mexican Football Federation) Pachuca	2	1	1	0	6	0	+6	4	Second leg
2 (QF1)	(Costa Rican Football Federation) Herediano	2	1	1	0	3	1	+2	4	First leg
1 (QF2)	(Mexican Football Federation) América	2	1	0	1	5	3	+2	3	Second leg
2 (QF2)	(United States Soccer Federation) New England Revolution	2	1	1	0	5	1	+4	4	First leg
2 (QF3)	(Mexican Football Federation) Tigres UANL	2	1	1	0	4	2	+2	4	Second leg
1 (QF3)	(United States Soccer Federation) Columbus Crew	2	1	1	0	2	1	+1	4	First leg
1 (QF4)	(Mexican Football Federation) Monterrey	2	2	0	0	3	1	+2	6	Second leg
2 (QF4)	(United States Soccer Federation) Inter Miami CF	2	1	1	0	5	3	+2	4	First leg

Source: CONCACAF
Rules for classification: 1) Points; 2) Goal difference; 3) Goals scored; 4) Away goals scored; 5) Wins; 6) Away wins; 7) Disciplinary points (1 point for yellow card, 3 points for indirect red card, 4 points for direct red card, 5 points for yellow card and direct red card); 8) Drawing of lots (Regulations Article 12.9.5).

The quarter-finalists in each tie which had the better performance in previous rounds (excluding round one) hosted the second leg.

=== Summary ===
The first legs were played on 2 and 3 April, and the second legs were played on 9 and 10 April 2024.

Team 1	Agg.	Team 2	1st leg	2nd leg
Herediano (Costa Rica)	1–7	(Mexico) Pachuca	0–5	1–2
New England Revolution (United States)	2–9 (Note: Due to the availability of their stadium, New England Revolution requested to play the first leg at home, followed by the second leg away. This switch request was accepted by CONCACAF and América.)	(Mexico) América	0–4	2–5
Columbus Crew (United States)	2–2 (4–3 p)	(Mexico) Tigres UANL	1–1	1–1 (a.e.t.)
Inter Miami CF (United States)	2–5	(Mexico) Monterrey	1–2	1–3

=== Matches ===
3 April 2024
22:00 (20:00 UTC−6)

Herediano (Costa Rican Football Federation)	0–5	(Mexican Football Federation) Pachuca
		Rondón 3', 16', 68'; Domínguez 55'; Bautista 90'

Estadio Nacional, San José
Attendance: 9,210
Referee: Tori Penso (United States)
10 April 2024
20:15 (18:15 UTC−6)

Pachuca (Mexican Football Federation)	2–1	(Costa Rican Football Federation) Herediano
González 47'; Rondón 59'	Report	Rubio 62'

Estadio Hidalgo, Pachuca
Attendance: 19,083
Referee: Oshane Nation (Jamaica)

Pachuca won 7–1 on aggregate.

2 April 2024
21:00

New England Revolution (United States Soccer Federation)	0–4	(Mexican Football Federation) América
	Report	Martín 16'; Zendejas 25'; Calderón 64'; Rodríguez 90+1'

Gillette Stadium, Foxborough
Attendance: 11,978
Referee: Ismael Cornejo (El Salvador)
9 April 2024
22:36 (20:36 UTC−6)

América (Mexican Football Federation)	5–2	(United States Soccer Federation) New England Revolution
Valdés 21'; Quiñones 34'; Martín 45+4'; Zendejas 57'; Rodríguez 76' (pen.)	Report	Vrioni 65', 90+2'

Estadio Azteca, Mexico City
Attendance: 18,636
Referee: Saíd Martínez (Honduras)

América won 9–2 on aggregate.

2 April 2024
21:00 (Note: The Columbus Crew v Tigres UANL match, originally scheduled to be played at 19:00, was postponed to 21:00 due to thunderstorms in the area.)

Columbus Crew (United States Soccer Federation)	1–1	(Mexican Football Federation) Tigres UANL
Rossi 43'	Report	Gignac 18'

Lower.com Field, Columbus
Attendance: 8,587
Referee: Selvin Brown (Honduras)
9 April 2024
20:36 (18:36 UTC−6)

Tigres UANL (Mexican Football Federation)	1–1 (a.e.t.)	(United States Soccer Federation) Columbus Crew
Gignac 3'	Report	Rossi 59'
Penalties
Gignac (penalty missed); Pizarro (penalty missed); Herrera (penalty scored); Córdova (penalty scored); Angulo (penalty scored)	3–4	(penalty scored) Rossi; (penalty scored) Russell-Rowe; (penalty scored) Mățan; (penalty missed) Hernández; (penalty scored) Arfsten

Estadio Universitario, San Nicolás de los Garza
Attendance: 36,611
Referee: Bryan López (Guatemala)

2–2 on aggregate. Columbus Crew won 4–3 on penalties.

3 April 2024
20:00

Inter Miami CF (United States Soccer Federation)	1–2	(Mexican Football Federation) Monterrey
Avilés 19'	Report	Meza 69'; Rodríguez 89'

Chase Stadium, Fort Lauderdale
Referee: Walter López (Guatemala)
10 April 2024
22:30 (20:30 UTC−6)

Monterrey (Mexican Football Federation)	3–1	(United States Soccer Federation) Inter Miami CF
Vázquez 31'; Berterame 58'; Gallardo 64'	Report	Gómez 85'

Estadio BBVA, Guadalupe
Attendance: 53,032
Referee: Iván Barton (El Salvador)

Monterrey won 5–2 on aggregate.

== Semi-finals ==
In the semi-finals, the matchups were determined as follows:

- SF1: Winner QF1 vs. Winner QF2
- SF2: Winner QF3 vs. Winner QF4

The semi-finalists in each tie which had the better performance in previous rounds (excluding round one) hosted the second leg.

Pos	Team	Pld	W	D	L	GF	GA	GD	Pts	Host
1 (SF1)	(Mexican Football Federation) Pachuca	4	3	1	0	13	1	+12	10	Second leg
2 (SF1)	(Mexican Football Federation) América	4	3	0	1	14	5	+9	9	First leg
2 (SF2)	(Mexican Football Federation) Monterrey	4	4	0	0	8	3	+5	12	Second leg
1 (SF2)	(United States Soccer Federation) Columbus Crew	4	1	3	0	4	3	+1	6	First leg

Source: CONCACAF
Rules for classification: 1) Points; 2) Goal difference; 3) Goals scored; 4) Away goals scored; 5) Wins; 6) Away wins; 7) Disciplinary points (1 point for yellow card, 3 points for indirect red card, 4 points for direct red card, 5 points for yellow card and direct red card); 8) Drawing of lots (Regulations Article 12.9.5).

=== Summary ===
The first legs were played on 23 and 24 April, and the second legs were played on 30 April and 1 May 2024.

Team 1	Agg.	Team 2	1st leg	2nd leg
América (Mexico)	2–3	(Mexico) Pachuca	1–1	1–2
Columbus Crew (United States)	5–2	(Mexico) Monterrey	2–1	3–1

=== Matches ===
23 April 2024
22:15 (20:15 UTC−6)

América (Mexican Football Federation)	1–1	(Mexican Football Federation) Pachuca
Zendejas 12'	Report	Micolta 40'

Estadio Azteca, Mexico City
Attendance: 40,882
Referee: Ismail Elfath (United States)
30 April 2024
21:15 (19:15 UTC−6)

Pachuca (Mexican Football Federation)	2–1	(Mexican Football Federation) América
E. Rodríguez 12'; Deossa 14'	Report	Martín 23'

Estadio Hidalgo, Pachuca
Attendance: 16,768
Referee: Drew Fischer (Canada)

Pachuca won 3–2 on aggregate.

24 April 2024
20:15

Columbus Crew (United States Soccer Federation)	2–1	(Mexican Football Federation) Monterrey
Hernández 25'; Russell-Rowe 73'	Report	Meza 58'

Lower.com Field, Columbus
Attendance: 17,145
Referee: Oshane Nation (Jamaica)
1 May 2024
22:15 (20:15 UTC−6)

Monterrey (Mexican Football Federation)	1–3	(United States Soccer Federation) Columbus Crew
Cheberko 11' (o.g.)	Report	Morris 45+4'; Rossi 49'; Russell-Rowe 89'

Estadio BBVA, Guadalupe
Referee: Juan Gabriel Calderón (Costa Rica)

Columbus Crew won 5–2 on aggregate.

== Final ==
In the final (winners of SF1 vs. winners of SF2), the finalist which had the better performances in previous rounds (excluding round one), Pachuca, hosted the single-leg match.

==== Standings ====
Pos	Team	Pld	W	D	L	GF	GA	GD	Pts	Final
1	(Mexican Football Federation) Pachuca (H)	6	4	2	0	16	3	+13	14	Host
2	(United States Soccer Federation) Columbus Crew	6	3	3	0	9	5	+4	12	

Updated to match(es) played on 30 April 2024. Source: CONCACAF
Rules for classification: 1) Points; 2) Goal difference; 3) Goals scored; 4) Away goals scored; 5) Wins; 6) Away wins; 7) Disciplinary points (1 point for yellow card, 3 points for indirect red card, 4 points for direct red card, 5 points for yellow card and direct red card); 8) Drawing of lots (Regulations Article 12.9.5).
(H) Hosts

Due to 2024 Mexican general election taking place that day, CONCACAF announced that if a Mexican team were to host the final, CONCACAF would move the match and/or venue to another date.

1 June 2024 (Note: The final match (originally scheduled for 2 June 2024) was moved back to 1 June 2024 due to a Mexican team hosting the final due to the 2024 Mexican general election taking place that day.)
21:15 (19:15 UTC−6)

Pachuca (Mexican Football Federation)	3–0	(United States Soccer Federation) Columbus Crew
Rondón 12', 67'; E. Rodríguez 32'	Report

Estadio Hidalgo, Pachuca
Referee: Iván Barton (El Salvador)

== Statistics ==
=== Top goalscorers ===
Rank	Player	Team	Goals
1	(Venezuela) Salomón Rondón	(Mexican Football Federation) Pachuca	9
2	(United States) Alejandro Zendejas	(Mexican Football Federation) América	5
3	(Argentina) Julián Carranza	(United States Soccer Federation) Philadelphia Union	4
3	(Argentina) Tomás Chancalay	(United States Soccer Federation) New England Revolution	4
3	(France) André-Pierre Gignac	(Mexican Football Federation) Tigres UANL	4
3	(Mexico) Henry Martín	(Mexican Football Federation) América	4
3	(United States) Brandon Vázquez	(Mexican Football Federation) Monterrey	4
8	(United States) Cade Cowell	(Mexican Football Federation) Guadalajara	3
8	(Mexico) Julián Quiñones	(Mexican Football Federation) América	3
8	(Uruguay) Diego Rossi	(United States Soccer Federation) Columbus Crew	3
8	(Canada) Jacob Shaffelburg	(United States Soccer Federation) Nashville SC	3
8	(Uruguay) Facundo Torres	(United States Soccer Federation) Orlando City SC	3
8	(Albania) Giacomo Vrioni	(United States Soccer Federation) New England Revolution	3

=== Best XI ===
CONCACAF selected the following players as the team of the tournament.

Pos.	Player	Team
GK	(United States) Patrick Schulte	(United States Soccer Federation) Columbus Crew
DF	(Chile) Igor Lichnovsky	(Mexican Football Federation) América
DF	(Ukraine) Yevhen Cheberko	(United States Soccer Federation) Columbus Crew
DF	(Mexico) Bryan Gonzalez	(Mexican Football Federation) Pachuca
MF	(Colombia) Nelson Deossa	(Mexican Football Federation) Pachuca
MF	(Mexico) Emilio Rodríguez	(Mexican Football Federation) Pachuca
MF	(Chile) Diego Valdés	(Mexican Football Federation) América
MF	(Uruguay) Diego Rossi	(United States Soccer Federation) Columbus Crew
FW	(United States) Alejandro Zendejas	(Mexican Football Federation) América
FW	(Venezuela) Salomón Rondón	(Mexican Football Federation) Pachuca
FW	(Morocco) Oussama Idrissi	(Mexican Football Federation) Pachuca

=== Awards ===
Award	Player	Team	Ref.
Best Player Award	(Venezuela) Salomón Rondón	(Mexican Football Federation) Pachuca	
Best Goalkeeper Award	(United States) Patrick Schulte	(United States Soccer Federation) Columbus Crew	
Young Player Award	(Mexico) Emilio Rodríguez	(Mexican Football Federation) Pachuca	
Top Scorer Award	(Venezuela) Salomón Rondón	(Mexican Football Federation) Pachuca	
Fair Play Award	—N/a	(United States Soccer Federation) Columbus Crew	

== See also ==
- 2024 Leagues Cup
- 2024 CONCACAF Central American Cup
- 2024 CONCACAF Caribbean Cup
- 2024 CFU Club Shield
- 2024–25 CONCACAF W Champions Cup
