= C.F. Pachuca =

Association football club in Mexico

Pachuca
- Full name: Club de Fútbol Pachuca
- Nickname: Tuzos (Gophers)
- Short name: PAC, CFP
- Founded: November 1, 1892; 134 years ago (as Pachuca Football Club); 1960; 66 years ago (refounded as Club de Fútbol Pachuca)
- Stadium: Estadio Hidalgo
- Capacity: 25,922
- Owner: Grupo Pachuca
- President: Armando Martínez Patiño
- Manager: Benjamín Mora
- League: Liga MX
- Apertura 2026: Regular phase: 8th of 18; Final phase: TBD
- Website: tuzos.com.mx
Home colours	Away colours	Third colours

Club de Fútbol Pachuca is a professional football club based in Pachuca, Hidalgo. The club competes in Liga MX, the highest level of Mexican football, and plays its home matches at Estadio Hidalgo. Founded in 1892 as Pachuca Football Club by workers from the mining company Real del Monte y Pachuca, which had mostly British immigrants (Cornish diaspora). In 1895, the club was renamed as Pachuca Athletic Club, and adopted its current name in 1960 when the current franchise was established. Nicknamed Tuzos due to the history and mining heritage of the club and the city.

In domestic competitions, CF Pachuca has won seven Liga MX titles. In international competitions, the club has won six CONCACAF Champions Cup titles, one CONMEBOL Sudamericana, one FIFA Challenger Cup, one FIFA Derby of the Americas, and one North American SuperLiga. The club also reached the 2024 FIFA Intercontinental Cup final, and finished as third place in the 2017 FIFA Club World Cup.

It was a founding member of the Liga Mexicana de Football Amateur Association, a local amateur league of clubs near and around Mexico City and the first amateur football league created in the country.

== History ==
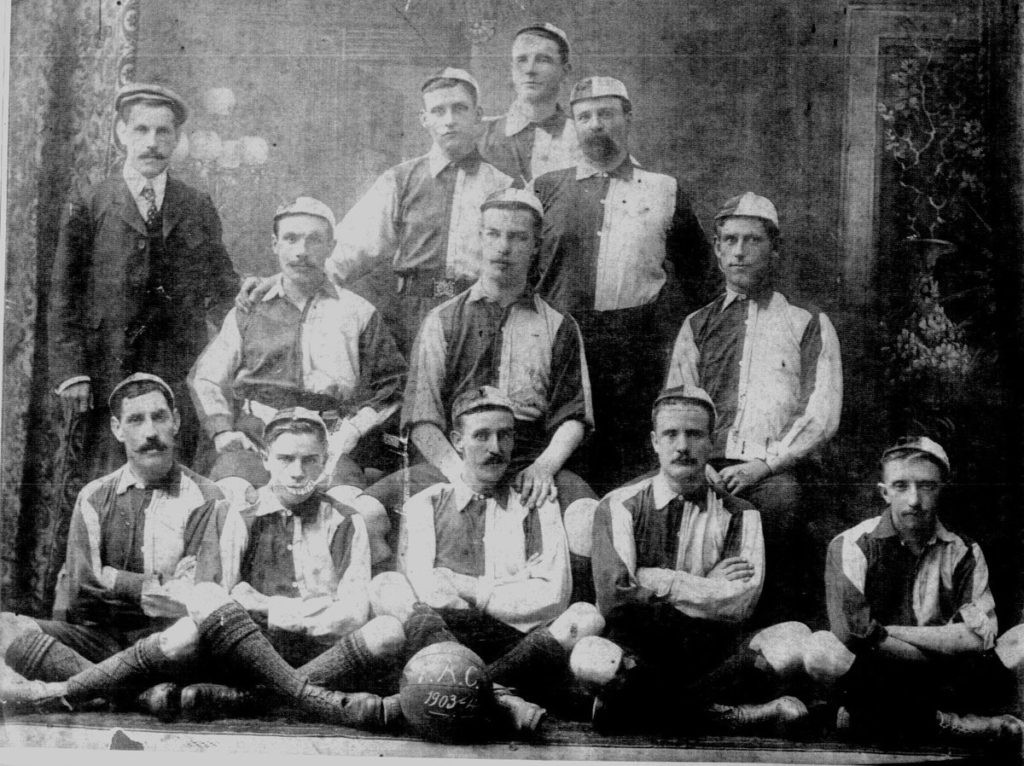
Pachuca Athletic Club in 1903

=== Pachuca FC (1892–1895) ===
British miners from Cornwall in the south-west of Britain, working for the Compañía Real del Monte y Pachuca (English: Real del Monte and Pachuca Company), practiced football only as an unorganized hobby during their free time while working at the mines. Francis Rule and Alfred C. Crowle were the men who promoted the creation of the very first football club in Mexico, which was named Pachuca Football Club founded on November 1, 1892. The game rapidly spread in popularity and other clubs were soon established in surrounding states, including Orizaba, Puebla and Mexico City.

=== Pachuca AC (1895–1922, 1950–1952) ===
Pachuca FC merged with Pachuca Cricket Club and Velasco Cricket Club, for which it changed its name to Pachuca Athletic Club in 1895, because football and other sports could be practiced at the club.

In 1902, Pachuca AC joined Orizaba AC, Reforma AC, British Club and Mexico Cricket Club to found the Liga Mexicana de Football Amateur Association. The club's first match was a 3–3 draw at home against Reforma AC, on November 1, 1902. Pachuca AC won its first amateur title in the 1904–05 season and also won the Copa Tower twice (1907–08 and 1911–12). In the 1908 season, a Mexican born player, David Islas appeared for the first time in the ranks of the team. In 1915, most of the players on the team were Mexicans, winning two more amateur league titles (1917–18 and 1919–20), under the British coach Alfred C. Crowle.

Between 1920 and 1921, the mining company entered into crisis due to the effects of the Mexican Revolution, which is why the most of its players moved to Mexico City. Pachuca was invited to participate in the Torneo Centenario 1921 (English: 1921 Centennial Tournament) and also in the Copa Covadonga 1922, which was its last participation in the amateur era and later the club was dissolved.

The club was dissolved for 28 years (1922–1950) until its return in 1950 as one of the founding members of the Segunda División de México, however the club was dissolved for the second time in 1952 until its refounding in 1960.

=== CF Pachuca (1960–present) ===
After Pachuca AC was dissolved for 8 years (1952–1960), the club was refounded in 1960 with a new name and new representative colors, which is the current franchise named Club de Fútbol Pachuca. It also changed its traditional colors for its home kit from black and white to a new blue and white combination that has remained to the present.

In the 1966–67 season, the club was crowned champions of the Segunda División de México and was promoted to the Primera División de México. The 1967–68 season was the club's first season in the Primera División de México, and the team finished 12th out of 16 teams. Their first match was a 1–3 loss against Necaxa at the Estadio Azteca, where Armando Cuervo became the club's first scorer in the top professional division. The club's first victory in the Primera División de México was on July 16, 1967, beating Monterrey 2–1 at home. Pachuca remained in the Primera División until the 1972–73 season, in which the team was relegated for the first time, after losing the relegation playoff.

The "Tuzos" would have to wait 19 years before being able to return to the Primera División, after winning the Segunda División for second time in the 1991–92 season, but the following year they were relegated for the second time, at the end of the 1992–93 season. The Primera División "A" de México is created in 1994, later named Ascenso MX. In the 1995–96 season, the team becomes champions of the Primera A for first time and is promoted to the Primera División. However, once again they would only participate in the Primera División for one season (1996–97 season) and were relegated again to the Primera A, that was the third and last relegation in the club's history.

After the FMF splits the calendar into two half-length tournaments, Pachuca won the Invierno 1997 tournament and becomes champions of the Primera A for second time. Also won the Campeón de Ascenso 1997–1998, beating Tigrillos UANL and were promoted to the Primera División for fourth time and the last promotion in the club's history. Pachuca returns to the Primera División in 1998, and since then it has remained in the top level division. In the 1998–99 season, the team breaks its own bad streak with a draw against Atlante in the Estadio Azteca in front of 30,000 people and avoids returning to the Primera División A.

=== CF Pachuca's golden era (1999–2010) ===
The golden era of the club as its most winning years are known, in which Pachuca won most of its titles, winning eleven titles in 11 years (five league titles, four CONCACAF titles, one Copa Sudamericana and one North American SuperLiga). It started in the Invierno 1999 tournament, Pachuca under the coach Javier Aguirre were crowned champions of the Primera División de México for the first time in its history. On December 19, 1999, Pachuca defeated Cruz Azul 3–2 on aggregate in the finals, winning the second leg at the Estadio Azul 1–0 with a golden goal scored by the striker Alejandro Glaria in the 92nd minute of extra time.

After winning the league title, the club was invited to participate in the 2000 Copa Merconorte, which was its first international participation and the first club's appearance in a CONMEBOL competition. The club finished second in their group with 9 points (3 wins and 3 losses), and failed to qualify for the knockout stages. Pachuca also participated for the first time in the top continental club competition of CONCACAF, finishing in third place in the 2000 CONCACAF Champions' Cup.

Pachuca again under Javier Aguirre, are finalists in the Verano 2001 tournament, losing to Santos Laguna at the Estadio Corona in Torreón, Coahuila. During that season, the team lost one of its biggest figures when Pablo Hernán Gómez was killed in a car accident on 29 January 2001. By the end of 2001, Javier Aguirre is chosen to coach the Mexico national team for the 2002 FIFA World Cup, and the club selects Alfredo Tena to be the new coach. Tena leads the team to the Invierno 2001 finals where they faced Tigres UANL at the Estadio Universitario de la UANL and winning their second league title.

On September 18, 2002, Pachuca won their first international title after being crowned champions in the 2002 CONCACAF Champions' Cup, beating Monarcas Morelia 1–0 in the final and winning another trophy at the Estadio Azul (currently Estadio Ciudad de los Deportes).

In the Apertura 2003, the club won another league trophy, again against Tigres UANL, and again in their stadium. This time, the coach was Víctor Manuel Vucetich. Between 2004 and 2005, the team failed to make the liguilla during two consecutive tournaments. President Jesús Martínez, however, vowed that the team would return to be among the headliners of the Primera División. As a result, Pachuca won the Clausura 2006, beating Club San Luis 1–0 on aggregate with a penalty goal scored by the striker Richard Nuñez, after having an exceptional season which saw the club top the general standings table. It was the first time that Pachuca won the league title by playing the return match in its home stadium.

==== Copa Sudamericana 2006 ====
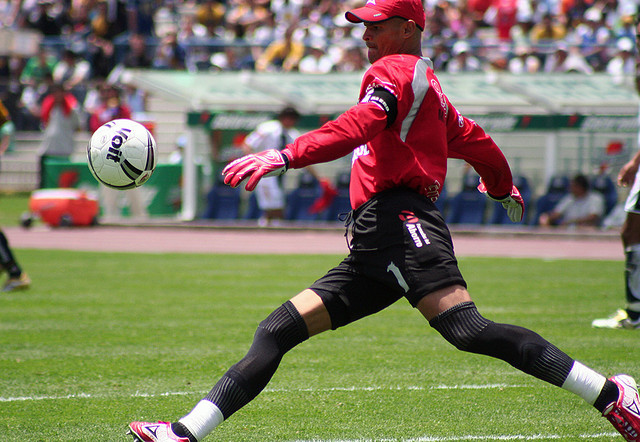
Goalkeeper Miguel Calero was a key player in the 2006 Copa Sudamericana title

After winning the Clausura 2006, Pachuca qualified for the 2006 Copa Sudamericana. Their first match was a 2–1 loss in the round of 16, against Tolima in Ibagué, but in the second leg they had a resounding 5–1 victory at home and qualified for the next round. In the quarterfinals, they faced Lanus, where they had an excellent 3–0 victory in Argentina, before drawing 2–2 in Mexico. In the semifinal they face Club Atlético Paranaense, who has been the defending finalist the previous year. The first leg was played in Curitiba, where Pachuca won 1–0 with a goal from Damián Álvarez in the 86th minute. In the second leg, Pachuca won 4–1, and advanced to the final with an resounding 5–1 on aggregate. In the finals they were matched up with Colo-Colo, one of Chile's most historic and popular clubs; the first leg in Mexico finished in a draw 1–1. In the second leg at Estadio Nacional on December 14, the Chilean club scored first, but Pachuca scored two second half goals to turn the game around and win the title for the first time in its history, 3–2 on aggregate and becoming the first Mexican and CONCACAF club to win a CONMEBOL-exclusive continental club competition and also became the only club in the world to win an official title from a confederation outside its own.

With the Clausura 2006 title, Pachuca qualified for the 2007 CONCACAF Champions' Cup, where they disposed of W Connection and D.C. United, before defeating Guadalajara (7–6 on penalties) in the final after a 2–2 draw on aggregate on April 25, 2007.

On May 27, Pachuca won their 5th league title in the Clausura 2007, beating América 3–2 on aggregate; winning this title meant Pachuca had won four trophies in the past 15 months, two league trophies (2006 and 2007), and two international trophies (2006 Copa Sudamericana and the 2007 CONCACAF Champions Cup). By winning the league title Pachuca qualified to the 2008 CONCACAF Champions' Cup in a bid to defend their title, which they did successfully by defeating Saprissa 3–2 on aggregate, and later secured a berth for the 2008 FIFA Club World Cup, where they were knocked out by 2008 Copa Libertadores champions L.D.U. Quito after losing 2–0.

On July 31, 2007, Pachuca entered into a club-to-club partnership with the Colorado Rapids of the MLS. The alliance included a home-and-home annual series between the clubs, an exchange of best business practices, and the establishment of the Tuzos Soccer Academy at Dick's Sporting Goods Park, which was officially launched on October 1, 2007. The move established the Rapids as Pachuca's official partner club in the United States, in a move designed for promotion of both on field development, player exchanges, and business incentives for both clubs on either side of the border.

Pachuca won the 2007 North American SuperLiga in August, becoming the first North American subregional champions of a competition between clubs from MLS and Liga MX. Pachuca won the trophy defeating LA Galaxy (4–3 on penalties), after a 1–1 draw. CONCACAF named Pachuca as the 2007 Team of the Year for winning five titles in 17 months (Clausura 2006, Copa Sudamericana 2006, 2007 CONCACAF Champions Cup, Clausura 2007, and 2007 North American SuperLiga). With the 2007 CONCACAF title, Pachuca claimed a spot in the 2007 FIFA Club World Cup, where they had a disappointing performance, being knocked out by their first rival in the tournament, Étoile Sportive du Sahel (CAF champions).

Pachuca were CONCACAF champions for the fourth time, winning the 2009–10 CONCACAF Champions League and defeating Cruz Azul on away goals (2–2), with a goal scored in the 93rd minute of added time, and secured a berth for the 2010 FIFA Club World Cup.

=== The following years ===
After 9 years without winning the league title, Pachuca won its sixth title on May 29, in the Clausura 2016 tournament, beating Monterrey 2–1 on aggregate, with the winning goal scored in the 93rd minute of added time. The following year, Pachuca were CONCACAF champions for the fifth time, defeating Tigres UANL 2–1 on aggregate in the 2016–17 CONCACAF Champions League. With this victory, they secured a spot in the 2017 FIFA Club World Cup, where they had a respectable performance and achieving third place, defeating Al Jazira 4–1. Six years later, Pachuca won its seventh league title on 30 October, in the Apertura 2022 tournament, beating Toluca in the finals (8–2 on aggregate), and becoming the team with the most goals scored in a Liga MX/Primera División finals.

Pachuca won the 2024 CONCACAF Champions Cup final for the sixth time, after beating Columbus Crew 3–0 at home, and obtaining their qualification for the first edition of the FIFA Intercontinental Cup and also for the 2025 FIFA Club World Cup.

==== 2024 FIFA Intercontinental Cup ====
Pachuca was the first Mexican and CONCACAF representative for the 2024 FIFA Intercontinental Cup, in which it won the FIFA Derby of the Americas, defeating Botafogo 3–0, and later winning the FIFA Challenger Cup defeating Al Ahly (6–5 on penalties) after a 0–0 draw, becoming the first Mexican and CONCACAF club to win an international title directly organized by FIFA. They also finished runners-up in the FIFA Intercontinental Cup, losing to Real Madrid.

== Crest and colors ==
The club's crest has its two traditional colors (blue and white), in its center is the Monumental Clock of Pachuca, which is the representative monument of the city, it was built in commemoration of the centenary of the Independence of Mexico and inaugurated on September 15, 1910.

Originally the representative colors used by the club were black and white, during its participation in the Liga Mexicana Amateur de Football Association (1902–1920) until the first dissolution of the club in 1922, and also in its return as a founding member of the Segunda División de México in 1950 until the second dissolution of the club in 1952. Since the club's refounding in 1960, it also changed its traditional representative colors to blue and white, which remains to this day. Alternative colors that are commonly used are black, orange and different shades of blue. The black, orange and white combination was used for the first time in the Apertura 2006 and became the club's traditional away colors, because those were the colors of the away kit with which Pachuca won the 2006 Copa Sudamericana beating Colo-Colo in Chile.

== Kits ==
=== Historical kits ===
1902 First kit 1967–68 Debut in the Primera División Invierno 1999 Invierno 2001 2002 CONCACAF Champions Cup Apertura 2003 Clausura 2006	2006 Copa Sudamericana 2007 CONCACAF Champions Cup and Clausura 2007 2007 North American SuperLiga 2008 CONCACAF Champions Cup 2009–10 CONCACAF Champions League Clausura 2016	2016–17 CONCACAF Champions League Apertura 2022 2024 CONCACAF Champions Cup 2024 FIFA Derby of the Americas 2024 FIFA Challenger Cup

== Stadium ==
The first football field used by the club in the amateur league was the Campo del Ferrocarril de La Maestranza, where a factory and workshops of the Compañia Real del Monte y Pachuca were located behind the city's old railway station.

After the club's return in 1950 to participate in the first season of the Segunda División de México, the club played at Estadio Margarito Ramírez which was a small football field owned by a railwayman.

After the club was refounded in 1960, they moved to the Estadio Revolución Mexicana with a capacity of just over 3,000 seats and inaugurated on 14 December 1958. It was the home of Pachuca from 1960 to 1993 (except in the 1986–87 season), and winning two promotions to the Primera División (1967 and 1992).

Pachuca played at Estadio 10 de Diciembre in the 1986–87 season of the Segunda División, because its stadium was banned due to riots that occurred in the final match of the previous season.

From 1993 to the present, CF Pachuca's home is the Estadio Hidalgo with a capacity of 25,922 seats and inaugurated on 14 February 1993. This stadium was the place where Pachuca has had the most successful period in its history since its last promotion in 1998. The club has been crowned champions eight times at home (three Liga MX titles and five CONCACAF titles).

== Personnel ==
=== Management ===
Position	Staff
President	(Mexico) Armando Martínez Patiño
Vice-president	(Mexico) Martín Peláez
Director of football	(Argentina) Alfredo Altieri
Coordinator of football	(Mexico) Alan Calleja
Director of academy	(Mexico) Eugenio Villazón

=== Coaching staff ===
Position	Staff
Manager	(Mexico) Benjamín Mora
Assistant managers	(Mexico) Alejandro Domínguez (Canada) (Mexico) Isidro Sánchez
Goalkeeper trainer	(Mexico) Víctor Verónica
Physical trainer	(Mexico) Salvador Ureña
Fitness trainer	(Uruguay) (Italy) Mauricio Marchetti
Physiotherapist	(Mexico) Carlos Cóccaro
Doctor	(Mexico) Fernando Márquez

== Players ==
==== First-team squad ====
As of 23 September 2026

Note: Flags indicate national team as defined under FIFA eligibility rules; some limited exceptions apply. Players may hold more than one non-FIFA nationality.

No.	Pos.	Nation	Player
2	DF	ARG	Sergio Barreto
4	DF	BRA	Eduardo Bauermann
6	DF	MEX	Mauricio Isais
7	MF	MEX	Rodolfo Pizarro (on loan from Juárez)
8	MF	MEX	Alexéi Domínguez
9	FW	PAR	Adrián Alcaraz
11	MF	MAR	Oussama Idrissi
12	MF	MEX	Sebastián Santos (on loan from León)
13	DF	MEX	Jorge Berlanga
14	DF	MEX	Carlos Sánchez
15	DF	MEX	Francisco Venegas (on loan from Querétaro)

No.	Pos.	Nation	Player
16	MF	COL	Christian Rivera
19	FW	MEX	Illian Hernández
21	FW	ARG	Nicolás Vallejo (on loan from León)
23	FW	VEN	Salomón Rondón
25	GK	MEX	Carlos Moreno
26	MF	MEX	Alan Bautista
28	MF	COL	Andrés Arroyo (on loan from Fortaleza)
29	MF	BRA	Kenedy
30	MF	MEX	Lenin Rodríguez
31	GK	MEX	José Eulogio
32	DF	LBN	Pedro Budib

==== Youth squad ====
Note: Flags indicate national team as defined under FIFA eligibility rules; some limited exceptions apply. Players may hold more than one non-FIFA nationality.

No.	Pos.	Nation	Player
183	DF	ECU	Andrés Micolta
187	MF	MEX	Gael Álvarez
206	DF	MEX	Thomas Contreras

No.	Pos.	Nation	Player
207	FW	MEX	Ian Zavala
211	FW	MEX	Cristóbal Hernández
221	FW	MEX	Ulises Martínez

==== Out on loan ====
Note: Flags indicate national team as defined under FIFA eligibility rules; some limited exceptions apply. Players may hold more than one non-FIFA nationality.

No.	Pos.	Nation	Player
—	DF	MEX	Cristóbal Alfaro (at Atlante)
—	MF	MEX	Jesús Brígido (at UdeG)
—	MF	MEX	Owen González (at Necaxa)
—	MF	MEX	Jesús Hernández (at Tlaxcala)
—	MF	MEX	Sergio Hernández (at UdeG)
—	MF	MEX	Alexis Macías (at UAT Premier)
—	MF	MEX	Pedro Pedraza (at Necaxa)

No.	Pos.	Nation	Player
—	MF	MEX	Danilo Rincón (at UAT Premier)
—	MF	MEX	Emilio Rodríguez (at Necaxa)
—	MF	MEX	Juan Sigala (at Juárez)
—	FW	MEX	Ari Contreras (at Atlante)
—	FW	COL	Santiago Londoño (at León)
—	FW	MEX	Luis Puente (at Atlante)

== Honours ==
Domestic
Type	Competition	Titles	Seasons	Runners-up	Source
Top level FMF	Liga MX	7	Inv–1999, Inv–2001, Ape–2003, Cla–2006, Cla–2007, Cla–2016, Ape–2022	Ver–2001, Cla–2009, Cla–2014, Cla–2022	
Top level FMF	Copa MX	0	—	Ape–2017	
Top level FMF	Campeón de Campeones	0	—	2004, 2006, 2016, 2023	
Lower levels FMF	Primera División 'A'	2	1995–96, Inv–1997	1994–95	
Lower levels FMF	Campeón de Ascenso	1	1998	—	
Lower levels FMF	Segunda División	2	1966–67, 1991–92	1984–85, 1985–86, 1990–91	
Lower levels FMF	Copa México Segunda División	2	1963–64, 1965–66	—	
Lower levels FMF	Campeón de Campeones Segunda División	0	—	1966, 1967	
International
Type	Competition	Titles	Seasons	Runners-up	Source
Intercontinental FIFA	FIFA Intercontinental Cup	0	—	2024	
Intercontinental FIFA	FIFA Challenger Cup	1^{s}	2024	—	
Intercontinental FIFA	FIFA Derby of the Americas	1^{s}	2024	—	
Continental CONCACAF	CONCACAF Champions Cup	6	2002, 2007, 2008, 2009–10, 2016–17, 2024	—	
Continental CONMEBOL	CONMEBOL Sudamericana	1	2006	—	
Continental CONMEBOL	CONMEBOL Recopa	0	—	2007	
Regional North America USSF–FMF	North American SuperLiga	1^{s}	2007	—	

Notes

- record
- ^{s} shared record

== See also ==
- C.F. Pachuca Reserves and Academy
- C.F. Pachuca (women)
- C.F. Pachuca Premier
