= Andrés Micolta =

Ecuadorian footballer (born 1999)

Personal information
- Full name: Norman Andrés Micolta Arroyo
- Date of birth: 6 June 1999 (age 27)
- Place of birth: Esmeraldas, Ecuador
- Height: 1.92 m (6 ft 4 in)
- Position: Centre-back

Team information
- Current team: Pachuca
- Number: 183

Youth career
- 2018–2019: Técnico Universitario

Senior career*
Years	Team	Apps	(Gls)
2020–2021	Rio Branco-ES	3	(0)
2021	Castelo	4	(0)
2022–2023	El Nacional	36	(5)
2024–	Pachuca	17	(0)

International career^{‡}
2024–	Ecuador	1	(0)
- * Club domestic league appearances and goals as of 18:47, 21 February 2025 (UTC) ‡ National team caps and goals as of 12 June 2024

Norman Andrés Micolta Arroyo (born 6 June 1999) is an Ecuadorian professional footballer who plays as a centre-back for Liga MX club Pachuca and the Ecuador national team.

== Club career ==
Micolta started his career with Rio Branco, and later went to Castelo, both in Espírito Santo, Brazil.

In 2022, he signed for Ecuadorian Serie B club El Nacional, winning the title and achieving promotion to Serie A in his first season. In the 2023 season, he played in the qualifying stages of the Copa Libertadores, scoring his first goal in continental competition in a 3–1 home win against Nacional Potosí of Bolivia. He left El Nacional at the end of 2023.

On 14 December 2023, Liga MX club C.F. Pachuca announced the signing of Micolta as a free agent, signing a contract until 2027. He was part of the side that won the 2024 CONCACAF Champions Cup, playing the whole game as Pachuca beat Columbus Crew 3–0.

== International career ==
Micolta made his debut for the Ecuador national team on 12 June 2024 in a friendly against Bolivia at the Subaru Park in Chester, United States. He substituted Joel Ordóñez in the 86th minute as Ecuador won 3–1.

== Career statistics ==
=== Club ===
As of 18 May 2024

Appearances and goals by club, season and competition
Club	Season	League			Cup (Note: Appearance(s) in Copa Ecuador)		Continental (Note: Appearance(s) in Copa Libertadores and CONCACAF Champions Cup)		Other (Note: Appearance(s) in Leagues Cup and FIFA Intercontinental Cup)		Total	
Club	Season	Division	Apps	Goals	Apps	Goals	Apps	Goals	Apps	Goals	Apps	Goals
El Nacional	2022	Serie B	13	2	7	0	–		–		20	2
El Nacional	2023	Serie A	23	3	–		4	1	–		27	3
El Nacional	Total		36	5	7	0	4	1	0	0	47	6
Pachuca	2023–24	Liga MX	9	0	–		2	0	–		11	0
Pachuca	2024–25	Liga MX	8	0	–		5	1	5	0	18	1
Pachuca	Total		17	0	0	0	7	1	5	0	29	1
Career total			53	5	7	0	11	2	5	0	76	7

=== International ===
As of match played 12 June 2024

Appearances and goals by national team and year
National team	Year	Apps	Goals
Ecuador	2024	1	0
Total		1	0

== Honours ==
El Nacional

- Ecuadorian Serie B: 2022

Pachuca

- CONCACAF Champions Cup: 2024
