= Emilio Rodríguez (footballer) =

Mexican footballer (born 2003)

Personal information
- Full name: Miguel Emilio Rodríguez Macías
- Date of birth: 21 April 2003 (age 23)
- Place of birth: Querétaro, Querétaro, Mexico
- Height: 1.75 m (5 ft 9 in)
- Position: Winger

Team information
- Current team: Necaxa (on loan from Pachuca)
- Number: 99

Senior career*
Years	Team	Apps	(Gls)
2023–	Pachuca	44	(3)
2024	→ Celta Fortuna (loan)	10	(2)
2025–2026	→ León (loan)	21	(1)
2026–	→ Necaxa (loan)	16	(1)

International career^{‡}
2024–	Mexico U23	7	(1)
- * Club domestic league appearances and goals as of 6 November 2026 ‡ National team caps and goals as of 9 September 2024

Miguel Emilio Rodríguez Macías (born 21 April 2003) is a Mexican footballer who plays as a winger for Liga MX club Necaxa, on loan from Pachuca.

== Club career ==
He is a native of Querétaro, Mexico. Rodríguez joined the youth academy of Liga MX side Pachuca at the age of thirteen.

Rodríguez started his career with Liga MX club Pachuca. In 2024, he signed for Spanish side Celta Fortuna on loan with an option to buy.

On 21 July 2026, Rodríguez was loaned to León and on 25 December, he was loaned to Necaxa. However, since he was not allowed to play or three teams in a football year, he remained six more months with León and in June 2026, he finally joined Necaxa.

== International career ==
Rodríguez was called up by Ricardo Cadena to participate with the Mexico under-23 side to participate at the 2024 edition of the Maurice Revello Tournament.

== Style of play ==
Rodríguez mainly operates as a winger. He has operated as a left-back while playing for Mexican side Pachuca.

== Career statistics ==
=== Club ===
As of match played on 6 November 2026

Appearances and goals by club, season and competition
Club	Season	League			Cup		Continental		Other		Total	
Club	Season	Division	Apps	Goals	Apps	Goals	Apps	Goals	Apps	Goals	Apps	Goals
Pachuca	2022–23	Liga MX	—		1 (Note: Appearance in Campeón de Campeones)	0	—		—		1	0
Pachuca	2023–24	Liga MX	34	2	—		7 (Note: Appearances in CONCACAF Champions Cup)	2	1 (Note: Appearances in Leagues Cup)	0	42	4
Pachuca	2024–25	Liga MX	10	1	—		—		—		10	1
Pachuca	Total		44	3	1	0	7	2	1	0	53	5
Celta Fortuna (loan)	2024–25	Primera Federación	10	2	—		—		—		10	2
León (loan)	2025–26	Liga MX	21	1	—		—		3	0	21	1
Necaxa	2026–27	Liga MX	16	1	—		—		2	0	18	1
Career total			91	7	1	0	7	2	6	0	105	9

== Honours ==
Pachuca

- CONCACAF Champions Cup: 2024
- FIFA Derby of the Americas: 2024
- FIFA Challenger Cup: 2024
- FIFA Intercontinental Cup runner-up: 2024

Individual

- CONCACAF Champions Cup Best Young Player: 2024
- CONCACAF Champions Cup Best XI: 2024
