= List of Liga Deportiva Universitaria de Quito seasons =

List of seasons of Liga Deportiva Universitaria de Quito

Liga Deportiva Universitaria de Quito is an Ecuadorian professional football club based in Quito. Founded in 1930, the club has competed primarily in the top tier of Ecuadorian football, Ecuadorian Serie A, and is one of the most successful teams in the country. This article lists the club’s league performance by season.

== Seasons ==
Liga Deportiva Universitaria de Quito has won multiple Ecuadorian Serie A titles, with its first championship coming in 1969 and later successes including titles in 1974, 1975, 1990, 1998, 1999, 2003, 2007, 2010, 2018, 2019, 2023 and 2024. The club has also experienced relegation, most notably in the late 1970s and again in 2000, but returned to the top flight shortly afterwards on both occasions. In international competitions, LDU Quito achieved its greatest success by winning the Copa Libertadores in 2008 and the Copa Sudamericana in 2009.

Season	League	Position	Notes
1960	Serie A	—	
1968	Serie A	4th	
1969	Serie A	1st	Champions
1970	Serie A	4th	
1971	Serie A	6th	
1972	Serie A	7th	
1973	Segunda Categoría	1st	Promoted
1974	Serie B / Serie A	1st	Champions
1975	Serie A	1st	Champions
1976	Serie A	4th	
1977	Serie A	2nd	Runner-up
1978	Serie A / Serie B	9th	Relegated
1979	Serie A	5th	
1980	Serie A	6th	
1981	Serie A	2nd	Runner-up
1982	Serie A	9th	
1983	Serie A	7th	
1984	Serie A	3rd	
1985	Serie A	9th	
1986	Serie A	8th	
1987	Serie A	6th	
1988	Serie A	3rd	
1989	Serie A	7th	
1990	Serie A	1st	Champions
1991	Serie A	5th	
1992	Serie A	5th	
1993	Serie A	7th	
1994	Serie A	8th	
1995	Serie A	5th	
1996	Serie A	9th	
1997	Serie A	4th	
1998	Serie A	1st	Champions
1999	Serie A	1st	Champions
2000	Serie A	9th	
2001	Serie B	1st	Promoted
2002	Serie A	4th	
2003	Serie A	1st	Champions
2004	Serie A	3rd	
2005	Serie A	—	Apertura champions
2006	Serie A	3rd	
2007	Serie A	1st	Champions
2008	Serie A	2nd	Copa Libertadores winners
2009	Serie A	4th	Copa Sudamericana winners
2010	Serie A	1st	Champions
2011	Serie A	4th	
2012	Serie A	3rd	
2013	Serie A	6th	
2014	Serie A	4th	
2015	Serie A	—	
2016	Serie A	—	
2017	Serie A	—	
2018	Serie A	1st	Champions
2019	Serie A	1st	Champions
2020	Serie A	—	
2021	Serie A	—	
2022	Serie A	—	
2023	Serie A	1st	Champions
2024	Serie A	1st	Champions
2025	Serie A	2nd	Runner-up
