= 1994 Liga Deportiva Universitaria de Quito season =

L.D.U. Quito
1994 season
- President: Mario Zambrano
- Manager: Oscar Zubía (until August); Ernesto Guerra (from August to October); Ramiro Aguirre (from October)
- Stadium: Estadio Olímpico Atahualpa
- Serie A: 8th
- Top goalscorer: Gilson de Souza (15 goals)
Home colours	Away colours

Liga Deportiva Universitaria de Quito's 1994 season was the club's 64th year of existence, the 41st year in professional football, and the 34th in the top level of professional football in Ecuador.

== Kits ==
Supplier: Dide
Sponsor(s): Orangine, Almacenes Rickie

== Squad ==
No.	Pos.	Nation	Player
—	GK	ECU	Liborio Hurtado
—	GK	ECU	Víctor Sánchez
—	DF	ECU	Edgar Arias
—	DF	ECU	Santiago Jácome
—	DF	ECU	Rodney Mantilla
—	DF	ECU	Pablo Marín (captain)
—	DF	ECU	Danilo Samaniego
—	MF	URU	Washington Aires
—	MF	URU	Carlos Berrueta
—	MF	ECU	Robert Burbano
—	MF	ECU	Oswaldo de la Cruz

No.	Pos.	Nation	Player
—	MF	ECU	Héctor González
—	MF	ECU	Luis González
—	MF	ECU	Juan Guamán
—	MF	ECU	Paúl Guevara
—	MF	ECU	Miguel Mina
—	MF	ECU	Luis Pozo
—	FW	BRA	Gilson de Souza
—	FW	ECU	Patricio Hurtado
—	FW	ECU	Jorge Jiménez
—	FW	ECU	Pedro Salvador
—	FW	ECU	Lino Sánchez

== Competitions ==
=== Serie A ===
==== First stage ====
Pos	Team	Pld	W	D	L	GF	GA	GD	Pts	Qualification
1	ESPOLI	22	12	7	3	41	26	+15	31	Qualified to the Liguilla Final
2	El Nacional	22	12	6	4	39	24	+15	30	Qualified to the Liguilla Final
3	Emelec	22	12	4	6	37	16	+21	28	
4	Deportivo Quito	22	10	6	6	40	26	+14	26	
5	L.D.U. Portoviejo	22	8	8	6	30	28	+2	24	
6	Aucas	22	8	6	8	29	23	+6	22	
7	Barcelona	22	7	7	8	18	24	−6	21	
8	L.D.U. Quito	22	7	6	9	36	26	+10	20	
9	Green Cross	22	6	6	10	27	31	−4	18	
10	Delfín	22	5	6	11	16	43	−27	16	
11	Depotivo Cuenca	22	4	7	11	21	41	−20	15	
12	Valdez	22	5	3	14	23	49	−26	13	

===== Results =====
Home \ Away	SDA	BSC	DSC	CDC	SDQ	EN	CSE	CDE	GC	LDP	LDQ	VSC
Aucas											1–1	
Barcelona											2–1	
Delfín											1–1	
Depotivo Cuenca											3–2	
Deportivo Quito											3–1	
El Nacional											2–1	
Emelec											2–0	
ESPOLI											1–0	
Green Cross											1–0	
L.D.U. Portoviejo											1–1	
L.D.U. Quito	1–1	3–1	3–0	5–1	2–2	4–0	2–1	0–0	3–0	1–2		4–0
Valdez											1–0	

Source: RSSSF
Legend: Blue = home team win; Yellow = draw; Red = away team win.

==== Second stage ====
Group 1
Pos	Team	Pld	W	D	L	GF	GA	GD	Pts	Qualification
1	ESPOLI	12	8	2	2	22	16	+6	18	Qualified to the Liguilla Final
2	Emelec	12	7	2	3	28	13	+15	16	
3	Deportivo Quito	12	6	4	2	24	13	+11	16	
4	L.D.U. Quito	12	4	2	6	26	27	−1	10	
5	L.D.U. Portoviejo	12	3	4	5	14	22	−8	10	
6	Delfín	12	3	3	6	13	24	−11	9	

Note: Intergroups match (LDU Quito - D. Cuenca)

===== Results =====
Home \ Away	DSC	CDC	SDQ	CSE	CDE	LDP	LDQ
Delfín							3–3
Deportivo Cuenca							2–3
Deportivo Quito							1–1
Emelec							6–2
ESPOLI							3–2
L.D.U. Portoviejo							5–2
L.D.U. Quito	4–1	4–0	1–4	0–1	0–1	4–0	

Source: RSSSF
Legend: Blue = home team win; Yellow = draw; Red = away team win.
