= 1993 Liga Deportiva Universitaria de Quito season =

L.D.U. Quito
1993 season
- President: Mario Zambrano
- Manager: Hernán Vaca (until May); Ángel Brunell (from June to October); Oscar Zubía (from November)
- Stadium: Estadio Olímpico Atahualpa
- Serie A: 7th
- Top goalscorer: Diego Herrera (18 goals)
Home colours	Away colours

Liga Deportiva Universitaria de Quito's 1993 season was the club's 63rd year of existence, the 40th year in professional football, and the 33rd in the top level of professional football in Ecuador.

LDU Quito finished seventh in the final league table.

== Kits ==
Supplier: Dide
Sponsor(s): Orangine, Casa Cobo

== Squad ==
No.	Pos.	Nation	Player
—	GK	ECU	Víctor Sánchez
—	GK	ECU	César Vallejo
—	DF	ECU	Edgar Arias
—	DF	URU	Milton Gómez
—	DF	ECU	Santiago Jácome
—	DF	ECU	Rodney Mantilla
—	DF	ECU	Pablo Marín
—	DF	ECU	Janz Ortega
—	DF	ECU	Danilo Samaniego
—	DF	ECU	Eduardo Zambrano
—	MF	URU	Washington Aires
—	MF	ECU	Robert Burbano
—	MF	ECU	Paúl Carrera

No.	Pos.	Nation	Player
—	MF	ECU	Oswaldo de la Cruz
—	MF	ECU	Héctor González
—	MF	ECU	Luis González
—	MF	ECU	Juan Guamán
—	MF	PAN	Javier Henríquez
—	MF	ECU	Pietro Marsetti (captain)
—	MF	ECU	Miguel Mina
—	MF	ECU	Luis Pozo
—	MF	ECU	Luis Valdiviezo
—	FW	ECU	Ermen Benítez
—	FW	ECU	Diego Herrera
—	FW	ECU	Pedro Salvador
—	FW	ECU	Lino Sánchez

== Competitions ==
=== Serie A ===
==== First stage ====
Group 1
Pos	Team	Pld	W	D	L	GF	GA	GD	Pts	Qualification
1	Emelec	10	6	2	2	20	7	+13	14	Qualified to the Liguilla Final
2	Delfín	10	6	2	2	12	7	+5	14	Qualified to the Liguilla Final
3	El Nacional	10	5	1	4	12	8	+4	11	
4	L.D.U. Quito	10	2	5	3	13	16	−3	9	
5	Técnico Universitario	10	2	3	5	10	16	−6	7	
6	Valdez	10	1	3	6	7	20	−13	5	

===== Results =====
Home \ Away	DSC	EN	CSE	LDQ	TU	VSC
Delfín				1–0		
El Nacional				0–1		
Emelec				5–2		
L.D.U. Quito	1–1	0–1	1–1		2–1	2–2
Técnico Universitario				2–2		
Valdez				2–2		

Source: RSSSF
Legend: Blue = home team win; Yellow = draw; Red = away team win.

==== Second stage ====
Group 1
Pos	Team	Pld	W	D	L	GF	GA	GD	Pts	Qualification
1	Deportivo Cuenca	10	5	4	1	12	6	+6	14	Qualified to the Liguilla Final
2	L.D.U. Quito	10	5	2	3	18	14	+4	12	Qualified to the Liguilla Final
3	Emelec	10	3	5	2	11	9	+2	11	
4	El Nacional	10	4	1	5	12	10	+2	9	
5	Delfín	10	3	3	4	14	16	−2	9	
6	Santos	10	1	3	6	5	17	−12	5	

===== Results =====
Home \ Away	DSC	CDC	EN	CSE	LDQ	SFC
Delfín					1–1	
Deportivo Cuenca					3–2	
El Nacional					3–2	
Emelec					2–2	
L.D.U. Quito	1–0	1–0	1–2	1–0		3–0
Santos					3–4	

Source: RSSSF
Legend: Blue = home team win; Yellow = draw; Red = away team win.

==== Liguilla Final ====
Pos	Team	Pld	W	D	L	GF	GA	GD	Pts	Qualification
1	Emelec	14	9	1	4	27	9	+18	19	Champions and Qualified to the 1994 Copa Libertadores
2	Barcelona	14	8	2	4	20	10	+10	18	
3	El Nacional	14	8	2	4	22	13	+9	18	
4	Green Cross	14	5	3	6	20	21	−1	13	
5	Delfín	14	6	1	7	21	27	−6	13	
6	Deportivo Cuenca	14	5	3	6	14	23	−9	13	
7	L.D.U. Quito	14	4	3	7	19	24	−5	11	
8	Deportivo Quito	14	2	3	9	13	29	−16	7	

===== Results =====
Home \ Away	BSC	DSC	CDC	SDQ	EN	CSE	GC	LDQ
Barcelona								4–0
Delfín								2–1
Deportivo Cuenca								3–1
Deportivo Quito								1–4
El Nacional								2–1
Emelec								3–0
Green Cross								2–2
L.D.U. Quito	1–0	3–1	0–0	1–2	0–1	3–1	2–2	

Source: RSSSF
Legend: Blue = home team win; Yellow = draw; Red = away team win.
