= 1996 Liga Deportiva Universitaria de Quito season =

LDU Quito
1996 season
- President: Darío Ávila
- Manager: Sócrates (from February to April); Carlos Sevilla (from April to August); Alfredo Encalada (from August to September); Francisco Bertocchi (from September to December)
- Stadium: Estadio Olímpico Atahualpa
- Serie A: 9th
- Top goalscorer: Fabinho Fontes (11 goals)
Home colours	Away colours

Liga Deportiva Universitaria de Quito's 1996 season was the club's 66th year of existence, the 43rd year in professional football, and the 36th in the top level of professional football in Ecuador.

== Kits ==
Supplier: Marathon
Sponsor(s): Cerveza Club

== Squad ==
No.	Pos.	Nation	Player
—	GK	ECU	Marcelo Capirossi
—	GK	ECU	Héctor Chiriboga
—	GK	ECU	Víctor Sánchez
—	DF	PAR	Néstor Benítez
—	DF	ECU	Freddy Bravo
—	DF	ECU	Santiago Jácome
—	MF	ECU	Nixon Carcelén (captain)
—	MF	BRA	Alexandre de Sales
—	MF	ECU	Luis Escalante
—	MF	BRA	Fabinho Fontes
—	MF	ECU	Juan Carlos Garay
—	MF	ECU	Luis González
—	MF	ECU	Juan Guamán
—	MF	ECU	Paúl Guevara

No.	Pos.	Nation	Player
—	MF	ECU	Robert Macías
—	MF	ECU	Miguel Mina
—	MF	PAR	Juan Dilei Ortíz
—	MF	ECU	Luis Pozo
—	MF	ECU	Hjalmar Zambrano
—	FW	BRA	Carlinhos
—	FW	ECU	Diego Herrera
—	FW	ECU	Patricio Hurtado
—	FW	ECU	Pedro Salvador
—	FW	ECU	Lino Sánchez
—	FW	BRA	Arribasao
—	FW	ECU	Patricio Vargas
—	FW	ECU	Leonel Yerovi

== Competitions ==
=== Serie A ===
==== First stage ====
Pos	Team	Pld	W	D	L	GF	GA	GD	Pts	Qualification
1	El Nacional	22	15	5	2	42	16	+26	50	Finals and Qualified to the 1997 Copa Libertadores
2	Emelec	22	14	4	4	50	19	+31	46	
3	Barcelona	22	13	3	6	36	16	+20	42	
4	Deportivo Quito	22	9	8	5	39	26	+13	35	
5	Deportivo Cuenca	22	9	7	6	25	20	+5	34	
6	Olmedo	22	9	4	9	22	27	−5	31	
7	ESPOLI	22	7	8	7	23	26	−3	29	
8	LDU Quito	22	7	4	11	30	32	−2	25	
9	Técnico Universitario	22	7	4	11	25	42	−17	25	
10	Green Cross	22	6	2	14	18	41	−23	20	
11	Aucas	22	3	6	13	16	29	−13	15	
12	L.D.U. Portoviejo	22	4	3	15	21	53	−32	15	

===== Results =====
Home \ Away	SDA	BSC	CDC	SDQ	EN	CSE	CDE	GC	LDP	LDU	CDO	TU
Aucas										1–1		
Barcelona										2–1		
Deportivo Cuenca										1–0		
Deportivo Quito										2–2		
El Nacional										1–0		
Emelec										5–0		
ESPOLI										1–0		
Green Cross										2–0		
L.D.U. Portoviejo										2–4		
LDU Quito	1–0	0–1	0–1	2–2	1–2	4–3	0–0	2–3	2–0		5–0	2–0
Olmedo										3–1		
Técnico Universitario										0–2		

Source: RSSSF
Legend: Blue = home team win; Yellow = draw; Red = away team win.

==== Second stage ====
Group 1

Pos	Team	Pld	W	D	L	GF	GA	GD	Pts	Qualification
1	El Nacional	6	4	0	2	11	5	+6	12	Qualified to the Liguilla Final
2	Olmedo	6	4	0	2	8	6	+2	12	Qualified to the Liguilla Final
3	LDU Quito	6	2	1	3	6	9	−3	7	Qualified to the Liguilla del No Descenso
4	Green Cross	6	1	1	4	5	10	−5	4	Qualified to the Liguilla del No Descenso

===== Results =====
Home \ Away	EN	GC	LDU	CDO
El Nacional			2–0	
Green Cross			0–0	
LDU Quito	0–3	3–1		1–0
Olmedo			3–2	

Source: RSSSF
Legend: Blue = home team win; Yellow = draw; Red = away team win.

==== Liguilla del No Descenso ====
Pos	Team	Pld	W	D	L	GF	GA	GD	Pts	Relegation
1	Técnico Universitario	10	5	2	3	12	10	+2	17	
2	ESPOLI	10	4	5	1	12	11	+1	17	
3	Aucas	10	4	4	2	16	7	+9	14	
4	LDU Quito	10	3	5	2	17	10	+7	14	
5	Green Cross	10	2	1	7	10	20	−10	7	Relegated to the Serie B
6	L.D.U. Portoviejo	10	2	3	5	11	20	−9	6	Relegated to the Serie B

===== Results =====
Home \ Away	SDA	CDE	GC	LDP	LDU	TU
Aucas					0–0	
ESPOLI					2–2	
Green Cross					2–1	
L.D.U. Portoviejo					2–2	
LDU Quito	1–1	0–0	4–1	6–0		1–0
Técnico Universitario					2–0	

Source: RSSSF
Legend: Blue = home team win; Yellow = draw; Red = away team win.
