= 1992 Liga Deportiva Universitaria de Quito season =

L.D.U. Quito
1992 season
- President: Raúl Vaca
- Manager: Oscar Malbernat
- Stadium: Estadio Olímpico Atahualpa
- Serie A: 5th
- Top goalscorer: Fernando Barboza (13 goals)
| Home colours | Away colours |

Liga Deportiva Universitaria de Quito's 1992 season was the club's 62nd year of existence, the 39th year in professional football, and the 32nd in the top level of professional football in Ecuador.

== Kits ==
Sponsor(s): Banco de la Producción, Philips

== Squad ==
| No. | Pos. | Nation | Player |
|---|---|---|---|
| — | GK | ECU | Liborio Hurtado |
| — | GK | ECU | Víctor Sánchez |
| — | DF | ECU | Édison Arias |
| — | DF | ECU | Santiago Jácome |
| — | DF | ECU | Rodney Mantilla |
| — | DF | ECU | Pablo Marín |
| — | DF | ECU | Janz Ortega |
| — | DF | ECU | Danilo Ríos |
| — | DF | ECU | Danilo Samaniego |
| — | DF | ECU | Eduardo Zambrano |

| No. | Pos. | Nation | Player |
|---|---|---|---|
| — | MF | URU | Carlos Berrueta |
| — | MF | ECU | Juan Guamán |
| — | MF | ECU | Pietro Marsetti (captain) |
| — | MF | ECU | Miguel Mina |
| — | MF | ECU | Carlos Páez |
| — | MF | ECU | Luis Pozo |
| — | MF | URU | Luis Alberto Acosta |
| — | FW | URU | Fernando Barboza |
| — | FW | ECU | Diego Herrera |
| — | FW | ECU | Pedro Salvador |

== Competitions ==
=== Serie A ===
==== First stage ====
| Pos | Team | Pld | W | D | L | GF | GA | GD | Pts | Qualification or relegation |
|---|---|---|---|---|---|---|---|---|---|---|
| 1 | Emelec | 22 | 16 | 4 | 2 | 41 | 10 | +31 | 36 | Qualified to the Liguilla Final |
| 2 | El Nacional | 22 | 11 | 8 | 3 | 31 | 14 | +17 | 30 | Qualified to the Liguilla Final |
| 3 | Barcelona | 22 | 12 | 4 | 6 | 42 | 22 | +20 | 28 | |
| 4 | L.D.U. Quito | 22 | 10 | 5 | 7 | 34 | 28 | +6 | 25 | |
| 5 | Deportivo Cuenca | 22 | 10 | 5 | 7 | 30 | 26 | +4 | 25 | |
| 6 | Valdez | 22 | 7 | 7 | 8 | 25 | 23 | +2 | 21 | |
| 7 | Deportivo Quito | 22 | 6 | 9 | 7 | 26 | 31 | −5 | 21 | |
| 8 | Aucas | 22 | 8 | 3 | 11 | 32 | 29 | +3 | 19 | |
| 9 | Green Cross | 22 | 8 | 3 | 11 | 31 | 43 | −12 | 19 | |
| 10 | Delfín | 22 | 3 | 8 | 11 | 20 | 42 | −22 | 14 | |
| 11 | Técnico Universitario | 22 | 3 | 7 | 12 | 10 | 31 | −21 | 13 | |
| 12 | Universidad Católica | 22 | 2 | 9 | 11 | 19 | 42 | −23 | 13 | Relegated to the Serie B |

===== Results =====
| Home \ Away | SDA | BSC | DSC | CDC | SDQ | EN | CSE | GC | LDQ | TU | UC | VSC |
|---|---|---|---|---|---|---|---|---|---|---|---|---|
| Aucas | | | | | | | | | 3–0 | | | |
| Barcelona | | | | | | | | | 3–3 | | | |
| Delfín | | | | | | | | | 2–3 | | | |
| Deportivo Cuenca | | | | | | | | | 1–2 | | | |
| Deportivo Quito | | | | | | | | | 4–3 | | | |
| El Nacional | | | | | | | | | 2–0 | | | |
| Emelec | | | | | | | | | 1–0 | | | |
| Green Cross | | | | | | | | | 1–4 | | | |
| L.D.U. Quito | 1–1 | 0–0 | 4–0 | 4–1 | 1–0 | 1–0 | 0–1 | 3–2 | | 1–1 | 2–0 | 0–1 |
| Técnico Universitario | | | | | | | | | 0–0 | | | |
| Universidad Católica | | | | | | | | | 1–2 | | | |
| Valdez | | | | | | | | | 3–0 | | | |

Source: RSSSF
Legend: Blue = home team win; Yellow = draw; Red = away team win.

==== Second stage ====
Group 2
| Pos | Team | Pld | W | D | L | GF | GA | GD | Pts | Qualification |
|---|---|---|---|---|---|---|---|---|---|---|
| 1 | L.D.U. Quito | 10 | 4 | 4 | 2 | 13 | 9 | +4 | 12 | Qualified to the Liguilla Final |
| 2 | El Nacional | 10 | 5 | 1 | 4 | 17 | 11 | +6 | 11 | |
| 3 | Valdez | 10 | 5 | 1 | 4 | 12 | 11 | +1 | 11 | |
| 4 | Delfín | 10 | 4 | 2 | 4 | 15 | 18 | −3 | 10 | |
| 5 | Aucas | 10 | 3 | 3 | 4 | 7 | 9 | −2 | 9 | |
| 6 | L.D.U. Portoviejo | 10 | 2 | 3 | 5 | 9 | 15 | −6 | 7 | |

===== Results =====
| Home \ Away | SDA | DSC | EN | LDP | LDQ | VSC |
|---|---|---|---|---|---|---|
| Aucas | | | | | 0–0 | |
| Delfín | | | | | 2–2 | |
| El Nacional | | | | | 2–1 | |
| L.D.U. Portoviejo | | | | | 0–0 | |
| L.D.U. Quito | 2–0 | 3–0 | 1–0 | 3–2 | | 1–1 |
| Valdez | | | | | 2–0 | |

Source: RSSSF
Legend: Blue = home team win; Yellow = draw; Red = away team win.

==== Liguilla Final ====
| Pos | Team | Pld | W | D | L | GF | GA | GD | Pts | Qualification |
|---|---|---|---|---|---|---|---|---|---|---|
| 1 | El Nacional | 10 | 5 | 4 | 1 | 16 | 7 | +9 | 15 (Note: Includes Bonus Points earned from the previous rounds: El Nacional, Emelec, Green Cross & LDU QUito (1)) | Qualified to the Finals |
| 2 | Barcelona | 10 | 6 | 3 | 1 | 14 | 7 | +7 | 15 | Qualified to the Finals |
| 3 | Emelec | 10 | 5 | 2 | 3 | 21 | 10 | +11 | 13 | Qualified to the 1993 Copa CONMEBOL |
| 4 | Green Cross | 10 | 2 | 3 | 5 | 8 | 15 | −7 | 8 | |
| 5 | L.D.U. Quito | 10 | 2 | 2 | 6 | 7 | 16 | −9 | 7 | |
| 6 | Deportivo Quito | 10 | 2 | 2 | 6 | 10 | 21 | −11 | 6 | |

===== Results =====
| Home \ Away | BSC | SDQ | EN | CSE | GC | LDQ |
|---|---|---|---|---|---|---|
| Barcelona | | | | | | 3–1 |
| Deportivo Quito | | | | | | 3–0 |
| El Nacional | | | | | | 2–1 |
| Emelec | | | | | | 4–0 |
| Green Cross | | | | | | 1–0 |
| L.D.U. Quito | 0–1 | 2–0 | 0–0 | 2–1 | 1–1 | |

Source: RSSSF
Legend: Blue = home team win; Yellow = draw; Red = away team win.
