= 1989 Liga Deportiva Universitaria de Quito season =

L.D.U. Quito
1989 season
- President: Iván Romero
- Manager: Simo Vilic; Francisco Bertocchi
- Stadium: Estadio Olímpico Atahualpa
- Serie A: 7th
Home colours	Away colours

Liga Deportiva Universitaria de Quito's 1989 season was the club's 59th year of existence, the 36th year in professional football and the 29th in the top level of professional football in Ecuador.

== Kits ==
Sponsor(s): Philips

== Squad ==
No.	Pos.	Nation	Player
—	GK	ECU	Héctor Chiriboga
—	GK	ECU	Patricio Gallardo
—	GK	ECU	Víctor Sánchez
—	DF	ECU	César Mina
—	DF	ECU	Miguel Orletti
—	DF	ARG	Alfredo Riggio
—	DF	ECU	Danilo Ríos
—	DF	ECU	Danilo Samaniego
—	DF	URU	Enrique Saravia
—	DF	ECU	Eduardo Zambrano
—	MF	PER	Julio César Antón
—	MF	ECU	Hernán Castillo

No.	Pos.	Nation	Player
—	MF	ECU	Oswaldo de la Cruz
—	MF	PER	Domingo Farfán
—	MF	ECU	Juan Guamán
—	MF	ECU	May Gutiérrez
—	MF	ECU	Pietro Marsetti (captain)
—	MF	ECU	Carlos Páez
—	MF	ECU	Iván Parra
—	MF	ECU	Luis Pozo
—	MF	ARG	Fernando Saluzzo
—	FW	ECU	Francisco Callejas
—	FW	ECU	Nelson Guerrero
—	FW	ECU	Diego Herrera

== Competitions ==
=== Serie A ===
==== First stage ====
Pos	Team	Pld	W	D	L	GF	GA	GD	Pts	Qualification or relegation
1	El Nacional	22	14	2	6	40	25	+15	30	Qualified to the Liguilla Final
2	Barcelona	22	9	10	3	30	16	+14	28	Qualified to the Liguilla Final
3	Emelec	22	9	8	5	27	22	+5	26	Qualified to the Liguilla Final
4	Deportivo Quito	22	10	5	7	26	16	+10	25	Qualified to the Liguilla Final
5	Macará	22	8	8	6	24	23	+1	24	
6	L.D.U. Quito	22	7	7	8	32	27	+5	21	
7	Aucas	22	8	7	7	22	31	−9	21	
8	Filanbanco	22	7	5	10	31	33	−2	19	
9	Deportivo Cuenca	22	6	7	9	24	31	−7	19	
10	L.D.U. Portoviejo	22	6	6	10	19	31	−12	18	Qualified to the Liguilla del No Descenso
11	Técnico Universitario	22	5	7	10	20	29	−9	17	Qualified to the Liguilla del No Descenso
12	Audaz Octubrino	22	3	8	11	25	36	−11	14	Relegated to the Serie B

===== Results =====
Home \ Away	SDA	AO	BSC	CDC	SDQ	EN	CSE	CDF	LDP	LDQ	MAC	TU
Aucas										1–1		
Audaz Octubrino										1–1		
Barcelona										4–1		
Deportivo Cuenca										3–1		
Deportivo Quito										1–0		
El Nacional										1–1		
Emelec										2–0		
Filanbanco										2–2		
L.D.U. Portoviejo										2–1		
L.D.U. Quito	8–0	1–0	1–1	2–3	1–1	3–1	1–3	1–0	2–0		1–0	0–1
Macará										0–0		
Técnico Universitario										0–3		

Source: RSSSF
Legend: Blue = home team win; Yellow = draw; Red = away team win.

==== Second stage ====
Group 2
Pos	Team	Pld	W	D	L	GF	GA	GD	Pts	Qualification
1	Filanbanco	10	6	1	3	21	14	+7	13	Qualified to the Liguilla Final
2	L.D.U. Quito	10	4	4	2	10	8	+2	12	
3	Deportivo Quito	10	4	3	3	20	8	+12	11	
4	Barcelona	10	3	4	3	9	11	−2	10	
5	Técnico Universitario	10	1	6	3	8	14	−6	8	
6	L.D.U. Portoviejo	10	1	4	5	8	21	−13	6	

===== Results =====
Home \ Away	BSC	SDQ	CDF	LDP	LDQ	TU
Barcelona					2–1	
Deportivo Quito					1–1	
Filanbanco					1–0	
L.D.U. Portoviejo					1–1	
L.D.U. Quito	1–0	1–0	2–1	1–0		1–1
Técnico Universitario					1–1	

Source: RSSSF
Legend: Blue = home team win; Yellow = draw; Red = away team win.
