= 1974 Liga Deportiva Universitaria de Quito season =

L.D.U. Quito
1974 season
- President: Raúl Vaca
- Manager: Leonel Montoya
- Stadium: Estadio Olímpico Atahualpa
- Serie B Serie A: Champions (1st title); Champions (2nd title)
- Top goalscorer: Oscar Zubía (9 goals - Serie B); Jorge Tapia (5 goals - Serie A)
Home colours	Away colours

Liga Deportiva Universitaria de Quito's 1974 season was the club's 44th year of existence, the 21st year in professional football, the 1st in the Serie B and the 14th in the top level of professional football in Ecuador.

== Squad ==
No.	Pos.	Nation	Player
—	GK	ECU	Adolfo Bolaños
—	GK	URU	Walter Maesso
—	DF	URU	Luis De Carlos
—	DF	ECU	Humboldt De La Torre
—	DF	ECU	Luis Garzón
—	DF	ECU	Washington Guevara
—	DF	ECU	Patricio Maldonado
—	DF	ECU	Ramiro Tobar (captain)
—	MF	URU	Juan Carlos Gómez

No.	Pos.	Nation	Player
—	MF	ECU	Juan Ribadeneira
—	MF	ECU	Roberto Sussman
—	MF	ECU	Jorge Tapia
—	FW	ECU	Ramiro Aguirre
—	FW	ECU	José Bucheli
—	FW	ECU	Marco Moreno
—	FW	ECU	Gustavo Tapia
—	FW	ECU	Hernán Vaca
—	FW	URU	Oscar Zubía

== Competitions ==
=== Serie B ===
==== First stage ====
Pos	Team	Pld	W	D	L	GF	GA	GD	Pts	Promotion
1	L.D.U. Quito	14	10	2	2	29	11	+18	22	Champions (1st title) and promoted to the Serie A
2	América de Quito	14	7	2	5	18	16	+2	16	Promoted to the Serie A
3	9 de Octubre	14	5	5	4	30	22	+8	15	
4	Carmen Mora	14	5	4	5	17	18	−1	14	
5	Aucas	14	5	3	6	17	20	−3	13	
6	Olmedo	14	4	4	6	13	20	−7	12	
7	Manta Sport	14	3	4	7	19	25	−6	10	
8	Everest	14	4	2	8	10	11	−1	10	

===== Results =====
Home \ Away	9DO	CDA	SDA	CMO	CDE	LDQ	MSC	CDO
9 de Octubre						0–0		
América de Quito						0–1		
Aucas						0–2		
Carmen Mora						0–1		
Everest						3–1		
L.D.U. Quito	2–1	4–1	3–1	6–1	2–0		3–1	3–1
Manta Sport						1–1		
Olmedo						1–0		

Source: RSSSF
Legend: Blue = home team win; Yellow = draw; Red = away team win.

=== Serie A ===
==== Second stage ====
Pos	Team	Pld	W	D	L	GF	GA	GD	Pts	Qualification
1	El Nacional	14	4	9	1	20	15	+5	17	Qualified to the Finals and 1975 Copa Libertadores
2	L.D.U. Quito	14	5	6	3	16	13	+3	16	Qualified to the Semifinals
3	Barcelona	14	5	5	4	21	20	+1	15	
4	América de Quito	14	5	4	5	24	21	+3	14	
5	Deportivo Cuenca	14	5	3	6	19	15	+4	13	Qualified to the Semifinals
6	Universidad Católica	14	3	7	4	23	24	−1	13	
7	Emelec	14	3	6	5	17	20	−3	12	
8	L.D.U. Portoviejo	14	3	6	5	7	19	−12	12	

===== Results =====
Home \ Away	CDA	BSC	CDC	EN	CSE	LDP	LDQ	UC
América de Quito							2–1	
Barcelona							2–1	
Deportivo Cuenca							2–2	
El Nacional							1–1	
Emelec							1–2	
L.D.U. Portoviejo							0–0	
L.D.U. Quito	3–1	2–0	0–0	0–0	1–0	1–0		1–1
Universidad Católica							3–1	

Source: RSSSF
Legend: Blue = home team win; Yellow = draw; Red = away team win.

==== Semifinals ====
Pos	Team	Pld	W	D	L	GF	GA	GD	Pts	Qualification
1	L.D.U. Quito	2	1	1	0	1	0	+1	3	Qualified to the Finals and 1975 Copa Libertadores
2	Deportivo Cuenca	2	0	1	1	0	1	−1	1	

===== Results =====
Home \ Away	CDC	LDQ
Deportivo Cuenca		0–0
L.D.U. Quito	1–0	

Source: RSSSF
Legend: Blue = home team win; Yellow = draw; Red = away team win.

==== Finals ====
Pos	Team	Pld	W	D	L	GF	GA	GD	Pts	Result
1	L.D.U. Quito	2	1	1	0	2	1	+1	3	Champions (2nd title)
2	El Nacional	2	0	1	1	1	2	−1	1	

===== Results =====
Home \ Away	EN	LDQ
El Nacional		0–0
L.D.U. Quito	2–1	

Source: RSSSF
Legend: Blue = home team win; Yellow = draw; Red = away team win.
