= 2001 Liga Deportiva Universitaria de Quito season =

LDU Quito
2001 season
- President: Darío Ávila
- Manager: Julio Asad
- Stadium: Estadio Casa Blanca
- Serie B: Champion
- Top goalscorer: Óscar Pacheco (27 goals)
Home colours	Away colours

Liga Deportiva Universitaria de Quito's 2001 season was the club's 71st year of existence, the 48th year in professional football, and the 3rd in the second level of professional football in Ecuador.

== Kits ==
Supplier: Umbro
Sponsor(s): Parmalat

== Squad ==
Pos	Nat.	Player	Age	App	Goals
GK	ECU	Omar Estrada	18	3	0
GK	ECU	Víctor Sánchez	31	14	0
GK	ECU	Miguel Santillán	24	18	0
DF	ECU	Mario Chillagana	23	2	0
DF	ECU	Geovanny Cumbicus	20	23	0
DF	ARG	Gabriel Del Valle Medina	30	33	0
DF	ECU	Santiago Jácome	27	33	0
DF	ECU	Jimmy Pineda	18	2	0
DF	ECU	Néicer Reasco	23	17	0
DF	ECU	José Tenorio	22	15	0
DF	ECU	Jorge Vargas	19	6	0
MF	ECU	Paúl Ambrosi	20	17	2
MF	ECU	Nixon Carcelén	31	12	0
MF	ECU	Héctor Ferri	32	14	2
MF	ARG	Lorenzo Frutos	31	20	5
MF	ECU	Dario González	18	2	0
MF	ECU	Luis González	28	24	3
MF	ECU	Paúl Guevara	25	17	2
MF	ECU	Camilo Hurtado	19	18	0
MF	ECU	Leorvelis Mina	20	25	0
MF	ECU	Miguel Ramírez	17	2	0
MF	ARG	Alfredo Vera	28	7	1
FW	ECU	Diego Ayala	21	23	4
FW	ECU	Alberto Capurro	30	32	7
FW	ECU	Gustavo Figueroa	22	17	3
FW	ARG	Alejandro Kenig	31	15	3
FW	ARG	Óscar Pacheco	33	30	27
FW	ECU	Franklin Salas	19	21	1
FW	ECU	Carlos Tenorio	21	22	11

== Competitions ==
=== Serie B ===
==== First stage ====
===== Results =====
Home \ Away	AO	CDC	CDQ	CDS	EP	LDU	SR	TU	UDJ	UC
Audaz Octubrino						2–0				
Deportivo Cuenca						1–3				
Deportivo Quevedo						1–1				
Deportivo Saquisilí						1–1				
Esmeraldas Petrolero						2–2				
LDU Quito	3–1	1–3	3–0	0–3	2–0		1–0	0–0	5–1	2–2
Santa Rita						0–0				
Técnico Universitario						2–2				
Unión Deportiva Juvenil						2–3				
Universidad Católica						1–4				

Source: LDU 2001
Legend: Blue = home team win; Yellow = draw; Red = away team win.

==== Second stage ====
Home \ Away	AO	CDC	CDQ	CDS	EP	LDU	SR	TU	UDJ	UC
Audaz Octubrino						2–1				
Deportivo Cuenca						0–1				
Deportivo Quevedo						0–1				
Deportivo Saquisilí						1–4				
Esmeraldas Petrolero						0–1				
LDU Quito	5–0	0–0	5–0	3–1	2–0		4–3	1–0	3–0	1–1
Santa Rita						1–0				
Técnico Universitario						0–5				
Unión Deportiva Juvenil						0–1				
Universidad Católica						1–4				

Source: LDU 2001
Legend: Blue = home team win; Yellow = draw; Red = away team win.

==== Aggregate table ====
Pos	Team	Pld	W	D	L	GF	GA	GD	Pts	Promotion or relegation
1	LDU Quito	36	22	9	5	75	32	+43	75	Champion and Promoted to the Serie A
2	Deportivo Cuenca	36	18	10	8	63	39	+24	64	Promoted to the Serie A
3	Deportivo Saquisilí	36	18	9	9	66	47	+19	63	
4	Técnico Universitario	36	14	10	12	49	47	+2	52	
5	Santa Rita	36	11	12	13	52	51	+1	45	
6	Esmeraldas Petrolero	36	12	9	15	50	66	−16	45	
7	Universidad Católica	35	10	8	17	61	60	+1	38	
8	Audaz Octubrino	35	10	8	17	33	54	−21	38	
9	UDJ	36	9	10	17	44	60	−16	37	
10	Deportivo Quevedo	36	9	7	20	41	78	−37	34	Relegated to the Segunda Categoría
