= 2002 Liga Deportiva Universitaria de Quito season =

LDU Quito
2002 season
- President: Darío Ávila
- Manager: Julio Asad; Héctor Rivoira
- Stadium: Estadio Casa Blanca
- Serie A: 4th
- Top goalscorer: Carlos Tenorio (17 goals)
Home colours	Away colours

Liga Deportiva Universitaria de Quito's 2002 season was the club's 72nd year of existence, the 49th year in professional football, and the 41st in the top level of professional football in Ecuador.

== Kits ==
Supplier: Umbro
Sponsor(s): Santal, Helados Pigüino, Parmalat, Hyundai

== Squad ==
No.	Pos.	Nation	Player
—	GK	ECU	Jacinto Espinoza (captain)
—	GK	ECU	Omar Estrada
—	GK	ECU	Miguel Santillán
—	DF	ECU	Christian Castro
—	DF	ECU	Geovanny Cumbicus
—	DF	ARG	Gabriel del Valle Medina
—	DF	ECU	Santiago Jácome
—	DF	ARG	Hernán Pages
—	DF	ECU	Néicer Reasco
—	DF	ARG	Fabio Schiavi
—	DF	ECU	José Tenorio
—	DF	ECU	Jorge Vargas
—	MF	ECU	Paúl Ambrosi
—	MF	ECU	Luis Bolaños
—	MF	COL	Álex Escobar

No.	Pos.	Nation	Player
—	MF	ECU	Héctor Ferri
—	MF	ARG	Lorenzo Frutos
—	MF	ECU	Dario González
—	MF	ECU	Luis González
—	MF	ECU	Camilo Hurtado
—	MF	ECU	Leorvelis Mina
—	MF	ECU	Alfonso Obregón
—	MF	ARG	Sebastián Ojeda
—	FW	ECU	Diego Ayala
—	FW	ECU	Patricio Hurtado
—	FW	ECU	Tyrone Macías
—	FW	ARG	Óscar Pacheco
—	FW	ECU	Franklin Salas
—	FW	ECU	Carlos Tenorio
—	FW	ARG	Carlos Yaqué

== Competitions ==
=== Serie A ===
==== First stage ====
Pos	Team	Pld	W	D	L	GF	GA	GD	Pts	Qualification
1	Barcelona	18	10	4	4	22	13	+9	34	Qualified to the Liguilla Final
2	Aucas	18	10	2	6	25	27	−2	32	Qualified to the Liguilla Final
3	Emelec	18	8	2	8	31	20	+11	26	Qualified to the Liguilla Final
4	Deportivo Quito	18	7	4	7	25	28	−3	25	
5	El Nacional	18	6	5	7	23	15	+8	23	
6	LDU Quito	18	5	8	5	24	23	+1	23	
7	Deportivo Cuenca	18	6	5	7	21	28	−7	23	
8	Macará	18	4	9	5	20	22	−2	21	
9	ESPOLI	18	6	3	9	19	29	−10	21	
10	Olmedo	18	3	8	7	20	25	−5	17	

===== Results =====
Home \ Away	SDA	BSC	CDC	SDQ	EN	CSE	CDE	LDU	MAC	CDO
Aucas								1–0		
Barcelona								2–2		
Deportivo Cuenca								2–2		
Deportivo Quito								2–1		
El Nacional								1–0		
Emelec								3–1		
ESPOLI								3–1		
LDU Quito	4–4	1–0	2–0	2–1	1–1	3–0	0–0		2–1	0–0
Macará								1–1		
Olmedo								1–1		

Source: RSSSF
Legend: Blue = home team win; Yellow = draw; Red = away team win.

==== Second stage ====
Pos	Team	Pld	W	D	L	GF	GA	GD	Pts	Qualification
1	Deportivo Quito	18	10	7	1	34	21	+13	37	Qualified to the Liguilla Final
2	El Nacional	18	9	7	2	29	14	+15	34	Qualified to the Liguilla Final
3	LDU Quito	18	9	4	5	30	19	+11	31	Qualified to the Liguilla Final
4	Deportivo Cuenca	18	9	4	5	27	21	+6	31	
5	Emelec	18	6	4	8	27	30	−3	22	
6	Barcelona	18	5	5	8	23	26	−3	20	
7	ESPOLI	18	4	6	8	27	35	−8	18	
8	Olmedo	18	3	9	6	18	27	−9	18	
9	Aucas	18	3	8	7	26	35	−9	17	
10	Macará	18	2	6	10	17	30	−13	12	

===== Results =====
Home \ Away	SDA	BSC	CDC	SDQ	EN	CSE	CDE	LDU	MAC	CDO
Aucas								0–1		
Barcelona								1–2		
Deportivo Cuenca								1–0		
Deportivo Quito								2–1		
El Nacional								1–0		
Emelec								3–1		
ESPOLI								1–6		
LDU Quito	2–1	4–3	1–1	0–2	1–1	2–2	2–0		3–0	3–0
Macará								0–0		
Olmedo								0–1		

Source: RSSSF
Legend: Blue = home team win; Yellow = draw; Red = away team win.

==== Liguilla Final ====
Pos	Team	Pld	W	D	L	GF	GA	GD	BP	Pts	Qualification
1	Emelec	10	6	1	3	15	14	+1	1	20	Champion and Qualified to the 2003 Copa Libertadores
2	Barcelona	10	4	4	2	14	10	+4	3	19	Qualified to the 2003 Copa Libertadores
3	El Nacional	10	5	1	4	12	12	0	2	18	Qualified to the 2003 Copa Libertadores
4	LDU Quito	10	4	2	4	11	12	−1	1	15	
5	Deportivo Quito	10	3	2	5	15	14	+1	3	14	
6	Aucas	10	2	2	6	13	18	−5	0	8	

Rules for classification: Includes bonus points earned in previous stages. Includes bonus points earned in previous stages.

===== Results =====
Home \ Away	SDA	BSC	SDQ	EN	CSE	LDU
Aucas						0–3
Barcelona						2–0
Deportivo Quito						0–1
El Nacional						2–1
Emelec						3–0
LDU Quito	3–2	0–0	1–1	1–0	1–2	

Source: RSSSF
Legend: Blue = home team win; Yellow = draw; Red = away team win.
