= 1985 Liga Deportiva Universitaria de Quito season =

L.D.U. Quito
1985 season
- President: Raúl Vaca
- Manager: Héctor Morales; Carlos Oria
- Stadium: Estadio Olímpico Atahualpa
- Serie A: 9th
Home colours	Away colours

Liga Deportiva Universitaria de Quito's 1985 season was the club's 55th year of existence, the 32nd year in professional football and the 25th in the top level of professional football in Ecuador.

== Kits ==
Sponsor(s): Mutualista Pichincha

== Competitions ==
=== Serie A ===
==== First stage ====
Pos	Team	Pld	W	D	L	GF	GA	GD	Pts	Qualification or relegation
1	Filanbanco	34	18	8	8	65	31	+34	44	Qualified to the Liguilla Final
2	Barcelona	30	16	9	5	39	20	+19	41	Qualified to the Liguilla Final
3	Deportivo Quito	30	14	9	7	53	36	+17	37	Qualified to the Liguilla Final
4	El Nacional	30	14	7	9	70	47	+23	35	Qualified to the Liguilla Final
5	Universidad Católica	30	12	10	8	46	36	+10	34	Qualified to the Liguilla Final
6	9 de Octubre	30	12	10	8	38	29	+9	34	Qualified to the Liguilla Final
7	L.D.U. Portoviejo	30	14	6	10	42	45	−3	34	Qualified to the Liguilla Final
8	Esmeraldas Petrolero	30	14	5	11	36	30	+6	33	Qualified to the Liguilla Final
9	L.D.U. Quito	30	14	5	11	52	46	+6	33	
10	Emelec	30	11	5	14	43	46	−3	27	
11	Deportivo Quevedo	30	8	11	11	24	34	−10	27	
12	Deportivo Cuenca	30	10	3	17	40	50	−10	23	
13	Técnico Universitario	30	8	5	17	28	43	−15	21	
14	Audaz Octubrino	30	9	3	18	32	65	−33	21	
15	América de Quito	30	4	11	15	18	40	−22	19	
16	Manta Sport	30	5	7	18	26	54	−28	17	Relegated to the Segunda Categoría

===== Results =====
Home \ Away	CDA	AO	BSC	CDC	CDQ	SDQ	EN	CSE	EP	CDF	LDP	LDQ	MSC	TU	UC	9DO
América de Quito												1–1				
Audaz Octubrino												2–1				
Barcelona												1–0				
Deportivo Cuenca												2–3				
Deportivo Quevedo												0–1				
Deportivo Quito												3–2				
El Nacional												3–5				
Emelec												5–1				
Esmeraldas Petrolero												2–0				
Filanbanco												3–2				
L.D.U. Portoviejo												1–0				
L.D.U. Quito	1–0	5–2	4–1	3–2	2–1	1–1	2–2	2–0	1–2	2–2	3–2		3–2	3–1	2–1	1–0
Manta Sport												1–0				
Técnico Universitario												1–0				
Universidad Católica												1–0				
9 de Octubre												1–1				

Source: RSSSF
Legend: Blue = home team win; Yellow = draw; Red = away team win.
