= 1970 Liga Deportiva Universitaria de Quito season =

L.D.U. Quito
1970 season
- President: Telmo Ponce
- Manager: José Gómez Nogueira (Copa Libertadores); Yamandú Solimando (Serie A)
- Stadium: Estadio Olímpico Atahualpa
- Serie A: 4th
- Copa Libertadores: Second Stage
Home colours	Away colours

Liga Deportiva Universitaria de Quito's 1970 season was the club's 40th year of existence, the 17th year in professional football, and the 11th in the top level of professional football in Ecuador.

== Squad ==
No.	Pos.	Nation	Player
—	GK	ECU	Adolfo Bolaños
—	GK	ECU	César Mantilla
—	GK	URU	Rubén Montoya
—	GK	URU	Yamandú Solimando
—	DF	ECU	Hugo Cabrera
—	DF	ECU	Washington Guevara
—	DF	ECU	Patricio Maldonado
—	DF	ECU	César Muñoz
—	DF	ECU	Iván Noboa
—	DF	ECU	Enrique Portilla
—	DF	ECU	Ramiro Tobar
—	DF	ECU	Eduardo Zambrano (captain)
—	MF	ARG	Santiago Alé
—	MF	URU	Óscar Barreto

No.	Pos.	Nation	Player
—	MF	ECU	Hernán Marten
—	MF	ECU	Milton Pazmiño
—	MF	ECU	Roberto Sussman
—	MF	ECU	Jorge Tapia
—	MF	ECU	Mario Zambrano
—	FW	PAR	Arístides del Puerto
—	FW	URU	Francisco Bertocchi
—	FW	ECU	Armando Larrea
—	FW	ECU	Marco Moreno
—	FW	ECU	Patricio Pintado
—	FW	URU	Carlos Ríos
—	FW	ECU	Miguel Salazar
—	FW	PAR	Roberto Schettina

== Competitions ==
=== Serie A ===
==== First stage ====
Pos	Team	Pld	W	D	L	GF	GA	GD	Pts	Qualification
1	Barcelona	24	14	6	4	33	17	+16	34	Qualified to the Liguilla Final
2	LDU Quito	24	11	6	7	37	26	+11	28	Qualified to the Liguilla Final
3	América de Quito	24	9	10	5	30	27	+3	28	Qualified to the Liguilla Final
4	Emelec	24	9	9	6	28	24	+4	27	Qualified to the Liguilla Final
5	Deportivo Quito	24	10	6	8	26	25	+1	26	Qualified to the Liguilla Final

Source: RSSSF - 1970 Serie A

===== Results =====
Home \ Away	CDA	SDA	BSC	SDQ	EN	CSE	CDE	LDP	LDQ	MAC	CSP	UC	9DO
América de Quito									1–0				
Aucas									1–1				
Barcelona									1–0				
Deportivo Quito									2–0				
El Nacional									3–1				
Emelec									2–0				
Everest									0–1				
L.D.U. Portoviejo									3–1				
L.D.U. Quito	1–1	3–2	1–0	1–3	2–2	2–0	6–2	3–0		2–2	4–1	0–0	2–0
Macará									0–2				
Patria									0–3				
Universidad Católica									0–1				
9 de Octubre									0–0				

Source: RSSSF
Legend: Blue = home team win; Yellow = draw; Red = away team win.

==== Liguilla Final ====
Pos	Team	Pld	W	D	L	GF	GA	GD	Pts	Qualification
2	Emelec	34	14	11	9	47	32	+15	39	Qualified to the 1971 Copa Libertadores
3	América de Quito	34	13	13	8	38	35	+3	39	
4	LDU Quito	34	14	8	12	51	45	+6	36	
5	El Nacional	34	13	9	12	54	42	+12	35	
6	Deportivo Quito	34	13	8	13	32	36	−4	34	

Source: RSSSF - 1970 Serie A

===== Results =====
Home \ Away	CDA	BSC	SDQ	EN	CSE	LDQ
América de Quito						1–0
Barcelona						3–2
Deportivo Quito						3–2
El Nacional						0–3
Emelec						6–1
LDU Quito	1–1	1–1	2–0	2–1	0–3	

Source: RSSSF
Legend: Blue = home team win; Yellow = draw; Red = away team win.

=== Copa Libertadores ===
==== First stage ====
Pos	Team	Pld	W	D	L	GF	GA	GD	Pts	Qualification	(Peru) UNI	(Ecuador) LDU	(Peru) DEF	(Ecuador) CDA
1	(Peru) Universitario	6	4	1	1	11	4	+7	9	Qualified to the Second Phase		2–0	2–1	3–0
2	(Ecuador) LDU Quito	6	3	1	2	10	6	+4	7	Qualified to the Second Phase	2–0		1–2	4–1
3	(Peru) Defensor Arica	6	1	3	2	5	6	−1	5		1–1	0–0		0–1
4	(Ecuador) América de Quito	6	1	1	4	4	14	−10	3		0–3	1–3	1–1	

Legend: Blue = home team win; Yellow = draw; Red = away team win.

February 15 First Stage	LDU Quito (Ecuador)	2–0	(Peru) Universitario	Quito, Ecuador
	Bertocchi 24', 28'	Report		Stadium: Estadio Olímpico Atahualpa; Referee: José Varrone (Venezuela)

February 21 First Stage	LDU Quito (Ecuador)	1–2	(Peru) Defensor Arica	Quito, Ecuador
	Bertocchi 39' (pen.)	Report	Quintana 3'; Urrunaga 9'	Stadium: Estadio Olímpico Atahualpa; Referee: Iván de Jesús Barrios (Venezuela)

March 1 First Stage	LDU Quito (Ecuador)	4–1	(Ecuador) América de Quito	Quito, Ecuador
	Bertocchi 17', 32'; Ríos 32', 34'	Report	Aguirre 50'	Stadium: Estadio Olímpico Atahualpa; Referee: Eduardo Rendón (Ecuador)

March 14 First Stage	Defensor Arica (Peru)	0–0	(Ecuador) LDU Quito	Lima, Peru
		Report		Stadium: Estadio Nacional de Lima; Referee: Ángel Coerezza (Argentina)

March 16 First Stage	Universitario (Peru)	2–0	(Ecuador) LDU Quito	Lima, Peru
	Jurado 22'; Casaretto 48' (pen.)	Report		Stadium: Estadio Nacional de Lima; Referee: Isidro Ramírez (Paraguay)

March 22 First Stage	América de Quito (Ecuador)	1–3	(Ecuador) LDU Quito	Quito, Ecuador
	Bertocchi 55', 59'; Ríos 38'	Report	Novasco 11'	Stadium: Estadio Olímpico Atahualpa; Referee: Jaime Coronel (Ecuador)

==== Second phase ====
Pos	Team	Pld	W	D	L	GF	GA	GD	Pts	Qualification	(Uruguay) PEÑ	(Paraguay) GUA	(Ecuador) LDU
1	(Uruguay) Peñarol	4	3	0	1	6	4	+2	6	Qualified to the Third Phase		1–0	2–1
2	(Paraguay) Guaraní	4	1	1	2	3	3	0	3		2–0		1–1
3	(Ecuador) LDU Quito	4	1	1	2	4	6	−2	3		1–3	1–0	

Legend: Blue = home team win; Yellow = draw; Red = away team win.
April 12, 1970

LDU Quito (Ecuador)	1 – 3	(Uruguay) Peñarol

Quito, Ecuador

April 19, 1970

Guaraní (Paraguay)	2 – 0	(Uruguay) Peñarol

Asunción, Paraguay

April 22, 1970

LDU Quito (Ecuador)	1 – 0	(Paraguay) Guaraní

Quito, Ecuador

April 26, 1970

Peñarol (Uruguay)	1 – 0	(Paraguay) Guaraní

Montevideo, Uruguay

April 29, 1970

Guaraní (Paraguay)	1 – 1	(Ecuador) LDU Quito

Asunción, Paraguay

May 2, 1970

Peñarol (Uruguay)	2 – 1	(Ecuador) LDU Quito

Montevideo, Uruguay

April 12 Second Stage	LDU Quito (Ecuador)	1–3	(Uruguay) Peñarol	Quito, Ecuador
	Tobar 17'	Report	Acuña 14'; Spencer 34'; Onega 58'	Stadium: Estadio Olímpico Atahualpa; Referee: Erwin Hieger (Peru)

April 22 Second Stage	LDU Quito (Ecuador)	1–0	(Paraguay) Guaraní	Quito, Ecuador
	Bertocchi 50'	Report		Stadium: Estadio Olímpico Atahualpa; Referee: Sergio Chechelev (Venezuela)

April 29 Second Stage	Guaraní (Paraguay)	1–1	(Ecuador) LDU Quito	Asunción, Paraguay
	Martínez 81'	Report	Bertocchi 5'	Stadium: Estadio de Puerto Sajonia; Referee: Édison Pérez Núñez (Peru)

May 2 Second Stage	Peñarol (Uruguay)	2–1	(Ecuador) LDU Quito	Montevideo, Uruguay
	Onega 59'; Gonçalves 71'	Report	Salazar 55'	Stadium: Estadio Centenario; Referee: Jaime Amor (Chile)
