= 1975 Liga Deportiva Universitaria de Quito season =

L.D.U. Quito
1975 season
- President: Raúl Vaca
- Manager: Leonel Montoya
- Stadium: Estadio Olímpico Atahualpa
- Serie A: Champions (3rd title)
- Copa Libertadores: Semi-finals
- Top goalscorer: League: Juan José Pérez (29 goals); All: Juan José Pérez (34 goals)
Home colours	Away colours

Liga Deportiva Universitaria de Quito's 1975 season was the club's 45th year of existence, the 22nd year in professional football and the 15th in the top level of professional football in Ecuador.

== Squad ==
No.	Pos.	Nation	Player
—	GK	ECU	Adolfo Bolaños
—	GK	URU	Walter Maesso
—	DF	URU	Luis De Carlos
—	DF	ECU	Humboldt De La Torre
—	DF	ECU	Fernando Villena
—	DF	ECU	Washington Guevara
—	DF	ECU	Patricio Maldonado
—	DF	ECU	Ramiro Tobar (captain)
—	MF	ECU	Polo Carrera
—	MF	URU	Juan Carlos Gómez

No.	Pos.	Nation	Player
—	MF	ECU	Juan Ribadeneira
—	MF	ECU	Roberto Sussman
—	MF	ECU	Jorge Tapia
—	FW	ECU	Ramiro Aguirre
—	FW	ECU	Marco Moreno
—	FW	ECU	Julio Paz y Miño
—	FW	ARG	Juan José Pérez
—	FW	ECU	Gustavo Tapia
—	FW	ECU	Hernán Vaca
—	FW	URU	Oscar Zubía

== Competitions ==
=== Serie A ===
==== First stage ====
Pos	Team	Pld	W	D	L	GF	GA	GD	Pts	Qualification or relegation
1	LDU Quito	22	12	5	5	43	22	+21	29	Qualified to the Liguilla Final
2	Deportivo Cuenca	22	13	3	6	44	25	+19	29	Qualified to the Liguilla Final
3	Barcelona	22	9	9	4	40	27	+13	27	Qualified to the Liguilla Final
4	El Nacional	22	10	6	6	33	19	+14	26	
5	Emelec	22	9	4	9	28	30	−2	22	

Source: RSSSF - 1975 Serie A

===== Results =====
Home \ Away	9DO	CDA	SDA	BSC	CME	CDC	SDQ	EN	CSE	LDP	LDQ	UC
9 de Octubre											0–1	
América de Quito											1–2	
Aucas											0–2	
Barcelona											2–1	
Carmen Mora											2–1	
Deportivo Cuenca											2–1	
Deportivo Quito											1–4	
El Nacional											1–3	
Emelec											0–1	
L.D.U. Portoviejo											1–0	
L.D.U. Quito	6–1	4–4	0–0	2–2	2–0	1–0	3–1	1–1	4–1	3–0		1–1
Universidad Católica											1–0	

Source: RSSSF
Legend: Blue = home team win; Yellow = draw; Red = away team win.

==== Second stage ====
===== Results =====
Home \ Away	CDA	SDA	BSC	CDC	SDQ	EN	CSE	LDP	LDQ	UC
América de Quito									0–0	
Aucas									1–0	
Barcelona									0–0	
Deportivo Cuenca									2–0	
Deportivo Quito									0–1	
El Nacional									3–3	
Emelec									0–0	
L.D.U. Portoviejo									2–1	
L.D.U. Quito	1–1	3–2	2–0	1–3	0–0	3–0	2–1	3–0		3–1
Universidad Católica									3–2	

Source: RSSSF
Legend: Blue = home team win; Yellow = draw; Red = away team win.

==== Liguilla Final ====
Pos	Team	Pld	W	D	L	GF	GA	GD	Pts	Qualification
1	LDU Quito (C)	8	4	3	1	12	8	+4	14 (Note: Includes bonus points earned in the earlier stages: Deportivo Cuenca 5; LDU Quito 3; Aucas 2; Barcelona and Universidad Católica 1 each.)	1976 Copa Libertadores
2	Deportivo Cuenca	8	2	2	4	5	10	−5	11	1976 Copa Libertadores
3	Aucas	8	2	4	2	7	10	−3	10	
4	Barcelona	8	3	2	3	11	8	+3	9	
5	Universidad Católica	8	2	3	3	8	7	+1	8	

Source: RSSSF - 1975 Serie A
(C) Champions

===== Results =====
Home \ Away	SDA	BSC	CDC	LDQ	UC
Aucas				3–3	
Barcelona				2–2	
Deportivo Cuenca				1–0	
L.D.U. Quito	2–0	1–0	1–0		1–0
Universidad Católica				2–2	

Source: RSSSF
Legend: Blue = home team win; Yellow = draw; Red = away team win.

=== Copa Libertadores ===
Overall								Home						Away					
Pld	W	D	L	GF	GA	GD	Pts	W	D	L	GF	GA	GD	W	D	L	GF	GA	GD
10	4	4	2	17	13	+4	16	3	2	0	12	6	+6	1	2	2	5	7	−2

==== First stage ====
Pos	Team	Pld	W	D	L	GF	GA	GD	Pts	Qualification or relegation	(Ecuador) LDQ	(Venezuela) POR	(Venezuela) DGA	(Ecuador) NAC
1	(Ecuador) LDU Quito	6	3	3	0	12	7	+5	9	Qualified to the Semi-finals	—	1–1	4–2	3–1
2	(Venezuela) Portuguesa	6	1	4	1	5	8	−3	6		1–1	—	1–1	1–0
3	(Venezuela) Deportivo Galicia	6	1	3	2	7	6	+1	5		0–1	0–0	—	4–0
4	(Ecuador) El Nacional	6	1	2	3	8	11	−3	4		2–2	5–1	0–0	—

Legend: Blue = home team win; Yellow = draw; Red = away team win.

February 16 First Stage	L.D.U. Quito (Ecuador)	3–1	(Ecuador) El Nacional	Quito, Ecuador
	Pérez 2', 50'; Gómez 89'	Report	Ron 60'	Stadium: Estadio Olímpico Atahualpa; Referee: Mario Canessa (Chile)

February 23 First Stage	L.D.U. Quito (Ecuador)	4–2	(Venezuela) Deportivo Galicia	Quito, Ecuador
	Zubía 4'; Pérez 34'; Carrera 64', 82'	Report	Tião Quelé 79'; Rivero 90'	Stadium: Estadio Olímpico Atahualpa; Referee: Carlos Rivero (Peru)

March 5 First Stage	L.D.U. Quito (Ecuador)	1–1	(Venezuela) Portuguesa	Quito, Ecuador
	Pérez 13'	Report	Baesso 8'	Stadium: Estadio Olímpico Atahualpa; Referee: Juan Ortubé (Bolivia)

March 9 First Stage	El Nacional (Ecuador)	2–2	(Ecuador) L.D.U. Quito	Quito, Ecuador
	Paz y Miño 42'; Lasso 77'	Report	Pérez 70'; Carrera 75'	Stadium: Estadio Olímpico Atahualpa; Referee: Romualdo Arppi Filho (Brazil)

March 16 First Stage	Deportivo Galicia (Venezuela)	0–1	(Ecuador) L.D.U. Quito	Caracas, Venezuela
		Report	Tobar 11'	Stadium: Estadio Olímpico; Referee: Rafael Hormazábal (Chile)

March 19 First Stage	Portuguesa (Venezuela)	1–1	(Ecuador) L.D.U. Quito	Acarigua, Venezuela
	Núñez 72' (pen.)	Report	Vaca 71'	Stadium: Estadio General José Antonio Paez; Referee: Milton Lorenzo (Uruguay)

==== Semi-finals ====
Pos	Team	Pld	W	D	L	GF	GA	GD	Pts	Qualification or relegation	(Chile) UE	(Peru) UNI	(Ecuador) LDQ
1	(Chile) Unión Española	4	2	1	1	7	6	+1	5	Qualified to the Final	—	2–1	2–0
2	(Peru) Universitario	4	1	2	1	4	4	0	4		1–1	—	2–1
3	(Ecuador) LDU Quito	4	1	1	2	5	6	−1	3		4–2	0–0	—

Legend: Blue = home team win; Yellow = draw; Red = away team win.

May 4 Semi-finals	L.D.U. Quito (Ecuador)	0–0	(Peru) Universitario	Quito, Ecuador
		Report		Stadium: Estadio Olímpico Atahualpa; Referee: Guillermo Velásquez (Colombia)

May 7 Semi-finals	L.D.U. Quito (Ecuador)	4–2	(Chile) Unión Española	Quito, Ecuador
	Carrera 15', 67'; G. Tapia 17', 34'	Report	Trujillo 27'; Gaete 49' (pen.)	Stadium: Estadio Olímpico Atahualpa; Referee: Gregorio da Rosa (Uruguay)

May 22 Semi-finals	Universitario (Peru)	2–1	(Ecuador) L.D.U. Quito	Lima, Peru
	Ramírez 23'; Techera 29'	Report	Gómez 77'	Stadium: Estadio Nacional de Lima; Referee: Óscar Veiro (Argentina)

May 27 Semi-finals	Unión Española (Chile)	2–0	(Ecuador) L.D.U. Quito	Santiago, Chile
	Trujillo 61'; Hoffmann 70'	Report		Stadium: Estadio Nacional; Referee: Omar Delgado (Colombia)
