= 1987 Liga Deportiva Universitaria de Quito season =

L.D.U. Quito
1987 season
- President: Raúl Vaca
- Manager: Leonel Montoya
- Stadium: Estadio Olímpico Atahualpa
- Serie A: 6th
- Top goalscorer: José Vicente Moreno (20 goals)
Home colours	Away colours

Liga Deportiva Universitaria de Quito's 1987 season was the club's 57th year of existence, the 34th year in professional football and the 27th in the top level of professional football in Ecuador.

== Kits ==
Sponsor(s): Banco de la Producción

== Competitions ==
=== Serie A ===
==== First stage ====
Pos	Team	Pld	W	D	L	GF	GA	GD	Pts	Qualification or relegation
1	Barcelona	34	21	5	8	50	25	+25	47	Qualified to the Second Stage
2	El Nacional	34	19	6	9	67	41	+26	44	Qualified to the Second Stage
3	L.D.U. Quito	34	14	15	5	49	29	+20	43	Qualified to the Second Stage
4	Deportivo Cuenca	34	16	11	7	39	21	+18	43	Qualified to the Second Stage
5	Filanbanco	34	17	8	9	57	37	+20	42	Qualified to the Second Stage
6	Deportivo Quito	34	13	11	10	52	38	+14	37	Qualified to the Second Stage
7	Aucas	34	13	11	10	48	42	+6	37	Qualified to the Second Stage
8	Audaz Octubrino	34	14	9	11	37	39	−2	37	Qualified to the Second Stage
9	L.D.U. Portoviejo	34	14	8	12	51	41	+10	36	Qualified to the Second Stage
10	Emelec	34	14	6	14	43	37	+6	34	Qualified to the Second Stage
11	Técnico Universitario	34	11	12	11	42	40	+2	34	Qualified to the Second Stage
12	Macará	34	12	10	12	49	53	−4	34	Qualified to the Second Stage
13	América de Quito	34	9	12	13	32	39	−7	30	
14	Deportivo Quevedo	34	11	6	17	39	66	−27	28	
15	Universidad Católica	34	8	9	17	31	47	−16	25	
16	Esmeraldas Petrolero	34	8	9	17	35	57	−22	25	
17	River Plate	34	6	12	16	33	50	−17	24	
18	Deportivo Cotopaxi	34	3	6	25	26	78	−52	12	Relegated to the Segunda Categoría

===== Results =====
Home \ Away	CDA	SDA	AO	BSC	COT	CDC	CDQ	SDQ	EN	CSE	EP	CDF	LDP	LDQ	MAC	RPR	TU	UC
América de Quito														1–1				
Aucas														0–0				
Audaz Octubrino														0–0				
Barcelona														0–0				
Deportivo Cotopaxi														1–2				
Deportivo Cuenca														0–0				
Deportivo Quevedo														2–1				
Deportivo Quito														0–3				
El Nacional														1–0				
Emelec														1–1				
Esmeraldas Petrolero														2–2				
Filanbanco														1–1				
L.D.U. Portoviejo														0–2				
L.D.U. Quito	1–1	0–0	5–1	0–2	1–0	1–1	6–2	2–0	1–1	2–0	3–0	1–1	3–1		0–0	1–1	0–3	1–0
Macará														2–1				
River Plate														2–3				
Técnico Universitario														1–2				
Universidad Católica														1–2				

Source: RSSSF
Legend: Blue = home team win; Yellow = draw; Red = away team win.

==== Second stage ====
Group 1

Pos	Team	Pld	W	D	L	GF	GA	GD	Pts	Qualification
1	Barcelona	10	4	4	2	14	12	+2	14 (Note: Includes bonus points earned in previous stages: Barcelona (2).)	Qualified to the Liguilla Final
2	Filanbanco	10	5	3	2	21	7	+14	13	Qualified to the Liguilla Final
3	L.D.U. Quito	10	4	2	4	19	19	0	10	
4	Aucas	10	4	2	4	13	14	−1	10	
5	L.D.U. Portoviejo	10	3	4	3	14	16	−2	10	
6	Técnico Universitario	10	1	3	6	10	23	−13	5	

===== Results =====
Home \ Away	SDA	BSC	CDF	LDP	LDQ	TU
Aucas					1–1	
Barcelona					2–1	
Filanbanco					7–1	
L.D.U. Portoviejo					4–2	
L.D.U. Quito	3–1	3–1	1–0	1–1		5–0
Técnico Universitario					2–1	

Source: RSSSF
Legend: Blue = home team win; Yellow = draw; Red = away team win.
