= 1979 Liga Deportiva Universitaria de Quito season =

L.D.U. Quito
1979 season
- President: Rodrigo Paz
- Manager: César Muñoz; José Gómez Nogueira
- Stadium: Estadio Olímpico Atahualpa
- Serie A: 5th
- Top goalscorer: Roberto Inzúa (18 goals)
Home colours	Away colours

Liga Deportiva Universitaria de Quito's 1979 season was the club's 49th year of existence, the 26th year in professional football, the 19th in the top level of professional football in Ecuador.

== Kits ==
Sponsor(s): Ecuacolor

== Competitions ==
=== Serie A ===
==== First stage ====
Pos	Team	Pld	W	D	L	GF	GA	GD	Pts	Qualification or relegation
1	Deportivo Cuenca	18	10	3	5	26	18	+8	23	Qualified to the Liguilla Final
2	L.D.U. Quito	18	8	5	5	21	20	+1	21	Qualified to the Liguilla Final
3	Universidad Católica	18	9	2	7	27	21	+6	20	Qualified to the Liguilla Final
4	Deportivo Quito	18	6	8	4	25	24	+1	20	
5	Emelec	18	9	1	8	30	24	+6	19	
6	Técnico Universitario	18	7	5	6	28	23	+5	19	
7	Barcelona	18	5	6	7	22	24	−2	16	
8	América de Quito	18	4	7	7	21	24	−3	15	
9	El Nacional	18	6	3	9	22	31	−9	15	Relegated to the Serie B
10	Bonita Banana	18	4	4	10	9	22	−13	12	Relegated to the Serie B

===== Results =====
Home \ Away	CDA	BSC	BB	CDC	SDQ	EN	CSE	LDQ	TU	UC
América de Quito								2–2		
Barcelona								5–0		
Bonita Banana								1–0		
Deportivo Cuenca								2–0		
Deportivo Quito								2–1		
El Nacional								0–1		
Emelec								2–0		
L.D.U. Quito	1–0	3–1	3–1	0–0	2–0	0–0	3–1		1–1	2–1
Técnico Universitario								0–0		
Universidad Católica								1–2		

Source: RSSSF
Legend: Blue = home team win; Yellow = draw; Red = away team win.

==== Second stage ====
Pos	Team	Pld	W	D	L	GF	GA	GD	Pts	Qualification or relegation
1	Emelec	18	10	5	3	32	16	+16	25	Qualified to the Liguilla Final
2	Técnico Universitario	18	7	7	4	25	18	+7	21	Qualified to the Liguilla Final
3	Manta Sport	18	7	6	5	20	21	−1	20	Qualified to the Liguilla Final
4	América de Quito	18	7	5	6	23	19	+4	19	
5	Barcelona	18	8	3	7	27	24	+3	19	
6	Universidad Católica	18	6	6	6	26	25	+1	18	
7	Deportivo Cuenca	18	5	7	6	18	19	−1	17	
8	L.D.U. Quito	18	7	3	8	15	21	−6	17	
9	Aucas	18	5	5	8	19	29	−10	15	Relegated to the Serie B
10	Deportivo Quito	18	2	5	11	20	33	−13	9	Relegated to the Serie B

===== Results =====
Home \ Away	CDA	SDA	BSC	CDC	SDQ	CSE	LDQ	MSC	TU	UC
América de Quito							3–0			
Aucas							2–1			
Barcelona							2–1			
Deportivo Cuenca							1–1			
Deportivo Quito							0–2			
Emelec							3–0			
L.D.U. Quito	2–1	1–1	0–2	1–0	0–0	2–1		1–0	0–3	2–0
Manta Sport							1–0			
Técnico Universitario							1–0			
Universidad Católica							0–1			

Source: RSSSF
Legend: Blue = home team win; Yellow = draw; Red = away team win.

==== Liguilla Final ====
Pos	Team	Pld	W	D	L	GF	GA	GD	Pts	Qualification
1	Emelec	10	5	4	1	16	10	+6	17 (Note: Includes bonus points earned in previous stages: D. Cuenca & Emelec (3); LDU Quito & T. Universitario (2); Manta Sport & U. Católica (1).)	Champions and Qualified to the 1980 Copa Libertadores
2	Universidad Católica	10	7	1	2	12	6	+6	16	Qualified to the 1980 Copa Libertadores
3	Manta Sport	10	3	4	3	11	8	+3	11	
4	Técnico Universitario	10	3	2	5	13	16	−3	10	
5	L.D.U. Quito	10	3	2	5	13	17	−4	10	
6	Deportivo Cuenca	10	1	3	6	8	16	−8	8	

===== Results =====
Home \ Away	CDC	CSE	LDQ	MSC	TU	UC
Deportivo Cuenca			0–0			
Emelec			3–1			
L.D.U. Quito	4–3	2–2		3–2	2–1	1–2
Manta Sport			2–0			
Técnico Universitario			1–0			
Universidad Católica			1–0			

Source: RSSSF
Legend: Blue = home team win; Yellow = draw; Red = away team win.
