= 1973 Liga Deportiva Universitaria de Quito season =

L.D.U. Quito
1973 season
- President: Rodrigo Paz, Raúl Vaca & Edmundo Rivadeneira
- Manager: Leonel Montoya
- Stadium: Estadio Olímpico Atahualpa
- Segunda Categoría de Pichincha: Champions (1st title)
- Top goalscorer: Oscar Zubía (16 goals)
Home colours	Away colours

Liga Deportiva Universitaria de Quito's 1973 season was the club's 43rd year of existence, the 20th year in professional football and the 1st in the Segunda Categoría.

== Squad ==
No.	Pos.	Nation	Player
—	GK	ECU	Aldolfo Bolaños
—	GK	URU	Walter Maesso
—	DF	ECU	Hugo Cabrera
—	DF	ECU	Humboldt de la Torre
—	DF	ECU	Luis Garzón
—	DF	ECU	Washington Guevara
—	DF	ECU	Patricio Maldonado
—	DF	ECU	César Muñoz
—	DF	ECU	Iván Noboa
—	DF	ECU	Jorge Sáenz
—	DF	ECU	Fernando Villena

No.	Pos.	Nation	Player
—	MF	ARG	Santiago Alé
—	MF	URU	Juan Carlos Gómez
—	MF	ECU	Ángel Granja
—	MF	ECU	Roberto Sussman
—	MF	ECU	Jorge Tapia
—	FW	ECU	Ramiro Aguirre
—	FW	ECU	Marco Moreno
—	FW	ECU	Julio Paz y Miño
—	FW	ECU	Gustavo Tapia
—	FW	URU	Oscar Zubía

== Competitions ==
=== Segunda Categoría de Pichincha ===
Pos	Team	Pld	W	D	L	GF	GA	GD	Pts	Promotion or relegation
1	L.D.U. Quito	12	12	0	0	47	8	+39	24	Champions and Promoted to the Serie B
2	Aucas	12	9	1	2	25	9	+16	19	Promoted to the Serie B
3	San Lorenzo de La Vicentina	12	4	4	4	21	20	+1	12	
4	Politécnico	12	5	2	5	14	17	−3	12	
5	Puebla Junior	12	4	2	6	19	26	−7	10	
6	Shyris	12	2	0	10	10	23	−13	4	
7	10 de Agosto	12	1	1	10	4	37	−33	3	Relegated to the Pichincha Amateur League

==== Results ====
August 4, 1973	L.D.U. Quito	2–1	Shyris	Quito, Ecuador
	Paz y Miño 15'; J. Tapia 86'		Serrano	Stadium: Estadio Olímpico Atahualpa

August 10, 1973	L.D.U. Quito	4–1	San Lorenzo de La Vicentina	Quito, Ecuador
	Zubía 22', 38', 44', 70'		Arce	Stadium: Estadio Olímpico Atahualpa

August 17, 1973	L.D.U. Quito	5–0	Puebla Junior	Quito, Ecuador
	Moreno 2'; J. Tapia 47', 90'; Zubía 67'; Alé 70' (pen.)			Stadium: Estadio Olímpico Atahualpa

August 25, 1973	L.D.U. Quito	7–0	10 de Agosto	Quito, Ecuador
	Alé 18'; Zubía 23', 29', 75'; J. Tapia 27', 85'; Gómez 77'			Stadium: Estadio Olímpico Atahualpa

August 31, 1973	L.D.U. Quito	2–0	Politécnico	Quito, Ecuador
	J. Tapia,			Stadium: Estadio Olímpico Atahualpa

September 7, 1973	L.D.U. Quito	3–1	Aucas	Quito, Ecuador
	Moreno 14'; J. Tapia 19'; Zubía 71'		Gafter	Stadium: Estadio Olímpico Atahualpa

October 19, 1973	Politécnico	1–3	L.D.U. Quito	Quito, Ecuador
	Albuja		J. Tapia; Alé; Zubía	Stadium: Estadio Olímpico Atahualpa

October 23, 1973	San Lorenzo de La Vicentina	0–2	L.D.U. Quito	Quito, Ecuador
			Gómez,	Stadium: Estadio Olímpico Atahualpa

October 27, 1973	Shyris	1–2	L.D.U. Quito	Quito, Ecuador
	Ortíz		Zubía; G. Tapia	Stadium: Estadio Olímpico Atahualpa

November 3, 1973	Puebla Junior	1–6	L.D.U. Quito	Quito, Ecuador
	Espinoza		Moreno,, Gómez; Alé; G. Tapia	Stadium: Estadio Olímpico Atahualpa

November 18, 1973	Aucas	1–3	L.D.U. Quito	Quito, Ecuador
	A. Gómez		J. Tapia; Alé; G. Tapia	Stadium: Estadio Olímpico Atahualpa

November 24, 1973	10 de Agosto	1–8	L.D.U. Quito	Quito, Ecuador
	Llerena		Zubía,,,, Moreno; G. Tapia; J. Tapia	Stadium: Estadio Olímpico Atahualpa
