= 1971 Liga Deportiva Universitaria de Quito season =

L.D.U. Quito
1971 season
- President: Edwin Ripalda
- Manager: Carlos Arce; Raúl Jiménez
- Stadium: Estadio Olímpico Atahualpa
- Serie A: 6th
- Top goalscorer: Carlos Ríos (12 goals)
Home colours	Away colours

Liga Deportiva Universitaria de Quito's 1971 season was the club's 41st year of existence, the 18th year in professional football and the 12th in the top level of professional football in Ecuador.

== Competitions ==
=== Serie A ===
==== First stage ====
Group B
Pos	Team	Pld	W	D	L	GF	GA	GD	Pts	Qualification
1	Universidad Católica	14	8	3	3	28	13	+15	19	Qualified to the Liguilla Final
2	LDU Quito	14	6	5	3	23	14	+9	17	Qualified to the Liguilla Final
3	Barcelona	14	7	3	4	21	14	+7	17	Qualified to the Liguilla Final
4	LDU Portoviejo	14	4	8	2	25	19	+6	16	Qualified to the Liguilla Final
5	Deportivo Quito	14	5	3	6	22	25	−3	13	Qualified to the Liguilla del No Descenso

Source: RSSSF - 1971 Serie A

===== Results =====
Home \ Away	BSC	BRA	SDQ	LDP	LDQ	CDO	UC	9DO
Barcelona					1–0			
Brasil					0–0			
Deportivo Quito					1–3			
L.D.U. Portoviejo					2–2			
L.D.U. Quito	2–1	3–0	4–2	1–1		1–1	1–1	4–0
Olmedo					0–1			
Universidad Católica					2–0			
9 de Octubre					2–1			

Source: RSSSF
Legend: Blue = home team win; Yellow = draw; Red = away team win.

==== Liguilla Final ====
Pos	Team	Pld	W	D	L	GF	GA	GD	Pts	Qualification or relegation
4	El Nacional	14	5	5	4	18	17	+1	15	
5	Universidad Católica	14	4	5	5	17	17	0	13	
6	LDU Quito	14	4	5	5	13	14	−1	13	
7	Deportivo Cuenca	14	2	9	3	8	12	−4	13	Relegated to the Serie B
8	LDU Portoviejo	14	2	4	8	14	27	−13	8	Relegated to the Serie B

Source: RSSSF - 1971 Serie A

===== Results =====
Home \ Away	CDA	BSC	CDC	EN	CSE	LDP	LDQ	UC
América de Quito							1–1	
Barcelona							3–0	
Deportivo Cuenca							0–0	
El Nacional							1–0	
Emelec							0–0	
L.D.U. Portoviejo							2–1	
L.D.U. Quito	1–1	1–2	1–1	0–1	1–0	4–2		1–0
Universidad Católica							0–2	

Source: RSSSF
Legend: Blue = home team win; Yellow = draw; Red = away team win.
