= 1982 Liga Deportiva Universitaria de Quito season =

L.D.U. Quito
1982 season
- President: Gonzalo Estupiñán
- Manager: Luis Grimaldi; Ramiro Tobar; Humberto Maschio
- Stadium: Estadio Olímpico Atahualpa
- Serie A: 9th
- Copa Libertadores: First Stage
Home colours	Away colours

Liga Deportiva Universitaria de Quito's 1982 season was the club's 52nd year of existence, the 29th year in professional football and the 22nd in the top level of professional football in Ecuador.

== Kits ==
Sponsor(s): Banco Popular

== Squad ==
No.	Pos.	Nation	Player
—	GK	BRA	Ubirajara Alcântara
—	GK	ECU	Adolfo Bolaños
—	GK	ECU	Patricio Gallardo
—	GK	ECU	Fernando Moya
—	DF	URU	Julio César Antúnez
—	DF	ECU	Luis Corrales
—	DF	ECU	Mauricio King
—	DF	ECU	Marco Moreno
—	DF	ECU	Juan Ruales
—	DF	ECU	Danilo Samaniego
—	DF	ECU	Fabián Sandoval
—	DF	ECU	Homero Valencia
—	MF	ECU	Ricardo Armendáriz
—	MF	ECU	Fabián Cáceres

No.	Pos.	Nation	Player
—	MF	ECU	Polo Carrera (captain)
—	MF	URU	Luis Fernández
—	MF	ECU	Polo Herrera
—	MF	BRA	Celso Monteiro
—	MF	URU	Nelson Moraes
—	MF	ECU	Luis Eduardo Vaca
—	MF	ECU	Juan Yánez
—	FW	ECU	Mauricio Argüello
—	FW	ECU	José Cruz
—	FW	ECU	José Vicente Moreno
—	FW	ECU	Patricio Moscoso
—	FW	ARG	Daniel Severiano Pavón
—	FW	ECU	Ricardo Porras
—	FW	BRA	Silva Demoledor

== Competitions ==
=== Serie A ===
==== First stage ====
Pos	Team	Pld	W	D	L	GF	GA	GD	Pts	Qualification
1	El Nacional	18	10	3	5	33	25	+8	23	Qualified to the Liguilla Final
2	L.D.U. Portoviejo	18	10	2	6	31	23	+8	22	Qualified to the Liguilla Final
3	Barcelona	18	9	4	5	28	23	+5	22	Qualified to the Liguilla Final
4	Emelec	18	8	4	6	22	20	+2	20	
5	Deportivo Quito	18	6	6	6	24	20	+4	18	
6	Técico Universitario	18	7	4	7	22	24	−2	18	
7	Universidad Católica	18	7	4	7	19	21	−2	18	
8	9 de Octubre	18	5	4	9	20	23	−3	14	
9	L.D.U. Quito	18	5	4	9	14	24	−10	14	
10	Everest	18	4	3	11	16	26	−10	11	

===== Results =====
Home \ Away	BSC	SDQ	EN	CSE	CDE	LDP	LDQ	TU	UC	9DO
Barcelona							3–0			
Deportivo Quito							4–2			
El Nacional							1–0			
Emelec							5–0			
Everest							0–0			
L.D.U. Portoviejo							3–1			
L.D.U. Quito	3–0	1–1	0–2	1–0	0–1	1–0		3–1	0–1	2–1
Técnico Universitario							0–0			
Universidad Católica							0–0			
9 de Octubre							1–0			

Source: RSSSF
Legend: Blue = home team win; Yellow = draw; Red = away team win.

==== Second stage ====
Pos	Team	Pld	W	D	L	GF	GA	GD	Pts	Qualification
1	Barcelona	22	11	7	4	24	14	+10	29	Qualified to the Liguilla Final
2	9 de Octubre	22	11	5	6	41	28	+13	27	Qualified to the Liguilla Final
3	El Nacional	22	11	4	7	40	26	+14	26	Qualified to the Liguilla Final
4	L.D.U. Portoviejo	22	11	4	7	40	30	+10	26	
5	Universidad Católica	22	9	7	6	36	24	+12	25	
6	Deportivo Quevedo	22	7	9	6	34	33	+1	23	
7	Técico Universitario	22	8	6	8	32	30	+2	22	
8	Emelec	22	9	4	9	30	30	0	22	
9	L.D.U. Quito	22	7	7	8	32	31	+1	21	
10	Aucas	22	6	5	11	27	44	−17	17	
11	Deportivo Quito	22	4	8	10	19	35	−16	16	
12	Everest	22	3	4	15	21	50	−29	10	

===== Results =====
Home \ Away	SDA	BSC	CDQ	SDQ	EN	CSE	CDE	LDP	LDQ	TU	UC	9DO
Aucas									0–4			
Barcelona									2–0			
Deportivo Quevedo									2–1			
Deportivo Quito									0–0			
El Nacional									4–1			
Emelec									2–2			
Everest									2–1			
L.D.U. Portoviejo									2–0			
L.D.U. Quito	1–1	0–0	3–0	1–1	2–1	3–0	2–1	4–2		2–2	0–0	3–1
Técnico Universitario									3–1			
Universidad Católica									1–0			
9 de Octubre									4–1			

Source: RSSSF
Legend: Blue = home team win; Yellow = draw; Red = away team win.

=== Copa Libertadores ===
==== First stage ====
Group 4 standings
Pos	Team	Pld	W	D	L	GF	GA	GD	Pts	Qualification	(Chile) COB	(Chile) CC	(Ecuador) LDQ	(Ecuador) BSC
1	(Chile) Cobreloa	6	3	3	0	9	2	+7	9	Qualified to the Semi-Finals	—	2–0	3–1	3–0
2	(Chile) Colo-Colo	6	3	2	1	8	5	+3	8		0–0	—	1–0	2–0
3	(Ecuador) LDU Quito	6	1	2	3	8	12	−4	4		0–0	2–2	—	4–2
4	(Ecuador) Barcelona	6	1	1	4	8	14	−6	3		1–1	1–3	4–1	—

Legend: Blue = home team win; Yellow = draw; Red = away team win.

March 7 First Stage	Barcelona (Ecuador)	4–1	(Ecuador) L.D.U. Quito	Guayaquil, Ecuador
	Paulo César 1', 67'; Alcides de Oliveira 21' (pen.), 57'	Report	Armendáriz 74'	Stadium: Estadio Modelo Alberto Spencer; Referee: Jorge Orellana (Ecuador)

March 14 First Stage	L.D.U. Quito (Ecuador)	4–2	(Ecuador) Barcelona	Quito, Ecuador
	Vaca 30'; Carrera 33'; Porras 47'; Armendáriz 60'	Report	Paulo César 67'; Alcides de Oliveira 79' (pen.)	Stadium: Estadio Olímpico Atahualpa; Referee: Adolfo Quirola (Ecuador)

August 18 First Stage	L.D.U. Quito (Ecuador)	2–2	(Chile) Colo-Colo	Quito, Ecuador
	Moreno 38'; Pavón 43'	Report	Vasconcelos 29'; Caszely 32'	Stadium: Estadio Olímpico Atahualpa; Referee: Romualdo Arppi Filho (Brazil)

August 22 First Stage	L.D.U. Quito (Ecuador)	0–0	(Chile) Cobreloa	Quito, Ecuador
		Report		Stadium: Estadio Olímpico Atahualpa; Referee: Jorge Antequera (Bolivia)

September 7 First Stage	Colo-Colo (Chile)	1–0	(Ecuador) L.D.U. Quito	Santiago, Chile
	Rivas 13'	Report		Stadium: Estadio Nacional; Referee: Arturo Ithurralde (Argentina)

September 10 First Stage	Cobreloa (Chile)	3–1	(Ecuador) L.D.U. Quito	Calama, Chile
	Letelier 26', 74'; Merello 70'	Report	Porras 88'	Stadium: Estadio Municipal de Calama; Referee: Jorge Eduardo Romero (Argentina)
