= 1977 Liga Deportiva Universitaria de Quito season =

L.D.U. Quito
1977 season
- President: Rodrigo Paz
- Manager: Miguel Ortega
- Stadium: Estadio Olímpico Atahualpa
- Serie A: Runner-up
- Top goalscorer: Rubén Scalise (16 goals)
Home colours	Away colours

Liga Deportiva Universitaria de Quito's 1977 season was the club's 47th year of existence, the 24th year in professional football and the 17th in the top level of professional football in Ecuador.

== Squad ==
No.	Pos.	Nation	Player
—	GK	ECU	Adolfo Bolaños
—	GK	ECU	Patricio Gallardo
—	GK	ARG	Mario Quiroga
—	DF	URU	Luis De Carlos
—	DF	ECU	Alfredo Encalada
—	DF	ECU	Ángel Granja
—	DF	ECU	Mauricio King
—	DF	ECU	Marco Moreno
—	DF	ECU	Andrés Nazareno
—	DF	ECU	Fernando Villena
—	DF	ECU	Patricio Maldonado
—	MF	ECU	Fabián Cáceres

No.	Pos.	Nation	Player
—	MF	ECU	Polo Carrera (captain)
—	MF	ECU	Patricio Moscoso
—	MF	ECU	Juan Rivadeneira
—	MF	ARG	Francisco Rivadero
—	MF	ECU	Roberto Sussman
—	MF	ECU	Jorge Tapia
—	MF	ECU	José Vélez
—	MF	ECU	Juan Yánez
—	FW	ECU	José Cruz
—	FW	ECU	Segundo Rodríguez
—	FW	ARG	Rubén Scalise
—	FW	ECU	Hernán Vaca

== Competitions ==
=== Serie A ===
==== First stage ====
Pos	Team	Pld	W	D	L	GF	GA	GD	Pts	Qualification or relegation
1	L.D.U. Quito	18	8	9	1	27	13	+14	25	Qualified to the Liguilla Final
2	Universidad Católica	18	8	6	4	32	21	+11	22	Qualified to the Liguilla Final
3	Emelec	18	9	4	5	25	19	+6	22	Qualified to the Liguilla Final
4	Barcelona	18	6	9	3	24	16	+8	21	
5	Deportivo Cuenca	18	8	4	6	25	25	0	20	
6	L.D.U. Portoviejo	18	8	3	7	30	25	+5	19	
7	El Nacional	18	6	4	8	20	19	+1	16	
8	Carmen Mora	18	6	3	9	19	27	−8	15	
9	Aucas	18	5	5	8	16	27	−11	15	Relegated to the Serie B
10	América de Quito	18	1	3	14	7	33	−26	5	Relegated to the Serie B

===== Results =====
Home \ Away	CDA	SDA	BSC	CME	CDC	EN	CSE	LDP	LDQ	UC
América de Quito									1–2	
Aucas									1–1	
Barcelona									0–0	
Carmen Mora									1–1	
Deportivo Cuenca									2–2	
El Nacional									2–1	
Emelec									0–0	
L.D.U. Portoviejo									2–2	
L.D.U. Quito	3–0	3–0	0–0	2–0	3–1	1–1	1–0	4–2		1–0
Universidad Católica									0–0	

Source: RSSSF
Legend: Blue = home team win; Yellow = draw; Red = away team win.

==== Second stage ====
Pos	Team	Pld	W	D	L	GF	GA	GD	Pts	Qualification or relegation
1	Barcelona	18	11	2	5	29	20	+9	24	Qualified to the Liguilla Final
2	El Nacional	18	9	4	5	33	18	+15	22	Qualified to the Liguilla Final
3	Deportivo Cuenca	18	8	4	6	28	20	+8	20	Qualified to the Liguilla Final
4	L.D.U. Portoviejo	18	8	4	6	30	27	+3	20	
5	Emelec	18	8	3	7	28	23	+5	19	
6	Universidad Católica	18	7	5	6	27	24	+3	19	
7	Manta Sport	18	7	4	7	30	31	−1	18	
8	L.D.U. Quito	18	5	7	6	16	20	−4	17	
9	Carmen Mora	18	4	6	8	14	29	−15	14	Relegated to the Serie B
10	L.D.U. Cuenca	18	1	5	12	17	40	−23	7	Relegated to the Serie B

===== Results =====
Home \ Away	BSC	CME	CDC	EN	CSE	LDC	LDP	LDQ	MSC	UC
Barcelona								1–0		
Carmen Mora								1–1		
Deportivo Cuenca								0–0		
El Nacional								1–0		
Emelec								3–0		
L.D.U. Cuenca								1–1		
L.D.U. Portoviejo								4–0		
L.D.U. Quito	1–1	5–0	1–1	1–0	0–2	1–0	0–0		2–1	0–0
Manta Sport								0–1		
Universidad Católica								4–2		

Source: RSSSF
Legend: Blue = home team win; Yellow = draw; Red = away team win.

==== Liguilla Final ====
Pos	Team	Pld	W	D	L	GF	GA	GD	Pts	Qualification
1	El Nacional	10	6	4	0	17	4	+13	18 (Note: Includes bonus points earned in previous stages: Barcelona & LDU Quito (3); El Nacional & U. Católica (2); D. Cuenca & Emelec (1).)	Champions and Qualified to the 1978 Copa Libertadores
2	L.D.U. Quito	10	4	2	4	11	14	−3	13	Qualified to the 1978 Copa Libertadores
3	Universidad Católica	10	4	2	4	14	19	−5	12	
4	Barcelona	10	3	2	5	16	15	+1	11	
5	Emelec	10	2	4	4	12	15	−3	9	
6	Deportivo Cuenca	10	2	4	4	14	17	−3	9	

===== Results =====
Home \ Away	BSC	CDC	EN	CSE	LDQ	UC
Barcelona					5–0	
Deportivo Cuenca					0–0	
El Nacional					2–1	
Emelec					1–0	
L.D.U. Quito	3–0	2–1	0–0	2–1		3–2
Universidad Católica					2–0	

Source: RSSSF
Legend: Blue = home team win; Yellow = draw; Red = away team win.
