= 1986 Liga Deportiva Universitaria de Quito season =

L.D.U. Quito
1986 season
- President: Raúl Vaca
- Manager: Leonel Montoya
- Stadium: Estadio Olímpico Atahualpa
- Serie A: 8th
- Top goalscorer: José Vicente Moreno (15 goals)
Home colours	Away colours

Liga Deportiva Universitaria de Quito's 1986 season was the club's 56th year of existence, the 33rd year in professional football and the 26th in the top level of professional football in Ecuador.

== Kits ==
Sponsor(s): Mutualista Pichincha

== Competitions ==
=== Serie A ===
==== First stage ====
Group 2
Pos	Team	Pld	W	D	L	GF	GA	GD	Pts	Qualification
1	El Nacional	14	9	3	2	33	11	+22	21	Qualified to the Third Stage
2	Filanbanco	14	8	4	2	23	14	+9	20	Qualified to the Third Stage
3	L.D.U. Quito	14	8	3	3	28	16	+12	19	Qualified to the Third Stage
4	Esmeraldas Petrolero	14	5	4	5	16	16	0	14	
5	Técnico Universitario	14	4	4	6	14	17	−3	12	
6	Deportivo Cuenca	14	4	4	6	12	17	−5	12	
7	L.D.U. Portoviejo	14	4	1	9	14	36	−22	9	
8	9 de Octubre	14	2	1	11	13	16	−3	5	Qualified to the Liguilla del No Descenso

===== Results =====
Home \ Away	CDC	EN	EP	CDF	LDP	LDQ	TU	9DO
Deportivo Cuenca						1–0		
El Nacional						3–0		
Esmeraldas Petrolero						1–1		
Filanbanco						0–1		
L.D.U. Portoviejo						2–4		
L.D.U. Quito	2–1	3–1	2–0	2–4	7–0		1–1	3–2
Técnico Universitario						0–0		
9 de Octubre						0–2		

Source: RSSSF
Legend: Blue = home team win; Yellow = draw; Red = away team win.

==== Second stage ====
Group 2
Pos	Team	Pld	W	D	L	GF	GA	GD	Pts	Qualification
1	Técnico Universitario	14	8	3	3	17	12	+5	19	Qualified to the Third Stage
2	El Nacional	14	6	5	3	21	13	+8	17	Qualified to the Third Stage
3	Audaz Octubrino	14	6	4	4	12	11	+1	16	Qualified to the Third Stage
4	Emelec	14	6	2	6	15	13	+2	14	
5	América de Quito	14	4	5	5	19	16	+3	13	
6	L.D.U. Quito	14	5	3	6	12	14	−2	13	
7	Macará	14	6	0	8	22	23	−1	12	
8	L.D.U. Portoviejo	14	2	4	8	14	30	−16	8	Qualified to the Liguilla del No Descenso

===== Results =====
Home \ Away	CDA	AO	EN	CSE	LDP	LDQ	MAC	TU
América de Quito						0–0		
Audaz Octubrino						2–0		
El Nacional						1–0		
Emelec						2–0		
L.D.U. Portoviejo						2–0		
L.D.U. Quito	1–1	1–0	1–1	2–0	2–0		2–1	1–0
Macará						2–1		
Técnico Universitario						2–1		

Source: RSSSF
Legend: Blue = home team win; Yellow = draw; Red = away team win.

==== Third stage ====
Group 1
Pos	Team	Pld	W	D	L	GF	GA	GD	Pts	Qualification
1	Deportivo Cuenca	10	6	3	1	15	5	+10	15	Qualified to the Liguilla Final
2	Técnico Universitario	10	5	3	2	14	9	+5	14.5 (Note: Includes bonus points earned in previous stages: D. Quito (2.5); T. Universitario (1.5); Emelec (1); LDU Quito (0.5).)	Qualified to the Liguilla Final
3	Deportivo Quito	10	3	5	2	16	10	+6	13.5	
4	Emelec	10	4	1	5	13	13	0	10	
5	L.D.U. Quito	10	2	5	3	10	12.5	−2.5	9	
6	Deportivo Quevedo	10	0	3	7	5	24	−19	3	

===== Results =====
Home \ Away	CDC	CDQ	SDQ	CSE	LDQ	TU
Deportivo Cuenca					0–0	
Deportivo Quevedo					1–1	
Deportivo Quito					3–3	
Emelec					2–0	
L.D.U. Quito	0–2	3–1	1–1	1–0		0–0
Técnico Universitario					2–1	

Source: RSSSF
Legend: Blue = home team win; Yellow = draw; Red = away team win.
