= 1988 Liga Deportiva Universitaria de Quito season =

L.D.U. Quito
1988 season
- President: Raúl Vaca
- Manager: Juan Hohberg
- Stadium: Estadio Olímpico Atahualpa
- Serie A: 3rd
- Top goalscorer: Janio Pinto (19 goals)
Home colours	Away colours

Liga Deportiva Universitaria de Quito's 1988 season was the club's 58th year of existence, the 35th year in professional football and the 28th in the top level of professional football in Ecuador.

== Kits ==
Sponsor(s): Banco de la Producción

== Competitions ==
=== Serie A ===
==== First stage ====
Pos	Team	Pld	W	D	L	GF	GA	GD	Pts	Qualification or relegation
1	L.D.U. Quito	34	20	9	5	64	36	+28	49	Qualified to the Second Stage
2	Emelec	34	16	12	6	56	36	+20	44	Qualified to the Second Stage
3	Macará	34	13	15	6	50	32	+18	41	Qualified to the Second Stage
4	Barcelona	34	13	14	7	50	25	+25	40	Qualified to the Second Stage
5	Deportivo Quito	34	13	13	8	48	43	+5	39	Qualified to the Second Stage
6	Universidad Católica	34	13	10	11	45	37	+8	36	Qualified to the Second Stage
7	Filanbanco	34	14	8	12	38	33	+5	36	Qualified to the Second Stage
8	El Nacional	34	12	11	11	49	41	+8	35	Qualified to the Second Stage
9	Técnico Universitario	34	11	12	11	42	39	+3	34	
10	Aucas	34	11	12	11	45	49	−4	34	
11	Deportivo Cuenca	34	7	19	8	41	45	−4	33	
12	Esmeraldas Petrolero	34	11	10	13	40	50	−10	32	
13	Audaz Octubrino	34	12	7	15	32	43	−11	31	
14	Deportivo Quevedo	34	10	8	16	27	44	−17	28	
15	Juventus	34	7	13	14	31	44	−13	27	
16	L.D.U. Portoviejo	34	9	9	16	34	50	−16	27	
17	River Plate	34	9	7	18	27	53	−26	25	
18	América de Quito	34	5	11	18	29	48	−19	21	Relegated to the Segunda Categoría

===== Results =====
Home \ Away	CDA	SDA	AO	BSC	CDC	CDQ	SDQ	EN	CSE	EP	CDF	JUV	LDP	LDQ	MAC	RPR	TU	UC
América de Quito														1–4				
Aucas														2–3				
Audaz Octubrino														3–0				
Barcelona														1–1				
Deportivo Cuenca														1–3				
Deportivo Quevedo														0–0				
Deportivo Quito														2–2				
El Nacional														2–2				
Emelec														2–0				
Esmeraldas Petrolero														1–1				
Filanbanco														1–2				
Juventus														2–1				
L.D.U. Portoviejo														2–1				
L.D.U. Quito	2–0	1–0	3–1	3–1	3–1	4–0	5–3	1–1	3–1	2–0	2–1	3–1	2–0		1–0	2–2	1–1	2–1
Macará														0–0				
River Plate														0–2				
Técnico Universitario														1–2				
Universidad Católica														1–0				

Source: RSSSF
Legend: Blue = home team win; Yellow = draw; Red = away team win.

==== Second stage ====
Group 1
Pos	Team	Pld	W	D	L	GF	GA	GD	Pts	Qualification
1	Deportivo Quito	6	2	4	0	8	4	+4	8	Qualified to the Finals
2	L.D.U. Quito	6	3	1	2	10	11	−1	8 (Note: Includes bonus points earned in previous stages: LDU Quito (1).)	
3	Macará	6	2	2	2	11	8	+3	6	
4	Filanbanco	6	1	1	4	5	11	−6	3	

===== Results =====
Home \ Away	SDQ	CDF	LDQ	MAC
Deportivo Quito			3–1	
Filanbanco			2–3	
L.D.U. Quito	0–0	3–1		2–0
Macará			5–1	

Source: RSSSF
Legend: Blue = home team win; Yellow = draw; Red = away team win.
