= Gilson de Souza =

Ecuadorian footballer (born 1967)

Personal information
- Full name: Gilson Simões de Souza
- Date of birth: 25 March 1967 (age 59)
- Place of birth: Duque de Caxias, Brazil
- Height: 1.84 m (6 ft 0 in)
- Position: Midfielder

Youth career
- 1985: Americano

Senior career*
Years	Team	Apps	(Gls)
1985–1989	Americano		
1989	Vasco da Gama		
1990	Filanbanco		
1991	Louletano D.C.		
1991	Valdez		
1992–1993	Barcelona SC		
1993	Atlético Paranaense		
1994	L.D.U. Quito		
1995–1997	Barcelona SC		
1997–1998	Al-Hilal FC		
1998–1999	Al-Ahli Saudi FC		
1999–2000	Al Rayyan SC		
2000–2001	Qatar Club		
2001	Al Ettifaq		
2002–2003	Al Qadeseiya		

International career
1996–1997	Ecuador	17	(1)
- * Club domestic league appearances and goals

Gilson Simões de Souza (born 25 March 1967) is a former professional footballer who played as a midfielder. He is best known for his spell at Barcelona SC where he was a fan favourite. Born in Brazil, Gilson played for the Ecuador national team.

== Club career ==
Gilson began his playing career in Brazil where he played for Atlético Paranaense and Vasco da Gama.

== International career ==
He made 17 appearances for the Ecuador national football team from 1996 to 1997.

List of international goals scored by Gilson de Souza
No.	Date	Venue	Opponent	Score	Result	Competition	Ref.
1	31 January 1993	Estadio Reales Tamarindos, Portoviejo, Ecuador	Armenia	1–0	3–0	Friendly	
