= 1980 Liga Deportiva Universitaria de Quito season =

L.D.U. Quito
1980 season
- President: Oswaldo Núñez Moreno
- Manager: Juan Araujo; Carlos Ríos
- Stadium: Estadio Olímpico Atahualpa
- Serie A: 6th
- Top goalscorer: Néstor Juan Doroni (14 goals)
Home colours	Away colours

Liga Deportiva Universitaria de Quito's 1980 season was the club's 50th year of existence, the 27th year in professional football, the 20th in the top level of professional football in Ecuador.

== Kits ==
Sponsor(s): Kodak, Ecuacolor

== Competitions ==
=== Serie A ===
==== First stage ====
Pos	Team	Pld	W	D	L	GF	GA	GD	Pts	Qualification or relegation
1	Universidad Católica	18	8	5	5	28	21	+7	21	Qualified to the Liguilla Final
2	Técnico Universitario	18	7	6	5	26	21	+5	20	Qualified to the Liguilla Final
3	Barcelona	18	7	6	5	25	21	+4	20	Qualified to the Liguilla Final
4	Emelec	18	7	5	6	22	18	+4	19	
5	América de Quito	18	6	6	6	21	23	−2	18	
6	L.D.U. Quito	18	4	9	5	23	21	+2	17	
7	El Nacional	18	6	5	7	18	19	−1	17	
8	Everest	18	6	5	7	23	29	−6	17	
9	Manta Sport	18	8	1	9	20	28	−8	17	Relegated to the Serie B
10	Deportivo Cuenca	18	5	4	9	14	19	−5	14	Relegated to the Serie B

===== Results =====
Home \ Away	CDA	BSC	CDC	EN	CSE	CDE	LDQ	MSC	TU	UC
América de Quito							3–2			
Barcelona							1–0			
Deportivo Cuenca							1–1			
El Nacional							0–2			
Emelec							1–1			
Everest							1–0			
L.D.U. Quito	1–1	1–1	1–0	2–2	1–1	2–2		5–0	1–1	1–0
Manta Sport							1–0			
Técnico Universitario							1–1			
Universidad Católica							4–1			

Source: RSSSF
Legend: Blue = home team win; Yellow = draw; Red = away team win.

==== Second stage ====
Pos	Team	Pld	W	D	L	GF	GA	GD	Pts	Qualification or relegation
1	El Nacional	18	8	8	2	24	16	+8	24	Qualified to the Liguilla Final
2	Barcelona	18	8	6	4	29	20	+9	22	Qualified to the Liguilla Final
3	América de Quito	18	9	4	5	23	15	+8	22	Qualified to the Liguilla Final
4	Universidad Católica	18	7	7	4	25	13	+12	21	
5	Técnico Universitario	18	7	3	8	29	28	+1	17	
6	L.D.U. Quito	18	4	9	5	21	24	−3	17	
7	Everest	18	4	8	6	22	30	−8	16	
8	Deportivo Quito	18	5	4	9	18	20	−2	14	
9	Emelec	18	4	6	8	13	21	−8	14	Relegated to the Serie B
10	L.D.U. Cuenca	18	5	3	10	7	24	−17	13	Relegated to the Serie B

===== Results =====
Home \ Away	CDA	BSC	SDQ	EN	CSE	CDE	LDC	LDQ	TU	UC
América de Quito								1–1		
Barcelona								1–0		
Deportivo Quito								1–2		
El Nacional								1–1		
Emelec								0–1		
Everest								3–3		
L.D.U. Cuenca								2–0		
L.D.U. Quito	1–1	2–2	2–2	1–3	1–1	0–0	3–0		1–0	1–1
Técnico Universitario								2–1		
Universidad Católica								3–0		

Source: RSSSF
Legend: Blue = home team win; Yellow = draw; Red = away team win.
