= 1983 Liga Deportiva Universitaria de Quito season =

L.D.U. Quito
1983 season
- President: José Cueva Velásquez
- Manager: César Muñoz; Gustavo de Simone
- Stadium: Estadio Olímpico Atahualpa
- Serie A: 7th
- Top goalscorer: Alcides de Oliveira (23 goals)
Home colours	Away colours

Liga Deportiva Universitaria de Quito's 1983 season was the club's 53rd year of existence, the 30th year in professional football and the 23rd in the top level of professional football in Ecuador.

== Kits ==
Sponsor(s): Banco Popular

== Competitions ==
=== Serie A ===
==== First stage ====
Pos	Team	Pld	W	D	L	GF	GA	GD	Pts	Qualification
1	El Nacional	26	17	2	7	62	25	+37	36	Qualified to the Liguilla Final
2	9 de Octubre	26	15	3	8	43	34	+9	33	Qualified to the Liguilla Final
3	L.D.U. Portoviejo	26	13	5	8	45	34	+11	31	Qualified to the Liguilla Final
4	Barcelona	26	13	4	9	34	24	+10	30	
5	Manta Sport	26	13	3	10	41	39	+2	29	
6	L.D.U. Quito	26	10	7	9	48	34	+14	27	
7	Técnico Universitario	26	13	1	12	40	36	+4	27	
8	Emelec	26	9	8	9	30	32	−2	26	
9	Universidad Católica	26	9	7	10	31	31	0	25	Qualified to the Liguilla del No Descenso
10	Aucas	26	9	6	11	38	44	−6	24	Qualified to the Liguilla del No Descenso
11	Deportivo Quito	26	7	8	11	31	48	−17	22	Qualified to the Liguilla del No Descenso
12	Deportivo Quevedo	26	7	7	12	22	30	−8	21	Qualified to the Liguilla del No Descenso
13	América de Quito	26	8	4	14	32	44	−12	20	Qualified to the Liguilla del No Descenso
14	Everest	26	4	5	17	25	67	−42	13	Qualified to the Liguilla del No Descenso

===== Results =====
Home \ Away	CDA	SDA	BSC	CDQ	SDQ	EN	CSE	CDE	LDP	LDQ	MSC	TU	UC	9DO
América de Quito										3–1				
Aucas										1–2				
Barcelona										2–1				
Deportivo Quevedo										2–1				
Deportivo Quito										4–4				
El Nacional										3–1				
Emelec										2–1				
Everest										0–0				
L.D.U. Portoviejo										2–1				
L.D.U. Quito	0–0	3–1	2–0	4–2	3–0	2–2	2–1	10–0	2–1		0–0	1–1	0–0	2–0
Manta Sport										2–1				
Técnico Universitario										4–3				
Universidad Católica										0–1				
9 de Octubre										1–0				

Source: RSSSF
Legend: Blue = home team win; Yellow = draw; Red = away team win.

==== Second stage ====
Pos	Team	Pld	W	D	L	GF	GA	GD	Pts	Qualification
1	Barcelona	14	8	2	4	23	11	+12	18	Qualified to the Liguilla Final
2	El Nacional	14	7	2	5	17	12	+5	16	Qualified to the Liguilla Final
3	Técnico Universitario	14	7	1	6	24	23	+1	15	Qualified to the Liguilla Final
4	Manta Sport	14	5	4	5	19	18	+1	14	
5	L.D.U. Quito	14	5	4	5	16	17	−1	14	
6	L.D.U. Portoviejo	14	6	2	6	18	25	−7	14	
7	9 de Octubre	14	4	4	6	19	23	−4	12	
8	Emelec	14	2	5	7	20	27	−7	9	

===== Results =====
Home \ Away	BSC	EN	CSE	LDP	LDQ	MSC	TU	9DO
Barcelona					2–0			
El Nacional					1–0			
Emelec					1–1			
L.D.U. Portoviejo					2–1			
L.D.U. Quito	1–0	2–1	2–1	1–1		2–0	2–1	2–2
Manta Sport					2–0			
Técnico Universitario					2–1			
9 de Octubre					1–1			

Source: RSSSF
Legend: Blue = home team win; Yellow = draw; Red = away team win.
