= 1968 Liga Deportiva Universitaria de Quito season =

L.D.U. Quito
1968 season
- President: Héctor Merino; Francisco De Paula
- Manager: José María Ocampo; José Gómez Nogueira
- Stadium: Estadio Olímpico Atahualpa
- Serie A: 4th
- Top goalscorer: Miguel Salazar (10 goals)
Home colours	Away colours

Liga Deportiva Universitaria de Quito's 1968 season was the club's 38th year of existence, the 15th year in professional football and the 9th in the top level of professional football in Ecuador.

== Competitions ==
=== Serie A ===
==== First stage ====
Pos	Team	Pld	W	D	L	GF	GA	GD	Pts	Qualification
2	Barcelona	22	11	5	6	29	16	+13	27	Qualified to the Liguilla Final
3	Emelec	22	11	5	6	37	27	+10	27	Qualified to the Liguilla Final
4	LDU Quito	22	10	6	6	36	19	+17	26	Qualified to the Liguilla Final
5	Manta	22	8	6	8	26	22	+4	22	Qualified to the Liguilla Final
6	El Nacional	22	6	9	7	29	25	+4	21	Qualified to the Liguilla Final

Source: RSSSF - 1968 Serie A

===== Results =====
Home \ Away	CDA	SDA	BSC	SDQ	EN	CSE	ENV	CDE	LDU	MAC	MSC	CDP
América de Quito									0–3			
Aucas									2–1			
Barcelona									0–1			
Deportivo Quito									3–0			
El Nacional									1–1			
Emelec									2–1			
Estibadores Navales									2–1			
Everest									1–0			
L.D.U. Quito	1–1	3–0	1–0	2–2	0–0	2–0	2–0	1–0		7–1	5–1	2–0
Macará									0–0			
Manta									1–0			
Politécnico									2–2			

Source: RSSSF
Legend: Blue = home team win; Yellow = draw; Red = away team win.

==== Liguilla Final ====
Pos	Team	Pld	W	D	L	GF	GA	GD	Pts	Qualification
2	Barcelona	32	18	7	7	44	24	+20	43	Qualified to the 1969 Copa Libertadores
3	Emelec	32	16	6	10	48	41	+7	38	
4	LDU Quito	32	14	9	9	53	29	+24	37	
5	El Nacional	32	7	14	11	36	35	+1	28	
6	Manta	32	9	10	13	34	34	0	28	

Source: RSSSF - 1968 Serie A

===== Results =====
Home \ Away	BSC	SDQ	EN	CSE	LDU	MSC
Barcelona					1–0	
Deportivo Quito					0–0	
El Nacional					1–2	
Emelec					2–0	
L.D.U. Quito	2–3	4–0	0–0	5–0		3–2
Manta					1–1	

Source: RSSSF
Legend: Blue = home team win; Yellow = draw; Red = away team win.
