= 1981 Liga Deportiva Universitaria de Quito season =

L.D.U. Quito
1981 season
- President: Rubén Chávez del Pozo
- Manager: Luis Grimaldi
- Stadium: Estadio Olímpico Atahualpa
- Serie A: Runner-up
- Top goalscorer: Paulo César (25 goals)
Home colours	Away colours

Liga Deportiva Universitaria de Quito's 1981 season was the club's 51st year of existence, the 28th year in professional football and the 21st in the top level of professional football in Ecuador.

== Kits ==
Supplier: Adidas
Sponsor(s): Banco Popular

== Squad ==
No.	Pos.	Nation	Player
—	GK	ECU	Adolfo Bolaños
—	GK	ECU	Patricio Gallardo
—	GK	ECU	Fernando Moya
—	DF	ECU	Luis Corrales
—	DF	ECU	Ecuador Figueroa (captain)
—	DF	ECU	Mario Floril
—	DF	ECU	Mauricio King
—	DF	ECU	Pablo López
—	DF	ECU	Marco Moreno
—	DF	ECU	Juan Ruales
—	DF	ECU	Fabián Sandoval
—	DF	ECU	Homero Valencia
—	MF	ECU	Ricardo Armendáriz
—	MF	ECU	Fabián Cáceres

No.	Pos.	Nation	Player
—	MF	ECU	Ángel Granja
—	MF	URU	Nelson Moraes
—	MF	ECU	Patricio Ortíz
—	MF	ECU	David Tapia
—	MF	ECU	René Tobar
—	MF	ECU	Luis Eduardo Vaca
—	MF	ECU	Juan Yánez
—	FW	ECU	José Cruz
—	FW	URU	José María Figueroa
—	FW	URU	Carlos Larrañaga
—	FW	ECU	José Vicente Moreno
—	FW	ECU	Patricio Moscoso
—	FW	URU	Aníbal Pastorino
—	FW	BRA	Paulo César

== Competitions ==
=== Serie A ===
==== First stage ====
Pos	Team	Pld	W	D	L	GF	GA	GD	Pts	Qualification or relegation
1	Barcelona	18	11	3	4	29	14	+15	25	Qualified to the Liguilla Final
2	L.D.U. Quito	18	10	5	3	27	18	+9	25	Qualified to the Liguilla Final
3	El Nacional	18	7	6	5	17	16	+1	20	Qualified to the Liguilla Final
4	Universidad Católica	18	6	6	6	26	21	+5	18	
5	Deportivo Cuenca	18	5	6	7	15	19	−4	16	
6	América de Quito	18	6	4	8	21	27	−6	16	
7	Everest	18	7	2	9	27	33	−6	16	
8	Deportivo Quito	18	6	4	8	17	24	−7	16	
9	Técnico Universitario	18	6	2	10	19	22	−3	14	Relegated to the Serie B
10	L.D.U. Portoviejo	18	5	4	9	26	30	−4	14	Relegated to the Serie B

===== Results =====
Home \ Away	CDA	BSC	CDC	SDQ	EN	CDE	LDP	LDQ	TU	UC
América de Quito								1–2		
Barcelona								1–0		
Deportivo Cuenca								0–0		
Deportivo Quito								2–3		
El Nacional								0–1		
Everest								2–0		
L.D.U. Portoviejo								2–3		
L.D.U. Quito	1–0	1–0	2–1	2–0	3–3	3–0	2–2		1–0	2–2
Técnico Universitario								1–0		
Universidad Católica								1–1		

Source: RSSSF
Legend: Blue = home team win; Yellow = draw; Red = away team win.

==== Second stage ====
Pos	Team	Pld	W	D	L	GF	GA	GD	Pts	Qualification or relegation
1	Barcelona	18	8	5	5	32	23	+9	21	Qualified to the Liguilla Final
2	L.D.U. Quito	18	8	4	6	28	20	+8	20	Qualified to the Liguilla Final
3	El Nacional	18	6	6	6	24	18	+6	18	Qualified to the Liguilla Final
4	9 de Octubre	18	7	4	7	24	22	+2	18	
5	Universidad Católica	18	7	4	7	22	20	+2	18	
6	Everest	18	5	8	5	25	33	−8	18	
7	Deportivo Quito	18	7	3	8	28	28	0	17	
8	Emelec	18	6	5	7	29	33	−4	17	
9	Deportivo Cuenca	18	7	3	8	23	35	−12	17	Relegated to the Serie B
10	América de Quito	18	4	8	6	18	21	−3	16	Relegated to the Serie B

===== Results =====
Home \ Away	CDA	BSC	CDC	SDQ	EN	CSE	CDE	LDQ	UC	9DO
América de Quito								2–1		
Barcelona								2–0		
Deportivo Cuenca								1–2		
Deportivo Quito								2–1		
El Nacional								1–1		
Emelec								3–1		
Everest								1–1		
L.D.U. Quito	2–2	2–0	1–2	1–0	1–0	2–0	4–0		1–1	5–0
Universidad Católica								0–2		
9 de Octubre								3–0		

Source: RSSSF
Legend: Blue = home team win; Yellow = draw; Red = away team win.

==== Liguilla Final ====
Pos	Team	Pld	W	D	L	GF	GA	GD	Pts	Qualification
1	Barcelona	4	2	0	2	6	6	0	10 (Note: Includes bonus points earned in previous stages: Barcelona (6); LDU Quito (4); El Nacional (2).)	Champions and Qualified to the 1982 Copa Libertadores
2	L.D.U. Quito	4	1	1	2	8	11	−3	7	
3	El Nacional	4	2	1	1	9	6	+3	7	

===== Results =====
Home \ Away	BSC	EN	LDQ
Barcelona			2–1
El Nacional			5–2
L.D.U. Quito	3–2	2–2	

Source: RSSSF
Legend: Blue = home team win; Yellow = draw; Red = away team win.

==== 2nd Place Playoff ====
Pos	Team	Pld	W	D	L	GF	GA	GD	Pts	Qualification
1	L.D.U. Quito	2	1	1	0	4	3	+1	3	Qualified to the 1982 Copa Libertadores
2	El Nacional	2	0	1	1	3	4	−1	1	

===== Results =====
Home \ Away	EN	LDQ
El Nacional		2–2
L.D.U. Quito	2–1	

Source: RSSSF
Legend: Blue = home team win; Yellow = draw; Red = away team win.
