= 1971 Campeonato Ecuatoriano de Fútbol Serie A =

Ecuadorian Serie A
- Season: 1971
- Champions: Barcelona

The 1971 Campeonato Ecuatoriano de Fútbol Serie A, the first division of Ecuadorian football (soccer), was played by 16 teams. The champion was Barcelona.

== First stage ==
Group A
Pos	Team	Pld	W	D	L	GF	GA	GD	Pts	Qualification
1	Emelec	14	8	5	1	30	12	+18	21	Qualified to the Liguilla Final
2	El Nacional	14	8	3	3	27	15	+12	19	Qualified to the Liguilla Final
3	Deportivo Cuenca	14	7	4	3	21	16	+5	18	Qualified to the Liguilla Final
4	América de Quito	14	7	3	4	24	19	+5	17	Qualified to the Liguilla Final
5	Politécnico	14	3	6	5	20	19	+1	12	Qualified to the Liguilla del No Descenso
6	Macará	14	4	4	6	22	24	−2	12	Qualified to the Liguilla del No Descenso
7	Juventud Italiana	14	3	6	5	17	26	−9	12	Qualified to the Liguilla del No Descenso
8	Norte América	14	0	1	13	9	40	−31	1	Qualified to the Liguilla del No Descenso

Source: RSSSF - 1971 Serie A

Home \ Away	CDA	CDC	CSE	EN	JUV	MAC	NOR	CDP
América de Quito		1–3	3–0	1–0	0–0	2–0	2–1	2–1
Deportivo Cuenca	3–2		0–0	2–2	3–0	1–0	2–0	1–1
Emelec	3–0	3–1		3–0	2–2	2–0	4–1	1–0
El Nacional	2–1	1–0	1–1		4–0	4–0	3–0	2–2
Juventud Italiana	2–2	0–1	2–2	1–0		4–3	3–1	1–1
Macará	1–1	4–1	1–1	2–4	3–1		3–1	1–1
Norte América	1–3	1–2	0–6	2–3	1–1	0–3		0–4
Politécnico	2–4	1–1	1–2	1–3	3–0	1–1	1–0	

Source: RSSSF - 1971 Serie A
Legend: Blue = home team win; Yellow = draw; Red = away team win.

Group B
Pos	Team	Pld	W	D	L	GF	GA	GD	Pts	Qualification
1	Universidad Católica	14	8	3	3	28	13	+15	19	Qualified to the Liguilla Final
2	LDU Quito	14	6	5	3	23	14	+9	17	Qualified to the Liguilla Final
3	Barcelona	14	7	3	4	21	14	+7	17	Qualified to the Liguilla Final
4	LDU Portoviejo	14	4	8	2	25	19	+6	16	Qualified to the Liguilla Final
5	Deportivo Quito	14	5	3	6	22	25	−3	13	Qualified to the Liguilla del No Descenso
6	Brasil	14	5	3	6	10	22	−12	13	Qualified to the Liguilla del No Descenso
7	9 de Octubre	14	5	2	7	19	26	−7	12	Qualified to the Liguilla del No Descenso
8	Olmedo	14	1	3	10	8	23	−15	5	Qualified to the Liguilla del No Descenso

Source: RSSSF - 1971 Serie A

Home \ Away	9DO	BSC	BRA	SDQ	LDP	LDQ	CDO	UC
9 de Octubre		1–1	2–0	2–1	2–2	2–1	2–1	2–0
Barcelona	1–0		3–1	3–0	1–0	1–0	3–0	1–1
Brasil	1–0	3–2		1–1	1–1	0–0	1–0	1–0
Deportivo Quito	3–2	2–0	3–0		1–1	1–3	2–0	1–3
LDU Portoviejo	5–3	1–1	4–0	3–1		2–2	1–1	3–0
LDU Quito	4–0	2–1	3–0	4–2	1–1		1–1	1–1
Olmedo	2–1	0–2	0–1	1–2	1–1	0–1		1–3
Universidad Católica	4–0	3–1	3–0	2–2	4–0	2–0	2–0	

Source: RSSSF - 1971 Serie A
Legend: Blue = home team win; Yellow = draw; Red = away team win.

== Liguilla del No Descenso ==
Pos	Team	Pld	W	D	L	GF	GA	GD	Pts	Relegation
1	Macará	14	7	4	3	23	12	+11	18	
2	Olmedo	14	6	5	3	24	17	+7	17	
3	9 de Octubre	14	7	3	4	23	18	+5	17	Relegated to Serie B
4	Deportivo Quito	14	6	4	4	25	16	+9	16	Relegated to Serie B
5	Politécnico	14	5	3	6	29	27	+2	13	Relegated to Serie B
6	Juventud Italiana	14	4	5	5	18	26	−8	13	Relegated to Serie B
7	Norte América	14	5	2	7	14	22	−8	12	Relegated to Serie B
8	Brasil	14	1	4	9	10	28	−18	6	Relegated to Serie B

Source: RSSSF - 1971 Serie A

Home \ Away	9DO	BRA	SDQ	JUV	MAC	NOR	CDO	CDP
9 de Octubre		4–1	3–2	3–0	1–1	1–0	1–0	3–1
Brasil	0–0		1–3	1–1	0–1	3–0	1–1	0–1
Deportivo Quito	4–0	3–0		3–0	2–0	2–0	0–2	1–1
Juventud Italiana	2–2	4–0	0–0		0–0	1–0	1–1	5–1
Macará	1–0	5–2	2–1	4–1		4–0	1–1	3–0
Norte América	1–4	0–0	1–1	1–0	1–0		3–2	3–1
Olmedo	2–0	2–1	4–1	2–3	1–1	1–0		2–1
Politécnico	3–1	3–0	2–2	8–0	2–0	2–4	3–3	

Source: RSSSF - 1971 Serie A
Legend: Blue = home team win; Yellow = draw; Red = away team win.

== Liguilla Final ==
Pos	Team	Pld	W	D	L	GF	GA	GD	Pts	Qualification or relegation
1	Barcelona	14	6	6	2	20	13	+7	18	Champions and Qualified to the 1972 Copa Libertadores
2	América de Quito	14	4	9	1	18	11	+7	17	Qualified to the 1972 Copa Libertadores
3	Emelec	14	4	7	3	12	9	+3	15	
4	El Nacional	14	5	5	4	18	17	+1	15	
5	Universidad Católica	14	4	5	5	17	17	0	13	
6	LDU Quito	14	4	5	5	13	14	−1	13	
7	Deportivo Cuenca	14	2	9	3	8	12	−4	13	Relegated to the Serie B
8	LDU Portoviejo	14	2	4	8	14	27	−13	8	Relegated to the Serie B

Source: RSSSF - 1971 Serie A

Home \ Away	CDA	BSC	CDC	EN	CSE	LDP	LDQ	UC
América de Quito		1–1	1–1	1–1	3–0	3–0	1–1	1–1
Barcelona	1–1		2–0	4–2	0–0	2–1	3–0	2–0
Deportivo Cuenca	1–0	0–0		0–0	0–0	1–0	0–0	2–2
El Nacional	1–2	1–0	4–1		1–1	5–2	1–0	1–1
Emelec	0–0	1–1	0–0	2–0		2–0	0–0	4–0
LDU Portoviejo	2–2	2–2	1–0	0–0	0–2		2–1	2–2
LDU Quito	1–1	1–2	1–1	0–1	1–0	4–2		2–0
Universidad Católica	0–1	3–0	1–1	3–0	3–0	1–0	0–1	

Source: RSSSF - 1971 Serie A
Legend: Blue = home team win; Yellow = draw; Red = away team win.
