= 1984 Liga Deportiva Universitaria de Quito season =

L.D.U. Quito
1984 season
- President: José Cueva Velásquez; Guillermo Valencia; Efrén Cocíos
- Manager: Gustavo de Simone; Leonel Montoya
- Stadium: Estadio Olímpico Atahualpa
- Serie A: 3rd
- Top goalscorer: José Vicente Moreno (21 goals)
Home colours	Away colours

Liga Deportiva Universitaria de Quito's 1984 season was the club's 54th year of existence, the 31st year in professional football and the 24th in the top level of professional football in Ecuador.

== Kits ==
Sponsor(s): Banco Popular

== Competitions ==
=== Serie A ===
==== First stage ====
Group 1

Pos	Team	Pld	W	D	L	GF	GA	GD	Pts	Qualification
1	Barcelona	14	10	3	1	27	8	+19	23	Qualified to the Liguilla Final
2	Técnico Universitario	14	8	2	4	22	15	+7	18	Qualified to the Liguilla Final
3	Emelec	14	5	5	4	19	14	+5	15	
4	Deportivo Quito	14	6	3	5	20	16	+4	15	
5	L.D.U. Quito	14	3	5	6	15	16	−1	11	
6	L.D.U. Portoviejo	14	2	7	5	15	22	−7	11	
7	Aucas	14	1	5	8	14	36	−22	7	Qualified to the Liguilla del No Descenso

Note: Intergroups match (LDU Quito - El Nacional)

===== Results =====
Home \ Away	SDA	BSC	SDQ	EN	CSE	LDP	LDQ	TU
Aucas							2–1	
Barcelona							0–0	
Deportivo Quito							1–0	
El Nacional							1–0	
Emelec							1–1	
L.D.U. Portoviejo							1–1	
L.D.U. Quito	3–1	0–2	4–1	1–1	2–0	0–0		1–2
Técnico Universitario							3–1	

Source: RSSSF
Legend: Blue = home team win; Yellow = draw; Red = away team win.

==== Second stage ====
Group 1
Pos	Team	Pld	W	D	L	GF	GA	GD	Pts	Qualification
1	9 de Octubre	14	7	3	4	29	19	+10	17	Qualified to the Liguilla Final
2	L.D.U. Quito	14	6	3	5	24	16	+8	15	Qualified to the Liguilla Final
3	L.D.U. Portoviejo	14	6	1	7	20	21	−1	13	
4	Emelec	14	4	4	6	18	22	−4	12	
5	América de Quito	14	5	2	7	16	20	−4	12	
6	Deportivo Quevedo	14	5	2	7	15	20	−5	12	
7	Aucas	14	4	3	7	23	33	−10	11	Qualified to the Liguilla del No Descenso

Note: Intergroups match (LDU Quito - El Nacional)

===== Results =====
Home \ Away	CDA	SDA	CDQ	EN	CSE	LDP	LDQ	9DO
América de Quito							1–3	
Aucas							2–3	
Deportivo Quevedo							0–2	
El Nacional							1–0	
Emelec							2–1	
L.D.U. Portoviejo							2–0	
L.D.U. Quito	1–0	4–1	5–0	0–0	2–2	0–1		2–2
9 de Octubre							2–1	

Source: RSSSF
Legend: Blue = home team win; Yellow = draw; Red = away team win.

==== Liguilla Final ====
Pos	Team	Pld	W	D	L	GF	GA	GD	Pts	Qualification
1	El Nacional	14	8	2	4	20	16	+4	20 (Note: Includes bonus points earned in previous stages: El Nacional (2); Barcelona & 9 de Octubre (1))	Champions and Qualified to the 1985 Copa Libertadores
2	9 de Octubre	14	7	3	4	30	28	+2	18	Qualified to the 1985 Copa Libertadores
3	L.D.U. Quito	14	7	3	4	20	18	+2	17	
4	Universidad Católica	14	6	3	5	19	15	+4	15	
5	Barcelona	14	6	1	7	26	18	+8	14	
6	Técnico Universitario	14	5	3	6	20	23	−3	13	
7	Deportivo Quito	14	3	5	6	17	22	−5	11	
8	Emelec	14	2	4	8	18	30	−12	8	

===== Results =====
Home \ Away	BSC	SDQ	EN	CSE	LDQ	TU	UC	9DO
Barcelona					0–0			
Deportivo Quito					1–2			
El Nacional					3–0			
Emelec					1–1			
L.D.U. Quito	1–0	1–0	0–2	3–1		3–2	2–1	4–2
Técnico Universitario					2–1			
Universidad Católica					1–0			
9 de Octubre					2–2			

Source: RSSSF
Legend: Blue = home team win; Yellow = draw; Red = away team win.
