= 1960 Liga Deportiva Universitaria de Quito season =

LDU Quito
1960 season
- President: Manuel Naranjo Toro
- Manager: José Gómes Nogueira
- Stadium: Estadio El Ejido; Estadio Olímpico Atahualpa
- Interandino Serie A: Champions (3rd title); 6th
- Top goalscorer: Óscar Sappia (13 goals - Campeonato Interandiano)
Home colours	Away colours

Liga Deportiva Universitaria de Quito's 1960 season was the club's 30th year of existence, the 7th year in professional football, and the 1st in the top level of professional football in Ecuador.

== Squad ==
No.	Pos.	Nation	Player
—	GK	ECU	Gonzalo Cevallos
—	GK	ECU	Raúl Jiménez
—	DF	ECU	Enrique Portilla
—	DF	ECU	Clemente Rodríguez
—	DF	ECU	Manuel Stacey
—	DF	ECU	Juan Vega
—	DF	ECU	Eduardo Zambrano
—	MF	ARG	Oswaldo Balducci
—	MF	ECU	Héctor Morales
—	MF	ECU	Vicente Villafuerte
—	MF	ECU	Marcelo Zambrano

No.	Pos.	Nation	Player
—	MF	ECU	Mario Zambrano
—	FW	ARG	Epifanio Brizuela
—	FW	BRA	Gilberto dos Santos
—	FW	ECU	Armando Larrea
—	FW	ECU	Hugo Mantilla
—	FW	ECU	José Morillo
—	FW	ARG	Roberto Ortega
—	FW	ECU	Gem Rivadeneira
—	FW	ECU	Miguel Salazar
—	FW	ARG	Óscar Sappia
—	FW	ECU	Bolívar Vivero

== Competitions ==
=== Campeonato Profesional Interadino ===
Position	Team	Points	Qualification or relegation
1	LDU Quito	26	Champions (3rd title) and Qualified to the 1960 Campeonato Ecuatoriano Serie A
2	Deportivo Quito	25	Qualified to the 1960 Campeonato Ecuatoriano Serie A
3	Macará	23	Qualified to the 1960 Campeonato Ecuatoriano Serie A
4	España	22	Qualified to the 1960 Campeonato Ecuatoriano Serie A
5	América de Ambato	22	
6	Aucas	18	
7	América de Quito	17	
8	Atlanta	15	

=== Serie A ===
Pos	Team	Pld	W	D	L	GF	GA	GD	Pts
4	Deportivo Quito	8	4	1	3	13	12	+1	9
5	Everest	8	4	1	3	15	16	−1	9
6	LDU Quito	8	1	3	4	10	15	−5	5
7	Macará	8	2	0	6	16	26	−10	4
8	España	8	1	1	6	12	20	−8	3

==== Results ====
Home \ Away	BSC	SDQ	CSE	SDE	CDE	LDU	MAC	CSP
Barcelona						4–0		
Deportivo Quito								
Emelec						3–1		
España								
Everest						2–1		
LDU Quito	0–0		4–1		2–2			0–1
Macará								
Patria						2–2		

Source: RSSSF
Legend: Blue = home team win; Yellow = draw; Red = away team win.
