= Ramiro Tobar =

Ecuadorian footballer (born 1944)

Personal information
- Date of birth: 1 May 1944 (age 82)
- Position: Defender

International career
Years	Team	Apps	(Gls)
1973–1975	Ecuador	5	(0)

Ramiro Tobar (born 1 May 1944) is an Ecuadorian footballer. He played in five matches for the Ecuador national football team from 1973 to 1975. He was also part of Ecuador's squad for the 1975 Copa América tournament.
