= 1974 Campeonato Ecuatoriano de Fútbol Serie A =

Campeonato Ecuatoriano de Fútbol
- Season: 1974
- Champions: LDU Quito (2nd title)
- Relegated: Deportivo Quito; Macará (both after the first stage)
- Copa Libertadores: LDU Quito; El Nacional
- Top goalscorer: Ángel Liciardi (19 goals)
- Biggest home win: América de Quito 6–0 LDU Portoviejo
- Biggest away win: Deportivo Quito 0–4 El Nacional
- Highest scoring: América de Quito 4–4 Emelec

The 1974 Campeonato Ecuatoriano de Fútbol de la Serie A was the 16th national championship for football teams in Ecuador. LDU Quito won their second national title.

== Teams ==
Eight teams started the season. Two would be relegated mid-season and be replaced by two teams from the Serie B. The following eight teams started the season (home city in parentheses):

- Barcelona (Guayaquil)
- Deportivo Cuenca (Cuenca)
- Deportivo Quito (Quito)
- El Nacional (Quito)
- Emelec (Guayaquil)
- LDU Portoviejo (Portoviejo)
- Macará (Ambato)
- Universidad Católica (Quito)

== First stage ==
Pos	Team	Pld	W	D	L	GF	GA	GD	Pts	Qualification or relegation
1	Deportivo Cuenca	14	8	3	3	22	11	+11	19	Qualified to the Liguilla
2	El Nacional	14	6	6	2	28	19	+9	18	Qualified to the Liguilla
3	Emelec	14	7	3	4	19	15	+4	17	
4	Barcelona	14	4	8	2	19	16	+3	16	
5	LDU Portoviejo	14	4	5	5	21	25	−4	13	
6	Universidad Católica	14	5	1	8	14	18	−4	11	
7	Deportivo Quito	14	2	5	7	16	23	−7	9	Relegated to the Serie B
8	Macará	14	3	3	8	17	29	−12	9	Relegated to the Serie B

Source: RSSSF
Rules for classification: 1) points; 2) goal difference; 3) number of goals scored.

== Second stage ==
Two teams were promoted from the Serie B after the First Stage; there was no relegation after this stage. The new teams are (home city in parentheses):

- América (Quito)
- LDU Quito (Quito)

Pos	Team	Pld	W	D	L	GF	GA	GD	Pts	Qualification or relegation
1	El Nacional	14	4	9	1	20	15	+5	17	Qualified to the Liguilla
2	LDU Quito	14	5	6	3	16	13	+3	16	Qualified to the Liguilla
3	Barcelona	14	5	5	4	21	20	+1	15	
4	América de Quito	14	5	4	5	24	21	+3	14	
5	Deportivo Cuenca	14	5	3	6	19	15	+4	13	
6	Universidad Católica	14	3	7	4	23	24	−1	13	
7	Emelec	14	3	6	5	17	20	−3	12	
8	LDU Portoviejo	14	3	6	5	7	19	−12	12	

Source: RSSSF
Rules for classification: 1) points; 2) goal difference; 3) number of goals scored.

== Liguilla ==
The following teams qualified to for the Liguilla:

- Deportivo Cuenca
- El Nacional
- LDU Quito

Since El Nacional accumulated the most points during the season, they advanced automatically to the finals.

Semifinal					Final
					1	El Nacional	1	0	1
2	Deportivo Cuenca	0	0	0		LDU Quito	2	0	2
3	LDU Quito	1	0	1

Campeonato Ecuatoriano de Fútbol
1974 Champion
LDU Quito
2nd Title
