= Francisco Bertocchi =

Uruguayan footballer (born 1946)

Personal information
- Full name: Francisco Bertocchi Fernández
- Date of birth: 5 August 1946 (age 80)
- Place of birth: Montevideo, Uruguay
- Position: Midfielder

Senior career*
Years	Team	Apps	(Gls)
1967–1968	Peñarol		
1968–1970	L.D.U. Quito	33	(32)
1970	Peñarol		
1970–1971	Liverpool MVD		
1974–1977	Monterrey		
1977–1981	Tampico	89	(26)

International career
1971–1973	Uruguay	10	(1)

Managerial career
- 1989–1990: L.D.U. Quito
- 1996: L.D.U. Quito
- * Club domestic league appearances and goals

Francisco "El Tano" Bertocchi Fernández (born 5 August 1946) is a Uruguayan retired footballer who played as a midfielder for several clubs in Latin America, including Peñarol, Liga Deportiva Universitaria de Quito, Liverpool de Montevideo and Club de Futbol Monterrey.

== Career ==
Bertocchi received 10 caps for the Uruguay national football team, scoring once.

His beginnings were at Peñarol, and later he moved to Ecuador to play for Liga de Quito.

Bertocci was the top scorer in the Ecuadorian League in 1969 with L.D.U. Quito, the following year he was joint top scorer in the Copa Libertadores with Argentine Oscar Más.

After his time in Ecuadorian football, he returned to his country and played in a second spell with Peñarol. Then, in the 1973-74 season, he joined Monterrey from the Uruguayan Liverpool, transferred by Peñarol for $32,000. Francisco excelled in an offensive team in Mexico, but they couldn't win a league title. He made his debut in July 1973, and in his first season, he scored 18 goals. However, an injury in the 1975-76 season kept him out for a significant part of the tournament. In just over three years with Rayados, Bertocchi scored 37 goals in official matches and bid farewell to the Monterrey fans with an emotional lap of honor in December 1976.

Bertocchi ended his career in Mexico, playing for Tampico Madero during the 1977-78 to 1980-81 seasons and scoring 26 goals.
