= Club Atlético Green Cross =

Ecuadorean football club

Green Cross
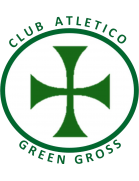
- Full name: Club Atlético Green Cross
- Nickname: El Equipo de la Cruz Verde (The Team of the Green Cross)
- Founded: January 12, 1961; 64 years ago
- Ground: Estadio Jocay; Manta, Ecuador
- Capacity: 20,000
Home colours	Away colours

Club Atlético Green Cross is a football club based in Manta, Ecuador, founded on January 12, 1961. In 1991 the team won the title in the Serie B E1.

== Achievements ==
=== National ===
- Campeonato Ecuatoriano de Fútbol Serie B
  - Champions (1): 1991 E1
