= Valdez Sporting Club =

Football club

Valdez
- Full name: Valdez Sporting Club
- Nicknames: El Equipo Azucarero (The Sugar Team)
- Founded: January 21, 1991; 34 years ago
- Dissolved: December 31, 1997
- Ground: Estadio Los Chirijos; Milagro, Ecuador
- Capacity: 12,000
Home colours	Away colours

Valdez Sporting Club was an Ecuadorian football club based in Milagro, Guayas. The club was founded in 1991 after Filanbanco ceded its franchise to the club. That same year, it finished as the Serie A runner-up. The following year, they participated in their first and only Copa Libertadores. They successfully advanced out of the group stage and were eventually eliminated in the Round of 16 by San Lorenzo de Almagro by penalties. After six years, the club folded in 1997.

== Achievements ==
- Serie A
  - Runner-up (1): 1991

Performance in CONMEBOL competitions

- Copa Libertadores: 1 participation
  - Best: 1992 (Round of 16)
