= Oscar Zubía =

Uruguayan footballer (born 1946)

Óscar Zubía
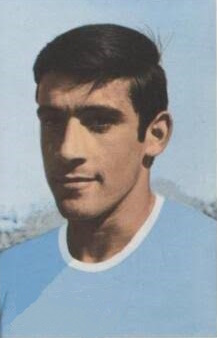
- Zubía at the 1970 FIFA World Cup

Personal information
- Full name: Joffre Óscar Zubía Miguez
- Date of birth: 8 February 1946 (age 80)
- Place of birth: Montevideo, Montevideo Department, Uruguay
- Height: 1.65 m (5 ft 5 in)
- Position: Forward

Senior career*
Years	Team	Apps	(Gls)
1967–1970	River Plate Montevideo	?	(3)
1970–1972	Peñarol	?	(27)
1972–1976	LDU Quito	90	(29)

International career^{‡}
1968–1971	Uruguay	15	(4)

Managerial career
- 1978: LDU Quito
- 1993–1994: LDU Quito
- * Club domestic league appearances and goals as of April 26, 2009 ‡ National team caps and goals as of April 26, 2009

Joffre Óscar Zubía Miguez (born 8 February 1946, in Montevideo) is a retired Uruguayan football player. He has played for clubs in Ecuador and Uruguay, as well as the Uruguay football team in the 1970 World Cup.

== Club career ==
Zubia started his career at River Plate de Montevideo, where he impressed the national team, earning a spot on the 1970 Uruguay World Cup team.

He then transferred to cross-town team Peñarol, where he was able to play in his first Copa Libertadores in 1971.

In 1972, Zubia made the move to Ecuador to play for LDU Quito, where he helped the team earn its first two national championships also becoming the national top scorer with 30 goals. He retired from football after his participation at the Quito club.

== International career ==
Zubia had 15 caps for the Uruguay football team from 1968-1971. He was part of the squad that played in the 1970 World Cup, earning 2 caps against Italy & Sweden.

== Later career ==
Since retiring from footballer, Zubia has stayed on with LDU Quito as a manager at the youth and senior level. He was the senior team coach from 1997-1998. Currently works as a Scout and Coaching the minor leagues in LDU Quito

== Honors ==
LDU Quito

- Serie A: 1974, 1975
