= Diego Herrera =

Ecuadorian footballer (born 1969)

Personal information
- Full name: Diego Rodrigo Herrera Larrea
- Date of birth: April 20, 1969 (age 57)
- Place of birth: Pichincha, Ecuador
- Height: 1.75 m (5 ft 9 in)
- Position: Forward

Senior career*
Years	Team	Apps	(Gls)
1986–1996	LDU Quito	199	(55)
1994	→ Barcelona SC (loan)	8	(1)
1997–2002	El Nacional	173	(56)

International career^{‡}
1992–1999	Ecuador	11	(0)
- * Club domestic league appearances and goals as of 11 August 2007 ‡ National team caps and goals as of 4 July 2007

Diego Rodrigo Herrera Larrea (born April 20, 1969 in Pichincha, Ecuador) is a retired footballer from Ecuador. He played as a forward during his career.

Herrera obtained a total number of 11 caps for the Ecuador national football team during the 1990s, scoring no goals.

== Honors ==
=== Club ===
- LDU Quito
  - Serie A de Ecuador: 1990

=== International ===
- Ecuador
  - Korea Cup: 1995
