= Luis González (footballer, born 1972) =

Ecuadorian footballer

Personal information
- Full name: Luis Ernesto González Mina
- Date of birth: November 25, 1972 (age 53)
- Place of birth: Esmeraldas, Ecuador
- Position: Midfielder

Senior career*
Years	Team	Apps	(Gls)
1992–2005	L.D.U. Quito	308	(17)
1993	→ Universidad Católica (loan)	?	(?)
2006	Aucas	23	(0)
2007	Manta	35	(0)
2008	Imbabura	34	(2)
2009	Talleres	2	(0)

International career
1996–1999	Ecuador	13	(0)
- * Club domestic league appearances and goals as of February 28, 2018

Luis Ernesto González Mina (born 25 November 1972), is a retired Ecuadorian footballer, he played as a midfielder during his career.

== Career ==
González spent the majority of his professional career with L.D.U. Quito, he also played for Universidad Católica, Aucas, Manta, Imbabura and Talleres. He retired from football after the 2009 season.

== International career ==
Between 1996 and 1999, he earned 13 caps with the Ecuador national team.

== Honors ==
L.D.U. Quito

- Serie A: 1998, 1999, 2003, 2005 Apertura
- Serie B: 2001
