= Esmeraldas Petrolero =

Ecuadorian sports club

- Full name: Club Social, Cultural y Deportivo Esmeraldas Petrolero
- Nicknames: El ídolo de Esmeraldas (The Idol of Esmeraldas); El Equipo Petrolero (The Petrol Team)
- Founded: December 27, 1977; 48 years ago
- Ground: Estadio Folke Anderson, Esmeraldas
- Capacity: 14,000
Home colours	Away colours

Club Social, Cultural y Deportivo Esmeraldas Petrolero is a sports club based in Esmeraldas, Ecuador. It is best known for its professional football team, which has since folded after the 2017/2018 season.

The club was founded on December 29, 1977, by the workers of the nearby oil refineries in the province. By the 1980s, the team ascended to the top-level of football in the country, the Serie A, where it enjoy moderate success. The team finished 4th in 1984 and had the league's top-scorer in 1985, Brazilian Guga.

The 1990s proved to be a downtime for the club. They had been relegated down to the third tier of football, Segunda Categoria. By 1998, they had gained promotion to the Serie B, where it stayed until 2003. They quickly gained promotion the following season, only to be relegated back to the Segunda by the first stage of 2006.
