= Juan Guamán =

Ecuadorian footballer (born 1965)

Personal information
- Full name: Juan Helio Guamán
- Date of birth: June 27, 1965 (age 61)
- Place of birth: Quito, Ecuador
- Position: Defender

Senior career*
Years	Team	Apps	(Gls)
1986–2000	LDU Quito	387	(14)
2001–2003	Deportivo Quito	78	(0)
2004	ESPOLI	14	(0)
2004	Universidad Católica	18	(0)
2006–2007	UTE	19	(1)
2009	Deportivo Saquisilí	5	(1)

International career
1991–1995	Ecuador	10	(1)
- * Club domestic league appearances and goals as of May 10, 2009

Juan Helio Guamán (born 27 June 1965) is a retired Ecuadorian football defender.

== International career ==
He obtained a total number of ten caps for the Ecuador national team during the early 1990s. He competed for his native country in two Copa America's: 1991 and 1995.
