= Danilo Samaniego =

Ecuadorian footballer (born 1964)

Personal information
- Full name: Lenin Danilo Samaniego Samaniego
- Date of birth: December 22, 1964 (age 61)
- Place of birth: Quito, Ecuador
- Position: Defender

Senior career*
Years	Team	Apps	(Gls)
1982–1998	L.D.U. Quito	399	(21)
1996	→ Deportivo Quito (loan)	37	(1)
Total		436	(22)

International career
1987	Ecuador	1	(0)
- * Club domestic league appearances and goals as of February 28, 2018

Danilo Samaniego (born 22 December 1964) is retired football player from Ecuador, he played as a defender during his career.

== Career ==
Samaniego began his career with L.D.U. Quito in 1982, he also played for Deportivo Quito.

== Honours ==
- L.D.U. Quito
  - Ecuadorian Serie A: 1990, 1998
