= Santiago Jácome =

Ecuadorian footballer (born 1973)

Personal information
- Full name: Rolando Santiago Jácome Ponce
- Date of birth: April 4, 1973 (age 53)
- Place of birth: Quito, Ecuador
- Position: Defender

Senior career*
Years	Team	Apps	(Gls)
1992–2007	LDU Quito	311	(1)
1993	→ Universidad Católica (loan)		

International career
1999–2000	Ecuador	3	(0)
- * Club domestic league appearances and goals

Rolando Santiago Jácome Ponce, known simply as Santiago Jácome (born April 4, 1973), is a retired Ecuadorian footballer who currently is the sporting director of LDU Quito.

== Club career ==
Jácome spent the majority of his professional career with the Quito-based club, except for one season with Universidad Católica. He retired from football after the 2007 season.

== International career ==
Between 1999 and 2000, he earned three caps with the Ecuador national team.

== Honors ==
LDU Quito

- Serie A: 1998, 1999, 2003, 2005 Apertura, 2007
- Serie B: 2001
