= Manta Sport Club =

Manta
- Full name: Manta Sport Club
- Nicknames: El Equipo de la ciudad (The Team of the City)
- Founded: January 1, 1967; 59 years ago
- Dissolved: August 20, 1996
- Ground: Estadio Jocay; Manta, Ecuador
- Capacity: 20,000
Home colours	Away colours

Manta Sport Club was an Ecuadorian professional football club based in Manta. Founded in 1967, it spent the majority of its years bouncing between the top-flight Serie A and the Serie B until 1985. Statistically, it is the most successful club from Manta. The club later folded in 1996 after 10 years in the Segunda Categoría. The club dissolved a little after 81 years of existence when it ceded its team to Manta FC.

== Achievements ==
- Serie B
  - Winner (2): 1979 E1, 1982 E2
