= Cipriano Yu Lee =

Ecuadorian goalkeeper

Personal information
- Full name: Vicente Cipriano Yu Lee Taysing
- Date of birth: 16 September 1933
- Place of birth: Guayaquil, Ecuador
- Date of death: 8 July 2008 (aged 74)
- Place of death: Guayaquil, Ecuador
- Position: Goalkeeper

Youth career
- Emelec

Senior career*
Years	Team	Apps	(Gls)
1951–1963	Emelec		
1951–1953	→ LDU Guayaquil (loan)		
1957	→ Barcelona SC (loan)		
- Patria

International career
1957–1960	Ecuador	6	(0)
- * Club domestic league appearances and goals

Vicente Cipriano Yu Lee Taysing (16 September 1933 – 8 July 2008) was an Ecuadorian footballer who played as a goalkeeper.

== Club career ==
Yu Lee began his career at Ecuadorian club Emelec. In 1951, Yu Lee was loaned out to LDU Guayaquil, remaining with the club until 1953. On 1 July 1953, Yu Lee made his debut for Emelec against Chacarita Juniors, becoming Emelec's first choice goalkeeper in 1955. On 16 January 1957, following an injury to Pablo Ansaldo, Yu Lee made an appearance for rivals Barcelona SC against Argentine side Independiente.

Upon returning to Emelec, Yu Lee was part of the side that won the 1957 Campeonato Ecuatoriano de Fútbol, marking the first time a competition had been held to determine the national champions of Ecuador. Whilst at Emelec, Yu Lee became the first ever goalkeeper to save a penalty in the Copa Libertadores, saving Genaro Benitez's effort in a 4–2 win against Colombian side Millonarios on 7 February 1962.

Following his time at Emelec, Yu Lee signed for fellow Guayaquil-based club Patria.

== International career ==
In 1957, Yu Lee was called up to the Ecuador national team for the first time, starting Ecuador's opening game in the 1957 South American Championship. Two years later, Yu Lee was again called up by Ecuador to compete in the 1959 edition of the tournament hosted in Ecuador.

== Personal life ==
Born in Ecuador, Yu Lee was of Chinese descent.

Following his playing career, Yu Lee ventured into journalism, helping found evening newspaper La Razón.

On 8 July 2008, after suffering from a heart attack, Yu Lee died at the age of 74.

== Honours ==
Emelec

- Campeonato Ecuatoriano de Fútbol: 1957, 1961
