= 1990 Liga Deportiva Universitaria de Quito season =

L.D.U. Quito
1990 season
- President: Raúl Vaca
- Manager: Francisco Bertocchi (until August); Polo Carrera (from September)
- Stadium: Estadio Olímpico Atahualpa
- Serie A: Champions (4th title)
- Top goalscorer: Carlos Berrueta (20 goals)
Home colours	Away colours

Liga Deportiva Universitaria de Quito's 1990 season was the club's 60th year of existence, the 37th year in professional football and the 30th in the top level of professional football in Ecuador.

== Kits ==
Sponsor(s): Philips

== Squad ==
No.	Pos.	Nation	Player
—	GK	ECU	Patricio Gallardo
—	GK	ECU	Liborio Hurtado
—	GK	ECU	Víctor Sánchez
—	DF	ECU	Rodney Mantilla
—	DF	ECU	César Mina
—	DF	ECU	Raúl Murillo
—	DF	ECU	Janz Ortega
—	DF	ECU	Danilo Ríos
—	DF	ECU	Danilo Samaniego
—	DF	URU	Enrique Saravia
—	DF	ECU	Eduardo Zambrano
—	MF	URU	Carlos Berrueta

No.	Pos.	Nation	Player
—	MF	ECU	Hernán Castillo
—	MF	ECU	Juan Guamán
—	MF	ECU	Pietro Marsetti (captain)
—	MF	ECU	Carlos Páez
—	MF	ECU	Luis Pozo
—	FW	ECU	Mauricio Argüello
—	FW	ECU	Nelson Guerrero
—	FW	ECU	Diego Herrera
—	FW	ECU	Pedro Salvador
—	FW	URU	Ernesto Vargas
—	FW	ARG	Hugo Vílchez

== Competitions ==
=== Serie A ===
==== First stage ====
Pos	Team	Pld	W	D	L	GF	GA	GD	Pts	Qualification or relegation
3	Deportivo Quito	22	9	8	5	35	19	+16	26	Qualified to the Third Stage
4	Emelec	22	10	5	7	27	18	+9	25	Qualified to the Third Stage
5	LDU Quito	22	9	7	6	27	23	+4	25	
6	Delfín	22	8	7	7	25	24	+1	23	
7	Deportivo Cuenca	22	7	8	7	31	28	+3	22	

Source: RSSSF
Rules for classification: 1) points; 2) goal difference; 3) number of goals scored.

===== Results =====
Home \ Away	SDA	BSC	DSC	CDC	SDQ	EN	CSE	CDF	JUV	LDQ	MAC	TU
Aucas										1–3		
Barcelona										2–0		
Delfín										2–2		
Deportivo Cuenca										1–1		
Deportivo Quito										1–1		
El Nacional										0–0		
Emelec										1–0		
Filanbanco										1–0		
Juventus										0–1		
L.D.U. Quito	2–1	2–0	0–0	1–1	1–1	2–1	0–4	1–0	2–0		3–0	3–2
Macará										2–1		
Técnico Universitario										2–1		

Source: RSSSF
Legend: Blue = home team win; Yellow = draw; Red = away team win.

==== Second stage ====
Group 1
Pos	Team	Pld	W	D	L	GF	GA	GD	Pts	Qualification or relegation
2	El Nacional	10	6	3	1	14	6	+8	15	Qualified to the Third Stage
3	Filanbanco	10	3	3	4	15	13	+2	9	
4	Deportivo Cuenca	10	3	3	4	7	12	−5	9	
5	LDU Quito	10	1	3	6	10	16	−6	5	
6	Macará	10	1	3	6	7	20	−13	5	

Source: RSSSF
Rules for classification: 1) points; 2) goal difference; 3) number of goals scored.

===== Results =====
Home \ Away	CDC	SDQ	EN	CDF	LDQ	MAC
Deportivo Cuenca					1–0	
Deportivo Quito					3–0	
El Nacional					2–1	
Filanbanco					2–0	
L.D.U. Quito	4–1	0–0	1–2	2–2		2–2
Macará					1–0	

Source: RSSSF
Legend: Blue = home team win; Yellow = draw; Red = away team win.

==== Third stage ====
Pos	Team	Pld	W	D	L	GF	GA	GD	Pts	Qualification or relegation	NAC	LDQ	QUI	CUE
1	El Nacional	6	2	4	0	9	6	+3	9.5 (Note: Includes bonus points earned in the previous stage: El Nacional and Deportivo Cuenca 1.5 points each.)	Qualified to the Liguilla Final		3–3	1–1	3–1
2	LDU Quito	6	2	3	1	13	8	+5	7	Qualified to the Liguilla Final	0–1		2–2	1–1
3	Deportivo Quito	6	1	3	2	8	12	−4	6.5		1–1	1–5		2–1
4	Deportivo Cuenca	6	1	2	3	5	9	−4	4		0–0	0–2	2–1	

Source: RSSSF
Legend: Blue = home team win; Yellow = draw; Red = away team win.
Rules for classification: 1) points; 2) goal difference; 3) number of goals scored.

==== Liguilla Final ====
Pos	Team	Pld	W	D	L	GF	GA	GD	Pts	Qualification or relegation	LDQ	BAR	EME	NAC
1	LDU Quito (C)	6	3	1	2	7	9	−2	7	1991 Copa Libertadores		3–1	1–0	1–0
2	Barcelona	6	1	4	1	10	8	+2	6	Second-Place Playoffs	4–0		1–1	2–2
3	Emelec	6	2	2	2	6	9	−3	6	Second-Place Playoffs	2–0	1–1		1–0
4	El Nacional	6	1	3	2	11	8	+3	5		2–2	1–1	6–1	

Source: RSSSF
Legend: Blue = home team win; Yellow = draw; Red = away team win.
Rules for classification: 1st points
(C) Champions
