= Oswaldo Ibarra =

Ecuadorian footballer (born 1969)

Personal information
- Full name: Oswaldo Johvani Ibarra Carabalí
- Date of birth: September 8, 1969 (age 57)
- Place of birth: Ambuquí, Ecuador
- Height: 1.80 m (5 ft 11 in)
- Position: Goalkeeper

Senior career*
Years	Team	Apps	(Gls)
1989	17 de Julio		
1989–2007	El Nacional	464	(0)
1989–1990	→ Olmedo (loan)		
2008–2010	Deportivo Quito	100	(0)
2011–2012	Imbabura	28	(0)
2012–2013	Independiente del Valle	9	(0)
2013–2014	Clan Juvenil		

International career
1997–2004	Ecuador	67	(0)
- * Club domestic league appearances and goals

Oswaldo Johvani Ibarra Carabalí (born 8 September 1969) is an Ecuadorian former footballer who played as a goalkeeper.

== Club career ==
Ibarra has spent the majority of his club career playing for El Nacional in Quito.

== International career ==
He also played for the Ecuador national football team and was a participant at the 2002 FIFA World Cup.

== Honours ==
=== Clubs ===
- El Nacional
  - Ecuadorian Serie A: 1992, 1996, 2005 (Clausura), 2006
- Deportivo Quito
  - Ecuadorian Serie A: 2008, 2009

=== Nation ===
- Ecuador
  - Canada Cup: 1999
