= 1990 Campeonato Ecuatoriano de Fútbol Serie A =

Serie A
- Season: 1990
- Champions: LDU Quito (4th title)
- Relegated: Juventus; Aucas
- Copa Libertadores: LDU Quito; Barcelona
- Top goalscorer: Ermen Benítez (28 goals)

The 1990 Campeonato Ecuatoriano de Fútbol de la Serie A was the 32nd season of the Serie A, the top level of professional football in Ecuador.

LDU Quito won their fourth national championship under the guidance of manager Polo Carrera. Their title was won on December 23 when they defeated Barcelona 3–1 at Estadio Olímpico Atahualpa.

== First stage ==
Pos	Team	Pld	W	D	L	GF	GA	GD	Pts	Qualification or relegation
1	El Nacional	22	13	8	1	47	18	+29	34	Qualified to the Third Stage
2	Barcelona	22	11	4	7	45	25	+20	26	Qualified to the Third Stage
3	Deportivo Quito	22	9	8	5	35	19	+16	26	Qualified to the Third Stage
4	Emelec	22	10	5	7	27	18	+9	25	Qualified to the Third Stage
5	LDU Quito	22	9	7	6	27	23	+4	25	
6	Delfín	22	8	7	7	25	24	+1	23	
7	Deportivo Cuenca	22	7	8	7	31	28	+3	22	
8	Técnico Universitario	22	10	2	10	28	30	−2	22	
9	Filanbanco	22	6	8	8	21	25	−4	20	
10	Aucas	22	6	6	10	28	38	−10	18	
11	Macará	22	6	4	12	19	43	−24	16	Relegation Ligulla
12	Juventus	22	2	3	17	16	58	−42	7	Relegated to the Serie B

Source: RSSSF
Rules for classification: 1) points; 2) goal difference; 3) number of goals scored.

== Second stage ==
Universidad Católica, winners of the 1990 Serie B E1, were promoted to the Serie A for this stage.

Group 1
Pos	Team	Pld	W	D	L	GF	GA	GD	Pts	Qualification or relegation
1	Deportivo Quito	10	7	3	0	19	5	+14	17	Qualified to the Third Stage
2	El Nacional	10	6	3	1	14	6	+8	15	Qualified to the Third Stage
3	Filanbanco	10	3	3	4	15	13	+2	9	
4	Deportivo Cuenca	10	3	3	4	7	12	−5	9	
5	LDU Quito	10	1	3	6	10	16	−6	5	
6	Macará	10	1	3	6	7	20	−13	5	

Source: RSSSF
Rules for classification: 1) points; 2) goal difference; 3) number of goals scored.

Group 2
Pos	Team	Pld	W	D	L	GF	GA	GD	Pts	Qualification or relegation
1	Universidad Católica	10	4	6	0	13	5	+8	14	Qualified to the Third Stage
2	Emelec	10	5	2	3	18	8	+10	12	Qualified to the Third Stage
3	Aucas	10	3	3	4	15	29	−14	9	
4	Técnico Universitario	10	4	2	4	11	13	−2	8 (Note: Técnico Universitario was docked two points.)	
5	Delfín	10	2	4	4	8	11	−3	8	
6	Barcelona	10	2	3	5	12	21	−9	7	

Source: RSSSF
Rules for classification: 1) points; 2) goal difference; 3) number of goals scored.

== Aggregate table ==
Since five of the eight spots for the Third Stage were filled in based on their performance in the previous stages, an aggregate table of the First and Second Stages was used to determine who would fill in the remaining three space, as well as who would complete the Relegation Liguilla.

Pos	Team	Pld	W	D	L	GF	GA	GD	Pts	Qualification or relegation
1	El Nacional	32	19	11	2	61	24	+37	49	
2	Deportivo Quito	32	16	11	5	54	24	+30	43	
3	Emelec	32	15	7	10	45	26	+19	37	
4	Barcelona	32	13	7	12	57	46	+11	33	
5	Delfín	32	10	11	11	33	35	−2	31	Qualified to the Third Stage
6	Deportivo Cuenca	32	10	11	11	38	40	−2	31	Qualified to the Third Stage
7	LDU Quito	32	10	10	12	37	39	−2	30	Qualified to the Third Stage
8	Técnico Universitario	32	14	4	14	39	43	−4	30 (Note: Técnico Universitario was docked two points in the Second Stage.)	Relegation Liguilla
9	Filanbanco	32	9	11	12	36	38	−2	29	Relegation Liguilla
10	Aucas	32	9	9	14	43	67	−24	27	Relegation Liguilla
11	Macará	32	7	7	18	26	63	−37	21	
12	Universidad Católica	10	4	6	0	13	5	+8	14	
13	Juventus	22	2	3	17	16	58	−42	7	

Source: RSSSF
Rules for classification: 1) points; 2) goal difference; 3) number of goals scored.

== Third stage ==
=== Group 1 ===
Pos	Team	Pld	W	D	L	GF	GA	GD	Pts	Qualification or relegation	NAC	LDQ	QUI	CUE
1	El Nacional	6	2	4	0	9	6	+3	9.5 (Note: Includes bonus points earned in the previous stage: El Nacional and Deportivo Cuenca 1.5 points each.)	Qualified to the Liguilla Final		3–3	1–1	3–1
2	LDU Quito	6	2	3	1	13	8	+5	7	Qualified to the Liguilla Final	0–1		2–2	1–1
3	Deportivo Quito	6	1	3	2	8	12	−4	6.5		1–1	1–5		2–1
4	Deportivo Cuenca	6	1	2	3	5	9	−4	4		0–0	0–2	2–1	

Source: RSSSF
Rules for classification: 1) points; 2) goal difference; 3) number of goals scored.

=== Group 2 ===
Pos	Team	Pld	W	D	L	GF	GA	GD	Pts	Qualification or relegation	EME	BAR	DEL	CAT
1	Emelec	6	3	2	1	8	5	+3	9 (Note: Includes bonus points earned in the previous stage: Emelec and Universidad Católica 1 point each.)	Qualified to the Liguilla Final		3–4	1–0	0–0
2	Barcelona	6	3	2	1	9	5	+4	8	Qualified to the Liguilla Final	0–1		1–0	3–0
3	Delfín	6	2	1	3	4	5	−1	5		1–3	0–0		2–0
4	Universidad Católica	6	0	3	3	1	7	−6	4		0–0	1–1	0–1	

Source: RSSSF
Rules for classification: 1) points; 2) goal difference; 3) number of goals scored.

== Relegation Liguilla ==
Pos	Team	Pld	W	D	L	GF	GA	GD	Pts	Qualification or relegation	FIL	TEC	MAC	AUC
1	Filanbanco	6	4	1	1	12	5	+7	9			2–0	2–1	5–0
2	Técnico Universitario	6	3	1	2	5	4	+1	7		2–0		0–1	1–0
3	Macará	6	3	1	2	6	3	+3	6 (Note: Includes relegation points earned in the previous stage: Macará –1; Aucas –0.5.)		0–1	0–0		2–0
4	Aucas	6	0	1	5	3	14	−11	0.5	Relegation to the Serie B	2–2	1–2	0–2	

Source: RSSSF
Rules for classification: 1) points; 2) goal difference; 3) number of goals scored.

== Liguilla Final ==
Pos	Team	Pld	W	D	L	GF	GA	GD	Pts	Qualification or relegation	LDQ	BAR	EME	NAC
1	LDU Quito (C)	6	3	1	2	7	9	−2	7	1991 Copa Libertadores		3–1	1–0	1–0
2	Barcelona	6	1	4	1	10	8	+2	6	Second-Place Playoffs	4–0		1–1	2–2
3	Emelec	6	2	2	2	6	9	−3	6	Second-Place Playoffs	2–0	1–1		1–0
4	El Nacional	6	1	3	2	11	8	+3	5		2–2	1–1	6–1	

Source: RSSSF
Rules for classification: 1st points
(C) Champions

Serie A
1990 champion

4th title

=== Second-place playoffs ===
Team 1	Score	Team 2
Emelec	1–1	Barcelona
Barcelona	3–1	Emelec
