= 1985 Campeonato Ecuatoriano de Fútbol Serie A =

Campeonato Ecuatoriano de Fútbol
- Season: 1985
- Champions: Barcelona
- Relegated: Manta
- Copa Libertadores: Barcelona; Deportivo Quito
- Matches: 296
- Goals: 827 (2.79 per match)

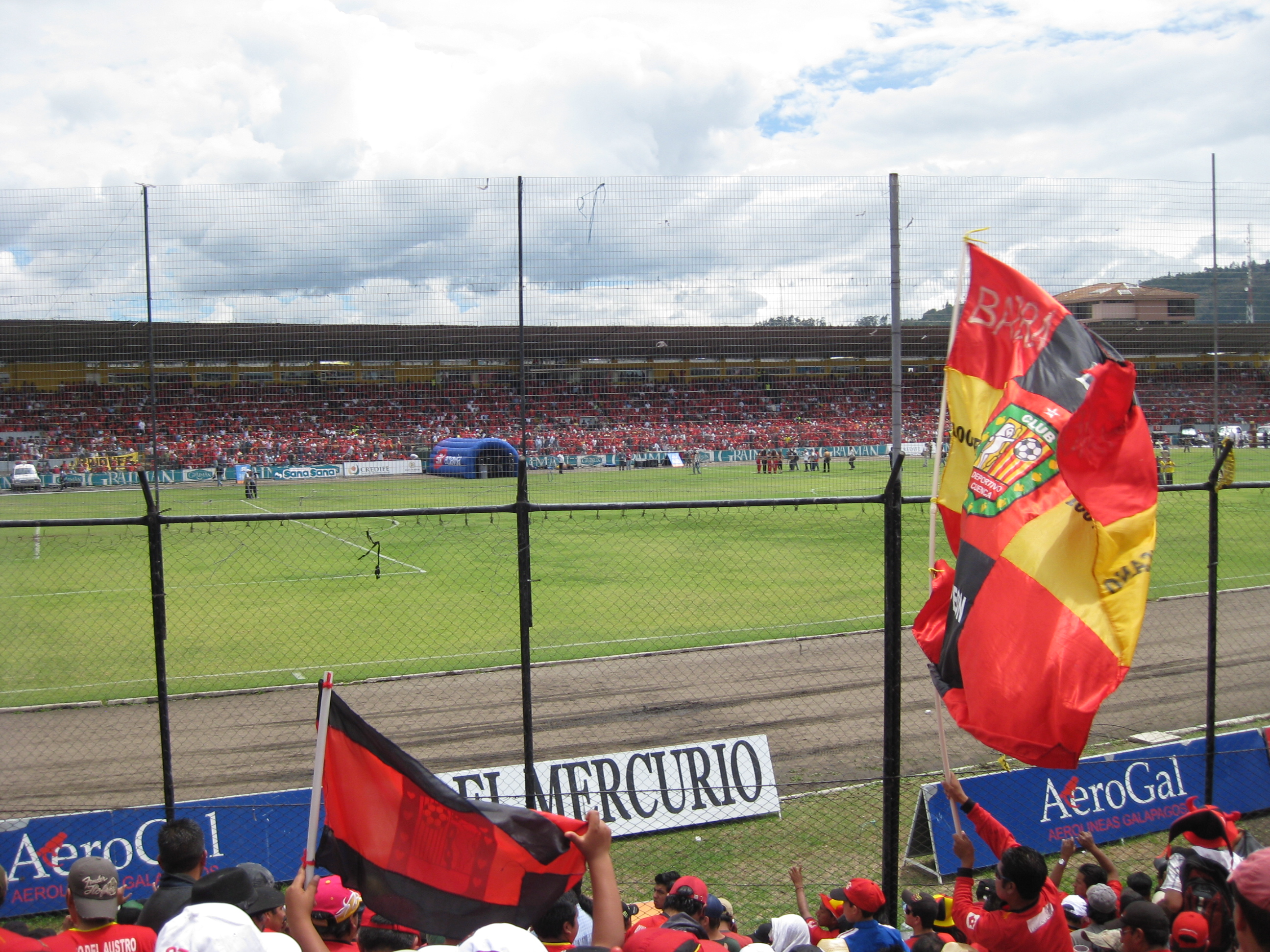
Alejandro Serrano Aguilar Stadium, home of Deportivo Cuenca Club, Ecuador.

The 1985 Campeonato Ecuatoriano de Fútbol de la Serie A was the 27th national championship for football teams in Ecuador.

== Teams ==
The number of teams for this season was played by 14 teams.

Club	City
9 de Octubre	Guayaquil
América de Quito	Quito
Barcelona	Guayaquil
Deportivo Cuenca	Cuenca
Deportivo Quevedo	Quevedo
Deportivo Quito	Quito
El Nacional	Quito
Emelec	Guayaquil
Filanbanco	Guayaquil
LDU Portoviejo	Portoviejo
LDU Quito	Quito
Manta	Manta
Técnico Universitario	Ambato
Universidad Católica	Quito

== Standings ==
Pos	Team	Pld	W	D	L	GF	GA	GD	Pts	Qualification or relegation
1	Filanbanco	30	18	8	4	65	31	+34	44	Qualified to the Octogonal Final
2	Barcelona	30	16	9	5	39	20	+19	41	Qualified to the Octogonal Final
3	Deportivo Quito	30	14	9	7	53	36	+17	37	Qualified to the Octogonal Final
4	El Nacional	30	14	7	9	70	47	+23	35	Qualified to the Octogonal Final
5	Universidad Católica	30	12	10	8	46	36	+10	34	Qualified to the Octogonal Final
6	9 de Octubre	30	12	10	8	38	29	+9	34	Qualified to the Octogonal Final
7	LDU Portoviejo	30	14	6	10	42	45	−3	34	Qualified to the Octogonal Final
8	Esmeraldas Petrolero	30	14	5	11	36	30	+6	33	Qualified to the Octogonal Final
9	LDU Quito	30	14	5	11	52	46	+6	33	
10	Emelec	30	11	5	14	43	46	−3	27	
11	Deportivo Quevedo	30	8	11	11	24	34	−10	27	
12	Deportivo Cuenca	30	10	3	17	40	50	−10	23	
13	Técnico Universitario	30	8	5	17	28	43	−15	21	
14	Audaz Octubrino	30	9	3	18	32	65	−33	21	
15	América de Quito	30	4	11	15	18	40	−22	19	
16	Manta	30	5	7	18	26	54	−28	17	Relegated to the Serie B

Source: RSSSF - 1985 Serie A

== Octogonal Final ==
Pos	Team	Pld	W	D	L	GF	GA	GD	Pts	Qualification
1	Barcelona (Note: Barcelona were awarded two point.) (C)	14	11	2	1	29	5	+24	26	1986 Copa Libertadores
2	Deportivo Quito (Note: Deportivo Quito were awarded one point.)	14	10	0	4	28	22	+6	21	1986 Copa Libertadores
3	Filanbanco (Note: Filanbanco were awarded three points.)	14	8	1	5	32	15	+17	20	
4	Esmeraldas Petrolero	14	7	2	5	22	20	+2	16	
5	El Nacional	14	4	4	6	21	21	0	12	
6	Universidad Católica	14	5	2	7	23	24	−1	12	
7	9 de Octubre	14	3	2	9	13	26	−13	8	
8	LDU Portoviejo	14	0	3	11	7	42	−35	3	

Source: RSSSF - 1985 Serie A
(C) Champions
Notes:

Campeonato Ecuatoriano de Fútbol
1985 champion
