= 1963 Campeonato Ecuatoriano de Fútbol =

Campeonato Ecuatoriano de Fútbol
- Season: 1963
- Champions: Barcelona (2nd title)
- Copa Campeones: Barcelona
- Matches played: 37
- Goals scored: 104 (2.81 per match)
- Top goalscorer: Edison Paucar; Carlos Alberto Raffo (5 goals each)
- Biggest home win: LDU Quito 4–0 Patria; Estibadores Navales 4–0 LDU Quito; Emelec 4–0 Aucas
- Biggest away win: Deportivo Quito 0–5 Barcelona
- Highest scoring: River Plate de Riobamba 1–5 Deportivo Quito

The 1963 Campeonato Ecuatoriano de Fútbol (English: Ecuadorian Football Championship) was the 5th national championship for football teams in Ecuador. Barcelona won their second national title.

== Qualified teams ==
Eleven teams qualified to compete in this season's tournament: four from the professional leagues of Quito and Guayaquil, two from Tungurahua, and one from Manabí.

Competition	Team	Qualification method
Guayaquil; 2 berths	Barcelona	1963 Guayaquil champion
Guayaquil; 2 berths	9 de Octubre	1963 Guayaquil runner-up
Guayaquil; 2 berths	Emelec	1963 Guayaquil top-four finisher
Guayaquil; 2 berths	Patria	1963 Guayaquil top-four finisher
Interandino; 2 berths	Deportivo Quito	1963 Interandino champion
Interandino; 2 berths	LDU Quito	1963 Interandino runner-up
Interandino; 2 berths	Aucas	1963 Interandino top-four finisher
Interandino; 2 berths	Politécnico	1963 Interandino top-four finisher
Tungurahua; 2 berths	Macará	
Tungurahua; 2 berths	River Plate	
Manabí; 1 berth	Estibadores Navales	

== First stage ==
=== Group A ===
==== Standings ====
Pos	Team	Pld	W	D	L	GF	GA	GD	Pts	Qualification
1	Politécnico	4	2	1	1	7	5	+2	5	Advanced to the Final Stage
2	Barcelona	4	2	1	1	4	3	+1	5	Advanced to the Final Stage
3	Patria	4	2	1	1	5	6	−1	5	
4	LDU Quito	4	1	1	2	6	8	−2	3	
5	Estibadores Navales	4	1	0	3	7	7	0	2	

==== Results ====
Home \ Away	BAR	ESN	LDQ	PAT	POL
Barcelona			3–1	0–0	
Estibadores Navales	0–1		4–0		
LDU Quito				4–0	1–1
Patria		3–1			2–1
Politécnico	2–0	3–2			

Legend: Blue = home team win; Yellow = draw; Red = away team win.

=== Group B ===
==== Standings ====
Pos	Team	Pld	W	D	L	GF	GA	GD	Pts	Qualification
1	Emelec	5	4	1	0	10	1	+9	9	Advanced to the Final Stage
2	Deportivo Quito	5	4	1	0	13	4	+9	9	Advanced to the Final Stage
3	Macará	5	2	0	3	7	6	+1	4	
4	9 de Octubre	5	1	1	3	8	9	−1	3	
5	Aucas	5	2	0	3	5	11	−6	4	
6	River Plate de Riobamba	5	0	1	4	3	15	−12	1	

==== Results ====
Home \ Away	9OC	AUC	QUI	EME	MAC	RPR
9 de Octubre			1–2		3–1	
Aucas	3–2					2–0
Deportivo Quito		3–0		1–1	2–1	
Emelec	1–0	4–0				3–0
Macará		2–0		0–1		3–0
River Plate de Riobamba	2–2		1–5			

Legend: Blue = home team win; Yellow = draw; Red = away team win.

== Final stage ==
=== Standings ===
Pos	Team	Pld	W	D	L	GF	GA	GD	Pts	Qualification or relegation
1	Barcelona	6	4	1	1	12	3	+9	9	1964 Copa de Campeones
2	Emelec	6	3	2	1	9	2	+7	8	
3	Deportivo Quito	6	3	0	3	6	11	−5	6	
4	Politécnico	6	0	1	5	2	13	−11	1	

Campeonato Ecuatoriano de Fútbol
1963 champion
Barcelona
2nd title

=== Results ===
Home \ Away	BAR	QUI	EME	POL
Barcelona		1–0	0–0	3–1
Deportivo Quito	0–5		1–0	2–1
Emelec	2–0	4–1		3–0
Politécnico	0–3	0–2	0–0	

Legend: Blue = home team win; Yellow = draw; Red = away team win.
