= 1988 Campeonato Ecuatoriano de Fútbol Serie A =

Campeonato Ecuatoriano de Fútbol
- Season: 1988
- Champions: Emelec
- Relegated: América de Quito
- Copa Libertadores: Emelec; Deportivo Quito
- Matches: 332
- Goals: 819 (2.47 per match)

The 1988 Campeonato Ecuatoriano de Fútbol de la Serie A was the 30th national championship for football teams in Ecuador.

== Teams ==
The number of teams for this season was played by 18 teams.

Club	City
América de Quito	Quito
Aucas	Quito
Audaz Octubrino	Machala
Barcelona	Guayaquil
Deportivo Cuenca	Cuenca
Deportivo Quevedo	Quevedo
Deportivo Quito	Quito
El Nacional	Quito
Emelec	Guayaquil
Esmeraldas Petrolero	Esmeraldas
Filanbanco	Guayaquil
Juventus	Esmeraldas
LDU Portoviejo	Portoviejo
LDU Quito	Quito
Macará	Ambato
River Plate de Riobamba	Chimborazo
Técnico Universitario	Ambato
Universidad Católica	Quito

== First stage ==
Pos	Team	Pld	W	D	L	GF	GA	GD	Pts	Qualification or relegation
1	LDU Quito	34	20	9	5	64	36	+28	49	Qualification to the Second stage
2	Emelec	34	16	12	6	56	36	+20	44	Qualification to the Second stage
3	Macará	34	13	15	6	50	32	+18	41	Qualification to the Second stage
4	Barcelona	34	13	14	7	50	25	+25	40	Qualification to the Second stage
5	Deportivo Quito	34	13	13	8	48	43	+5	39	Qualification to the Second stage
6	Universidad Católica	34	13	10	11	45	37	+8	36	Qualification to the Second stage
7	Filanbanco	34	14	8	12	38	33	+5	36	Qualification to the Second stage
8	El Nacional	34	12	11	11	49	41	+8	35	Qualification to the Second stage
9	Técnico Universitario	34	11	12	11	42	39	+3	34	
10	Aucas	34	11	12	11	45	49	−4	34	
11	Deportivo Cuenca	34	7	19	8	41	45	−4	33	
12	Esmeraldas Petrolero	34	11	10	13	40	50	−10	32	
13	Audaz Octubrino	34	12	7	15	32	43	−11	31	
14	Deportivo Quevedo	34	10	8	16	27	44	−17	28	
15	Juventus	34	7	13	14	31	44	−13	27	
16	LDU Portoviejo	34	9	9	16	34	50	−16	27	
17	River Plate de Riobamba	34	9	7	18	27	53	−26	25	
18	América de Quito	34	5	11	18	29	48	−19	21	Relegated to the Serie B

Source: RSSSF - 1988 Serie A

== Second stage ==
=== Group A ===
Pos	Team	Pld	W	D	L	GF	GA	GD	Pts	Qualification or relegation
1	Deportivo Quito	6	2	4	0	8	4	+4	8	Qualified to the Final
2	LDU Quito (Note: LDU Quito were awarded two points.)	6	3	1	2	10	11	−1	8	
3	Macará	6	2	2	2	11	8	+3	6	
4	Filanbanco	6	1	1	4	5	11	−6	3	

Source: RSSSF - 1988 Serie A

=== Group B ===
Pos	Team	Pld	W	D	L	GF	GA	GD	Pts	Qualification or relegation
1	Emelec	6	2	4	0	7	4	+3	8	Qualified to the Final
2	Barcelona	6	2	3	1	8	5	+3	7	
3	El Nacional	6	2	2	2	9	10	−1	6	
4	Universidad Católica	6	1	1	4	8	13	−5	3	

Source: RSSSF - 1988 Serie A

== Final ==
19 November 1988

Emelec	3–0	Deportivo Quito

27 November 1988

Deportivo Quito	1–1	Emelec

Campeonato Ecuatoriano de Fútbol
1988 champion
