= 1986 Campeonato Ecuatoriano de Fútbol Serie A =

Campeonato Ecuatoriano de Fútbol
- Season: 1986
- Champions: El Nacional
- Relegated: 9 de Octubre
- Copa Libertadores: El Nacional; Barcelona
- Matches played: 308
- Goals scored: 766 (2.49 per match)

The 1986 Campeonato Ecuatoriano de Fútbol de la Serie A was the 28th national championship for football teams in Ecuador.

== Teams ==
The number of teams for this season was played by 16 teams.

Club	City
9 de Octubre	Guayaquil
América de Quito	Quito
Audaz Octubrino	Machala
Barcelona	Guayaquil
Deportivo Cuenca	Cuenca
Deportivo Quevedo	Quevedo
Deportivo Quito	Quito
El Nacional	Quito
Emelec	Guayaquil
Esmeraldas Petrolero	Esmeraldas
Filanbanco	Guayaquil
LDU Portoviejo	Portoviejo
LDU Quito	Quito
Macará	Ambato
Técnico Universitario	Ambato
Universidad Católica	Quito

== First stage ==
=== Group A ===
Pos	Team	Pld	W	D	L	GF	GA	GD	Pts	Qualification or relegation
1	Deportivo Quito	14	9	2	3	34	13	+21	20	
2	Emelec	14	8	2	4	20	16	+4	18	
3	Barcelona	14	6	4	4	21	16	+5	16	
4	Audaz Octubrino	14	6	3	5	13	13	0	15	
5	Deportivo Quevedo	14	5	5	4	18	21	−3	15	
6	Macará	14	3	6	5	12	17	−5	12	
7	Universidad Católica	14	4	3	7	15	21	−6	11	
8	América de Quito	14	1	3	10	9	28	−19	5	Cuadrangular del No Descenso

Source: RSSSF - 1986 Serie A

=== Group B ===
Pos	Team	Pld	W	D	L	GF	GA	GD	Pts	Qualification or relegation
1	El Nacional	14	9	3	2	33	11	+22	21	
2	Filanbanco	14	8	4	2	23	14	+9	20	
3	LDU Quito	14	8	3	3	28	16	+12	19	
4	Esmeraldas Petrolero	14	5	4	5	16	16	0	14	
5	Técnico Universitario	14	4	4	6	14	17	−3	12	
6	Deportivo Cuenca	14	4	4	6	12	17	−5	12	
7	LDU Portoviejo	14	4	1	9	14	36	−22	9	
8	9 de Octubre	14	2	1	11	13	26	−13	5	Cuadrangular del No Descenso

Source: RSSSF - 1986 Serie A

== Second stage ==
=== Group A ===
Pos	Team	Pld	W	D	L	GF	GA	GD	Pts	Qualification or relegation
1	Filanbanco	14	6	6	2	18	8	+10	18	
2	Deportivo Quito	14	6	5	3	24	16	+8	17	
3	Barcelona	14	7	2	5	17	13	+4	16	
4	Deportivo Cuenca	14	5	5	4	14	13	+1	15	
5	Esmeraldas Petrolero	14	5	3	6	14	14	0	13	
6	Deportivo Quevedo	14	4	3	7	11	18	−7	11	
7	9 de Octubre	14	3	4	7	16	23	−7	10	
8	Universidad Católica	14	4	2	8	14	23	−9	10	Cuadrangular del No Descenso

Source: RSSSF - 1986 Serie A

=== Group B ===
Pos	Team	Pld	W	D	L	GF	GA	GD	Pts	Qualification or relegation
1	Técnico Universitario	14	8	2	4	22	15	+7	18	
2	El Nacional	14	9	4	1	30	14	+16	22	
3	Audaz Octubrino	14	4	3	7	13	17	−4	11	
4	Emelec	14	5	5	4	19	14	+5	15	
5	América de Quito	14	4	3	7	13	17	−4	11	
6	LDU Quito	14	4	3	7	20	26	−6	11	
7	Macará	14	4	2	8	18	24	−6	10	
8	LDU Portoviejo	14	2	7	5	15	22	−7	11	Cuadrangular del No Descenso

Source: RSSSF - 1986 Serie A

== Third stage ==
=== Group A ===
Pos	Team	Pld	W	D	L	GF	GA	GD	Pts	Qualification or relegation
1	Deportivo Cuenca	10	6	3	1	15	5	+10	15	Qualified to the Cuadrangular Final
2	Técnico Universitario (Note: Técnico Universitario were awarded 1.5.)	10	5	3	2	14	9	+5	14.5	Qualified to the Cuadrangular Final
3	Deportivo Quito (Note: Deportivo Quito were awarded 2.5.)	10	3	5	2	16	10	+6	13.5	
4	Emelec (Note: Emelec were awarded 1.)	10	4	1	5	13	13	0	10	
5	LDU Quito (Note: LDU Quito were awarded 0.5.)	10	2	5	3	10	12	−2	9.5	
6	Deportivo Quevedo	10	0	3	7	5	24	−19	3	

Source: RSSSF - 1986 Serie A

=== Group B ===
Pos	Team	Pld	W	D	L	GF	GA	GD	Pts	Qualification or relegation
1	El Nacional (Note: El Nacional were awarded 2.5.)	10	6	3	1	23	10	+13	17.5	Qualified to the Cuadrangular Final
2	Barcelona (Note: Barcelonawere awarded 1.)	10	7	1	2	19	7	+12	16	Qualified to the Cuadrangular Final
3	Filanbanco (Note: Filanbanco were awarded 2.5.)	10	3	6	1	14	13	+1	14.5	
4	Macará	10	3	2	5	16	24	−8	8	
5	Audaz Octubrino (Note: Audaz Octubrino were awarded 0.5.)	10	2	1	7	8	18	−10	5.5	
6	Esmeraldas Petrolero	10	1	3	6	6	13	−7	5	

Source: RSSSF - 1986 Serie A

== Cuadrangular del No Descenso ==
Pos	Team	Pld	W	D	L	GF	GA	GD	Pts	Qualification or relegation
1	Universidad Católica (Note: Universidad Católica were deducted 0.5.)	6	4	0	2	10	6	+4	7.5	
2	LDU Portoviejo (Note: LDU Portoviejo were deducted 1.5.)	6	3	2	1	12	12	0	7.5	
3	América de Quito (Note: América de Quito were deducted 2.5.)	6	3	1	2	7	5	+2	6.5	
4	9 de Octubre (Note: 9 de Octubre were deducted 0.5.)	6	0	1	5	8	14	−6	0.5	Relegated to the Serie B

Source: RSSSF - 1984 Serie A

== Cuadrangular Final ==
Pos	Team	Pld	W	D	L	GF	GA	GD	Pts	Qualification
1	El Nacional (Note: El Nacional were awarded one point.) (C)	6	4	1	1	9	2	+7	10	1987 Copa Libertadores
2	Barcelona	6	3	1	2	7	6	+1	7	1987 Copa Libertadores
3	Técnico Universitario	6	2	2	2	6	6	0	6	
4	Deportivo Cuenca (Note: Deportivo Cuenca were awarded one point.)	6	1	0	5	3	11	−8	3	

Source: RSSSF - 1986 Serie A
(C) Champions
Notes:

Campeonato Ecuatoriano de Fútbol
1986 champion
El Nacional
