= Paulo Massa =

Brazilian football manager

Personal information
- Full name: Paulo Massa
- Date of birth: 21 March 1940
- Place of birth: Rio de Janeiro, Brazil
- Date of death: 12 July 2016 (aged 76)
- Place of death: Rio de Janeiro, Brazil

Managerial career
- Years: Team
- 1987–1988: Americano
- 1988: Qatar SC
- 1989: Cabofriense
- 1990: Itaperuna
- 1990: Brazil U20
- 1990: Saudi Arabia
- 1991: Bangu
- 1991–1993: Al Ahli SC
- 1994: Itaperuna
- 1995–1997: El Nacional
- 1998: LDU Quito
- 1999–2000: Emelec
- 2000: Americano
- 2001: Barcelona SC
- 2002–2003: El Nacional

Paulo Massa (21 March 1940 – 12 July 2016), was a Brazilian professional football manager.

== Career ==
Born in Rio de Janeiro, Paulo Massa managed Americano in particular, as well as clubs in Qatar, Brazil Under-20, Saudi Arabia and teams from Ecuador, where he was notable for winning the national championship twice, with El Nacional in 1996 and with LDU Quito in 1998.

== Honours ==
Al Ahli SC

- Emir of Qatar Cup: 1992

El Nacional

- Ecuadorian Serie A: 1996

LDU Quito

- Ecuadorian Serie A: 1998
