= 1967 Campeonato Ecuatoriano de Fútbol Serie A =

Campeonato Ecuatoriano de Fútbol
- Season: 1967
- Champions: El Nacional (1st title)
- Relegated: Español; Patria
- Copa Libertadores: El Nacional; Emelec
- Matches played: 91
- Goals scored: 224 (2.46 per match)
- Top goalscorer: Tom Rodríguez (16 goals)
- Biggest home win: Barcelona 4–0 Politécnico; El Nacional 4–0 Barcelona; LDU Quito 4–0 Español; El Nacional 5–1 Manta Sport; Emelec 5–1 Español
- Biggest away win: Manta Sport 0–2 Patria; Patria 0–2 El Nacional; Politécnico 3–5 El Nacional
- Highest scoring: Politécnico 3–5 El Nacional

The 1967 Campeonato Ecuatoriano de Fútbol (English: Ecuadorian Football Championship) was the 9th national championship for football teams in Ecuador. This season marked the first time the national championship was contested as a league and not as a tournament in which teams had to qualified for. With the creation of the Segunda Categoria this same season, a system of promotion and relegation was also implemented.

El Nacional won their first national title this season, just three years after being founded.

== Teams ==
Ten teams participated this season (home city in parentheses).

- América (Quito)
- Barcelona (Guayaquil)
- El Nacional (Quito)
- Emelec (Guayaquil)
- Español (Guayaquil)
- LDU Quito (Quito)
- Macará (Ambato)
- Manta Sport (Manta)
- Patria (Guayaquil)
- Politécnico (Quito)

== Standings ==
Pos	Team	Pld	W	D	L	GF	GA	GD	Pts	Qualification or relegation
1	El Nacional	18	12	2	4	34	17	+17	26	1968 Copa Libertadores
2	Emelec	18	9	6	3	26	16	+10	24	1968 Copa Libertadores
3	Barcelona	18	7	5	6	21	21	0	19	
4	América de Quito	18	8	3	7	19	19	0	19	
5	LDU Quito	18	8	2	8	29	23	+6	18	
6	Politécnico	18	5	6	7	20	24	−4	16	
7	Macará	18	5	6	7	19	25	−6	16	
8	Patria	18	4	7	7	16	20	−4	15	Relegation Playoff
9	Manta	18	5	5	8	22	28	−6	15	Relegation Playoff
10	Español	18	4	4	10	15	28	−13	12	Relegation to Segunda Categoría

Source: RSSSF
Rules for classification: 1st points

Campeonato Ecuatoriano de Fútbol
1967 champion
El Nacional
1st title

== Results ==
Home \ Away	AMQ	BAR	NAC	EME	ESP	LDQ	MAC	MSC	PAT	POL
América de Quito		1–0	2–0	0–1	0–0	0–1	2–0	2–1	2–1	1–1
Barcelona	1–0		2–1	1–0	1–1	1–0	2–0	2–1	0–0	4–0
El Nacional	3–0	4–0		2–1	1–0	2–1	1–0	5–1	2–0	0–0
Emelec	2–1	1–1	0–0		5–1	1–0	2–2	2–1	2–0	1–0
Español	1–2	2–2	1–2	0–1		0–1	2–0	0–0	1–0	1–0
LDU Quito	3–1	3–1	3–1	2–1	4–0		2–3	2–1	1–1	1–1
Macará	0–1	1–1	2–1	1–1	1–2	1–0		1–1	1–1	2–1
Manta	2–1	2–1	1–2	2–2	3–2	3–2	3–1		0–2	0–0
Patria	1–1	2–0	0–2	1–1	3–1	2–1	1–2	0–0		1–1
Politécnico	1–2	2–1	3–5	1–2	2–0	3–2	1–1	1–0	2–0	

Source: RSSSF
Legend: Blue = home team win; Yellow = draw; Red = away team win.

== Relegation playoff ==
Since Manta and Patria were tied on points, a playoff was played in Cuenca to determine the last team to be relegated.

Team 1	Score	Team 2
Manta	2–1	Patria
