= 1976 Campeonato Ecuatoriano de Fútbol Serie A =

Campeonato Ecuatoriano de Fútbol
- Season: 1976
- Champions: El Nacional
- Relegated: 9 de Octubre; América de Quito; Audaz Octubrino; Deportivo Quito
- Copa Libertadores: El Nacional; Deportivo Cuenca
- Matches: 194
- Goals: 522 (2.69 per match)

The 1976 Campeonato Ecuatoriano de Fútbol de la Serie A was the 18th national championship for football teams in Ecuador.

== Teams ==
The number of teams for this season was played by 12 teams. Carmen Mora and Deportivo Quito promoted as winners of First Stage of Serie B.

Club	City
9 de Octubre	Guayaquil
América de Quito	Quito
Audaz Octubrino	Machala
Aucas	Quito
Barcelona	Guayaquil
Carmen Mora	Machala
Deportivo Cuenca	Cuenca
Deportivo Quito	Quito
El Nacional	Quito
Emelec	Guayaquil
LDU Quito	Quito
Universidad Católica	Quito

== First stage ==
Pos	Team	Pld	W	D	L	GF	GA	GD	Pts	Qualification or relegation
1	El Nacional	18	13	2	3	36	21	+15	28	Qualified to the Liguilla Final
2	Emelec	18	9	5	4	29	24	+5	23	Qualified to the Liguilla Final
3	Deportivo Cuenca	18	8	5	5	34	21	+13	21	Qualified to the Liguilla Final
4	Audaz Octubrino	18	8	5	5	30	27	+3	21	
5	LDU Quito	18	6	6	6	26	22	+4	18	
6	Barcelona	18	5	6	7	26	20	+6	16	
7	Universidad Católica	18	6	4	8	26	22	+4	16	
8	Aucas	18	6	4	8	18	28	−10	16	
9	América de Quito	18	4	4	10	23	36	−13	12	Relegated to the Serie B
10	9 de Octubre	18	3	3	12	11	38	−27	9	Relegated to the Serie B

Source: RSSSF - 1976 Serie A

== Second stage ==
Pos	Team	Pld	W	D	L	GF	GA	GD	Pts	Qualification or relegation
1	El Nacional	18	10	3	5	35	19	+16	23	Qualified to the Liguilla Final
2	LDU Quito	18	8	5	5	27	21	+6	21	Qualified to the Liguilla Final
3	Deportivo Cuenca	18	8	4	6	28	20	+8	20	Qualified to the Liguilla Final
4	Emelec	18	6	7	5	23	19	+4	19	
5	Aucas	18	7	5	6	22	27	−5	19	
6	Barcelona	18	6	6	6	24	21	+3	18	
7	Carmen Mora	18	5	7	6	22	27	−5	17	
8	Universidad Católica	18	5	6	7	20	22	−2	16	
9	Deportivo Quito	18	5	6	7	18	26	−8	16	Relegated to the Serie B
10	Audaz Octubrino	18	3	5	10	17	34	−17	11	Relegated to the Serie B

Source: RSSSF - 1976 Serie A

== Liguilla Final ==
Pos	Team	Pld	W	D	L	GF	GA	GD	Pts	Qualification
1	El Nacional (Note: El Nacional were awarded six points.) (C)	6	3	2	1	8	6	+2	14	1977 Copa Libertadores
2	Deportivo Cuenca (Note: Deportivo Cuenca were awarded two points.)	6	3	1	2	5	4	+1	9	1977 Copa Libertadores
3	Emelec (Note: Emelec were awarded two points.)	6	3	1	2	6	8	−2	9	
4	LDU Quito (Note: LDU Quito were awarded two points.)	6	1	0	5	6	7	−1	4	

Source: RSSSF - 1976 Serie A
(C) Champions

=== Second-place play-offs ===
Deportivo Cuenca	2–0	Emelec

Emelec	0–0	Deportivo Cuenca

Campeonato Ecuatoriano de Fútbol
1976 champion
