= Polo Carrera =

Ecuadorian footballer (born 1945)

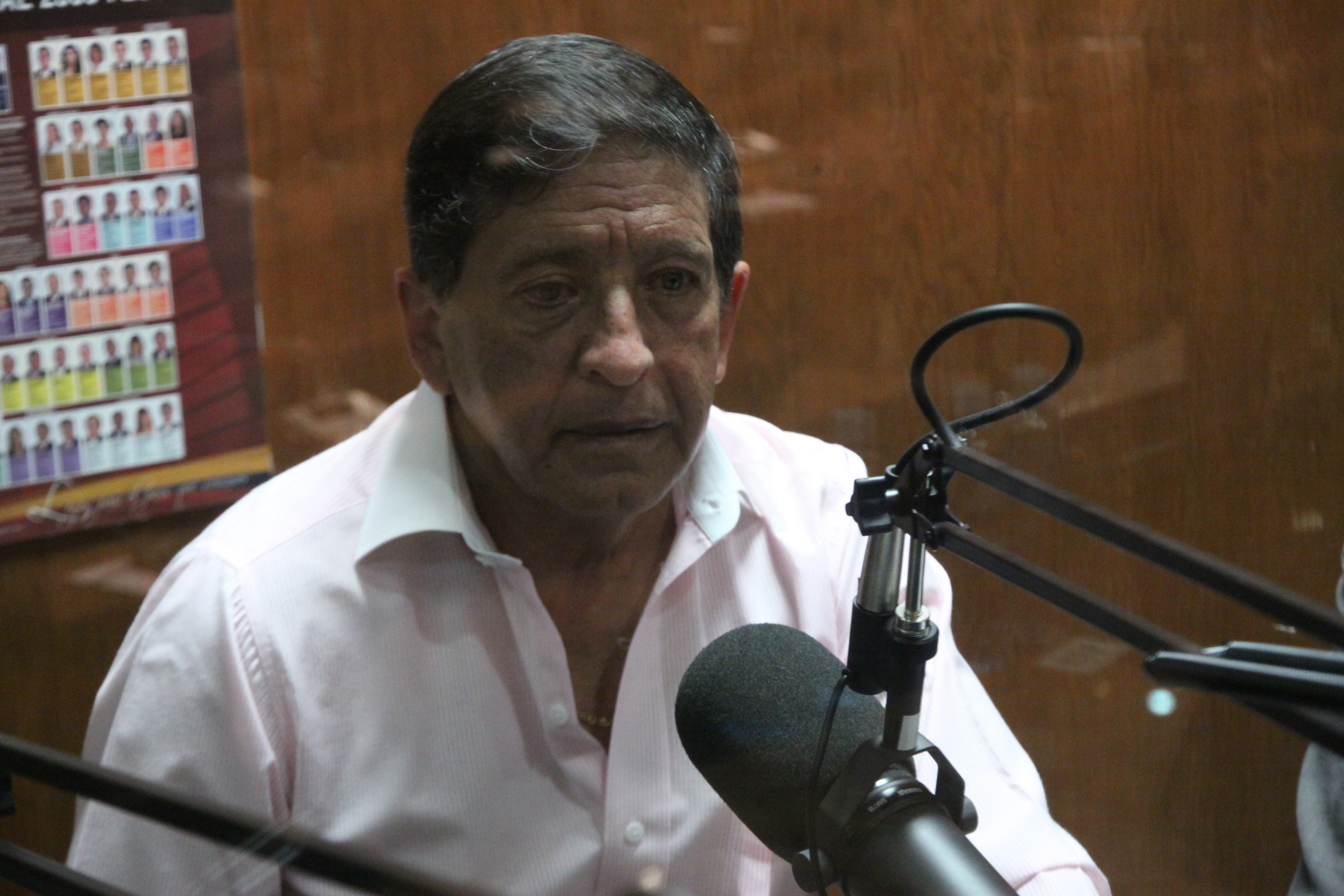

Personal information
- Full name: Paúl Fernando Carrera Velasteguí
- Date of birth: January 11, 1945 (age 81)
- Place of birth: Quito, Ecuador
- Position: Forward

Senior career*
Years	Team	Apps	(Gls)
1960–1964	LDU Quito		
1965	Deportivo Quito		
1965–1967	LDU Quito		
1966	Fluminense		
1967	Barcelona		
1968–1969	Peñarol		
1970	River Plate (URU)		
1971–1973	El Nacional		
1974	Universidad Católica		
1975–1977	LDU Quito		
1978–1980	Universidad Católica		
1981	América de Quito		
1982	LDU Quito		
1983	Deportivo Quito		
1984	LDU Quito		
Total		?	(?)

International career^{‡}
1966–1983	Ecuador	20	(3)

Managerial career
- 1990–1991: LDU Quito
- 1992–1993: ESPOLI
- 1994: El Nacional
- 1995: Aucas
- 1996–1997: Deportivo Quito
- 1998: Ecuador
- 1999: ESPOLI
- 2009: Aucas
- * Club domestic league appearances and goals as of September 22, 2009 ‡ National team caps and goals as of September 22, 2009

Paúl Fernando Carrera Velasteguí, known better as Polo Carrera (born January 11, 1945, in Quito), is an Ecuadorian retired football player and former manager. He has played for clubs in Ecuador and Uruguay, as well as the Ecuador football team

== Club career ==
Carrera started his career at LDU Quito at the age of 15 in 1960, where he stayed until he transferred to Peñarol of Uruguay in 1968.

He then transferred to cross-town team River Plate de Montevideo in 1970. He then returned to Ecuador to play for several clubs until his retirement in 1984.

He was the all-time top goalscorer in the Copa Libertadores tournament for LDU Quito with 12 goals, until surpassed by Patricio Urrutia.

== Coaching career ==
Since retiring from football, Carrera started his coaching career in 1990 with LDU Quito as a manager at the senior level. He was the senior team coach from 1990 to 1991, where he guided the club to their improbable 4th Serie A title in 1990, after a 15-year title drought. He later coached the Ecuador national team in 1998 with little success.

Starting in 2000, he held various elected positions in government.

In August 2009 he was named as manager at Sociedad Deportiva Aucas.

== Honors ==
=== As a player ===
Peñarol

- Primera División: 1968

El Nacional

- Serie A: 1972

LDU Quito

- Serie A: 1975

=== As a manager ===
LDU Quito

- Serie A: 1990

ESPOLI

- Serie B: 1993
