= 1977 Campeonato Ecuatoriano de Fútbol Serie A =

Campeonato Ecuatoriano de Fútbol
- Season: 1977
- Champions: El Nacional
- Relegated: Aucas; América de Quito; Carmen Mora; LDU Cuenca
- Copa Libertadores: El Nacional; LDU Quito
- Matches: 210
- Goals: 561 (2.67 per match)

The 1977 Campeonato Ecuatoriano de Fútbol de la Serie A was the 19th national championship for football teams in Ecuador.

== Teams ==
The number of teams for this season was played by 12 teams. LDU Cuenca and Manta promoted as winners of First Stage of Serie B.

Club	City
América de Quito	Quito
Aucas	Quito
Barcelona	Guayaquil
Carmen Mora	Machala
Deportivo Cuenca	Cuenca
El Nacional	Quito
Emelec	Guayaquil
LDU Cuenca	Cuenca
LDU Portoviejo	Portoviejo
LDU Quito	Quito
Manta	Manta
Universidad Católica	Quito

== First stage ==
Pos	Team	Pld	W	D	L	GF	GA	GD	Pts	Qualification or relegation
1	LDU Quito	18	8	9	1	27	13	+14	25	Qualified to the Liguilla Final
2	Universidad Católica	18	8	6	4	32	21	+11	22	Qualified to the Liguilla Final
3	Emelec	18	9	4	5	25	19	+6	22	Qualified to the Liguilla Final
4	Barcelona	18	6	9	3	24	16	+8	21	
5	Deportivo Cuenca	18	8	4	6	25	25	0	20	
6	LDU Portoviejo	18	8	3	7	30	25	+5	19	
7	El Nacional	18	6	4	8	20	19	+1	16	
8	Carmen Mora	18	6	3	9	19	27	−8	15	
9	Aucas	18	5	5	8	16	27	−11	15	Relegated to the Serie B
10	América de Quito	18	1	3	14	7	33	−26	5	Relegated to the Serie B

Source: RSSSF - 1977 Serie A

== Second stage ==
Pos	Team	Pld	W	D	L	GF	GA	GD	Pts	Qualification or relegation
1	Barcelona	18	11	2	5	29	20	+9	24	Qualified to the Liguilla Final
2	El Nacional	18	9	4	5	33	18	+15	22	Qualified to the Liguilla Final
3	Deportivo Cuenca	18	8	4	6	28	20	+8	20	Qualified to the Liguilla Final
4	LDU Portoviejo	18	8	4	6	30	27	+3	20	
5	Emelec	18	8	3	7	28	23	+5	19	
6	Universidad Católica	18	7	5	6	27	24	+3	19	
7	Manta	18	7	4	7	30	31	−1	18	
8	LDU Quito	18	5	7	6	16	20	−4	17	
9	Carmen Mora	18	4	6	8	14	29	−15	14	Relegated to the Serie B
10	LDU Cuenca	18	1	5	12	17	40	−23	7	Relegated to the Serie B

Source: RSSSF - 1977 Serie A

== Liguilla Final ==
Pos	Team	Pld	W	D	L	GF	GA	GD	Pts	Qualification
1	El Nacional (Note: El Nacional were awarded two points.) (C)	10	6	4	0	17	4	+13	18	1978 Copa Libertadores
2	LDU Quito (Note: LDU Quito were awarded three points.)	10	4	2	4	11	14	−3	13	1978 Copa Libertadores
3	Universidad Católica (Note: Universidad Católica were awarded two points.)	10	4	2	4	14	19	−5	12	
4	Barcelona (Note: Barcelona were awarded three points.)	10	3	2	5	16	15	+1	11	
5	Deportivo Cuenca (Note: Deportivo Cuenca were awarded one point.)	10	2	4	4	14	17	−3	9	
6	Emelec (Note: Emelec were awarded one point.)	10	2	4	4	12	15	−3	9	

Source: RSSSF - 1977 Serie A
(C) Champions
Notes:

Campeonato Ecuatoriano de Fútbol
1977 champion
