= 1987 Copa Libertadores =

1987 Copa Libertadores de América
Tournament details
- Dates: March 6 – October 31
- Teams: 21 (from 10 associations)

Final positions
- Champions: (Uruguay) Peñarol (5th title)
- Runners-up: (Colombia) América de Cali

Tournament statistics
- Matches played: 76
- Goals scored: 207 (2.72 per match)
- Top scorer: (Argentina) Ricardo Gareca (7 Goals)

The 1987 Copa Libertadores was the 28th edition of the Copa Libertadores, CONMEBOL's annual international club tournament. Peñarol won the competition for their fifth title after beating América de Cali in the finals.

== Qualified teams ==
Country	Team	Qualification method
CONMEBOL (1 berth)	River Plate	1986 Copa Libertadores champion
Argentina (2 berths)	Rosario Central	1986–87 Primera División champion
Argentina (2 berths)	Independiente	1986–87 Liguilla Pre-Libertadores winner
Bolivia (2 berths)	The Strongest	1986 Primera División champion
Bolivia (2 berths)	Oriente Petrolero	1986 Primera División runner-up
Brazil (2 berths)	São Paulo	1986 Campeonato Brasileiro Série A champion
Brazil (2 berths)	Guarani	1986 Campeonato Brasileiro Série A runner-up
Chile (2 berths)	Colo-Colo	1986 Primera División champion
Chile (2 berths)	Cobreloa	1986 Liguilla Pre-Libertadores winner
Colombia (2 berths)	América de Cali	1986 Campeonato Profesional champion
Colombia (2 berths)	Deportivo Cali	1986 Campeonato Profesional runner-up
Ecuador (2 berths)	El Nacional	1986 Campeonato Ecuatoriano champion
Ecuador (2 berths)	Barcelona	1986 Campeonato Ecuatoriano runner-up
Paraguay (2 berths)	Sol de América	1986 Primera División champion
Paraguay (2 berths)	Olimpia	1986 Primera División runner-up
Peru (2 berths)	San Agustín	1986 Primera División champion
Peru (2 berths)	Alianza Lima	1986 Primera División runner-up
Uruguay (2 berths)	Peñarol	1986 Liguilla Pre-Libertadores winner
Uruguay (2 berths)	Progreso	1986 Liguilla Pre-Libertadores runner-up
Venezuela (2 berths)	Unión Atlético Táchira	1986 Primera División champion
Venezuela (2 berths)	Estudiantes de Mérida	1986 Primera División runner-up

== Draw ==
The champions and runners-up of each football association were drawn into the same group along with another football association's participating teams. Three clubs from Argentina competed as River Plate was champion of the 1986 Copa Libertadores. They entered the tournament in the Semifinals.

Group 1	Group 2	Group 3	Group 4	Group 5
Argentina; Venezuela	Bolivia; Colombia	Brazil; Chile	Ecuador; Paraguay	Peru; Uruguay

== Group stage ==
=== Group 1 ===
Pos	Team	Pld	W	D	L	GF	GA	GD	Pts	Qualification	(Argentina) IND	(Argentina) ROS	(Venezuela) TAC	(Venezuela) EST
1	(Argentina) Independiente	6	4	1	1	13	4	+9	9	Semifinals	—	3–1	5–0	2–0
2	(Argentina) Rosario Central	6	3	2	1	12	7	+5	8		0–0	—	3–2	5–2
3	(Venezuela) Unión Atlético Táchira	6	3	1	2	11	12	−1	7		3–2	0–0	—	3–2
4	(Venezuela) Estudiantes de Mérida	6	0	0	6	4	17	−13	0		0–1	0–3	0–3	—

=== Group 2 ===
Pos	Team	Pld	W	D	L	GF	GA	GD	Pts	Qualification	(Colombia) AME	(Colombia) CAL	(Bolivia) STR	(Bolivia) OPE
1	(Colombia) América de Cali	6	3	2	1	13	5	+8	8	Semifinals	—	1–0	6–0	3–1
2	(Colombia) Deportivo Cali	6	4	0	2	13	5	+8	8		2–1	—	4–0	5–1
3	(Bolivia) The Strongest	6	2	1	3	7	16	−9	5		1–1	2–1	—	3–2
4	(Bolivia) Oriente Petrolero	6	1	1	4	7	14	−7	3		1–1	0–1	2–1	—

==== Tiebreaker ====
Team 1	Score	Team 2
América de Cali (Colombia)	0–0 (4–2 p)	(Colombia) Deportivo Cali

=== Group 3 ===
Pos	Team	Pld	W	D	L	GF	GA	GD	Pts	Qualification	(Chile) COB	(Chile) COL	(Brazil) GUA	(Brazil) SAO
1	(Chile) Cobreloa	6	3	2	1	8	4	+4	8	Semifinals	—	1–0	3–1	3–1
2	(Chile) Colo-Colo	6	2	3	1	6	4	+2	7		0–0	—	2–0	2–2
3	(Brazil) Guarani	6	1	3	2	6	8	−2	5		0–0	0–0	—	3–1
4	(Brazil) São Paulo	6	1	2	3	9	13	−4	4		2–1	1–2	2–2	—

=== Group 4 ===
Pos	Team	Pld	W	D	L	GF	GA	GD	Pts	Qualification	(Ecuador) BAR	(Paraguay) OLI	(Ecuador) NAC	(Paraguay) SOL
1	(Ecuador) Barcelona	6	4	0	2	8	7	+1	8	Semifinals	—	3–2	2–1	1–0
2	(Paraguay) Olimpia	6	3	1	2	9	10	−1	7		1–0	—	2–0	2–1
3	(Ecuador) El Nacional	6	3	0	3	12	7	+5	6		2–0	4–0	—	4–1
4	(Paraguay) Sol de América	6	1	1	4	7	12	−5	3		1–2	2–2	2–1	—

=== Group 5 ===
Pos	Team	Pld	W	D	L	GF	GA	GD	Pts	Qualification	(Uruguay) PEÑ	(Peru) ALI	(Uruguay) PRO	(Peru) AGU
1	(Uruguay) Peñarol	6	4	2	0	10	4	+6	10	Semifinals	—	2–0	3–2	2–0
2	(Peru) Alianza Lima	6	2	2	2	4	4	0	6		0–1	—	0–0	2–1
3	(Uruguay) Progreso	6	1	3	2	7	7	0	5		1–1	0–0	—	3–0
4	(Peru) San Agustín	6	1	1	4	5	11	−6	3		1–1	0–2	3–1	—

== Semifinals ==
=== Group 1 ===
Pos	Team	Pld	W	D	L	GF	GA	GD	Pts	Qualification	(Colombia) AME	(Chile) COB	(Ecuador) BAR
1	(Colombia) América de Cali	4	2	2	0	9	3	+6	6	Finals	—	1–1	4–0
2	(Chile) Cobreloa	4	2	2	0	8	3	+5	6		2–2	—	3–0
3	(Ecuador) Barcelona	4	0	0	4	0	11	−11	0		0–2	0–2	—

=== Group 2 ===
Pos	Team	Pld	W	D	L	GF	GA	GD	Pts	Qualification	(Uruguay) PEÑ	(Argentina) RIV	(Argentina) IND
1	(Uruguay) Peñarol	4	2	1	1	7	3	+4	5	Finals	—	0–0	3–0
2	(Argentina) River Plate	4	1	2	1	2	2	0	4		1–0	—	0–0
3	(Argentina) Independiente	4	1	1	2	4	8	−4	3		2–4	2–1	—

== Finals ==
Team 1	Agg.	Team 2	1st leg	2nd leg
América de Cali (Colombia)	N/A	(Uruguay) Peñarol	2–0	1–2

=== Playoff ===
31 October 1987	Peñarol (Uruguay)	1–0 (a.e.t.)	(Colombia) América de Cali	Estadio Nacional, Santiago, Chile
	Aguirre 120'	Report		Attendance: 25,000; Referee: Hernán Silva (Chile)

1987 Copa Libertadores Winner

Peñarol
Fifth Title
