= 1982 Campeonato Ecuatoriano de Fútbol Serie A =

Campeonato Ecuatoriano de Fútbol
- Season: 1982
- Champions: El Nacional
- Copa Libertadores: El Nacional; Barcelona

The 1982 Campeonato Ecuatoriano de Fútbol de la Serie A was the 24th national championship for football teams in Ecuador.

== Teams ==
The number of teams for this season was played by 12 teams. Aucas and Deportivo Quevedo promoted as winners of First Stage of Serie B.

Club	City
9 de Octubre	Guayaquil
Aucas	Quito
Barcelona	Guayaquil
Deportivo Quevedo	Quevedo
Deportivo Quito	Quito
El Nacional	Quito
Emelec	Guayaquil
Everest	Guayaquil
LDU Portoviejo	Portoviejo
LDU Quito	Quito
Técnico Universitario	Ambato
Universidad Católica	Quito

== First stage ==
Pos	Team	Pld	W	D	L	GF	GA	GD	Pts	Qualification or relegation
1	El Nacional	18	10	3	5	33	25	+8	23	Qualified to the Liguilla Final
2	LDU Portoviejo	18	10	2	6	31	23	+8	22	Qualified to the Liguilla Final
3	Barcelona	18	9	4	5	28	23	+5	22	Qualified to the Liguilla Final
4	Emelec	18	8	4	6	22	20	+2	20	
5	Deportivo Quito	18	6	6	6	24	20	+4	18	
6	Técnico Universitario	18	7	4	7	22	24	−2	18	
7	Universidad Católica	18	7	4	7	19	21	−2	18	
8	9 de Octubre	18	5	4	9	20	23	−3	14	
9	LDU Quito	18	5	3	10	14	24	−10	13	
10	Everest	18	4	3	11	16	26	−10	11	

Source: RSSSF - 1982 Serie A

== Second stage ==
Pos	Team	Pld	W	D	L	GF	GA	GD	Pts	Qualification or relegation
1	Barcelona	22	11	7	4	24	14	+10	29	
2	9 de Octubre	22	11	5	6	41	28	+13	27	Qualified to the Liguilla Final
3	El Nacional	22	11	4	7	40	26	+14	26	
4	LDU Portoviejo	22	11	4	7	40	30	+10	26	
5	Universidad Católica	22	9	7	6	36	24	+12	25	
6	Deportivo Quevedo	22	7	9	6	34	33	+1	23	
7	Técnico Universitario	22	8	6	8	32	30	+2	22	
8	Emelec	22	9	4	9	30	30	0	22	
9	LDU Quito	22	7	7	8	32	31	+1	21	
10	Aucas	22	6	5	11	27	44	−17	17	
11	Deportivo Quito	22	4	8	10	19	35	−16	16	
12	Everest	22	3	4	15	21	50	−29	10	

Source: RSSSF - 1982 Serie A

== Liguilla Final ==
Pos	Team	Pld	W	D	L	GF	GA	GD	Pts	Qualification
1	El Nacional (Note: El Nacional was awarded two points.) (C)	6	3	1	2	13	8	+5	11	1983 Copa Libertadores
2	Barcelona (Note: Barcelona was awarded six points.)	6	3	1	2	8	11	−3	11	1983 Copa Libertadores
3	LDU Portoviejo (Note: LDU Portoviejo was awarded two points.)	6	3	0	3	10	9	+1	8	
4	9 de Octubre (Note: 9 de Octubre were awarded two points.)	6	2	0	4	7	10	−3	6	

Source: RSSSF - 1982 Serie A
(C) Champions

=== Tiebreaker ===
Barcelona	4–2	El Nacional

El Nacional	3–0	Barcelona

El Nacional	3–0	Barcelona

Campeonato Ecuatoriano de Fútbol
1982 champion
