= Pablo Ansaldo =

Ecuadorian footballer (1935-2016)

Personal information
- Full name: Pablo Mario Ansaldo Villacís
- Date of birth: 2 March 1935
- Place of birth: Guayaquil, Ecuador
- Date of death: 31 October 2016 (aged 81)
- Place of death: Guayaquil, Ecuador
- Height: 1.81 m (5 ft 11 in)

Senior career*
Years	Team	Apps	(Gls)
1954–1966	Barcelona SC		
1958	→ Emelec (loan)		
1966–1967	Manta		

International career
	Ecuador	23	(0)

Managerial career
- 1965–1966: Barcelona SC
- 1966–1967: Manta
- 1970: Once Caldas
- Atlético Bucaramanga
- 1973: Barcelona SC
- 1974: Barcelona SC
- 1985: Barcelona SC
- * Club domestic league appearances and goals

Pablo Mario Ansaldo Villacís (2 March 1935 – 31 October 2016) was an Ecuadorian footballer and manager.

== Club career ==
Born in Guayaquil, Ansaldo began his career with hometown club Barcelona SC, making his debut for the club on 23 June 1954 in a 2–0 win against Panamá. In 1958, Ansaldo played for rivals Emelec on an international tour. During Barcelona's victorious 1960 Campeonato Ecuatoriano de Fútbol campaign, Ansaldo became the first goalkeeper to save a penalty in Ecuadorian football since the establishment of a national league three years prior. In 1966, Ansaldo signed for Manta, playing for the club for a season before his retirement.

== International career ==
In total, Ansaldo represented Ecuador 23 times, including four times at the 1963 South American Championship.

On 15 August 1965, during qualification for the 1966 FIFA World Cup, Ansaldo suffered three broken ribs and a punctured lung, following a robust challenge from Chilean striker Carlos Campos, resulting in surgery and Ansaldo being sidelined for several months.

== Managerial career ==
In 1965, whilst still playing, Ansaldo took up the role of player-manager at Barcelona. In 1966, after moving to Manta, Ansaldo once again resumed the role of player-manager. Following his time managing in Ecuador, Ansaldo managed Colombian clubs Once Caldas and Atlético Bucaramanga. Ansaldo later returned to Barcelona as manager on a number of occasions.

== Style of play ==
Nicknamed el gato (the cat), due to his reflexes, Ansaldo's hardiness was praised by journalist Mauro Velásquez as being "brave to the point of being described as reckless and suicidal". Ansaldo's performance in a 1–0 win away to Colombia on 20 July 1965 won plaudits from the press at the time, with one newspaper reporting that Ansaldo was even capable of stopping the "Caribbean winds".

== Death ==
On 2 September 2016, Ansaldo suffered a stroke. Following 60 days in intensive care, Ansaldo died at a hospital in Guayaquil at the age of 81 on 31 October 2016.
