= 1961 Campeonato Ecuatoriano de Fútbol =

Season of the Ecuadorean Football League

Campeonato Ecuatoriano de Fútbol
- Season: 1961
- Champions: Emelec (2nd title)
- 1962 Copa Campeones: Emelec
- Top goalscorer: Galo Pinto (14 goals)
- Biggest home win: Everest 7–1 Macará
- Biggest away win: Deportivo Quito 3–5 Emelec
- Highest scoring: LDU Quito 5–4 Everest

The 1961 Campeonato Ecuatoriano de Fútbol (English: Ecuadorian Football Championship) was the 3rd national championship for football teams in Ecuador. Emelec won their second national title.

== Qualified teams ==
Competition	Team	Qualification method
Guayaquil; 4 berths	Barcelona	1961 Guayaquil champion
Guayaquil; 4 berths	Emelec	1961 Guayaquil runner-up
Guayaquil; 4 berths	Everest	1961 Guayaquil top-four finisher
Guayaquil; 4 berths	Patria	1961 Guayaquil top-four finisher
Interandino; 4 berths	LDU Quito	1961 Interandino champion
Interandino; 4 berths	España	1961 Interandino runner-up
Interandino; 4 berths	Deportivo Quito	1961 Interandino top-four finisher
Interandino; 4 berths	Macará	1961 Interandino top-four finisher

== Standings ==
Pos	Team	Pld	W	D	L	GF	GA	GD	Pts	Qualification or relegation
1	Emelec	8	3	4	1	15	12	+3	10	1962 Copa de Campeones
2	Patria	8	4	1	3	17	14	+3	9	
3	Everest	8	4	0	4	22	13	+9	8	
4	LDU Quito	8	4	0	4	15	11	+4	8	
5	Deportivo Quito	8	3	2	3	13	19	−6	8	
6	Barcelona	8	3	1	4	12	13	−1	7	
7	España	8	2	3	3	7	12	−5	7	
8	Macará	8	3	1	4	17	24	−7	7	

Source: :

Campeonato Ecuatoriano de Fútbol
1961 champion
Emelec
2nd title

== Results ==
Home \ Away (Note: Teams from the same association did not play each other.)	BAR	EME	EVE	PAT	QUI	ESP	LDQ	MAC
Barcelona					0–1	4–0	1–0	2–3
Emelec					3–3	1–1	1–0	4–4
Everest					6–1	2–1	2–1	7–1
Patria					1–1	4–0	2–1	3–1
Deportivo Quito	3–2	3–5	1–0	0–2 (Note: The match Deportivo Quito v. Everest originally ended 3–0. This placed Deportivo Quito tied in first place with Emelec; a championship playoff was needed. The championship playoff ended 3–2 in favor of Deportivo Quito. However, Everest filed a complaint with the National Sporting Federation of Ecuador claiming that Deportivo fielded an ineligible player. Everest won their complaint and the score of the Deportivo v. Everest match was changed to 0–2. Emelec were the champions.)				
España	0–0	0–0	1–0	4–1				
LDU Quito	4–0	1–0	5–4	3–1				
Macará	2–3	0–1	2–1	4–3				

Legend: Blue = home team win; Yellow = draw; Red = away team win.

== Top goalscorers ==
Pos	Name	Club	Goals
1	Galo Pinto	Everest	14
2	Hardany Rojas		9
3	Ernesto Guerra	Aucas	5
3	Hugo Mantilla	LDU Quito	5
3	Bolívar Mreizalde	Aucas	5
3	Carlos Alberto Raffo	Emelec	5
