= Ermen Benítez =

Ecuadorian footballer (born 1961)

Personal information
- Full name: Ermen de Jesús Benítez Mesías
- Date of birth: 4 May 1961 (age 65)
- Place of birth: Ecuador
- Position: Striker

Senior career*
Years	Team	Apps	(Gls)
1980–1990	El Nacional		(154)
1991–1992	Barcelona SC		(19)
1993	LDU Quito		(1)
1994	Green Cross		(12)
1995	LDU Portoviejo		(5)

International career
1984–1989	Ecuador	19	(8)
- * Club domestic league appearances and goals

Ermen de Jesús Benítez Mesías (born 4 May 1961) is an Ecuadorian former international footballer who played professionally as a striker.

He is the Serie A (Ecuador's top league) all-time topscorer, having scored 191 goals for five clubs in 16 years as a professional.

== Personal life ==
He is the father of the late Ecuadorian international Christian Benítez.
