= 1960 Campeonato Ecuatoriano de Fútbol =

Campeonato Ecuatoriano de Fútbol
- Season: 1960
- Champions: Barcelona (1st title)
- Copa Campeones: Barcelona
- Matches played: 32
- Goals scored: 124 (3.88 per match)
- Top goalscorer: Enrique Cantos (8 goals)
- Biggest home win: Emelec 5–1 Deportivo Quito; Barcelona 4–0 LDU Quito
- Biggest away win: Patria 3–5 Deportivo Quito; España 2–4 Barcelona
- Highest scoring: Patria 7–2 Macará

The 1960 Campeonato Ecuatoriano de Fútbol (English: Ecuadorian Football Championship) was the 2nd national championship for football teams in Ecuador. The tournament returned after a two-year hiatus using with the same format, but expanded the field of teams from four to eight.

A Guayaquil team won the national championship for a consecutive season. Barcelona won their first national title, which allowed them to participate in the 1961 Copa Campeones. They are the first Ecuadorian club to play in the continental tournament.

== Qualified teams ==
The number of teams for this season expanded from four to eight. The qualified teams were the top four teams from the Guayaquil and Interandino leagues.

Competition	Team	Qualification method
Guayaquil; 4 berths	Everest	1960 Guayaquil champion
Guayaquil; 4 berths	Emelec	1960 Guayaquil runner-up
Guayaquil; 4 berths	Barcelona	1960 Guayaquil top-four finisher
Guayaquil; 4 berths	Patria	1960 Guayaquil top-four finisher
Interandino; 4 berths	LDU Quito	1960 Interandino champion
Interandino; 4 berths	Deportivo Quito	1960 Interandino runner-up
Interandino; 4 berths	España	1960 Interandino top-four finisher
Interandino; 4 berths	Macará	1960 Interandino top-four finisher

== Standings ==
Pos	Team	Pld	W	D	L	GF	GA	GD	Pts	Qualification
1	Barcelona	8	6	1	1	16	4	+12	13	1961 Copa de Campeones
2	Emelec	8	5	1	2	23	17	+6	11	
3	Patria	8	4	2	2	19	14	+5	10	
4	Deportivo Quito	8	4	1	3	13	12	+1	9	
5	Everest	8	4	1	3	15	16	−1	9	
6	LDU Quito	8	1	3	4	10	15	−5	5	
7	Macará	8	2	0	6	16	26	−10	4	
8	España	8	1	1	6	12	20	−8	3	

== Results ==
Home \ Away (Note: Teams from the same association did not play each other.)	BAR	EME	EVE	PAT	QUI	ESP	LDQ	MAC
Barcelona					1–0	2–0	4–0	4–1
Emelec					5–1	4–2	3–1	3–2
Everest					1–0	2–1	2–1	3–4
Patria					3–5	2–1	2–2	7–2
Deportivo Quito	1–0	2–1	3–0	1–1				
España	2–4	2–2	2–3	2–1				
LDU Quito	0–0	4–1	2–2	0–1				
Macará	0–1	3–4	3–2	1–2				

Legend: Blue = home team win; Yellow = draw; Red = away team win.
Notes:

Campeonato Ecuatoriano de Fútbol
1960 champion
Barcelona
1st Title title
