= 1992 Campeonato Ecuatoriano de Fútbol Serie A =

Serie A
- Season: 1992
- Champions: El Nacional (10th title)
- Relegated: Universidad Católica; LDU Portoviejo
- Copa Libertadores: El Nacional; Barcelona
- Copa CONMEBOL: Emelec
- Matches: 242
- Goals: 626 (2.59 per match)

The 1992 Campeonato Ecuatoriano de Fútbol de la Serie A was the 34th season of the Serie A, the top level of professional football in Ecuador.

== Teams ==
The number of teams for this season was played by 12 teams.

(In First Stage)

| Club | City |
|---|---|
| Aucas | Quito |
| Barcelona | Guayaquil |
| Delfín | Manta |
| Deportivo Cuenca | Cuenca |
| Deportivo Quito | Quito |
| El Nacional | Quito |
| Emelec | Guayaquil |
| Green Cross | Manta |
| LDU Quito | Quito |
| Técnico Universitario | Ambato |
| Universidad Católica | Quito |
| Valdez | Guayaquil |

(In Second Stage)

| Club | City |
|---|---|
| Aucas | Quito |
| Barcelona | Guayaquil |
| Delfín | Manta |
| Deportivo Cuenca | Cuenca |
| Deportivo Quito | Quito |
| El Nacional | Quito |
| Emelec | Guayaquil |
| Green Cross | Manta |
| LDU Portoviejo | Portoviejo |
| LDU Quito | Quito |
| Técnico Universitario | Ambato |
| Valdez | Guayaquil |

== First stage ==
| Pos | Team | Pld | W | D | L | GF | GA | GD | Pts | Qualification or relegation |
|---|---|---|---|---|---|---|---|---|---|---|
| 1 | Emelec | 22 | 16 | 4 | 2 | 41 | 10 | +31 | 36 | Qualified to the Liguilla Final |
| 2 | El Nacional | 22 | 11 | 8 | 3 | 31 | 14 | +17 | 30 | Qualified to the Liguilla Final |
| 3 | Barcelona | 22 | 12 | 4 | 6 | 42 | 22 | +20 | 28 | |
| 4 | LDU Quito | 22 | 10 | 5 | 7 | 34 | 28 | +6 | 25 | |
| 5 | Deportivo Cuenca | 22 | 10 | 5 | 7 | 30 | 26 | +4 | 25 | |
| 6 | Valdez | 22 | 7 | 7 | 8 | 25 | 23 | +2 | 21 | |
| 7 | Deportivo Quito | 22 | 6 | 9 | 7 | 26 | 31 | −5 | 21 | |
| 8 | Aucas | 22 | 8 | 3 | 11 | 32 | 29 | +3 | 19 | |
| 9 | Green Cross | 22 | 8 | 3 | 11 | 31 | 43 | −12 | 19 | |
| 10 | Delfín | 22 | 3 | 8 | 11 | 20 | 42 | −22 | 14 | |
| 11 | Técnico Universitario | 22 | 3 | 7 | 12 | 10 | 31 | −21 | 13 | |
| 12 | Universidad Católica | 22 | 2 | 9 | 11 | 19 | 42 | −23 | 13 | Relegated to the Serie B |

Source: RSSSF
Rules for classification: 1) points; 2) goal difference; 3) number of goals scored.

== Second stage ==
=== Hexagonal 1 ===
| Pos | Team | Pld | W | D | L | GF | GA | GD | Pts | Qualification or relegation |
|---|---|---|---|---|---|---|---|---|---|---|
| 1 | Green Cross | 10 | 6 | 2 | 2 | 18 | 8 | +10 | 14 | Qualified to the Liguilla Final |
| 2 | Barcelona | 10 | 5 | 3 | 2 | 17 | 6 | +11 | 13 | Qualified to the Liguilla Final |
| 3 | Deportivo Quito | 10 | 6 | 1 | 3 | 14 | 12 | +2 | 13 | Qualified to the Liguilla Final |
| 4 | Emelec | 10 | 3 | 5 | 2 | 11 | 8 | +3 | 11 | |
| 5 | Técnico Universitario (O) | 10 | 1 | 3 | 6 | 4 | 16 | −12 | 5 | Definición del Descenso |
| 6 | Deportivo Cuenca | 10 | 1 | 2 | 7 | 8 | 22 | −14 | 4 | |

Source: RSSSF
Rules for classification: 1) points; 2) goal difference; 3) number of goals scored.
(O) Play-off winners

=== Hexagonal 2 ===
| Pos | Team | Pld | W | D | L | GF | GA | GD | Pts | Qualification or relegation |
|---|---|---|---|---|---|---|---|---|---|---|
| 1 | LDU Quito | 10 | 4 | 4 | 2 | 13 | 9 | +4 | 12 | Qualified to the Liguilla Final |
| 2 | El Nacional | 10 | 5 | 1 | 4 | 17 | 11 | +6 | 11 | |
| 3 | Valdez | 10 | 5 | 1 | 4 | 12 | 11 | +1 | 11 | |
| 4 | Delfín | 10 | 4 | 2 | 4 | 15 | 18 | −3 | 10 | |
| 5 | Aucas | 10 | 3 | 3 | 4 | 7 | 9 | −2 | 9 | |
| 6 | LDU Portoviejo (R) | 10 | 2 | 3 | 5 | 9 | 15 | −6 | 7 | Definición del Descenso |

Source: RSSSF
Rules for classification: 1) points; 2) goal difference; 3) number of goals scored.
(R) Relegated

== Definición del Descenso ==
27 September 1992

| Técnico Universitario | 3–2 | LDU Portoviejo |

3 October 1992

| LDU Portoviejo | 4–0 | Técnico Universitario |

As both won each match, a play-off match was played on a neutral court.

10 October 1992

| Técnico Universitario | 2–2 | LDU Portoviejo |
Penalties
| | 4–2 |

2–2 on aggregate in play-off match. Total aggregate both teams is 5–8. Técnico Universitario won 4–2 on penalties and stayed in 1993 Ecuadorian Serie A, while LDU Portoviejo were relegated to the 1993 Ecuadorian Serie B

== Liguilla Final ==
| Pos | Team | Pld | W | D | L | GF | GA | GD | Pts | Qualification or relegation |
|---|---|---|---|---|---|---|---|---|---|---|
| 1 | El Nacional (C) | 10 | 5 | 4 | 1 | 16 | 7 | +9 | 14 | Qualified for the Final and 1993 Copa Libertadores |
| 2 | Barcelona | 10 | 6 | 3 | 1 | 14 | 7 | +7 | 15 | Qualified for the Final and 1993 Copa Libertadores |
| 3 | Emelec | 10 | 5 | 2 | 3 | 21 | 10 | +11 | 12 | 1993 Copa CONMEBOL |
| 4 | Green Cross | 10 | 2 | 3 | 5 | 8 | 15 | −7 | 7 | |
| 5 | LDU Quito | 10 | 2 | 2 | 6 | 7 | 16 | −9 | 6 | |
| 6 | Deportivo Quito | 10 | 2 | 2 | 6 | 10 | 21 | −11 | 6 | |

Source: RSSSF - 1992 Serie A
(C) Champions

== Final ==
22 November 1992

| El Nacional | 2–1 | Barcelona |

25 November 1992

| Barcelona | 1–1 | El Nacional |

Campeonato Ecuatoriano de Fútbol
1992 champion
