= Ecuadorian football league system =

The Ecuadorian football league system is a series of interconnected football leagues for clubs in Ecuador, and is governed by the Federación Ecuatoriana de Fútbol at the national level.

== Structure ==
The Ecuadorian league system consists of two categories, with the top category divided into two series. At the top of the pyramid is Primera Categoría, Serie A (shorten to Primera A), which consists of the top teams of the country. Below them is Primera Categoría, Serie B (shorten to Primera B). Teams in the Primera Categoria play independent of the 18 provincial organizations that make up the Segunda Categoria, and independently of each other. The Segunda Categoria is the next level below the Primera Categoria. This is by far the largest level in the league system in terms of number of teams. Teams in this category play within their provincial associations to qualify to a larger national tournament.

=== Promotion & relegation ===
After the tournaments finish at the end of the calendar year, teams are relegated or promoted to different levels. The bottom two teams in Primera A are relegated to Primera B. Conversely, the top two teams of Primera B are promoted to Primera A, while the bottom two teams are relegated to Segunda. The top two teams in Segunda are promoted to Primera B.

== Current system ==
Level	League(s)/Division(s)
1	Liga PRO Ecuador Banco Pichincha (Serie A); 16 clubs
	↓↑ 2 clubs
2	Liga PRO Ecuador Banco Pichincha (Serie B); 10 clubs
	↓↑ 2 clubs
3	Segunda Categoría; 22 Champions and 42 Runners-up of regional leagues

== See also ==
- Ecuadorian Football Federation
- List of football clubs in Ecuador
