= 1957 Campeonato Ecuatoriano de Fútbol =

Annual soccer tournament

Campeonato Ecuatoriano de Fútbol
- Season: 1957
- Champions: Emelec (1st title)
- Matches: 8
- Goals: 28 (3.5 per match)
- Top goalscorer: Simón Cañarte (4 goals)
- Biggest home win: Barcelona 4–1 Aucas (November 24)
- Biggest away win: Aucas 3–4 Emelec (November 17)
- Highest scoring: Aucas 3–4 Emelec (November 17)
- Longest winning run: Emelec — 2 matches (November 10–November 17)
- Longest unbeaten run: Barcelona — 3 matches (November 17–December 1)
- Longest losing run: Aucas — 3 matches (November 10–Nov 24)

The 1957 Campeonato Ecuatoriano de Fútbol was the first time a football tournament was held to determine a national champion in Ecuador. Prior to this tournament, teams competed exclusively in one of two regional leagues, the Campeonato Profesional Interandinos (for clubs in Quito and Ambato) and the Campeonato Profesional de Fútbol de Guayaquil (for clubs in Guayaquil). Emelec from Guayaquil won the tournament and became the first Ecuadorian football champion.

== Qualified teams ==
Competition	Team	Qualification method
Guayaquil; 2 berths	Barcelona	1957 Guayaquil champion
Guayaquil; 2 berths	Emelec	1957 Guayaquil runner-up
Interandino; 2 berths	Deportivo Quito	1957 Interandino champion
Interandino; 2 berths	Aucas	1957 Interandino runner-up

== Standings ==
Pos	Team	Pld	W	D	L	GF	GA	GD	Pts
1	Emelec	4	3	0	1	8	4	+4	6
2	Barcelona	4	2	1	1	10	6	+4	5
3	Deportivo Quito	4	2	0	2	4	6	−2	4
4	Aucas	4	0	1	3	6	12	−6	1

== Results ==
Home \ Away (Note: Teams from the same association did not play each other.)	BAR	EME	AUC	QUI
Barcelona			4–1	3–1
Emelec			2–0	2–0
Aucas	2–2	3–4		
Deportivo Quito	2–1	1–0		

Legend: Blue = home team win; Yellow = draw; Red = away team win.
