= 2005 Campeonato Ecuatoriano de Fútbol Serie A =

Copa Pílsener Serie A
- Season: 2005
- Champions: Apertura: LDU Quito (8th title); Clausura: El Nacional (12th title)
- Relegated: Apertura: Deportivo Quevedo; Clausura: LDU Loja
- Copa Libertadores: LDU Quito; El Nacional; Deportivo Cuenca
- Copa Sudamericana: LDU Quito; El Nacional
- Top goalscorer: Apertura: Wilson Segura (21 goals); Clausura: Omar Guerra (17 goals); Season: Wilson Segura (28 goals)

The 2005 Campeonato Ecuatoriano de Fútbol de la Serie A 2005, known as 2005 Copa Pílsener Serie A for sponsorship reasons, was the 48th season of the Serie A, the top level of professional football in Ecuador. The season was divided into two tournaments, called the Apertura and Clausura, with the winner of each earning separate national titles. To date, it marks the only time in Serie A history that two titles were awarded in one year.

== Campeonato Apertura ==
The Apertura tournament was set into two stages. The First Stage was a double round-robin tournament where each team plays the other nine teams twice, once at home and once away. The top eight teams advanced to a two-leg single elimination knockout stage. The last team in the First Stage was relegated to Serie B. The winner of the knockout stage is the Apertura champion, and qualifies as the Ecuador 1 berth in the 2006 Copa Libertadores.

=== First stage ===
| Pos | Team | Pld | W | D | L | GF | GA | GD | Pts | Qualification or relegation |
|---|---|---|---|---|---|---|---|---|---|---|
| 1 | LDU Quito | 18 | 13 | 2 | 3 | 48 | 22 | +26 | 41 | 2005 Copa Sudamericana First Stage & Playoffs |
| 2 | El Nacional | 18 | 9 | 6 | 3 | 41 | 27 | +14 | 33 | 2005 Copa Sudamericana First Stage & Playoffs |
| 3 | Barcelona | 18 | 7 | 5 | 6 | 19 | 31 | −12 | 26 | Qualified to the Playoffs |
| 4 | Deportivo Cuenca | 18 | 7 | 4 | 7 | 26 | 28 | −2 | 25 | Qualified to the Playoffs |
| 5 | LDU Loja | 18 | 7 | 4 | 7 | 35 | 38 | −3 | 25 | Qualified to the Playoffs |
| 6 | Deportivo Quito | 18 | 7 | 3 | 8 | 36 | 23 | +13 | 24 | Qualified to the Playoffs |
| 7 | Aucas | 18 | 7 | 3 | 8 | 22 | 27 | −5 | 24 | Qualified to the Playoffs |
| 8 | Olmedo | 18 | 6 | 5 | 7 | 22 | 25 | −3 | 23 | Qualified to the Playoffs |
| 9 | Emelec | 18 | 5 | 5 | 8 | 24 | 31 | −7 | 20 | |
| 10 | Deportivo Quevedo | 18 | 2 | 3 | 13 | 22 | 43 | −21 | 9 | Relegation to Serie B |

Updated to match(es) played on July 2, 2005. Source: RSSSF
Rules for classification: 1) points; 2) goal difference; 3) number of goals scored.

=== Playoff stage ===
Quarterfinals
1 | LDU Quito | 1 | 5 | 6
8 | Olmedo | 1 | 1 | 2
4 | Deportivo Cuenca* | 1 | 3 | 4
5 | LDU Loja | 1 | 3 | 4
3 | Barcelona* | 0 | 2 | 2
6 | Deportivo Quito | 2 | 0 | 2
2 | El Nacional | 0 | 4 | 4
7 | Aucas | 0 | 0 | 0

Semifinals
1 | LDU Quito | 1 | 3 | 4
4 | Deportivo Cuenca | 2 | 1 | 3
3 | Barcelona | 1 | 2 | 3
2 | El Nacional | 1 | 1 | 2

Finals
1 | LDU Quito | 0 | 3 | 3
3 | Barcelona | 1 | 0 | 1

(*) Barcelona and D. Cuenca advance because of better First Stage records.

Copa Pílsener Serie A
2005 Apertura champion
LDU Quito
8th title

== Campeonato Clausura ==
The Clausura tournament was set into two stages. The First Stage was a double round-robin tournament where each team played the other nine teams twice, once at home and once away. The top six teams in the First Stage advanced to the Liguilla Final, with the top three earning bonus points (3, 2, and 1 point respectively). The last team in the First Stage was relegated to Serie B. The winner of the Liguilla Final was the Clausura champion. The champion and runner-up qualified as the Ecuador 2 and Ecuador 3 berth in the 2006 Copa Libertadores. ESPOLI was promoted to Serie A at the end of Serie B's 2005 Apertura tournament.

=== First stage ===
| Pos | Team | Pld | W | D | L | GF | GA | GD | Pts | Qualification or relegation |
|---|---|---|---|---|---|---|---|---|---|---|
| 1 | El Nacional | 18 | 9 | 4 | 5 | 42 | 27 | +15 | 31 | Qualified to the Liguilla Final |
| 2 | Aucas | 18 | 9 | 2 | 7 | 28 | 21 | +7 | 29 | Qualified to the Liguilla Final |
| 3 | Olmedo | 18 | 7 | 6 | 5 | 25 | 23 | +2 | 27 | Qualified to the Liguilla Final |
| 4 | Deportivo Cuenca | 18 | 6 | 9 | 3 | 19 | 19 | 0 | 27 | Qualified to the Liguilla Final |
| 5 | LDU Quito | 18 | 7 | 5 | 6 | 25 | 20 | +5 | 26 | Qualified to the Liguilla Final |
| 6 | Barcelona | 18 | 7 | 5 | 6 | 26 | 25 | +1 | 26 | Qualified to the Liguilla Final |
| 7 | ESPOLI | 18 | 7 | 2 | 9 | 29 | 31 | −2 | 23 | |
| 8 | Deportivo Quito | 18 | 5 | 8 | 5 | 21 | 27 | −6 | 23 | |
| 9 | Emelec | 18 | 5 | 6 | 7 | 20 | 25 | −5 | 21 | |
| 10 | LDU Loja | 18 | 2 | 5 | 11 | 22 | 39 | −17 | 11 | Relegation to Serie B |

Source: RSSSF
Rules for classification: 1) points; 2) goal difference; 3) number of goals scored.

=== Liguilla Final ===
| Pos | Team | Pld | W | D | L | GF | GA | GD | BP | Pts | Qualification |
|---|---|---|---|---|---|---|---|---|---|---|---|
| 1 | El Nacional | 10 | 7 | 1 | 2 | 23 | 9 | +14 | 3 | 25 | 2006 Copa Libertadores Second Stage |
| 2 | Deportivo Cuenca | 10 | 6 | 2 | 2 | 12 | 10 | +2 | 0 | 20 | 2006 Copa Libertadores First Stage |
| 3 | LDU Quito | 10 | 5 | 2 | 3 | 20 | 13 | +7 | 0 | 17 | |
| 4 | Aucas | 10 | 3 | 1 | 6 | 17 | 24 | −7 | 2 | 12 | |
| 5 | Olmedo | 10 | 2 | 2 | 6 | 7 | 15 | −8 | 1 | 9 | |
| 6 | Barcelona | 10 | 2 | 2 | 6 | 6 | 14 | −8 | 0 | 8 | |

Source: RSSSF
Rules for classification: 1) points; 2) goal difference; 3) number of goals scored. Included Bonus Points earned in the First Stage.

Copa Pílsener Serie A
2005 Clausura champion
El Nacional
12th title

== See also ==
- 2005 in Ecuadorian football
