= 1996 Campeonato Ecuatoriano de Fútbol Serie A =

Serie A
- Season: 1996
- Champions: El Nacional (11th title)
- Relegated: Green Cross; LDU Portoviejo
- Copa Libertadores: El Nacional; Emelec
- Copa CONMEBOL: Técnico Universitario
- Matches played: 228
- Goals scored: 608 (2.67 per match)
- Top goalscorer: Ariel Graziani (29 goals)

The 1996 Campeonato Ecuatoriano de Fútbol de la Serie A was the 38th season of the Serie A, the top level of professional football in Ecuador. El Nacional won their eleventh national championship.
