= Club Deportivo Juventus =

Ecuadorian football club

Juventus de Esmeraldas
- Full name: Club Social y Deportivo Juventus
- Nicknames: La Juve Esmeraldeña, Los Juventinos, Los Funebreros, La Alegría del Pueblo, La Vieja Señora Esmeraldeña, La Novia de Esmeraldas, Los Blanquinegros, Las Cebras, [La] Señora Homicidios
- Founded: January 21, 1979; 46 years ago
- Dissolved: 2012
- Ground: Estadio Folke Anderson
- Capacity: 14,000
- Chairman: Ramón Echeverría
- League: Segunda Categoría
- 2011: Segunda Categoría, ?
Home colours	Away colours

Club Social y Deportivo Juventus is a professional football club based in Esmeraldas, Ecuador.

== Achievements ==
- Serie B (1): 1989 E2
- Segunda Categoría (1): 1987
