= LigaPro Serie A =

Ecuadorian association football league

Liga Pro Ecuador Serie A
- Founded: 1957; 69 years ago
- Country: Ecuador
- Confederation: CONMEBOL
- Number of clubs: 16
- Level on pyramid: 1
- Relegation to: Serie B
- Domestic cup(s): Copa Ecuador; Supercopa Ecuador
- International cup(s): Copa Libertadores; Copa Sudamericana
- Current champions: Independiente del Valle (3rd title)
- Most championships: Barcelona (16 titles)
- Most appearances: Carlos Javier Caicedo (670)
- Top scorer: Ermen Benítez (191)
- Website: www.ligapro.ec
- Current: 2026 Serie A season

The Liga Pro Ecuador Serie A, simply known as the Liga Pro or the Serie A (or the Ecuadorian Serie A to distinguish it from Italy's Serie A and Brazil's Série A), or as Liga Pro Ecuabet for sponsorship reasons, is a professional association football league in Ecuador and the highest level of the Ecuadorian football league system. Contested by 16 clubs, it operates a system of promotion and relegation with the Serie B, the lower level of the Primera Categoría. The season runs from February to December and is usually contested in multiple stages.

While initially not a league, the Serie A has its roots in the national championship between the top teams of Ecuador's two regional leagues. For the first nine editions, teams from Guayaquil and Quito qualified to the competition through their professional regional leagues. It abandoned the qualification format to form a proper league in 1967. Since the first edition in 1957, the tournament has been held annually (except 1958 and 1959); the 2005 season had two champions. It was ranked by IFFHS as the 11th strongest football league in the world for 2022, and the 4th strongest league in South America.

Eleven clubs have been crowned Ecuadorian champions, but four teams have a combined total of 55 championships. The most successful club is Barcelona with sixteen titles. Independiente del Valle are the defending champions.

== Format ==
The format for the Serie A national championship changes consistently. The most common format is a two-stage tournament, in which teams qualify to a mini-league (Spanish: Liguilla) to determine the champion. The current format was introduced for the 2010 season and consists of three stages. The First and Second Stages each follow the double round-robin format. The winners of each stage play against each other in the Third Stage for the championship. A third-place match also takes place in the Third Stage between the next two-best teams in the aggregate table. If the same team wins both the First and Second Stage, they are automatically the champion. In this case, the second and third best teams in the aggregate table play against each other for runner-up.

Relegation takes place after the Second Stage and is determined using an aggregate table of the first two stages. As well as playing to win the championship and avoid relegation teams also compete for places in the following season's Copa Libertadores and Copa Sudamericana.

== History ==
All football in Ecuador was played at amateur level until 1950 when the Guayas Football Association (Spanish: Asociación de Fútbol del Guayas [AFG]) turned professional and held its first professional tournament for affiliated clubs (for clubs in Guayaquil). The Professional Football Championship of Guayaquil (Spanish: Campeonato Professional de Fútbol de Guayaquil) was first held in 1951 and was won by Río Guayas. In 1954, the football association in Pichincha (current the Asociación de Fútbol No Amatur de Pichincha [AFNA]) decided to turn professional and hold a professional tournament of their own for their affiliated clubs (for clubs in Quito and Ambato). The first Inter-Andean Professional Championship (Spanish: Campeonato Professional Interandino) was held in 1954 and was won by LDU Quito.

The two tournaments were the top-level football leagues in Ecuador, but the champion of each could not claim to be the national champion. That changed in 1957 when a national football tournament was organized for the winners the two leagues. The first Ecuadorian Football Championship was contested between the champion and runner-up of the 1957 Campeonato Professional de Fútbol de Guayaquil of (Emelec and Barcelona, respectively) and the champion and runner-up of the 1957 Campeonato Professional Interandino (Deportivo Quito and Aucas, respectively). Emelec won the tournament and became the first national champions of football in Ecuador.

No championship was held in 1958 and 1959. The tournament returned in 1960 using the same format as in 1957. This time the field grew from four teams to eight teams. This format continued until 1967 when a number of changes occurred: 1) the regional tournaments were discontinued after the 1967 season; 2) teams contesting the national championship from 1968 onwards were now part of the Primera Categoría; and 3) a second level of Ecuadorian football (Segunda Categoría) was put into play and a system of relegation and promotion began in 1967.

In 1971, the Primera Categoría was divided into two Series: Serie A & Serie B. Serie A was to be the top level of club football, while Serie B was the second, and Segunda the third. Between, 1983–1988, Serie B was merged into the Segunda, but the Serie A continued. Serie B was brought back in 1989, and has stayed as the second level since.

In 2005, the Campeonato Ecuatoriano was divided into two tournaments to crown two champions in one year. The two tournaments were called Apertura and Clausura. The tournament returned to its year-long format in 2006.

== Clubs ==
A total of 55 clubs have competed in the Serie A since the first season in 1957. Although Barcelona is the only club to have never been relegated, no club has ever played in every season. This anomaly is due to the fact that for the 1964 competition, teams from Guayaquil (including Barcelona and Emelec) declined to participate in the national championship.

The following sixteen clubs will compete in the Serie A during the 2026 season.

Locations of the 2026 Serie A clubs.

Team	City	Stadium	Capacity
Aucas	Quito	Cooprogreso Gonzalo Pozo Ripalda	21,689
Barcelona	Guayaquil	Monumental Banco Pichincha	57,267
Delfín	Manta	Jocay	21,000
Deportivo Cuenca	Cuenca	Banco del Austro Alejandro Serrano Aguilar	18,549
Emelec	Guayaquil	George Capwell Banco del Austro	40,020
Guayaquil City	Guayaquil	Christian Benítez	10,152
Independiente del Valle	Quito	Banco Guayaquil	12,000
LDU Quito	Quito	Rodrigo Paz Delgado	41,575
Leones	Atuntaqui	Olímpico Jaime Terán	10,000
Libertad	Loja	Reina del Cisne	14,935
Macará	Ambato	Bellavista Universidad Indoamérica	16,467
Manta	Manta	Jocay	21,000
Mushuc Runa	Ambato	COAC Mushuc Runa	8,200
Orense	Machala	Banco de Machala 9 de Mayo	16,456
Técnico Universitario	Ambato	Bellavista Universidad Indoamérica	16,467
Universidad Católica	Quito	Olímpico Atahualpa	35,258

== Champions by year ==
Barcelona has won 16 championships, followed by Emelec with 14 titles, El Nacional and LDU Quito with 13 titles, Deportivo Quito with 5 titles, Independiente del Valle with 2 titles, and Deportivo Cuenca, Olmedo, Delfin, Everest, and Aucas with one title each. All the clubs that have won over 2 championships have won back-to-back titles at least once. El Nacional and Emelec are the only two clubs to have won three titles in a row, El Nacional has done twice from 1976–1978 and 1982–1984, and C.S. Emelec from 2013–2015.

- (In bracket, title count):

Ed.	Season		Champion (Title count)	Runner-up	Third place	Leading goalscorer(s)
1	1957		Emelec (1)	Barcelona	Deportivo Quito	(Ecuador) Simón Cañarte (Barcelona; 4 goals)
–	1958–1959		No championship held			
2	1960		Barcelona (1)	Emelec	Patria	(Ecuador) Enrique Cantos (Barcelona; 8 goals)
3	1961		Emelec (2)	Patria	Everest	(Ecuador) Galo Pinto (Everest; 12 goals)
4	1962		Everest (1)	Barcelona	Emelec	(Brazil) Iris López (Barcelona; 9 goals)
5	1963		Barcelona (2)	Emelec	Deportivo Quito	(Ecuador) Carlos Alberto Raffo (Emelec; 4 goals)
6	1964		Deportivo Quito (1)	El Nacional	LDU Quito	(Ecuador) Jorge Valencia (América (M); 8 goals)
7	1965		Emelec (3)	9 de Octubre	Barcelona	(Brazil) Helio Cruz (Barcelona; 8 goals)
8	1966		Barcelona (3)	Emelec	Politécnico	(Brazil) Pio Coutinho (LDU Quito; 13 goals)
9	1967		El Nacional (1)	Emelec	Barcelona	(Ecuador) Tom Rodríguez (El Nacional; 16 goals)
10	1968		Deportivo Quito (2)	Barcelona	Emelec	(Uruguay) Víctor Battaini (Deportivo Quito; 19 goals)
11	1969		LDU Quito (1)	América de Quito	Aucas	(Uruguay) Francisco Bertocchi (LDU Quito; 26 goals)
12	1970		Barcelona (4)	Emelec	América de Quito	(Ecuador) Rómulo Dudar Mina (Macará; 19 goals)
13	1971		Barcelona (5)	América de Quito	Emelec	(Paraguay) Alfonso Obregón (LDU Portoviejo; 18 goals)
14	1972		Emelec (4)	El Nacional	Barcelona	(Brazil) Nelsinho (Barcelona; 24 goals)
15	1973		El Nacional (2)	Universidad Católica	Barcelona	(Uruguay) Ángel Marín (América (Q); 18 goals)
16	1974		LDU Quito (2)	El Nacional	Deportivo Cuenca	(Argentina) Ángel Liciardi (Deportivo Cuenca; 19 goals)
17	1975		LDU Quito (3)	Deportivo Cuenca	Aucas	(Argentina) Ángel Liciardi (Deportivo Cuenca; 36 goals)
18	1976		El Nacional (3)	Deportivo Cuenca	Emelec	(Argentina) Ángel Liciardi (Deportivo Cuenca; 19 goals)
19	1977		El Nacional (4)	LDU Quito	Universidad Católica	(Ecuador) Fabián Paz y Miño (El Nacional; 27 goals)
20	1978		El Nacional (5)	Técnico Universitario	Emelec	(Argentina) Juan José Pérez (LDU Portoviejo; 24 goals)
21	1979		Emelec (5)	Universidad Católica	Manta Sport	(Argentina) Carlos Miori (Emelec; 26 goals)
22	1980		Barcelona (6)	Técnico Universitario	Universidad Católica	(Argentina) Miguel Gutíerrez (América (Q); 26 goals)
23	1981		Barcelona (7)	LDU Quito	El Nacional	(Brazil) Paulo César (LDU Quito; 25 goals)
24	1982		El Nacional (6)	Barcelona	LDU Portoviejo	(Ecuador) José Villafuerte (El Nacional; 25 goals)
25	1983		El Nacional (7)	9 de Octubre	Barcelona	(Brazil) Paulo César (Barcelona; 28 goals)
26	1984		El Nacional (8)	9 de Octubre	LDU Quito	(Ecuador) Sergio Saucedo (Deportivo Quito; 25 goals)
27	1985		Barcelona (8)	Deportivo Quito	Filanbanco	(Uruguay) Juan Carlos de Lima (Universidad Católica; 24 goals) (Brazil) Guga (Esmeraldas Petrolero; 24 goals)
28	1986		El Nacional (9)	Barcelona	Técnico Universitario	(Uruguay) Juan Carlos de Lima (Deportivo Quito; 23 goals)
29	1987		Barcelona (9)	Filanbanco	Audaz Octubrino	(Ecuador) Ermen Benitez (El Nacional; 24 goals) (Ecuador) Hamilton Cuvi (Filanbanco; 24 goals) (Uruguay) Waldemar Victorino (LDU Portoviejo; 24 goals)
30	1988		Emelec (6)	Deportivo Quito	LDU Quito	(Brazil) Janio Pinto (LDU Quito; 18 goals)
31	1989		Barcelona (10)	Emelec	Deportivo Quito	(Ecuador) Ermen Benítez (El Nacional; 18 goals)
32	1990		LDU Quito (4)	Barcelona	Emelec	(Ecuador) Ermen Benítez (El Nacional; 33 goals)
33	1991		Barcelona (11)	Valdez	El Nacional	(Uruguay) Pedro Varela (Delfín; 24 goals)
34	1992		El Nacional (10)	Barcelona	Emelec	(Ecuador) Carlos Muñoz (Barcelona; 19 goals)
35	1993		Emelec (7)	Barcelona	El Nacional	(Ecuador) Diego Herrera (LDU Quito; 21 goals)
36	1994		Emelec (8)	El Nacional	Barcelona	(Ecuador) Manuel Uquillas (ESPOLI; 25 goals)
37	1995		Barcelona (12)	ESPOLI	El Nacional	(Ecuador) Manuel Uquillas (Barcelona; 24 goals)
38	1996		El Nacional (11)	Emelec	Barcelona	(Ecuador) Ariel Graziani (Emelec; 28 goals)
39	1997		Barcelona (13)	Deportivo Quito	Emelec	(Ecuador) Ariel Graziani (Emelec; 24 goals)
40	1998		LDU Quito (5)	Emelec	Aucas	(Ecuador) Iván Kaviedes (Emelec; 43 goals)
41	1999		LDU Quito (6)	El Nacional	Emelec	(Argentina) Christian Botero (Macará; 25 goals)
42	2000		Olmedo (1)	El Nacional	Emelec	(Argentina) Alejandro Kenig (Emelec; 25 goals)
43	2001		Emelec (9)	El Nacional	Olmedo	(Ecuador) Carlos Juárez (Emelec; 17 goals)
44	2002		Emelec (10)	Barcelona	El Nacional	(Argentina) Christian Carnero (Deportivo Quito; 26 goals)
45	2003		LDU Quito (7)	Barcelona	El Nacional	(Ecuador) Ariel Graziani (Barcelona; 23 goals)
46	2004		Deportivo Cuenca (1)	Olmedo	LDU Quito	(Ecuador) Ebelio Ordóñez (El Nacional; 24 goals)
47	2005	Apertura	LDU Quito (8)	Barcelona	El Nacional	(Colombia) Wilson Segura (LDU Loja; 21 goals)
48	2005	Clausura	El Nacional (12)	Deportivo Cuenca	LDU Quito	(Colombia) Omar Guerra (Aucas; 21 goals)
49	2006		El Nacional (13)	Emelec	LDU Quito	(Argentina) Luis Miguel Escalada (Emelec; 29 goals)
50	2007		LDU Quito (9)	Deportivo Cuenca	Olmedo	(Argentina) Juan Carlos Ferreyra (Deportivo Cuenca; 17 goals)
51	2008		Deportivo Quito (3)	LDU Quito	Deportivo Cuenca	(Ecuador) Pablo Palacios (Barcelona; 20 goals)
52	2009		Deportivo Quito (4)	Deportivo Cuenca	Emelec	(Argentina) Claudio Bieler (LDU Quito; 22 goals)
53	2010		LDU Quito (10)	Emelec	Deportivo Quito	(Ecuador) Jaime Ayoví (Emelec; 23 goals)
54	2011		Deportivo Quito (5)	Emelec	El Nacional	(Ecuador) Narciso Mina (Independiente José Terán; 28 goals)
55	2012		Barcelona (14)	Emelec	LDU Quito	(Ecuador) Narciso Mina (Barcelona; 30 goals)
56	2013		Emelec (11)	Independiente del Valle	Deportivo Quito	(Argentina) Federico Nieto (Deportivo Quito; 29 goals)
57	2014		Emelec (12)	Barcelona	Independiente del Valle	(Ecuador) Armando Wila (Universidad Católica; 20 goals)
58	2015		Emelec (13)	LDU Quito	Independiente del Valle	(Ecuador) Miller Bolaños (Emelec; 25 goals)
59	2016		Barcelona (15)	Emelec	El Nacional	(Argentina) Maximiliano Barreiro (Delfín; 26 goals)
60	2017		Emelec (14)	Delfín	Independiente del Valle	(Argentina) Hernán Barcos (LDU Quito; 21 goals)
61	2018		LDU Quito (11)	Emelec	Barcelona	(Ecuador) Jhon Cifuente (Universidad Católica; 37 goals)
62	2019		Delfín (1)	LDU Quito	Macará	(Paraguay) Luis Amarilla (Universidad Católica; 19 goals)
63	2020		Barcelona (16)	LDU Quito	Independiente del Valle	(Colombia) Cristian Martínez Borja (LDU Quito; 24 goals)
64	2021		Independiente del Valle (1)	Emelec	Universidad Católica	(Argentina) Jonatan Bauman (Mushuc Runa/Independiente del Valle; 26 goals)
65	2022		Aucas (1)	Barcelona	Universidad Católica	(Argentina) Francisco Fydriszewski (Aucas; 15 goals)
66	2023		LDU Quito (12)	Independiente del Valle	Barcelona	(Ecuador) Miguel Parrales (Guayaquil City; 16 goals)
67	2024		LDU Quito (13)	Independiente del Valle	Barcelona	(Paraguay) Álex Arce (LDU Quito; 28 goals)
68	2025		Independiente del Valle (2)	LDU Quito	Barcelona	(Ecuador) Jorge Daniel Valencia (Manta; 21 goals)
69	2026		Independiente del Valle (3)	Macará		

== Titles by club ==
- Teams in **bold** compete in the Serie A as of the 2026 season.
- Italics indicates clubs that no longer exist or disaffiliated from the FEF.

Rank	Club	Winners	Runners-up	Winning years	Runners-up years
1	**Barcelona**	16	13	1960, 1963, 1966, 1970, 1971, 1980, 1981, 1985, 1987, 1989, 1991, 1995, 1997, 2012, 2016, 2020	1957, 1962, 1968, 1982, 1986, 1990, 1992, 1993, 2002, 2003, 2005 Apertura, 2014, 2022
2	**Emelec**	14	15	1957, 1961, 1965, 1972, 1979, 1988, 1993, 1994, 2001, 2002, 2013, 2014, 2015, 2017	1960, 1963, 1966, 1967, 1970, 1989, 1996, 1998, 2006, 2010, 2011, 2012, 2016, 2018, 2021
3	El Nacional	13	7	1967, 1973, 1976, 1977, 1978, 1982, 1983, 1984, 1986, 1992, 1996, 2005 Clausura, 2006	1964, 1972, 1974, 1994, 1999, 2000, 2001
3	**LDU Quito**	13	7	1969, 1974, 1975, 1990, 1998, 1999, 2003, 2005 Apertura, 2007, 2010, 2018, 2023, 2024	1977, 1981, 2008, 2015, 2019, 2020, 2025
5	Deportivo Quito	5	3	1964, 1968, 2008, 2009, 2011	1985, 1988, 1997
6	**Independiente del Valle**	3	3	2021, 2025, 2026	2013, 2023, 2024
7	**Deportivo Cuenca**	1	5	2004	1975, 1976, 2005 Clausura, 2007, 2009
7	Olmedo	1	1	2000	2004
7	**Delfín**	1	1	2019	2017
7	Everest	1	—	1962	—
7	**Aucas**	1	—	2022	—

=== Titles by Province ===
Province	Nº of titles	Clubs
Pichincha	35	El Nacional (13), LDU Quito (13), Deportivo Quito (5), Independiente del Valle (3), Aucas (1)
Guayas	31	Barcelona (16), Emelec (14), Everest (1)
Azuay	1	Deportivo Cuenca (1)
Manabi	1	Delfín (1)
Chimborazo	1	Olmedo (1)

== All-time top goalscorers ==
Ecuadorian Ermen Benítez is the league's all-time top-scorer, having scored 191 goals over 15 season. He is also holds the record for scoring the most goals for one team.

Rank	Player	Club(s)	Years	Goals	Total goals
1	(Ecuador) Ermen Benítez	El Nacional	1980–90	154	191
1	(Ecuador) Ermen Benítez	Barcelona	1991–92	19	191
1	(Ecuador) Ermen Benítez	LDU Quito	1993	1	191
1	(Ecuador) Ermen Benítez	Green Cross	1994	12	191
1	(Ecuador) Ermen Benítez	LDU Portoviejo	1995	5	191
2	(Ecuador) Jorge Ron	El Nacional	1972–79	94	181
2	(Ecuador) Jorge Ron	Universidad Católica	1980–84	73	181
2	(Ecuador) Jorge Ron	Macará	1986	6	181
2	(Ecuador) Jorge Ron	Aucas	1987	8	181
3	(Ecuador) Ebelio Ordóñez	Técnico Universitario	1996	13	159
3	(Ecuador) Ebelio Ordóñez	El Nacional	1997–2004; 2006–07	137	159
3	(Ecuador) Ebelio Ordóñez	Emelec	2005	0	159
3	(Ecuador) Ebelio Ordóñez	Deportivo Quito	2008; 2010	9	159
4	(Argentina) Ángel Liciardi	Emelec	1970–71	8	154
4	(Argentina) Ángel Liciardi	Deportivo Cuenca	1972; 1974–77	132	154
4	(Argentina) Ángel Liciardi	Barcelona	1978	14	154
5	(Ecuador) Fabián Paz y Miño	El Nacional	1972–88	153	153

== See also ==
- Ecuadorian Football Federation
- Ecuadorian football league system
- Football in Ecuador
- List of football clubs in Ecuador
