= Club Sport Patria =

Ecuadorian football club

Patria
- Full name: Club Sport Patria
- Nicknames: "Decano del Fútbol Nacional", "El Equipo Patricio", "Los Patricios"
- Founded: September 18, 1908; 117 years ago
- Ground: Estadio Samborondón Arena, Samborondón, Ecuador
- Capacity: 2.200
- Chairman: Carlos Xavier Andrade
- Coach: Francesco Landucci
- League: Segunda Categoría
- 2018: Segunda Categoría/A, 4th
Home colours	Away colours

Club Sport Patria is a football club based in Guayaquil, Ecuador. Patria was one of the first football clubs founded in Ecuador and right now it is the oldest team in existence in the country.

== History ==
The birth of Patria goes back to the year 1906 when a group of young men from the Atarazana neighborhood in Guayaquil got together and decided to create a sports club. They initially called their group simply as "Guayaquil". Two years later they got together once again, but this time they decided to make their club official and that is how the Club Sport Patria was born on September 18, 1908.

Mr. Agustín Febres-Cordero Tyler one of the club's original founders declared that the first fields where the team ever played were the streets of Guayaquil, some of them now very important streets in the city like the 9 de Octubre Avenue now one of the busiest streets in the city.

In 1958 and 1959, this team was unbeatable. They were a team to fear in the Ecuadorian league. They were considered a luxury squad. The starting line up included: Sotomayor, Ezio Martinez, Carlos Mendez, Jorge Iza Aguirre, Sierra, Jaime Galarza, Mario Saetero, Colon Merizalde, Gambina, Enrique Raymundi, San Re.

- LIST OF CLUB SPORT PATRIA'S ORIGINAL FOUNDERS

Agustín Febres Cordero Tyler
Agustín Dillon Valdez
Marcos Plaza Sotomayor
César Coronel Espinoza
Alfredo Ycaza Cucalón
Alberto Arrarte Crosby
Armando Pareja Coronel
Adolfo Baquerizo Roca
Octavio Baquerizo Roca
Eduardo Pérez Medina
Gustavo Ycaza Cucalón
Juan Medina Unamuno
Martín Reimberg Tyler
Francisco Gómez Ycaza
Uriel Valdez Castillo
José Santiago Castillo Castillo
Rodrigo Ycaza Cornejo
Fausto Gómez Terán
César Chiriboga Benítez
Gustavo Gómez Ycaza
Carlos Chiriboga Benítez
Manuel Eduardo Castillo Castillo
Juan Vallarino C.
Luis Espinoza Tamayo

== Achievements ==
- Campeonato Ecuatoriano de Fútbol Primera A
  - Runner-up (1): 1961
- Campeonato Segunda Categoría, Zona Guayas
  - Champion (1): 2006
- Campeonato Profesional de Guayaquil
  - Champion (2): 1958, 1959
  - Runner-up (3):1951, 1952, 1954
- Campeonato Amateur del Guayas
  - Champion (2): 1942, 1944
- Copa AsoGuayas
  - Champion (1): 2007
