= Club Deportivo Filanbanco =

Filanbanco
- Full name: Club Deportivo Filanbanco
- Nicknames: El Equipo Bancario, El Equipo Banquero, El Equipo Naranja (The Orange Team)
- Founded: January 29, 1979; 46 years ago February 3, 2020; 5 years ago (refunded)
- Ground: Estadio Alejandro Ponce Noboa
- Chairman: Danny Pazos
- Manager: Juan Cruz Cavallero
- League: Segunda Categoria (Guayas)
- 2024: 32nd finals
Home colours	Away colours

Club Deportivo Filanbanco is a football team based out of Guayaquil, Ecuador. It was formed in 1979 by Filanbanco, one of the largest banks in Ecuador. The club dissolved a little after one decade of existence when it ceded its team to Valdez Sporting Club. Valdez proceeded to dissolve a few years later. It was the Serie A runner-up in 1987.

The club was refunded in February 3 of 2020 after a 29 year absence in Ecuadorian football, a man named Danny Pazos who was in the juvenile team for this club refunded it along with other people who had ties with this team, CD Filanbanco entered the Segunda Categoria aka Ecuador´s 3rd division.

== Achievements ==
- Campeonato Ecuatoriano de Fútbol Serie A

Runner-up (1): 1987

== Notable players ==
- (Ecuador) Perico Mina
- (Ecuador) Alex Cevallos
