= Clásico del Astillero =

Name for Barcelona SC and CS Emelec rivalry

El Clásico del Astillero
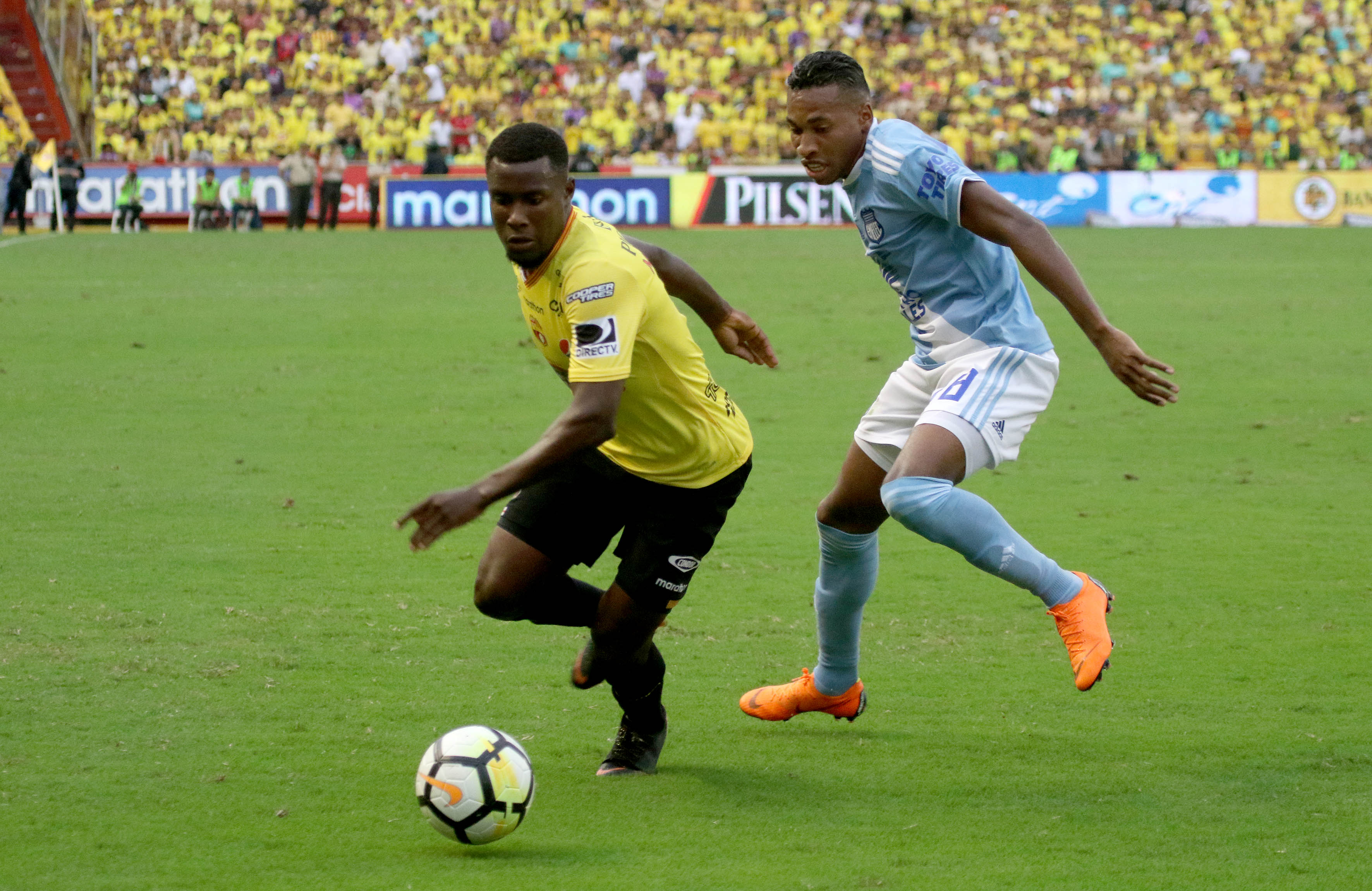
- 2018 Clásico del Astillero
- Other names: El Clásico Ecuatoriano; El partido inmortal del fútbol Ecuatoriano
- Location: Guayaquil, Ecuador
- Teams: Barcelona; Emelec
- First meeting: 22 August 1944; 82 years ago

Statistics
- Most wins: Barcelona (72)
- Most player appearances: José Francisco Cevallos (52 appearances)

The Clásico del Astillero is the football rivalry between the Ecuadorian football teams of Barcelona and Emelec, both based in Guayaquil. Also known as "El partido inmortal" (the immortal match), it is the only Ecuadorian football derby considered among the "34 greatest football rivalries in the world," according to FourFourTwo magazine.

== Origins and background ==
El Clásico del Astillero is a match played against Barcelona's old rival Emelec. It was not until 22 August 1943 that the two sides faced each other for the first time, in a Guayaquil League match. Sporting their distinctive yellow jerseys, Los Canarios defeated El Eléctrico 4-3, with Pedro Villalta scoring a late winner for Barcelona. It was a match that would forever be remembered as The Derby of the Posts, due to the number of times that the Emelec forwards struck the woodwork.

In 1948, the local derby received a name of its own in a preview in the newspaper El Universo, becoming known forever more as El Clásico del Astillero (The Shipyard Derby). In 1990 the two sides met in a Copa Libertadores quarter-final second leg on 29 August. Barcelona advanced to the semi-finals after a 1-0 win.

It has been listed by FIFA as one of the classic football rivalries in the world.

== Incidents ==
=== Sur Oscura destroys George Capwell stadium ===
On April 30, 2006 the second Clásico del Astillero of the year was played. Emelec was leading comfortably 3-0 over Barcelona. When the second half began, the fans of Barcelona, the Sur oscura (Dark south) began rioting in the stadium and in the San Martin stand, where they were situated. First, they started throwing objects onto the field; one struck a linesman, who was injured. Then, they started to take a billboard and break the meshes. The hooligans broke into the radio broadcast booths and looted the private property of the media, causing a scandal that had never been seen before. Some people, who had been seated near the Sur oscura, ran onto the field in fear, to avoid the turmoil of the crowd. There were about 40 injured and nine arrested.

=== Death of a child ===
On September 16, 2007, Carlos Cedeño Veliz, an 11-year-old Emelec fan, died after being hit by a flare before the start of the Clásico del Astillero. The child was born in San Vicente, Manabi province and was with family in one of the suites at the Estadio Monumental Isidro Romero Carbo. When Cedeño was hit, the object came from the southern general stands, the location where Barcelona's ultras, the Sur Oscura (Dark Southern), were situated. About 20 minutes prior to the start of the game, the Sur Oscura fired a flare that hit the child's body. The flare smashed into Cedeño's chest, affecting his lungs and part of the heart.

== On film ==
The rivalries between these two teams is immense in Ecuador and international that it caught the eye of international filmmaker Filmadora Panamericana and in 1973 a movie was made titled "El derecho de los pobres", starting Spanish-Mexican actor Enrique Rambal, Mexican actor Enrique Rocha and Ecuadorian footballer Alberto Spencer, proclaim the best Ecuadorian soccer player of all times, makes his cinema debut.

== Photos ==
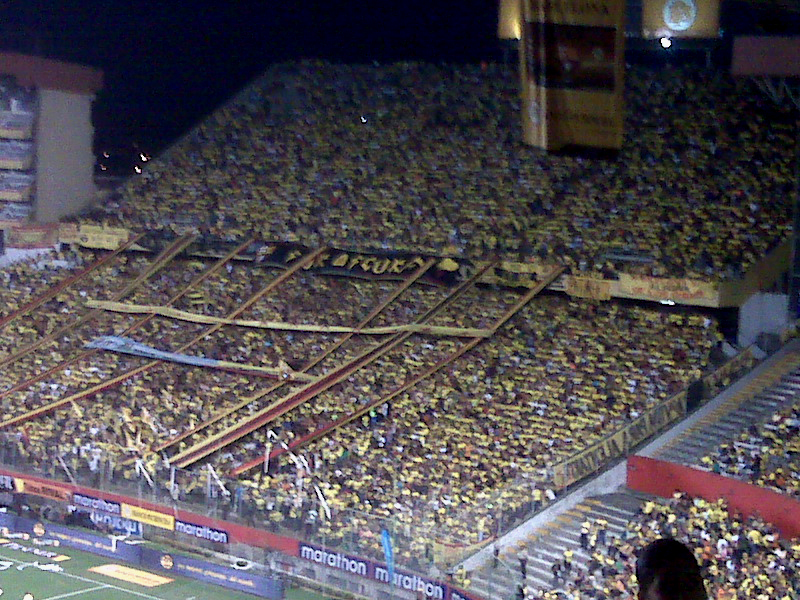
Barcelona's Barra Brava la "Sur Oscura".

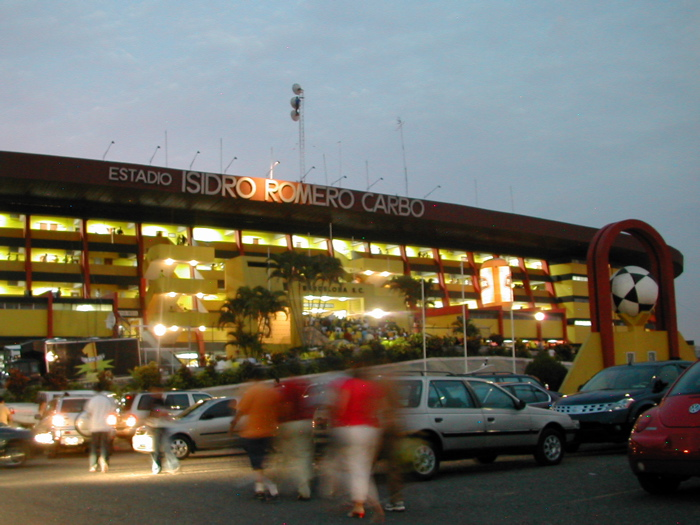
Estadio Monumental Isidro Romero Carbo.

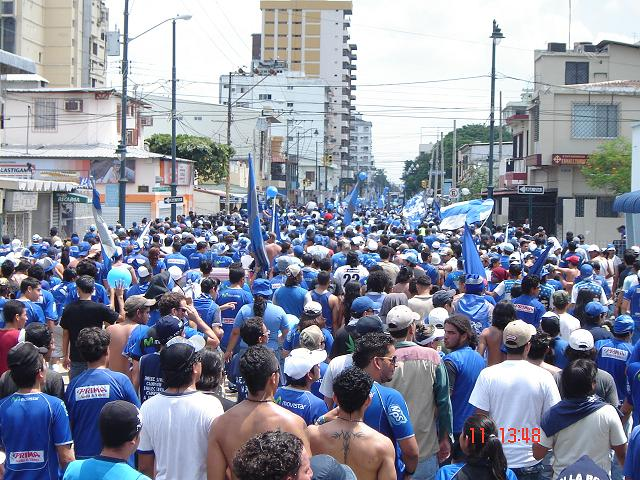
Emelec's Barra Brava "La Boca Del Pozo".

== Statistics ==
As of the last game played (Nov 4, 2012).

- Matches*: 287
  - National Championship: 197
  - Guayas Championship: 45
  - Copa Libertadores: 11
- Barcelona Wins: 97
- Emelec Wins: 101
- Draws: 89
- Goals for Barcelona: 450
- Goals for Emelec: 110

(*) Number is for officially sanctioned professional matches by Asociación de Fútbol del Guayas, Federación Ecuatoriana de Fútbol, & CONMEBOL. Unofficial matches (friendlies, amateur, etc.) have been played.

Special Clasicos: Emelec beat Barcelona in the Clasico played for finals of the official inauguration tournament organized by Barcelona when the Estadio Monumental was opened in 1987.
