= 9 de Octubre F.C. =

9 de Octubre
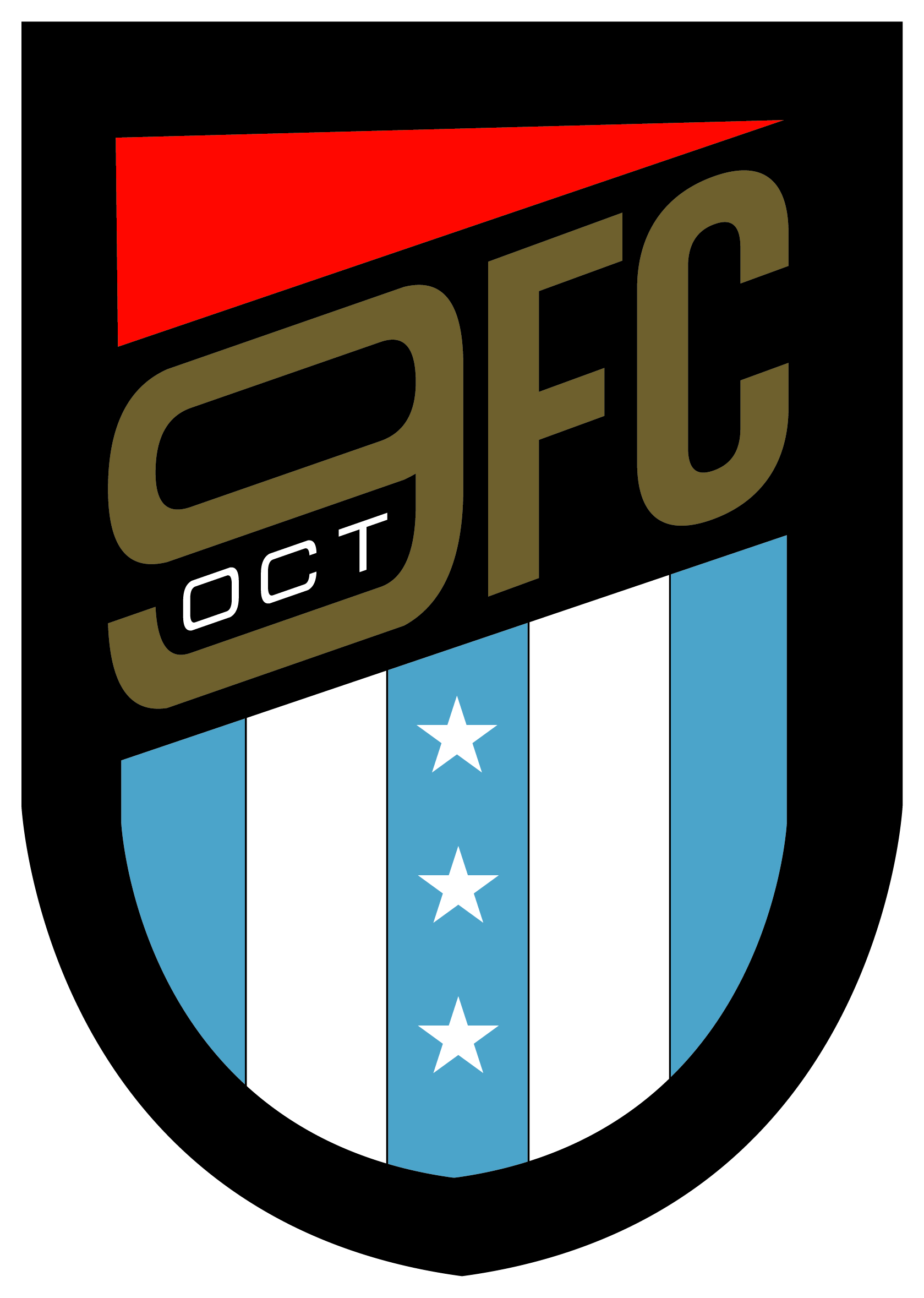
- Full name: 9 de Octubre Fútbol Club
- Nicknames: Octubrinos (Octobrines); El Equipo Patriota (The Patriot Team); Super 9 (Super Nine); La Máquina Celeste y Blanco (The Sky Blue and White Machine); Octubristas (Octobrists)
- Founded: August 25, 1912; 114 years ago, as Club Sport 9 de Octubre
- Ground: Estadio Modelo Alberto Spencer; Guayaquil, Ecuador
- Capacity: 40,000
- Chairman: Andrés Cadme
- Manager: Walter Aristizábal
- League: Serie B
- 2025: 4th
- Website: www.9deoctubre.com
Home colours	Away colours	Third colours

9 de Octubre Fútbol Club, simply referred to as Nueve (9) de Octubre, is a sports club based in Guayaquil, Ecuador. The club is best known for its football team.

Founded in 1912, the club's name commemorates the date the city of Guayaquil declared their independence from Spain (October 9).

== History ==
The club was founded on August 25, 1912 as a football club called Club Sport 9 de Octubre, although it was refounded on April 18, 1926 as a multi-sport club called 9 de Octubre.

During its amateur years, the football team won two Guayas tournaments in 1940 and 1946. The team turned professional in 1962, and participated in the national championship that same year. The following year, the club was runner-up in the professional Guayas tournament. In 1965, the team was national runner-up, which allowed them to participate in their first Copa Libertadores. They achieved back-to-back runners-up in 1983 and 1984, and is seen as the peak of the club's football success. Since then, the team has descended in the Ecuadorian football league system to the third level of football, the Segunda Categoría.

The team had a total of a 22 years being stuck in the Segunda Categoria but they made their return to the Ecuadorian Serie B after being 2nd placers in the Segunda Categoria Tournament

In 2020 they won the Serie B, officially returning to Ecuador's top division after a 25 year absence. In 2022 they were relegated again.

== Honours ==
=== National ===
- Serie B
  - Winners (1): 2020

=== Regional ===
- Campeonato Amateur del Fútbol de Guayaquil
  - Winners (1): 1940
- Campeonato Amateur División Intermedia
  - Winners (1): 1935
- Campeonato Amateur Serie B
  - Winners (1): 1934
- Campeonato Amateur Serie C
  - Winners (1): 1932
- Segunda Categoría del Guayas
  - Winners (3): 1969, 1992, 2019

== Players ==
=== Current squad ===
As of 5 March 2025

Note: Flags indicate national team as defined under FIFA eligibility rules; some limited exceptions apply. Players may hold more than one non-FIFA nationality.

No.	Pos.	Nation	Player
1	GK	COL	Brandón Obregón
2	DF	ECU	Jeffrey Quiñónez
3	MF	ECU	Richard Ponton
4	DF	ECU	Elquin Chichande
5	DF	ECU	Jefferson Soto
6	DF	ECU	Douglas Caleño
7	FW	COL	Wilmar Rivas
8	MF	ECU	Adan Rojas
9	FW	ECU	Miguel Grueso
10	FW	ECU	Danne González (Captain)
11	FW	ECU	Reison Arroyo
12	DF	ECU	Alejandro García
13	DF	ECU	Santiago García
14	MF	ECU	Jipson Orovio
16	FW	COL	Hernán Castañeda

No.	Pos.	Nation	Player
17	MF	ECU	Denilson Ramírez
18	FW	ECU	Jhon Martínez
20	MF	ECU	Justin Morán
21	FW	ECU	Jhon Loor
22	GK	ECU	Marlon González
23	FW	COL	Zamyr Rentería
24	DF	COL	Yilmar Celedón
27	MF	COL	Cristian Díaz
29	DF	COL	Yéiler Mosquera
40	MF	ECU	Héctor Chávez
41	FW	ECU	Carlos Arroyo
70	MF	ECU	Luis Moreira
-	GK	ECU	Elkin Gómez
-	DF	ECU	Alex Valencia
-	FW	ECU	Juan Cedillo
