= Club Deportivo El Nacional =

Ecuadorian sports club

El Nacional
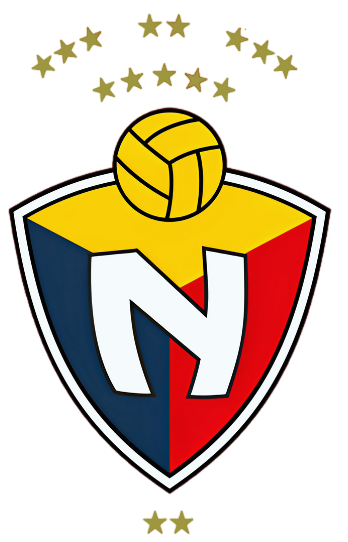
- Full name: Club Deportivo El Nacional
- Nicknames: Los Puros Criollos; La Máquina Gris; El Bi-Tri; El Equipo Militar; La Gloria del Fútbol
- Founded: 1 June 1964; 62 years ago
- Ground: Estadio Olímpico Atahualpa
- Capacity: 35,258
- Chairman: Ricardo Cajas
- Manager: Juan Carlos Pérez
- League: Serie B
- 2026: Serie B, 11th of 12 (relegated)
- Website: www.elnacional.ec
Home colours	Away colours	Third colours

Club Deportivo El Nacional (until 2018 Club Especializado de Alto Rendimiento El Nacional) is an Ecuadorian sports club based in Quito, known best for their professional football team. The team currently plays in the Serie B, the second-tier football league in the country after being relegated from the Serie A in 2025.

El Nacional has thirteen national championships (one less than Emelec and three less than Barcelona). The club has participated in more Copa Libertadores than any other club in Ecuador with 22 appearances. Their best performance in the continental tournament was as a semi-finalist in 1985.

El Nacional was founded on 1 June 1964, and was administered by the Ecuadorian Military since the foundation until 2013, when the club celebrated its first democratic elections. The club has maintained a tradition of only playing Ecuadorian footballers, which has given them the nickname of Puros Criollos ("Pure Natives"). Rival clubs included crosstown clubs LDU Quito, Deportivo Quito, Universidad Católica and the Guayaquileans Barcelona and Emelec. Their home stadium is Estadio Olímpico Atahualpa.

Other sports the organization participates in are gymnastics, table tennis, Ecuavolley, chess, and shooting.

== History ==
=== The 1990s ===
El Nacional produced some of the greatest players in Ecuador and won two more championships in 1992 and 1996 with the help of Cléber Chalá, Agustín Delgado, and Oswaldo Ibarra. They also disputed the semi-finals of the Copa Conmebol 1992 and the 1994 edition.

=== Present ===
The current success of the team has added two more championships in 2005 and 2006, bringing their total to 13 titles. El Nacional has brought up talented players such as Antonio Valencia, Segundo Alejandro Castillo, Christian Benítez and Felix Borja. There have been plans to build a new stadium but no official decision has been taken yet. Former coach Juan Carlos Burbano resigned after an unsuccessful first stage in the league. Julio Asad was appointed head coach on 16 July 2009.In 2024 El Nacional won their biggest achievement in a long time with manager Marcelo Zuleta the team had won the Copa Ecuador.

== Stadium ==
El Nacional play their home matches in the Estadio Olímpico Atahualpa. Plans have been enabled to build a new stadium, however no official decision has been taken. The management even showed the model of what the 42,000-seat stadium would look like.

== Supporters ==
On 13 May 1998, a group of friends met and decided to form a highly dedicated barra brava called La Marea Roja (English: The Red Tide). Over the years, they aimed to integrate more people, and becoming better organized to be the largest fan group of El Nacional. It is made up of over 250 members, with members owning proper identification cards. La Marea Roja stands at the south part of the stadium for 90 minutes every game, which attracts adults, women and large numbers of children.

== Honours ==
=== National ===
- Serie A
  - Winners (13): 1967, 1973, 1976, 1977, 1978, 1982, 1983, 1984, 1986, 1992, 1996, 2005 Clausura, 2006
- Copa Ecuador
  - Winners (2): 1970, 2024
- Serie B
  - Winners (2): 1979 E2, 2022

== Players ==
=== Current squad ===
As of 13 September 2024

Note: Flags indicate national team as defined under FIFA eligibility rules; some limited exceptions apply. Players may hold more than one non-FIFA nationality.

No.	Pos.	Nation	Player
1	GK	ECU	Leodán Chalá
2	DF	ECU	Sander Mazamba
4	DF	ECU	Rommel Cabezas
5	DF	ECU	José Flor
7	MF	ECU	Jeison Chalá
9	FW	ECU	Bryan de Jesús
10	MF	ECU	Jonathan Borja
11	FW	ECU	Vilington Branda
12	GK	ECU	David Cabezas (captain)
15	MF	ECU	Adrian Cela
16	FW	ECU	Jhon Cifuente
17	MF	ECU	Charles Vélez

No.	Pos.	Nation	Player
18	DF	ECU	Bryan Rivera
20	MF	ECU	Jawer Guisamano
24	MF	ECU	Fernando Mora
25	DF	ECU	Marco Montano
26	MF	ECU	Andrés Mena
30	DF	ECU	Franklin Carabalí
32	DF	ECU	Anthony Bedoya
59	FW	ECU	Fricson Borja
60	MF	ECU	Jhoel Maya
77	DF	ECU	Bryan Hernández
99	FW	ECU	Djorkaeff Reasco

=== World Cup players ===
The following players were chosen to represent their country at the FIFA World Cup while contracted to El Nacional.

- (Ecuador) Juan Carlos Burbano (2002)
- (Ecuador) Cléber Chalá (2002)
- (Ecuador) Ángel Fernández (2002)
- (Ecuador) Oswaldo Ibarra (2002)
- (Ecuador) Christian Benítez (2006)
- (Ecuador) Félix Alexander Borja (2006)
- (Ecuador) Segundo Castillo (2006)
- (Ecuador) Jorge Guagua (2006)
- (Ecuador) Christian Lara (2006)
- (Ecuador) Adrián Bone (2014)

== Managers ==
=== Noted managers ===
The following managers won at least one trophy while in charge of El Nacional:

- (Italy) Vessilio Bártoli (won the 1967 Serie A)
- (Ecuador) Héctor Morales (first tenure, won the 1973 Serie A; second tenure, won the 1977 and 1978 Serie A)
- (Ecuador) Ernesto Guerra (won the 1976, 1982, and 1992 Serie A in three tenures)
- (Brazil) Roberto Abrussezze (won the 1983, 1984, and 1986 Serie A)
- (Brazil) Paulo Massa (won the 1996 Serie A)
- (Paraguay) Ever Hugo Almeida (won the 2005 Clausura & 2006 Serie A)
