= América de Quito =

Ecuadorean football club

CD América
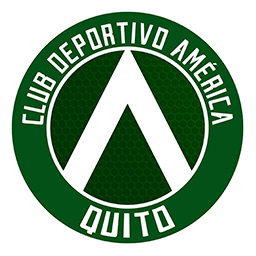
- Full name: Club Deportivo América
- Nickname(s): El Equipo Cebollita; Verdolaga; El Escuadrón Verde (The Green Squad); Los Americanistas
- Founded: November 25, 1939; 85 years ago
- Ground: Estadio Olímpico Atahualpa
- Capacity: 35,258
- Chairman: Gino Guerrón Valenzuela
- Manager: Jhon Jara
- League: Segunda Categoría
- 2023: Serie B, 9th (relegated)
Home colours	Away colours

Club Deportivo América, commonly known as América de Quito, is a football club based in Quito, Ecuador. A top-level club in Ecuador for decades, they were relegated to the second division in 1988 and later to the country's third-tier Segunda Categoría. In 2018, CD América returned to the top flight, but were again relegated a year later.

== Honours ==
=== National ===
- Serie B
  - Winners (1): 1978 E2
- Segunda Categoría
  - Winners (1): 2016

=== Regional ===
- Segunda Categoría de Pichincha
  - Winners (6): 1991, 1992, 2000, 2001, 2002, 2004

== Stadium ==
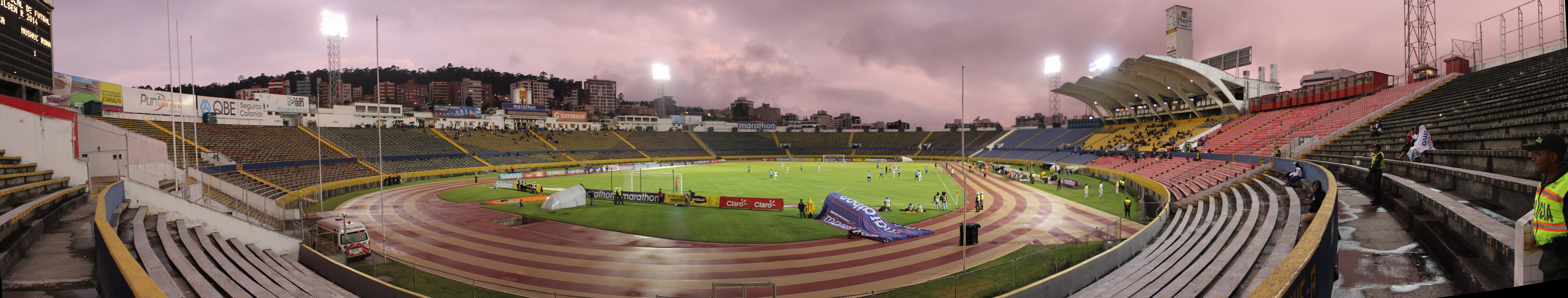
Panoramic view of the Estadio Olímpico Atahualpa in 2015.

== Statistics ==
In Serie A (up to 2019)

- Seasons: 23
- Matches played: 646
  - Wins: 193
  - Draws: 183
  - Losses: 270
- Goals for: 731
- Goals against: 857
- All-time position: 16th

== Current squad ==
As of 27 March 2025

Note: Flags indicate national team as defined under FIFA eligibility rules; some limited exceptions apply. Players may hold more than one non-FIFA nationality.

No.	Pos.	Nation	Player
1	GK	ECU	Jordan Estupiñán
8	MF	ECU	Juan Véliz
9	FW	ECU	Jhon Moreno
10	FW	ECU	Juan Guayasamín
11	MF	ECU	Josué Cortez
12	GK	ECU	Alejandro Sánchez
21	MF	COL	Santiago Cadena
—	DF	ECU	Felipe Cárdenas
—	DF	ARG	Jeremías Ruiz
—	DF	ECU	Jhon Campos
—	MF	ECU	Daniel Santamaria
—	MF	ECU	Andrés Chacón
—	MF	ECU	Jefferson Lara
