= 1967 Intercontinental Cup =

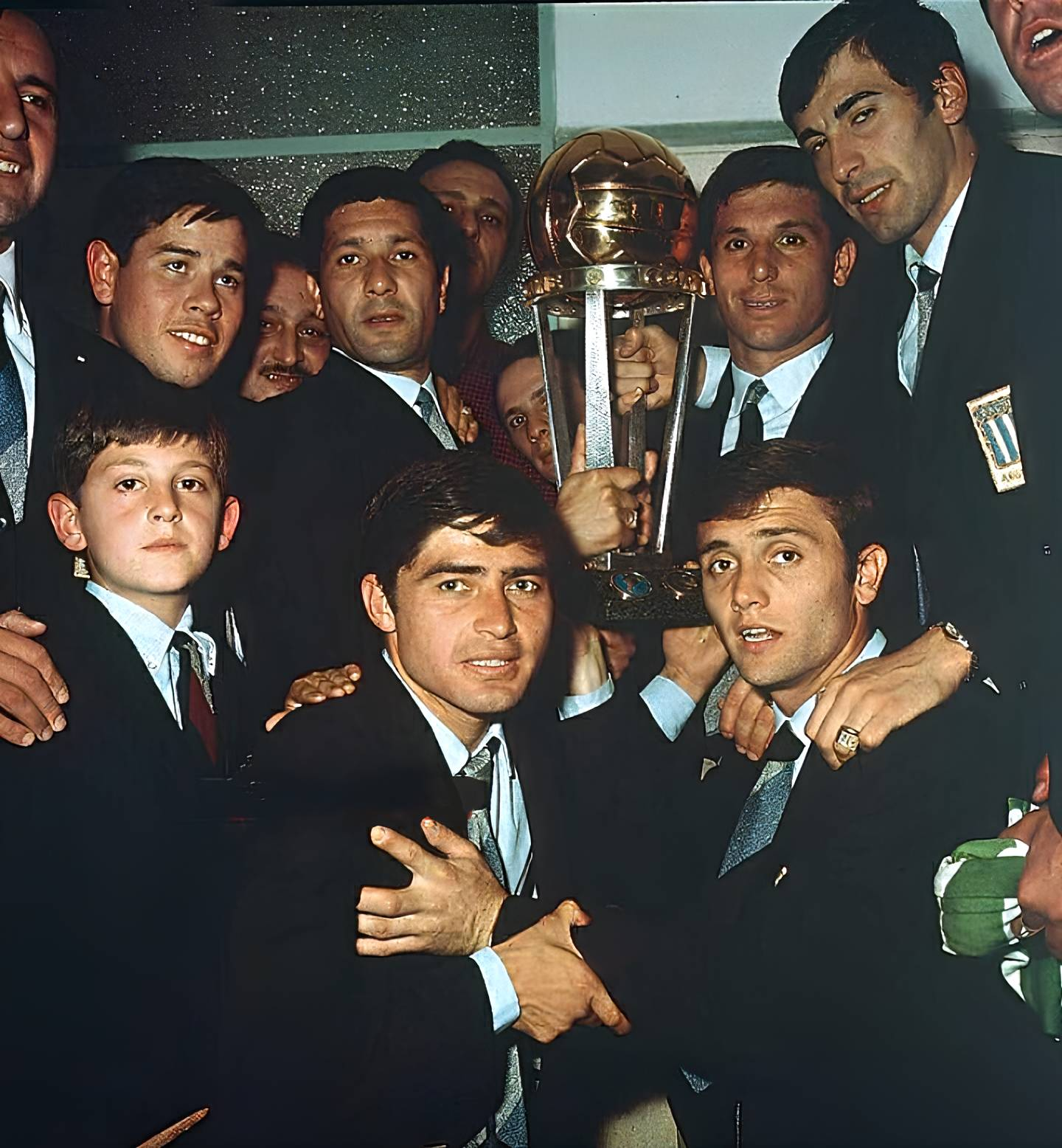
- Racing was the first Argentine team champion of the world
- Event: Intercontinental Cup
Celtic	Racing
(Scotland)	(Argentina)
- 2–2 on points Racing won after a play-off

First leg
Celtic	Racing
1	0
- Date: 18 October 1967
- Venue: Hampden Park, Glasgow
- Referee: Juan Gardeazábal (Spain)
- Attendance: 83,437

Second leg
Racing	Celtic
2	1
- Date: 1 November 1967
- Venue: El Cilindro, Avellaneda
- Referee: Esteban Marino (Uruguay)
- Attendance: 120,000

Play-off
Racing	Celtic
1	0
- Date: 4 November 1967
- Venue: Estadio Centenario, Montevideo
- Referee: Rodolfo Pérez Osorio (Paraguay)
- Attendance: 70,152

The 1967 Intercontinental Cup was a football tie held over three legs in 1967 between the winners of the 1966–67 European Cup, Celtic from Scotland, and Racing Club from Argentina, winners of the 1967 Copa Libertadores.

The first leg was played at Hampden Park in Glasgow, with Celtic winning 1–0 through a Billy McNeill header. The game however was marred by Racing Club's incessant cynical fouling and spitting. The return match at El Cilindro in Avellaneda was also acrimonious, with Celtic's Ronnie Simpson struck by an object thrown from the crowd just before the start of the match. He was badly dazed and had to be replaced by John Fallon. Celtic again took the lead, but Racing fought back to win 2–1 through goals from Norberto Raffo and Juan Carlos Cárdenas.

The series of games went to a play-off match in Montevideo, Uruguay. The game was a shambles, exacerbated by Racing's continued cynical fouling, Celtic's loss of composure and discipline, and the incompetence of the Paraguayan referee who was clearly out of his depth. Riot police had to intervene on the pitch several times as six players were sent off; four from Celtic and two from Racing. Celtic's Bertie Auld however refused to leave the field on being "sent off" and still played for the whole game. Racing scored the only goal of the game in the second half through Cárdenas, winning the game 1–0 and the Intercontinental Cup series, becoming the first Argentinian holders of the trophy.

== Intercontinental Cup rules ==
The rules of the tournament differed from other cup competitions. A match would take place in the home country of each club taking part. Two points were awarded for a win, one point for a draw and none for a defeat. Unlike other two-legged ties, aggregate scores were not taken into account; in other words a team could win their first match 5–0, then lose the next 4–3, but the clubs would tie on equal points. In event of teams finishing on the same number of points, a play-off would then take place in a neutral country on the same continent as where the second match took place.

== First leg ==
The match was reported as being expected to generate around £70,000 in ticket sales, and although the eventual sum was just under £60,000 it was still a record at the time for a football match in Scotland. Racing Club's players were on a £2,000 bonus each in event of winning the series of games (their basic annual salary was £5,000). On arrival in Scotland, the Racing Club squad kept a low profile and were praised for their quiet polite manner.

Racing Club forward Humberto Maschio was technically under suspension, but as the Intercontinental Cup was not sanctioned by FIFA, the Argentinians elected to play him anyway. Celtic manager Jock Stein declined to protest this, stating that Celtic wished to play against the "best players that Racing could put on the field". Celtic winger Jimmy Johnstone was in a similar position for the return match in Argentina, but the SFA insisted he not play that game. Racing Club manager Juan José Pizzuti however publicly stated he saw no reason why Johnstone should not play. In the event, Stein ignored the SFA and played Johnstone in all three games.

Jock Stein fielded largely the same side that won the European Cup in May 1967, with the only change being John Hughes replacing Stevie Chalmers in the forward line. Racing Club also fielded virtually the same side that won the Copa Libertadores, with Juan José Rodriguez taking the place of João Cardoso in the line-up against Celtic at Hampden Park.

Celtic started the match on the attack. On eight minutes, Racing Club defender Alfio Basile fouled Johnstone as he ran in on goal. A free kick was awarded by the Spanish referee, although the foul appeared to have taken place within the penalty area. Johnstone continued to trouble the Racing Club defence, and was fouled on numerous occasions. From early in the match, it was clear the Argentinians had set out to play for a draw; playing with a massed defence and time wasting at every possible opportunity. Worse, the game was marred by their incessant cynical fouling and spitting. Celtic struggled to play at their normal rhythm and could only manage two notable goalscoring chances in the first half. At half-time Jimmy Johnstone returned to the dressing room with his hair soaked with the spit of his opponents.

The second half started in similar fashion, with Celtic pressing forward against a deep lying Racing Club defence. Billy McNeill hit the post with a header from a Bertie Auld free kick in 55 minutes. On 69 minutes, goalkeeper Agustín Cejas pushed a John Hughes shot around the post. Hughes took the resulting corner kick, and McNeill steered a well directed header over Cejas into the far corner of the goal, despite Rubén Díaz's vain effort to keep the ball out with his hand.

Celtic ran out 1–0 winners, but their players showed signs of having taken part in an excessively physical encounter. Billy McNeill had a black eye, Bertie Auld had been headbutted and Bobby Lennox sustained a vicious blow on his ear which ruled him out of playing for Scotland that weekend. After the match, Stein commented that "almost every [Celtic] player needs treatment for knocks."

French sports newspaper L'Equipe described the atmosphere at the game as "incredible", but noted that the match was marred by too many fouls in a "furious battle". L'Equipe added that Celtic "dominated their rivals territorially" and won in "extremely difficult circumstances". Spanish sports newspaper Marca praised Racing Club's defence and their success in largely stifling Celtic's attacking play. The Gazzetta Dello Sport were more critical of Celtic, stating the Scots win on the night "did not enchant anyone" and that Celtic were "lucky" to defeat Racing Club.

=== Details ===
18 October 1967
20:00 BST

Celtic (Scotland)	1–0	(Argentina) Racing
McNeill 69'	Report

Hampden Park, Glasgow
Attendance: 83,437
Referee: Juan Gardeazábal (Spain)

Celtic	Racing

GK	1	(Scotland) Ronnie Simpson
RB	2	(Scotland) Jim Craig
LB	3	(Scotland) Tommy Gemmell
CM	4	(Scotland) Bobby Murdoch
CB	5	(Scotland) Billy McNeill (c)
CB	6	(Scotland) John Clark
RF	7	(Scotland) Jimmy Johnstone
CF	8	(Scotland) Bobby Lennox
CF	9	(Scotland) Willie Wallace
CM	10	(Scotland) Bertie Auld
LF	11	(Scotland) John Hughes
Manager:
(Scotland) Jock Stein

GK	1	(Argentina) Agustín Cejas
RB	2	(Argentina) Roberto Perfumo
LB	3	(Argentina) Rubén Oswaldo Díaz
CB	4	(Argentina) Oscar Martín (c)
MF	5	(Argentina) Miguel Mori
CB	6	(Argentina) Alfio Basile
RF	7	(Argentina) Norberto Raffo
MF	8	(Argentina) Juan Carlos Rulli
CF	9	(Argentina) Juan Carlos Cárdenas
CF	10	(Argentina) Juan José Rodríguez
LF	11	(Argentina) Humberto Maschio
Manager:
(Argentina) Juan José Pizzuti

Linesmen:
Sánchez Ibáñez (Spain)
Gómez Platas (Spain)

== Second leg ==
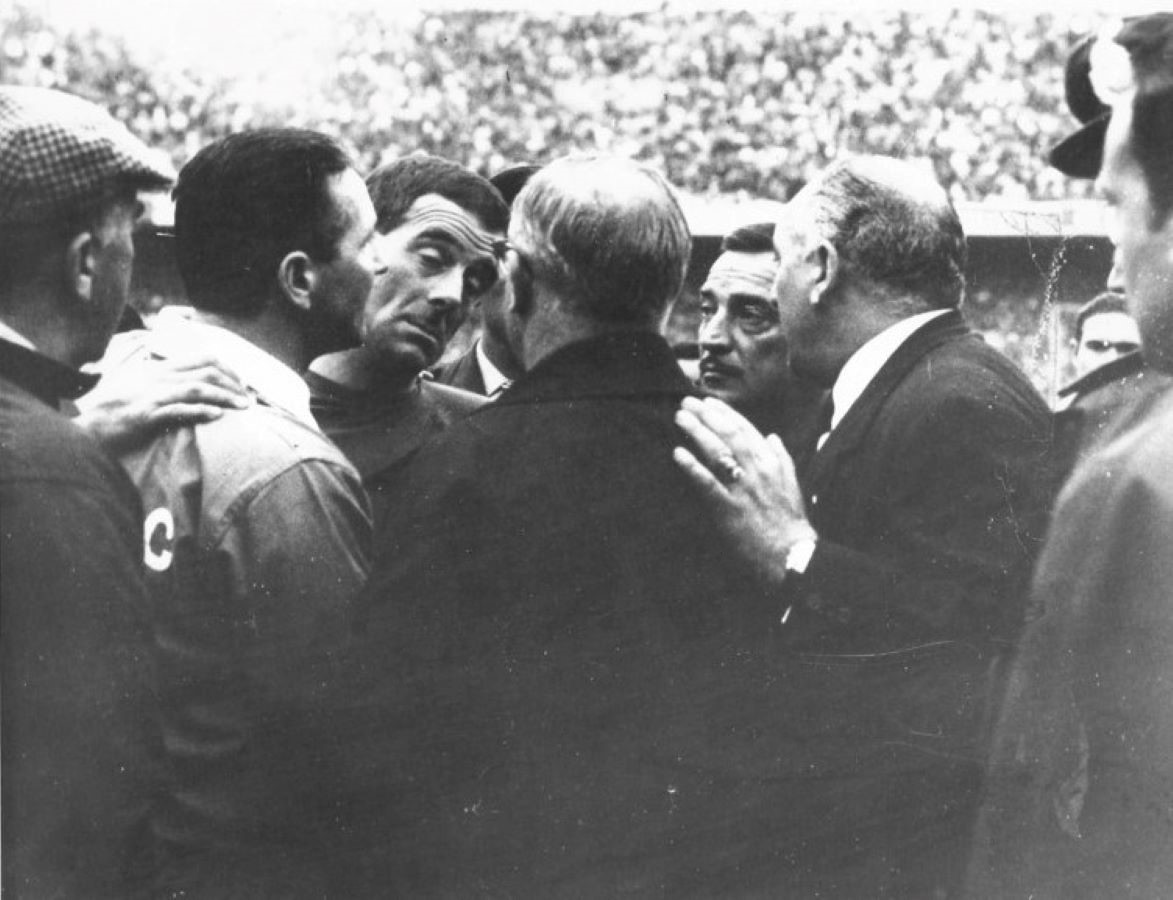
Ronnie Simpson protesting to the match officials after being attacked by the crowd in Avellaneda.

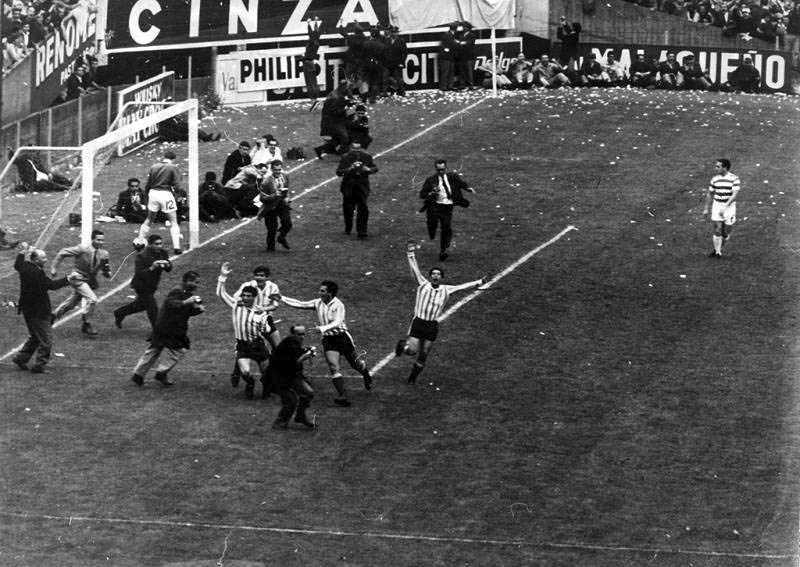
The celebration of the Racing players after Raffo’s goal.

In the lead up the second leg, Racing Club found themselves in a form slump. The club had lost four successive games (including the first leg in Scotland) and failed to score in any of them. Defender Miguel Mori then suffered an allergic reaction to a pain-killing injection and was ruled out for the second leg.

The return match in Buenos Aires was the first time that Celtic had crossed the Equator, with the journey comprising a 20-hour flight from Scotland. Celtic captain Billy McNeill described Celtic's initial welcome in Argentina as being very warm and friendly. However, by the time of the game the crowd in the stadium were considerably more hostile, with McNeill later describing the reception at El Cilindro as "nothing short of horrific". There were at least 120,000 spectators in the stadium, making it the association football match with the largest attendance in Argentina's history.

Amidst a volatile atmosphere in the stadium, trouble flared even before kick-off. As Celtic goalkeeper Ronnie Simpson lined up in goal, he was struck on the head by an object thrown from the terracing. Simpson was badly dazed and had to be replaced in goal by substitute John Fallon. Simpson believed he had been struck by a bottle, but others said it was a stone fired from a catapult.

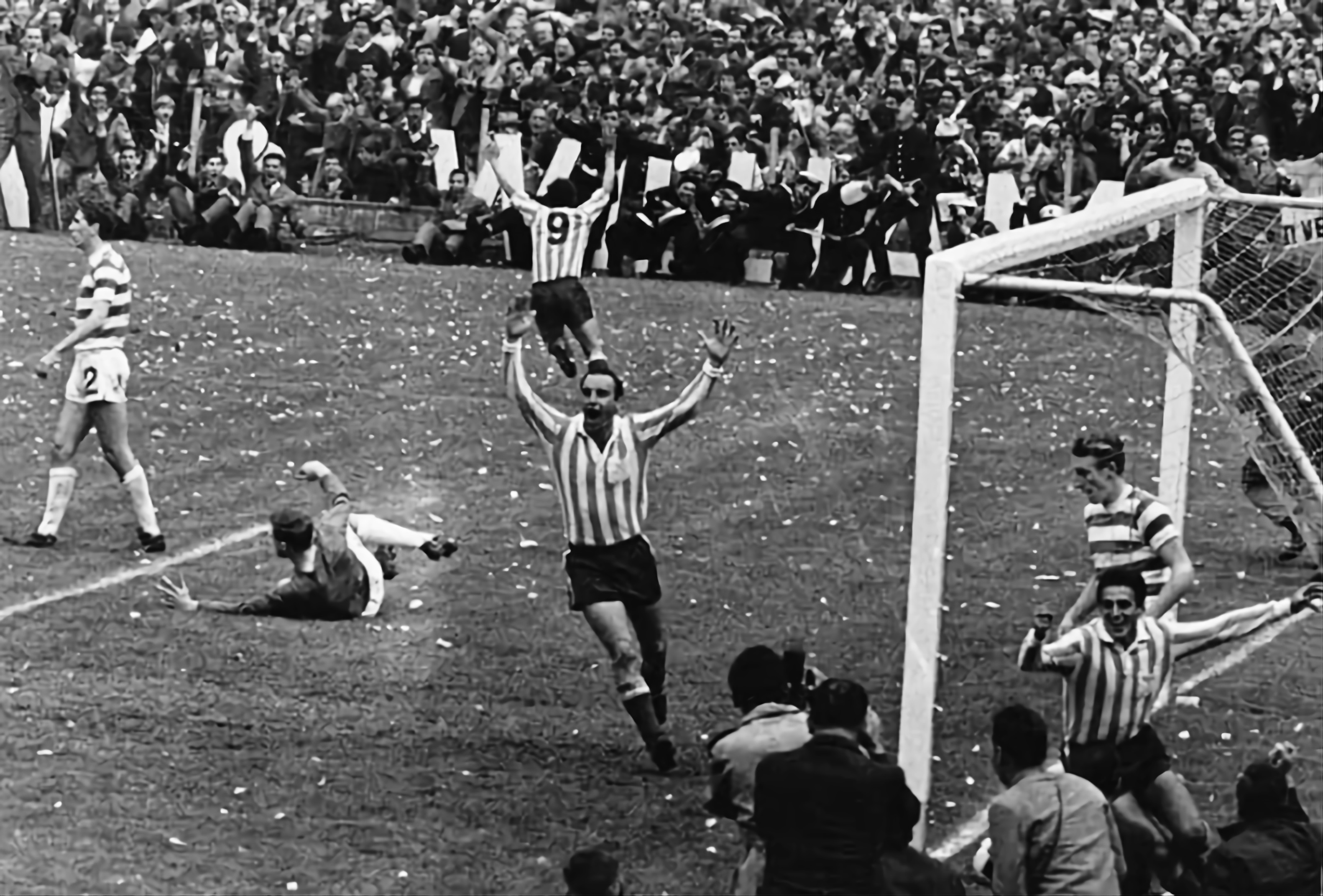
Racing’s second goal, scored by Cárdenas in the second half.

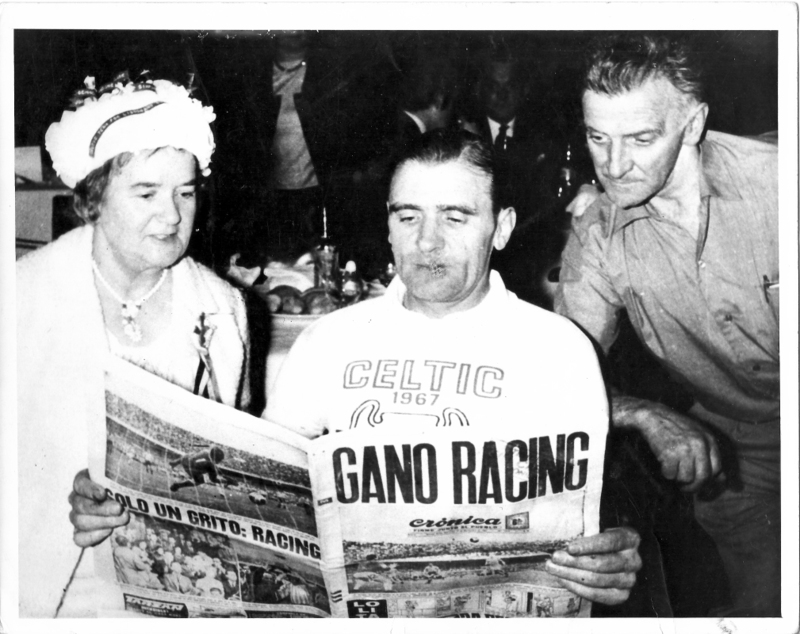
Jock Stein pictured contemplating his Celtic F.C. team's defeat to Racing in Argentina’s newspaper Crónica.

When the game finally began, Racing Club abandoned their defensive play of the first leg and pressed forward for an early goal. João Cardoso forced a save from John Fallon. Celtic attacked too, and Johnstone headed the ball into the goal only for it to be ruled offside. Celtic took the lead in 22 minutes after Johnstone was brought down in the penalty box by goalkeeper Cejas. Tommy Gemmell took the penalty kick and scored, despite the efforts of a dozen Argentinian press photographers who had encroached onto the pitch and were gesticulating at him in an effort to distract him. Racing Club rallied however, and equalised on 34 minutes with a finely taken goal; Norberto Raffo looping a header past Fallon from a Maschio cross.

Racing Club took the lead early in the second half; Juan Carlos Cárdenas latching onto a pass from Juan Rulli and shooting past Fallon. After that, Racing Club took control of the match; slowing the pace and ably defending against Celtic's fading attacks.

Despite the chaos at the start with Simpson's injury, the match itself was played in a better spirit than the first leg, largely due to the firm officiating of Uruguayan referee Esteban Marino. This was noted by Portuguese sports newspaper A Bola who felt that the Uruguayan official was more familiar with dealing with the Argentinians' antics.

After the game, the Scottish dressing room was invaded by Argentinian fans and a battle between Argentinian and Uruguayan (who had travelled to Buenos Aires to support Celtic) fans broke out outside the stadium.

Increasingly angered by events on and off the pitch, Celtic manager Jock Stein told reporters "We [Celtic] don't want to go to Montevideo or anywhere else in South America for a third game. But we know we have to."

=== Details ===
1 November 1967
16:45 ART (UTC−3)

Racing (Argentina)	2–1	(Scotland) Celtic
Raffo 34'; Cárdenas 48'	Report	Gemmell 23' (pen.)

El Cilindro, Avellaneda
Attendance: 120,000
Referee: Esteban Marino (Uruguay)

Racing	Celtic

GK	1	(Argentina) Agustín Cejas
RB	2	(Argentina) Roberto Perfumo
LB	3	(Uruguay) Nelson Chabay
CB	4	(Argentina) Oscar Martín (c)
MF	5	(Argentina) Juan Carlos Rulli
CB	6	(Argentina) Alfio Basile
RF	7	(Argentina) Norberto Raffo
MF	8	(Brazil) João Cardoso
CF	9	(Argentina) Juan Carlos Cárdenas
CF	10	(Argentina) Juan José Rodríguez
LF	11	(Argentina) Humberto Maschio
Manager:
(Argentina) Juan José Pizzuti

GK	12	(Scotland) John Fallon
RB	2	(Scotland) Jim Craig
LB	3	(Scotland) Tommy Gemmell
CM	4	(Scotland) Bobby Murdoch
CB	5	(Scotland) Billy McNeill (c)
CB	6	(Scotland) John Clark
RF	7	(Scotland) Jimmy Johnstone
CF	8	(Scotland) Willie Wallace
CF	9	(Scotland) Stevie Chalmers
CM	10	(Scotland) Willie O'Neill
LF	11	(Scotland) Bobby Lennox
Manager:
(Scotland) Jock Stein

== Play-off ==
As both teams were level on two points each after two legs, a play-off was required to take place at a neutral venue. The third match was held in Montevideo and has since been known as "The Battle of Montevideo".

In the build-up to the third match, Jock Stein told reporters that Celtic wanted to win, "not so much for ourselves but to prevent Racing from becoming champions". With regard to Racing Club's violent conduct in the previous two matches, Stein commented that Celtic's players would not look for trouble in the play-off game, but would "give as much as they are forced to take." Celtic, however, were satisfied with the safety precautions that were in place at the Estadio Centenario; the pitch was surrounded by a moat topped with a steel barrier and barbed wire, and the stands were much further back from the field than at Racing Club's ground, thus minimising the likelihood of any repetition of a player being struck by an object thrown by fans.

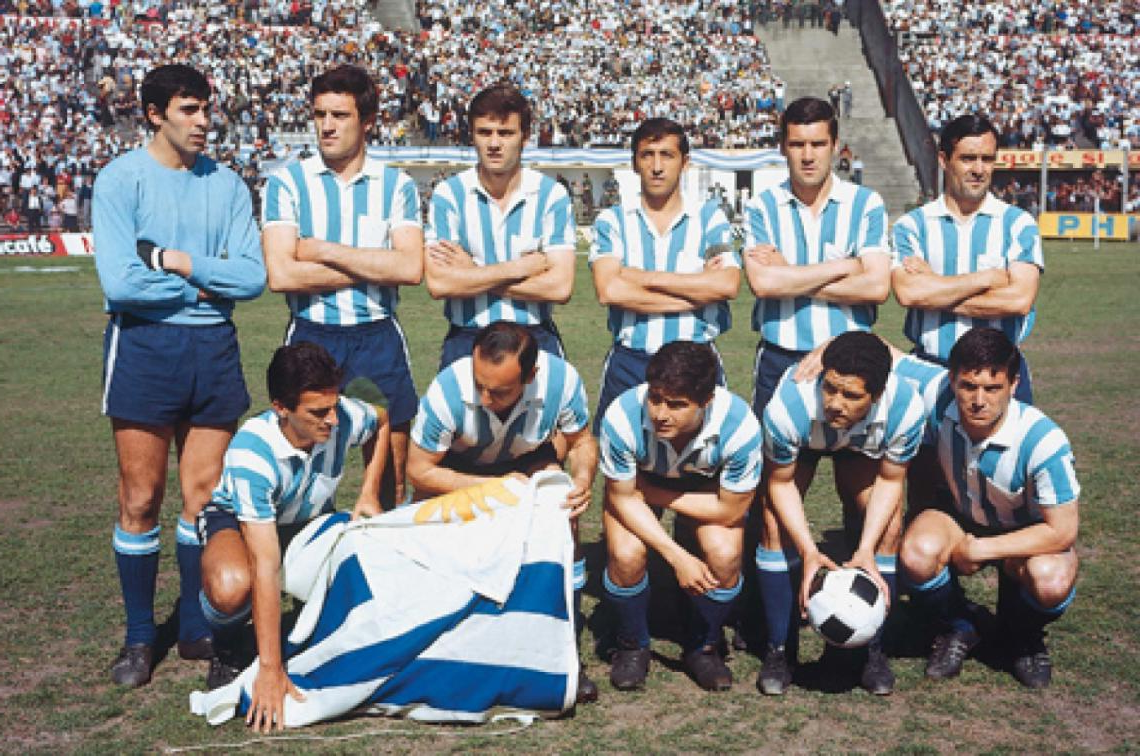
Starting Racing Club line-up, posing before the match in Montevideo

Celtic announced that Bertie Auld and John Hughes would return to the side in place of Willie O'Neill and Stevie Chalmers who had played the match in Buenos Aires. John Fallon kept his place in goal in place of Ronnie Simpson. Racing Club declined to comment prior to the match about their line-up or formation.

The game started with a series of fouls by both sides. Eventually Paraguayan referee Rodolfo Perez Osorio stopped the match after 23 minutes and warned both captains via an interpreter that players would be sent off should the foul play not stop. However, his pleas were not heeded.

The match erupted 14 minutes later when Jimmy Johnstone was hacked down by Juan Rulli. As Johnstone writhed in pain on the ground, a melee ensued between various opposing players. John Clark approached both Rulli and Alfio Basile with his fists up, striking a pose reminiscent of a bare-knuckle boxer. Uruguayan riot police took to the pitch to quell the ongoing disturbance. Eventually after five minutes, Racing Club's Basile and Celtic's Bobby Lennox were sent off. Initially observers believed Lennox had been sent off in a case of mistaken identity as he had not appeared to have committed any offence. However it later became known that the referee had earlier threatened to send off Racing Club's number 6 (Basile) and Celtic's number 8 (Lennox) for the next serious offence committed by their respective sides, even if the players themselves were not guilty of the offence. Jock Stein attempted to get Lennox to stay on the field, but the Celtic player eventually was ushered off the pitch by a police officer wielding a sword.

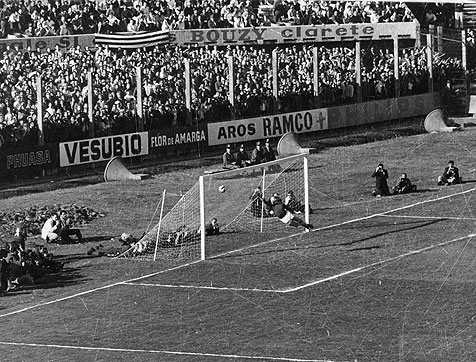
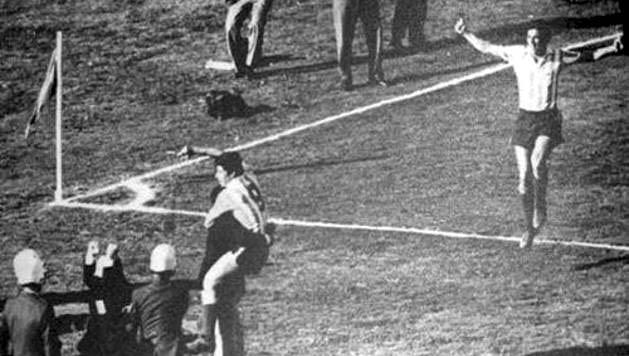
(Above): the moment when the goal is scored after a shot by Cárdenas from 25 yards; (below): Cárdenas (n° 9) celebrating with his teammates

Racing Club began to take advantage as Celtic's composure and discipline disintegrated. On 48 minutes, Johnstone on being held back by Rulli, lashed out at the Argentinian in frustration and was duly sent off. Six minutes later, Racing Club took the lead when Cárdenas scored from 25 yards out with a superb left-footed shot into goalkeeper Fallon's top left corner. Celtic were reduced further in numbers after 74 minutes when John Hughes was sent off for kicking Cejas as he lay on the ground. Shortly afterwards Rulli was sent off for punching Celtic's John Clark. Two minutes from time, another melee erupted between the sides, resulting once again in the intervention of the Uruguayan riot police. Bertie Auld was sent off, but refused to leave the field and eventually played the full match. He was however reported by the referee afterwards. Whilst Auld refused to leave the field, amidst the total chaos on the field Tommy Gemmell kicked one of the Racing Club players in his genitals, which went unnoticed by the referee. The game finished 1–0 to Racing Club, clinching the trophy for the South American champions and making them the first Argentinian holders of the Intercontinental Cup. In total, 30 fouls were given against Celtic and 21 against Racing Club. Most fouls however went unnoticed or were not called by the referee.

As the Racing Club players wanted to do a lap of honour around the stadium at full time, Uruguayan fans who had been supporting Celtic showered them with anything they could throw. The Racing Club players had to wait in the centre of the field, until the police had cleared the way to their dressing room.

Jock Stein commented after the match, "I would not bring a team to South America again for all the money in the world."

In an otherwise acrimonious and bad spirited series of matches, there was at least one act of sportsmanship. After full-time in Montevideo, as Racing Club defender Roberto Perfumo made his way to the tunnel he was approached by Celtic captain Billy McNeill. Initially apprehensive, Perfumo then realised McNeill wished to shake hands. The players then exchanged jerseys, after which Perfumo hugged McNeill and said to him (in Spanish), "This is how football should be played." McNeill smiled and replied in perfect Spanish, "Buena suerte, buena suerte." (in English, "Good luck, good luck".) Perfumo later expressed his appreciation of McNeill's sportsmanship and described their encounter as his "most treasured moment of this world championship."

=== Details ===
4 November 1967
15:50 UYT (UTC−3)

Racing (Argentina)	1–0	(Scotland) Celtic
Cárdenas 55'	Report

Estadio Centenario, Montevideo
Attendance: 70,152
Referee: Rodolfo Pérez Osorio (Paraguay)

Racing	Celtic

GK	1	(Argentina) Agustín Cejas
CB	2	(Argentina) Roberto Perfumo
LB	3	(Uruguay) Nelson Chabay
RB	4	(Argentina) Oscar Martín (c)
MF	5	(Argentina) Juan Carlos Rulli	(red card) 78'
CB	6	(Argentina) Alfio Basile	(red card) 42'
RF	7	(Argentina) Norberto Raffo
MF	8	(Brazil) João Cardoso
CF	9	(Argentina) Juan Carlos Cárdenas
CF	10	(Argentina) Juan José Rodríguez
LF	11	(Argentina) Humberto Maschio
Manager:
(Argentina) Juan José Pizzuti

GK	1	(Scotland) John Fallon
RB	2	(Scotland) Jim Craig
LB	3	(Scotland) Tommy Gemmell
CM	4	(Scotland) Bobby Murdoch
CB	5	(Scotland) Billy McNeill (c)
CB	6	(Scotland) John Clark
RF	7	(Scotland) Jimmy Johnstone	(red card) 48'
CF	8	(Scotland) Bobby Lennox	(red card) 42'
CF	9	(Scotland) Willie Wallace
CM	10	(Scotland) Bertie Auld	(red card) 88'
LF	11	(Scotland) John Hughes	(red card) 74'
Manager:
(Scotland) Jock Stein

== Aftermath ==
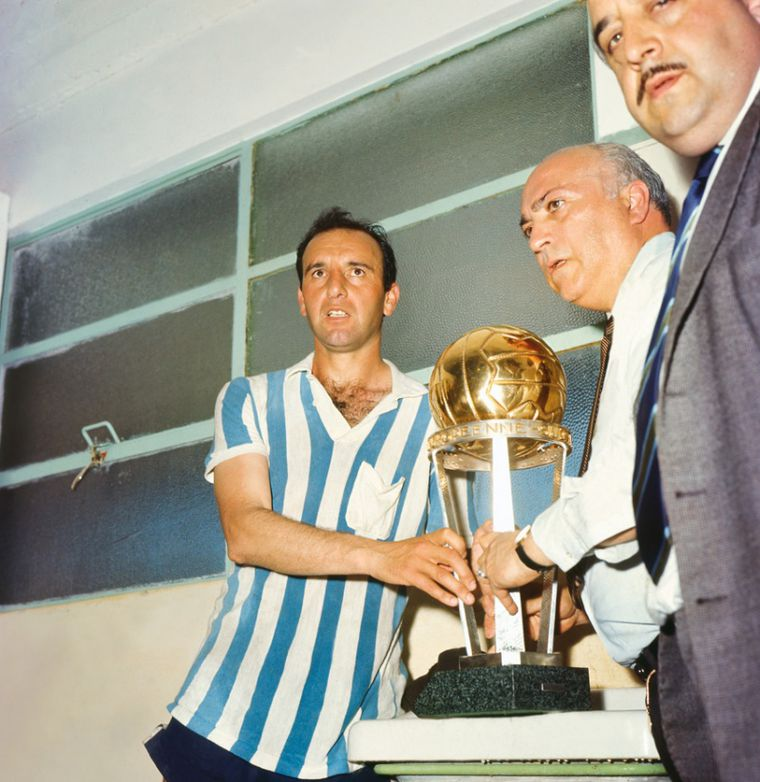
Humberto Maschio and some Racing executives with the Intercontinental Cup trophy

Racing Club's victory was acclaimed throughout Argentina, even by supporters of rival clubs. Racing Club's defender Basile described the win as an "immense joy that for me as a player was the greatest I ever experienced", noting that even fans of arch city-rivals Independiente celebrated. The Racing Club players all received a new car as well as their promised £2,000 bonus.

Celtic returned to Scotland, with chairman Robert Kelly referring to the game as "an ugly, brutal match containing no football." He also expressed disappointment that Celtic "descended to that level [of Racing Club] to defend themselves." A few days later the Celtic board of directors fined every player £250 for their behaviour in Montevideo. Reports of the Racing Club players' bonuses only added to the ignominy.

Press coverage of the Montevideo match was scathing. Reuters described the match as "a bar-room brawl with football skills abandoned for swinging fists, flying boots and blatant body checking". L'Équipe described the match as a "sad, lamentable spectacle". They noted that "the Argentinians started the hostilities" but pointed out that Celtic "made use of every opportunity to return the blows". The Argentine magazine El Gráfico praised Rodolfo Pérez Osorio’s "good refereeing, particularly given the atmosphere of violence that prevailed throughout the match".

Subsequent Intercontinental ties would frequently descend again into violence. The following year's clash between Manchester United and another Argentinian side, Estudiantes de La Plata, was again marred by constant cynical play on the part of the South Americans. Worse violence would follow in the 1969 tie between Estudiantes and Italian side AC Milan, where Milan's Pierino Prati was knocked unconscious and Nestor Combin was battered by several Argentinian players - breaking his nose and cheekbone - before being dragged semi-conscious off a stretcher and arrested by Argentine police on trumped-up charges. The increasing violence of South American teams led to the reluctance of several European clubs to take part in the Intercontinental Cup throughout the 1970s.

The tie also inspired a popular Celtic song, "The World Club Championship song", which describes the match as "the dirtiest game I've ever seen".

In 2017, FIFA formally recognised all winners of the Intercontinental Cup, including Racing Club, as "world champions".

== See also ==
- Celtic F.C. in international football
