= 1967 Copa Libertadores finals =

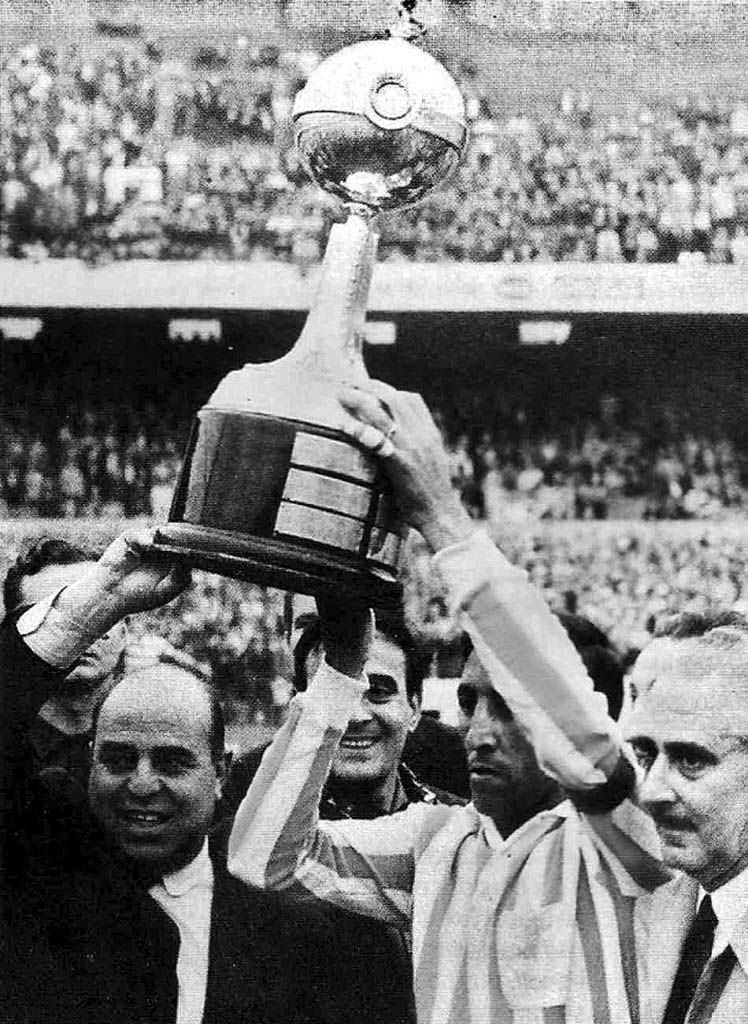
- Racing Club, champions. Oscar Martín holding the trophy
- Event: 1967 Copa Libertadores
Racing	Nacional
(Argentina)	(Uruguay)
- 2–2 on points Racing won after a play-off

First leg
Racing	Nacional
0	0
- Date: 15 August 1967
- Venue: El Cilindro, Avellaneda
- Referee: César Orozco (Peru)
- Attendance: 99,148

Second leg
Nacional	Racing
0	0
- Date: 25 August 1967
- Venue: Estadio Centenario, Montevideo
- Referee: César Orozco (Peru)
- Attendance: 60,000

Playoff
Nacional	Racing
1	2
- Date: 29 August 1967
- Venue: Estadio Nacional, Santiago
- Attendance: 50,000
- Weather: Rodolfo Pérez Osorio (Paraguay)

The 1967 Copa Libertadores finals were the two-legged final that decided the winner of the 1967 Copa Libertadores, the 8th edition of the Copa Libertadores de América, South America's premier international club football tournament organized by CONMEBOL.

The finals were contested in two-legged home-and-away format between Argentine team Racing Club de Avellaneda and Uruguayan team Nacional. The first leg was hosted by Racing at El Cilindro of Avellaneda on 15 August 1967, while the second leg was played at Estadio Centenario in Montevideo on 25 August 1967.

After both games were drawn, a third game was hosted at Estadio Nacional in Santiago de Chile on 29 August 1967. Racing beat Nacional by 2–1 therefore winning their 1st. Copa Libertadores title.

== Teams ==
Team	Previous finals appearances (bold indicates winners)
(Argentina) Racing	None
(Uruguay) Nacional	1964

== Venues ==
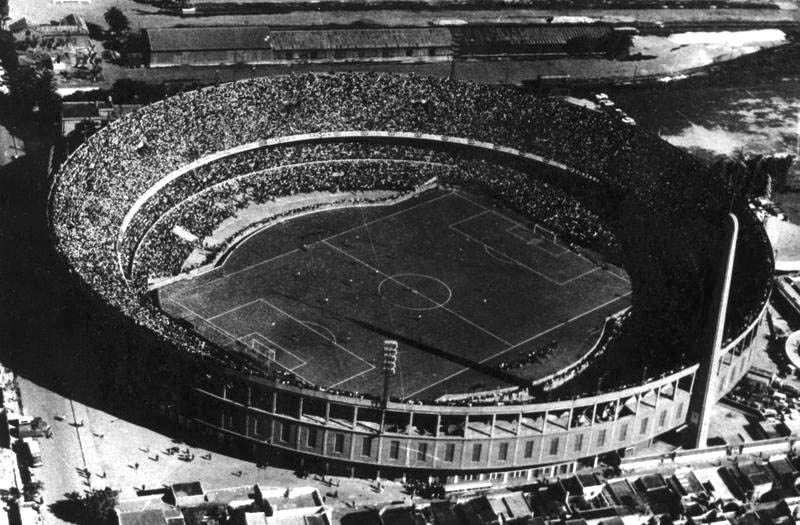
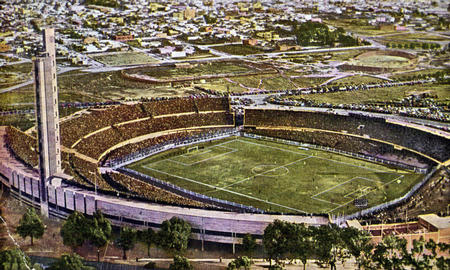
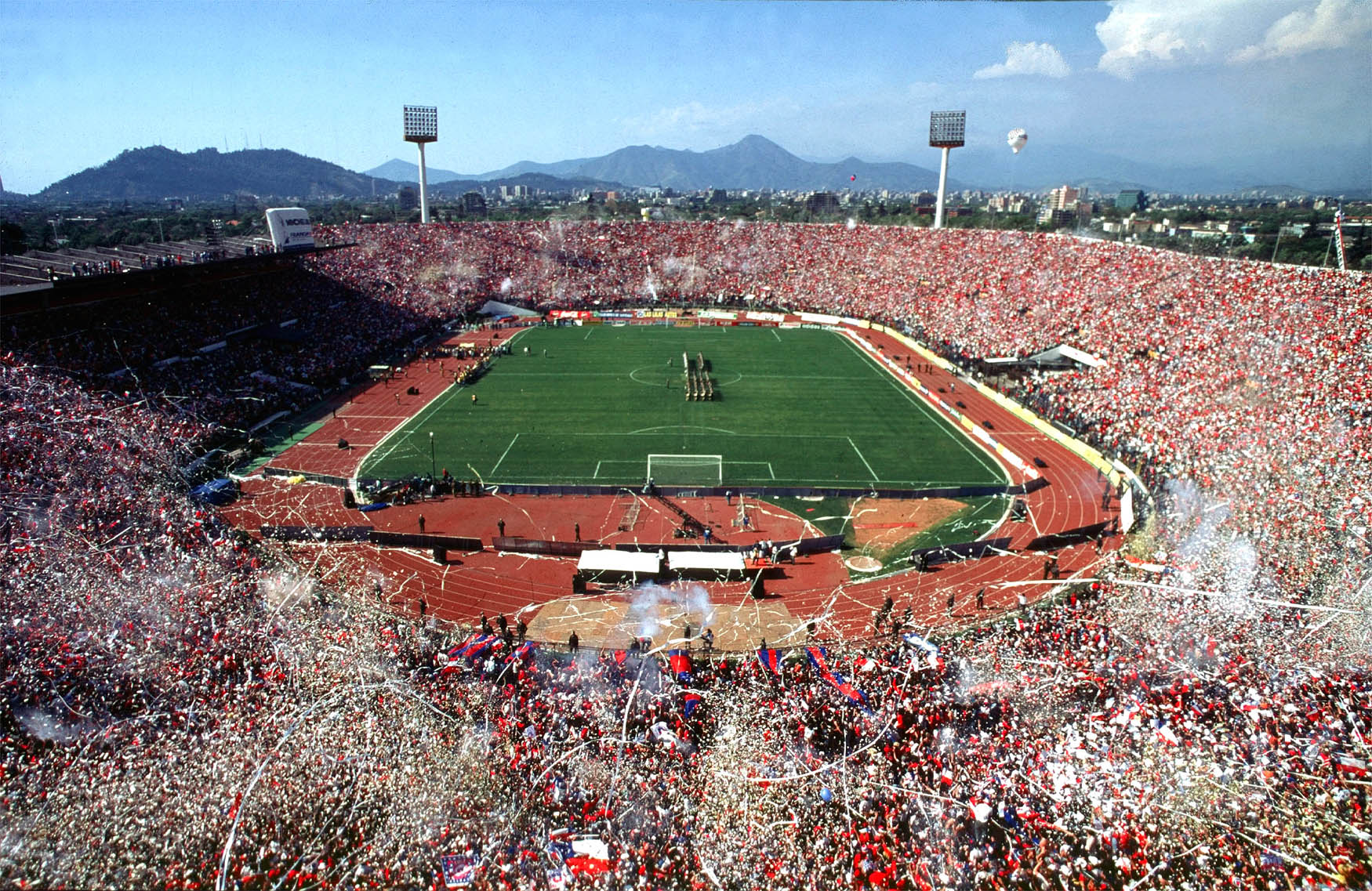
El Cilindro, Estadio Centenario and Estadio Nacional were the venues

== Matches ==
=== First leg ===
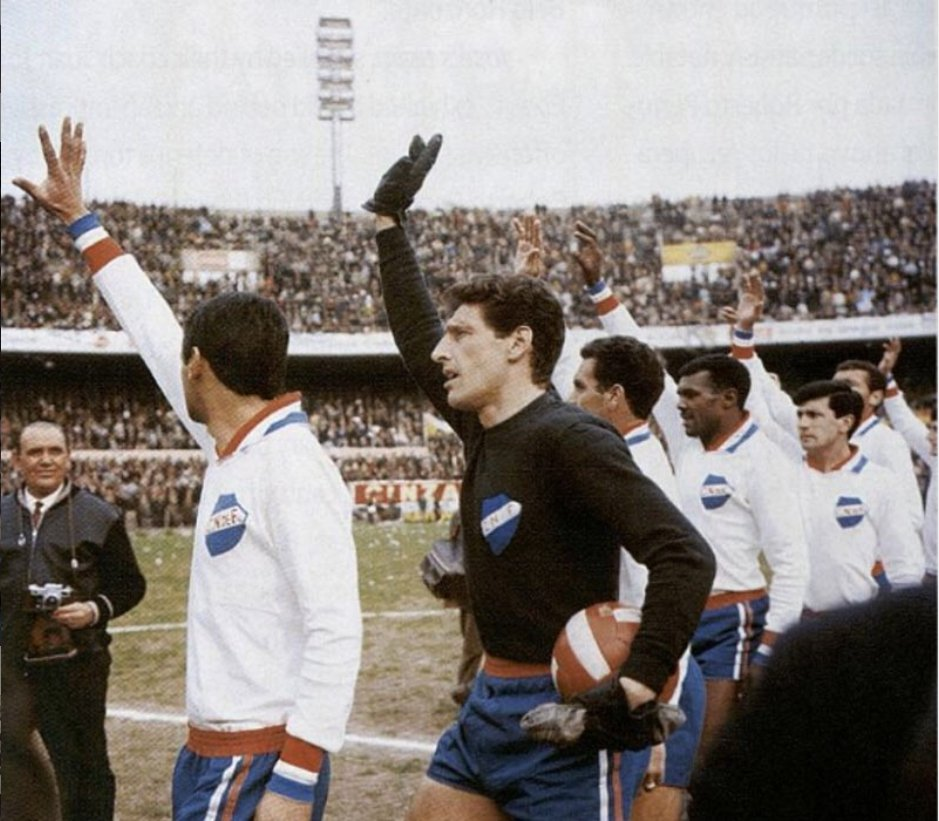
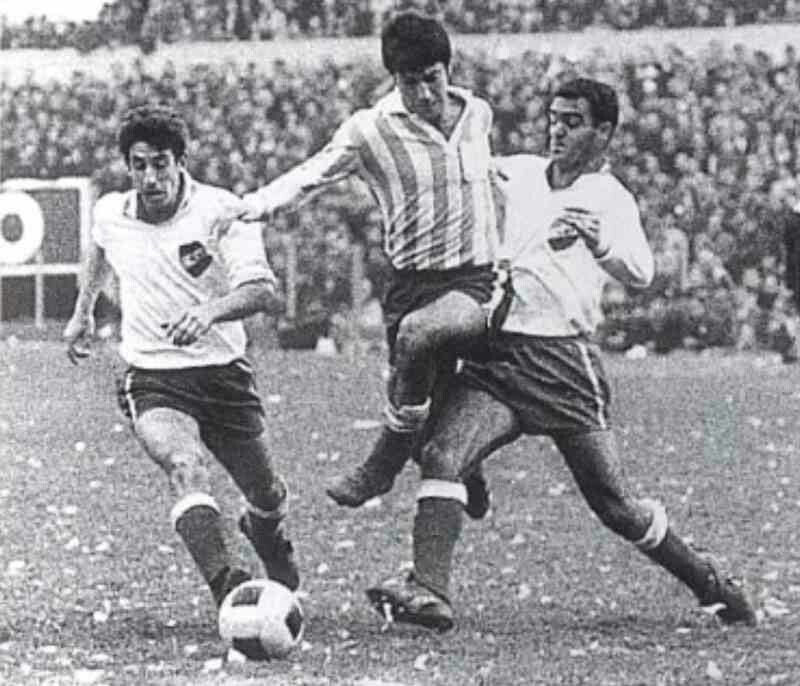
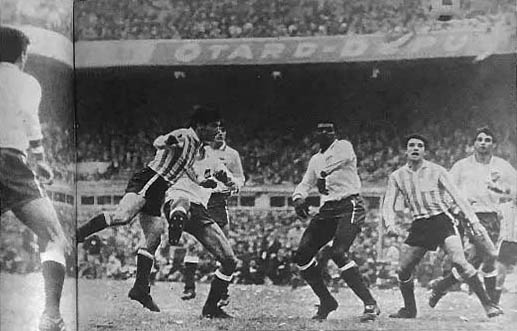
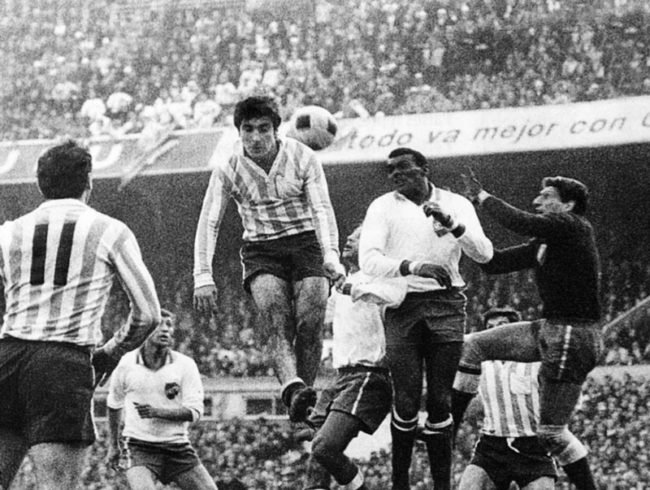
Some moments of the match held in Avellaneda
15 August 1967

Racing (Argentina)	0–0	(Uruguay) Nacional

El Cilindro, Avellaneda
Attendance: 99,148
Referee: César Orozco (Peru)

**Racing**	**Nacional**

GK	1	(Argentina) Agustín Cejas
DF	4	(Argentina) Oscar Martín
DF	2	(Argentina) Roberto Perfumo
DF	6	(Argentina) Alfio Basile
DF	3	(Argentina) Rubén Díaz
MF	8	(Argentina) Juan Carlos Rulli
MF	5	(Argentina) Miguel Mori
MF	10	(Argentina) Juan José Rodríguez
MF	11	(Italy) Humberto Maschio
FW	7	(Argentina) Jaime Martinoli
FW	9	(Argentina) Norberto Raffo
Manager:
(Argentina) Juan José Pizutti

GK	1	(Argentina) Rogelio Domínguez
DF	4	(Uruguay) Luis Ubiña
DF	2	(Uruguay) Jorge Manicera
DF	3	(Uruguay) Emilio Alvarez
DF	6	(Uruguay) Juan Mujica
MF	8	(Uruguay) Milton Viera
MF	5	(Uruguay) Julio Montero Castillo
MF	7	(Uruguay) Víctor Espárrago
FW	10	(Argentina) Rubén H. Sosa
FW	9	(Brazil) Célio
FW	11	(Uruguay) José Urruzmendi
Manager:
(Uruguay) Washington Etchamendi

=== Second leg ===
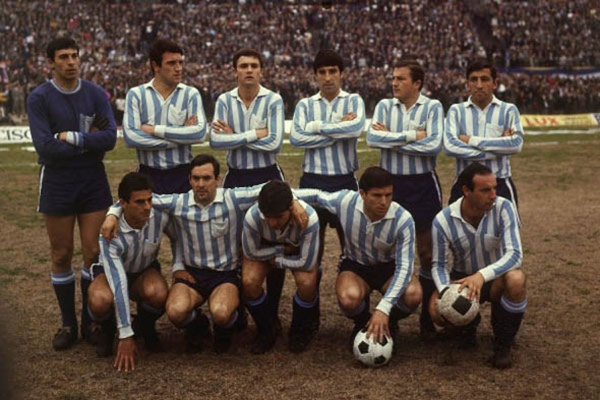
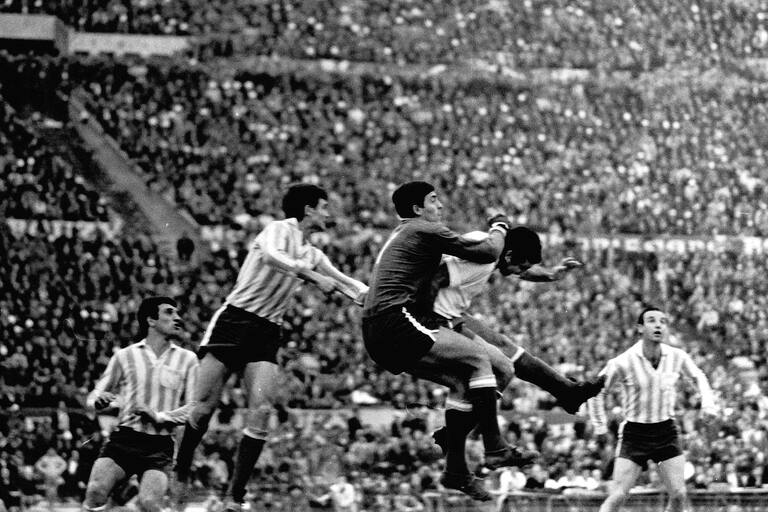
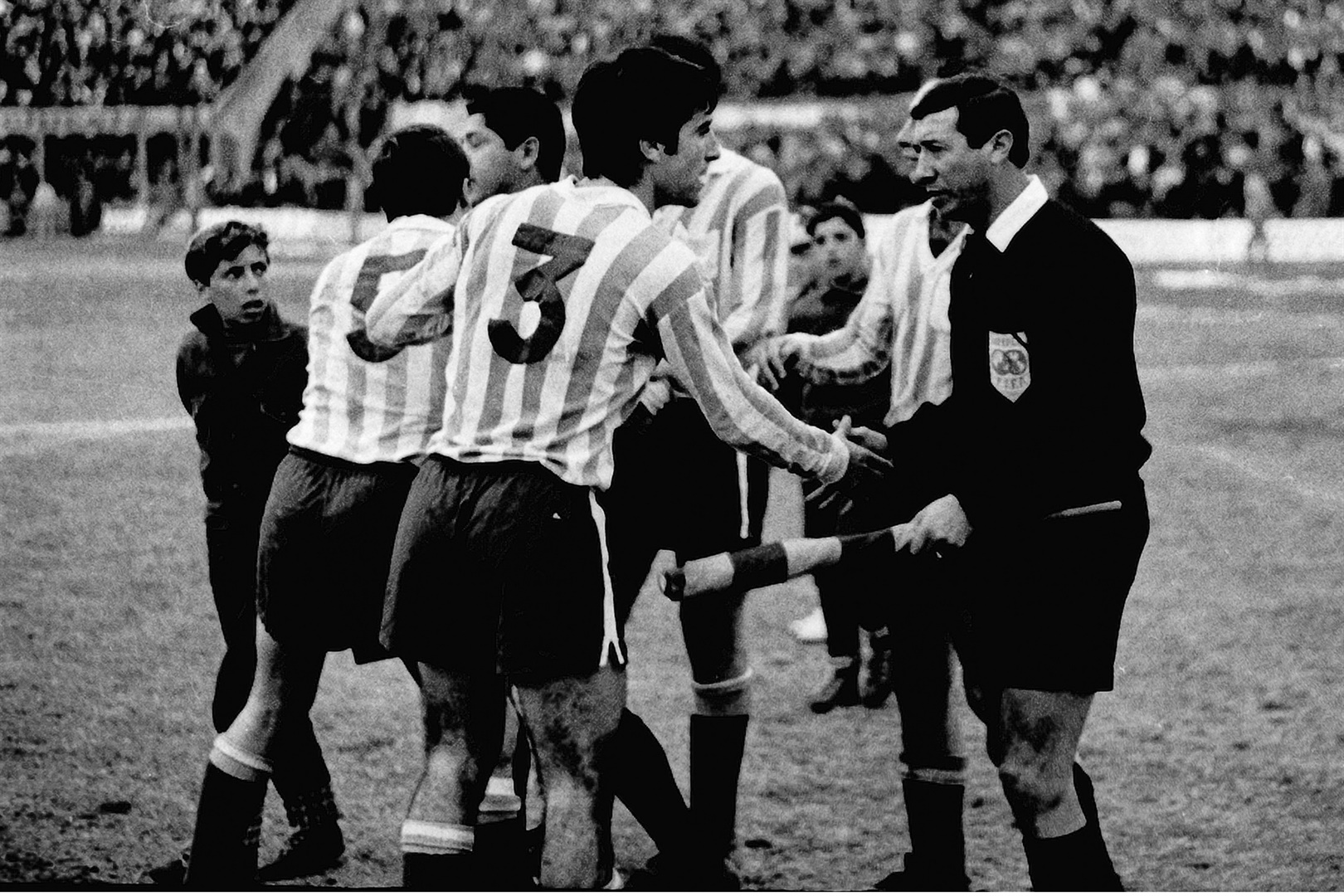
Some moments of the match held in Montevideo
25 August 1967

Nacional (Uruguay)	0–0	(Argentina) Racing

Estadio Centenario, Montevideo
Attendance: 60,000
Referee: César Orozco (Peru)

**Nacional**	**Racing**

GK	**1**	(Argentina) Rogelio Domínguez
DF		(Uruguay) Jorge Manicera
DF		(Uruguay) Emilio Alvarez
DF		(Uruguay) Luis Ubiña
MF		(Uruguay) Julio Montero Castillo
DF		(Uruguay) Juan Mujica
MF		(Uruguay) Víctor Espárrago
MF		(Uruguay) Milton Viera
FW	**9**	(Brazil) Célio
FW		(Argentina) Rubén H. Sosa
FW		(Uruguay) José Urruzmendi
Manager:
(Uruguay) Washington Etchamendi

GK	1	(Argentina) Agustín Cejas
DF	4	(Argentina) Oscar Martín
DF	2	(Argentina) Roberto Perfumo
DF	6	(Argentina) Alfio Basile
DF	3	(Argentina) Rubén Díaz
MF	8	(Argentina) Juan Carlos Rulli
MF	5	(Argentina) Miguel Mori
MF	7	(Brazil) João Cardoso
MF	11	(Italy) Humberto Maschio
FW	9	(Argentina) Juan Carlos Cárdenas
FW	10	(Argentina) Norberto Raffo
Manager:
(Argentina) Juan José Pizutti

=== Playoff ===
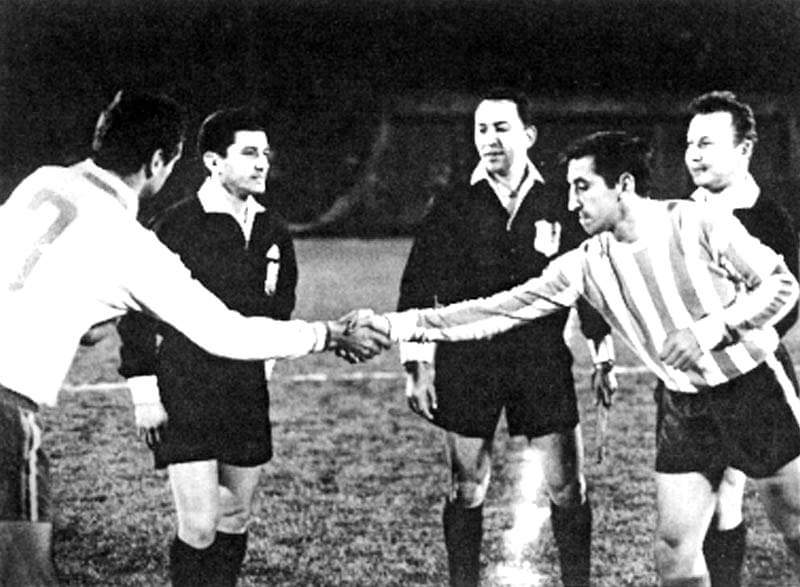
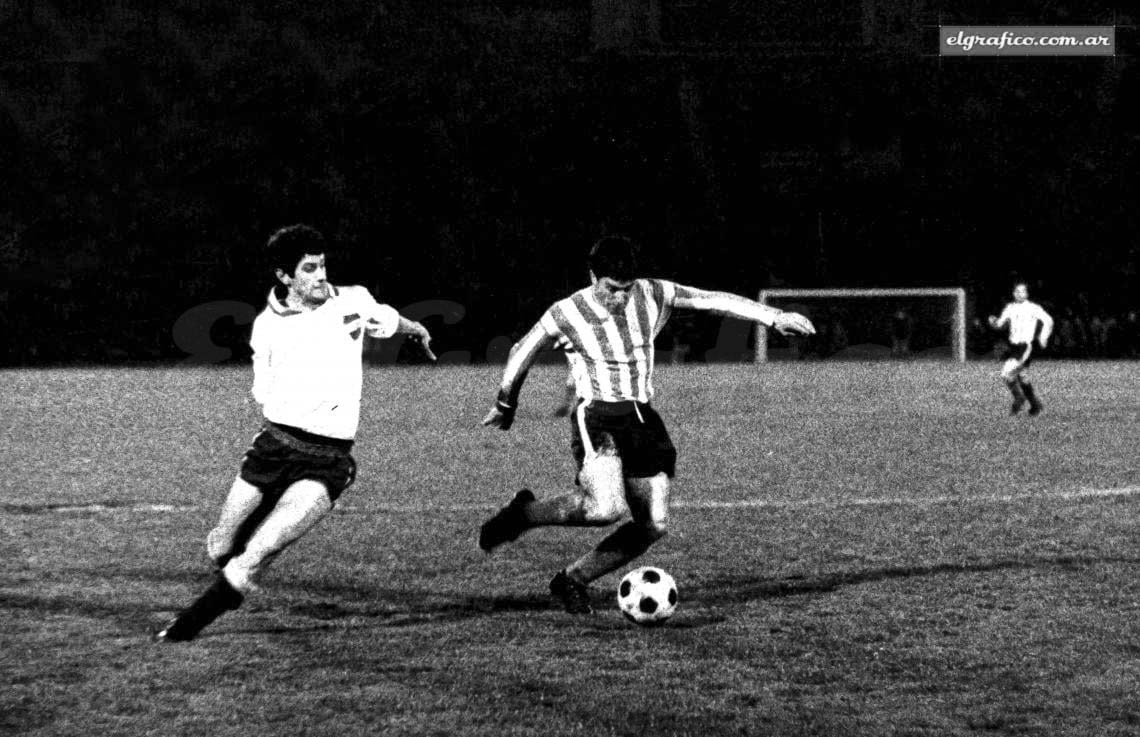
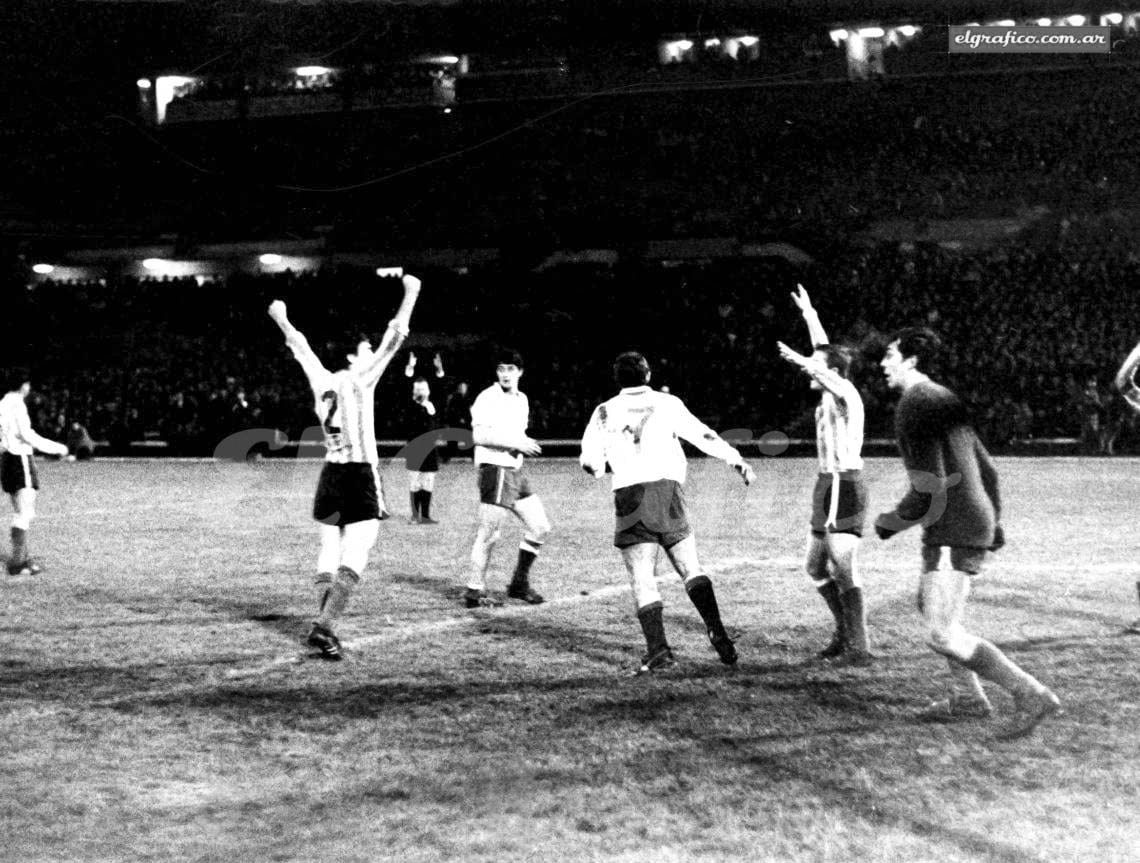
Some moments of the playoff in Santiago, fltr: Both captains greeting, Raffo scoring, and players of Racing celebration in the final
29 August 1967

Racing (Argentina)	2–1	(Uruguay) Nacional
Cardoso 14'; Raffo 43'		Viera 79'

Estadio Nacional, Santiago
Attendance: 50,000
Referee: Rodolfo Pérez Osorio (Paraguay)

**Racing**	**Nacional**

GK	1	(Argentina) Agustín Cejas
DF	4	(Argentina) Oscar Martín
DF	2	(Argentina) Roberto Perfumo
DF	6	(Argentina) Alfio Basile
DF	3	(Argentina) Rubén Díaz
MF	8	(Argentina) Juan Carlos Rulli
MF	5	(Argentina) Miguel Mori
MF	7	(Brazil) João Cardoso (substituted off)
MF	11	(Italy) Humberto Maschio
FW	9	(Argentina) Juan Carlos Cárdenas
FW	10	(Argentina) Norberto Raffo
Substitutes:
MF		(Argentina) Fernando Parenti	Substituted on
Manager:
(Argentina) Juan José Pizutti

GK	**1**	(Argentina) Rogelio Domínguez
DF		(Uruguay) Jorge Manicera
DF		(Uruguay) Emilio Alvarez
DF		(Uruguay) Luis Ubiña
MF		(Uruguay) Julio Montero Castillo
DF		(Uruguay) Juan Mujica
MF		(Uruguay) José Urruzmendi
MF		(Uruguay) Milton Viera
FW	**9**	(Brazil) Célio
FW		(Uruguay) Víctor Espárrago
FW		(Uruguay) Julio C. Morales (substituted off)
Substitutes:
FW		(Uruguay) Jorge Oyarbide	Substituted on
Manager:
(Uruguay) Washington Etchemandi
