= 1964 Campeonato Ecuatoriano de Fútbol =

Campeonato Ecuatoriano de Fútbol
- Season: 1964
- Champions: Deportivo Quito (1st title)
- Copa Libertadores: Deportivo Quito
- Matches played: 31
- Goals scored: 87 (2.81 per match)
- Top goalscorer: Jorge Valencia (8 goals)
- Biggest home win: Deportivo Quito 5–2 América de Manta, El Nacional 4–1 Juventud Italiana
- Biggest away win: Macará 0–2 Deportivo Quito; El Nacional 0–2 Deportivo Quito
- Highest scoring: Deportivo Quito 5–2 América de Manta

The 1964 Campeonato Ecuatoriano de Fútbol (English: Ecuadorian Football Championship) was the 6th national championship for football teams in Ecuador. Deportivo Quito won their first national title, becoming the first club from the capital city to win. They qualified to the 1965 Copa Libertadores.

== Qualified teams ==
The number of teams remained the same at eight. The qualified teams included the top-four finishers from the Campeonato Interandino, two teams from Manabí, and two from Tungurahua. América de Ambato, América de Manta, El Nacional, and Juventud Italiana made their first appearance in the national tournament. Teams from Guayaquil declined to participate.

Competition	Team	Qualification method
Interandino; 2 berths	Politécnico	1964 Interandino champion
Interandino; 2 berths	LDU Quito	1964 Interandino runner-up
Interandino; 2 berths	El Nacional	1964 Interandino 3rd place
Interandino; 2 berths	Deportivo Quito	1964 Interandino 4th place
Manabí; 2 berth	América de Manta	
Manabí; 2 berth	Juventud Italiana	
Tungurahua; 2 berths	América de Ambato	
Tungurahua; 2 berths	Macará	

== Standings ==
Pos	Team	Pld	W	D	L	GF	GA	GD	Pts	Qualification or relegation
1	Deportivo Quito	7	4	2	1	13	6	+7	10	Championship Playoff
2	El Nacional	7	4	2	1	11	7	+4	10	Championship Playoff
3	LDU Quito	7	4	2	1	10	7	+3	10	Championship Playoff
4	América de Manta	7	3	3	1	10	9	+1	9	
5	Juventud Italiana	7	2	3	2	9	10	−1	7	
6	Politécnico	7	1	3	3	8	9	−1	5	
7	Macará	7	2	0	5	9	14	−5	4	
8	América de Ambato	7	0	1	6	10	18	−8	1	

Rules for classification: 1st points.

== Results ==
Home \ Away	AMA	AMM	QUI	NAC	JUV	LDQ	MAC	POL
América de Ambato		1–2		1–2	1–2	3–3		
América de Manta				1–1		0–0	3–1	2–1
Deportivo Quito	3–2	5–2						1–1
El Nacional			0–2		4–1	1–0		
Juventud Italiana		0–0	0–0				3–1	1–1
LDU Quito			1–0		3–2		2–1	
Macará	3–1		0–2	1–2				2–1
Politécnico	3–1			1–1		0–1		

Legend: Blue = home team win; Yellow = draw; Red = away team win.

== Playoff ==
Since points was the sole deciding factor in determining the champion, Deportivo Quito, El Nacional, and LDU Quito went to a playoff. The matches took place the following year in 1965.

=== Standings ===
Pos	Team	Pld	W	D	L	GF	GA	GD	Pts	Qualification or relegation
1	Deportivo Quito	2	2	0	0	2	0	+2	4	1965 Copa Libertadores
2	El Nacional	2	1	0	1	3	3	0	2	
3	LDU Quito	2	0	0	2	2	4	−2	0	

Rules for classification: 1st points.

Campeonato Ecuatoriano de Fútbol
1964 champion
Deportivo Quito
1st title

=== Results ===
January 14, 1965

Deportivo Quito	1–0	LDU Quito

Estadio Olímpico Municipal, Quito

January 17, 1965

Deportivo Quito	1–0	El Nacional

Estadio Olímpico Municipal, Quito

January 20, 1965

El Nacional	3–2	LDU Quito

Estadio Olímpico Municipal, Quito
