= John Fallon (footballer) =

Scottish footballer (1940–2025)

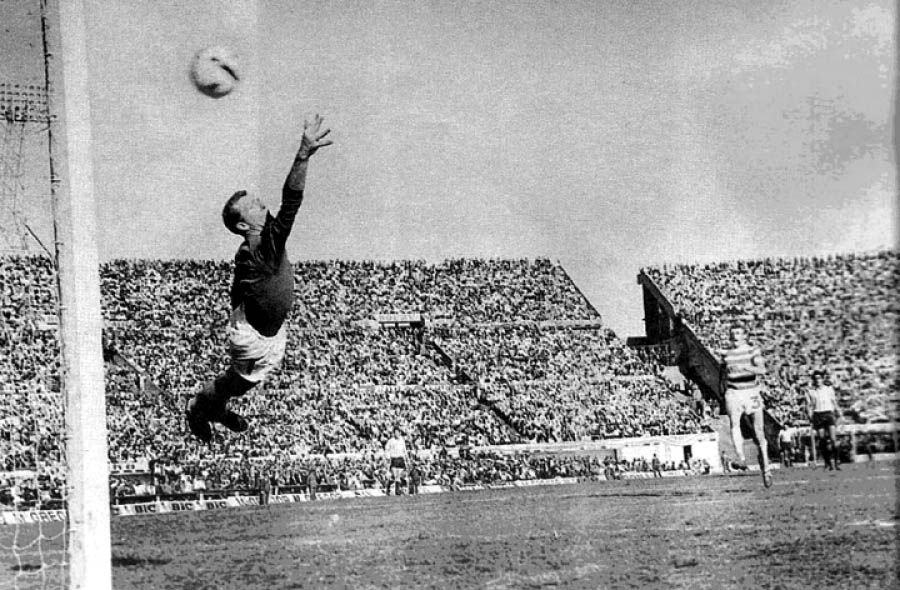
- Fallon dives to try to save Cárdenas' (Racing Club) goal in the 1967 Intercontinental Cup playoff match.

Personal information
- Date of birth: 16 August 1940
- Place of birth: Cambuslang, Scotland
- Date of death: 22 July 2025 (aged 84)
- Height: 1.80 m (5 ft 11 in)
- Position: Goalkeeper

Youth career
- Halfway Boys Guild
- 1958: Fauldhouse United
- 1958–1959: Celtic

Senior career*
Years	Team	Apps	(Gls)
1959–1971	Celtic	114	(0)
1971–1972	Motherwell	10	(0)
1972–1973	Morton	0	(0)
Total		124	(0)
- * Club domestic league appearances and goals

John Fallon (16 August 1940 – 22 July 2025) was a Scottish professional football goalkeeper and member of the Celtic squad that won the European Cup in 1967, which came to be known as the Lisbon Lions.

== Career ==
Fallon signed for Celtic, the team he supported in childhood, from junior team Fauldhouse United in December 1958 to understudy for Frank Haffey and made his debut in September 1959 against Clyde. He replaced Haffey as first choice goalkeeper in 1963 and played his part in the Cup Winners' Cup run of 1964, where they lost out to the Hungarian team MTK Budapest 4–3 in the semi-finals, after holding a 3–0 lead from the first leg at Celtic Park. He remained first choice goalkeeper until the signing of veteran Ronnie Simpson from Hibernian in 1965.

Fallon became the only Lisbon Lion not to play in Celtic's win in the 1967 European Cup Final against Inter Milan, as he was the (unused) substitute goalkeeper. At that time the only substitute permitted was for the goalkeeping position.

He was presented with a winner's medal by captain Billy McNeill at a post-match dinner, but then had it taken from him in suspicious circumstances. According to his autobiography, Keeping in Paradise (2015), manager Jock Stein asked Fallon for his medal back. Fallon was then presented with a replica, while the real medal ended up with Celtic's chairman, Sir Robert Kelly.

As a result of winning the European Cup, Celtic entered the Intercontinental Cup later that year, a two-leg match against Racing Club of Argentina. While warming up for the second leg, a brick (Robert Kelly said in his book, Celtic that it was a "flat iron bar") thrown or catapulted by a member of the crowd, struck Ronnie Simpson on the head. With Simpson unable to play, Fallon was called on to keep goal in a bad-tempered second leg, and an even more bad-tempered play-off. Although Celtic lost the return leg, and the subsequent play-off in Montevideo, amid accusations of extreme foul play from the Racing players, Fallon distinguished himself with a string of saves which caused one commentator to remark: "If that's the reserve keeper, what must the other guy be like?"

According to Kelly, when Celtic tried to get the second leg declared void because of the Simpson incident, Racing Club used Fallon's heroic performance as their counter argument, and the result stood. Fallon also played in the team that won the Alfredo di Stefano Trophy, a testimonial for the Real Madrid player.

After Simpson's retirement, Fallon took over as first choice at Celtic. He lost his place to Evan Williams due to a long illness, sitting out the 1970 European Cup Final. He left the club in 1971 and subsequently played for Motherwell and Morton before retiring from senior football. He later owned a pub in Blantyre, where he had lived for many years.

== Later life and death ==
In May 2019, Fallon was reunited with his European Cup winner's medal after an "eagle-eyed good samaritan" spotted it and returned the medal to Celtic. "It feels great to be reunited with my medal, and I've got to thank [Celtic chairman] Peter Lawwell and everyone at Celtic for going to all this effort and finding the medal that was lost," Fallon told Celtic TV. "I did get a replica one at one point, but it didn't seem the same." Fallon died on 22 July 2025, at the age of 84.
