= 1966 Campeonato Ecuatoriano de Fútbol =

Campeonato Ecuatoriano de Fútbol
- Season: 1966
- Champions: Barcelona (3rd title)
- Copa Libertadores: Barcelona; Emelec
- Top goalscorer: Coutinho (13 goals)
- Biggest home win: América de Quito 8–0 Macará
- Biggest away win: 9 de Octubre 0–4 Emelec; River Plate de Manta 0–4 Barcelona; Aucas 1–5 LDU Quito
- Highest scoring: LDU Quito 5–4 Politécnico

The 1966 Campeonato Ecuatoriano de Fútbol (English: Ecuadorian Football Championship) was the 8th national championship for football teams in Ecuador. Barcelona won their third national title. They qualified to the 1967 Copa Libertadores along with Emelec.

== Qualified teams ==
The number of teams expanded to sixteen. The qualified teams included the top-eight finishers from the Campeonato Interandino and the Campeonato de Guayaquil.

Competition	Team	Qualification method
Guayaquil; 8 berths	Emelec	1966 Guayaquil champion
Guayaquil; 8 berths	Barcelona	1966 Guayaquil runner-up
Guayaquil; 8 berths	9 de Octubre	1966 Guayaquil top-eight finishers
Guayaquil; 8 berths	América de Manta	1966 Guayaquil top-eight finishers
Guayaquil; 8 berths	Español	1966 Guayaquil top-eight finishers
Guayaquil; 8 berths	Norte América	1966 Guayaquil top-eight finishers
Guayaquil; 8 berths	Patria	1966 Guayaquil top-eight finishers
Guayaquil; 8 berths	River Plate de Manta	1966 Guayaquil top-eight finishers
Interandino; 8 berths	LDU Quito	1966 Interandino champion
Interandino; 8 berths	América de Quito	1966 Interandino runner-up
Interandino; 8 berths	América de Ambato	1966 Interandino top-eight finishers
Interandino; 8 berths	Aucas	1966 Interandino top-eight finishers
Interandino; 8 berths	El Nacional	1966 Interandino top-eight finishers
Interandino; 8 berths	Macará	1966 Interandino top-eight finishers
Interandino; 8 berths	Politécnico	1966 Interandino top-eight finishers
Interandino; 8 berths	Universidad Católica	1966 Interandino top-eight finishers

== First stage ==
=== Sierra ===
==== Group A ====
===== Standings =====
Pos	Team	Pld	W	D	L	GF	GA	GD	Pts	Qualification or relegation
1	LDU Quito	6	5	1	0	16	5	+11	11	Advanced to the Final Stage
2	El Nacional	6	4	1	1	15	8	+7	9	Advanced to the Final Stage
3	Universidad Católica	6	2	0	4	11	15	−4	4	
4	América de Ambato	6	0	0	6	8	22	−14	0	

===== Results =====
Home \ Away	AMA	NAC	LDQ	CAT
América de Ambato		3–5	1–3	3–4
El Nacional	2–0		2–2	4–1
LDU Quito	4–1	1–0		3–1
Universidad Católica	4–0	1–2	0–3	

Legend: Blue = home team win; Yellow = draw; Red = away team win.

==== Group B ====
===== Standings =====
Pos	Team	Pld	W	D	L	GF	GA	GD	Pts	Qualification or relegation
1	Politécnico	6	2	3	1	8	7	+1	7	Advanced to the Final Stage
2	Aucas	6	2	2	2	6	5	+1	6	Advanced to the Final Stage
3	América de Quito	6	1	4	1	10	4	+6	6	
4	Macará	6	2	1	3	7	15	−8	5	

===== Results =====
Home \ Away	AMQ	AUC	MAC	POL
América de Quito		0–2	8–0	2–2
Aucas	0–0		0–1	2–1
Macará	0–0	3–2		2–3
Politécnico	0–0	0–0	2–1	

Legend: Blue = home team win; Yellow = draw; Red = away team win.

=== Costa ===
==== Group A ====
===== Standings =====
Pos	Team	Pld	W	D	L	GF	GA	GD	Pts	Qualification or relegation
1	Patria	6	4	0	2	7	4	+3	8	Advanced to the Final Stage
2	Emelec	6	3	0	3	11	5	+6	6	Advanced to the Final Stage
3	9 de Octubre	6	3	0	3	5	8	−3	6	
4	América de Manta	6	2	0	4	5	11	−6	4	

===== Results =====
Home \ Away	9OC	AMM	EME	PAT
9 de Octubre		2–0	0–4	0–2
América de Manta	2–1		3–1	0–1
Emelec	0–1	3–0		0–1
Patria	0–1	3–0	0–3	

Legend: Blue = home team win; Yellow = draw; Red = away team win.

==== Group B ====
===== Standings =====
Pos	Team	Pld	W	D	L	GF	GA	GD	Pts	Qualification or relegation
1	Barcelona	6	5	1	0	16	5	+11	11	Advanced to the Final Stage
2	Español	6	3	1	2	9	6	+3	7	Advanced to the Final Stage
3	River Plate de Manta	6	2	0	4	10	15	−5	4	
4	Norte América	6	1	0	5	6	15	−9	2	

===== Results =====
Home \ Away	BAR	ESP	NAM	RPM
Barcelona		1–0	3–0	3–2
Español	0–0		3–0	4–2
Norte América	3–5	0–1		2–1
River Plate de Manta	0–4	3–1	2–1	

Legend: Blue = home team win; Yellow = draw; Red = away team win.

== Final stage ==
=== Standings ===
Pos	Team	Pld	W	D	L	GF	GA	GD	Pts	Qualification or relegation
1	Barcelona	14	8	5	1	23	10	+13	21	1967 Copa Libertadores
2	Emelec	14	9	2	3	27	13	+14	20	1967 Copa Libertadores
3	Politécnico	14	7	2	5	27	26	+1	16	
4	LDU Quito	14	6	3	5	29	25	+4	15	
5	Patria	14	6	2	6	19	20	−1	14	
6	El Nacional	14	4	6	4	15	16	−1	14	
7	Aucas	14	1	5	8	13	28	−15	7	
8	Español	14	2	1	11	20	35	−15	5	

Campeonato Ecuatoriano de Fútbol
1965 champion

3rd title
