= C.S. Norte América =

Ecuadorian football club

Norte América
- Full name: Club Sport Norte América
- Nickname(s): Norte (North); Nortinos (The Northerns)
- Founded: July 4, 1916; 108 years ago
- Ground: Alejandro Ponce Noboa, Guayaquil
- Capacity: 3,500
- President: Alex Germán Anchundia
- League: Segunda Categoría
- 2016: 4th, Group 1
Home colours	Away colours

Club Sport Norte América, known as Norte América or Norteamérica, is an Ecuadorian football club based in Guayaquil. Founded in 1916, it plays in the Segunda Categoría, the country's third division.

Well-known for its successful youth setup, Norte América played three seasons in Serie A (1966, 1969 and 1971) aside from one Serie B in 1971.

== Honours ==
- Segunda Categoría (Guayas)
  - Champions (6): 1968, 1970, 1970, 1980, 1989, 2015
