= Oscar Martín (footballer, born 1934) =

Argentine footballer

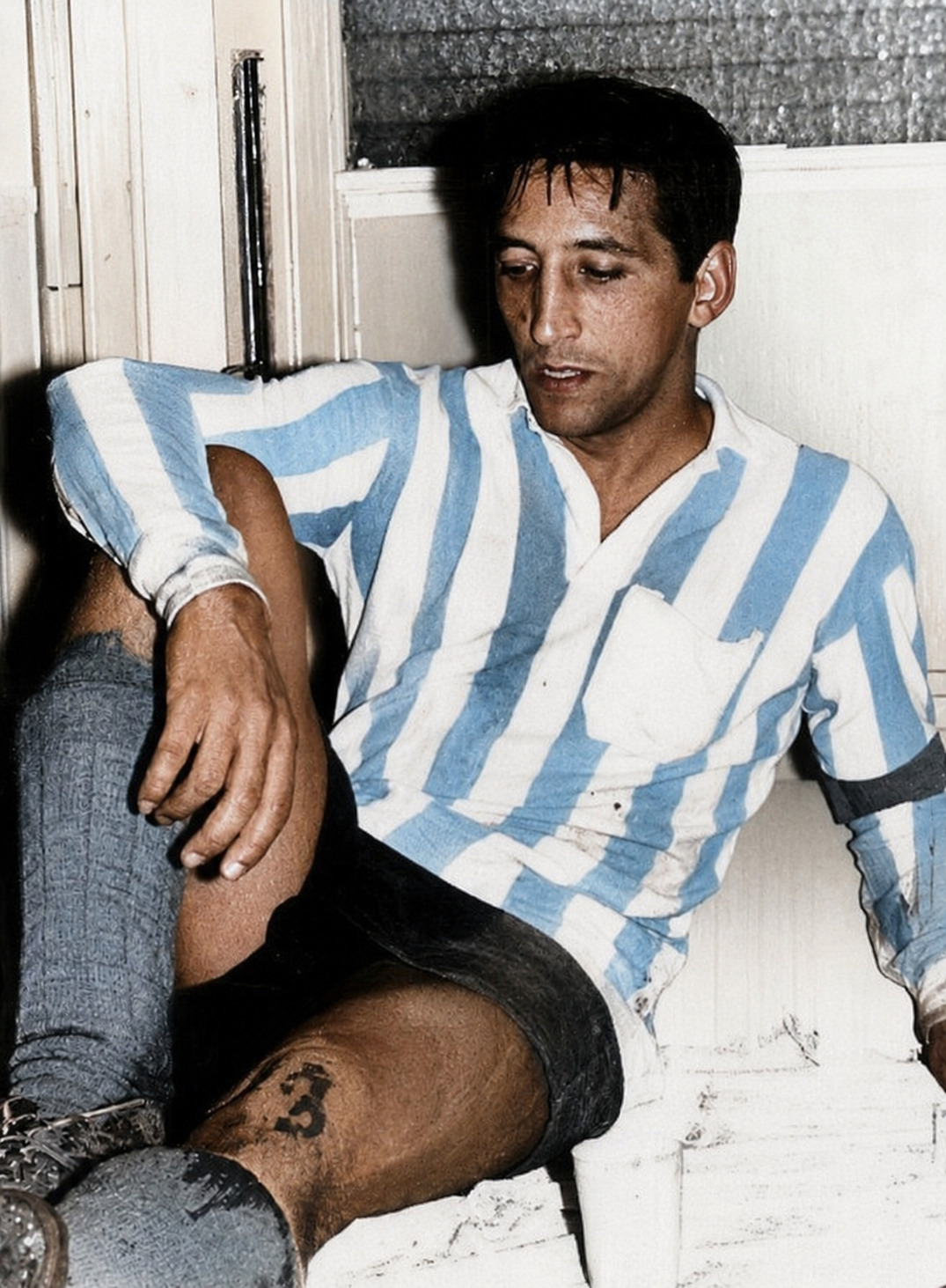

Personal information
- Full name: Oscar Raimundo Martín
- Date of birth: 23 June 1934
- Place of birth: Buenos Aires, Argentina
- Date of death: 12 February 2018 (aged 83)
- Place of death: Buenos Aires, Argentina
- Position: Right back

Youth career
- Argentinos

Senior career*
Years	Team	Apps	(Gls)
1952–1958	Argentinos	26	(0)
1959–1963	Chacarita	80	(1)
1963–1967	Racing	151	(0)

International career
1963	Argentina	8	(0)
- * Club domestic league appearances and goals

Oscar Raimundo Martín (23 June 1934 in Buenos Aires - 12 February 2018) was an Argentine footballer.

== Club career ==
Oscar Martín started his career at Argentinos Juniors in 1953. In 1959 he moved to the second league club Chacarita Juniors, who helped get promoted to the Primera División.

In 1963 he moved to Racing Club de Avellaneda. With Racing, he won the Argentine Championship in 1966 and the Copa Libertadores in 1967 (Martín played in all three final matches with Nacional Montevideo, in which he served as captain). He also captained Racing to victory in the Intercontinental Cup, again playing in all three matches against Scottish club Celtic.

In total, he played 257 matches in the league between 1953 and 1967 for his three clubs, scoring once.

== International career ==
Oscar Martín made his international debut for Argentina on 10 March 1963 in a 4–2 win against Colombia in the South American Championship held in Bolivia. He played in all six matches for his country at the tournament, helping them to third place. His last appearance for the national team was on 16 April 1963 in a 5–2 defeat against Brazil in the Roca Cup. In total, he appeared in 8 matches for Argentina.

Martín died on 12 February 2018.
