= Agustín Cejas =

Argentine footballer

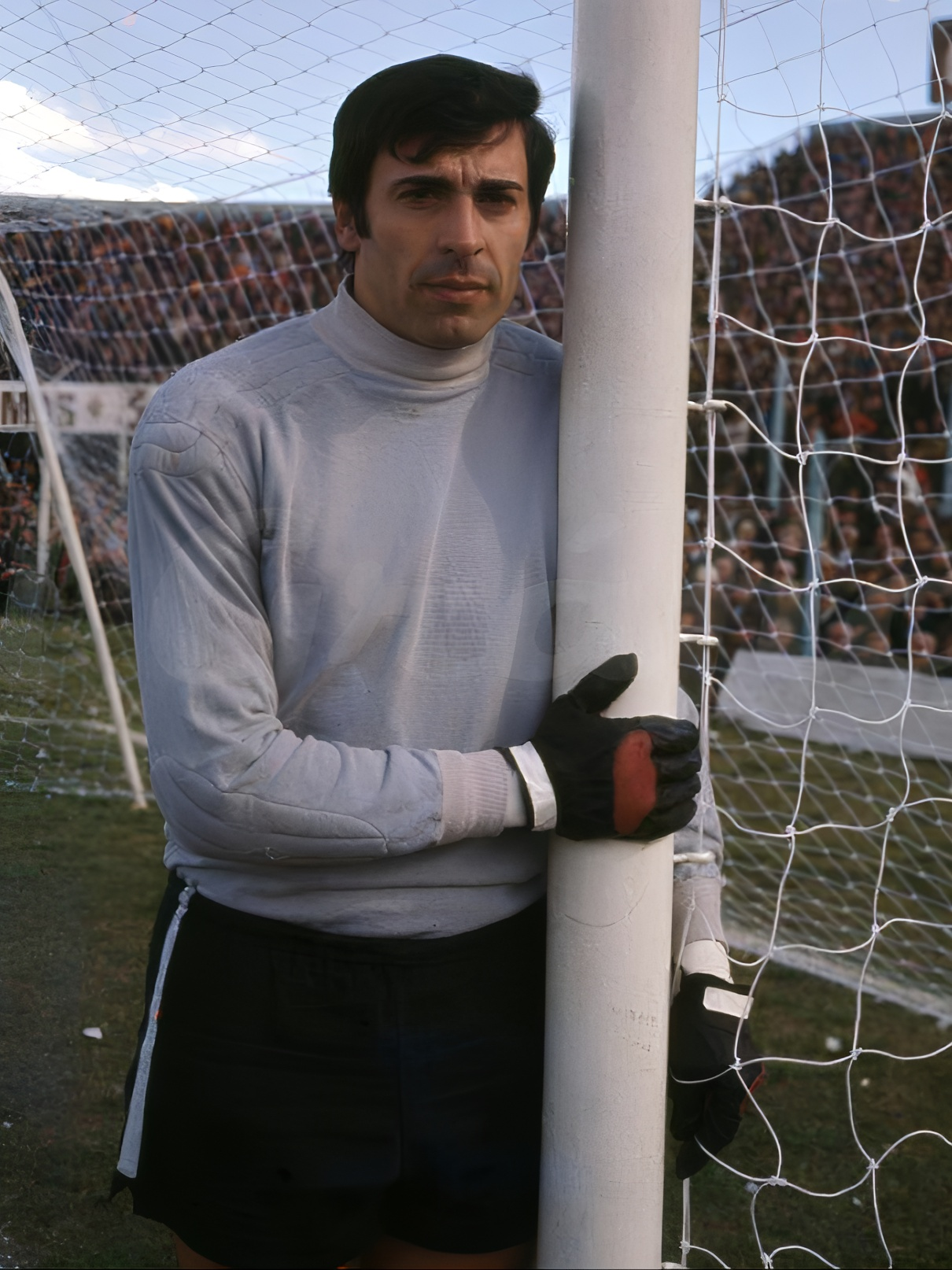
- Cejas in 1970.

Personal information
- Full name: Agustín Mario Cejas
- Date of birth: 22 March 1945
- Place of birth: Buenos Aires, Argentina
- Date of death: 14 August 2015 (aged 70)
- Place of death: Buenos Aires, Argentina
- Position: Goalkeeper

Youth career
- 1959–1962: Racing Club

Senior career*
Years	Team	Apps	(Gls)
1962–1969	Racing Club	313	(0)
1970–1975	Santos	?	(?)
1975	Huracán	50	(0)
1975–1976	Grêmio	?	(?)
1977–1980	Racing Club	(see above)	
1981	River Plate	9	(0)

International career
1963–1964	Argentina	6	(0)
- * Club domestic league appearances and goals as of October 2007

Agustín Mario Cejas (22 March 1945 – 14 August 2015) was an Argentine football goalkeeper. He played for a number of clubs in Argentina and Brazil and has the all-time record number of appearances for Racing Club de Avellaneda.

Cejas joined the Racing Club youth team in 1959 at the age of 13. He made his first team debut in 1962 at the age of 17. In 1966, he helped Racing Club to win the Argentine Primera. The following year Racing won the Copa Libertadores 1967 to become Libertadores champions of South America for the only time in the club's history. They followed this up by beating Celtic F.C. in the Copa Intercontinental to become the first Argentine club champions of the world.

In 1970, Cejas joined Santos in Brazil where he played in the same team as Pelé. In 1973, Cejas helped Santos to win the Campeonato Paulista and received the prestigious Bola de Ouro as the best player in Brazil.

Cejas returned to Argentina in 1975 for a brief spell with Club Atlético Huracán before going back to Brazil to join Grêmio.

In 1977, Cejas returned to Racing Club where he played until 1980. By the end of his second period with the club he had set a club record of 313 appearances. He then had a short spell with River Plate where he was part of the squad that won the Nacional in 1981.

Cejas played for Argentina at the 1964 Summer Olympics.

Agustín Cejas died of Alzheimer's disease on 14 August 2015.

== Titles ==
Racing Club de Avellaneda|Racing Club

- Argentine Primera División: 1966
- Copa Libertadores: 1967
- Copa Intercontinental: 1967
- Intercontinental Champions' Supercup runner-up: 1969

Santos FC|Santos

- Campeonato Paulista: 1973

River Plate

- Argentine Primera División: 1981 Nacional

Argentina Youth

- CONMEBOL Pre-Olympic Tournament: 1964
