= Deportivo Quito =

Association football club in Ecuador

- Full name: Club Sociedad Deportivo Quito
- Nicknames: Los Chullas quiteños La Academia (The Academy); Los Azulgranas (The Blue and Dark Reds); El Equipo de la Plaza del Teatro (The Team from the Plaza del Teatro)
- Founded: July 9, 1940; 86 years ago, as Sociedad Deportiva Argentina
- Ground: Estadio Ney Mancheno
- Capacity: 1,500
- Chairman: José Antonio Pardo
- Manager: Sebastián Blázquez
| Home colours | Away colours | Third colours |

Club Sociedad Deportivo Quito is an Ecuadorian football club based in Quito. For most of its existence, it competed in Serie A, the highest level of the Ecuadorian professional football league. It currently competes in the Second Category of Pichincha.

Deportivo Quito has won five Serie A titles in 1964, 1968, 2008, 2009, and 2011. This places them fifth overall. The club also has four Interandean Tournament titles in 1955, 1956, 1957, and 1963. Additionally, the club was runner up in 1985, 1988, and 1997. Based on its style of play, sports journalists and fans nicknamed the club La Academia de los Ecuatorianos desde 1940 (English: The Academy of the Ecuadorians since 1940).

Deportivo Quito was officially founded in 1955, although they trace their roots to Sociedad Deportiva Argentina, which was founded on 9 July 1940. Historic rivals include LDU Quito, Aucas, El Nacional, and Universidad Católica. They play their home games at the 1,500-capacity Estadio Ney Mancheno.

== History ==
The club was founded on 9 July 1940, under the name Sociedad Deportiva Argentina. On 1 October 1954, the club, together with Sociedad Deportiva Aucas & Sociedad Deportiva España, founded Asociación de Fútbol No Amateur (AFNA) de Pichincha (Spanish for Non-Amateur Football Association of Pichincha). This was followed by provincial professional soccer tournaments. In accordance with AFNA bylaws, which stipulated that no team could be named after a country (except after Spain), the shareholders of Argentina got together and changed the club's name to Sociedad Deportivo Quito.

The 1950s and 1960s were fruitful decades for Deportivo Quito with the club obtaining National Championship titles in 1964 and 1968 as well as Interandean Championships (named so for inclusion of teams from both Quito and Ambato) in 1955, 1956, 1957 and 1963. The 1970s were a dark period for the club, which descended and spent several seasons in the second tier Serie B of the Ecuadorian Football League. The 1980s and 1990s brought a return measure of success for the club which came in as runners up in 1985, 1988, 1997 and qualified to participate in Copa Libertadores. 1989 also saw the transfer of one of the brightest players in Ecuadorian soccer history, Álex Aguinaga to Necaxa of Mexico.

The club would wait forty years for its third championship and after a brilliant campaign in 2008, which saw Deportivo Quito in the lead throughout the tournament, the team sealed its third star against Macará of Ambato. 2009 began fraught with problems for the club. Although it was able to hold on to its star player Luis Saritama on loan, economic problems dogged the club throughout the year. As a result, early tournament action saw the club mired in the middle half of the table. The next two phases of the tournament were a different story as the defense, solidified with the incorporation of the Ecuador National team captain Ivan Hurtado, led the club to top of the table finishes. This set up the final play-off against Deportivo Cuenca. Following a 1–1 tie in Cuenca, the two teams played an exciting game in Quito which saw back and forth action ending 3–2 in favor of Deportivo Quito. The team's fourth star was not nearly as elusive as the third. In the 2010 season Deportivo Quito earned a third-place finish after surpassing Barcelona SC in a home and home play-off. 2011 saw a dominating performance from Deportivo Quito, in which they won 26 games, tied 11 and only lost 9. Following 1–0 victories over Emelec in Quito and Guayaquil, Deportivo Quito earned its fifth star. Fans celebrated the long-awaited 2008 as well as the follow-up 2009 and 2011 championships in the popular Plaza del Teatro in Quito.

== Stadium ==
Deportivo Quito play their games at their training facility Ney Mancheno in 2021. Their home games were played in the Estadio Olímpico Atahualpa in the city of Quito until 2020. There have been plans to build a stadium for the year 2013 on their current training grounds Ney Mancheno in Carcelén.

On 13 November 2008, Deportivo Quito's management presented the model of the new stadium. This stadium will have a capacity of 20,000 people. The building project includes the construction of a shopping mall attached to the same stadium that will serve as a source of revenue for the institution. The plans were approved by the club socios on 29 April 2013.

== Honours ==
=== National ===
- Serie A
  - Winners (5): 1964, 1968, 2008, 2009, 2011
- Serie B
  - Winners (1): 1980 E1
- Segunda Categoría
  - Winners (1): 1967-S

=== Regional ===
- Campeonato Amateur de Pichincha
  - Winners (1): 1950
- Copa Pichincha
  - Winners (1): 2019
- Campeonato Professional Interandino
  - Champions (4): 1955, 1956, 1957, 1963
- Campeonato de Promoción de AFNA
  - Winners (1): 1967

== Players ==
Note: Flags indicate national team as defined under FIFA eligibility rules; some limited exceptions apply. Players may hold more than one non-FIFA nationality.

| No. | Pos. | Nation | Player |
|---|---|---|---|
| 1 | GK | ECU | Edwin Calderón |
| 2 | DF | ECU | Andrés Justicia |
| 3 | DF | ECU | Jesús Solís |
| 4 | DF | ECU | Fricson Macías |
| 6 | DF | ECU | Marlon Ganchozo |
| 7 | MF | ECU | Christian Alemán |
| 9 | FW | ECU | Diego Ávila |
| 10 | FW | ECU | Walter Iza |
| 12 | FW | ECU | César Moreira |
| 15 | DF | ECU | Santiago Morales |
| 16 | DF | ECU | Michael Castro |
| 16 | FW | ARG | Martín Comachi |
| 18 | FW | ECU | Carlos Bailón |
| 19 | FW | ECU | Ronnal Campos |
| 20 | DF | ECU | Juan Guerrón |
| 21 | MF | ECU | Roberto Valarezo |
| 22 | GK | ARG | Nelson Schonberger |

| No. | Pos. | Nation | Player |
|---|---|---|---|
| 23 | DF | ECU | Washington Mauret |
| 25 | MF | ECU | Manuel Quintero |
| 22 | FW | ARG | Marcelo Argüello |
| 27 | MF | ECU | Juan de Dios Lastre |
| 32 | GK | ECU | Carlos Espinoza |
| 33 | DF | ECU | Eddie Guevara |
| 52 | MF | ECU | Robert Angulo |
| — | DF | ECU | Fulton Francis |
| — | DF | ECU | Javier Hinostroza |
| — | DF | ECU | Wilson Morante |
| — | DF | ECU | Ridder Alcívar |
| — | DF | ECU | Milton Bolaños |
| — | MF | ECU | Elson Peñarrieta |
| — | MF | ECU | Jonathan Ávila |
| — | MF | ECU | Luis Mosquera |
| — | MF | ECU | Mario Barrionuevo |

=== World Cup players ===
The following players were chosen to represent their country at the FIFA World Cup while contracted to Deportivo Quito.

- (Ecuador) Raúl Guerrón (2002)
- (Ecuador) Édison Méndez (2002)
- (Ecuador) Marlon Ayoví (2002, 2006)
- (Ecuador) Edwin Villafuerte (2006)
- (Ecuador) Luis Fernando Saritama (2006)
