= Nelson Chabay =

Uruguayan footballer (1940-2018)

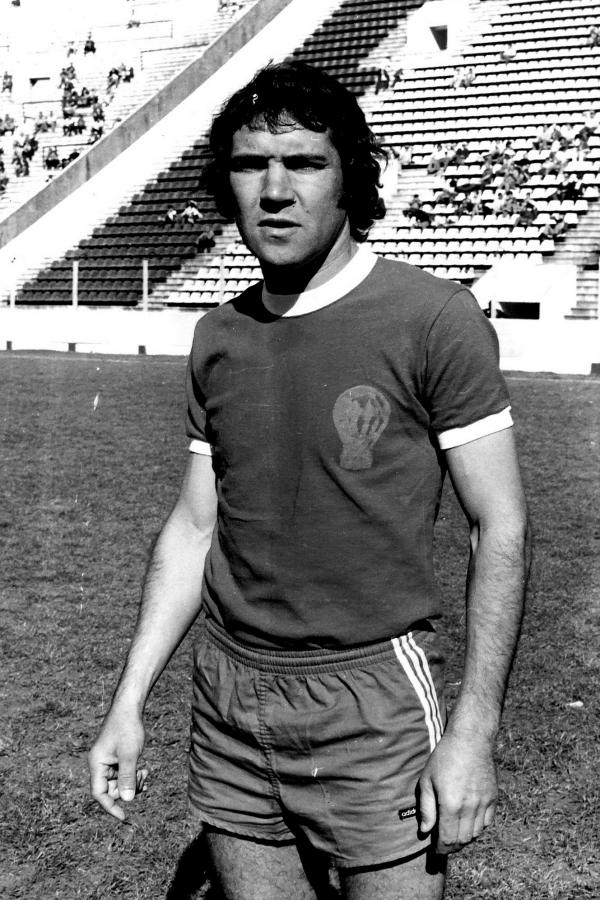
- Chabay in Huracán, c. 1973

Personal information
- Date of birth: 29 June 1940
- Place of birth: Montevideo, Uruguay
- Date of death: 2 November 2018 (aged 78)
- Place of death: Buenos Aires, Argentina
- Position: Defender

Senior career*
Years	Team	Apps	(Gls)
1964–1966	Racing Club de Montevideo		
1966–1972	Racing Club de Avellaneda		
1973–1975	Huracán		

International career
1964–1966	Uruguay	4	(0)
- * Club domestic league appearances and goals

Nelson Chabay (29 June 1940 – 2 November 2018) was a Uruguayan footballer who played as a defender.

== Career ==
Born in Montevideo, Chabay played for Racing Club de Montevideo, Racing Club de Avellaneda and Huracán.

He earned 4 caps for the Uruguay national team.

== Later life and death ==
He died on 2 November 2018 at a hospital in Buenos Aires following an illness. He had suffered a stroke a few years earlier.
