= Juan José Rodríguez (Argentine footballer) =

Argentine footballer (1937–1993)

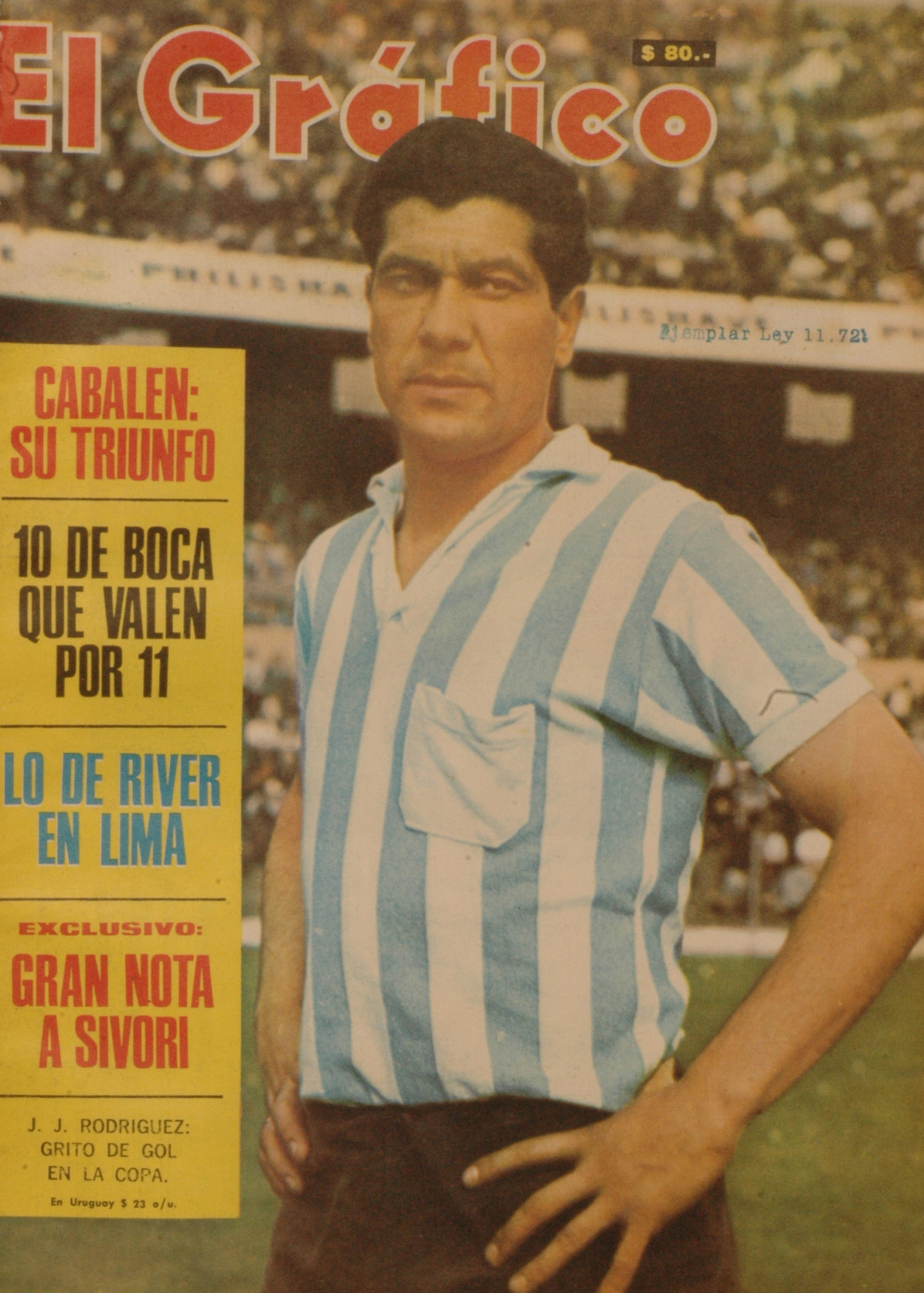
- Rodríguez in a 1967 edition of El Gráfico

Personal information
- Date of birth: 11 January 1937
- Date of death: 2 June 1993 (aged 56)
- Position: Forward

International career
| Years | Team | Apps | (Gls) |
| 1959 | Argentina | 6 | (0) |

Juan José Rodríguez (11 January 1937 – 2 June 1993) was an Argentine footballer who played as a forward. He made six appearances for the Argentina national team in 1959. He was also part of Argentina's squad for the 1959 South American Championship that took place in Ecuador.

== Honours ==
Boca Juniors

- Primera División: 1964

Racing Club

- Primera División: 1966
- Copa Libertadores: 1967
- Intercontinental Cup: 1967

Argentina

- Copa América: 1959
