= 1966 in Argentine football =

Football in Argentina
- Season: 1966

1966 saw Racing Club win the league title, it would be their last national title for 35 years. Argentina played in the 1966 FIFA World Cup, reaching the quarter-finals.

== League table ==
Position	Team	Points	Played	Won	Drawn	Lost	For	Against	Difference
1	Racing Club	61	38	24	13	1	70	24	46
2	River Plate	56	38	22	12	4	66	26	40
3	Boca Juniors	48	38	17	14	7	51	32	19
4	San Lorenzo	46	38	17	12	9	48	34	14
5	Vélez Sársfield	46	38	15	16	7	49	38	11
6	Independiente	44	38	14	16	8	54	34	20
7	Estudiantes de La Plata	41	38	12	17	9	44	37	7
8	Gimnasia de La Plata	39	38	13	13	12	49	41	8
9	Argentinos Juniors	39	38	14	11	13	40	44	-4
10	Atlanta	38	38	10	18	10	45	39	6
11	Newell's Old Boys	38	38	14	10	14	45	51	-6
12	Rosario Central	37	38	10	17	11	31	30	1
13	Banfield	37	38	13	11	14	45	48	-3
14	Lanús	31	38	9	13	16	43	55	-12
15	Huracán	29	38	10	9	19	41	62	-21
16	Colón de Santa Fe	27	38	8	11	19	30	53	-23
17	Platense	27	38	6	15	17	25	51	-26
18	Ferro Carril Oeste	27	38	9	9	20	37	64	-27
19	Quilmes	26	38	8	10	20	39	59	-20
20	Chacarita Juniors	23	38	5	13	20	36	66	-30

=== Relegation ===
There was no relegation after the decision to suspend relegation in preparation for the new Nacional and Metropolitano system.

=== Copa Libertadores ===
- Two teams qualified for Copa Libertadores 1967, Racing Club as champions and River Plate as runners-up

== Copa Libertadores 1966 ==
- River Plate: Runners up
- Independiente: Semi-finalist
- Boca Juniors: Semi-finalist

== Argentina national team ==
World Cup

- 1966 FIFA World Cup: Quarter finalist
