= 1967 Copa Libertadores =

8th season of Copa Libertadores

1967 Copa Libertadores de América
Tournament details
- Dates: February 11 – August 8
- Teams: 20 (from 10 confederations)

Final positions
- Champions: (Argentina) Racing (1st title)
- Runners-up: (Uruguay) Nacional

Tournament statistics
- Matches played: 113
- Goals scored: 353 (3.12 per match)
- Top scorer: (Argentina) Norberto Raffo (14 goals)

The 1967 Copa Libertadores de América was the eighth edition of the Copa Libertadores, where 20 club teams from South American nations competed to be the champion.

The tournament was divided into three rounds; the first group stage, the second group stage, and the final. The tournament was won by Racing of Argentina who beat Nacional of Uruguay.

== Qualified teams ==
The following 20 teams from the 10 CONMEBOL member associations qualified for the tournament:

Country	Team	Qualification method
CONMEBOL; 1 berth	Peñarol	1966 Copa Libertadores de América winners
Argentina; 2 berths	Racing	1966 Primera División champion
Argentina; 2 berths	River Plate	1966 Primera División runner-up
Bolivia; 2 berths	Bolívar	1966 Copa Simón Bolívar champion
Bolivia; 2 berths	31 de Octubre	1966 Copa Simón Bolívar runner-up
Brazil; 2 berth	Cruzeiro	1966 Taça Brasil champion
Brazil; 2 berth	Santos	1966 Taça Brasil runner-up
Chile; 2 berths	Universidad Católica	1966 Primera División champion
Chile; 2 berths	Colo-Colo	1966 Primera División runner-up
Colombia; 2 berths	Santa Fe	1966 Campeonato Profesional champion
Colombia; 2 berths	Independiente Medellín	1966 Campeonato Profesional runner-up
Ecuador; 2 berths	Barcelona	1966 Campeonato Ecuatoriano de Fútbol champion
Ecuador; 2 berths	Emelec	1966 Campeonato Ecuatoriano de Fútbol runner-up
Paraguay; 2 berths	Cerro Porteño	1966 Primera División champion
Paraguay; 2 berths	Guaraní	1966 Primera División runner-up
Peru; 2 berths	Universitario	1966 Torneo Descentralizado champion
Peru; 2 berths	Sport Boys	1966 Torneo Descentralizado runner-up
Uruguay; 1 berth	Nacional	1966 Primera División winner
Venezuela; 2 berths	Deportivo Italia	1966 Venezuelan Primera División champion
Venezuela; 2 berths	Deportivo Galicia	1966 Venezuelan Primera División runners-up

== Draw ==
Nineteen teams were drawn into two groups of six and one group of seven. In each group, teams played against each other home-and-away. The top two teams in each group advanced to the Second round. Peñarol, the title holders, had a bye to the next round.

Group 1	Group 2	Group 3
Brazil; Peru; Venezuela	Argentina; Bolivia; Colombia	Chile; Ecuador; Paraguay; Uruguay

== First round ==
=== Group 1 ===
Pos	Team	Pld	W	D	L	GF	GA	GD	Pts	Qualification or relegation	(Brazil) CRU	(Peru) UNI	(Peru) SBA	(Venezuela) GAL	(Venezuela) ITA	(Brazil) SAN
1	(Brazil) Cruzeiro	8	7	1	0	22	6	+16	15	Qualified to the Semifinals		4–1	3–1	3–1	4–0	
2	(Peru) Universitario	8	5	1	2	11	8	+3	11	Qualified to the Semifinals	2–2		1–0	2–0	1–0	
3	(Peru) Sport Boys	8	2	1	5	10	11	−1	5		1–2	0–3		2–0	0–0	
4	(Venezuela) Deportivo Galicia	8	2	1	5	5	10	−5	5		0–1	2–0	2–1		0–0	
5	(Venezuela) Deportivo Italia	8	1	2	5	3	16	−13	4		0–3	0–3	2–5	1–0		
—	(Brazil) Santos	0	0	0	0	0	0	0	0							

Source: RSSSF

=== Group 2 ===
Pos	Team	Pld	W	D	L	GF	GA	GD	Pts	Qualification or relegation	(Argentina) RAC	(Argentina) RIV	(Colombia) SFE	(Bolivia) BOL	(Colombia) DIM	(Bolivia) OCT
1	(Argentina) Racing	10	8	1	1	29	7	+22	17	Qualified to the Semifinals		2–0	4–1	6–0	5–2	6–0
2	(Argentina) River Plate	10	6	3	1	29	9	+20	15	Qualified to the Semifinals	0–0		4–0	2–0	6–2	7–0
3	(Colombia) Santa Fe	10	3	2	5	17	22	−5	8		1–2	2–2		1–2	2–0	2–0
4	(Bolivia) Bolívar	10	2	4	4	11	21	−10	8		0–2	3–3	2–2		1–1	1–0
5	(Colombia) Independiente Medellín	10	3	1	6	12	22	−10	7		0–2	0–1	0–4	2–0		3–0
6	(Bolivia) 31 de Octubre	10	2	1	7	12	29	−17	5		3–0	0–4	6–2	2–2	1–2	

Source: RSSSF

=== Group 3 ===
Pos	Team	Pld	W	D	L	GF	GA	GD	Pts	Qualification or relegation	(Uruguay) NAC	(Chile) COL	(Chile) CAT	(Paraguay) GUA	(Ecuador) EME	(Ecuador) BAR	(Paraguay) CER
1	(Uruguay) Nacional	12	9	1	2	34	12	+22	19	Qualified to the Semifinals		5–2	0–0	3–1	3–0	2–0	4–1
2	(Chile) Colo-Colo	12	7	1	4	30	28	+2	15	Qualified to the Semifinals	3–2		4–2	1–0	3–2	3–2	5–1
3	(Chile) Universidad Católica	12	5	3	4	19	16	+3	13		0–3	5–2		1–1	1–2	3–1	3–1
4	(Paraguay) Guaraní	12	4	2	6	18	15	+3	10		0–1	4–2	1–1		3–0	4–1	1–2
5	(Ecuador) Emelec	12	4	1	7	16	24	−8	9		1–4	4–3	0–1	0–2		3–0	2–1
6	(Ecuador) Barcelona	12	4	1	7	14	24	−10	9		2–1	1–1	0–2	2–1	2–1		1–2
7	(Paraguay) Cerro Porteño	12	4	1	7	14	26	−12	9		2–6	0–1	1–0	1–0	1–1	1–2	

Source: RSSSF

== Semifinals ==
There was one group of four teams and one of three. In each group, teams played against each other home-and-away. The top team in each group advanced to the Final.

=== Group 1 ===
Pos	Team	Pld	W	D	L	GF	GA	GD	Pts	Qualification or relegation	(Argentina) RAC	(Peru) UNI	(Argentina) RIV	(Chile) COL
1	(Argentina) Racing	6	4	1	1	11	5	+6	9	Qualified to the Final		1–2	3–1	3–1
2	(Peru) Universitario	6	4	1	1	10	5	+5	9		1–2		2–2	3–0
3	(Argentina) River Plate	6	0	3	3	4	8	−4	3		0–0	0–1		1–1
4	(Chile) Colo-Colo	6	1	1	4	3	10	−7	3		0–2	0–1	1–0	

Source: RSSSF

==== Tiebreaker ====
Team 1	Score	Team 2
Racing (Argentina)	2–1	(Peru) Universitario

=== Group 2 ===
Pos	Team	Pld	W	D	L	GF	GA	GD	Pts	Qualification or relegation	(Uruguay) NAC	(Brazil) CRU	(Uruguay) PEÑ
1	(Uruguay) Nacional	4	2	1	1	6	4	+2	5	Qualified to the Final		2–0	2–2
2	(Brazil) Cruzeiro	4	2	0	2	5	6	−1	4		2–1		1–0
3	(Uruguay) Peñarol	4	1	1	2	5	6	−1	3		0–1	3–2	

Source: RSSSF

== Finals ==
15 August 1967

Racing (Argentina)	0–0	(Uruguay) Nacional

El Cilindro, Avellaneda
Attendance: 99,148
Referee: César Orozco (Peru)

25 August 1967

Nacional (Uruguay)	0–0	(Argentina) Racing

Centenario, Montevideo
Attendance: 60,000
Referee: César Orozco (Peru)

29 August 1967

Racing (Argentina)	2–1	(Uruguay) Nacional
Cardoso 14'; Raffo 43'		Viera 79'

Nacional, Santiago
Attendance: 50,000
Referee: Rodolfo Pérez Osorio (Paraguay)

Racing won 2–1 on aggregate.

== Champion ==
Copa Libertadores de América
1967 Winners

Racing
First Title

== Goalscorers ==
The top goalscorer in the tournament was Norberto Raffo of Racing Club, who scored 14 goals.
