= Miguel Mori =

Argentine footballer

Personal information
- Full name: Miguel Ángel Mori
- Date of birth: 17 May 1943
- Place of birth: Baradero, Buenos Aires, Argentina
- Date of death: 13 April 2009 (aged 65)
- Place of death: Baradero, Buenos Aires, Argentina
- Position: Defensive midfielder

Senior career*
Years	Team	Apps	(Gls)
1964–1965	Independiente	14	(2)
1966–1968	Racing Club	73	(4)
1969	Newell's Old Boys	11	(0)
1970	Audax Italiano	7	(0)

International career
1964	Argentina Olympic	2	(0)
- * Club domestic league appearances and goals

Miguel Ángel Mori (17 May 1943 – 13 April 2009) was an Argentine footballer who played for both Independiente and Racing Club.

== Career ==
He won the Copa Libertadores three times, first lifting the trophy with Independiente in 1964 and 1965, and then for rivals Racing Club in 1967. With the latter team, Mori also won the Intercontinental Cup, defeating the Scottish side Celtic. During his time at Racing, the club went on an unbeaten run of 39 consecutive domestic matches, a record not broken until 1999. Miguel Mori left to play in Chile with Audax Italiano in 1970, but was forced to retire following a serious ligament injury. He never won a full cap for Argentina, but played for a representative side at the 1964 Summer Olympics.

== Personal life and death ==
Mori was nicknamed La Chancha. He was honored as a distinguished citizen of Baradero.

On retiring from football, Mori went on to run a bakery in Baradero. He died in hospital in 2009 following complications after receiving open heart surgery.
