= Norberto Raffo =

Argentine footballer (1939–2008)

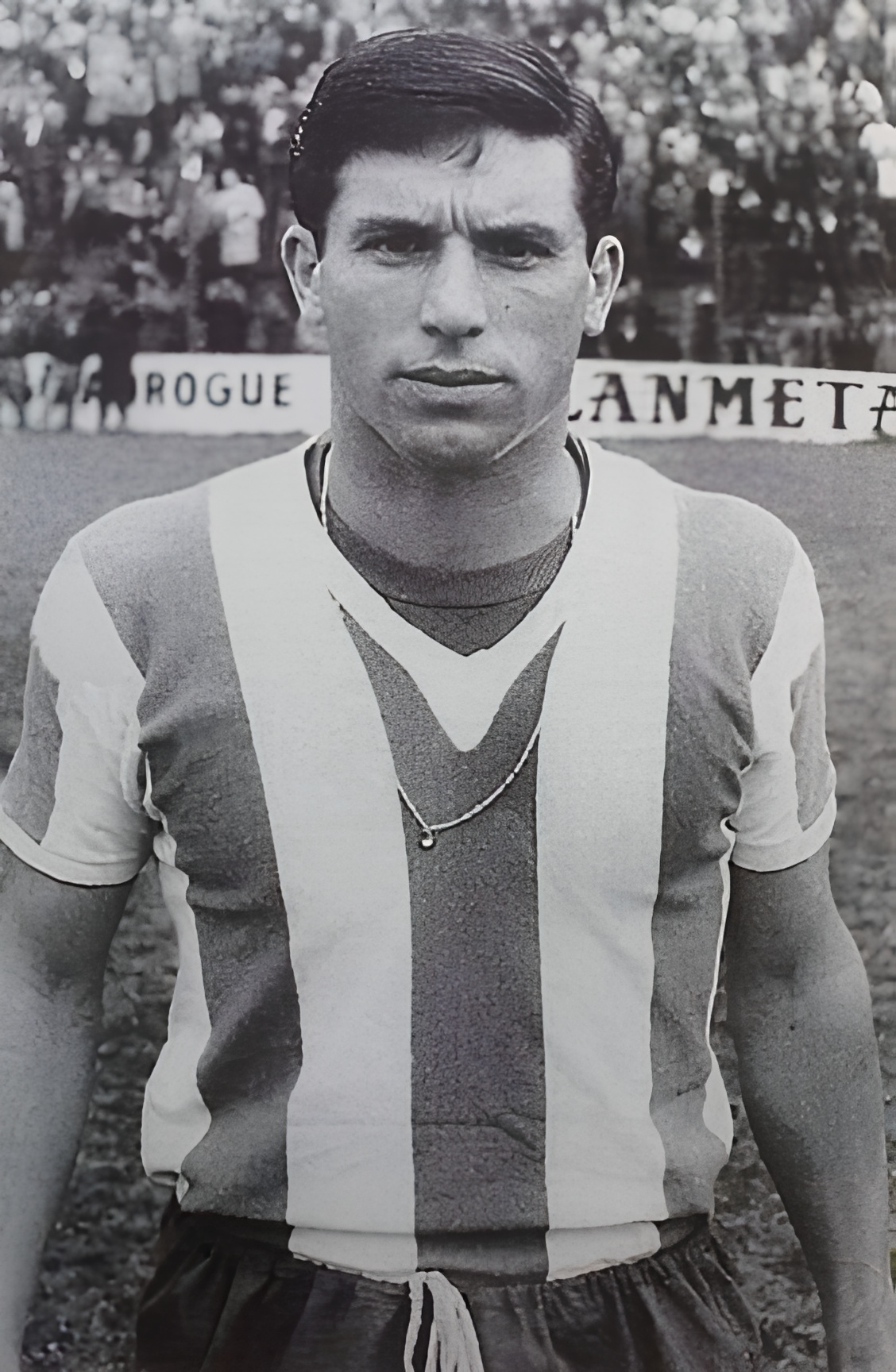
- Raffo with Banfield in 1966

Personal information
- Full name: Norberto Santiago Raffo
- Date of birth: 27 April 1939
- Place of birth: Avellaneda, Buenos Aires, Argentina
- Date of death: 16 December 2008 (aged 69)
- Place of death: Avellaneda, Buenos Aires, Argentina
- Position: Striker

Youth career
- 1953–1957: Independiente

Senior career*
| Years | Team | Apps | (Gls) |
| 1957–1960 | Independiente | 48 | (15) |
| 1961–1966 | Banfield | 180 | (68) |
| 1967–1968 | Racing Club | 40 | (11) |
| 1969–1970 | Atlanta | 29 | (9) |
| 1971 | América de Cali | 20 | (10) |
| 1971 | Lanús | | |
| 1972 | Huachipato | 14 | (0) |
| 1973–1974 | Altos Hornos Zapla | | |

International career
| 1965–1967 | Argentina | 4 | (0) |

Managerial career
- 1975: Lanús
- 1976: Argentino de Quilmes
- 1977: Banfield
- 1978–1979: El Porvenir
- 1979–1980: Lanús
- 1980: Gimnasia de Jujuy
- 1981: Altos Hornos Zapla
- 1987–1996: Lanús (youth)
- 1996–1998: Talleres RdE
- * Club domestic league appearances and goals

Norberto Santiago Raffo (27 April 1939 – 16 December 2008) was an Argentine footballer who played as a striker. He was the Copa Libertadores de América Topscorer in Copa Libertadores 1967 with 14 goals for eventual champions Racing Club, the third highest total ever achieved in a single Copa Libertadores season.

== Playing career ==
Raffo was born in the city of Avellaneda in the Buenos Aires Province of Argentina. He played for both of the Avellaneda giants Independiente and Racing Club winning major titles with both teams.

He is best remembered by the fans of Banfield for scoring 68 goals in 180 games for the club between 1960 and 1966, making him the 3rd top scorer in the club's history.

Raffo also played for Atlanta, Lanús, Altos Hornos Zapla in Argentina, Huachipato in Chile and América de Cali in Colombia.

== Managerial career ==
Raffo went on to manage several Argentine clubs, most notably Lanús on several occasions and Banfield. His other clubs included Argentino de Quilmes, El Porvenir, Gimnasia y Esgrima de Jujuy, Altos Hornos Zapla and Talleres (RE).

Raffo also had a long spell in charge of the Lanús youth team, between 1987 and 1996.

== Personal life ==
His son, Néstor Santiago, is a former footballer for Racing Club.

== Honours ==
| Season | Club | Title |
|---|---|---|
| 1960 | Independiente | Primera División Argentina |
| 1962 | Banfield | Primera B Nacional |
| 1966 | Racing Club | Copa Libertadores |
| 1967 | Racing Club | Copa Intercontinental |
| 1972 | Lanús | Primera B |
| 1973 | Altos Hornos Zapla | Liga Jujueña de Futbol |
