= América de Manta =

América (de Manta)
- Full name: Club Deportivo América
- Founded: 1923; 103 years ago
- Dissolved: 1995
- Ground: Estadio Jocay; Manta, Ecuador
- Capacity: 12,000
Home colours

Club Deportivo América, commonly known as América de Manta, was an Ecuadorian football club based in Manta. Founded in 1923, it participated in the Serie A for two seasons in 1964 1966. It dissolved in 1995.
