= Juan Carlos Cárdenas =

Argentine footballer and coach (1945–2022)

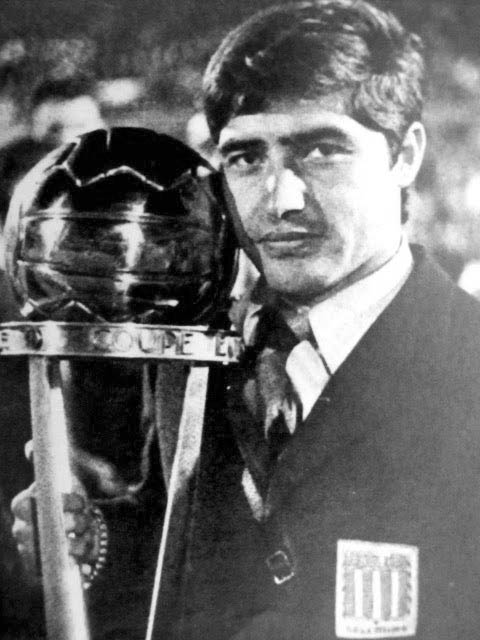
- Cárdenas with the Intercontinental Cup trophy, 1967

Personal information
- Date of birth: 25 July 1945
- Place of birth: Santiago del Estero, Argentina
- Date of death: 30 March 2022 (aged 76)
- Place of death: Buenos Aires, Argentina
- Position: Striker

Youth career
- Unión Santiago

Senior career*
Years	Team	Apps	(Gls)
1960–1961	Unión Santiago		
1962–1972	Racing Club	298	(81)
1963	→ Nueva Chicago (loan)	22	(10)
1972–1975	Puebla		
1975–1976	Veracruz		
1977	Racing Club	(see above)	

International career
1967–1976	Argentina	5	(1)
- * Club domestic league appearances and goals

Juan Carlos Cárdenas (25 July 1945 – 30 March 2022), nicknamed el Chango (the Kid, in the local Santiago del Estero sense), was an Argentine football player and coach. He played for a number of clubs in Argentina and Mexico as well as playing for the Argentina national team.

== Club career ==
Cárdenas was spotted in 1962 by Racing Club de Avellaneda playing as a teenager for Unión Santiago. He spent one year on loan in the Argentine 2nd Division with Nueva Chicago before returning to Racing Club in 1964. He was part of the championship winning team of 1966. In 1967, he helped the club to win the Copa Libertadores and later that year he scored the decisive goal against Celtic in the Copa Intercontinental to make Racing Club the first Argentine club to become club champions of the world.

In 1972 Cárdenas moved to Mexico where he played for Camoteros de Puebla and Tiburones Rojos de Veracruz returning to Racing Club in 1977.

Cárdenas also held the record of the youngest player to score in a Copa Libertadores match for nearly 60 years, as he scored Racing's second in a 2–2 home draw against Nacional Montevideo on 26 February 1962 at the age of 16 years, 7 months and 2 days. His record was broken by Ângelo Gabriel only in 2021.

== Coaching career ==
After retiring as a player Cárdenas became the manager of several lower league teams in Argentina, including All Boys, Deportivo Armenio and General Lamadrid (being champion in this last one in 1977).

== Honours ==
Racing Club

- Copa Intercontinental: 1967
- Copa Libertadores: 1967
- Primera División Argentina: 1961, 1966
