= List of Copa Libertadores top scorers =

This is a year-by-year and all-time list of top scorers in the Copa Libertadores football tournament. Alberto Spencer is the all-time top goalscorer of the Copa Libertadores with 54 goals, while Daniel Onega is the record top goalscorer in a single season, with 17 goals in 1966.

The data below does not include the 1948 South American Championship of Champions, as it is not listed by CONMEBOL either as a Copa Libertadores edition or as an official competition. It must be pointed out, however, that at least in the years 1996 and 1997, CONMEBOL entitled equal status to both the Copa Libertadores and the 1948 tournament, in that the 1948 champions (Vasco da Gama) were allowed to participate in the Supercopa Libertadores, a CONMEBOL official competition that allowed participation for former Libertadores champions only (for example, not admitting participation for champions of other CONMEBOL official competitions, such as the Copa CONMEBOL).

== Top scorers by season ==
Season	Player(s)	Nationality	Club(s)	Goals
1960	Alberto Spencer	Ecuador	(Uruguay) Peñarol	7
1961	Osvaldo Panzutto	Argentina	(Colombia) Santa Fe	4
1962	Coutinho	Brazil	(Brazil) Santos	6
1962	Enrique Raymondi	Ecuador	(Ecuador) Emelec	6
1962	Alberto Spencer	Ecuador	(Uruguay) Peñarol	6
1963	José Sanfilippo	Argentina	(Argentina) Boca Juniors	7
1964	Mario Rodríguez	Argentina	(Argentina) Independiente	6
1965	Pelé	Brazil	(Brazil) Santos	8
1966	Daniel Onega	Argentina	(Argentina) River Plate	17
1967	Norberto Raffo	Argentina	(Argentina) Racing	14
1968	Tupazinho	Brazil	(Brazil) Palmeiras	11
1969	Alberto Ferrero	Uruguay	(Chile) Santiago Wanderers	8
1970	Francisco Bertocchi	Uruguay	(Ecuador) LDU Quito	9
1970	Oscar Más	Argentina	(Argentina) River Plate	9
1971	Luis Artime	Argentina	(Uruguay) Nacional	10
1971	Raul Castronovo	Argentina	(Uruguay) Peñarol	10
1972	Toninho Guerreiro	Brazil	(Brazil) São Paulo	6
1972	Teófilo Cubillas	Peru	(Peru) Alianza Lima	6
1972	Oswaldo Ramírez	Peru	(Peru) Universitario	6
1972	Percy Rojas	Peru	(Peru) Universitario	6
1973	Carlos Caszely	Chile	(Chile) Colo-Colo	9
1974	Fernando Morena	Uruguay	(Uruguay) Peñarol	7
1974	Pedro Rocha	Uruguay	(Brazil) São Paulo	7
1974	Terto	Brazil	(Brazil) São Paulo	7
1975	Fernando Morena	Uruguay	(Uruguay) Peñarol	8
1975	Oswaldo Ramírez	Peru	(Peru) Universitario	8
1976	Palhinha	Brazil	(Brazil) Cruzeiro	13
1977	Néstor Scotta	Argentina	(Colombia) Deportivo Cali	5
1978	Guillermo La Rosa	Peru	(Peru) Alianza Lima	8
1978	Néstor Scotta	Argentina	(Colombia) Deportivo Cali	8
1979	Miltão	Brazil	(Brazil) Guarani	6
1979	Juan José Oré	Peru	(Peru) Universitario	6
1980	Waldemar Victorino	Uruguay	(Uruguay) Nacional	6
1981	Zico	Brazil	(Brazil) Flamengo	11
1982	Fernando Morena	Uruguay	(Uruguay) Peñarol	7
1983	Arsenio Luzardo	Uruguay	(Uruguay) Nacional	8
1984	Tita	Brazil	(Brazil) Flamengo	8
1985	Juan Carlos Sánchez	Argentina	(Bolivia) Blooming	11
1986	Juan Carlos de Lima	Uruguay	(Ecuador) Deportivo Quito	9
1987	Ricardo Gareca	Argentina	(Colombia) América de Cali	7
1988	Arnoldo Iguarán	Colombia	(Colombia) Millonarios	5
1989	Carlos Aguilera	Uruguay	(Uruguay) Peñarol	10
1989	Raúl Vicente Amarilla	Spain	(Paraguay) Olimpia	10
1990	Adriano Samaniego	Paraguay	(Paraguay) Olimpia	7
1991	Gaúcho	Brazil	(Brazil) Flamengo	8
1992	Palhinha	Brazil	(Brazil) São Paulo	7
1993	Juan Carlos Almada	Argentina	(Chile) Universidad Católica	9
1994	Stalin Rivas	Venezuela	(Venezuela) Minervén	7
1995	Mário Jardel	Brazil	(Brazil) Grêmio	12
1996	Antony de Ávila	Colombia	(Colombia) América de Cali	11
1997	Alberto Acosta	Argentina	(Chile) Universidad Católica	11
1998	Sérgio João	Brazil	(Bolivia) Bolívar	10
1999	Gauchinho	Brazil	(Paraguay) Cerro Porteño	6
1999	Fernando Baiano	Brazil	(Brazil) Corinthians	6
1999	Víctor Bonilla	Colombia	(Colombia) Deportivo Cali	6
1999	Ruberth Morán	Venezuela	(Venezuela) Estudiantes de Mérida	6
1999	Ruben Sosa	Uruguay	(Uruguay) Nacional	6
2000	Luizão	Brazil	(Brazil) Corinthians	15
2001	Lopes	Brazil	(Brazil) Palmeiras	9
2002	Rodrigo Mendes	Brazil	(Brazil) Grêmio	10
2003	Marcelo Delgado	Argentina	(Argentina) Boca Juniors	9
2003	Ricardo Oliveira	Brazil	(Brazil) Santos	9
2004	Luís Fabiano	Brazil	(Brazil) São Paulo	8
2005	Santiago Salcedo	Paraguay	(Paraguay) Cerro Porteño	9
2006	Aloísio	Brazil	(Brazil) São Paulo	5
2006	Félix Borja	Ecuador	(Ecuador) El Nacional	5
2006	José Luis Calderón	Argentina	(Argentina) Estudiantes	5
2006	Agustín Delgado	Ecuador	(Ecuador) LDU Quito	5
2006	Sebastián Ereros	Argentina	(Argentina) Vélez Sársfield	5
2006	Ernesto Farías	Argentina	(Argentina) River Plate	5
2006	Fernandão	Brazil	(Brazil) Internacional	5
2006	Marcinho	Brazil	(Brazil) Palmeiras	5
2006	Daniel Montenegro	Argentina	(Argentina) River Plate	5
2006	Nilmar	Brazil	(Brazil) Corinthians	5
2006	Mariano Pavone	Argentina	(Argentina) Estudiantes	5
2006	Jorge Quinteros	Argentina	(Chile) Universidad Católica	5
2006	Patricio Urrutia	Ecuador	(Ecuador) LDU Quito	5
2006	Washington	Brazil	(Brazil) Palmeiras	5
2007	Salvador Cabañas	Paraguay	(Mexico) América	10
2008	Salvador Cabañas	Paraguay	(Mexico) América	8
2008	Marcelo Moreno	Bolivia	(Brazil) Cruzeiro	8
2009	Mauro Boselli	Argentina	(Argentina) Estudiantes	8
2010	Thiago Ribeiro	Brazil	(Brazil) Cruzeiro	8
2011	Roberto Nanni	Argentina	(Paraguay) Cerro Porteño	7
2011	Wallyson	Brazil	(Brazil) Cruzeiro	7
2012	Matías Alustiza	Argentina	(Ecuador) Deportivo Quito	8
2012	Neymar	Brazil	(Brazil) Santos	8
2013	Jô	Brazil	(Brazil) Atlético Mineiro	7
2014	Julio dos Santos	Paraguay	(Paraguay) Cerro Porteño	5
2014	Nicolás Olivera	Uruguay	(Uruguay) Defensor Sporting	5
2015	Gustavo Bou	Argentina	(Argentina) Racing	8
2016	Jonathan Calleri	Argentina	(Brazil) São Paulo	9
2017	José Sand	Argentina	(Argentina) Lanús	9
2018	Miguel Borja	Colombia	(Brazil) Palmeiras	9
2018	Wilson Morelo	Colombia	(Colombia) Santa Fe	9
2019	Gabriel Barbosa	Brazil	(Brazil) Flamengo	9
2020	Fidel Martínez	Ecuador	(Ecuador) Barcelona	8
2021	Gabriel Barbosa	Brazil	(Brazil) Flamengo	11
2022	Pedro	Brazil	(Brazil) Flamengo	12
2023	Germán Cano	Argentina	(Brazil) Fluminense	13
2024	Júnior Santos	Brazil	(Brazil) Botafogo	10
2025	José Manuel López	Argentina	(Brazil) Palmeiras	7
2025	Adrián Martínez	Argentina	(Argentina) Racing	7

== All-time top scorers ==
As of 28 November 2025
Players in bold played in 2025 Copa Libertadores.

Rank	Nation	Player	Goals	Apps	Goal Ratio	Debut	Club(s) (goals)
1	(Ecuador)	Alberto Spencer	54	87	0.62	1960	Peñarol (48); Barcelona (6)
2	(Uruguay)	Fernando Morena	37	77	0.48	1973	Peñarol (37)
3	(Uruguay)	Pedro Virgilio Rocha	36	89	0.40	1962	Peñarol (25); São Paulo (10); Palmeiras (1)
4	(Argentina)	Daniel Onega	31	47	0.66	1966	River Plate (31)
4	(Brazil)	Gabriel Barbosa	31	60	0.52	2018	Santos (1); Flamengo (30)
4	(Colombia)	**Miguel Borja**	31	69	0.45	2015	Atlético Nacional (5); Palmeiras (11); Atlético Junior (7); River Plate (8)
7	(Uruguay)	Julio Morales	30	76	0.39	1966	Nacional (30)
7	(Argentina)	**Lucas Pratto**	30	96	0.31	2011	Universidad Católica (6); Vélez Sarsfield (8); Atlético Mineiro (7); River Plate (9)
9	(Brazil)	Luizão	29	43	0.67	1998	Vasco da Gama (5); Corinthians (15); Grêmio (4); São Paulo (5)
9	(Argentina)	Juan Carlos Sarnari	29	62	0.47	1966	River Plate (10); Universidad Católica (12); Universidad de Chile (4); Santa Fe (3)
9	(Colombia)	Antony de Ávila	29	94	0.31	1983	América de Cali (27); Barcelona (2)
12	(Argentina)	Luis Artime	28	41	0.68	1966	Independiente (8); Nacional (20)
12	(Argentina)	Alberto Acosta	28	55	0.51	1988	San Lorenzo (8); Boca Juniors (2); Universidad Católica (18)

== See also ==
- History of the Copa Libertadores
- Records and statistics of the Copa Libertadores
- List of Copa Libertadores winning managers
