= 1978 Campeonato Ecuatoriano de Fútbol Serie A =

Campeonato Ecuatoriano de Fútbol
- Season: 1978
- Champions: El Nacional
- Relegated: LDU Quito; Manta; LDU Portoviejo; Valdez
- Copa Libertadores: El Nacional; Técnico Universitario
- Matches: 192
- Goals: 483 (2.52 per match)

The 1978 Campeonato Ecuatoriano de Fútbol de la Serie A was the 20th national championship for football teams in Ecuador.

== Teams ==
The number of teams for this season was played by 12 teams. Bonita Banana and Valdez promoted as winners of First Stage of Serie B.

Club	City
Barcelona	Guayaquil
Bonita Banana	Machala
Deportivo Cuenca	Cuenca
Deportivo Quito	Quito
El Nacional	Quito
Emelec	Guayaquil
LDU Portoviejo	Portoviejo
LDU Quito	Quito
Manta	Manta
Técnico Universitario	Ambato
Universidad Católica	Quito
Valdez	Milagro

== First stage ==
Pos	Team	Pld	W	D	L	GF	GA	GD	Pts	Qualification or relegation
1	El Nacional	18	6	9	3	19	14	+5	21	Qualified to the Liguilla Final
2	Técnico Universitario	18	7	6	5	22	21	+1	20	Qualified to the Liguilla Final
3	Emelec	18	6	7	5	31	23	+8	19	Qualified to the Liguilla Final
4	LDU Portoviejo	18	6	7	5	27	24	+3	19	
5	Deportivo Quito	18	5	9	4	17	19	−2	19	
6	Deportivo Cuenca	18	6	6	6	15	17	−2	18	
7	Barcelona	18	6	5	7	20	20	0	17	
8	Universidad Católica	18	5	7	6	21	22	−1	17	
9	LDU Quito	18	5	7	6	13	17	−4	17	Relegated to the Serie B
10	Manta	18	5	3	10	21	29	−8	13	Relegated to the Serie B

Source: RSSSF - 1978 Serie A

== Second stage ==
Pos	Team	Pld	W	D	L	GF	GA	GD	Pts	Qualification or relegation
1	El Nacional	18	10	3	5	43	16	+27	23	Qualified to the Liguilla Final
2	Barcelona	18	10	3	5	29	20	+9	23	Qualified to the Liguilla Final
3	Técnico Universitario	18	8	6	4	26	20	+6	22	Qualified to the Liguilla Final
4	Emelec	18	9	4	5	23	17	+6	22	
5	Bonita Banana	18	10	2	6	20	19	+1	22	
6	Deportivo Quito	18	6	4	8	19	21	−2	16	
7	Universidad Católica	18	5	5	8	29	29	0	15	
8	Deportivo Cuenca	18	5	5	8	12	20	−8	15	
9	LDU Portoviejo	18	5	3	10	25	37	−12	13	Relegated to the Serie B
10	Valdez	18	1	7	10	10	37	−27	9	Relegated to the Serie B

Source: RSSSF - 1978 Serie A

== Liguilla Final ==
Pos	Team	Pld	W	D	L	GF	GA	GD	Pts	Qualification
1	El Nacional (Note: El Nacional were awarded six points.) (C)	6	3	1	2	9	6	+3	13	1979 Copa Libertadores
2	Técnico Universitario	6	3	0	3	7	11	−4	9	1979 Copa Libertadores
3	Emelec (Note: Emelec were awarded one point.)	6	3	0	3	12	10	+2	7	
4	Barcelona (Note: Barcelona were awarded two points.)	6	2	1	3	6	7	−1	7	

Source: RSSSF - 1978 Serie A
(C) Champions
Notes:

Campeonato Ecuatoriano de Fútbol
1978 champion
