= History of the Copa Libertadores =

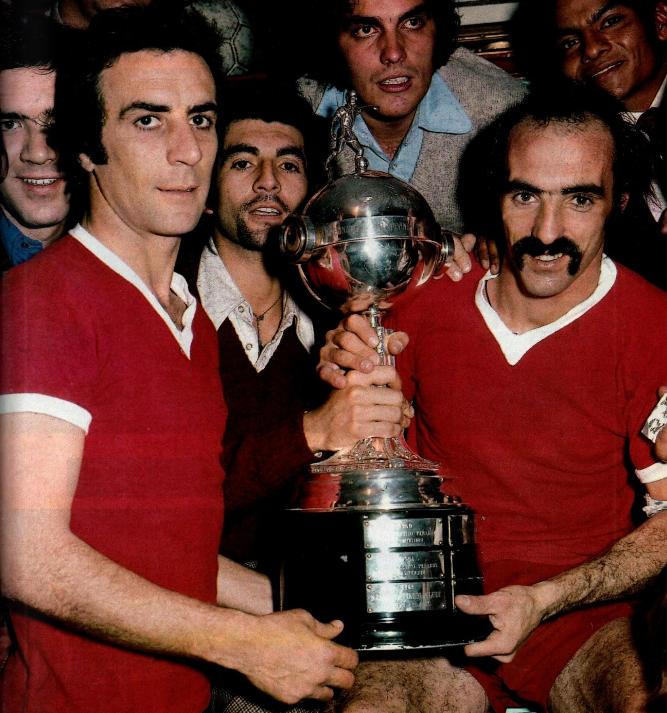
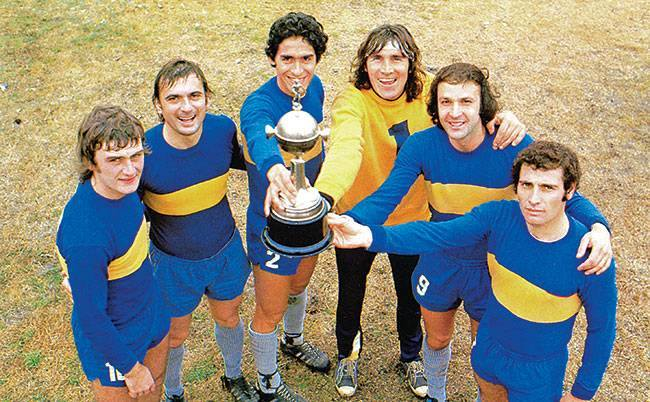
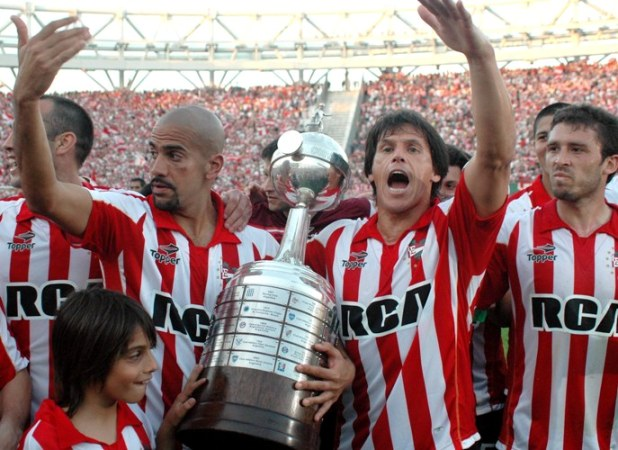
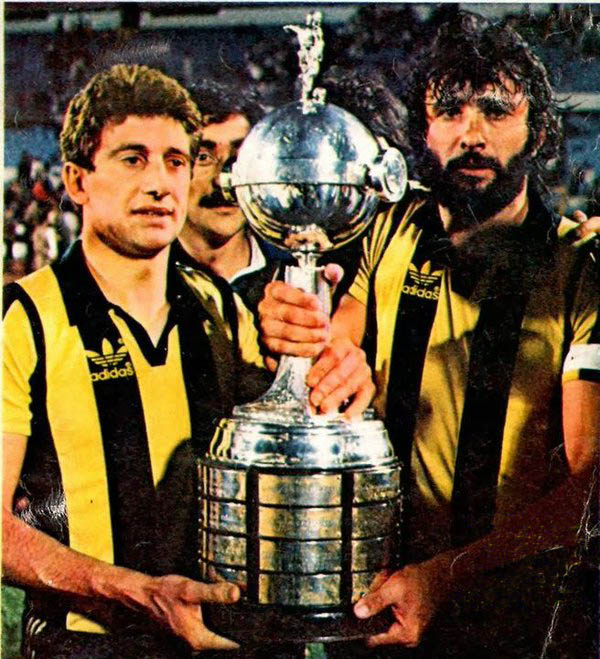
Some of the most Copa Libertadores winning teams in the history of the competition: fltr, clockwise: Independiente (7 titles), Boca Juniors (6), Peñarol (5), Estudiantes de La Plata (4)

The Copa Libertadores is the most important international football club competition in South America. It was first competed for in 1960 and occurs once every year. Throughout the history of the tournament, 25 teams from seven countries have won the competition. It is the equivalent of the UEAFA Champions League in South America.

Notable eras in the tournament's history include Juan Carlos Lorenzo's tenure with Boca Juniors, Flamengo's title victory with a squad led by Zico, and René Higuita's penalty saves for Atlético Nacional against Olimpia. Other prominent periods include São Paulo's time dos sonhos under coach Telê Santana, as well as Carlos Bianchi's managerial successes with both Vélez Sársfield and Boca Juniors.

The sport was introduced to South America in many different ways. For example, football was introduced to Argentina in the latter half of the 19th century by the British immigrants in Buenos Aires, while Colombia was exposed to football in the early 20th century. An expatriate named Charles William Miller introduced the sport to Brazil. Football was first brought to Chile by the British who exhibited the sport during visits to the commercial ports such as in Valparaíso. Dutchman William Paats, who moved from the Netherlands to Asunción (the capital of Paraguay) in 1888, introduced football to Paraguay, as well as laying the foundations for a classic South American club.

== The dawn to the Copa Libertadores ==
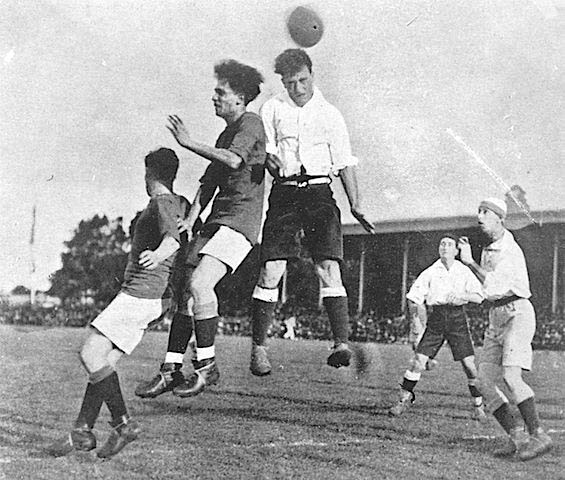
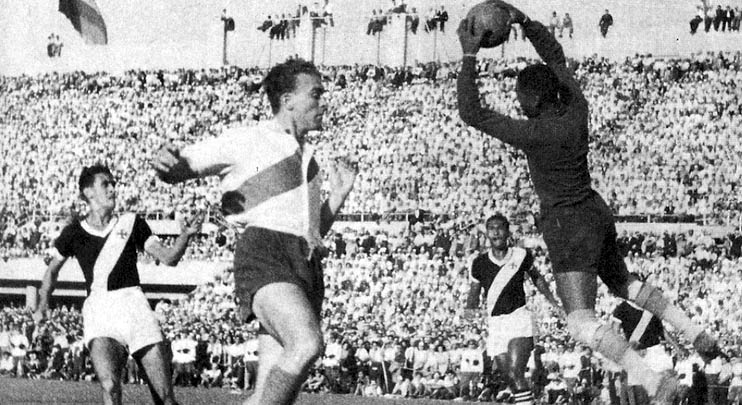
(Left): The first precedent of a continental club competition was Copa Aldao, played between Argentine and Uruguayan champions. In the image, Boca Juniors v Nacional, 1919 edition; (right): Vasco da Gama v River Plate match at the Campeonato Sudamericano de Campeones, an immediate predecessor of Copa Libertadores held in Chile

The roots of the competition had existed for a long while the South American spirit of competition at club level was present since the beginning of the century. During the 1930s and 1940s, Argentinean and Uruguayan clubs vied for the Copa Ricardo Aldao between their respective champions rotating the location of the final every a year Buenos Aires and Montevideo. The delegates of Colo-Colo, after years of insistence, managed to push CONMEBOL into creating the first continental tournament.

The "Campeonato Sudamericano de Campeones" became the first "prototype" and it was successfully played in 1948; Vasco da Gama won the competition played entirely in Santiago, Chile. The 1948 South American tournament impulsed, in continent-wide reach, the "champions cup" model, resulting in the creation of the European Cup in 1955, as confirmed by Jacques Ferran (one of the "founding fathers" of the European Cup), in a 2015 interview to a Brazilian TV sports program. The connection between the 1948 competition and the Copa Libertadores was recognised by Conmebol with the participation of Vasco da Gama in the 1997 Supercopa Libertadores, a Conmebol competition that accepted the participation of Copa Libertadores winners only, and the 1948 championship is referred to at the Conmebol website as the competition that, 12 years later, would become the Copa Libertadores.

Another continental competition held prior to Copa Libertadores was the "Copa do Atlântico" organized by three bodies, Argentine, Brazilian and Uruguayan Associations, with five teams from each of them taking part of the tournament. The cup had only one edition in 1956, with no champion crowned after Boca Juniors and Corinthians qualified to the finals. The match had been scheduled for July 19 but it was never played.

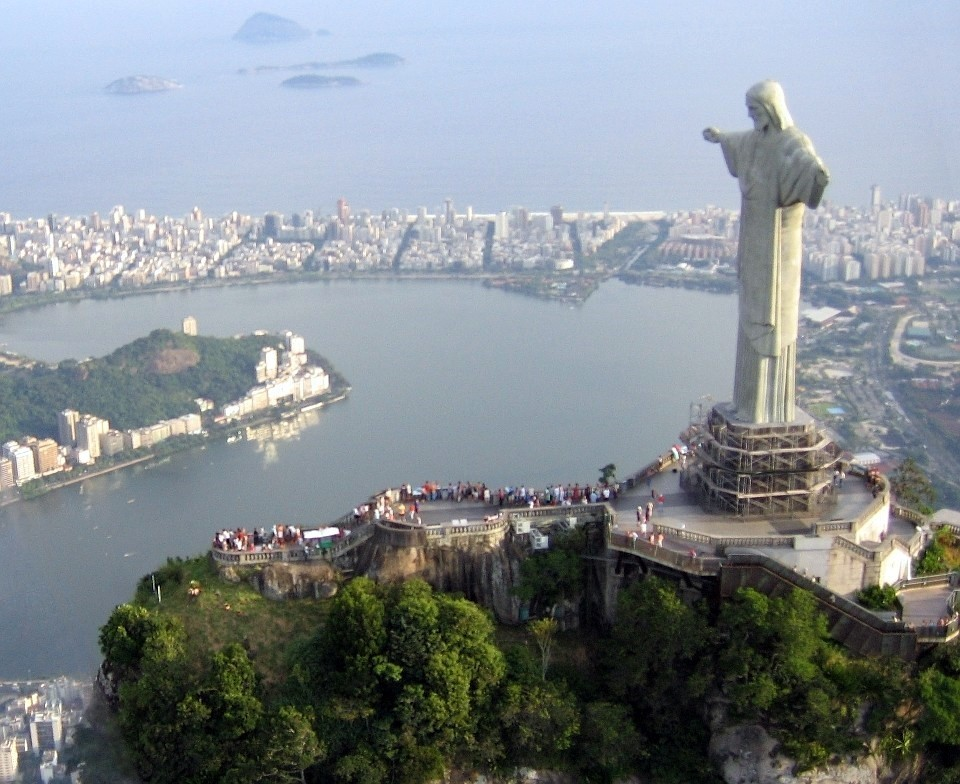
Rio de Janeiro saw the birth for the idea of the competition

For all this, the subject of the South American Congress held in 1958 in Rio de Janeiro was not unknown to board members: Raúl Colombo and Eduardo Palma of Argentina, Fermín Sorhueta, Washington Cataldi, Luis Tróccoli and Juan Carlos Bracco of Uruguay, Alfredo Gallindo of Bolivia, Lydio Quevedo of Paraguay, Teófilo Salinas of Perú, Alberto Goñi of Chile, and Joao Havelange and Abilio D'Almeida of Brazil. The secretary general of the Union des Associations Européennes de Football, or UEFA, Henry Delaunay, submitted a proposal to the then-head of CONMEBOL José Ramos de Freitas of Brazil to organize an annual double confrontation between the champions of Europe and South America in what was seen as a welcomed but unneeded incentive. The proposal for the creation of a South American club championship was supported by Argentina and Brazil but was opposed by Uruguay, a country which at that time still had a transcendent pre-eminence in the decision-making of the confederation, sharing political and continental power with Argentina. Brazil had just won their first World Cup and had not yet the privileges or political weight that presently holds.

Uruguay's opposition was based on that "the competition being promoted would go against the interest of the South American national-team championships". Moreover, Argentina, with the support of Brazil, had proposed that those tournaments should be played every four years instead of every two in early 1957 (in which Uruguay strongly opposed as they were the main architects of the Campeonato Sudamericano).

On October 8, 1958, João Havelange announced, at a UEFA meeting he attended as an invitee, the creation of Copa de Campeones de America (American Champions Cup, renamed in 1965 as Copa Libertadores), as a South American equivalent of the European Cup, so that the champion clubs of both continental confederations could decide "the best club team of the world" in the Intercontinental Cup.

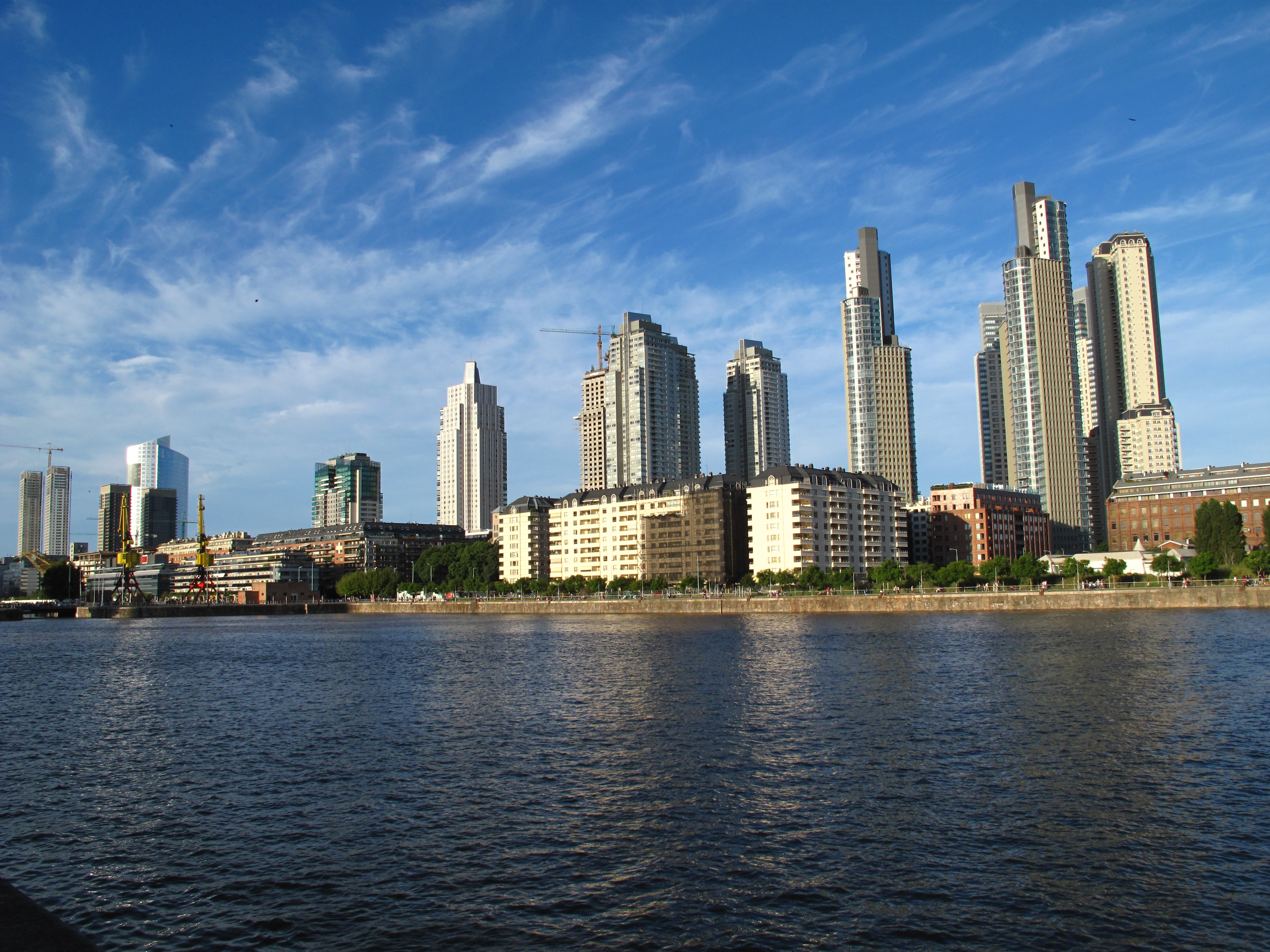
Buenos Aires was the birthplace of the tournament during the 24th South American congress

On March 5, 1959, the Chilean delegates insisted and proposed the creation of the South American club tournament at the 24th South American Congress held in Buenos Aires which was approved by the International Affairs Committee. Only the Uruguayans voted against it. The tournament would be named in homage of the heroes of South American history such as Simón Bolívar, Pedro I of Brazil José de San Martín, Manuel Belgrano, Bernardo O'Higgins, José Miguel Carrera, José Gervasio Artigas, Antonio José de Sucre, Ramón Castilla, José Joaquín de Olmedo, among others: the Copa Libertadores de America. That was the last deed of José Ramos de Freitas as president of CONMEBOL who relinquished his position to the newly elected president, Uruguayan Fermín Sorhueta. In Montevideo, the idea was approved with the presence of all 10 CONMEBOL representatives to finally begin the development of the tournament with the first edition being played by seven participants. The club president of Peñarol, Washington Cataldi, explained years later:

The history of the Copa Libertadores is well known by everyone. We have been pioneers, along with other South American leaders, to establish it (1960) and to add later the runners-up of each league (1966). It was said that this was a maneuver to ensure the presence of the two giants of Uruguayan football. Some of that is true. But it wasn't the only basis. I personally toured every South American nation to show everyone that to make the Cup everlasting it was better to play it with 20 teams instead of 10. History has proven me right.

== First decade: 1960–69 ==
=== Beginning: Peñarol ===
The first entrants of the inaugural edition included seven national champions: Bahia of Brazil, Jorge Wilstermann of Bolivia, Millonarios of Colombia, Olimpia of Paraguay, Peñarol of Uruguay, San Lorenzo of Argentina and Universidad de Chile of Chile. Peru, Ecuador and Venezuela did not send any representatives. Carlos Borges of Peñarol scored the first goal of the tournament, with teammate and legendary figure Alberto Spencer scoring the first hat-trick. They will become fundamental figures for Peñarol as the manyas begun their journey with a crushing 7–1 victory over Jorge Wilstermann in the first leg. After a 1–1 draw in the second leg, they progressed to the semifinal stage where they faced the San Lorenzo of José Sanfilippo; after drawing both matches of the semifinal series, the boardmembers of the Ciclón allowed the tie-breaking match to be held at Peñarol's home stadium, the Estadio Centenario, in exchange for economic incentives. This move was quietly criticized by the San Lorenzo players and they went out of the tournament after a 2–1 defeat. In the finals, Peñarol would face Olimpia with the first match being played in Montevideo. The Paraguayans managed to keep the score goalless until 11 minutes from full-time when Spencer broke the deadlock to take a 1–0 victory to Asunción; and in a highly charged atmosphere in the Manuel Ferreira stadium, Luis Cubilla scored at the 83rd minute to tie a match Peñarol was losing since the first half, and give his club the honor of becoming the first ever champions of the competition.

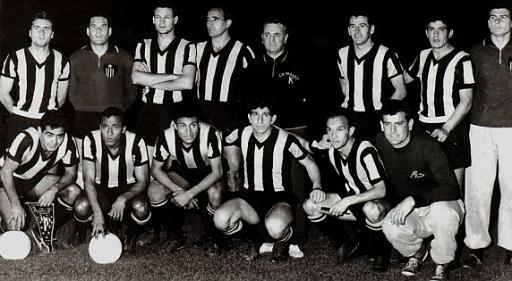
Team of Peñarol, champion in 1961

The second edition of the tournament saw Ecuador and Peru send a representative to the tournament. Peñarol opened their title defense with a 5-0 thrashing over Universitario; the large scoreline allowed the champions to cruise to the semifinals with a 2–0 defeat to face Olimpia, in a rematch of the previous year's final. However, Peñarol swept aside Olimpia with a 3–1 victory at home and a 1–2 triumph away in order to contest their second, consecutive final, this time against Brazilian giants Palmeiras. Like last year's final, Peñarol managed a 1–0 victory in the first leg thanks to another late goal from Alberto Spencer at the 89th minute. In the second leg, Peñarol managed to come away with a 1–1 tie to retain the title. Due to the great contributions made by Peñarol's board directors in the creation of the Copa Libertadores, the success of the Manyas in this two editions are widely considered a "historical justice" well earned.

=== 1962–63: The Santasticos ===
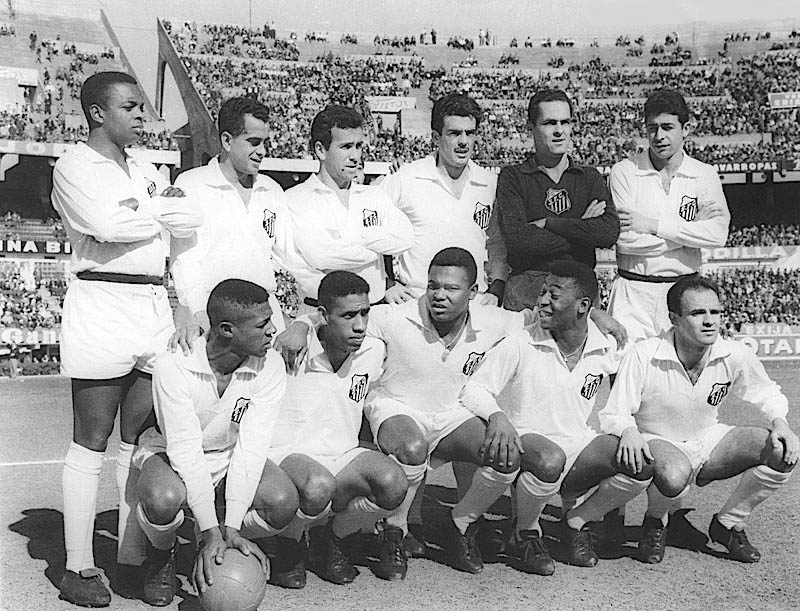
Brazilian Santos FC, led by superstar Pelé, won its first trophy in 1962

During the early years, Peñarol was the dominating team in the South American club football, and managed to reach the final for the third consecutive year when they faced the Brazilian champions Santos. At that time, Santos was led by Brazilian football superstar Pelé. The club went on to win the Taça Brasil that previous year, crushing Bahia in the finals; Pelé finished as top scorer of the tournament with 9 goals. The victory allowed Santos to participate in the Copa Libertadores. The Copa Libertadores did not receive international attention until its third edition, which was swept through the sublime football of the ballet blanco led by Pelé, Coutinho, Lima, Zito, Dorval and Pepe, considered by some the best club team of all times.

Santos' most successful club season started in 1962; the team was seeded in Group 1 alongside Cerro Porteño and Bolivian Deportivo Municipal, winning every match of their group but one (a 1–1 away tie vs Cerro), while performing a 9–1 rout of Cerro. Santos defeated Universidad Católica in the semifinals and met defending champions Peñarol in the finals in which Pelé scored another brace in the playoff match to secure the first title for a Brazilian club. Coutinho and Pelé finished as the first and second best scorer of the competition with 6 and 4 goals, respectively.

As the defending champions, Santos qualified automatically to the semifinal stage of the 1963 Copa Libertadores. The ballet blanco managed to retain the title in spectacular fashion after impressive victories over Botafogo and Boca Juniors. Pelé helped Santos overcome a Botafogo team that contained legends such as Garrincha and Jairzinho with an agonizing last-minute goal in the first leg of the semifinals and bring the match to 1-1. In the second leg, Pelé produced one of his best performances as a footballer with a hat-trick in the Estádio do Maracanã as Santos crushed Botafogo 0–4 in the second leg. Appearing in their second consecutive final, Santos started the series by winning 3–2 in the first leg thanks to a brace by Coutinho and defeating the Boca Juniors of José Sanfilippo and Antonio Rattín 1–2 in La Bombonera, with another goal from Pelé and Coutinho each, becoming the first Brazilian team (until 2017 Grêmio's victory over Lanús) to lift the Copa Libertadores in Argentine soil. Pelé finished the tournament as the scorer runner-up with 5 goals, while Coutinho finished third with 3 goals.

=== 1964–69: Argentine predominance ===
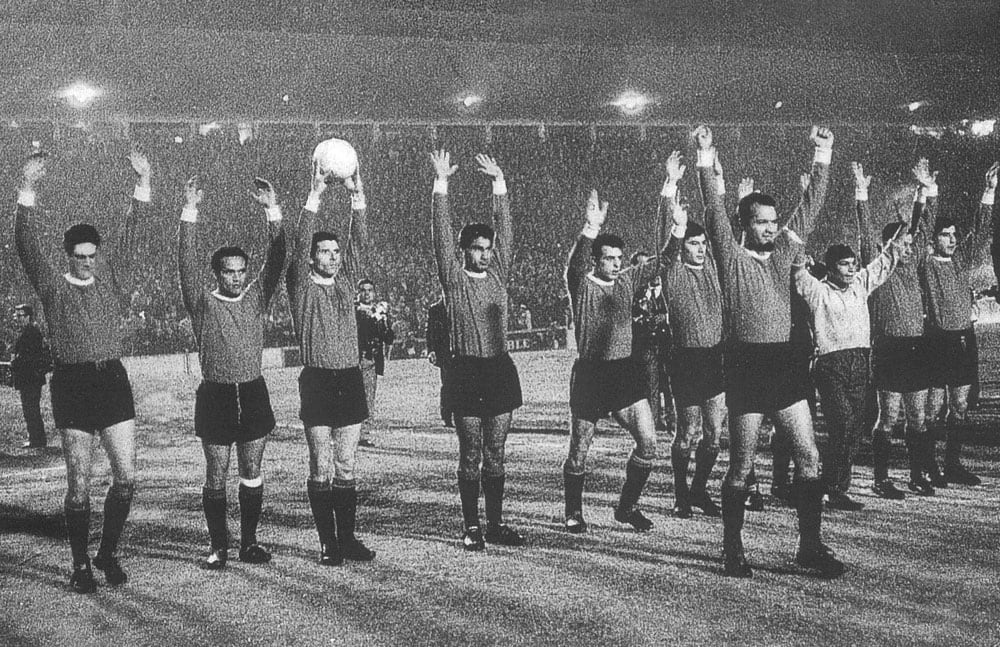
Argentine club Independiente won their first Copa Libertadores in 1964 after beating reigning champions Santos

An Argentine team wrote down its name in the history of the tournament for the first time in 1964. Independiente knocked-out the defending champions Santos in semi-final, and later became the first Argentine team to win the competition.

Argentine football finally inscribed their name on the winner's list in 1964 when Independiente became the champions after disposing of reigning champions Santos and Uruguayan side Nacional in the finals. Independiente successfully defended the title in 1965; Peñarol would defeat River Plate in a playoff to win their third title, and Racing would go on to claim the spoils in 1967. One of the most important moments in the tournament's early history occurred in 1968 which saw Estudiantes participate for the first time.

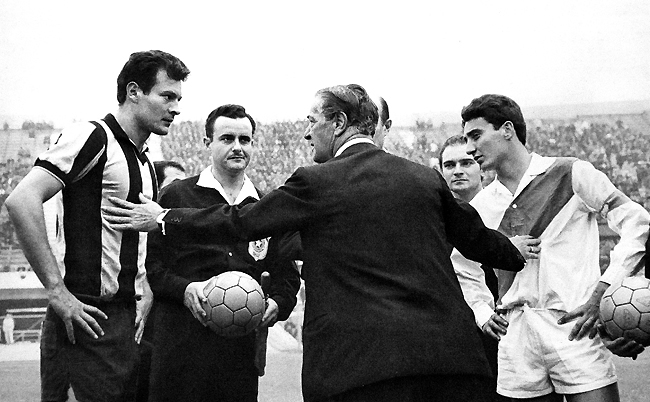
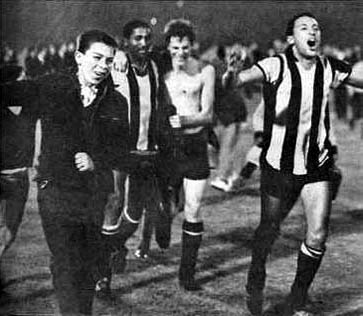
Two moments of the 1966 playoff final between Peñarol and River Plate, (left): Captains of both teams greeting before the match; (right): Peñarol players celebrating their third title

Peñarol lost to the Argentine side Independiente in final of the previous year. In 1966, they successfully revenged by defeating another Argentine team, River Plate, in the extra time of a play-off and clinched their third tournament championship. Colombian and Brazilian clubs did not participate in this tournament.

The defeat in the playoff v. Peñarol (by 4–2 after River won 2–0 at the end of the first half) was a quite a shock for River Plate. The team returned to Argentina to play the domestic league match v. Banfield. During the match, Banfield supporters threw a chicken (with its body painted a red sash) into the field to make fun of River Plate players.

Since that time, and up to present days, the nickname gallinas has remained to refer to River Plate when the team loses a match that could have won.

Other versions refer to a lack of commitment of some River Plate players, stating that manager Renato Cesarini would have shout "I was betrayed" (by the players) after the match.

The championship of Peñarol in 1966 did not stop the Argentine teams' domination in the era. In 1967, another Argentine team won the title: Racing Club. They defeated another Uruguayan team Nacional 2–1 in a play-off and were crowned the South American champions for the first time. Brazil's runner-up Santos declined to play in that years tournament.

Starting from 1968, the era of another Argentine team started. Not being one of the traditional "big five" teams in Argentine football, Estudiantes L.P. broke the domination of the "big five" teams in Argentina in 1967 by winning their first domestic league title. They went on to win the Copa Libertadores in 1968, defeating Palmeiras in the final. Though they did not win the Primera División Argentina in the following years, they continued their success in the continental tournament. Coached by Osvaldo Zubeldía, and led by star players like Carlos Bilardo, Juan Ramón Verón and Oscar Malbernat, they won the Copa Libertadores again in 1969 and 1970, becoming the first team to win the title for three consecutive years.

One of the most important moments in the tournament's early history occurred in 1968 which saw Estudiantes participate for the first time.

Estudiantes, a modest neighborhood club and a relatively minor team in Argentina, had an unusual style that prioritized athletic preparation and achieving results at all costs. Led by coach Osvaldo Zubeldía and a team built around figures such as Carlos Bilardo, Oscar Malbernat and Juan Ramón Verón, went on to become the first ever tricampeón of the competition. The pincharratas won their first title in 1968 by defeating Palmeiras. They successfully defended the title in 1969 and 1970 against Nacional and Peñarol, respectively. Although Peñarol was the first club to win three titles, Estudiantes was the first to win three consecutive titles.

== 1970–79: Argentine decade ==
The 1970s were dominated by Argentine clubs, except for three seasons. In a rematch of the 1969 finals, Nacional emerged as the champions of the 1971 tournament after overcoming an Estudiantes squad depleted of key players.

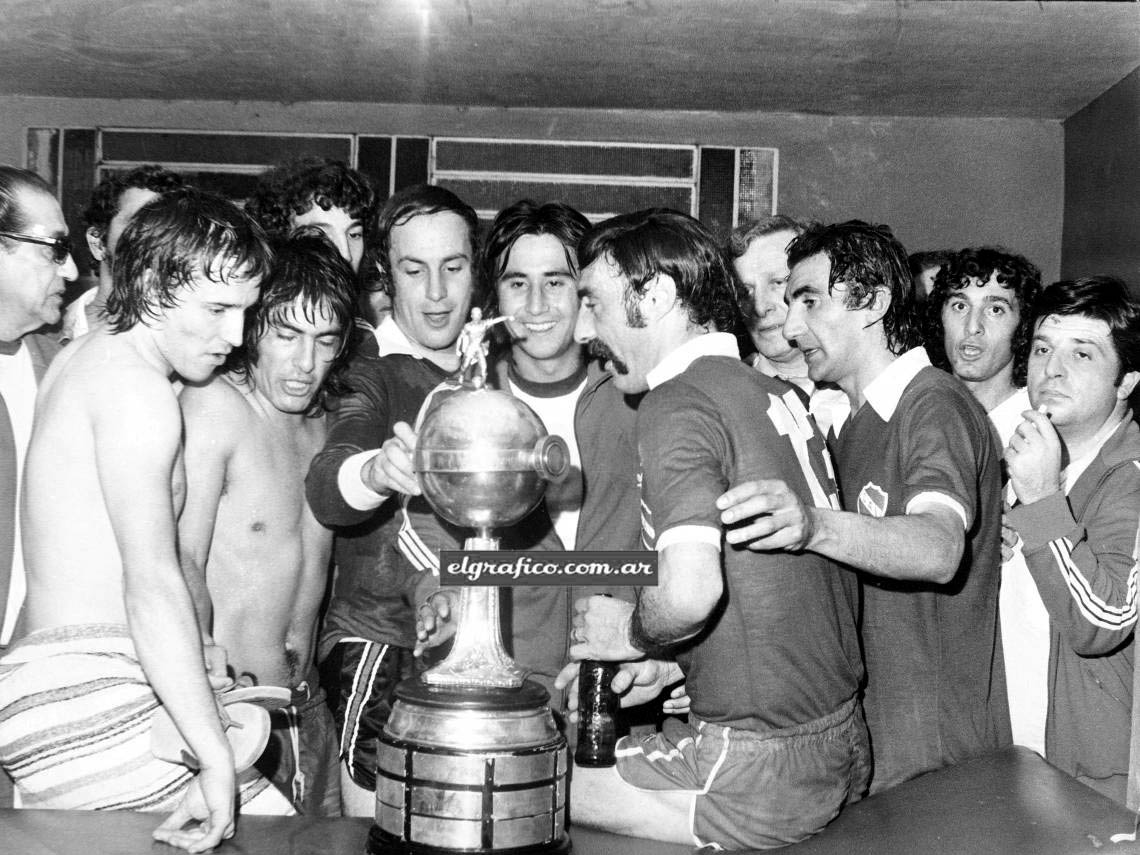
Independiente players with the Cup in 1975, the fourth consecutive won by the team

With two titles already under their belt, Independiente created a winning formula with the likes of Francisco Sa, José Omar Pastoriza, Ricardo Bochini and Daniel Bertoni: pillars of the titles of 1972, 1973, 1974, and 1975. Independiente's home stadium, La Doble Visera, became one of the most dreaded venues for visiting teams to play at. The first of these titles came in 1972 when Independiente came up against Universitario de Deportes of Peru in the finals. Universitario became the first team from the Pacific coast to reach the finals after eliminating Uruguayan giants Peñarol and defending champions Nacional at the semifinal stage. The first leg in Lima ended in a 0–0 tie, while the second leg in Avellaneda finished 2–1 in favor of the home team. Independiente successfully defended the title a year later against Colo-Colo after winning the playoff match 2–1. Los Diablos Rojos retained the trophy in 1974 after defeating São Paulo 1–0 in a hard-fought playoff. In 1975, Unión Española also failed to dethrone the champions in the finals after losing the playoff 2–0.

The reign of Los Diablos Rojos finally ended in 1976 when they were defeated by fellow Argentine club River Plate in the second phase in a dramatic playoff for a place in the finals. However, in the finals River Plate themselves would be beaten by Cruzeiro of Brazil, which was the first victory by a Brazilian club in 13 years.

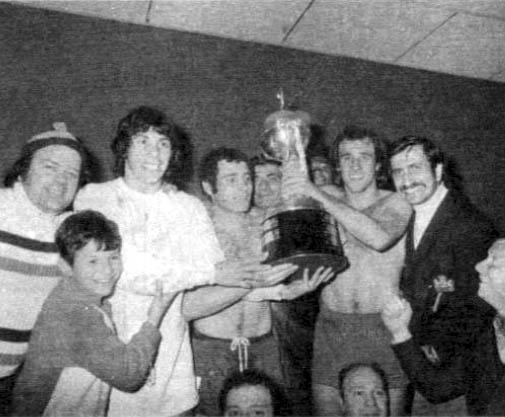
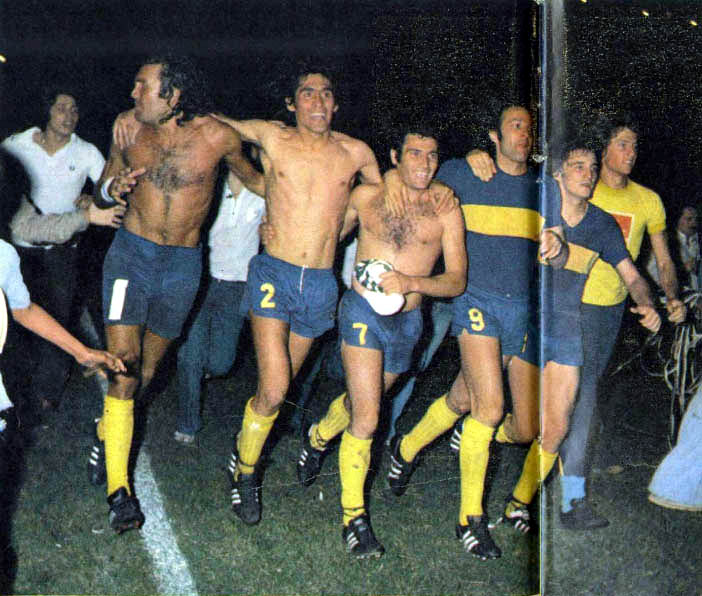
Boca Juniors celebrated two consecutive titles, (left): in 1977 after winning their first Cup v Cruzeiro in the playoff match; (right): 1978 v Deportivo Cali

After having the trophy elude them in 1963 at the hands of Pelé's Santos, Boca Juniors finally managed to appear on the continental football map. Towards the end of the decade, the Xeneizes reached the finals in three consecutive years. The first was in 1977 in which Boca earned their first victory against defending champions Cruzeiro. After both teams won their home legs 1–0, a playoff at a neutral venue was chosen to break the tie. The playoff match finished in a tense 0–0 tie and was decided by a penalty shootout.

Boca Juniors won the trophy again in 1978 after thumping Deportivo Cali of Colombia 4–0 in the second leg of the finals. In the following year, it looked as though Boca Juniors would also achieve a triple championship, only to have Olimpia end their dream after a highly volatile second leg match in Buenos Aires. As in 1963, Boca Juniors had to watch as the visiting team lifted the Copa Libertadores in their home ground and Olimpia became the first (and, as of 2020, only) Paraguayan team to lift the Copa.

Before 1979, no teams from countries other than Argentina, Brazil and Uruguay had ever won a title. However, in 1979, Olimpia successfully brought the trophy back to Paraguay. They defeated Boca Juniors, the champions of the two previous years, in the final and became the first champions not coming from the aforementioned three countries. Their conquest of Boca also ended the Argentine dominance of the past 15 years.

== 1980–89 ==
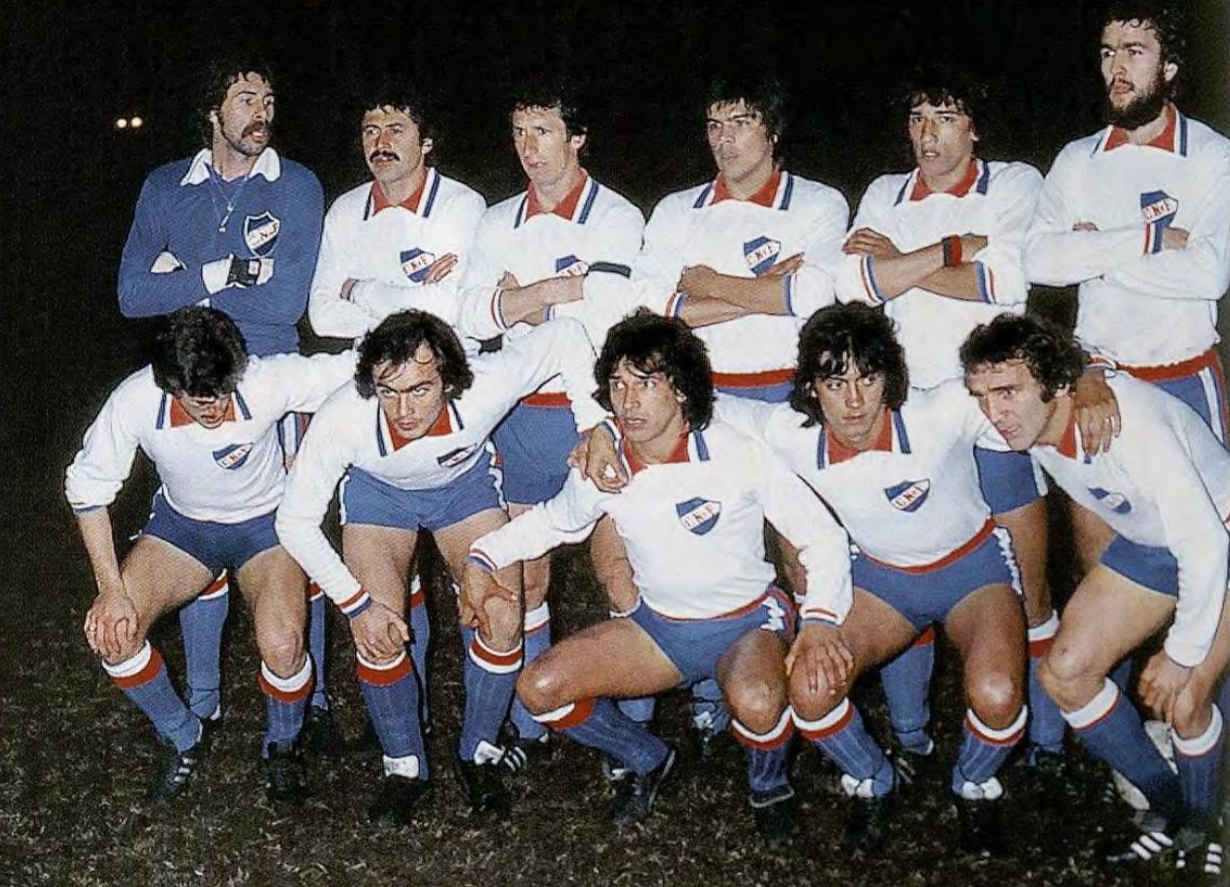
Nacional won its second Libertadores in 1980

Nine years after their first triumph, Nacional won their second cup in 1980 after overcoming Internacional. Despite Brazil's strong status as a football power in South America, 1981 marked only the fourth title won by a Brazilian club. Flamengo, led by stars such as Zico, Júnior, Leandro, Adílio, Nunes, Cláudio Adão, Tita and Carpegiani, sparkled as the Mengão's Golden Generation reached the pinnacle of their careers by beating Cobreloa of Chile.

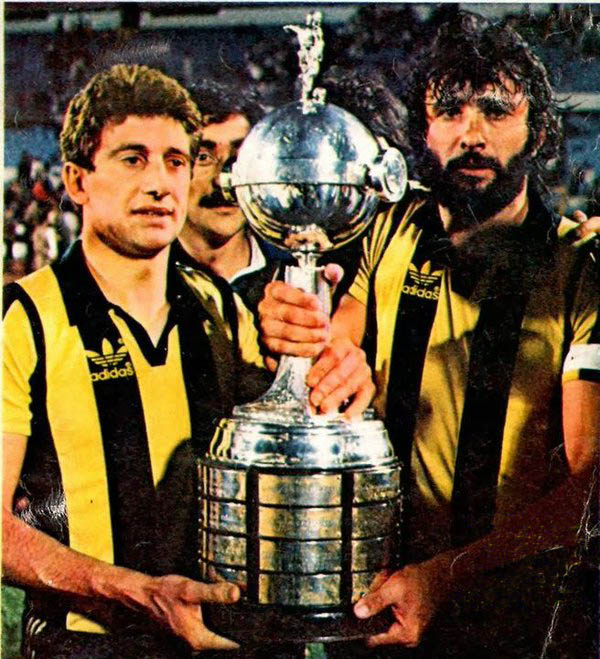
Fernando Morena (left) and Walter Olivera holding the trophy won in 1982

After 16 years of near-perennial failure, Peñarol would go on to win the cup for the fourth time in 1982 after beating the 1981 finalists in consecutive series. First, the Manyas disposed of defending champions Flamengo 1–0 in the last match of the second phase at Flamengo's home ground, the famed Estádio do Maracanã. In the final, they repeated the feat, beating Cobreloa in a decisive second leg match 1–0 in Santiago. Grêmio of Porto Alegre made history by defeating Peñarol to become the champion in 1983. In 1984, Independiente won their seventh cup, a record that stands today, after defeating title holders Grêmio in a final which included a 1–0 win in the first away leg, highlighting Jorge Burruchaga and a veteran Ricardo Bochini.

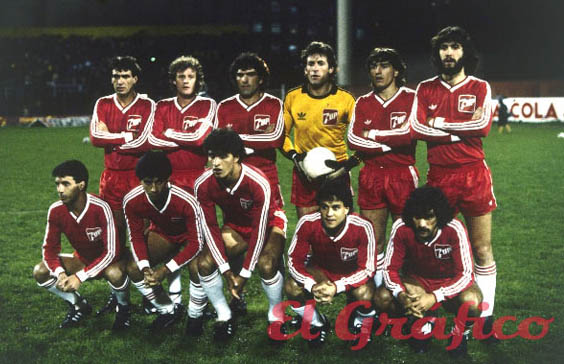
Argentinos Juniors won the 1985 Libertadores after defeating América de Cali by penalty shoot-out

Another team rose from the Pacific, as had Cobreloa. Colombian club América reached three consecutive finals in 1985, 1986 and 1987 but like Cobreloa they could not manage to win a single one. In 1985, Argentinos Juniors, a small club from the neighborhood of La Paternal in Buenos Aires, astonished South America by eliminating holders Independiente in La Doble Visera 2–1 during the last decisive match of the second round, to book a place in the final. Argentinos Juniors went on to win an unprecedented title by beating America de Cali in the play-off match at Estadio Defensores del Chaco via a penalty shootout.

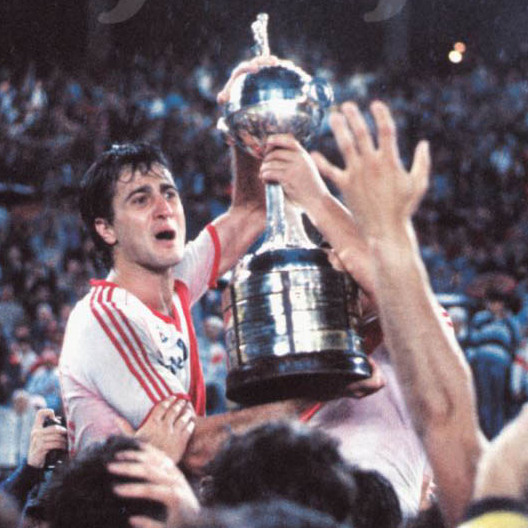
Norberto Alonso holding the trophy won in 1986, the first for the club

After the frustrations of 1966 and 1976, River Plate reached a third final in 1986 and was crowned champions for the first time after winning both legs of the final series against America de Cali, 2–1 at the Estadio Pascual Guerrero and 1–0 at Estadio Monumental.

Peñarol won the Cup for a fourth time in 1987 after beating América de Cali 2–1 in the decisive playoff; Forward Diego Aguirre scored in extra time of the playoff match to win the Cup. América de Cali entered the final for the third consecutive year. Nonetheless, they were once again the runners-up of the tournament.

it proved to be their last hurrah in the international scene as Uruguayan football, in general, suffered a great decline at the end of the 1980s. The Manyas fierce rivals, Nacional, also won one last cup in 1988 before falling from the continental limelight.

It was not until 1989 that a Pacific team finally broke the dominance of the established Atlantic powers. Atlético Nacional of Medellín won the final series, thus becoming the first team from Colombia to win the tournament. Atletico Nacional faced off against Olimpia losing the first leg in Asunción 2–0. Because Estadio Atanasio Girardot, their home stadium, did not have the minimum capacity CONMEBOL required to host a final, the second leg was played in Bogota's El Campín with the match ending 2–0 in favor of Atletico Nacional. Having tied the series, Atletico Nacional becomes that year's champions after winning a penalty shootout that required four rounds of sudden death. Goalkeeper René Higuita cemented his legendary status with an outstanding performance as he stopped four of the nine Paraguayan kicks and scored one himself. The 1989 edition also had another significant first: it was the first-ever time that no club from Argentina, Uruguay, or Brazil managed to reach the final. That trend would continue until 1992.

== 1990–99 ==
Having led Olimpia to the 1979 title as manager, Luis Cubilla returned to the club in 1988. With the legendary goalkeeper Ever Hugo Almeida, Gabriel González, Adriano Samaniego, and star Raul Vicente Amarilla, a rejuvenated decano boasted a formidable side that promised a return to the glory days of the late 1970s. After coming up short in 1989 against Atlético Nacional, Olimpia reached the 1990 Copa Libertadores finals after defeating the defending champion in a climactic semifinal series decided on penalties. In the finals, Olimpia defeated Barcelona of Ecuador 3–1 in aggregate to win their second title. Olimpia reached the 1991 Copa Libertadores finals, once again, defeating Atlético Nacional in the semifinals and facing Colo-Colo of Chile in the final. Led by Yugoslavian coach Mirko Jozić, the Chilean squad beat the defending champion 3–0. The defeat brought Olimpia's second golden era to a close.

In 1992, São Paulo rose from being a mere great in Brazil to become an international powerhouse. Manager Telê Santana turned to the Paulistas' youth and instilled his style of quick, cheerful, and decisive football. Led by stars such as Zetti, Müller, Raí, Cafu, Palhinha, São Paulo beat Newell's Old Boys of Argentina to begin a dynasty. In 1993 São Paulo successfully defended the title by thumping Universidad Católica of Chile in the finals.

The Brazilian side became the first club since Boca Juniors in 1978 to win 2 consecutive Copa Libertadores. Like Boca Juniors, however, they would reach another final in 1994 only to lose the title to Vélez Sársfield of Argentina in a penalty shoot-out.

With a compact tactical lineup and the goals of the duo Jardel and Paulo Nunes, Grêmio won the trophy again in 1995 after beating an Atlético Nacional led, once again, by the figure of René Higuita. Jardel finished the season as the top scorer with 12 goals. The team coached by Luiz Felipe Scolari was led by the defender (and captain) Adilson and the midfielder Arilson.

In the 1996 season, figures such as Hernán Crespo, Matías Almeyda and Enzo Francescoli helped River Plate secure its second title after defeating América de Cali in a rematch of the 1986 final.

The Copa Libertadores stayed on Brazilian soil for the remainder of the 1990s as Cruzeiro, Vasco da Gama and Palmeiras took the spoils. The cup of 1997 pitted Cruzeiro against Peruvian club Sporting Cristal. The key breakthrough came in the second leg of the final when Cruzeiro broke the deadlock with just under 15 minutes left in a match attended by over 106,000 spectators in the Mineirão. Vasco da Gama defeated Barcelona SC with ease to record their first title in 1998. The decade ended on a high note when Palmeiras and Deportivo Cali, both runners-up in the competition before, vied to become winners for the first time in 1999. The final was a dramatic back-and-forth match that went into penalties. Luiz Felipe Scolari managed to lead yet another club to victory as the Verdão won 4–3 in São Paulo.

This decade proved to be a major turning point in the history of the competition as the Copa Libertadores went through a great deal of growth and change. Having long been dominated by teams from Argentina, Brazil began to overshadow their neighbors as their clubs reached eight finals and won six titles in the 1990s.

From 1998 onwards, the Copa Libertadores was sponsored by Toyota and became known as the Copa Toyota Libertadores. That same year, Mexican clubs, although affiliated to CONCACAF, started taking part in the competition thanks to quotas obtained from the Pre-Libertadores which pitted Mexican and Venezuelan clubs against each other for two slots in the group stage. The tournament was expanded to 34 teams and economic incentives were introduced by an agreement between CONMEBOL and Toyota Motor Corporation. All teams that advanced to the second stage of the tournament received $25,000 for their participation.

== 2000–09: A decade of resurgences ==
During the 2000 edition, Boca Juniors returned to the top of the continent and raised the Copa Libertadores again after 22 years. Led by Carlos Bianchi, the Virrey, along with players like Mauricio Serna, Jorge Bermúdez, Óscar Córdoba, Juan Roman Riquelme, and Martín Palermo, among others, revitalized the club to establish it among the world's best. The Xeneizes started this legacy by defeating defending champion Palmeiras in the final series. The road to the final included a winning series against arch-rival River Plate, where Martín Palermo scored the third goal for the 3–0 victory in La Bombonera, becoming one of his most celebrated and remembered goals. Carlos Bianchi also won his second Copa Libertadores in Brazil, after winning the title as manager of Vélez Sarsfield in 1994.

Boca Juniors won the 2001 edition after, once again, defeating Palmeiras in the semifinals and Cruz Azul in the final series to successfully defend the trophy. After Cruz Azul won 1–0 in the second leg at La Bombonera, a penalty shoot-out was needed to define a champion. Boca Juniors won 3–1 after the Mexican team missed three penalties. Cruz Azul became the first ever Mexican club to reach the final and win a final leg after great performances against River Plate (3–0) and Rosario Central (5–2 on aggregate). The team had notable players such as forwards José Saturnino Cardozo and Francisco Palencia, and their performance in the competition was praised by the Argentine media.

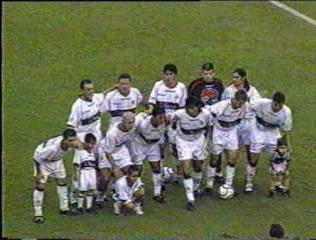
An Olimpia squad of 2002. That year, the Paraguayan team won their third trophy

Like their predecessors from the late 1970s however, Boca Juniors would fall short of winning three consecutive titles. As with Juan Carlos Lorenzo's men, the Xeneizes became frustrated as they were eliminated by Olimpia, this time during the quarterfinals. Led by World Cup winner-turned manager Nery Pumpido, Olimpia would overcome Grêmio (after some controversy) and surprise finalists São Caetano. Despite this triumph, Olimpia did not create the winning mystique of its past golden generations and bowed out in the round of 16 the following season, after being routed by Grêmio 6–2, avenging their controversial loss from the year before.

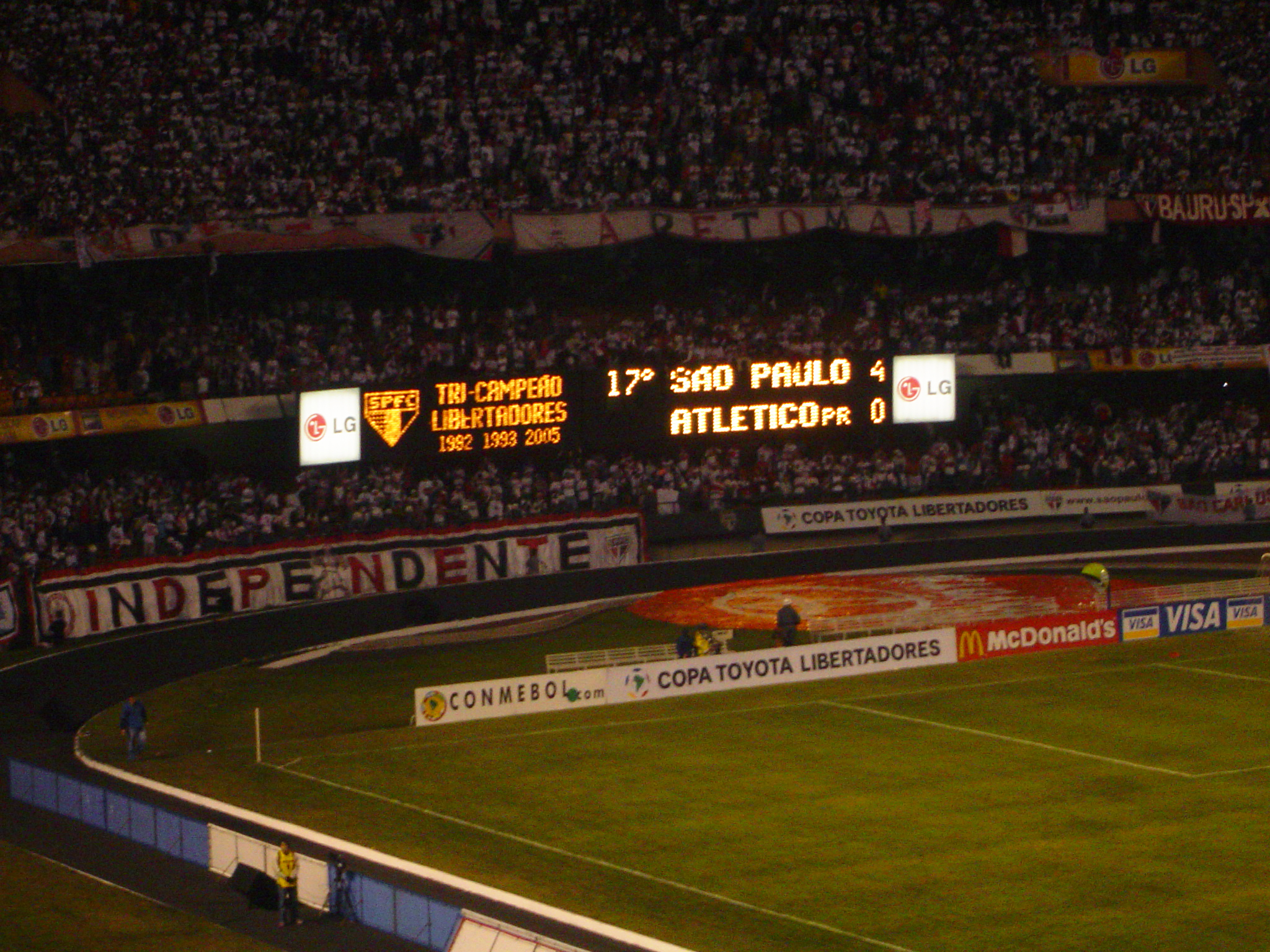
View of the supporters and scoreboard "São Paulo 4 v Athletico Paranaense 0" during the 2005 final. The Paulista team became tri-campeão of the competition

The 2003 tournament was known for performances by teams such as América de Cali, River Plate, Grêmio, Cobreloa, and Racing, among others. Media reports indicate the perception was that these teams were bringing their most skilled sides in generations and unexpected teams such as Independiente Medellín and Paysandu became revelations in what was considered a high quality year Copa Libertadores's history. The biggest news of the competition was previous champion Santos. Qualifying to the tournament as Brazilian champion, coached by Emerson Leão and containing well known figures such as Renato, Alex, Léo, Ricardo Oliveira, Diego, Robinho, and Elano, the Santásticos became a symbol of entertaining and offensive football that resembled Pelé's generation of the 1960s. Boca Juniors once again found talent in their ranks to fill the gap left by the very successful group of 2000–2001. The team conissted of upcoming stars Rolando Schiavi, Roberto Abbondanzieri and Carlos Tevez. Boca Juniors and Santos would eventually meet in a rematch of the 1963 final; Boca avenged the 1963 loss by defeating Santos in both legs of the final. Carlos Bianchi won the Cup for a fourth time and became the most successful manager in the competition's history and Boca Juniors hailed themselves pentacampeones. Boca reached their fourth final in five tournaments in 2004 but was beaten by surprise-outfit Once Caldas of Colombia, ending this generation of Boca Junior's players success at the tournament. Once Caldas, employing a conservative and defensive style of football, became the second Colombian side to win the competition.

Ruing their semifinal exit in 2004, São Paulo made an outstanding comeback in 2005 to contest the final with Atlético Paranaense. This became the first ever Copa Libertadores finals to feature two teams from the same football association; The Tricolor won their third crown after thrashing Atlético Paranaense in the final leg. The 2006 final was also an all-Brazilian affair, with defending champions São Paulo lining up against Internacional. Led by team captain Fernandão, the Colorados beat São Paulo 2–1 at Estádio do Morumbi and held the defending champions at a 2–2 draw at home in Porto Alegre as Internacional won their first ever title.

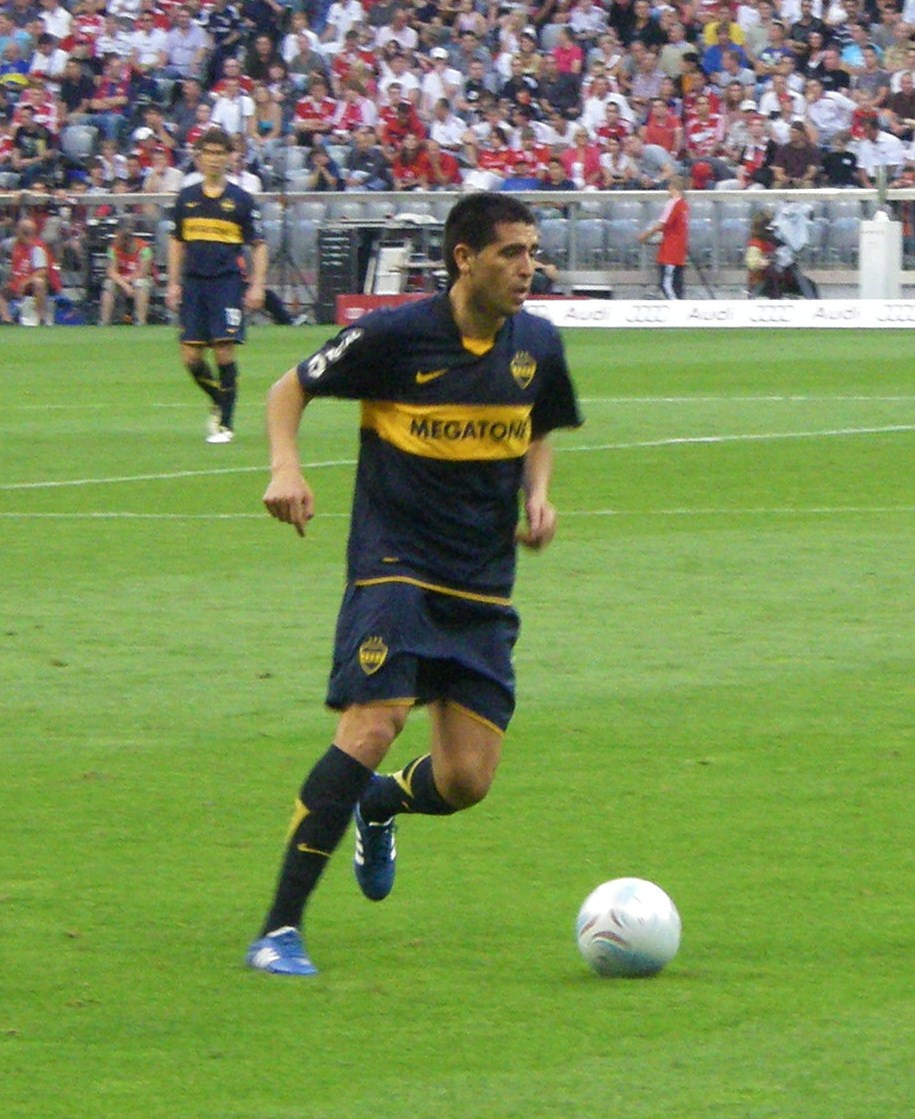
Román Riquelme was both, top scorer and best player of his team to win the 2007 Copa Libertadores

Internacional's arch-rivals, Grêmio, surprised many by reaching the 2007 final with a relatively young squad. However, it was not to be as Boca Juniors, reinforced by aging but still-capable players, came away with the trophy to win their sixth title. Boca Juniors, managed by Miguel Ángel Russo (who win his first Copa Libertadores title) and led by Román Riquelme at the peek of his career with outstanding performances that included three goals in the final series, beat Gremio 5–0 in aggregate. Riquelme was also Boca Juniors' topscorer with 8 goals (and the second of the entire competition).

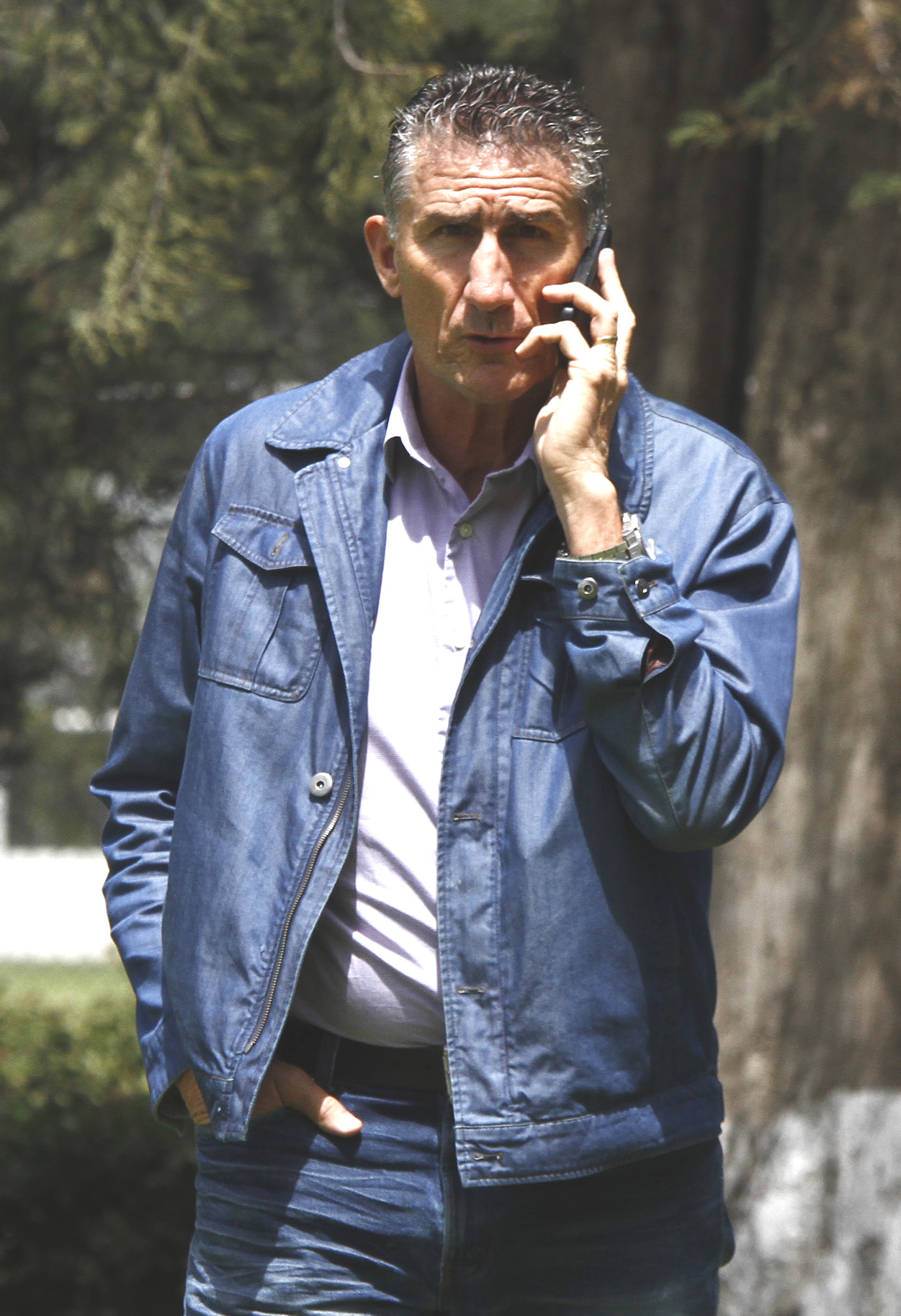
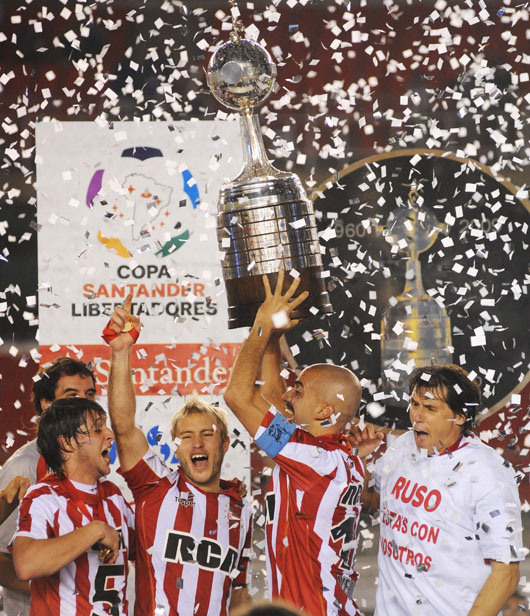
(Left) Coach Edgardo Bauza led LDU Quito to become the first Ecuadorian club to win a Copa Libertadores; (right): Players of Estudiantes LP in 2009 celebrating a new title after 39 years, the fourth for the club

In 2008 the tournament severed its relationship with Toyota. Grupo Santander, one of the largest banks in the world, became the sponsor of the Copa Libertadores, and thus the official name changed to "Copa Santander Libertadores". In that season, LDU Quito became the first team from Ecuador to win the Copa Libertadores after defeating Fluminense 3–1 on penalties. Goalkeeper José Francisco Cevallos played a key role, saving three penalties in the final shootout in what is considered one of the best final series in the competition's history. It was also the highest-scoring final in the history of the tournament.

The biggest resurgence of the decade happened in the 50th edition of the Copa Libertadores and it was won by a former power that has reinvented itself. Estudiantes de La Plata, led by Juan Sebastián Verón, won their fourth title 39 long years after the successful generation of the 1960s (led by Juan Sebastián's father, Juan Ramón). The pincharatas managed to emulate their predecessors by defeating Cruzeiro 2–1 on the return leg in Belo Horizonte.

== 2010–19 ==
In 2010, a spell of the competition only being won by Brazilian clubs for four years began with Internacional to win their second Copa Libertadores after defeating Guadalajara (mostly known for its nickname The Chivas), the second Mexican club to reach a Copa Libertadores final. The Mexican side, which suffered the absence of several players called up for the Mexico national team, played the finals after eliminating Vélez Sarsfield, Libertad, and U de Chile but lost to Inter, which won both legs for an aggregate score of 5–3.

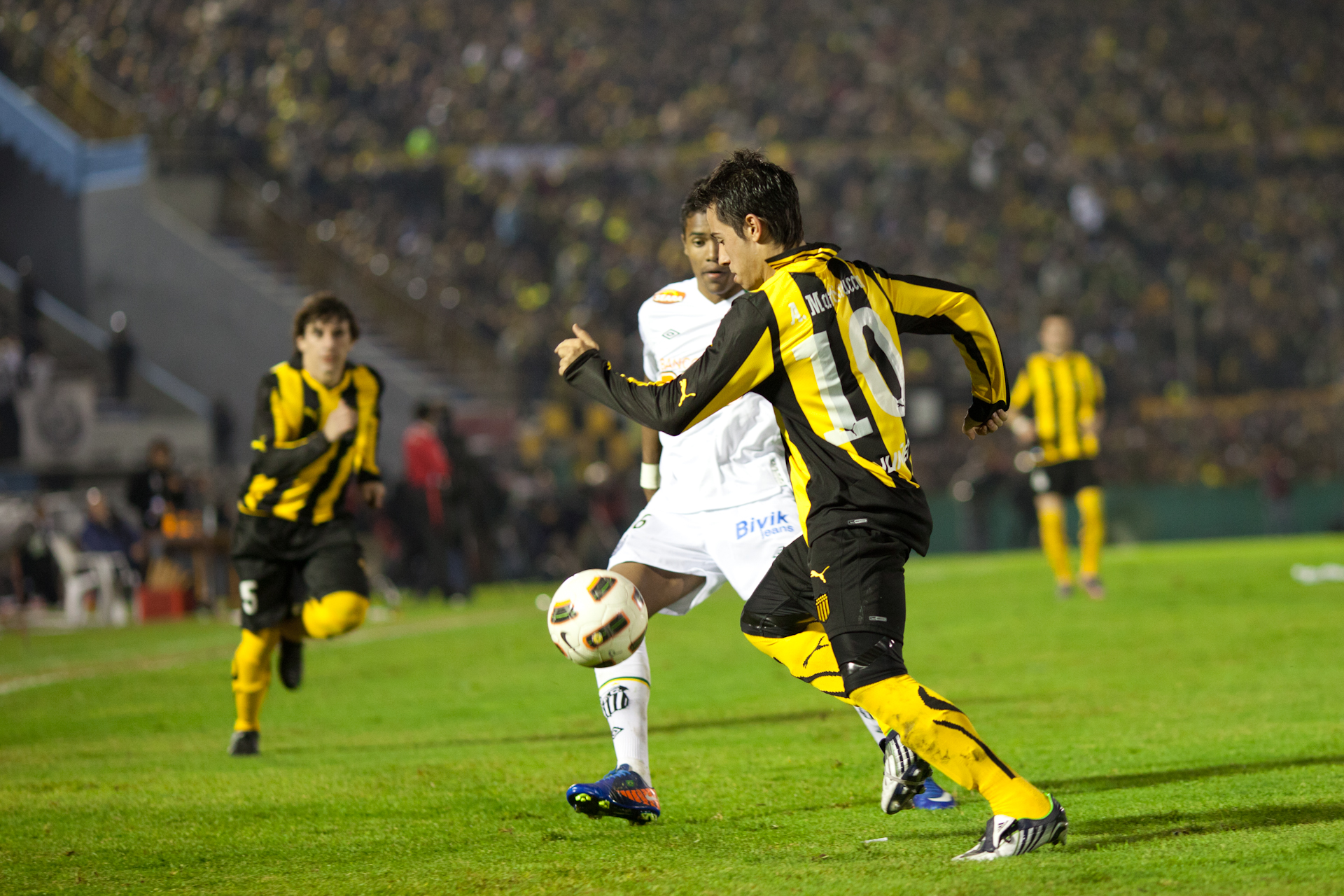
A moment of the Santos v Peñarol final in 2011. The Brazilian team would win the cup

In 2011 and led by rising star Neymar, Santos won their third trophy after his glorious years in the early 1960s, overcoming Peñarol by 2–1 in the second leg after a 0–0 tie in the first match.

In 2012, Corinthians won its first Copa Libertadores, also finishing the tournament undefeated. The squad beat Boca Juniors (which had reached their 6th. final since 2000) 2–0 at Pacaembu Stadium after the first match ended 1–1 at La Bombonera. It was also the first Copa Libertadores final contested by the Timão.

In 2013, Atlético Mineiro (with superstar Ronaldinho, who had signed for the club one year before) needed to beat Paraguayan Olimpia 2–0 in the second leg to take the match to extra time and then a penalty shootout; Mineiro's goalkeeper Victor helped secure their first title after stopping Herminio Miranda's shot.

The Brazilian spell ended with San Lorenzo de Almagro's first title in 2014, when the Santos beat Paraguayan Club Nacional to achieve a long-standing aim for the club. Until then, San Lorenzo was the only of the Big Five which had not been won the competition. The team was coached by Edgardo Bauza, who won his second Libertadores after his first win with LDU Quito six years before.

Another Argentine team, River Plate, won its third title in 2015, defeating Mexican Tigres UANL (the third club from this country to reach a final) in the finals. River Plate's road to the final include a controversial series v Boca Juniors, with the Xeneize being disqualifyied by Conmebol after the second leg was suspended for incidents. The body awarded points to River Plate so they advances to quarter-finals.

Colombian team Atlético Nacional won their second continental title in 2016 after beating Ecuador's Independiente del Valle 2–1 on aggregate. The Ecuadorian team had become the sensation team when they eliminated both most popular teams of Argentina, River Plate (in round of 16) and Boca Juniors (in semifinals). Atlético Nacional won the cup with only 6 goals awarded in 13 matches. Marlos Moreno was the top scorer of the team with 4 goals.

Grêmio won the competition for the third time in its history in 2017 after defeating Lanús in the final, having won both legs for a 3–1 aggregate. In their road to the final, Lanús had eliminated fellow teams San Lorenzo and River Plate but lost to a Brazilian team which showed an offensive style which allowed them to bring the cup back to Brazil after three years. The Brazilian side was managed by Renato Gaúcho, who achieved two Copa Libertadores with Gremio, as manager and as player (in 1983).

In 2018, River Plate went on to beat their archrivals Boca Juniors 3–1 in a return leg at the Santiago Bernabéu Stadium in Madrid, Spain, for the very first time in history due to the lack of security in Buenos Aires resulting from the attack on the bus of Boca Juniors prior to the match. This was the last final to take place over two legs, as starting from 2019 the final would be played as a single match at a venue chosen in advance.

Due to the intense rivalry between Boca and River, the match was referred to as the "Superfinal", and "the Final to end all Finals". The press called it the "most important final in Argentina's football history".

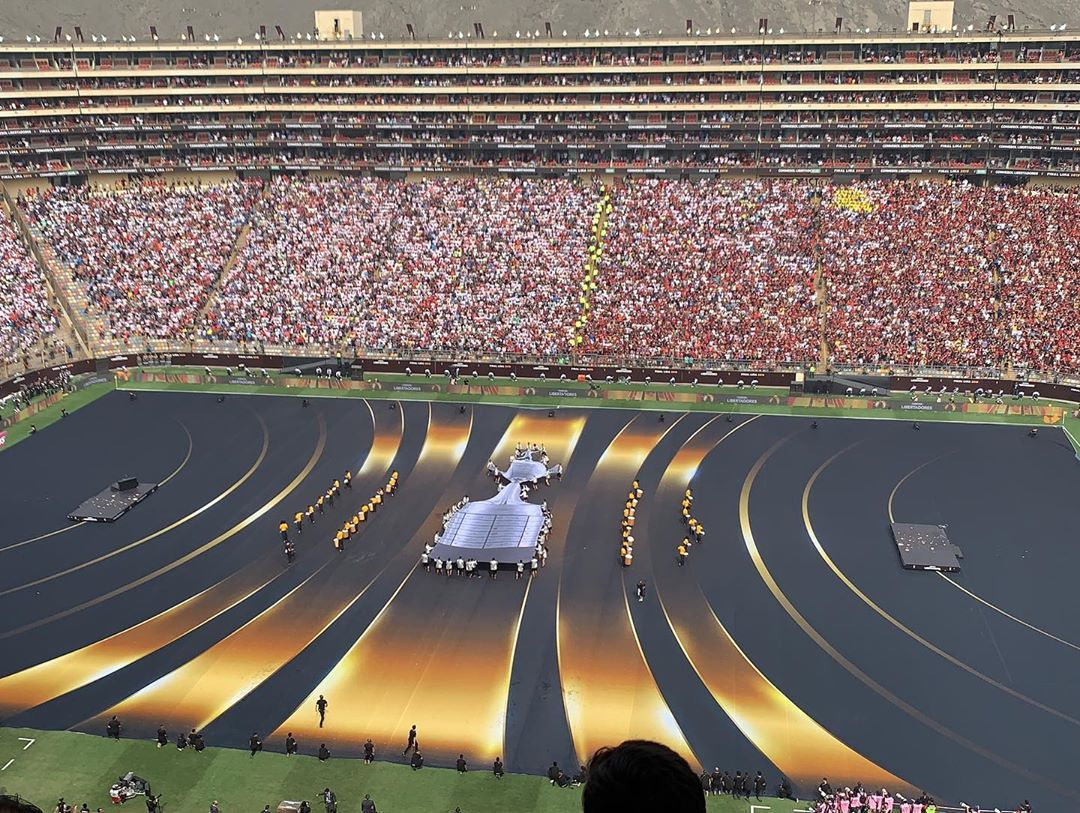
Opening ceremony of the 2019 final where Flamengo beat River Plate 2–1, scoring two goals in the last minutes of the match

The 2019 edition held the first Copa Libertadores final to be played as a single match in a neutral venue, in this case the Estadio Monumental of Lima. In 2016, CONMEBOL proposed that the Copa Libertadores final be played as a single match instead of over two legs. It was only on 23 February 2018 that CONMEBOL was able to confirm that the 2019 final onwards would be played as a single match at a venue chosen in advance, and on 11 June 2018 set the date of the match as 23 November 2019. With the Argentine and Brazilian cities banned by CONMEBOL for this bidding, three national associations had officialized interest in hosting the 2019 Copa Libertadores Final.

In the final, Brazilian Flamengo beat reigning champions River Plate 2–1 in front an attendance of more than 78,000. After being placed at disadvantage the most part of the match, Flamengo's forward Gabriel Barbosa scored two goals in the last three minutes to overcome their rival and win their second Copa Libertadores. Because of what happened during the game and especially its unexpected ending, the match was regarded as "one of the most dramatic finals of all time".

== 2020–onwards ==
The decade started with a Brazilian predominance in the first two editions. 2020 saw Palmeiras to lift its second trophy as it defeated São Paulo state rivals Santos 1–0. Breno Lopes scored the winner in stoppage time in the second half, soon after Santos' manager was sent off due to time-wasting.

Palmeiras won their third Copa Libertadores title in 2021, becoming the first team to win two Libertadores in the same year, after defeating Flamengo 2–1 after extra time, with a late winner from Deyverson.

== See also ==
- Records and statistics of the Copa Libertadores
- List of Copa Libertadores finals
- Copa Libertadores de América Topscorers
