= Miltão =

Brazilian footballer

Personal information
- Full name: José Milton Benedito
- Date of birth: 1 July 1950
- Place of birth: Brazil
- Date of death: 22 December 2003 (aged 53)
- Place of death: Volta Redonda, RJ, Brazil
- Position: Forward

Youth career
- Estrela de Piquete

Senior career*
Years	Team	Apps	(Gls)
1974	Tiradentes	15	(5)
1975–1978	Sport Recife	66	(22)
1977	→ Bahia (loan)		
1978–1979	Guarani	43	(15)
1980–1983	Vila Nova	21	(1)
1984	Tuna Luso	9	
1990	Volta Redonda		
- * Club domestic league appearances and goals

José Milton Benedito, also known as Miltão (1 July 1950 – 22 December 2003) was a Brazilian professional football player. He has been the topscorer of the 1979 Copa Libertadores with 6 goals.

== Club career ==
After having played at youth level for Estrela de Piquete, a small club based in the São Paulo state, he transferred to Sociedade Esportiva Tiradentes, a Piauí club that played in the first level of Brazilian football. His first season in the Brasileirão (which was then simply called Campeonato Nacional, National Championship) was the 1974 tournament. He then moved to Sport Recife, and he stayed there for 4 seasons, playing 66 games and scoring 22 goals. In 1979, he played for Guarani, both in the National championship (only 2 appearances) and the Copa Libertadores: during the latter tournament he scored 6 goals, finishing as the topscorer along Peruvian Juan José Oré. After his experience with Guarani, he played for Vila Nova, a Goiânia-based club, and he played one last season in Série A with Tuna Luso in 1984.
