= Unión Deportiva Valdez =

Valdez
- Full name: Unión Deportiva Valdez
- Founded: 1915; 110 years ago
- Dissolved: 1997
- Ground: Estadio Los Chirijos; Milagro, Ecuador
- Capacity: 20,000
Home colours

Unión Deportiva Valdez was an Ecuadorian football club based in Milagro, Guayas. Founded in 1915, it played one season in the top-flight Serie A in 1978. It dissolved in 1997.

== Achievements ==
- Serie B
  - Runner-up (1): 1978 E1
- Campeonato Professional de Guayaquil
  - Champion (2): 1953, 1954
