= 1979 Copa Libertadores =

20th season of Copa Libertadores

1979 Copa Libertadores de América
Tournament details
- Dates: February 24 – July 27
- Teams: 21 (from 10 associations)

Final positions
- Champions: (Paraguay) Olimpia (1st title)
- Runners-up: (Argentina) Boca Juniors

Tournament statistics
- Matches played: 75
- Goals scored: 212 (2.83 per match)

The 1979 Copa Libertadores represented the 20th edition of the tournament, which saw Olimpia of Paraguay win the title for the first time. They defeated the defending champions, Boca Juniors of Argentina. Olimpia's title was the first instance of a team from a country other than Uruguay, Argentina or Brazil winning Copa Libertadores. This allowed the Paraguayan side to play the Intercontinental Cup against Malmö FF of Sweden, in which the South American side won.

== Qualified teams ==
Country	Team	Qualify method
CONMEBOL (1 berth)	Boca Juniors	1978 Copa Libertadores champion
Argentina; 2 berths	Independiente	1978 Campeonato Nacional champions
Argentina; 2 berths	Quilmes	1978 Campeonato Metropolitano champions
Bolivia; 2 berths	Bolívar	1978 Primera División champion
Bolivia; 2 berths	Jorge Wilstermann	1978 Primera División runner-up
Brazil; 2 berths	Guarani	1978 Campeonato Brasileiro Série A champion
Brazil; 2 berths	Palmeiras	1978 Campeonato Brasileiro Série A 2nd place
Chile; 2 berths	Palestino	1978 Primera División champion
Chile; 2 berths	O'Higgins	1978 Liguilla Pre-Copa Libertadores winner
Colombia; 2 berths	Millonarios	1978 Campeonato Profesional champion
Colombia; 2 berths	Deportivo Cali	1978 Campeonato Profesional runner-up
Ecuador; 2 berths	El Nacional	1978 Campeonato Ecuatoriano de Fútbol Serie A champion
Ecuador; 2 berths	Técnico Universitario	1978 Campeonato Ecuatoriano de Fútbol Serie A runner-up
Paraguay; 2 berths	Olimpia	1978 Primera División runner-up
Paraguay; 2 berths	Sol de América	1978 Primera División third place
Peru; 2 berths	Alianza Lima	1978 Torneo Descentralizado champion
Peru; 2 berths	Universitario	1978 Torneo Descentralizado runner-up
Uruguay; 2 berths	Peñarol	1978 Liguilla Pre-Libertadores winner
Uruguay; 2 berths	Nacional	1978 Liguilla Pre-Libertadores runner-up
Venezuela; 2 berths	Portuguesa	1978 Primera División champion
Venezuela; 2 berths	Deportivo Galicia	1978 Primera División runner-up

== Draw ==
The champions and runners-up of each football association were drawn into the same group along with another football association's participating teams. Three clubs from Argentina competed as Boca Juniors was champion of the 1978 Copa Libertadores. They entered the tournament in the Semifinals.

Group 1	Group 2	Group 3	Group 4	Group 5
Argentina; Colombia	Bolivia; Paraguay	Brazil; Peru	Chile; Venezuela	Ecuador; Uruguay

== Group stage ==
=== Group 1 ===
Pos	Team	Pld	W	D	L	GF	GA	GD	Pts	Qualification	(Argentina) IND	(Colombia) CAL	(Colombia) MIL	(Argentina) QUI
1	(Argentina) Independiente	6	4	1	1	12	6	+6	9	Qualified to the Semifinals	—	1–0	4–1	2–0
2	(Colombia) Deportivo Cali	6	3	1	2	8	7	+1	7		1–0	—	2–0	3–2
3	(Colombia) Millonarios	6	2	2	2	8	11	−3	6		3–3	1–1	—	1–0
4	(Argentina) Quilmes	6	1	0	5	7	11	−4	2		1–2	3–1	1–2	—

Legend: Blue = home team win; Yellow = draw; Red = away team win.

=== Group 2 ===
Pos	Team	Pld	W	D	L	GF	GA	GD	Pts	Qualification	(Paraguay) OLI	(Bolivia) BOL	(Paraguay) SOL	(Bolivia) WIL
1	(Paraguay) Olimpia	6	5	0	1	13	5	+8	10	Qualified to the Semifinals	—	3–0	2–1	4–2
2	(Bolivia) Bolívar	6	4	1	1	18	7	+11	9		2–1	—	4–1	4–0
3	(Paraguay) Sol de América	6	2	1	3	9	12	−3	5		0–1	2–2	—	2–1
4	(Bolivia) Jorge Wilstermann	6	0	0	6	5	21	−16	0		0–2	0–6	2–3	—

Legend: Blue = home team win; Yellow = draw; Red = away team win.

=== Group 3 ===
Pos	Team	Pld	W	D	L	GF	GA	GD	Pts	Qualification	(Brazil) GUA	(Peru) UNI	(Brazil) PAL	(Peru) ALI
1	(Brazil) Guarani	6	5	0	1	16	5	+11	10	Qualified to the Semifinals	—	6–1	1–0	2–0
2	(Peru) Universitario	6	4	0	2	15	15	0	8		3–0	—	2–5	1–0
3	(Brazil) Palmeiras	6	3	0	3	15	11	+4	6		1–4	1–2	—	4–0
4	(Peru) Alianza Lima	6	0	0	6	5	20	−15	0		0–3	3–6	2–4	—

Legend: Blue = home team win; Yellow = draw; Red = away team win.

=== Group 4 ===
Pos	Team	Pld	W	D	L	GF	GA	GD	Pts	Qualification	(Chile) PAL	(Chile) OHI	(Venezuela) POR	(Venezuela) GAL
1	(Chile) Palestino	6	4	2	0	16	2	+14	10	Qualified to the Semifinals	—	1–0	6–0	5–0
2	(Chile) O'Higgins	6	2	3	1	10	4	+6	7		1–1	—	1–1	6–0
3	(Venezuela) Portuguesa	6	0	4	2	4	12	−8	4		0–2	1–1	—	1–1
4	(Venezuela) Deportivo Galicia	6	0	3	3	3	15	−12	3		1–1	0–1	1–1	—

Legend: Blue = home team win; Yellow = draw; Red = away team win.

=== Group 5 ===
Pos	Team	Pld	W	D	L	GF	GA	GD	Pts	Qualification	(Uruguay) PEÑ	(Uruguay) NAC	(Ecuador) ENA	(Ecuador) TEC
1	(Uruguay) Peñarol	6	4	2	0	10	2	+8	10	Qualified to the Semifinals	—	0–0	2–1	4–0
2	(Uruguay) Nacional	6	2	3	1	7	3	+4	7		1–1	—	3–0	2–0
3	(Ecuador) El Nacional	6	2	1	3	6	10	−4	5		0–2	1–0	—	2–1
4	(Ecuador) Técnico Universitario	6	0	2	4	4	12	−8	2		0–1	1–1	2–2	—

Legend: Blue = home team win; Yellow = draw; Red = away team win.

== Semifinals ==
=== Group A ===
Pos	Team	Pld	W	D	L	GF	GA	GD	Pts	Qualification	(Argentina) BOC	(Argentina) IND	(Uruguay) PEÑ
1	(Argentina) Boca Juniors	4	2	1	1	3	1	+2	5	Qualified to the Final	—	2–0	1–0
2	(Argentina) Independiente	4	2	1	1	2	2	0	5		1–0	—	1–0
3	(Uruguay) Peñarol	4	0	2	2	0	2	−2	2		0–0	0–0	—

Legend: Blue = home team win; Yellow = draw; Red = away team win.

==== Tiebreaker ====
Team 1	Score	Team 2
Boca Juniors (Argentina)	1–0	(Argentina) Independiente

=== Group B ===
Pos	Team	Pld	W	D	L	GF	GA	GD	Pts	Qualification	(Paraguay) OLI	(Brazil) GUA	(Chile) PAL
1	(Paraguay) Olimpia	4	3	1	0	8	2	+6	7	Qualified to the Final	—	2–1	3–0
2	(Brazil) Guarani	4	0	3	1	4	5	−1	3		1–1	—	2–2
3	(Chile) Palestino	4	0	2	2	2	7	−5	2		0–2	0–0	—

Legend: Blue = home team win; Yellow = draw; Red = away team win.

== Finals ==
Team 1	Agg.	Team 2	1st leg	2nd leg
Olimpia (Paraguay)	2–0	(Argentina) Boca Juniors	2–0	0–0

== Champion ==
Copa Libertadores
1979 Champions

Olimpia
First Title

== Top-scorers ==
6 goals
Juan José Oré (Universitario)
Miltão (Guaraní)
