= 2005 Recopa Sudamericana =

Boca Juniors	Once Caldas
(Argentina)	(Colombia)
4	3
- (on aggregate)

First leg
Boca Juniors	Once Caldas
3	1
- Date: August 24, 2005
- Venue: Alberto J. Armando, Buenos Aires
- Referee: Carlos Chandía (Chile)
- Attendance: 45,000

Second leg
Once Caldas	Boca Juniors
2	1
- Date: August 31, 2005
- Venue: Estadio Palogrande, Manizales
- Referee: Jorge Larrionda (Uruguay)
- Attendance: 30,000

The 2005 Recopa Sudamericana (officially the 2005 Recopa Fox Sports Sudamericana for sponsorship reasons) was the 13th Recopa Sudamericana, an annual football match between the winners of the previous season's Copa Libertadores and Copa Sudamericana competitions. From this edition forward, the Recopa Sudamericana will be contested over two legs.

The match was contested by Once Caldas, winners of the 2004 Copa Libertadores, and Boca Juniors, winners of the 2004 Copa Sudamericana and appearing in a second, consecutive final. In a rematch of the Copa Libertadores final in 2004, Boca Juniors managed to avenge that defeat and win their second Recopa Sudamericana after beating Once Caldas 4-3 on goal aggregate.

== Qualified teams ==
Team	Previous finals app.
(Argentina) Boca Juniors	**1990**, 2004
(Colombia) Once Caldas	None

- **Bold** indicates winning years

== Venues ==
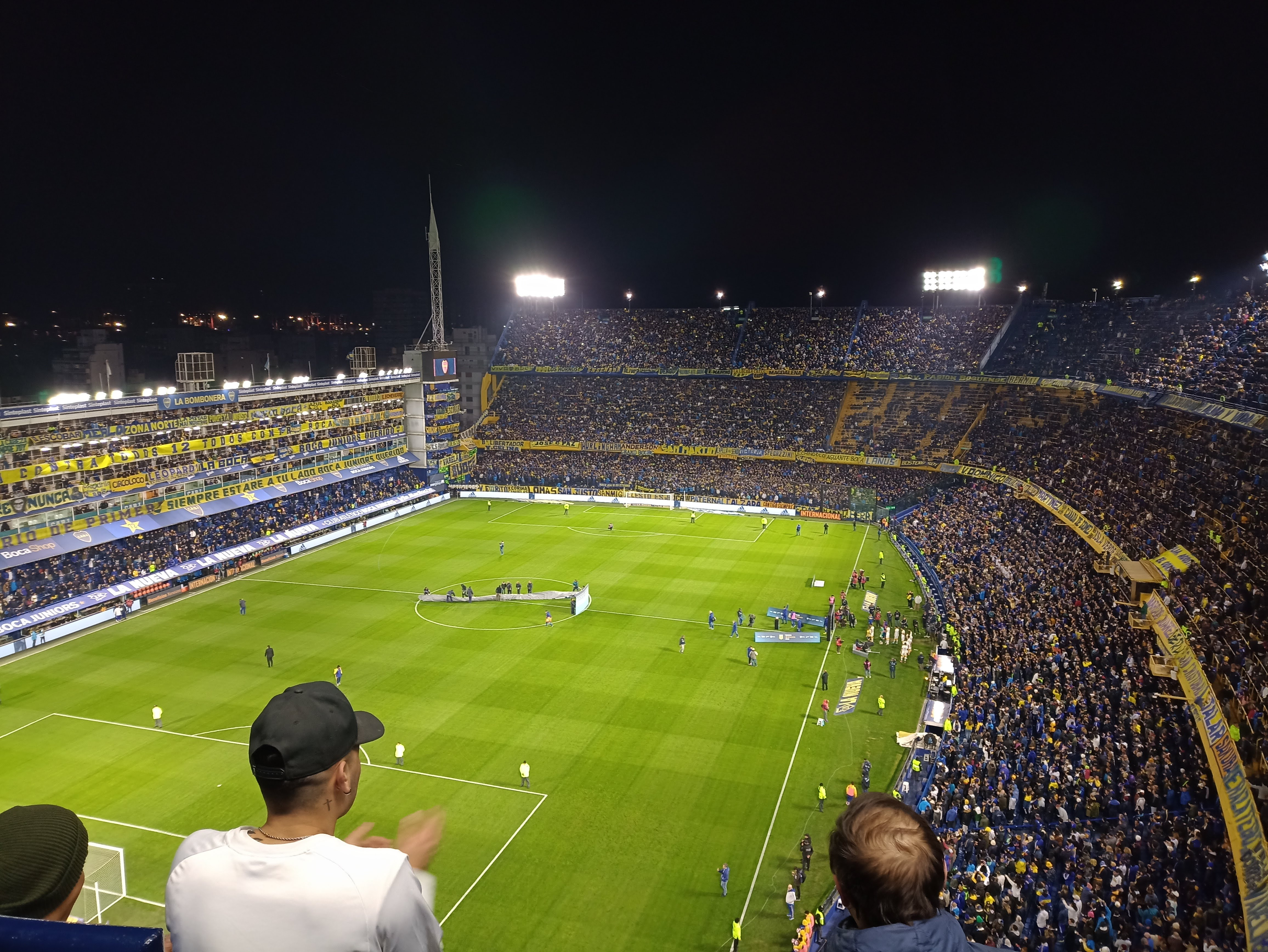
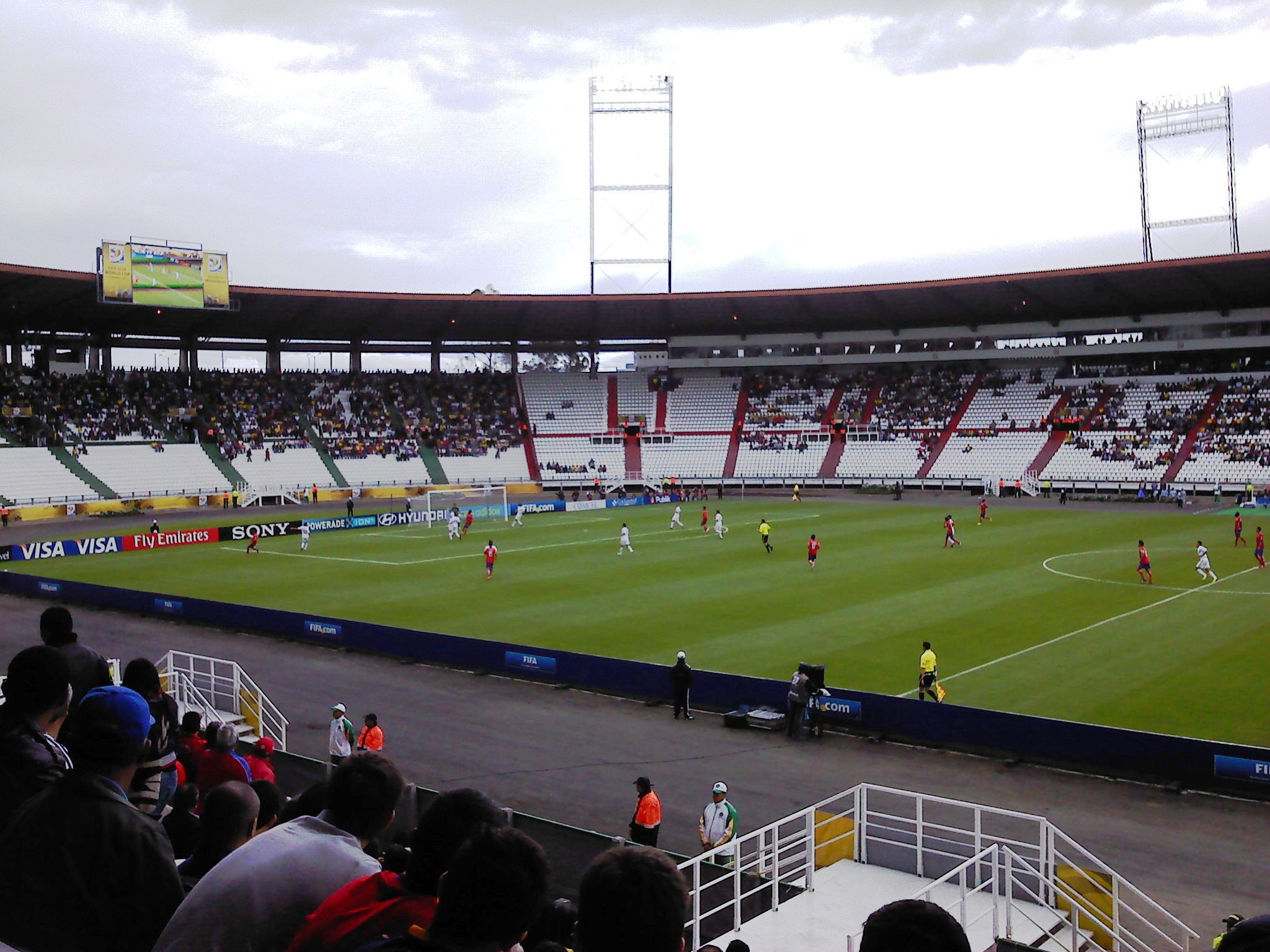
La Bombonera (left) and Estadio Palogrande, venues for the series

== Match details ==
=== First leg ===
2005 Recopa Sudamericana
August 24, 2005
21:00 (UTC-3)
First leg

Boca Juniors (Argentina)	3−1	(Colombia) Once Caldas
Battaglia 3'; Cardozo 8'; González 18' (o.g.)	Report	Casierra 42'

Alberto J. Armando, Buenos Aires
Attendance: 45,000
Referee: Carlos Chandía (Chile)

**Boca Juniors**	**Once Caldas**

GK	1	(Argentina) Roberto Abbondanzieri
DF	4	(Argentina) Hugo Ibarra	(yellow card) 68'
DF	6	(Argentina) Daniel Díaz
DF	2	(Argentina) Rolando Schiavi
DF	3	(Argentina) Juan Krupoviesa
MF	8	(Argentina) Sebastián Battaglia (c)
MF	5	(Argentina) Fernando Gago
MF	19	(Argentina) Neri Cardozo		(substituted off) 79'
MF	10	(Argentina) Federico Insúa		(substituted off) 75'
FW	14	(Argentina) Rodrigo Palacio		(substituted off) 87'
FW	9	(Argentina) Daniel Bilos
Substitutes:
MF	11	(Colombia) Fabián Vargas		(substituted on) 75'
MF	20	(Argentina) Diego Cagna		(substituted on) 79'
DF	7	(Argentina) Guillermo B. Schelotto		(substituted on) 87'
Manager:
(Argentina) Alfio Basile

GK	1	(Colombia) Julián Mesa
DF	15	(Colombia) Wilmer Díaz
DF	13	(Colombia) Édgar Cataño (c)	(yellow card) 85'
DF	21	(Colombia) Juan Diego González
DF	19	(Colombia) Mauricio Casierra	(yellow card) 28'
MF	23	(Colombia) Andrés Casañas		(substituted off) 23'
MF	14	(Colombia) Diego Arango
MF	3	(Colombia) Leonel Vielma
MF	16	(Colombia) Elkin Soto
MF	10	(Chile) Gamadiel García	(yellow card) 32'	(substituted off) 46'
FW	20	(Colombia) Édison Chará	(yellow card) 68'	(substituted off) 75'
Substitutes:
MF	8	(Colombia) Arnulfo Valentierra		(substituted on) 23'
FW	9	(Uruguay) Ismael Espiga		(substituted on) 46'
FW	17	(Colombia) Dayro Moreno		(substituted on) 75'
Manager:
(Colombia) Carlos Alberto Valencia

Assistant referees:
(Chile) Rodrigo González
(Chile) Lorenzo Acuña
Fourth official:
(Chile) Rubén Selmán

=== Second leg ===
August 31, 2005
19:45 (UTC-5)
Second leg

Once Caldas (Colombia)	2−1	(Argentina) Boca Juniors
Chará 8'; Velázquez 77'	Report	Schiavi 60'

Estadio Palogrande, Manizales
Attendance: 30,000
Referee: Jorge Larrionda (Uruguay)

**Once Caldas**	**Boca Juniors**

GK	12	(Colombia) Rolando Ramírez
DF	15	(Colombia) Wilmer Díaz
DF	13	(Colombia) Édgar Cataño (c)	(yellow card) 85'
DF	21	(Colombia) Juan Diego González
DF	19	(Colombia) Mauricio Casierra		(substituted off) 64'
MF	23	(Colombia) Andrés Casañas	(red card) 72'
MF	5	(Colombia) Rubén Velásquez
MF	16	(Colombia) Elkin Soto
MF	8	(Colombia) Arnulfo Valentierra
MF	10	(Colombia) Édison Chará	(red card) 44'
FW	20	(Uruguay) Ismael Espiga		(substituted off) 58'
Substitutes:
FW	17	(Colombia) Dayro Moreno		(substituted on) 58'
FW	7	(Argentina) Cristian Ruiz		(substituted on) 64'
Manager:
(Colombia) Juan Carlos Bedoya

GK	1	(Argentina) Roberto Abbondanzieri
DF	4	(Argentina) Hugo Ibarra
DF	6	(Argentina) Daniel Díaz
DF	2	(Argentina) Rolando Schiavi	(yellow card) 28'
DF	3	(Argentina) Juan Krupoviesa
MF	8	(Argentina) Sebastián Battaglia (c)	(red card) 78'
MF	5	(Argentina) Fernando Gago	(yellow card) 73'
MF	19	(Argentina) Neri Cardozo		(substituted off) 82'
MF	11	(Colombia) Fabián Vargas		(substituted off) 46'
FW	16	(Argentina) Marcelo Delgado		(substituted off) 76'
FW	9	(Argentina) Daniel Bilos
Substitutes:
MF	10	(Argentina) Federico Insúa		(substituted on) 46'
FW	14	(Argentina) Rodrigo Palacio		(substituted on) 76'
MF	20	(Argentina) Diego Cagna		(substituted on) 82'
Manager:
(Argentina) Alfio Basile

Assistant referees:
(Uruguay) Wálter Rial
(Uruguay) Fernando Cresci
Fourth official:
(Uruguay) Roberto Silvera
