= 2009 Copa Chile =

Tournament details
- Country: Chile
- Teams: 81

Final positions
- Champions: Unión San Felipe
- Runners-up: Municipal Iquique

Tournament statistics
- Top goal scorer: Angel Vildozo (5 goals)

The 2009 Copa Chile was the 30th edition of the competition. The competition started on May 10, 2009 with the preliminary round and concluded on November 15, 2009 with the Final. The winner qualifies for the 2010 Copa Sudamericana.

== Schedule ==
Round	Date	Number of fixtures	Clubs	New entries this round
Preliminary round	May 10, 2009; May 17, 2009	6	81 → 75	12 Regional Amateur Champions
First round	May 24, 2009; June 7, 2009	11	75 → 64	16 Tercera B Clubs; 1 Regional Amateur Champion
Second round	June 10, 2009; June 29, 2009	6	64 → 58	1 Tercera B Club
Third Round	June 10, 2009; June 29, 2009	11	58 → 47	16 Tercera Division Clubs; 2 Regional Amateur Champions
Fourth Round	August 5, 2009; August 19, 2009	15	47 → 32	1 Primera Division Club; 14 Primera B Clubs; 1 Provincial Amateur Team
Fifth Round	August 26, 2009; September 16, 2009	16	32 → 16	17 Primera Division Clubs
Round of 16	September 30, 2009; October 13, 2009	8	16 → 8	-
Quarterfinals	October 21, 2009; November 3, 2009	4	8 → 4	-
Semifinals	November 11, 2009	2	4 → 2	-
Final	November 15, 2009	1	2 → 1	-

== Teams ==
A record 82 clubs were accepted for the competition; one club, Luis Matte Larrain, folded before the fixtures were released, leaving 81 clubs to appear in the draw. The teams for this edition are the teams from the Primera Division, Primera B, Tercera Division, regional amateur club champions, and selected amateur teams.

=== Primera División ===
- Audax Italiano
- Cobreloa
- Cobresal
- Colo-Colo
- Curicó Unido
- Deportes La Serena
- Everton
- Huachipato
- Municipal Iquique
- Ñublense
- O'Higgins
- Palestino
- Rangers
- Santiago Morning
- Unión Española
- Universidad Católica
- Universidad de Chile
- Universidad de Concepción

=== Primera B ===
- Coquimbo Unido
- Deportes Antofagasta
- Deportes Concepción
- Deportes Copiapó
- Deportes Melipilla
- Deportes Puerto Montt
- Lota Schwager
- Naval
- Provincial Osorno
- San Marcos de Arica
- Santiago Wanderers
- San Luis
- Unión La Calera
- Unión San Felipe

=== Tercera División ===
- Provincial AGC
- Deportivo Lo Barnechea
- Deportes Colchagua
- Deportes Ovalle
- Deportes Temuco
- Deportes Valdivia
- Fernández Vial
- Iberia
- Linares Unido
- Magallanes
- Municipal Mejillones
- Corporación Peñalolén
- San Antonio Unido
- Trasandino
- Unión Quilpué
- Unión Temuco

=== Cuarta División ===
- Academia Quilpué
- Academia Samuel Reyes
- Corporación Ñuñoa
- Deportes Cerro Navia
- Deportes Quilicura
- Deportes Santa Cruz
- Enfoque de Rancagua
- Ferroviarios
- General Velásquez
- Juventud Padre Hurtado
- Juventud Puente Alto
- Lautaro de Buin
- Municipal La Pintana
- Provincial Talagante
- Pudahuel Barrancas
- Universidad Iberoamericana

=== Regional teams ===
- Antofagasta - Asotel (Antofagasta)
- Araucanía - Luchador (Lican Ray)
- Arica & Parinacota - Trasandino de Socoroma (Arica)
- Atacama - Juventus (Caldera)
- Aysén - Lord Cochrane (Aysén)
- Biobío - Lord Cochrane (Concepción)
- Coquimbo - David Arellano (Coquimbo)
- Los Lagos - Deportivo Lintz
- Los Ríos - Audax de Futrono
- Magallanes - Prat de Punta Arenas
- Maule - Favorita (Lontué)
- O'Higgins - Juan Lyon (Pichidegua)
- Santiago Metropolitan - Manuel Rodríguez (Puente Alto)
- Tarapacá - Yungay (Iquique)
- Valparaíso - Balmaceda (San Antonio)

=== Special invitee ===
- Selección Rapa Nui

== First round ==
This round comprised the 2009 Tercera B teams (except one), one Regional Amateur Champion, plus five of the winners of the preliminary round.

Team 1	Agg.	Team 2	1st leg	2nd leg
Trasandino de Socoroma (Arica)	4–4 (a)	Asotel (Antofagasta)	3–0	1–4
Juan Lyon (Pichidegua)	2–3	Balmaceda (San Antonio)	1–2	1–1
Luchador (Lican Ray)	6–2	Audax de Futrono	1–1	5–1
Academia Quilpué	0–6	Deportes Quilicura	0–2	0–4
Pudahuel Barrancas	3–3 (4–3 p)	Deportes Cerro Navia	3–0	0–3
Provincial Talagante	9–2	Juventud Padre Hurtado	3–0	6–2
Ferroviarios	2–5	Universidad Iberoamericana	2–4	0–1
Real León	0–4	Corporación Ñuñoa	0–2	0–2
Municipal La Pintana	9–2	Lautaro de Buin	6–2	3–0
Academia Samuel Reyes	3–2	General Velásquez	2–0	1–2
Enfoque de Rancagua	1–6	Deportes Santa Cruz	1–3	0–3

== Second round ==
This round comprised the winners of the first round (except one), the remaining 2009 Tercera B team, and one Regional Amateur Champion team.

Team 1	Agg.	Team 2	1st leg	2nd leg
Trasandino de Socoroma (Arica)	2–3	Balmaceda (San Antonio)	1–0	1–3
Academia Samuel Reyes	1–4	Lord Cochrane (Concepción)	1–2	0–2
Municipal La Pintana	7–5	Universidad Iberoamericana	4–2	3–3
Deportes Quilicura	3–2	Juventud Puente Alto	3–1	0–1
Corporación Ñuñoa	1–2	Deportes Santa Cruz	1–1	0–1
Deportes Cerro Navia	1–6	Provincial Talagante	0–1	1–5

== Third round ==
This round comprised the winners of the second round (except two), the remaining winner of the first round, the 2009 Tercera División teams, plus two Regional Amateur Champion teams.

Team 1	Agg.	Team 2	1st leg	2nd leg
San Antonio Unido	3–7	Deportes Colchagua	1–1	2–6
Municipal Mejillones	2–3	Deportes Ovalle	1–1	1–2
Trasandino	2–4	Corporación Peñalolén	2–4	0–0
Municipal La Pintana	2–2 (a)	Deportes Quilicura	0–0	2–2
Deportes Santa Cruz	1–2	Provincial Talagante	0–1	1–1
Deportivo Lo Barnechea	4–2	Unión Quilpué	2–1	2–1
Magallanes	7–2	Provincial AGC	3–0	4–2
Deportes Temuco	5–4	Iberia	2–1	3–3
Linares Unido	2–2 (a)	Fernández Vial	2–1	0–1
Unión Temuco	5–0	Deportes Valdivia	3–0	2–0
Prat de Punta Arenas	4–3	Lord Cochrane (Aysén)	1–0	3–3

== Fourth round ==
The Fourth Round marks the beginning of the competition for professional teams. The draw for the Fourth Round was held on July 31, 2009 and was conducted by the "Manager of National Tournaments", René Rosas. This round comprised the winners of the Third Round, the 2009 Primera B teams, Primera División team Colo-Colo, and special invitee Selección Rapa Nui (the Easter Island Team).

Date	Home team	Score	Away team
August 5	Unión Temuco	4–1	Naval
August 5	Selección Rapa Nui	0–4	Colo-Colo
August 5	Deportes Temuco	3–1	Deportes Concepción
August 12	Deportivo Lo Barnechea	2–2 (2–3 p)	Deportes Melipilla
August 12	Deportes Ovalle	0–0 (2–3 p)	Coquimbo Unido
August 12	Equipo Peñalolén	2–3	Unión San Felipe
August 12	Magallanes	1–1 (3–5 p)	Santiago Wanderers
August 13	Balmaceda (San Antonio)	0–0 (1–3 p)	Deportes Copiapó
August 13	Fernández Vial	1–2	Lota Schwager
August 12/19	Deportes Colchagua	1–1 (4–5 p)	Unión La Calera
August 19	Provincial Talagante	1–1 (3–4 p)	Deportes Antofagasta
August 19	Lord Cochrane (Concepción)	0–0 (3–5 p)	San Luis
August 19	Municipal La Pintana	1–2	San Marcos de Arica
August 19	Luchador (Lican Ray)	1–2	Deportes Puerto Montt
August 19	Prat de Punta Arenas	1–2	Provincial Osorno

== Fifth round ==
Date	Home team	Score	Away team
August 26	Unión San Felipe	2–1	O'Higgins
August 26	Deportes Antofagasta	2–1	Cobreloa
August 26	San Marcos de Arica	2–2 (5–6 p)	Municipal Iquique
August 26	San Luis	2–2 (5–3 p)	Universidad de Chile
September 2	Palestino	0–1	Curicó Unido
September 2	Lota Schwager	2–1	Huachipato
September 2	Deportes Copiapó	0–4	Cobresal
September 2	Coquimbo Unido	1–1 (4–3 p)	Deportes La Serena
September 2	Unión La Calera	2–5	Unión Española
September 2	Audax Italiano	2–3	Santiago Morning
September 2	Deportes Melipilla	2–0	Rangers
September 2	Unión Temuco	2–0	Universidad Católica
September 15	Deportes Puerto Montt	0–3	Universidad de Concepción
September 16	Santiago Wanderers	0–0 (5–4 p)	Everton
September 16	Provincial Osorno	2–1	Ñublense
September 16	Deportes Temuco	0–4	Colo-Colo

== Final phase ==
=== Round of 16 ===
Date	Home team	Score	Away team
September 30	Santiago Wanderers	0–0 (3–5 p)	Santiago Morning
September 30	San Luis	1–1 (4–5 p)	Universidad de Concepción
October 6	Coquimbo Unido	1–0	Cobresal
October 7	Deportes Melipilla	2–4	Curicó Unido
October 7	Unión Temuco	2–2 (5–4 p)	Provincial Osorno
October 7	Deportes Antofagasta	0–1	Municipal Iquique
October 7	Lota Schwager	0–1	Colo-Colo
October 13	Unión San Felipe	1–0	Unión Española

=== Quarterfinals ===
Date	Home team	Score	Away team
October 21	Unión San Felipe	1–1 (6–5 p)	Colo-Colo
October 28	Unión Temuco	0–0 (5–6 p)	Universidad de Concepción
October 28	Curicó Unido	1–3	Santiago Morning
November 3	Coquimbo Unido	0–1	Municipal Iquique

=== Semifinals ===
November 11, 2009

Unión San Felipe	2 – 0	Universidad de Concepción
Carvajal 41'; Domínguez 88'

Estadio Municipal de San Felipe, San Felipe
Attendance: 3,000
Referee: Eduardo Gamboa

November 11, 2009

Municipal Iquique	1 – 1	Santiago Morning
Fica 67'		Ríos 31'
Penalties
Campozano (penalty scored); Sagredo (penalty scored); Naranjo (penalty scored); Pérez (penalty scored)	4 – 2	(penalty missed) Basaure; (penalty scored) Ríos; (penalty scored) Navia; (penalty missed) F. Díaz

Estadio Tierra de Campeones, Iquique
Attendance: 5,000
Referee: Eduardo Ponce

=== Final ===
November 15, 2009

Unión San Felipe	3 – 0	Municipal Iquique
Vildozo 20' (pen.), 45'; Briceño 90+2'

Estadio Regional Chiledeportes, Valparaíso
Attendance: 5,000
Referee: Carlos Chandía

Copa Chile
2009 Champion
U. San Felipe
First Title

== Top goalscorers ==
Pos	Name	Club	Goals
1	(Argentina) Angel Vildozo	Unión San Felipe	5
2	(Paraguay) Cristian Bogado	Colo-Colo	4
3	(Chile) Humberto Álvarez	Unión Temuco	3
3	(Argentina) Gustavo Canales	Unión Española	3
3	(Chile) Víctor Césped	Unión Temuco	3
3	(Argentina) Diego Rivarola	Santiago Morning	3

== See also ==
- Primera División 2009
- Primera B
- Tercera División
- Tercera División B
