= Torneo Clausura 2006 (Paraguay) =

Primera División
- Season: 2006 Clausura

The Torneo Clausura 2006 was the football (soccer) tournament that closed the season in the Paraguayan first division in the year 2006.

The tournament began on July 14 and ended on December 3 with the participation of 11 teams, with a two-legged all play all system. The winner was Cerro Porteño, which gained the right to play the Copa Libertadores 2007 and the national championship final against Libertad (winners of the 2006 Apertura).

== Final positions ==
Pos	Team	Pld	W	D	L	GF	GA	GD	Pts	Qualification or relegation
1	Cerro Porteño	20	16	4	0	35	10	+25	52	2007 Copa Libertadores Second Stage
2	Libertad	20	12	5	3	35	20	+15	41	
3	2 de Mayo	20	9	6	5	27	21	+6	33	
4	Tacuary	20	8	8	4	25	19	+6	32	
5	Nacional	20	8	5	7	29	21	+8	29	
6	Olimpia	20	5	8	7	22	22	0	23	
7	Sportivo Luqueño	20	5	8	7	20	30	−10	23	
8	Guaraní	20	4	9	7	21	26	−5	21	
9	3 de Febrero	20	4	5	11	17	26	−9	17	
10	12 de Octubre	20	3	5	12	21	35	−14	14	
11	Fernando de la Mora	20	3	3	14	14	36	−22	12	

== Results ==
Matchday 1
Home team	Result	Away team
Tacuary	1 - 1	12 de Octubre
Sportivo Luqueño	0 - 0	2 de Mayo
Guaraní	1 - 0	3 de Febrero
Nacional	0 - 1	Cerro Porteño
Libertad	0 - 0	Olimpia

Matchday 2
Home team	Result	Away team
12 de Octubre	1 - 4	Nacional
2 de Mayo	2 - 2	Tacuary
Cerro Porteño	3 - 1	Fernando de la Mora
3 de Febrero	0 - 1	Libertad
Olimpia	4 - 2	Sportivo Luqueño

Matchday 3
Home team	Result	Away team
Fernando de la Mora	0 - 1	12 de Octubre
Nacional	0 - 3	2 de Mayo
Libertad	1 - 1	Guaraní
Sportivo Luqueño	0 - 0	3 de Febrero
Tacuary	2 - 2	Olimpia

Matchday 4
Home team	Result	Away team
2 de Mayo	0 - 1	Fernando de la Mora
Guaraní	1 - 1	Sportivo Luqueño
3 de Febrero	0 - 2	Tacuary
12 de Octubre	0 - 1	Cerro Porteño
Olimpia	1 - 0	Nacional

Matchday 5
Home team	Result	Away team
Tacuary	1 - 0	Guaraní
Sportivo Luqueño	2 - 3	Libertad
Nacional	0 - 1	3 de Febrero
Cerro Porteño	3 - 1	2 de Mayo
Fernando de la Mora	0 - 1	Olimpia

Matchday 6
Home team	Result	Away team
Guaraní	2 - 2	Nacional
Libertad	2 - 0	Tacuary
3 de Febrero	1 - 2	Fernando de la Mora
2 de Mayo	3 - 2	12 de Octubre
Olimpia	1 - 1	Cerro Porteño

Matchday 7
Home team	Result	Away team
Cerro Porteño	1 - 0	3 de Febrero
Nacional	2 - 1	Libertad
Tacuary	1 - 0	Sportivo Luqueño
12 de Octubre	2 - 3	Olimpia
Fernando de la Mora	0 - 2	Guaraní

Matchday 8
Home team	Result	Away team
Libertad	2 - 1	Fernando de la Mora
Olimpia	1 - 1	2 de Mayo
Sportivo Luqueño	0 - 4	Nacional
Guaraní	0 - 1	Cerro Porteño
3 de Febrero	1 - 0	12 de Octubre

Matchday 9
Home team	Result	Away team
12 de Octubre	0 - 0	Guaraní
2 de Mayo	1 - 0	3 de Febrero
Fernando de la Mora	0 - 0	Sportivo Luqueño
Nacional	3 - 3	Tacuary
Cerro Porteño	1 - 0	Libertad

Matchday 10
Home team	Result	Away team
Tacuary	1 - 2	Fernando de la Mora
Sportivo Luqueño	0 - 0	Cerro Porteño
Libertad	4 - 0	12 de Octubre
Guaraní	2 - 0	2 de Mayo
3 de Febrero	1 - 0	Olimpia

Matchday 11
Home team	Result	Away team
12 de Octubre	2 - 3	Sportivo Luqueño
2 de Mayo	2 - 2	Libertad
Cerro Porteño	1 - 1	Tacuary
Fernando de la Mora	1 - 2	Nacional
Olimpia	1 - 1	Guaraní

Matchday 12
Home team	Result	Away team
2 de Mayo	1 - 2	Sportivo Luqueño
12 de Octubre	0 - 1	Tacuary
Olimpia	0 - 1	Libertad
3 de Febrero	3 - 3	Guaraní
Cerro Porteño	1 - 0	Nacional

Matchday 13
Home team	Result	Away team
Nacional	1 - 1	12 de Octubre
Libertad	2 - 1	3 de Febrero
Tacuary	0 - 1	2 de Mayo
Fernando de la Mora	1 - 3	Cerro Porteño
Sportivo Luqueño	1 - 1	Olimpia

Matchday 14
Home team	Result	Away team
12 de Octubre	2 - 2	Fernando de la Mora
2 de Mayo	0 - 0	Nacional
3 de Febrero	4 - 2	Sportivo Luqueño
Olimpia	0 - 2	Tacuary
Guaraní	1 - 2	Libertad

Matchday 15
Home team	Result	Away team
Sportivo Luqueño	3 - 1	Guaraní
Fernando de la Mora	0 - 2	2 de Mayo
Tacuary	1 - 0	3 de Febrero
Nacional	1 - 0	Olimpia
Cerro Porteño	1 - 0	12 de Octubre

Matchday 16
Home team	Result	Away team
Libertad	4 - 0	Sportivo Luqueño
Guaraní	1 - 1	Tacuary
2 de Mayo	0 - 1	Cerro Porteño
3 de Febrero	0 - 3	Nacional
Olimpia	5 - 1	Fernando de la Mora

Matchday 17
Home team	Result	Away team
Fernando de la Mora	0 - 0	3 de Febrero
12 de Octubre	1 - 3	2 de Mayo
Nacional	2 - 0	Guaraní
Tacuary	1 - 1	Libertad
Cerro Porteño	1 - 0	Olimpia

Matchday 18
Home team	Result	Away team
Libertad	2 - 1	Nacional
Sportivo Luqueño	0 - 0	Tacuary
3 de Febrero	1 - 1	Cerro Porteño
Olimpia	0 - 2	12 de Octubre
Guaraní	3 - 1	Fernando de la Mora

Matchday 19
Home team	Result	Away team
Fernando de la Mora	0 - 2	Libertad
2 de Mayo	2 - 1	Olimpia
Nacional	0 - 0	Sportivo Luqueño
Cerro Porteño	5 - 1	Guaraní
12 de Octubre	3 - 2	3 de Febrero

Matchday 20
Home team	Result	Away team
Sportivo Luqueño	1 - 0	Fernando de la Mora
3 de Febrero	1 - 2	2 de Mayo
Guaraní	1 - 1	12 de Octubre
Libertad	1 - 4	Cerro Porteño
Tacuary	2 - 1	Nacional

Matchday 21
Home team	Result	Away team
2 de Mayo	1 - 0	Guaraní
Fernando de la Mora	0 - 2	Tacuary
Olimpia	1 - 1	3 de Febrero
12 de Octubre	1 - 2	Libertad
Cerro Porteño	3 - 1	Sportivo Luqueño

Matchday 22
Home team	Result	Away team
Libertad	2 - 2	2 de Mayo
Tacuary	1 - 2	Cerro Porteño
Guaraní	0 - 0	Olimpia
Sportivo Luqueño	2 - 1	12 de Octubre
Nacional	3 - 1	Fernando de la Mora

== Top scorers ==
Player		Goals	Team
Paraguay	Juan Eduardo Samudio	9	Libertad
Paraguay	Édison Giménez	8	2 de Mayo
Paraguay	Gilberto Palacios	8	Tacuary
Paraguay	Erwin Ávalos	7	Cerro Porteño

== See also ==
- 2006 in Paraguayan football
