= 2010 Copa Chile Bicentenario =

2010 Copa Chile
Tournament details
- Country: Chile
- Teams: 76

Final positions
- Champions: Municipal Iquique
- Runners-up: Deportes Concepción

Tournament statistics
- Top goal scorer: Matías Jara (9 goals)

The 2010 Copa Chile Bicentenario was the 31st edition of the competition. The competition started on March 27, 2010 with the preliminary rounds and concludes on December 8, 2010 with the Final. The winner qualifies for the 2011 Copa Sudamericana.

== Schedule ==
Round	Date
Preliminary Rounds	March 27, 2010; April 18, 2010
First round	May 13, 2010; May 23, 2010
Second Round	May 27, 2010; June 6, 2010
Third Round	September 4, 2010; September 8, 2010
Quarterfinals	October 7, 2010; October 11, 2010
Semifinals	October 27, 2010
Final	December 8, 2010

== First round ==
The first leg was played between May 13 and 19 May 2010, with the second legs played between May 20 and 23. The team with the most points after the two legs advanced to the next round. If both teams were equal on points, a penalty shootout took place (goal difference and away goals did not count).

Teams			Scores		Tie-breakers
Team #1	Points	Team #2	1st leg	2nd leg	Penalties
Selección San Pedro de Atacama	0:6	Universidad Católica	0–4	0–10	—
Curicó Unido	3:3	Colo-Colo	4–2	0–5	4–3
General Velásquez (Puchuncaví)	3:3	Municipal La Pintana	3–1	0–1	5–4
Deportes Colchagua	0:6	O'Higgins	0–2	2–3	—
Deportes Temuco	4:1	Unión Temuco	2–0	2–2	—
Deportes Tocopilla	0:6	Municipal Iquique	2–4	1–6	—
Municipal Mejillones	0:6	Deportes Antofagasta	0–1	0–2	—
San Antonio Unido	0:6	Palestino	1–2	0–6	—
Municipal Hijuelas	0:6	Unión La Calera	0–2	0–4	—
Provincial Talagante	0:6	Santiago Morning	1–3	3–5	
Selección Vallenar	0:6	Deportes La Serena	0–12	0–7	—
Municipal Pozo Almonte	1:4	San Marcos de Arica	1–2	3–3	—
Lota Schwager	3.3	Universidad de Chile	1–2	4–2	4–3
Prat de Punta Arenas	0:6	Deportes Puerto Montt	0–5	0–5	—
Deportivo Lo Barnechea	3:3	Santiago Wanderers	2–1	1–2	7–8
Rengo Unido	0:6	Cobreloa	1–8	1–4	—
Juventud Varsovia (Lo Espejo)	0:6	Audax Italiano	0–5	0–13	—
Deportes Quilicura	0:6	Unión Española	0–4	0–4	—
Lord Cochrane (Aysén)	0:6	Provincial Osorno	0–6	0–8	—
Magallanes	0:6	San Luis	0–1	1–3	—
Deportes Paniahue (Santa Cruz)	0:6	Rangers	0–2	0–7	—
Luchador Coñaripe (Licanray)	0:6	Huachipato	1–6	1–12	—
Fernández Vial	0:6	Deportes Concepción	0–3	2–4	—
Lord Cochrane (Concepción)	0:6	Naval	1–2	1–2	—
Óscar Bonilla (Linares)	0:6	Linares Unido	0–1	0–2	—
Deportes Ovalle	0:6	Coquimbo Unido	1–6	1–4	—
Trasandino	1:4	Unión San Felipe	1–3	1–1	—
Deportes Copiapó	0:6	Cobresal	1–3	1–2	—
Iberia	0:6	Universidad de Concepción	0–3	1–4	—
Deportes Melipilla	1:4	Everton	1–1	1–5	—
Unión Wanderers (Valdivia)	0:6	Ñublense	0–4	0–5	—
Sportverein Jugendland	2:2	Pudahuel Barrancas	1–1	2–2	1–4

== Second round ==
The first leg was played between May 27 and June 1, with the second legs played between June 2 and 6. The team with the most points after the two legs advanced to the next round. If both teams were equal on points, a penalty shootout took place (goal difference and away goals did not count).

Teams			Scores		Tie-breakers
Team #1	Points	Team #2	1st leg	2nd leg	Penalties
San Marcos de Arica	3:3	Municipal Iquique	5–4	0–1	2–4
Deportes Antofagasta	1:4	Cobreloa	0–0	0–1	—
Coquimbo Unido	3:3	Deportes La Serena	2–1	0–1	8–7
Unión La Calera	4:1	Everton	1–1	3–1	—
General Velásquez (Puchuncaví)	0:6	San Luis	1–2	1–4	—
Unión San Felipe	3:3	Santiago Wanderers	2–1	0–3	5–6
Santiago Morning	1:4	Palestino	2–6	2–2	—
Audax Italiano	6:0	Cobresal	2–1	3–1	—
Pudahuel Barrancas	0:6	Unión Española	5–8	1–6	—
Deportes Temuco	0:6	Universidad Católica	0–5	3–5	—
Rangers	2:2	Curicó Unido	1–1	0–0	2–4
Linares Unido	3:3	O'Higgins	1–0	0–3	4–3
Deportes Concepción	6:0	Universidad de Concepción	1–0	2–1	—
Lota Schwager	1:4	Huachipato	1–2	2–2	—
Naval	0:6	Ñublense	0–2	0–2	—
Deportes Puerto Montt	4:1	Provincial Osorno	0–0	7–3	—

== Third round ==
Played one-legged

Date	Home team	Score	Away team
September 1	Coquimbo Unido	0–3	Unión Española
September 4	Palestino	3–0	San Luis
September 4	Linares Unido	0–4	Ñublense
September 5	Deportes Puerto Montt	4–2	Universidad Católica
September 5	Unión La Calera	1–0	Santiago Wanderers
September 8	Curicó Unido	1–0	Audax Italiano
September 8	Deportes Concepción	1–1 (4–1p)	Huachipato
September 8	Municipal Iquique	2–1	Cobreloa

== Quarterfinals ==
Played one-legged

Date	Home team	Score	Away team
October 7	Curicó Unido	0–2	Palestino
October 7	Deportes Concepción	3–1	Unión La Calera
October 7	Municipal Iquique	2–0	Ñublense
October 11	Deportes Puerto Montt	2–1	Unión Española

== Semifinals ==
October 27, 2010

Deportes Puerto Montt	2 – 3	Municipal Iquique
Peralta 56'; Parada 86'		Contreras 26'; Martel 30'; Carilao 80'

Estadio Regional de Chinquihue, Puerto Montt
Attendance: 4,800
Referee: Enrique Osses

October 27, 2010

Deportes Concepción	0 – 0	Palestino
Penalties
Ricard (penalty scored); Almendra (penalty scored); Nasa (penalty scored); Salazar (penalty scored)	4 – 2	(penalty scored) Henríquez; (penalty missed) Moya; (penalty scored) Carrasco; (penalty missed) Riquelme

Estadio Municipal de Concepción, Concepción
Attendance: 3,610
Referee: Jorge Osorio

== Final ==
December 8, 2010

Municipal Iquique	1 – 1	Deportes Concepción
Ramos 36'	Report	Ricard 33'
Penalties
Ayala (penalty scored); Mas (penalty scored); Millape (penalty scored); Núñez (penalty scored); Martel (penalty missed)	4 – 3	(penalty scored) Ricard; (penalty missed) Almendra; (penalty scored) Nasa; (penalty scored) Figueroa; (penalty missed) Salazar

Estadio Francisco Sanchez Rumoroso, Coquimbo
Attendance: 2,124
Referee: Jorge Osorio

Copa Chile
2010 Champion

Iquique
Second Title

== Top goalscorers ==
Pos	Name	Club	Goals
1	(Argentina) Matías Jara	Huachipato	9
2	(Argentina) Pablo Vranjicán	Universidad Católica	8
3	(Chile) Leonardo Monje	Unión Española	7
3	(Chile) Cristián Canío	Audax Italiano	7

== See also ==
- 2010 Primera División season
- Primera División B
- Tercera División A
- Tercera División B
