= Abarca (surname) =

Abarca is a Spanish surname. Notable people with the surname include:

- Adelaida Abarca Izquierdo (1923–?), Spanish Republican political activist
- Agustín Abarca (1882–1953), Chilean painter
- Alisson Abarca (born 1996), Salvadoran model
- Anabel Abarca, American politician from Chicago, Illinois, U.S.
- Apolonia Muñoz Abarca (1920–2009), American health professional
- Carlos Abarca (1900–1944), Chilean Olympic boxer
- Claudio Abarca (born 1994), Chilean footballer
- Cristián Abarca (born 1989), Chilean footballer
- Damaris Abarca (born 1990), Chilean lawyer
- Diego Abarca (born 2005), American footballer
- Ildefonso Vargas y Abarca (1633–1697), Roman Catholic prelate who served as Bishop of Comayagua
- Joaquín Abarca (1780–1844), Spanish prelate
- Josep María Abarca (born 1974), Spanish water polo player
- Josué Abarca (born 2000), Costa Rican footballer
- Juan Abarca (born 1988), Chilean footballer
- Luis Abarca (born 1965), Chilean footballer
- Luis Flores Abarca (born 1982), Chilean footballer
- Maria de Abarca (died 1656), Spanish painter
- Mariano Abarca (1958–2009), Mexican community activist
- Mariano Ricafort Palacín y Abarca (1776–1846), Governor of Cuba from 1832 to 1834
- Obdulia Torres Abarca (born 1961), Mexican Democratic Revolution party politician
- Pedro Abarca (1619–1693), Spanish Jesuit theologian
- Pedro Pablo Abarca de Bolea, Count of Aranda (1718–1798), Spanish statesman and diplomat
- Ricardo Abarca (born 1986), Mexican actor and singer
- Salvatore Abarca (born 1986), Chilean footballer
- Ximena Abarca (born 1981), Chilean pop singer

== See also ==
- Abarca (disambiguation)
