= Torneo Apertura 2006 (Paraguay) =

Primera División
- Season: 2006 Apertura

The Torneo Apertura 2006 was the football (soccer) tournament that opened the season in the Paraguayan first division in the year 2006.

The tournament began on January 27 and ended on June 3 with the participation of 11 teams, with a two-legged all play all system. The winner was Libertad, which gained the right to play the Copa Libertadores 2007 and the national championship final against Cerro Porteño (winners of the Clausura 2006).

== Final positions ==
Pos	Team	Pld	W	D	L	GF	GA	GD	Pts	Qualification or relegation
1	Libertad	20	13	3	4	42	20	+22	42	2007 Copa Libertadores Second Stage
2	Cerro Porteño	20	12	4	4	36	22	+14	40	
3	Tacuary	20	10	4	6	34	33	+1	34	
4	Sportivo Luqueño	20	9	6	5	39	29	+10	33	
5	12 de Octubre	20	8	4	8	25	31	−6	28	
6	Olimpia	20	8	3	9	34	30	+4	27	
7	2 de Mayo	20	6	7	7	29	33	−4	25	
8	Nacional	20	6	6	8	42	36	+6	24	
9	Guaraní	20	5	6	9	34	43	−9	21	
10	3 de Febrero	20	5	4	11	29	41	−12	19	
11	Fernando de la Mora	20	3	3	14	21	47	−26	12	

== Results ==
Matchday 1
Home team	Result	Away team
2 de Mayo	0 - 0	Fernando de la Mora
Nacional	1 - 1	Cerro Porteño
3 de Febrero	0 - 3	Libertad
Sportivo Luqueño	1 - 1	Tacuary
12 de Octubre	1 - 0	Olimpia

Matchday 2
Home team	Result	Away team
Olimpia	2 - 0	2 de Mayo
Libertad	3 - 1	Nacional
Tacuary	3 - 2	3 de Febrero
Cerro Porteño	3 - 0	12 de Octubre
Fernando de la Mora	1 - 2	Guaraní

Matchday 3
Home team	Result	Away team
2 de Mayo	2 - 3	Cerro Porteño
12 de Octubre	1 - 0	Libertad
Nacional	2 - 0	Tacuary
3 de Febrero	2 - 0	Sportivo Luqueño
Guaraní	1 - 1	Olimpia

Matchday 4
Home team	Result	Away team
Sportivo Luqueño	2 - 1	Nacional
Tacuary	0 - 0	12 de Octubre
Olimpia	2 - 2	Fernando de la Mora
Libertad	0 - 1	2 de Mayo
Cerro Porteño	1 - 1	Guaraní

Matchday 5
Home team	Result	Away team
2 de Mayo	3 - 3	Tacuary
12 de Octubre	1 - 1	Sportivo Luqueño
Guaraní	2 - 4	Libertad
Nacional	5 - 2	3 de Febrero
Fernando de la Mora	0 - 1	Cerro Porteño

Matchday 6
Home team	Result	Away team
Tacuary	2 - 1	Guaraní
3 de Febrero	2 - 0	12 de Octubre
Sportivo Luqueño	6 - 1	2 de Mayo
Libertad	5 - 1	Fernando de la Mora
Cerro Porteño	1 - 0	Olimpia

Matchday 7
Home team	Result	Away team
Olimpia	1 - 2	Libertad
Fernando de la Mora	0 - 1	Tacuary
Guaraní	0 - 1	Sportivo Luqueño
2 de Mayo	1 - 0	3 de Febrero
12 de Octubre	4 - 2	Nacional

Matchday 8
Home team	Result	Away team
Nacional	5 - 6	2 de Mayo
3 de Febrero	2 - 2	Guaraní
Libertad	0 - 2	Cerro Porteño
Sportivo Luqueño	2 - 3	Fernando de la Mora
Tacuary	2 - 3	Olimpia

Matchday 9
Home team	Result	Away team
Guaraní	1 - 5	Nacional
2 de Mayo	1 - 0	12 de Octubre
Cerro Porteño	1 - 3	Tacuary
Olimpia	1 - 2	Sportivo Luqueño
Fernando de la Mora	1 - 2	3 de Febrero

Matchday 10
Home team	Result	Away team
12 de Octubre	1 - 1	Guaraní
Nacional	3 - 0	Fernando de la Mora
3 de Febrero	1 - 3	Olimpia
Tacuary	2 - 1	Libertad
Sportivo Luqueño	2 - 2	Cerro Porteño

Matchday 11
Home team	Result	Away team
Cerro Porteño	4 - 1	3 de Febrero
Olimpia	3 - 1	Nacional
Fernando de la Mora	0 - 2	12 de Octubre
Guaraní	2 - 1	2 de Mayo
Libertad	1 - 1	Sportivo Luqueño

Matchday 12
Home team	Result	Away team
Libertad	1 - 0	3 de Febrero
Olimpia	1 - 0	12 de Octubre
Tacuary	2 - 2	Sportivo Luqueño
Cerro Porteño	4 - 3	Nacional
Fernando de la Mora	2 - 1	2 de Mayo

Matchday 13
Home team	Result	Away team
2 de Mayo	3 - 0	Olimpia
3 de Febrero	3 - 4	Tacuary
Guaraní	5 - 1	Fernando de la Mora
Nacional	2 - 2	Libertad
12 de Octubre	2 - 1	Cerro Porteño

Matchday 14
Home team	Result	Away team
Tacuary	1 - 0	Nacional
Olimpia	3 - 2	Guaraní
Sportivo Luqueño	2 - 0	3 de Febrero
Cerro Porteño	1 - 1	2 de Mayo
Libertad	5 - 1	12 de Octubre

Matchday 15
Home team	Result	Away team
Nacional	5 - 1	Sportivo Luqueño
Guaraní	1 - 4	Cerro Porteño
12 de Octubre	2 - 1	Tacuary
Fernando de la Mora	1 - 3	Olimpia
2 de Mayo	0 - 0	Libertad

Matchday 16
Home team	Result	Away team
Sportivo Luqueño	5 - 0	12 de Octubre
Tacuary	3 - 1	2 de Mayo
3 de Febrero	1 - 0	Nacional
Libertad	3 - 2	Guaraní
Cerro Porteño	2 - 1	Fernando de la Mora

Matchday 17
Home team	Result	Away team
Sportivo Luqueño	2 - 2	2 de Mayo
Guaraní	3 - 2	Tacuary
Cerro Porteño	1 - 0	Olimpia
12 de Octubre	1 - 1	3 de Febrero
Libertad	2 - 0	Fernando de la Mora

Matchday 18
Home team	Result	Away team
Sportivo Luqueño	2 - 1	Guaraní
Tacuary	1 - 0	Fernando de la Mora
Nacional	1 - 0	12 de Octubre
3 de Febrero	2 - 2	2 de Mayo
Libertad	3 - 1	Olimpia

Matchday 19
Home team	Result	Away team
Guaraní	1 - 1	3 de Febrero
Cerro Porteño	0 - 2	Libertad
Fernando de la Mora	0 - 0	Sportivo Luqueño
Olimpia	6 - 1	Tacuary
2 de Mayo	0 - 0	Nacional

Matchday 20
Home team	Result	Away team
Tacuary	1 - 0	Cerro Porteño
3 de Febrero	3 - 4	Fernando de la Mora
12 de Octubre	2 - 0	2 de Mayo
Nacional	2 - 2	Guaraní
Sportivo Luqueño	2 - 1	Olimpia

Matchday 21
Home team	Result	Away team
Olimpia	2 - 3	3 de Febrero
Cerro Porteño	2 - 0	Sportivo Luqueño
Guaraní	4 - 3	12 de Octubre
Libertad	2 - 1	Tacuary
Fernando de la Mora	2 - 2	Nacional

Matchday 22
Home team	Result	Away team
Nacional	1 - 1	Olimpia
12 de Octubre	4 - 2	Fernando de la Mora
2 de Mayo	3 - 0	Guaraní
3 de Febrero	1 - 2	Cerro Porteño
Sportivo Luqueño	1 - 3	Libertad

== Top scorers ==
Jugador		Goles	Equipo
Uruguay	Rodrigo López	19	Libertad
Paraguay	Óscar Cardozo	15	Nacional
Paraguay	Javier González	12	Sportivo Luqueño
Uruguay	Martín García	11	Olimpia

== See also ==
- 2006 in Paraguayan football
