= Salvatore Abarca =

Chilean footballer

Personal information
- Full name: Salvatore Octavio Abarca Reyes
- Date of birth: 13 May 1986 (age 40)
- Place of birth: Santiago, Chile
- Height: 1.81 m (5 ft 11 in)
- Position: Forward

Youth career
- 1998–2001: Cobresal
- 2001–2003: Magallanes

Senior career*
Years	Team	Apps	(Gls)
2003–2008	Magallanes		
2004	→ Hosanna (loan)		
2006	→ Provincial Talagante (loan)		
2008–2009	Deportes Ovalle		
2009–2010	Ängelholms FF		
2011	Triomphe Liancourt		
2011	Belgrano de Arequito		
2012	Provincial Talagante		(17)
2013	Barnechea	11	(1)
2013–2014	San Antonio Unido	15	(6)
2014–2015	Deportes Valdivia	18	(5)
2016–2017	Trasandino		
- * Club domestic league appearances and goals

Salvatore Octavio Abarca Reyes (born 13 May 1986), also known as Tore Abarca, is a Chilean former footballer who played as a forward for clubs in Chile and abroad.

== Club career ==
As a youth player, Abarca was with both Cobresal and Magallanes. He made his professional debut with Magallanes at the age of sixteen and had two stints on loan with Hosanna and Provincial Talagante in the Chilean third level.

After a stint with Deportes Ovalle, even knocking Colo-Colo out from the 2008–09 Copa Chile and reaching the final match, he moved abroad and played for Ängelholms FF in Sweden, Triomphe de Liancourt in the Ligue Haïtienne, where he came thanks to the coach José Valladares and coincided with his compatriots Joaquín Gatica and Víctor Retamal, and Belgrano de Arequito in Argentina.

Back in Chile, he joined Provincial Talagante, becoming the top goalscorer of the Tercera A de Chile with seventeen goals. After, he played for Barnechea, San Antonio Unido and Deportes Valdivia.

His last club was Trasandino in 2016–17.

== After football ==
Abarca went on playing football at amateur level in clubs such as Salesianos FC.

== Honours ==
- Tercera División A de Chile Top Goalscorer: 2012
