= 2006 Copa Sudamericana =

2006 Copa Sudamericana de Clubes
2006 Copa Nissan Sudamericana de Clubes 2006 Copa Nissan Sul-americana do Clubes

Tournament details
- Dates: 22 August – 13 December
- Teams: 34 (from 12 associations)

Final positions
- Champions: (Mexico) Pachuca (1st title)
- Runners-up: (Chile) Colo-Colo

Tournament statistics
- Matches played: 66
- Goals scored: 184 (2.79 per match)
- Top scorer: (Chile) Humberto Suazo (10 goals)

The 2006 Copa Sudamericana de Clubes, officially the 2006 Copa Nissan Sudamericana de Clubes for sponsorship reasons, was an international football championship competition that was played by 34 teams in total, including 31 CONMEBOL teams and also three invited teams from CONCACAF.

Pachuca won their first title in history after defeating Colo-Colo tying 1–1 in the first leg in Mexico, and winning 2–1 in Chile. Pachuca only lost one game in the tournament, against Colombian Deportes Tolima 2–1 in their debut.

This was the second time a Mexican club reached the final, after UNAM lost the 2005 edition to Boca Juniors. Meanwhile, this was also the first time a Chilean club arrived to a final since the tournament's inauguration in 2002.

Also, this was the first (and to date only) time a Mexican (or CONCACAF) representative won the Copa Sudamericana or any CONMEBOL-sanctioned tournament.

== Qualified teams ==
The Copa Sudamericana 2006 tournament was the sixth edition of the Copa Sudamericana tournament.

Association	Team	Qualify method
Argentina 7 Berths	Boca Juniors	Invitee and 2005 Copa Sudamericana Champions
Argentina 7 Berths	River Plate	Invitee
Argentina 7 Berths	Gimnasia y Esgrima	2005–06 Argentine Primera División 2nd place overall
Argentina 7 Berths	Banfield	2005–06 Argentine Primera División 4th place overall
Argentina 7 Berths	Velez Sarsfield	2005–06 Argentine Primera División 5th place overall
Argentina 7 Berths	Lanús	2005–06 Argentine Primera División 6th place
Argentina 7 Berths	San Lorenzo	2005–06 Argentine Primera División 7th place
Bolivia 2 Berths	Bolivar	Apertura 2005 Runners-Up
Bolivia 2 Berths	Universitario de Sucre	Clausura 2005 3rd place
Brazil 8 Berths	Corinthians	2005 Série A winner
Brazil 8 Berths	Fluminense	2005 Série A 5th place
Brazil 8 Berths	Atletico Paranaense	2005 Série A 6th place
Brazil 8 Berths	Paraná	2005 Série A 7th place
Brazil 8 Berths	Cruzeiro	2005 Série A 8th place
Brazil 8 Berths	Botafogo	2005 Série A 9th place
Brazil 8 Berths	Santos	2005 Série A 10th place
Brazil 8 Berths	Vasco da Gama	2005 Série A 12th place
Chile 2 Berths	Colo-Colo	2006 Fase Clasificatoria1st place
Chile 2 Berths	Huachipato	2006 Fase Classificatoria 2nd place
Colombia 2 Berths	Independiente Medellín	2005 Reclasificacion 4th place
Colombia 2 Berths	Deportes Tolima	2005 Reclasificacion 5th place
Costa Rica 1 Berth	Alajuelense	Invitee
Ecuador 2 Berths	LDU Quito	2005 Apertura 1st place
Ecuador 2 Berths	El Nacional	2005 Clausura 1st place
Mexico 2 Berths	Toluca	Clausura 2006 1st place
Mexico 2 Berths	Pachuca	Clausura 2006 4th most eligible place
Paraguay 2 Berths	Cerro Porteño	2005 Liga Paraguaya 1st place overall
Paraguay 2 Berths	Libertad	2005 Liga Paraguaya 4th place overall
Peru 2 Berths	Universidad de San Martín	2005 Torneo Descentralizado 4th place
Peru 2 Berths	Coronel Bolognesi	2005 Torneo Descentralizado 5th place
Uruguay 2 Berths	Nacional	2005–06 Liguilla 3rd place
Uruguay 2 Berths	Central Español	2005–06 Liguilla 4th place
Venezuela 2 Berths	Carabobo	2005–06 Primera División 4th place
Venezuela 2 Berths	Mineros de Guayana	2005–06 Primera División 5th place

== First stage ==
The table gives the teams in the first round gathered in elimination groups of 2 teams or 4 teams. Teams hosting the first game are on the left. Advancing teams are in bold.

Team 1	Agg.	Team 2	1st leg	2nd leg
Chile/Peru Preliminary
Huachipato (Chile)	3–3 (3–5p)	(Chile) **Colo-Colo**	1–2	2–1
**Coronel Bolognesi** (Peru)	3-3 (a)	(Peru) Universidad San Martín	1–0	2–3
Bolivia/Ecuador Preliminary
**Universitario de Sucre** (Bolivia)	5–4	(Bolivia) Bolívar	2–2	3–2
LDU Quito (Ecuador)	3–4 (a)	(Ecuador) **El Nacional**	2–3	1–1
Paraguay/Uruguay Preliminary
**Libertad** (Paraguay)	4–1	(Paraguay) Cerro Porteño	3–1	1–0
Central Español (Uruguay)	0–1	(Uruguay) **Nacional**	0–1	0–0
Colombia/Venezuela Preliminary
**Deportes Tolima** (Colombia)	4–2	(Colombia) Independiente Medellín	3–1	1–1
**Mineros de Guayana** (Venezuela)	6–1	(Venezuela) Carabobo	3–0	3–1

== Second stage ==
Team 1	Agg.	Team 2	1st leg	2nd leg
Universitario de Sucre (Bolivia)	2–5	(Ecuador) **El Nacional**	1–3	1–2
**Santos** (Brazil)	1–1 (4–3p)	(Brazil) Cruzeiro	1–0	0–1
**San Lorenzo** (Argentina)	2–1	(Argentina) Banfield	2–1	0–0
Botafogo (Brazil)	2–2 (2–4p)	(Brazil) **Fluminense**	1–1	1–1
Coronel Bolognesi (Peru)	2–2 (a)	(Chile) **Colo-Colo**	2–1	0–1
**Deportes Tolima** (Colombia)	2–2 (a)	(Venezuela) Mineros de Guayana	0–0	2–2
**Lanús** (Argentina)	3–0	(Argentina) Vélez Sarsfield	2–0	1–0
Vasco da Gama (Brazil)	1–4	(Brazil) **Corinthians**	0–1	1–3
Paraná (Brazil)	1–4	(Brazil) **Atlético Paranaense**	1–3	0–1
Libertad (Paraguay)	2–4	(Uruguay) **Nacional**	1–2	1–2

== Knockout stages ==
Round of 16
(Uruguay) **Nacional** (p) *	2	1	3 (3)
(Argentina) Boca Juniors	1	2	3 (1)
(Argentina) River Plate *	0	2	2
(Brazil) **Atlético Paranaense**	1	2	3
(Brazil) Corinthians *	0	2	2
(Argentina) **Lanús**	0	4	4
(Colombia) Deportes Tolima *	2	1	3
(Mexico) **Pachuca**	1	5	6
(Costa Rica) Alajuelense *	0	2	2
(Chile) **Colo-Colo**	4	7	11
(Brazil) Fluminense *	1	0	1
(Argentina) **Gimnasia y Esgrima**	1	2	3
(Argentina) **San Lorenzo** *	3	0	3
(Brazil) Santos	0	1	1
(Mexico) **Toluca** *	1	2	3
(Ecuador) El Nacional	0	0	0

Quarterfinals
(Uruguay) Nacional *	1	1	2
(Brazil) **Atlético Paranaense**	2	4	6
(Argentina) Lanús *	0	2	2
(Mexico) **Pachuca**	3	2	5
(Chile) **Colo-Colo** *	4	2	6
(Argentina) Gimnasia y Esgrima	1	0	1
(Argentina) San Lorenzo *	3	0	3
(Mexico) **Toluca** (a)	1	2	3

Semifinals
(Brazil) Atlético Paranaense *	0	1	1
(Mexico) **Pachuca**	1	4	5
(Chile) **Colo-Colo** *	2	2	4
(Mexico) Toluca	1	0	1

Final
(Mexico) **Pachuca** *	1	2	3
(Chile) Colo-Colo	1	1	2

(*)Indicates that the team plays at home for the first leg

=== Round of 16 ===
The Round of 16 was played between September 26 and October 12 of 2006. It was played by the ten winners from the first round, plus River Plate, Boca Juniors, Gimnasia y Esgrima, Alajuelense, Toluca and Pachuca. As in the first round, these teams played two-legged matches. Team #1 played at home first.

Team 1	Agg.	Team 2	1st leg	2nd leg
**Nacional** (Uruguay)	(3–1 p) 3–3	(Argentina) Boca Juniors	2–1	1–2
River Plate (Argentina)	2–3	(Brazil) **Atlético Paranaense**	0–1	2–2
Corinthians (Brazil)	2–4	(Argentina) **Lanús**	0–0	2–4
Deportes Tolima (Colombia)	3–6	(Mexico) **Pachuca**	2–1	1–5
Alajuelense (Costa Rica)	2–11	(Chile) **Colo-Colo**	0–4	2–7
Fluminense (Brazil)	1–3	(Argentina) **Gimnasia y Esgrima**	1–1	0–2
**San Lorenzo** (Argentina)	3–1	(Brazil) Santos	3–0	0–1
**Toluca** (Mexico)	3–0	(Ecuador) El Nacional	1–0	2–0

=== Quarterfinals ===
The quarterfinals was played between October 18 and November 1 of 2006. The eight winners from the Round of 16. As in the first round, these teams played two-legged matches. Team #1 played at home first.

Team 1	Agg.	Team 2	1st leg	2nd leg
Nacional (Uruguay)	2–6	(Brazil) **Atlético Paranaense**	1–2	1–4
Lanús (Argentina)	2–5	(Mexico) **Pachuca**	0–3	2–2
**Colo-Colo** (Chile)	6–1	(Argentina) Gimnasia y Esgrima	4–1	2–0
San Lorenzo (Argentina)	3–3 (a)	(Mexico) **Toluca**	3–1	0–2

=== Semifinals ===
The semifinals was played between November 15 to the 22nd of 2006. The four winners from the quarterfinals. As in the first round, these teams played two-legged matches. Team #1 played at home first.

Team 1	Agg.	Team 2	1st leg	2nd leg
Atlético Paranaense (Brazil)	1–5	(Mexico) **Pachuca**	0–1	1–4
**Colo-Colo** (Chile)	4–1	(Mexico) Toluca	2–1	2–0

=== Finals ===
The finals were played between November 30 and December 13 of 2006. As in the first round, these teams played two-legged matches to determine the champion. Team #1 played at home first.

Team 1	Agg.	Team 2	1st leg	2nd leg
**Pachuca** (Mexico)	3–2	(Chile) Colo-Colo	1–1	2–1

Copa Sudamericana
2006 champion

**First title**

== Top goalscorers ==
Pos	Name	Club	Goals
1	(Chile) Humberto Suazo	(Chile) Colo-Colo	10
2	(Chile) Matías Fernández	(Chile) Colo-Colo	6
3	(Argentina) Christian Giménez	(Mexico) Pachuca	5
3	(Brazil) Marcos Aurélio	(Brazil) Atletico Paranaense	4
5	(Mexico) Juan Carlos Cacho	(Mexico) Pachuca	4
5	(Argentina) Rodrigo Archubi	(Argentina) Lanús	4
