= Fernando Solís =

Fernando Solís may refer to:

- Fernando Solís (journalist) (born 1966), Chilean journalist and presenter
- Fernando Solís (footballer) (born 1976), Chilean football manager and former player
