= 2008–09 Copa Chile =

Tournament details
- Country: Chile
- Teams: 55

Final positions
- Champions: Universidad de Concepción
- Runners-up: Deportes Ovalle

Tournament statistics
- Top goal scorer(s): Lucas Barrios, Gamadiel García, Manuel Neira (4 goals)

The 2008 Copa Chile was the 29th edition of the tournament. It began on July 6, 2008, and ended on February 17, 2009. The winner of Copa Chile 2008 is eligible to play a berth in the Copa Sudamericana 2009. In the final Universidad de Concepción defeated the third division team Deportes Ovalle 2–1, thereby claiming their first title.

== Calendar ==
Round	Date
Preliminary Round	6–27 July 2008
First Round	13 August; 18 September 2008
Second Round	25 September; 11 October 2008
Third Round	16–30 October 2008
Quarterfinals	3–5 February 2009
Semifinals	11 February 2009
Final	17 February 2009

== Preliminary round ==
Team 1	Agg.	Team 2	1st leg	2nd leg
Selección Punta Arenas	2–7	Magallanes	1–2	1–5
Deportivo Lo Barnechea	4–6	Provincial Talagante	1–3	3–3
Deportes Tocopilla	3–3 (5-4p)	Municipal Mejillones	2–1	1–2
Unión Temuco	5–2	Deportes Temuco	3–0	2–2
Naval	0–2	Deportes Valdivia	0–2	0–0
Unión Bellavista	6–10	Deportivo Ormazábal	4–4	2–6
Ferroviarios	3–3 (a)	Deportes Ovalle	3–3	0–0
Trasandino	0–3	Linares Unido	0–1	0–2
Malleco Unido	3–1	Iberia	1–1	2–0
Cabildo AGC	4–5	Unión Quilpué	1–2	3–3
Deportes Santa Cruz	4–4 (a)	Deportes Colchagua	3–0	1–4
Selección Coyhaique	6–5	Selección Puerto Aysén	4–1	2–4

== First round ==
Home team	Score	Away team
Unión Temuco	2–4	Fernández Vial
Malleco Unido	1–1 (2-4p)	Lota Schwager
Deportivo Ormazábal	2–1	San Marcos de Arica
Unión Quilpué	0–2	San Luis
Provincial Talagante	1–1 (6-5p)	Unión San Felipe*
Linares Unido	1–1 (5-6p)	Curicó Unido
Deportes Tocopilla	1–1 (7-6p)	Municipal Iquique
Deportes Ovalle	3–1	Coquimbo Unido
Deportes Santa Cruz	1–3	Unión La Calera
Deportes Valdivia	1–0	Deportes Puerto Montt
Magallanes	1–0	Deportes Copiapó
Selección Coyhaique	0–6	Santiago Wanderers

* Qualified as "Best Loser"

== Second round ==
Home team	Score	Away team
Fernández Vial	2–4	Colo-Colo
Unión La Calera	1–1 (4-3p)	Everton
Deportes Tocopilla	1–3	Cobreloa
Deportivo Ormazábal	0–1	Deportes Antofagasta
Santiago Wanderers	1–0	Universidad de Chile
Magallanes	0–2	Cobresal
Lota Schwager	0–0 (3-4p)	Universidad de Concepción
San Luis	0–2	Unión Española
Deportes Ovalle	0–0 (5-4p)	Deportes La Serena
Provincial Talagante	0–1	Deportes Melipilla
Deportes Valdivia	0–6	Provincial Osorno
Unión San Felipe	2–2 (4-5p)	Rangers
Curicó Unido	1–2	O'Higgins
Audax Italiano	3–0	Universidad Católica
Palestino	0–1	Santiago Morning
Ñublense	1–1 (3-5p)	Huachipato

== Third round ==
Home team	Score	Away team
Unión Española	4–3	Santiago Morning
Santiago Wanderers	2–2 (4-3p)	Audax Italiano
Huachipato	2–1	O'Higgins
Deportes Melipilla	2–1	Rangers
Cobreloa	0–0 (5-4p)	Deportes Antofagasta
Provincial Osorno	1–1 (1-4p)	Universidad de Concepción
Deportes Ovalle	1–1 (4-3p)	Cobresal
Union La Calera	3–3 (4-5p)	Colo-Colo

== Quarterfinals ==
Home team	Score	Away team
Cobreloa	0–3	Universidad de Concepción
Deportes Ovalle	2–2 (4-1p)	Colo-Colo
Santiago Wanderers	0–0 (2-4p)	Huachipato
Deportes Melipilla	0–1	Unión Española

== Semifinals ==
February 11, 2009

Deportes Ovalle	2 – 2	Huachipato
Canales 40'; Canales 52'		Llanos 58'; García 87'
Penalties
Sanchez (penalty scored); Saez (penalty scored); Cadiz (penalty scored)	3–0	(penalty missed) Currimilla; (penalty missed) Zelaye; (penalty missed) García

Estadio Bicentenario de La Florida, La Florida
Attendance: 3,500
Referee: Claudio Fuenzalida

February 11, 2009

Unión Española	1 – 2	Universidad de Concepción
Sierra 3'		Laffatigue 10'; Vargas 13'

Estadio Bicentenario de La Florida, La Florida
Attendance: 3,500
Referee: Claudio Puga

== Final ==
February 17, 2009

Deportes Ovalle	1 – 2	Universidad de Concepción
G. Soto 5'		Vargas 10'; Solís 51'

Estadio Francisco Sánchez Rumoroso, Coquimbo
Attendance: 17,073
Referee: Jorge Osorio

Copa Chile
2008 Champion
U. de Concepción
First Title

== Top goalscorers ==
Goalscorers	Goals	Team
(Argentina) Lucas Barrios	4	Colo-Colo
(Chile) Gamadiel García	4	Huachipato
(Chile) Manuel Neira	4	Unión Española
(Chile) Carlos Espinosa	3	Deportes Melipilla
(Chile) Joel Soto	3	Santiago Wanderers
(Chile) Esteban Paredes	3	Santiago Morning
(Argentina) Julio César Laffatigue	3	Universidad de Concepción

== See also ==
- Primera División 2008
- Primera B
- Tercera División
