= Jorge Alvarado =

Chilean footballer (born 1980)

Personal information
- Full name: Jorge Andrés Alvarado Torres
- Date of birth: 22 February 1980 (age 46)
- Place of birth: Puerto Montt, Chile
- Height: 1.80 m (5 ft 11 in)
- Position: Defender

Senior career*
Years	Team	Apps	(Gls)
2004–2005	Deportes La Serena		
2005–2006	Deportes Puerto Montt		
2007–2008	Ñublense		
2009	Curicó Unido		
2010	Deportes Puerto Montt		
2011	Concepción		
2012–2013	Unión Temuco		
2013–2014	Deportes Puerto Montt		
- * Club domestic league appearances and goals as of 24 March 2020

Jorge Andrés Alvarado (born 22 February 1980) is a Chilean footballer. His last club was Deportes Puerto Montt.
