= Julio César Laffatigue =

Argentine footballer

Personal information
- Full name: Julio César Laffatigue Holub
- Date of birth: 23 February 1980 (age 46)
- Place of birth: Marcos Juárez, Argentina
- Height: 1.80 m (5 ft 11 in)
- Position: Striker

Senior career*
| Years | Team | Apps | (Gls) |
| 1997–1998 | Germinal de Rawson | 0 | (0) |
| 1998–2004 | All Boys | 12 | (2) |
| 1999–2000 | → El Porvenir (loan) | 3 | (0) |
| 2000–2001 | → Independiente (loan) | 0 | (0) |
| 2002 | → Racing de Córdoba (loan) | 6 | (0) |
| 2003–2004 | Deportivo Armenio | 23 | (7) |
| 2004 | Deportes Concepción | 0 | (0) |
| 2005 | Everton | 18 | (4) |
| 2005 | Puerto Montt | 18 | (3) |
| 2006 | Italmaracaibo | 16 | (7) |
| 2006–2007 | UA Maracaibo | 15 | (2) |
| 2007–2008 | Cobresal | 32 | (13) |
| 2008–2009 | Universidad de Concepción | 53 | (21) |
| 2010 | Querétaro | 13 | (2) |
| 2010–2011 | Palestino | 29 | (5) |
| 2012 | Gimnasia y Tiro | 12 | (0) |
- * Club domestic league appearances and goals as of 25 August 2018

Julio César Laffatigue Holub (born 23 February 1980) is an Argentinian retired footballer who played as striker. He has played for teams in his country, Chile, Venezuela and Mexico.

== Club career ==
=== Early career ===
Laffatigue debuted at Germinal de Rawson aged 17. Then he joined Club Atlético All Boys in 1998, when he was sent on loan to El Porvenir. Despite his few minutes there, in 2000 was scouted by first-tier giants Club Atlético Independiente. Nevertheless, he didn't play any game there during the 2000–01 season.

After brief spells at Racing de Córdoba and Deportivo Armenio, he went on his career in Chile, joining Deportes Concepción from the Primera División in 2004. The next year, he moved to Everton de Viña del Mar scoring 4 goals in 18 matches during the 2005 Torneo Apertura. For that year's second half, he signed for Deportes Puerto Montt, also from Chile's top-level, scoring only 3 goals in 18 matches for the Torneo Clausura.

On 25 July 2005, he alongside Puerto Montt's team, were involved in a traffic accident when they were coming back by bus from Talca. Laffatigue declared: "Thank God we are alive, because it was a terrible thing". His most damaged teammate was the keeper Javier di Gregorio, who had to face a six-month injury.

=== Venezuela and Chile ===
==== Italmaracaibo ====
In 2006, Laffatigue left Chile and moved to Venezuela, when he signed for Italmaracaibo (now called Deportivo Petare F.C.). He scored seven goals and played 16 games during 2005–06 Venezuelan football season's last part.

==== Unión Atlético Maracaibo ====
For the incoming season, he joined to Unión Atlético Maracaibo. In 2007's first semester, he helped UA Maracaibo to reach the Torneo Clausura title. That season the team was coached by Chilean manager Jorge Pellicer and was teammate of Diego Rivarola, Chilean giants Universidad de Chile's idol.

==== Cobresal ====
In mid-2007, he returned to Chile and was signed by Cobresal after didn't renew his contract with Maracaibo. During his spell there, it's well remembered his bicycle kick goal against Colo-Colo on 12 August. He had 32 appearances and scored a total of 13 goals for Cobresal.

==== Universidad de Concepción ====
In mid-2008, he joined to Universidad de Concepcion, team coached by Argentinian Marcelo Barticciotto. In that team, he won his second professional title: the 2008–09 Copa Chile (again with Pellicer as manager).

=== Querétaro F.C. ===
On 12 December 2009, it was reported that Laffatigue was appointed as player of Querétaro F.C. from the Mexican Primera División. He only scored 2 goals in 13 matches during his spell: in a 3–2 win over UNAM Pumas on 17 February, and in a 1–1 draw with Santos Laguna on 27 February (when was sent-off by double yellow card).

== Honours ==
=== Club ===
Unión Atlético Maracaibo

- Venezuelan Primera División (1): 2007 Clausura

Universidad de Concepción

- Copa Chile (1): 2008–09
