= Patricio Peralta =

Chilean footballer (born 1985)

Personal information
- Full name: Patricio Gonzalo Peralta Espinoza
- Date of birth: 13 August 1985 (age 41)
- Place of birth: Talcahuano, Chile
- Height: 1.79 m (5 ft 10 in)
- Position: Defender

Senior career*
Years	Team	Apps	(Gls)
2002–2007	Huachipato	98	(1)
2008–2009	Coquimbo Unido	71	(3)
2010	Deportes Puerto Montt	27	(0)
2011	Naval	30	(2)
2012	Unión Temuco	25	(1)
2013–2014	Coquimbo Unido		
2014–2015	Lota Schwager		
- * Club domestic league appearances and goals as of 28 March 2020

Patricio Gonzalo Peralta Espinoza (born 13 August 1985) is a Chilean former footballer. His last club was Lota Schwager.
