= Abarca =

Abarca may refer to:

- Abarca (surname)
- Abarca (shoe), a type of shoe from the Balearic Islands
- Abarca, Melipilla, a village in Melipilla Province, Chile
- Abarca, Talca, a village in Talca Province, Chile
