= 2007 InterLiga =

InterLiga

Tournament details
- Host country: USA
- Dates: 5 January 2007 - 15 January 2007
- Teams: 8 (from FMF confederations)
- Venue: 3 (in 3 host cities)

Tournament statistics
- Matches played: 14
- Goals scored: 35 (2.5 per match)
- Attendance: 229,444 (16,389 per match)
- Top scorer: (Brazil) Kléber Boas (4 Goals)
- Best player: (Brazil) Kléber Boas

The tournament has begun the January 3rd and will give two places in the Copa Libertadores 2007. Eight teams participate in this tournament

== Groups ==
=== Group A ===
Team	Pld	W	D	L	GF	GA	GD	Pts
Necaxa	3	3	0	0	7	4	+3	9
UANL	3	1	1	1	4	3	+1	4
Monterrey	3	1	0	2	3	5	−2	3
Cruz Azul	3	0	1	2	4	6	−2	1

=== Group B ===
Team	Pld	W	D	L	GF	GA	GD	Pts
América	3	2	1	0	4	1	+3	7
Chiapas	3	1	1	1	4	4	0	4
Morelia	3	1	0	2	4	6	−2	3
UAG	3	0	2	1	4	6	−2	2

== Match schedule ==
Matches at Robertson Stadium (Houston, Texas)

1.
3 Jan 07
Monterrey vs UANL
0-2

3-1

2.
3 Jan 07
Cruz Azul vs Necaxa
2-3
3.
4 Jan 07
Chiapas vs Morelia
2-1

2-1

4.
4 Jan 07
América vs UAG
1-1

Matches at Pizza Hut Park (Frisco, Texas)

5.	6 Jan 07	UANL vs Cruz Azul	2-2
6.	6 Jan 07	Necaxa vs Monterrey	3-2
7.	7 Jan 07	Morelia vs América	0-2
8.	7 Jan 07	Chiapas vs UAG	2-2

Matches at The Home Depot Center (Carson, California)

9.	9 Jan 07	Necaxa vs UANL	1-0
10.	9 Jan 07	Monterrey vs Cruz Azul	1-0
11.	10 Jan 07	Morelia vs UAG	3-1
12.	10 Jan 07	América vs Chiapas	1-0
13.	12 Jan 07	Final 1: Necaxa vs Chiapas	1-0
14.	13 Jan 07	Final 2: América vs UANL	0-0 (4-2)

== Finals ==
=== Final 1 ===
2007-01-12

Necaxa (Mexico)	1 – 0	(Mexico) Chiapas
	Report

=== Final 2 ===
2007-01-13

América (Mexico)	0 – 0	(Mexico) UANL
	Report
Penalties
	4 – 2
