= 2005 in Ecuadorian football =

Football in Ecuador
- Season: 2005

The 2005 season is the 83rd season of competitive football in Ecuador.

== National leagues ==
=== Serie A ===
- Champion:
  - Apertura: LDU Quito (8th title)
  - Clausura: El Nacional (12th title)
- International cup qualifiers:
  - 2006 Copa Libertadores: LDU Quito, El Nacional, Deportivo Cuenca
  - 2005 Copa Sudamericana: LDU Quito, El Nacional
- Relegated: Deportivo Quevedo (after Apertura); LDU Loja (after Clausura)

=== Serie B ===
- Winner:
  - Apertura: ESPOLI (2nd title)
  - Clausura: Macará (3rd title)
- Promoted: ESPOLI (after Apertura); Macará (after Clausura)
- Relegated: Tungurahua, Santa Rita

=== Segunda ===
- Winner: Deportivo Azogues
- Promoted: Deportivo Azogues, Imbabura

== Clubs in international competitions ==
Team	2005 Copa Libertadores	2005 Copa Sudamericana
Deportivo Cuenca	Eliminated in the Second Stage	N/A
El Nacional	N/A	Eliminated in the Preliminary Stage
LDU Quito	Eliminated in the Round of 16	Eliminated in the Preliminary Stage
Olmedo	Eliminated in the Second Stage	N/A

== National teams ==
=== Senior team ===
The Ecuador national team played seventeen matches in 2005: their remaining seven 2006 FIFA World Cup qualifiers, and ten friendlies.

==== 2006 FIFA World Cup qualifiers ====
Ecuador finished their 2006 FIFA World Cup qualifying campaign in 3rd place, behind Brazil and Argentina. This marked their second qualification to the tournament.

2005-03-27
16:10

Ecuador	5–2	Paraguay
Valencia 32', 49'; Méndez 45+2', 47'; M. Ayoví 77' (pen.)	(Report)	Cardozo 10' (pen.); Cabañas 14'

Estadio Olímpico Atahualpa, Quito
Attendance: 32,449
Referee: Gustavo Méndez (Uruguay)

2005-03-30
20:00

Peru	2–2	Ecuador
Guerrero 1'; Farfán 58'	(Report)	de la Cruz 4'; Valencia 45'

Estadio Nacional, Lima
Attendance: 40,000
Referee: Carlos Chandía (Chile)

2005-06-04
16:00

Ecuador	2–0	Argentina
Lara 53'; Delgado 89'	(Report)

Estadio Olímpico Atahualpa, Quito
Attendance: 37,583
Referee: Rubén Selman (Chile)

2005-06-08
15:00

Colombia	3–0	Ecuador
Moreno 5', 9'; Arzuaga 70'	(Report)

Estadio Metropolitano, Barranquilla
Attendance: 20,402
Referee: Carlos Eugênio Simon (Brazil)

2005-09-03
15:00

Bolivia	1–2	Ecuador
Vaca 41'	(Report)	Delgado 8', 49'

Estadio Hernando Siles, La Paz
Attendance: 8,434
Referee: Héctor Baldassi (Argentina)

2005-10-08
16:00

Ecuador	0–0	Uruguay
	(Report)

Estadio Olímpico Atahualpa, Quito
Attendance: 37,270
Referee: Márcio Rezende de Freitas (Brazil)

2005-10-12
21:30

Chile	0–0	Ecuador
	(Report)

Estadio Nacional de Chile, Santiago
Attendance: 49,530
Referee: Horacio Elizondo (Argentina)

==== Friendlies ====
2005-01-26

Ecuador	2–0	Panama
O. Tenorio 88', 90+2'

Estadio Bellavista, Ambato
Referee: Luis Vasco (Ecuador)

2005-01-29

Ecuador	2–0	Panama
O. Tenorio 45', 53'

Estadio Rafael Vera Yepez, Babahoyo
Referee: Pedro Ramos (Ecuador)

2005-02-09

Chile	3–0	Ecuador
Maldonado 24'; González 34'; Pinilla 84'

Estadio Sausalito, Viña del Mar
Referee: Gabriel Favale (Argentina)

2005-02-16

Costa Rica	1–2	Ecuador
Alfaro 46'		M. Ayoví 61' (pen.); Guagua 87'

Estadio Eladio Rosabal Cordero, Heredia
Referee: Edgar Durán (Costa Rica)

2004-05-04

Paraguay	0–1	Ecuador
		Méndez 50'

Giants Stadium, New Jersey
Referee: Terry Vaughn (United States)

2004-06-11

Ecuador	1–1	Italy
M. Ayoví 18' (pen.)		Toni 6'

Giants Stadium, New Jersey
Referee: Terry Vaughn (United States)

2004-08-17

Ecuador	3–1	Venezuela
Borja 7'; Lara 40', 67'		Torrealba 70'

Estadio Federativo, Loja
Referee: Luis Vasco (Ecuador)

2005-11-13

Poland	3–0	Ecuador
Klos 2' (pen.); Smolarek 58'; Mila 90+2'

Mini Estadi, Barcelona
Referee: Javier Moreno (Spain)

2005-12-27
LG Cup Four Nations Tournament

Senegal	2–1	Ecuador
Camara 22'; Keita 90'	Report	Borja 40'

Cairo International Stadium, Cairo

2005-12-29
LG Cup Four Nations Tournament

Uganda	2–1	Ecuador
Massa 47'; Muwanga 54'	Report	Kaviedes 2'

Cairo International Stadium, Cairo
