= Joaquín Gatica =

Chilean footballer (born 1986)

Personal information
- Full name: Joaquín Ignacio Nicolás Gatica Jiménez
- Date of birth: January 8, 1986 (age 40)
- Place of birth: Santiago, Chile
- Positions: Defensive midfielder; defender

Youth career
- Colo-Colo
- 2001–2005: Coquimbo Unido

Senior career*
| Years | Team | Apps | (Gls) |
| 2005–2007 | Coquimbo Unido | | |
| 2008 | Deportes Santa Cruz | | |
| 2009 | Corporación Ñuñoa | | |
| 2010 | Bahia | | |
| 2010 | Ipatinga | | |
| 2010 | Provincial Osorno | 1 | (0) |
| 2011 | San Antonio Unido | | |
| 2011 | Triomphe Liancourt | | |
| 2012 | Fernández Vial | 15 | (0) |
| 2013 | Ñublense B | 9 | (0) |
| 2013 | Ayutthaya FC | | |
| 2013 | → Trang FC (loan) | | |
| 2022 | Unión Bellavista | | |
- * Club domestic league appearances and goals

Joaquín Ignacio Nicolás Gatica Jiménez (born 8 January 1986) is a Chilean former footballer who played as a defensive midfielder for clubs in Chile and abroad.

== Club career ==
After taking part of the Colo-Colo youth system, Gatica came to Coquimbo Unido at the age of fifteen, coinciding with well-known players such as Carlos Carmona, Nicolás Crovetto, Alí Manouchehri, Mario Aravena, among others. He was part of the squad that became the 2005 Torneo Apertura runners-up. He played after for Deportes Santa Cruz and Corporación Ñuñoa in the Chilean Tercera División.

In 2010, he went to Brazil thanks to the coach Francisco Cardoso, Quinho, and had stints with Bahia and Ipatinga.

After a brief stint with Provincial Osorno and being a member of San Antonio Unido, he emigrated to Central America alongside his fellows Salvatore Abarca and Víctor Retamal thanks to the coach José Valladares and joined Triomphe de Liancourt in the Ligue Haïtienne in 2011. Back in Chile, he played for Fernández Vial and Ñublense B.

In March 2013, he joined Thailand side Ayutthaya FC, being loaned to Trang FC in the same year.

He went on playing football at amateur level for clubs such as Nino Landa from Peñalolén, and Palestino from Chicureo, even taking part in the 2022 Copa Chile as a member of Unión Bellavista from Coquimbo.

== After football ==
He keeps a friendship with some former fellows in Coquimbo Unido such as Carlos Carmona, Nicolás Crovetto and Alí Manouchehri.

He has served as head and coordinator of municipal deputations for the Municipality of Coquimbo.
