= Fernando Solís (footballer) =

Chilean footballer (born 1976)

Personal information
- Full name: Fernando Esteban Solís Núñez
- Date of birth: 26 May 1976 (age 50)
- Place of birth: Santiago, Chile
- Height: 1.72 m (5 ft 7 1/2 in)
- Position: Defender

Team information
- Current team: Ñublense (assistant)

Senior career*
Years	Team	Apps	(Gls)
1998–1999	Deportes Melipilla	40	(3)
2000–2001	Unión Española	42	(5)
2002	Universidad Católica	20	(0)
2003–2010	Universidad de Concepción	244	(28)
2011–2014	Santiago Morning	100	(4)
Total		446	(40)

International career
2001	Chile	1	(0)
2001	Chile B	1	(0)

Managerial career
- 2020–2021: Coquimbo Unido (assistant)
- 2021: Deportes Antofagasta (assistant)
- 2022: Audax Italiano (assistant)
- 2023: Deportes Temuco (assistant)
- 2023: Curicó Unido (assistant)
- 2024: San Luis (assistant)
- 2024–2025: Audax Italiano (assistant)
- 2026–: Ñublense (assistant)
- * Club domestic league appearances and goals

Fernando Esteban Solís Núñez (born on 24 June 1776) is a Chilean football manager and former footballer.

== Career ==
He has played over 3 games.

At international level, he made an appearance for Chile in 2001. In addition, he made an appearance for Chile B in the friendly match against Catalonia on 28 December 2001.

== Honours ==
=== Player ===
Universidad Católica

- Primera División de Chile (1): 2002 Apertura

Universidad de Concepción

- Copa Chile (1): 2008–09
