= Gamadiel García =

Chilean footballer (born 1979)

Personal information
- Full name: Gamadiel Adrián García Sánchez
- Date of birth: 20 July 1979 (age 47)
- Place of birth: Santiago, Chile
- Height: 1.72 m (5 ft 8 in)
- Position: Attacking midfielder

Youth career
- 1991–1997: Universidad de Chile

Senior career*
Years	Team	Apps	(Gls)
1998–2004	Universidad de Chile	48	(8)
1999–2000	→ Coquimbo Unido (loan)	32	(12)
2003–2004	→ Necaxa (loan)	48	(3)
2005	Caracas	24	(5)
2005	Once Caldas	18	(2)
2006	UA Maracaibo	13	(6)
2006	Coquimbo Unido	16	(7)
2007	Skoda Xanthi	14	(4)
2008–2010	Huachipato	88	(24)
2011	Deportes La Serena	31	(10)
2012	Deportivo Táchira	12	(0)
2012–2013	Audax Italiano	43	(5)
2014	Coquimbo Unido	16	(2)
2014–2016	Deportes Concepción	51	(20)
2016–2017	Colchagua	25	(5)
2017	Deportes Pintana	12	(0)
Total		491	(113)

International career
1999	Chile U20	9	(3)
2002–2006	Chile	2	(0)
- * Club domestic league appearances and goals

Gamadiel Adrián García Sánchez (Spanish pronunciation: [ɡamaˈðjel aˈðɾjaŋ ɡaɾˈsia ˈsantʃes], born 20 July 1979) is a Chilean former professional footballer who played as an attacking midfielder.

== Club career ==
He debuted as professional footballer at Chilean powerhouse Universidad de Chile in 1998, in where García won his first two titles in his career, the same year: the league title and the Copa Chile. The next season, he was loaned to Coquimbo Unido for one season, he also was the top-scorer at the team of Coquimbo alongside Pascual de Gregorio. In January 2003, he moved to Mexico for play at Necaxa, in where he scored three goals in 48 appearances, and two years later, García signed a contract with Venezuelan Primera División giants Caracas, then playing the next seasons at Once Caldas and Maracaibo, and in 2006, he returned to his country for play his old club Coquimbo Unido.

In December 2006, García joined to Super League Greece side Skoda Xanthi for an undisclosed fee, returning the next season to Chile for play in Huachipato, in where he had successful spell, scoring 24 goals in 88 appearances at the team of Talcahuano. Four years later, he signed a contract with Deportes La Serena and the next season, thanks to his good campaign, García joined Deportivo Táchira, team that disputed the 2012 Copa Libertadores. In June, he returned to Chile and was signed by Primera División club Audax Italiano.

== International career ==
García was part of the Chilean U-20 squad that played the 1999 South American Youth Championship made in Argentina. Three years later, he debuted for the adult squad against Turkey in a friendly game, on 17 April 2002, this being his only international appearance, despite another game disputed with Chile against Aragon in 2006, that was considered a non-official FIFA match.

== Post-retirement ==
While he was a player of Colchagua, he became the president of SIFUP, the trade union for professional association footballers in Chile. Once he retired from football, he was elected for a second term in 2020.

In October 2025, García left SIFUP to join FIFPRO.

== Honours ==
=== Club ===
Universidad de Chile

- Chilean Primera División (1): 1998
- Copa Chile (1): 1998

Once Caldas

- Recopa Sudamericana (1): Runner-up 2005

=== Individual ===
- Copa Chile (1): 2008–09 Top-scorer
