= 2005 in Paraguayan football =

The following article presents a summary of the 2005 football (soccer) season in Paraguay.

== First division results ==
The first division tournament was divided in two sections: the Apertura and the Clausura and had 10 teams participating in a two-round all-play-all system. The team with the most points at the end of the two rounds was crowned as the champion.

=== Torneo Apertura ===
Position	Team	Played	Wins	Draws	Losses	Scored	Conceded	Points
1	Cerro Porteño	18	10	6	2	30	15	36
2	Guaraní	18	9	4	5	21	18	31
3	Nacional	18	9	3	6	25	22	30
4	3 de Febrero	18	7	7	4	24	17	28
5	12 de Octubre	18	6	8	4	22	22	26
6	Tacuary	18	4	11	3	24	19	23
7	Libertad	18	4	7	7	21	23	19
8	Sportivo Luqueño	18	3	8	7	20	22	17
9	General Caballero ZC	18	2	7	9	16	28	13
10	Olimpia	18	2	7	9	10	27	13

=== Torneo Clausura ===
Position	Team	Played	Wins	Draws	Losses	Scored	Conceded	Points
1	Cerro Porteño	18	11	3	4	34	20	36
2	Libertad	18	9	5	4	30	23	32
3	Olimpia	18	9	4	5	29	20	31
4	3 de Febrero	18	8	4	6	31	25	28
5	Nacional	18	7	6	5	24	20	27
6	Sportivo Luqueño	18	6	7	5	27	26	25
7	Tacuary	18	6	6	6	26	31	24
8	Guaraní	18	6	2	10	18	25	20
9	12 de Octubre	18	2	8	8	18	33	14
10	General Caballero ZC	18	3	1	14	15	29	10

=== Championship game playoff ===
Since Cerro Porteño won both the Apertura and Clausura tournaments they were declared as the national champions and no playoff game was played.

=== Relegation / Promotion ===
- General Caballero ZC automatically relegated to the second division after finishing last in the aggregate points table.
- 2 de Mayo and Club Fernando de la Mora promoted to the first division by finishing first and second respectively in the second division tournament.

=== Qualification to international competitions ===
- Cerro Porteño qualified to the 2006 Copa Libertadores by winning the Torneo Apertura and Torneo Clausura; and to the 2005 Copa Sudamericana and 2006 Copa Sudamericana by winning the Apertura and Clausura tournaments.

==== Runners-up playoff game ====
- Libertad (runners-up of the Clausura) qualified to the Copa Libertadores 2006 by winning the runners-up playoff game against Guaraní (runners-up of the Apertura) by an aggregate score of 5–3.
December 14, 2005

Guaraní	2–1	Libertad

December 18, 2005

Libertad	4–1	Guaraní

==== Copa Sudamericana 2005 Qualifiers ====
Semifinals

Team #1	Score	Team #2	Date
Nacional	3-1	3 de Febrero	June 29
Guaraní	2-1	12 de Octubre	June 29

Final

Team #1	Score	Team #2	Date
Guaraní	2-1	Nacional	July 3

- Guaraní qualified to the Copa Sudamericana 2005 by winning the final.

==== Copa Sudamericana 2006 Qualifiers ====
Played between the Clausura tournament winner and the second-best finisher in the aggregate point table (Nacional).

Team #1	Score	Team #2	Date
Nacional	1-6	Libertad	December 22

== Lower divisions results ==
Level	Tournament	Champion
2nd	Intermedia	2 de Mayo
3rd (G.A. teams)	Primera de Ascenso	Club Rubio Ñú
3rd (interior teams)	UFI Champions Cup	Club Choré Central
4th (G.A. teams)	Segunda de Ascenso	1° de Marzo

== Paraguayan teams in international competitions ==
- Copa Libertadores 2005:
  - Cerro Porteño: round of 16
  - Club Libertad: group-stage
  - Tacuary: preliminary round
- Copa Sudamericana 2005:
  - Cerro Porteño: round of 16
  - Club Guaraní: preliminary first round

== Paraguay national team ==
The following table lists all the games played by the Paraguay national football team in official competitions during 2005.

Date	Venue	Opponents	Score	Comp	Paraguay scorers	Report
March 27, 2005	Estadio Olímpico Atahualpa; Quito, Ecuador	Ecuador	5 - 2	WCQ 2006	Cardozo 10'; Cabañas 14'	Report
March 30, 2005	Defensores del Chaco; Asunción, Paraguay	Chile	2 - 1	WCQ 2006	Morinigo 37'; Cardozo 59'	Report
June 5, 2005	Beira Rio; Porto Alegre, Brazil	Brazil	4 - 1	WCQ 2006	Santa Cruz 72'	Report
June 8, 2005	Defensores del Chaco; Asunción, Paraguay	Bolivia	4 - 1	WCQ 2006	Gamarra 17'; Santa Cruz 45+1'; J.C. Cáceres 54'; Núñez 68'	Report
September 3, 2005	Defensores del Chaco; Asunción, Paraguay	Argentina	1 - 0	WCQ 2006	Santa Cruz 14'	Report
October 8, 2005	José Pachencho Romero; Maracaibo, Venezuela	Venezuela	0 - 1	WCQ 2006	Haedo Valdez 64'	Report
October 12, 2005	Defensores del Chaco; Asunción, Paraguay	Colombia	0 - 1	WCQ 2006	-	Report
