= Prat de Punta Arenas =

Chilean football club

Prat
- Full name: Club Social y Deportivo Prat
- Nickname: Pratinos
- Founded: January 19, 1931
- Ground: Estadio Confederación Deportiva, Punta Arenas, Chile
- Capacity: 4,500
- Chairman: (Chile)
- Manager: (Chile) Iván Barrera
- League: Asociación Punta Arenas
Home colours

Club Social y Deportivo Prat is a football team in the city of Punta Arenas, Chile. It was founded on January 19, 1931 and plays in the Asociación Punta Arenas of ANFA.

== History ==
The club was founded on January 19, 1931 in Punta Arenas, Chile.

In 2009 the team was crowned champion of the Campeonato Regional de Clubes de la ANFA in the Magallanes Region, defeating Sokol, earning them a spot to play the Copa Chile this season.

In the first phase the Copa defeated Lord Cochrane. In the second round it was eliminated by Provincial Osorno after losing 2:1 at home.

In 2010 the team won a championship qualifier against Sokol, Cosal and Bories, earning them a spot to play the Copa Chile Bicentenario. In this tournament they lost the matches with Puerto Montt for 10:0 in the aggregate.

== Copa Chile ==
Season	Competition	Round	Country	Team	Home	Away	Aggregate
2009	Copa Chile	Primera Ronda	(Chile)	Lord Cochrane	1-0	3-3	4-3
2009	Copa Chile	Segunda Ronda	(Chile)	Osorno	1-2		1-2
2010	Copa Chile	Primera Ronda Fase Final	(Chile)	Puerto Montt	7-5	7-5	11-10

== Players ==
=== First-team squad ===
As of 3 February 2019

Note: Flags indicate national team as defined under FIFA eligibility rules; some limited exceptions apply. Players may hold more than one non-FIFA nationality.

No.	Pos.	Nation	Player
1	GK	CHI	Camilo Jerez
2	DF	CHI	Pedro Pablo Bahamondez Vera
9	FW	CHI	Brian Ojeda

== Personnel ==
=== Current technical staff ===
Position	Name		
Manager	(Chile) Iván Barrera	Adjunto	(Chile) Ricardo Ruiz

== Managers ==
- (Chile) Manuel Cárdenas (2000 - 2005)
- (Chile) Mario Alvarez (2005 - 2006)
- (Chile) Guillermo Faúndez (2006 - 2009)
- (Chile) Miguel Lara (2009 - 2022)
- (Chile) Cristián Hernández (2022 - 2023)
- (Chile) Jorge Oyarzún (2023 - 2024)
- (Chile) José Luis Díaz (2025)
- (Chile) Iván Barrera (2025 -)

== Honours ==
- Campeonato Regional Magallanes: 8

(1991, 2002, 2003, 2006, 2007, 2009, 2010, 2015)
