= Mauricio Casierra =

Colombian football left back (born 1985)

Personal information
- Full name: Mauricio Ferney Casierra
- Date of birth: December 8, 1985 (age 40)
- Place of birth: Tumaco, Nariño, Colombia
- Height: 1.75 m (5 ft 9 in)
- Position: Left-back

Team information
- Current team: Deportivo Pereira

Senior career*
Years	Team	Apps	(Gls)
2002–2006	Once Caldas	114	(3)
2006–2007	Estudiantes	22	(0)
2007–2008	Once Caldas	29	(1)
2008–2010	Millonarios	57	(3)
2010–2012	Belgrano	17	(1)
2012–2013	Once Caldas	45	(1)
2014	Deportivo Cali	9	(0)
2014–2015	Sarmiento	44	(1)
2016–2018	San Martín (SJ)	53	(1)
2018	Deportivo Pasto	22	(0)
2019–	Deportivo Pereira	5	(0)

International career
2005	Colombia U20	13	(0)
2006	Colombia	2	(0)
- * Club domestic league appearances and goals as of 3 March 2019

Mauricio Ferney Casierra (born December 8, 1985) is a Colombian football left back who plays for Deportivo Pereira.

== Career ==
=== Club ===
Casierra started his career in Colombia in 2002 with Once Caldas. In 2004, he was part of the squad that won the Copa Libertadores 2004.

Casierra was signed by Estudiantes in 2006, in his first season with the club they won the Apertura 2006 title. After two spells back in Colombia with Once Caldas and Millonarios, he returned to Argentine to play for Belgrano in the second division.

=== International ===
In 2006, he was selected to represent the Colombia national football team for the first time.

== Honours ==
Season	Club	Title
2004	Once Caldas	Copa Libertadores
Apertura 2006	Estudiantes	Primera Division Argentina
