= Abarca, Talca =

Coordinates: 35°13′11.35″S 71°50′42.33″W

Abarca is a village located in Talca Province, Chile. It's at the south of Tapihue, at the west of Las Ñipas, and north of Los Puercos Creek.
