= Matías Jara =

Argentine footballer

Personal information
- Full name: Matías Maximiliano Jara
- Date of birth: April 6, 1987 (age 39)
- Place of birth: Trelew, Argentina
- Height: 1.82 m (6 ft 0 in)
- Position: Forward

Youth career
- C.A.I.

Senior career*
| Years | Team | Apps | (Gls) |
| 2005–2011 | C.A.I. | 62 | (11) |
| 2005 | → Deportivo Madryn (loan) | 0 | (0) |
| 2009 | → Godoy Cruz (loan) | 14 | (2) |
| 2010 | → Huachipato (loan) | 15 | (1) |
| 2010–2011 | → Chacarita Juniors (loan) | 19 | (2) |
| 2011–2012 | Guillermo Brown | 25 | (2) |
| 2012 | FC Dallas | 0 | (0) |
| 2013 | Central Córdoba SdE | 12 | (0) |
| 2013–2014 | Temperley | 32 | (2) |
| 2016 | Güemes | 8 | (1) |
| 2017–2018 | Sportsman | 6 | (0) |
| 2019 | C.A.I. | 15 | (4) |
| 2020–2021 | Huracán de Comodoro | 10 | (8) |
| 2022 | Petroquímica | – | (–) |
| 2024 | Florentino Ameghino | – | (–) |
- * Club domestic league appearances and goals

Matías Maximiliano Jara (born April 6, 1987, in Buenos Aires) is an Argentine former professional footballer who played as a forward.

== Career ==
Jara started playing for Comisión de Actividades Infantiles (C.A.I.), a team from the southern city of Comodoro Rivadavia, and Deportivo Madryn. He was an important part of the team that avoided relegation from the Primera B Nacional (second division) during the 2007–08 season after defeating Patronato in the relegation playoff. Jara scored two goals in the second game to secure the 5–1 overall victory.

Jara joined Godoy Cruz in the Argentine First Division for the 2009-10 season. He scored the first goal of the Apertura tournament on Godoy Cruz' victory 2–0 over Gimnasia y Esgrima de La Plata. He also scored one goal and assisted in another in Godoy Cruz' historical 3–2 victory against Boca Juniors in the Bombonera stadium.

In January 2010 Jara joined Chilean side Huachipato. However, he returned to his home country in August of that same year, joining second division side Chacarita Juniors.

Jara signed with FC Dallas of Major League Soccer on August 7, 2012. However, he was released just three months later without making a first team appearance.

Back in Argentina, Jara played for Central Córdoba de Santiago del Estero, Güemes, Sportsman, C.A.I., Huracán de Comodoro Rivadavia and Petroquímica de Comodoro Rivadavia. In 2024, he played for Florentino Ameghino at amateur level.

== Personal life ==
His son, Tobías Agustín, is a football forward who has been with the youth teams of Estudiantes de La Plata, C.A.I. and Defensa y Justicia.
