= C.D. Academia Samuel Reyes =

Chilean football club

Academia Samuel Reyes
- Full name: Club Deportivo Academia de Fútbol Samuel Reyes
- Nicknames: Lilas, La Acadé
- Founded: May 11, 2002
- Ground: Estadio ANFA Luis Hernán Álvarez; Curicó, Chile
- Capacity: 1.000
- Chairman: Patricio Mora
- Manager: Samuel Reyes
- League: Tercera División B
Home colours	Away colours

Club Deportivo Academia de Fútbol Samuel Reyes is a Chilean Football club, their home town is Curicó, Chile.

The club was founded on May 11, 2002 and participated for two years in Tercera División B.

== Seasons played ==
- 2 seasons in Tercera División B

== See also ==
- Chilean football league system
