= Estadio Federativo =

Multi-use stadium in Azogues, Ecuador

Coordinates: 2.73445°S 78.85157°W

Estadio Federativo is a multi-use stadium in Azogues, Ecuador. It is currently used mostly for football matches and is the home stadium of Club Deportivo Federativo of Azogues. The stadium holds 3,400 people.
