= Édison Chará =

Colombian footballer (1980-2011)

Personal information
- Full name: Edison Hipólito Chará Lucumí
- Date of birth: 2 October 1980
- Place of birth: Padilla, Cauca, Colombia
- Date of death: 19 October 2011 (aged 31)
- Place of death: Cali, Colombia
- Height: 1.78 m (5 ft 10 in)
- Position: Striker

Youth career
- 2000: Atlético Huila

Senior career*
Years	Team	Apps	(Gls)
2001	Deportivo Pereira	9	(1)
2001–2005	Deportivo Cali	5	(1)
2002	→ Atlético Huila (loan)	4	(0)
2004	→ Montevideo Wanderers (loan)	9	(1)
2004–2005	→ América de Cali (loan)	22	(5)
2005–2006	Once Caldas	14	(0)
2006	Cienciano	18	(7)
2007	Sporting Cristal	27	(2)
2008	Once Caldas	9	(1)
2008–2010	Juan Aurich	49	(12)
2010–2011	Deportivo Pereira	10	(0)
2011	Unión Comercio	1	(0)
2011	Dalian Aerbin	8	(1)
- * Club domestic league appearances and goals

Édison Hipólito Chará Lucumí (2 October 1980 – 19 October 2011) was a Colombian football striker. His last team was Chinese club Dalian Aerbin.

== Career ==
Chará began his career with Deportivo Cali and joined in January 2003 to local rival América de Cali. After seventeen games, when scored four goals for América de Cali, was transferred to the Peruvian club Cienciano. The fast striker played one year for Cienciano, where they scored nine goals in twenty one games and was scouted from Sporting Cristal on 28 December 2006. Chará played only ten games and scored four goals in the season 2007/2008, was linked with Energie Cottbus and left after of the season his club to sign for Juan Aurich.

Chará moved to China League One club Dalian Aerbin in March 2011 and was released in July 2011.

== Death ==
Chará died at a hospital in Cali on 19 October 2011, after having been shot by hitmen in Puerto Tejada, Cauca.
