= Daniel Núñez =

Daniel Núñez may refer to:

- Daniel Núñez (weightlifter) (born 1958), Cuban weightlifter
- Daniel Núñez (Chilean politician) (born 1971), Chilean politician

== See also ==
- Daniel Núñez del Prado (1840–1891), Bolivian medical doctor, educator and civil servant
