= Juan Krupoviesa =

Argentine footballer

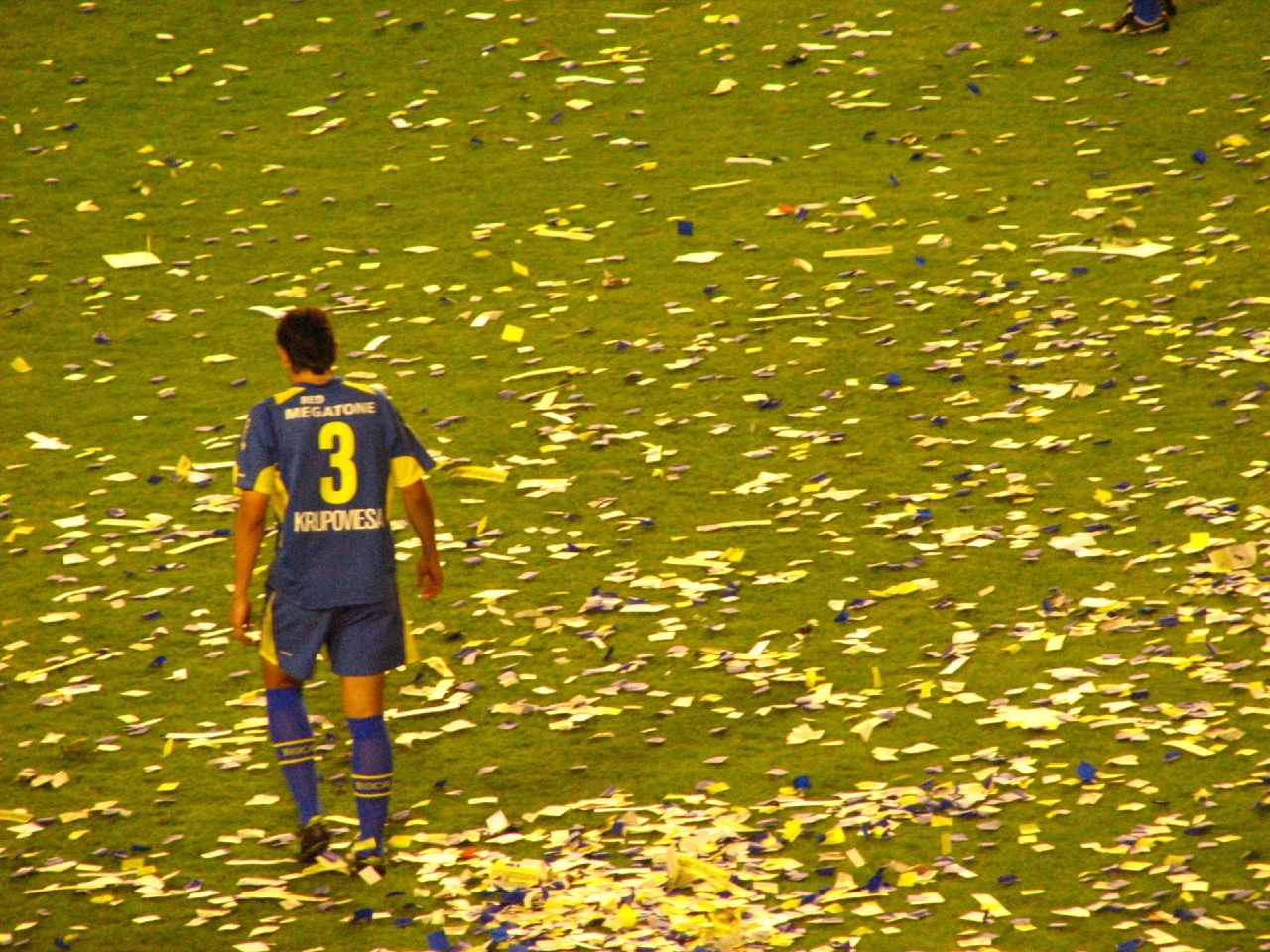
- Krupoviesa vs Pumas, December 2005

Personal information
- Full name: Juan Ángel Krupoviesa
- Date of birth: 16 April 1979 (age 47)
- Place of birth: San Miguel de Tucumán, Argentina
- Height: 1.78 m (5 ft 10 in)
- Position: Left back

Team information
- Current team: Boca Juniors (interim assistant)

Youth career
- Estudiantes

Senior career*
Years	Team	Apps	(Gls)
1999–2005	Estudiantes	110	(7)
2005–2010	Boca Juniors	72	(4)
2008	→ Marseille (loan)	6	(0)
2010–2011	Arsenal de Sarandí	19	(1)
2011–2012	Chacarita Juniors	5	(0)

Managerial career
- 2014–2018: Estudiantes (youth)
- 2018–2019: Estudiantes (assistant)
- 2020–: Boca Juniors II (assistant)
- 2021–: Boca Juniors (interim assistant)
- * Club domestic league appearances and goals

Juan Ángel Krupoviesa (born 16 April 1979) is a retired Argentine footballer who played as a full back and current interim assistant coach of Boca Juniors.

== Club career ==
Born in Tucumán, Krupoviesa had his professional debut with Estudiantes de La Plata, where he played from 1999 until 2005. In that same year, he moved to Boca Juniors. Krupoviesa won five titles in his first two years at Boca, but in October 2006 he suffered a serious injury that kept him out of the team for the remainder of the 2006–07 season.

In January 2008, he joined Marseille on loan, but he returned to Boca in July 2008.

With 31 years of age, Krupoviesa joined Arsenal de Sarandí on a free transfer for the beginning of the 2010–11 season.

== Coaching career ==
In 2014, Kropoviesa re-joined his former club Estudiantes as a youth coach at the club.

In March 2018, it was reported that Krupoviesa would leave his position at Estudiantes in June 2018 to join Almagro as an assistant coach to Sebastián Battaglia. Failing to secure promotion on May 11, Battaglia was fired before Krupoviesa ever managed to take up his new role. Krupoviesa instead continued at Estudiantes, however, in a different role. He was appointed assistant coach to newly appointed first team manager at Estudiantes, Leandro Benítez, in June 2018. He left Estudiantes in February 2019.

In the beginning of 2020, Battaglia was appointed manager of Boca Juniors' reserve team, with Krupoviesa becoming his assistant.

== Honours ==
Season	Club	Title
Apertura 2005	Boca Juniors	Primera División Argentina
2005	Boca Juniors	Recopa Sudamericana
2005	Boca Juniors	Copa Sudamericana
Clausura 2006	Boca Juniors	Primera División Argentina
2006	Boca Juniors	Recopa Sudamericana
