= Obdulia Torres Abarca =

Mexican politician

- Born: 3 September 1961 (age 64); Chiapas, Mexico
- Occupation: Politician
- Political party: PRD

Obdulia Magdalena Torres Abarca (born 3 September 1961) is a Mexican politician from the Party of the Democratic Revolution. From 2009 to 2012 she served as Deputy of the LXI Legislature of the Mexican Congress representing Chiapas.
