= 2005–06 in Venezuelan football =

The following article presents a summary of the 2005-06 football season in Venezuela.

== Torneo Apertura ("Opening" Tournament) ==
Pos	Team	Points	Played	Won	Drawn	Lost	For	Against	Diff
1	U.A. Maracaibo	41	18	12	5	1	28	11	+17
2	Deportivo Táchira F.C.	31	18	9	4	5	32	23	+9
3	Mineros de Guayana	27	18	7	6	5	24	19	+5
4	Carabobo F.C.	27	18	7	6	5	28	24	+4
5	Caracas F.C.	24	18	7	3	8	28	25	+3
6	C.D. Italmaracaibo	24	18	6	6	6	23	22	+1
7	Aragua F.C.	22	18	6	4	8	16	27	-11
8	Trujillanos F.C.	18	18	4	6	8	14	24	-10
9	Estudiantes de Mérida F.C.	15	18	3	6	9	21	30	-9
10	Monagas S.C.	15	18	3	6	9	19	28	-9

== Torneo Clausura ("Closing" Tournament) ==
Pos	Team	Points	Played	Won	Drawn	Lost	For	Against	Diff
1	Caracas F.C.	36	18	10	6	2	29	14	+15
2	Deportivo Táchira F.C.	31	18	8	7	3	25	22	+3
3	Carabobo F.C.	27	18	7	6	5	26	22	+4
4	Mineros de Guayana	27	18	7	6	5	21	22	-1
5	Monagas S.C.	25	18	5	10	3	21	16	+5
6	Aragua F.C.	25	18	7	4	7	21	21	0
7	U.A. Maracaibo	20	18	3	11	4	21	20	+1
8	Estudiantes de Mérida F.C.	18	18	5	3	10	27	33	-6
9	Trujillanos F.C.	17	18	3	8	7	18	27	-9
10	C.D. Italmaracaibo	10	18	1	7	10	18	32	-14

== "Championship" playoff ==
Caracas F.C. and U.A. Maracaibo ended with one championship each at the end of the Apertura and Clausura. Tournament rules establish that a playoff game is required.

May 17, 2006

U.A. Maracaibo	1 – 1	Caracas F.C.
C. Cásseres 35'		J.M. Rey 41' (pen.)

Estadio José Pachencho Romero, Maracaibo

May 21, 2006

Caracas F.C.	3 – 0	U.A. Maracaibo
W. Carpintero 73' 77'; A. Guerra 87'

Estadio Brígido Iriarte, Caracas

Primera División Venezolana 2005-06 Winners

Caracas F.C.
8th Title

== Aggregate Table ==
Pos	Team	Points	Played	Won	Drawn	Lost	For	Against	Diff	Notes
1.	Deportivo Táchira F.C.	62	36	17	11	8	57	44	+13	Pre-Copa Libertadores
2.	U.A. Maracaibo	61	36	15	16	5	49	31	+18	Copa Libertadores 2007
3.	Caracas F.C.	60	36	17	9	10	57	39	+18	Copa Libertadores 2007
4.	Carabobo F.C.	54	36	14	12	10	54	46	+8	Copa Sudamericana 2006
5.	Mineros de Guayana	54	36	14	12	10	45	41	+4	Copa Sudamericana 2006
6.	Aragua F.C.	47	36	13	8	15	37	48	-11	
7.	Monagas S.C.	40	36	8	16	12	40	43	-3	
8.	Trujillanos F.C.	35	36	7	14	15	32	51	-19	
9.	C.D. Italmaracaibo	34	36	7	13	16	41	54	-13	Relegated
10.	Estudiantes de Mérida F.C.	33	36	8	9	19	48	63	-15	Relegated
