= Ismael Espiga =

Uruguayan footballer (born 1978)

Personal information
- Full name: Ismael Sandor Espiga Coccolo
- Date of birth: 5 September 1978 (age 48)
- Place of birth: Carmelo, Uruguay
- Height: 1.84 m (6 ft 0 in)
- Position: Striker

Youth career
- Atlético Fernandino

Senior career*
Years	Team	Apps	(Gls)
1998–2000	Guaraní de Minas	–	(–)
1999–2000	Lavalleja (league team)	–	(–)
2000–2001	Maldonado (league team)	–	(–)
2001	Punta del Este	–	(–)
2002	Deportivo Maldonado	34	(16)
2003	Montevideo Wanderers	21	(4)
2004	Macará	6	(2)
2004–2005	Bella Vista	24	(22)
2005	Once Caldas	17	(6)
2006	Bella Vista	10	(2)
2006	Universidad de Concepción	8	(2)
2006	Santiago Morning	2	(0)
2007	Juventud Las Piedras	29	(9)
2008	Miramar Misiones	7	(0)
2008–2009	Olmedo	0	(0)
2009	Deportivo Morón	0	(0)
2009	Central Español	11	(7)
2010	Lobos BUAP	5	(0)
2010–2011	Juventude	10	(3)
2011–2012	Rampla Juniors	15	(3)
2013	Unión Comercio	6	(0)
2014–2015	Albion	–	(–)
2015	Miramar Misiones	9	(2)
2016–2019	Rocha (league team)	–	(–)
2016	Nacional de Castillos	–	(–)
2017	Plaza Congreso	–	(–)
2018	Atlético Lavalleja	–	(–)
2018–2019	La Paloma	–	(–)
2019	Ituzaingó	–	(–)
- * Club domestic league appearances and goals

Ismael Sandor Espiga Coccolo (born 5 September 1978, in Carmelo) is a Uruguayan former footballer who played as a striker.

== Teams ==
- (Uruguay) Atlético Fernandino (youth)
- (Uruguay) Guaraní de Minas 1998–2000
- (Uruguay) Lavalleja (league team) 1999–2000
- (Uruguay) Maldonado (league team) 2000–2001
- (Uruguay) Punta del Este 2001
- (Uruguay) Deportivo Maldonado 2002
- (Uruguay) Montevideo Wanderers 2003
- (Ecuador) Macará 2004
- (Uruguay) Bella Vista 2004–2005
- (Colombia) Once Caldas 2005
- (Uruguay) Bella Vista 2006
- (Chile) Universidad de Concepción 2006
- (Chile) Santiago Morning 2006
- (Uruguay) Juventud Las Piedras 2007
- (Uruguay) Miramar Misiones 2008
- (Ecuador) Olmedo 2008–2009
- (Argentina) Deportivo Morón 2009
- (Uruguay) Central Español 2009
- (Mexico) Lobos BUAP 2010
- (Brazil) Juventude 2010–2011
- (Uruguay) Rampla Juniors 2011–2012
- (Peru) Unión Comercio 2013
- (Uruguay) Albion 2014–2015
- (Uruguay) Miramar Misiones 2015
- (Uruguay) Rocha (league team) 2016–2019
- (Uruguay) Nacional de Castillos 2016
- (Uruguay) Plaza Congreso 2017
- (Uruguay) Atlético Lavalleja 2018
- (Uruguay) La Paloma 2018–2019
- (Uruguay) Ituzaingó 2019
