= Corporación Peñalolén =

Chilean football club

- Full name: Corporación de Deportes de Peñalolén
- Nickname(s): Amarillos, Peñalolelinos
- Founded: January 11, 2007
- Ground: Municipal de Peñalolén; Peñalolén, Chile
- Capacity: 3,500
- Chairman: María Loreto Barriga
- Manager: Juan Rodríguez
- League: Tercera División B
- 2010: 6th Central Zone (Eliminated in 1st phase)
Home colours	Away colours

Corporación Peñalolén is a Chilean football club based in Peñalolén. They currently play in the fourth level of Chilean football, the Tercera División B.

The club were founded on January 11, 2007 and participated for 3 years in Tercera División A and 2 years in Tercera División B.

== Seasons played ==
- 3 seasons in Tercera División A
- 2 seasons in Tercera División B

== See also ==
- Chilean football league system
