= 2006 Paraguayan Primera División season =

Paraguayan football season

The 2006 División Profesional season was the 72nd season of professional football in Paraguay.

== Torneo Apertura ==
=== Standings ===
Pos	Team	Pld	W	D	L	GF	GA	GD	Pts	Qualification or relegation
1	Libertad	20	13	3	4	42	20	+22	42	2007 Copa Libertadores Second Stage
2	Cerro Porteño	20	12	4	4	36	22	+14	40	
3	Tacuary	20	10	4	6	34	33	+1	34	
4	Sportivo Luqueño	20	9	6	5	39	29	+10	33	
5	12 de Octubre	20	8	4	8	25	31	−6	28	
6	Olimpia	20	8	3	9	34	30	+4	27	
7	2 de Mayo	20	6	7	7	29	33	−4	25	
8	Nacional	20	6	6	8	42	36	+6	24	
9	Guaraní	20	5	6	9	34	43	−9	21	
10	3 de Febrero	20	5	4	11	29	41	−12	19	
11	Fernando de la Mora	20	3	3	14	21	47	−26	12	

== Torneo Clausura ==
=== Standings ===
Pos	Team	Pld	W	D	L	GF	GA	GD	Pts	Qualification or relegation
1	Cerro Porteño	20	16	4	0	35	10	+25	52	2007 Copa Libertadores Second Stage
2	Libertad	20	12	5	3	35	20	+15	41	
3	2 de Mayo	20	9	6	5	27	21	+6	33	
4	Tacuary	20	8	8	4	25	19	+6	32	
5	Nacional	20	8	5	7	29	21	+8	29	
6	Olimpia	20	5	8	7	22	22	0	23	
7	Sportivo Luqueño	20	5	8	7	20	30	−10	23	
8	Guaraní	20	4	9	7	21	26	−5	21	
9	3 de Febrero	20	4	5	11	17	26	−9	17	
10	12 de Octubre	20	3	5	12	21	35	−14	14	
11	Fernando de la Mora	20	3	3	14	14	36	−22	12	

== Championship game playoff ==
The national championship game was played between the Apertura and Clausura tournaments winners.

December 6, 2006

Cerro Porteño	0–0	Libertad

December 10, 2006

Libertad	2–1	Cerro Porteño

Libertad declared as national champions by aggregate score of 2–1.

=== Aggregate table ===
Pos	Team	Pld	W	D	L	GF	GA	GD	Pts	Qualification or relegation
1	Cerro Porteño	40	28	8	4	71	32	+39	92	Qualified to Copa Libertadores 2007
2	Libertad	40	25	8	7	77	40	+37	83	Qualified to Copa Libertadores 2007 and Copa Sudamericana 2007
3	Tacuary	40	18	12	10	59	52	+7	66	Qualified to Copa Libertadores 2007 and Copa Sudamericana 2007
4	2 de Mayo	40	15	13	12	56	54	+2	58	
5	Sportivo Luqueño	40	14	14	12	59	59	0	56	
6	Nacional	40	14	11	15	71	57	+14	53	
7	Olimpia	40	13	11	16	56	52	+4	50	
8	Guaraní	40	9	15	16	55	69	−14	42	
9	12 de Octubre	40	11	9	20	46	66	−20	42	
10	3 de Febrero	40	9	9	22	46	67	−21	36	
11	Fernando de la Mora	40	6	6	28	35	83	−48	24	Relegated to second division

=== Relegation / Promotion ===
- Fernando de la Mora automatically relegated to the second division after finishing last in the aggregate points table.
- Sol de América and Sportivo Trinidense promoted to the first division by finishing first and second respectively in the second division tournament.

=== Qualification to international competitions ===
- Libertad qualified to the 2007 Copa Libertadores by winning the Torneo Apertura and the 2007 Copa Sudamericana by winning the national championship.
- Cerro Porteño qualified to the Copa Libertadores 2007 by winning the Torneo Clausura
- Tacuary qualified to the 2007 Copa Libertadores as the best finisher in the aggregate points table and the 2007 Copa Sudamericana by winning the Copa Sudamericana Qualifiers (see below).

==== Copa Sudamericana Qualifiers ====
Semifinals

Team #1	Score	Team #2	Date
2 de Mayo	1-1	Tacuary	December 13
Cerro Porteño	2-0	Sportivo Luqueño	December 13

- Note: Tacuary advanced to the final due to better position in the aggregate points table.

Final

Team #1	Score	Team #2	Date
Tacuary	3-2	Cerro Porteño	December 17
