= Unión Temuco =

Chilean football club

- Full name: Club Deportivo Unión Temuco
- Nickname(s): UT; El Rojo; Matadores
- Founded: January 20, 2008
- Ground: Estadio Municipal Germán Becker; Temuco, Chile
- Capacity: 18,125
- Chairman: Marcelo Salas (last)
- Manager: Luis Landeros (last)
- League: Primera B
- 2013: 5th, South Zone
Home colours	Away colours

Club Deportivo Unión Temuco was a Chilean professional football club based in Temuco, La Araucanía Region. The club played at the Primera B, the second tier of the Chilean football, until 2013 when it was folded. The club was established in January 2008 by former football star Marcelo Salas, who was born in Temuco. In 2009, the club joined to the Third Division tournament, and years later this tournament was won by Temuco, being the first official title of the club.

Their home games were played at the Estadio Municipal Germán Becker. Unión Temuco's main rivalry was with neighbours Deportes Temuco, against whom they contested the Araucanía derby. The main supporters of the club were the fans of Universidad de Chile living in Temuco, because Marcelo Salas (a former symbol of 'La U') owned the team.

== History ==
=== Foundation ===
Product of a disagreement with Provincial Temuco, made that the project of buying this club and establishing a sports complex collapse and derived a new institution that was quickly registered in ChileDeportes, to start setting up a joint-stock company, being Marcelo Salas the owner in January 2008. In August 2009, it was announced that the former goalkeeper of the national team Nelson Tapia was appointed as new sport manager of the club. In the same season, the club was promoted to the second division, and the rivalry with Deportes Temuco was born.

In 2013 the team owner announced that the two Temuco clubs would merge, and the two teams became known together as Deportes Temuco, with Salas as the main investor.

=== Inaugural season ===
During the Tercera División tournament, the team had a squad with many players with experience. Temuco was frequently in the first place of the league table. On Saturday 14 December 2009, with a 2–0 win over Unión Quilpué on goals by Óscar Salinas in the 73rd and 80th minutes, the team achieved its goal of promotion to Primera B.

The club also had a notable performance in the Copa Chile 2009, winning its debut, 5–0, over Deportes Valdivia in the third round. In the Round of 32, Unión Temuco eliminated to the Chilean giant club Universidad Católica, defeating it 2–0 with the goals of Humberto Álvarez and Carlos Galleguillos at Germán Becker Stadium. After this victory, the club qualified for the Round of 16 for play against Provincial Osorno, in when Temuco defeated to Osorno 6–5 on penalties. Now in the quarterfinals, the club lost its unbeaten after of be defeated for Universidad de Concepción on penalties.

=== Primera B (2010-Present) ===
Now in the Second Division, Temuco signed players with more experience, including Jaime Riveros. After many weeks without loss, the club surprisingly was defeated by its rival Deportes Temuco in a 2–0 loss with two goals of Ignacio Oróstegui in his debut for the Copa Chile 2010. However, in the second of the Copa Chile the club achieved a 2–2 draw with the goals by Matías Donoso and Humberto Álvarez, but the club was eliminated for a 4–2 aggregate loss. After of the club was defeated by its rival, a series of bad results made that the club loss his unbeaten. However, in the second leg of the tournament Temuco was runner-up to Deportes Puerto Montt in the Group of the South zone, qualifying to the octagonal playoffs for the promotion to the Primera División. The club nearly qualified to the promotion playoffs, but Curicó Unido defeated to Unión Temuco 6–5 on penalties, finishing in the fifth place of the octagonal.

For the season 2011, Temuco made big signs as Sebastián Pardo and Mauricio Aros, with the objective of promote to the Primera División. Because the good contacts of the owner Marcelo Salas, he achieved to reach an agreement with the directive of Boca Juniors for play a friendly match. In the debut of Temuco for the season 2011, the club draw with Boca's youth team 1–1, the side goal of Temuco was Mauricio Aros after a notable free kick.

== Colours and kit ==
Until the team began to play in the Third Division the club has a red kit, white shorts and black socks and the away kit was completely black. In 2010, a green strip was added for being the color that the city of Temuco has been wearing since 1960. Also the socks were changed to white. Unión Temuco's sponsorship is Entel PCS and the sponsor brand of Temuco was the Italian company Lotto (2008–2010) and in 2011 the club change brand to Mitre. In 2011, because a bad start of season, the club decided change his home kit to his away black kit.

- Home kit: Black kit, black shorts and black socks.
- Away kit: Red kit, white shorts y white socks.

== Honours ==
- Tercera División A: 1

2009

== Seasons played ==
- 4 season in Primera B
- 2 seasons in Tercera División

== See also ==
- Chilean football league system
