= 2007 Copa Libertadores =

48th season of Copa Libertadores

2007 Copa Libertadores de América
2007 Copa Toyota Libertadores de América 2007 Copa Toyota Libertadores da América

Tournament details
- Dates: January 24 - June 20
- Teams: 38 (from 11 associations)

Final positions
- Champions: (Argentina) Boca Juniors (6th title)
- Runners-up: (Brazil) Grêmio

Tournament statistics
- Matches played: 138
- Goals scored: 364 (2.64 per match)
- Top scorer: (Paraguay) Salvador Cabañas (10 goals)

The 2007 Copa Libertadores de América (officially the 2007 Copa Toyota Libertadores de América for sponsorship reasons) was the 48th edition of the Copa Libertadores. It started on January 24, 2007, and finished on June 20, 2007. It was won by Boca Juniors, who earned their 6th Copa Libertadores title. They won the Libertadores with Miguel Angel Russo.

== Qualified teams ==
| Association | Team (berth) | Qualification method |
|---|---|---|
| (Argentina) Argentina; 5 berths | Boca Juniors | 2005 Apertura and 2006 Clausura champion |
| (Argentina) Argentina; 5 berths | Gimnasia y Esgrima | 2005–06 best placed team on aggregate table |
| (Argentina) Argentina; 5 berths | River Plate | 2005–06 2nd best placed team on aggregate table |
| (Argentina) Argentina; 5 berths | Banfield | 2005–06 3rd best placed team on aggregate table |
| (Argentina) Argentina; 5 berths | Vélez Sársfield | 2005–06 4th best placed team on aggregate table |
| (Bolivia) Bolivia; 3 berths | Blooming | 2005–06 Apertura champion |
| (Bolivia) Bolivia; 3 berths | Bolívar | 2005–06 Clausura champion |
| (Bolivia) Bolivia; 3 berths | Real Potosí | 2005–06 Clausura runner-up |
| (Brazil) Brazil; 5 + 1 berths | Internacional | 2006 Copa Libertadores champion |
| (Brazil) Brazil; 5 + 1 berths | Flamengo | 2006 Copa do Brasil champion |
| (Brazil) Brazil; 5 + 1 berths | São Paulo | 2006 Série A champion |
| (Brazil) Brazil; 5 + 1 berths | Grêmio | 2006 Série A 3rd place |
| (Brazil) Brazil; 5 + 1 berths | Santos | 2006 Série A 4th place |
| (Brazil) Brazil; 5 + 1 berths | Paraná | 2006 Série A 5th place |
| (Chile) Chile; 3 berths | Colo-Colo | 2006 Apertura and 2006 Clausura champion |
| (Chile) Chile; 3 berths | Audax Italiano | 2006 Clausura finalist |
| (Chile) Chile; 3 berths | Cobreloa | Best-placed team in the 2006 Clausura classification stage |
| (Colombia) Colombia; 3 berths | Deportivo Pasto | 2006 Apertura champion |
| (Colombia) Colombia; 3 berths | Cúcuta Deportivo | 2006 Clausura champion |
| (Colombia) Colombia; 3 berths | Deportes Tolima | 2006 best placed team on aggregate table |
| (Ecuador) Ecuador; 3 berths | El Nacional | 2006 Seria A champion |
| (Ecuador) Ecuador; 3 berths | Emelec | 2006 Seria A runner-up |
| (Ecuador) Ecuador; 3 berths | LDU Quito | 2006 Seria A 3rd place |
| (Paraguay) Paraguay; 3 berths | Libertad | 2006 Primera División champion |
| (Paraguay) Paraguay; 3 berths | Cerro Porteño | 2006 Primera División runner-up |
| (Paraguay) Paraguay; 3 berths | Tacuary | 2006 best placed team on aggregate table |
| (Peru) Peru; 3 berths | Alianza Lima | 2006 Apertura winner |
| (Peru) Peru; 3 berths | Cienciano | 2006 Clausura winner |
| (Peru) Peru; 3 berths | Sporting Cristal | 2006 best placed team on aggregate table |
| (Uruguay) Uruguay; 3 berths | Nacional | 2005–06 Primera División champion |
| (Uruguay) Uruguay; 3 berths | Defensor Sporting | 2006 Liguilla Pre-Libertadores winner |
| (Uruguay) Uruguay; 3 berths | Danubio | 2006 Liguilla Pre-Libertadores runner-up |
| (Venezuela) Venezuela; 3 berths | Caracas | 2005–06 Primera División champion |
| (Venezuela) Venezuela; 3 berths | Unión Atlético Maracaibo | 2005–06 Primera División runner-up |
| (Venezuela) Venezuela; 3 berths | Deportivo Táchira | 2005–06 best placed team on aggregate table |
| Mexico (CONCACAF); 3 invitees | Toluca | 2005 Apertura champion |
| Mexico (CONCACAF); 3 invitees | Necaxa | 2007 InterLiga winner |
| Mexico (CONCACAF); 3 invitees | América | 2007 InterLiga runner-up |

== First stage ==
| Team 1 | Agg. | Team 2 | 1st leg | 2nd leg |
|---|---|---|---|---|
| Blooming (Bolivia) | 0–6 | (Brazil) Santos | 0–1 | 0–5 |
| Vélez Sársfield (Argentina) | 5–1 | (Uruguay) Danubio | 3–0 | 2–1 |
| Deportivo Táchira (Venezuela) | 1–4 | (Colombia) Deportes Tolima | 1–2 | 0–2 |
| Tacuary (Paraguay) | 1–4 | (Ecuador) LDU Quito | 1–1 | 0–3 |
| Cobreloa (Chile) | 1–3 | (Brazil) Paraná | 0–2 | 1–1 |
| América (Mexico) | 6–2 | (Peru) Sporting Cristal | 5–0 | 1–2 |

== Second stage ==
=== Group 1 ===
| Pos | Team | Pld | W | D | L | GF | GA | GD | Pts |
|---|---|---|---|---|---|---|---|---|---|
| 1 | (Paraguay) Libertad (A) | 6 | 4 | 1 | 1 | 9 | 4 | +5 | 13 |
| 2 | (Mexico) América (A) | 6 | 4 | 0 | 2 | 12 | 10 | +2 | 12 |
| 3 | (Argentina) Banfield | 6 | 3 | 0 | 3 | 8 | 8 | 0 | 9 |
| 4 | (Ecuador) El Nacional | 6 | 0 | 1 | 5 | 4 | 11 | −7 | 1 |

(A) Advanced to the round of 16

=== Group 2 ===
| Pos | Team | Pld | W | D | L | GF | GA | GD | Pts |
|---|---|---|---|---|---|---|---|---|---|
| 1 | (Mexico) Necaxa (A) | 6 | 4 | 0 | 2 | 9 | 7 | +2 | 12 |
| 2 | (Brazil) São Paulo (A) | 6 | 3 | 2 | 1 | 11 | 4 | +7 | 11 |
| 3 | (Chile) Audax Italiano | 6 | 3 | 2 | 1 | 8 | 6 | +2 | 11 |
| 4 | (Peru) Alianza Lima | 6 | 0 | 0 | 6 | 2 | 13 | −11 | 0 |

(A) Advanced to the round of 16

=== Group 3 ===
| Pos | Team | Pld | W | D | L | GF | GA | GD | Pts |
|---|---|---|---|---|---|---|---|---|---|
| 1 | (Brazil) Grêmio (A) | 6 | 3 | 1 | 2 | 4 | 4 | 0 | 10 |
| 2 | (Colombia) Cúcuta Deportivo (A) | 6 | 2 | 3 | 1 | 9 | 7 | +2 | 9 |
| 3 | (Colombia) Deportes Tolima | 6 | 2 | 1 | 3 | 5 | 6 | −1 | 7 |
| 4 | (Paraguay) Cerro Porteño | 6 | 2 | 1 | 3 | 4 | 5 | −1 | 7 |

(A) Advanced to the round of 16

=== Group 4 ===
| Pos | Team | Pld | W | D | L | GF | GA | GD | Pts |
|---|---|---|---|---|---|---|---|---|---|
| 1 | (Argentina) Vélez Sársfield (A) | 6 | 3 | 2 | 1 | 6 | 3 | +3 | 11 |
| 2 | (Uruguay) Nacional (A) | 6 | 3 | 1 | 2 | 9 | 5 | +4 | 10 |
| 3 | (Brazil) Internacional | 6 | 3 | 1 | 2 | 7 | 7 | 0 | 10 |
| 4 | (Ecuador) Emelec | 6 | 1 | 0 | 5 | 3 | 10 | −7 | 3 |

(A) Advanced to the round of 16

=== Group 5 ===
| Pos | Team | Pld | W | D | L | GF | GA | GD | Pts |
|---|---|---|---|---|---|---|---|---|---|
| 1 | (Brazil) Flamengo (A) | 6 | 5 | 1 | 0 | 10 | 4 | +6 | 16 |
| 2 | (Brazil) Paraná (A) | 6 | 3 | 0 | 3 | 9 | 8 | +1 | 9 |
| 3 | (Bolivia) Real Potosí | 6 | 1 | 3 | 2 | 8 | 9 | −1 | 6 |
| 4 | (Venezuela) Unión Atlético Maracaibo | 6 | 0 | 2 | 4 | 8 | 14 | −6 | 2 |

(A) Advanced to the round of 16

=== Group 6 ===
| Pos | Team | Pld | W | D | L | GF | GA | GD | Pts |
|---|---|---|---|---|---|---|---|---|---|
| 1 | (Chile) Colo-Colo (A) | 6 | 3 | 0 | 3 | 12 | 7 | +5 | 9 |
| 2 | (Venezuela) Caracas (A) | 6 | 3 | 0 | 3 | 7 | 10 | −3 | 9 |
| 3 | (Ecuador) LDU Quito | 6 | 2 | 2 | 2 | 7 | 8 | −1 | 8 |
| 4 | (Argentina) River Plate | 6 | 2 | 2 | 2 | 5 | 6 | −1 | 8 |

(A) Advanced to the round of 16

=== Group 7 ===
| Pos | Team | Pld | W | D | L | GF | GA | GD | Pts |
|---|---|---|---|---|---|---|---|---|---|
| 1 | (Mexico) Toluca (A) | 6 | 4 | 0 | 2 | 10 | 6 | +4 | 12 |
| 2 | (Argentina) Boca Juniors (A) | 6 | 3 | 1 | 2 | 11 | 5 | +6 | 10 |
| 3 | (Peru) Cienciano | 6 | 3 | 0 | 3 | 12 | 9 | +3 | 9 |
| 4 | (Bolivia) Bolívar | 6 | 1 | 1 | 4 | 5 | 18 | −13 | 4 |

(A) Advanced to the round of 16

=== Group 8 ===
| Pos | Team | Pld | W | D | L | GF | GA | GD | Pts |
|---|---|---|---|---|---|---|---|---|---|
| 1 | (Brazil) Santos (A) | 6 | 6 | 0 | 0 | 12 | 1 | +11 | 18 |
| 2 | (Uruguay) Defensor Sporting (A) | 6 | 3 | 0 | 3 | 8 | 7 | +1 | 9 |
| 3 | (Argentina) Gimnasia y Esgrima | 6 | 3 | 0 | 3 | 9 | 10 | −1 | 9 |
| 4 | (Colombia) Deportivo Pasto | 6 | 0 | 0 | 6 | 3 | 14 | −11 | 0 |

(A) Advanced to the round of 16

== Knockout stages ==
The teams were seeded 1 to 8 (first placed teams of each group) and 9 to 16 (second placed teams of each group); the best seeds played the worst seeds. To prevent a final with two teams from the same country, CONMEBOL paired Santos with Grêmio and Boca Juniors with Cúcuta Deportivo in the semifinals.

=== Seeding ===
Teams qualified as a group winner
| Seed | Team | Pts | GD | GF | AG |
|---|---|---|---|---|---|
| 1 | (Brazil) Santos | 18 | +11 | 12 | 5 |
| 2 | (Brazil) Flamengo | 16 | +6 | 10 | 5 |
| 3 | (Paraguay) Libertad | 13 | +5 | 12 | 6 |
| 4 | (Mexico) Toluca | 12 | +4 | 10 | 4 |
| 5 | (Mexico) Necaxa | 12 | +2 | 9 | 3 |
| 6 | (Argentina) Vélez Sársfield | 11 | +3 | 6 | 1 |
| 7 | (Brazil) Grêmio | 10 | 0 | 4 | 2 |
| 8 | (Chile) Colo-Colo | 9 | +5 | 12 | 5 |

Teams qualified as a runner-up
| Seed | Team | Pts | GD | GF | AG |
|---|---|---|---|---|---|
| 9 | (Mexico) América | 12 | +2 | 12 | 5 |
| 10 | (Brazil) São Paulo | 11 | +7 | 11 | 2 |
| 11 | (Argentina) Boca Juniors | 10 | +6 | 11 | 0 |
| 12 | (Uruguay) Nacional | 10 | +4 | 9 | 1 |
| 13 | (Colombia) Cúcuta Deportivo | 9 | +2 | 9 | 5 |
| 14 | (Brazil) Paraná | 9 | +1 | 9 | 5 |
| 15 | (Uruguay) Defensor Sporting | 9 | +1 | 8 | 2 |
| 16 | (Venezuela) Caracas | 9 | −3 | 7 | 3 |

=== Bracket ===
Round of 16
1 | (Brazil) Santos | 2 | 3
16 | (Venezuela) Caracas | 2 | 2
8 | (Chile) Colo-Colo | 0 | 2
9 | (Mexico) América | 3 | 1
7 | (Brazil) Grêmio | 0 | 2
10 | (Brazil) São Paulo | 1 | 0
2 | (Brazil) Flamengo | 0 | 2
15 | (Uruguay) Defensor Sporting | 3 | 0
3 | (Paraguay) Libertad | 2 | 1
14 | (Brazil) Paraná | 1 | 1
6 | (Argentina) Vélez Sarsfield | 0 | 3
11 | (Argentina) Boca Juniors | 3 | 1
5 | (Mexico) Necaxa | 2 | 0
12 | (Uruguay) Nacional | 3 | 1
4 | (Mexico) Toluca | 1 | 2
13 | (Colombia) Cúcuta Deportivo | 5 | 0

Quarterfinals
1 | (Brazil) Santos | 0 | 2
9 | (Mexico) América | 0 | 1
7 | (Brazil) Grêmio | 0 | 2 (4)
15 | (Uruguay) Defensor Sporting | 2 | 0 (2)
3 | (Paraguay) Libertad | 1 | 0
11 | (Argentina) Boca Juniors | 1 | 2
12 | (Uruguay) Nacional | 0 | 2
13 | (Colombia) Cúcuta Deportivo | 2 | 2

Semifinals
1 | (Brazil) Santos | 0 | 3
7 | (Brazil) Grêmio (a) | 2 | 1
11 | (Argentina) Boca Juniors | 1 | 3
13 | (Colombia) Cúcuta Deportivo | 3 | 0

Finals
7 | (Brazil) Grêmio | 0 | 0
11 | (Argentina) Boca Juniors | 3 | 2

=== Finals ===
June 13, 2007
21:45 (UTC-3)

| Boca Juniors (Argentina) | 3–0 | (Brazil) Grêmio |
|---|---|---|
| Palacio 18'; Riquelme 73'; Patrício 89' (o.g.) | (Report) |

Estadio Alberto J. Armando (La Bombonera), Buenos Aires
Attendance: 50,993
Referee: Jorge Larrionda (Uruguay)

June 20, 2007
21:45 (UTC-3)

| Grêmio (Brazil) | 0–2 | (Argentina) Boca Juniors |
|---|---|---|
| | (Report) | Riquelme 69', 81' |

Estádio Olímpico Monumental, Porto Alegre
Attendance: 51,851
Referee: Óscar Ruiz (Colombia)

== Top goalscorers ==
| Pos | Name | Team | Goals |
|---|---|---|---|
| 1 | (Paraguay) Salvador Cabañas | (Mexico) América | 10 |
| 2 | (Panama) Blas Pérez | (Colombia) Cúcuta Deportivo | 8 |
| 2 | (Argentina) Juan Román Riquelme | (Argentina) Boca Juniors | 8 |
| 4 | (Brazil) Zé Roberto | (Brazil) Santos | 7 |
| 5 | (Brazil) Renato | (Brazil) Flamengo | 5 |
| 5 | (Chile) Humberto Suazo | (Chile) Colo-Colo | 5 |
| 7 | (Argentina) Damián Escudero | (Argentina) Vélez Sársfield | 4 |
| 7 | (Argentina) Juan Manuel Martínez | (Colombia) Cúcuta Deportivo | 4 |
| 7 | (Brazil) Carlos Eduardo Monteiro | (Bolivia) Real Potosí | 4 |
| 7 | (Chile) Rodolfo Moya | (Chile) Audax Italiano | 4 |
| 7 | (Argentina) Rodrigo Palacio | (Argentina) Boca Juniors | 4 |
| 7 | (Argentina) Martín Palermo | (Argentina) Boca Juniors | 4 |
| 7 | (Brazil) Kléber Pereira | (Mexico) Necaxa | 4 |
| 7 | (Uruguay) Juan Manuel Salgueiro | (Mexico) Necaxa | 4 |
| 7 | (Uruguay) Vicente Sánchez | (Mexico) Toluca | 4 |
| 7 | (Uruguay) Diego Vera | (Uruguay) Nacional | 4 |

== See also ==
- 2007 FIFA Club World Cup
- 2008 Recopa Sudamericana
