= Unión Quilpué =

Chilean football club

- Full name: Club Deportivo Unión Quilpué
- Nickname: Quilpueínos
- Founded: February 14, 2002
- Ground: Municipal Villa Olímpica; Quilpué, Chile
- Capacity: 2,694
- Chairman: Enrique Montes Valverde
- Manager: Wilson Castillo V.
- League: Liga Chilena de Fútbol: Tercera División
- 2007: 4th (Grupo Centro)
Home colours	Away colours

Unión Quilpué are a Chilean football club based in the city of Quilpué. The club was founded February 14, 2002, and plays in Tercera división.
