= Provincial Talagante =

Chilean football club

- Full name: Club Deportivo y Social Provincial Talagante
- Nicknames: Brujos Rojos, Brujos, Talagantinos
- Founded: February 03, 2006
- Stadium: Estadio Municipal Lucas Pacheco Toro; Talagante; Chile
- Capacity: 2,883
- Chairman: Pablo Barrera Davila
- Coach: Esteban Pino Tello
- League: Tercera División B
- 2026: Campeón zona norte
Home colours

Club Deportivo y Social Provincial Talagante is a Chilean Football club, their home town is Talagante, Chile. They currently play in the fifrth level of Chilean football, the Tercera División b.

The club were founded on February 03, 2006 with the aim of representing entire Talagante Province. The communes within this province are: Talagante, El Monte, Peñaflor, Isla de Maipo y Padre Hurtado.

The club has participated in Tercera A (Chile) for 10 years and this tournament marks its 10th season in Tercera B (Chile). Since its relegation in 2017, this year marks its 9 consecutive year in Tercera Division B de Chile.

== Coaches ==
2006-09: Luis Abarca junto a Patricio Maibee

2010: Patricio Maibee

2011-12: Hernán Peña Gonzalez

2013-16: Patricio Maibee

2017-19: Cristian Mora Tejo

2021-22: Orlando Amigo Cádiz

2022-Act: Esteban Pino Tello

== Team 2026 ==
- Actually 10/April/2026

Note: Flags indicate national team as defined under FIFA eligibility rules; some limited exceptions apply. Players may hold more than one non-FIFA nationality.

No.	Pos.	Nation	Player
1	GK	CHI	Gabriel Duran Bravo
12	GK	CHI	Cristobal Huerta
25	GK	CHI	Francisco Briceño
2	DF	CHI	Lucas Valenzuela
4	DF	CHI	David Nuñez Vasquez
17	DF	CHI	Matias Alfaro
18	DF	CHI	Cristofer Fuenzalida
23	DF	CHI	Javier Lillo
24	DF	CHI	Daniel Nuñez
29	DF	CHI	Javier Monsalve
5	MF	CHI	Lucas Rojas
6	MF	CHI	Diego Parra Martinez
8	MF	CHI	Benjamin Vidal
14	MF	CHI	Pablo Castillo
15	MF	CHI	Sebastian Andrade Campos
16	MF	CHI	Tomas Carmona
20	MF	CHI	Camilo Rojas
7	FW	CHI	Eduardo Peñailillo
9	FW	CHI	Dylan Berríos
10	FW	CHI	Paolo Peralta
11	FW	CHI	Johan Diaz
19	FW	CHI	Juan Pablo Berrocal
21	FW	CHI	Juan Diaz García
27	FW	CHI	Felipe Figueroa

== Seasons played ==
- Seasons in Tercera División: 10 (2006-08,2010-16)
- Season in Tercera B (Chile): 10 (2009,2017-19,2021-Actualidad)
- Shares in Copa Chile: 5 (2008-09, 2009, 2010, 2011, 2012-13)

== See also ==
- Chilean football league system
