= 2007 Liga Deportiva Universitaria de Quito season =

LDU Quito
2007 season
- President: Carlos Arroyo
- Manager: Edgardo Bauza
- Stadium: Estadio Casa Blanca
- Serie A: Champions (9th title)
- Copa Libertadores: Second Stage
- Top goalscorer: League: Luis Escalada; Christian Lara (16 goals); All: Luis Escalada; Christian Lara (16 goals)
Home colours	Away colours	Third colours

Liga Deportiva Universitaria de Quito's 2007 season was the club's 77th year of existence, the 54th year in professional football, and the 46th in the top level of professional football in Ecuador.

== Club ==
Coaching staff

Manager: Edgardo Bauza
Assistant manager: José Daniel Di Leo
Physical trainer: Bruno Militano
Goalkeeper trainer: Óscar Manis

Kits
Supplier: Umbro
Sponsor(s): Movistar, Coca-Cola, Pilsener

== Squad ==
No.	Pos.	Nation	Player
—	GK	ECU	Alexander Domínguez
—	GK	ECU	Cristian Mora
—	GK	ECU	Luis Preti
—	DF	ARG	Norberto Araujo
—	DF	ECU	Arlín Ayoví
—	DF	ECU	Christian Balseca
—	DF	ECU	Diego Calderón
—	DF	ECU	Renán Calle
—	DF	ECU	Jayro Campos
—	DF	ECU	Gabriel Espinosa
—	DF	ECU	Santiago Jácome
—	DF	ECU	Luis Ortíz
—	DF	ECU	Diego Paredes
—	MF	ECU	Paúl Ambrosi
—	MF	ECU	Luis Bolaños
—	MF	ECU	Víctor Chalá
—	MF	ECU	Israel Chango
—	MF	ECU	Christian Lara

No.	Pos.	Nation	Player
—	MF	ECU	Pedro Larrea
—	MF	ARG	Damián Manso
—	MF	ECU	Willian Nazareno
—	MF	ECU	Alfonso Obregón (captain)
—	MF	ECU	Ángel Pután
—	MF	ECU	Edwin Tenorio
—	MF	ECU	Patricio Urrutia
—	MF	PAR	Enrique Vera
—	FW	ECU	Orlindo Ayoví
—	FW	ECU	Byron Cano
—	FW	ECU	Agustín Delgado
—	FW	ARG	Luis Miguel Escalada
—	FW	ECU	Víctor Estupiñán
—	FW	ECU	Joffre Guerrón
—	FW	ECU	Franklin Salas
—	FW	ECU	Ángel Vargas
—	FW	ARG	José Vizcarra

== Competitions ==
Competition	Started round	Final position / round	First match	Last match
Serie A	First Stage	Champion	Feb 10	Dec 16
Copa Libertadores	First Stage	Second Stage	Feb 1	Apr 25

=== Serie A ===
==== First stage ====
2007 was the club's 46th season in the top-flight national tournament. The first stage was played between February 1, 2007 and June 13, 2007.

Pos	Team	Pld	W	D	L	GF	GA	GD	Pts	Qualification
1	Olmedo	18	11	4	3	27	15	+12	37	2007 Copa Sudamericana Preliminary Round & Liguilla Final
2	Deportivo Cuenca	18	10	2	6	26	19	+7	32	Qualified to the Liguilla Final
3	LDU Quito	18	8	4	6	36	26	+10	28	Qualified to the Liguilla Final
4	Deportivo Azogues	18	8	4	6	26	26	0	28	
5	El Nacional	18	8	3	7	37	27	+10	27	

Updated to match(es) played on June 13, 2007. Source: 2007 First Stage Table
Rules for classification: 1) points; 2) goal difference; 3) number of goals scored.

Overall								Home						Away					
Pld	W	D	L	GF	GA	GD	Pts	W	D	L	GF	GA	GD	W	D	L	GF	GA	GD
18	8	4	6	36	26	+10	28	6	2	1	20	10	+10	2	2	5	16	16	0

February 10 Round 1	Deportivo Cuenca	0–0	LDU Quito	Cuenca
				Stadium: Estadio Alejandro Serrano Aguilar

February 14 Round 2	LDU Quito	2–1	Barcelona	Quito
	Lara 29'; A. Ayoví 54'		Vera 47'	Stadium: Estadio Casa Blanca

February 18 Round 3	LDU Quito	1–1	Deportivo Quito	Quito
	Guerrón 19'		Hidalgo 46'	Stadium: Estadio Casa Blanca

February 25 Round 4	Emelec	4–3	LDU Quito	Guayaquil
	Rodríguez 23'; Quiñónez 45+2'; Ladines 70'; Ayoví 85'		Salas 67'; Ambrosi 87'; Escalada 88'	Stadium: Estadio George Capwell

March 3 Round 5	LDU Quito	2–1	Macará	Quito
	Escalada 36'; Guerrón 86'		Garcés 73'	Stadium: Estadio Casa Blanca

March 10 Round 6	Deportivo Azogues	2–1	LDU Quito	Azogues
	Valencia 6'; Polo 11'		Lara 27'	Stadium: Estadio Jorge Andrade

March 18 Round 7	LDU Quito	4–1	Imbabura	Quito
	Bolaños 41'; Guerrón 63'; Lara 68'; Salas 83'		Gómez 2'	Stadium: Estadio Casa Blanca

April 8 Round 9	LDU Quito	3–3	El Nacional	Quito
	O. Ayoví 45'; Lara 63'; Bolaños 81'		Benítez 20'; Quiroz 89'; Ordóñez 90+2'	Stadium: Estadio Casa Blanca

April 13 Round 10	El Nacional	3–1	LDU Quito	Quito
	Kaviedes 26', 55' (pen.); Ordóñez 78'		Salas 1'	Stadium: Estadio Olímpico Atahualpa

April 18 Round 8	Olmedo	1–0	LDU Quito	Riobamba
	Caicedo 45'			Stadium: Estadio Olímpico de Riobamba

April 22 Round 11	LDU Quito	1–3	Olmedo	Quito
	Salas 71'		Torales 13'; Cheme 45'; Galván 86'	Stadium: Estadio Casa Blanca

April 29 Round 12	Imbabura	1–6	LDU Quito	Ibarra
	Neculmán 76' (pen.)		Vera 9'; Salas 12', 64'; Bolaños 19'; Escalada 42', 70'	Stadium: Estadio Olímpico de Ibarra

May 6 Round 13	LDU Quito	2–0	Deportivo Azogues	Quito
	Calle 3'; Urrutia 82' (pen.)			Stadium: Estadio Casa Blanca

May 12 Round 14	Macará	1–2	LDU Quito	Ambato
	Garcés 59'		Salas 50'; Escalada 71'	Stadium: Estadio Bellavista

May 20 Round 15	LDU Quito	1–0	Emelec	Quito
	O. Ayoví 71'			Stadium: Estadio Casa Blanca

May 27 Round 16	Deportivo Quito	2–2	LDU Quito	Quito
	Campos 23' (o.g.); Palacios 71'		Calle 62'; Salas 87'	Stadium: Estadio Olímpico Atahualpa

June 10 Round 17	Barcelona	2–1	LDU Quito	Guayaquil
	Vera 20'; M. Ayoví 89'		Bolaños 79'	Stadium: Estadio Monumental Banco Pichincha

June 13 Round 18	LDU Quito	4–0	Deportivo Cuenca	Quito
	Guerrón 33', 73'; Lara 49'; Escalada 63' (pen.)			Stadium: Estadio Casa Blanca

==== Second stage ====
The second stage was played between July 15, 2007, and October 7, 2007.

Pos	Team	Pld	W	D	L	GF	GA	GD	Pts	Qualification
1	LDU Quito	18	10	3	5	28	11	+17	33	2008 Copa Sudamericana First Stage & Liguilla Final
2	El Nacional	18	9	5	4	24	18	+6	32	Qualified to the Liguilla Final
3	Deportivo Quito	18	9	2	7	22	15	+7	29	Qualified to the Liguilla Final
4	Emelec	18	8	2	8	23	21	+2	26	
5	Deportivo Azogues	18	7	3	8	20	25	−5	24	

Updated to match(es) played on October 7, 2007. Source: 2007 Second Stage Table
Rules for classification: 1) points; 2) goal difference; 3) number of goals scored.

Overall								Home						Away					
Pld	W	D	L	GF	GA	GD	Pts	W	D	L	GF	GA	GD	W	D	L	GF	GA	GD
18	10	3	5	28	11	+17	33	7	1	1	18	3	+15	3	2	4	10	8	+2

July 15 Round 1	Olmedo	1–0	LDU Quito	Riobamba
	Cheme 5'			Stadium: Estadio Olímpico de Riobamba

July 18 Round 2	LDU Quito	2–1	Deportivo Cuenca	Quito
	Bolaños 47'; Escalada 90'		Ferreyra 35'	Stadium: Estadio Casa Blanca

July 22 Round 3	Deportivo Quito	1–0	LDU Quito	Quito
	Vaca 69'			Stadium: Estadio Olímpico Atahualpa

July 25 Round 4	LDU Quito	2–1	El Nacional	Quito
	Vaca 21'; Lara 56'		Ordóñez 12'	Stadium: Estadio Casa Blanca

July 29 Round 5	LDU Quito	2–0	Barcelona	Quito
	Escalada 2'; Lara 60'			Stadium: Estadio Casa Blanca

August 4 Round 6	Macará	1–3	LDU Quito	Ambato
	Escobar 89' (pen.)		Escalada 49'; Lara 77', 90+1'	Stadium: Estadio Bellavista

August 11 Round 7	LDU Quito	0–1	Deportivo Azogues	Quito
			Bran 40'	Stadium: Estadio Casa Blanca

August 15 Round 8	Imbabura	2–1	LDU Quito	Ibarra
	Andrade 56'; Neculmán 67'		Lara 48'	Stadium: Estadio Olímpico de Ibarra

August 19 Round 9	LDU Quito	3–0	Emelec	Quito
	Delgado 21'; Lara 51'; Escalada 53'			Stadium: Estadio Casa Blanca

August 26 Round 10	Emelec	2–0	LDU Quito	Guayaquil
	Ladines 15'; Juárez 54'			Stadium: Estadio George Capwell

August 29 Round 11	LDU Quito	5–0	Imbabura	Quito
	Escalada 1', 18', 80'; Lara 20'; Delgado 83'			Stadium: Estadio Casa Blanca

September 2 Round 12	Deportivo Azogues	1–1	LDU Quito	Azogues
	Moreira 28'		Bolaños 10'	Stadium: Estadio Jorge Andrade

September 16 Round 13	LDU Quito	2–0	Macará	Quito
	Lara 50'; Delgado 87'			Stadium: Estadio Casa Blanca

September 23 Round 14	Barcelona	0–3	LDU Quito	Guayaquil
			Escalada 45+1'; Lara 61', 81'	Stadium: Estadio Modelo Alberto Spencer Herrera

September 26 Round 15	El Nacional	0–2	LDU Quito	Quito
			Guerrón 24'; Chango 36'	Stadium: Estadio Olímpico Atahualpa

September 29 Round 16	LDU Quito	2–0	Deportivo Quito	Quito
	Lara 44'; Escalada 46'			Stadium: Estadio Casa Blanca

October 3 Round 17	Deportivo Cuenca	0–0	LDU Quito	Cuenca
				Stadium: Estadio Alejandro Serrano Aguilar

October 7 Round 18	LDU Quito	0–0	Olmedo	Quito
				Stadium: Estadio Casa Blanca

==== Liguilla Final ====
The Liguilla Final was played between October 21, 2007 and December 16, 2007.

Pos	Team	Pld	W	D	L	GF	GA	GD	BP	Pts	Qualification
1	LDU Quito	10	7	2	1	13	4	+9	4	27	2008 Copa Libertadores Second Stage
2	Deportivo Cuenca	10	4	6	0	12	5	+7	2	20	2008 Copa Libertadores Second Stage
3	Olmedo	10	4	4	2	9	5	+4	3	19	2008 Copa Libertadores First Stage
4	Deportivo Azogues	10	4	2	4	8	8	0	0	14	
5	El Nacional	10	1	3	6	10	18	−8	2	8	

Updated to match(es) played on December 16, 2007. Source: 2007 Liguilla Final Table
Rules for classification: 1) points; 2) goal difference; 3) number of goals scored. Includes Bonus Points earned from the previous rounds.

Overall								Home						Away					
Pld	W	D	L	GF	GA	GD	Pts	W	D	L	GF	GA	GD	W	D	L	GF	GA	GD
10	7	2	1	13	4	+9	27	4	1	0	7	1	+6	3	1	1	6	3	+3

October 21 Round 1	LDU Quito	1–0	Olmedo	Quito
	Delgado 52'			Stadium: Estadio Casa Blanca

October 28 Round 2	Deportivo Quito	1–3	LDU Quito	Quito
	Triviño 27'		Campos 47'; Urrutia 61'; Delgado 67'	Stadium: Estadio Olímpico Atahualpa

October 31 Round 3	El Nacional	0–2	LDU Quito	Quito
			Vera 83'; Guerrón 90'	Stadium: Estadio Olímpico Atahualpa

November 4 Round 4	LDU Quito	1–1	Deportivo Cuenca	Quito
	Delgado 66'		Castillo 7' (pen.)	Stadium: Estadio Casa Blanca

November 10 Round 5	Deportivo Azogues	0–1	LDU Quito	Azogues
			Bolaños 66'	Stadium: Estadio Jorge Andrade

November 25 Round 6	LDU Quito	2–0	Deportivo Azogues	Quito
	Calle 53'; Urrutia 88' (pen.)			Stadium: Estadio Casa Blanca

November 30 Round 7	Deportivo Cuenca	0–0	LDU Quito	Cuenca
				Stadium: Estadio Alejandro Serrano Aguilar

December 5 Round 8	LDU Quito	2–0	El Nacional	Quito
	Bolaños 45+1'; Urrutia 51' (pen.)			Stadium: Estadio Casa Blanca

December 9 Round 9	LDU Quito	1–0	Deportivo Quito	Quito
	Escalada 49'			Stadium: Estadio Casa Blanca

December 16 Round 10	Olmedo	2–0	LDU Quito	Riobamba
	Jácome 38' (o.g.); Galván 87' (pen.)			Stadium: Estadio Olímpico de Riobamba

=== Copa Libertadores ===
==== Copa Libertadores Squad ====
No.	Pos.	Nation	Player
1	GK	ECU	Luis Preti
2	DF	ARG	Norberto Araujo
3	DF	ECU	Santiago Jácome
4	MF	ECU	Paúl Ambrosi
5	MF	ECU	Alfonso Obregón (captain)
6	MF	ECU	Arlín Ayoví
7	FW	ARG	José Vizcarra
8	MF	ECU	Patricio Urrutia
9	FW	ARG	Luis Miguel Escalada
10	MF	ECU	Christian Lara
11	FW	ECU	Franklin Salas
12	GK	ECU	Cristian Mora

No.	Pos.	Nation	Player
13	MF	ECU	Pedro Larrea
14	MF	ECU	Víctor Chalá
15	MF	ECU	Luis Ortíz
16	DF	ECU	Diego Calderón
17	FW	ECU	Jhonatan Monar
18	FW	ECU	Orlindo Ayoví
19	FW	ECU	Joffre Guerrón
20	MF	PAR	Enrique Vera
21	MF	ECU	Luis Bolaños
22	GK	ECU	Alexander Domínguez
23	DF	ECU	Jayro Campos
24	FW	ECU	Ángel Pután

Overall								Home						Away					
Pld	W	D	L	GF	GA	GD	Pts	W	D	L	GF	GA	GD	W	D	L	GF	GA	GD
8	3	3	2	11	9	+2	12	3	1	0	10	3	+7	0	2	2	1	6	−5

==== First stage ====
February 1 First Stage	Tacuary (Paraguay)	1–1	(Ecuador) LDU Quito	Asunción, Paraguay
20:30 UTC−03:00	Villalba 38'	Report	Urrutia 64'	Stadium: Estadio Defensores del Chaco; Attendance: 1,316; Referee: Sálvio Fagundes (Brazil)

February 6 First Stage	LDU Quito (Ecuador)	3–0	(Paraguay) Tacuary	Quito, Ecuador
20:45 UTC−05:00	Guerrón 24'; Samudio 54' (o.g.); Ambrosi 70'	Report		Stadium: Estadio Casa Blanca; Attendance: 11,686; Referee: Martín Vázquez (Uruguay)

LDU Quito advanced on points 4–1.

==== Second stage ====
Pos	Team	Pld	W	D	L	GF	GA	GD	Pts
1	(Chile) Colo-Colo (A)	6	3	0	3	12	7	+5	9
2	(Venezuela) Caracas (A)	6	3	0	3	7	10	−3	9
3	(Ecuador) LDU Quito	6	2	2	2	7	8	−1	8
4	(Argentina) River Plate	6	2	2	2	5	6	−1	8

Source: RSSSF
(A) Advanced to the round of 16

February 22 Second Stage	Caracas FC (Venezuela)	1–0	(Ecuador) LDU Quito	Caracas, Venezuela
17:45 UTC−04:30	Guerra 75'	Report		Stadium: Estadio Brígido Iriarte; Referee: Víctor Carrillo (Peru)

March 7 Second Stage	LDU Quito (Ecuador)	3–1	(Chile) Colo-Colo	Quito, Ecuador
17:00 UTC−05:00	Obregón 46'; Salas 74' (pen.); Guerrón 85'	Report	Suazo 32'	Stadium: Estadio Casa Blanca; Referee: Albert Duarte (Colombia)

March 15 Second Stage	LDU Quito (Ecuador)	1–1	(Argentina) River Plate	Quito, Ecuador
17:15 UTC−05:00	Vera 15'	Report	Farías 54'	Stadium: Estadio Casa Blanca; Referee: Carlos Chandía (Chile)

March 29 Second Stage	River Plate (Argentina)	0–0	(Ecuador) LDU Quito	Buenos Aires, Argentina
21:00 UTC−03:00		Report		Stadium: Estadio Monumental Antonio Vespucio Liberti; Attendance: 15,707; Referee: Carlos Eugênio Simon (Brazil)

April 3 Second Stage	Colo-Colo (Chile)	4–0	(Ecuador) LDU Quito	Santiago, Chile
20:15 UTC−03:00	Fierro 50' (pen.), 72'; Suazo 65'; Millar 78'	Report		Stadium: Estadio Monumental; Referee: Roberto Silvera (Uruguay)

April 25 Second Stage	LDU Quito (Ecuador)	3–1	(Venezuela) Caracas FC	Quito, Ecuador
17:30 UTC−05:00	Ayoví 23'; Campos 40'; Guerrón 55'	Report	González 63'	Stadium: Estadio Casa Blanca; Referee: Georges Buckley (Peru)
