= 2006 Liga Deportiva Universitaria de Quito season =

LDU Quito
2006 season
- President: Esteban Santos
- Manager: Juan Carlos Oblitas (until July 23); Edgardo Bauza (from August 6)
- Stadium: Estadio Casa Blanca
- Serie A: 3rd
- Copa Libertadores: Quarterfinals
- Copa Sudamericana: First Stage
- Top goalscorer: League: Agustín Delgado (12 goals); All: Agustín Delgado (18 goals)
Home colours	Away colours	Third colours

Liga Deportiva Universitaria de Quito's 2006 season was the club's 76th year of existence, the 53rd year in professional football, and the 45th in the top level of professional football in Ecuador.

== Kits ==
Supplier: Umbro
Sponsor(s): Movistar, Coca-Cola, Pilsener

== Squad ==
No.	Pos.	Nation	Player
—	GK	ECU	Sandro Borja
—	GK	ECU	Alexander Domínguez
—	GK	ECU	Cristian Mora
—	GK	ECU	Luis Preti
—	DF	ECU	Christian Balseca
—	DF	ECU	Jayro Campos
—	DF	PAR	Carlos Espínola
—	DF	ECU	Giovanny Espinoza
—	DF	ECU	Juan Guerrón
—	DF	ECU	Santiago Jácome
—	DF	ECU	Diego Paredes
—	DF	ECU	Néicer Reasco
—	MF	ECU	Paúl Ambrosi
—	MF	ECU	Moisés Candelario
—	MF	ECU	Víctor Chalá
—	MF	ECU	Israel Chango
—	MF	VEN	Héctor González
—	MF	ECU	Walter Iza
—	MF	ECU	Pedro Larrea

No.	Pos.	Nation	Player
—	MF	ECU	Édison Méndez
—	MF	ECU	Jonathan Monar
—	MF	COL	Elkin Murillo
—	MF	ECU	Alfonso Obregón (captain)
—	MF	PER	Roberto Palacios
—	MF	ECU	Paúl Plaza
—	MF	ECU	Ángel Pután
—	MF	ECU	Patricio Urrutia
—	MF	ECU	Danny Vaca
—	MF	PAR	Enrique Vera
—	MF	ECU	Jonathan Villalba
—	FW	ARG	Diego Ceballos
—	FW	ECU	Agustín Delgado
—	FW	ECU	Víctor Estupiñán
—	FW	ARG	Ariel Graziani
—	FW	ECU	Joffre Guerrón
—	FW	ECU	Franklin Salas
—	FW	ECU	Ángel Vargas

== Competitions ==
=== Serie A ===
==== First stage ====
Pos	Team	Pld	W	D	L	GF	GA	GD	Pts	Qualification or relegation
1	LDU Quito	18	11	3	4	37	24	+13	36	2006 Copa Sudamericana Preliminary Round & the Liguilla Final
2	El Nacional	18	9	4	5	35	26	+9	31	Qualified to the Liguilla Final
3	Olmedo	18	9	2	7	19	21	−2	29	Qualified to the Liguilla Final
4	Emelec	18	8	4	6	30	21	+9	28	
5	Deportivo Quito	18	7	4	7	22	23	−1	25	
6	Barcelona	18	8	0	10	26	24	+2	24	
7	Aucas	18	6	4	8	25	35	−10	22	
8	Deportivo Cuenca	18	7	0	11	18	26	−8	21	
9	Macará	18	6	3	9	17	28	−11	21	
10	ESPOLI	18	4	6	8	31	32	−1	18	Relegation to Serie B

Source: RSSSF
Rules for classification: 1) points; 2) goal difference; 3) number of goals scored.

===== Results =====
Home \ Away	SDA	BSC	CDC	SDQ	EN	CSE	CDE	LDU	MAC	CDO
Aucas								0–2		
Barcelona								1–0		
Deportivo Cuenca								1–3		
Deportivo Quito								1–2		
El Nacional								2–2		
Emelec								1–1		
ESPOLI								2–2		
LDU Quito	4–2	2–1	1–2	3–2	3–2	3–1	3–2		3–2	3–0
Macará								1–0		
Olmedo								1–0		

Source: RSSSF
Legend: Blue = home team win; Yellow = draw; Red = away team win.

==== Second stage ====
Pos	Team	Pld	W	D	L	GF	GA	GD	Pts	Qualification or relegation
1	El Nacional	18	8	7	3	31	16	+15	31	2007 Copa Sudamericana Preliminary Round & the Liguilla Final
2	Emelec	18	8	7	3	29	21	+8	31	Qualified to the Liguilla Final
3	Barcelona	18	9	4	5	27	20	+7	31	Qualified to the Liguilla Final
4	Olmedo	18	8	7	3	24	18	+6	31	
5	Deportivo Quito	18	6	4	8	21	25	−4	22	
6	LDU Quito	18	6	3	9	21	32	−11	21	
7	Deportivo Cuenca	18	4	8	6	16	14	+2	20	
8	Macará	18	5	5	8	28	29	−1	20	
9	Deportivo Azogues	18	5	4	9	16	28	−12	19	
10	Aucas	18	5	3	10	23	35	−12	18	Relegation to Serie B

Source: RSSSF
Rules for classification: 1) points; 2) goal difference; 3) number of goals scored.

===== Results =====
Home \ Away	SDA	BSC	DAZ	CDC	SDQ	EN	CSE	LDU	MAC	CDO
Aucas								2–1		
Barcelona								3–0		
Deportivo Azogues								2–0		
Deportivo Cuenca								1–1		
Deportivo Quito								5–1		
El Nacional								0–3		
Emelec								3–0		
LDU Quito	4–3	1–1	0–1	1–0	2–1	1–0	3–3		1–3	1–2
Macará								1–3		
Olmedo								1–0		

Source: RSSSF
Legend: Blue = home team win; Yellow = draw; Red = away team win.

==== Liguilla Final ====
Pos	Team	Pld	W	D	L	GF	GA	GD	BP	Pts	Qualification
1	El Nacional (C)	10	3	5	2	16	11	+5	5	19	2007 Copa Libertadores Second Stage
2	Emelec	10	4	3	3	20	17	+3	2	17	2007 Copa Libertadores Second Stage
3	LDU Quito	10	3	4	3	17	13	+4	3	16	2007 Copa Libertadores First Stage
4	Olmedo	10	3	5	2	14	12	+2	1	15	
5	Barcelona	10	3	4	3	10	15	−5	1	14	
6	Deportivo Quito	10	3	1	6	14	23	−9	0	10	

Source: RSSSF
Rules for classification: 1) points; 2) goal difference; 3) number of goals scored. Include Bonus Points earned in the previous rounds.
(C) Champions

===== Results =====
Home \ Away	BSC	SDQ	EN	CSE	LDU	CDO
Barcelona					1–0	
Deportivo Quito					4–3	
El Nacional					0–3	
Emelec					2–1	
LDU Quito	1–1	4–1	0–0	3–2		1–1
Olmedo					1–1	

Source: RSSSF
Legend: Blue = home team win; Yellow = draw; Red = away team win.

=== Copa Libertadores ===
==== Copa Libertadores squad ====
No.	Pos.	Nation	Player
1	GK	ECU	Luis Preti
2	DF	ECU	Jayro Campos
3	DF	ECU	Santiago Jácome
4	MF	ECU	Paúl Ambrosi
5	MF	ECU	Alfonso Obregón (captain)
6	MF	ECU	Juan Guerrón
7	MF	ECU	Édison Méndez
8	MF	ECU	Patricio Urrutia
9	FW	ECU	Agustín Delgado
10	MF	PER	Roberto Palacios
11	MF	COL	Elkin Murillo

No.	Pos.	Nation	Player
12	GK	ECU	Cristian Mora
13	DF	ECU	Néicer Reasco
14	MF	ECU	Walter Iza
15	MF	ECU	Moisés Candelario
17	DF	ECU	Giovanny Espinoza
18	FW	ARG	Diego Ceballos
19	FW	ECU	Joffre Guerrón
20	MF	PAR	Enrique Vera
22	GK	ECU	Sandro Borja
23	DF	PAR	Carlos Espínola
25	FW	ARG	Ariel Graziani

Overall								Home						Away					
Pld	W	D	L	GF	GA	GD	Pts	W	D	L	GF	GA	GD	W	D	L	GF	GA	GD
10	6	1	3	23	12	+11	19	4	0	1	16	4	+12	2	1	2	7	8	−1

==== Second stage ====
Pos	Team	Pld	W	D	L	GF	GA	GD	Pts	VEL	LDU	ROC	UNI
1	(Argentina) Vélez Sársfield	6	5	1	0	18	6	+12	16		2–2	3–0	4–3
2	(Ecuador) LDU Quito	6	3	1	2	16	9	+7	10	1–3		5–0	4–0
3	(Uruguay) Rocha	6	1	2	3	4	16	−12	5	0–5	3–2		0–0
4	(Peru) Universitario	6	0	2	4	5	12	−7	2	0–1	1–2	1–1	

Legend: Blue = home team win; Yellow = draw; Red = away team win.

February 7 Second Stage	LDU Quito (Ecuador)	1–3	(Argentina) Vélez Sarsfield	Quito, Ecuador
21:00 UTC−05:00	Urrutia 55'	Report	Somoza 36'; Gracián 65'; Zárate 84'	Stadium: Estadio Casa Blanca; Referee: Óscar Ruiz (Colombia)

February 16 Second Stage	Universitario (Peru)	1–2	(Ecuador) LDU Quito	Lima, Peru
21:30 UTC−05:00	Sangoy 22'	Report	Delgado 11', 49'	Stadium: Estadio Monumental "U"; Referee: Pablo Pozo (Chile)

March 7 Second Stage	Rocha (Uruguay)	3–2	(Ecuador) LDU Quito	Maldonado, Uruguay
18:45 UTC−03:00	Cardoso 6', 80'; Segales 27'	Report	Delgado 15'; Urrutia 81'	Stadium: Estadio Domingo Burgueño; Referee: Ricardo Grance (Paraguay)

March 16 Second Stage	LDU Quito (Ecuador)	5–0	(Uruguay) Rocha	Quito, Ecuador
21:30 UTC−05:00	Murillo 14'; Urrutia 25', 62'; Méndez 64'; Candelario 85'	Report		Stadium: Estadio Casa Blanca; Referee: Gustavo Brand (Venezuela)

April 6 Second Stage	LDU Quito (Ecuador)	4–0	(Peru) Universitario	Quito, Ecuador
17:00 UTC−05:00	Delgado 28'; Vera 40'; Méndez 51'; Guerrón 81'	Report		Stadium: Estadio Casa Blanca; Referee: Albert Duarte (Colombia)

April 18 Second Stage	Vélez Sarsfield (Argentina)	2–2	(Ecuador) LDU Quito	Buenos Aires, Argentina
20:30 UTC−03:00	Ereros 55'; Centurión 59' (pen.)	Report	Urrutia 30'; Palacios 57'	Stadium: José Amalfitani Stadium; Referee: Carlos Amarilla (Paraguay)

==== Round of 16 ====
Standings
Pos	Team	Pld	W	D	L	GF	GA	GD	Pts	Qualification
1	LDU Quito (Ecuador)	2	2	0	0	5	0	+5	6	Qualified to the Quarter-finals
2	Atlético Nacional (Colombia)	2	0	0	2	0	5	−5	0	

April 25 Round of 16	LDU Quito (Ecuador)	4–0	(Colombia) Atlético Nacional	Quito, Ecuador
21:30 UTC−05:00	Murillo 10', 12'; Vera 63'; Candelario 74'	Report		Stadium: Estadio Casa Blanca; Referee: Víctor Hugo Rivera (Peru)

May 2 Round of 16	Atlético Nacional (Colombia)	0–1	(Ecuador) LDU Quito	Medellín, Colombia
19:15 UTC−05:00		Report	Méndez 40'	Stadium: Estadio Atanasio Girardot; Referee: Sálvio Fagundes (Brazil)

==== Quarter-finals ====
Standings
Pos	Team	Pld	W	D	L	GF	GA	GD	Pts	Qualification
1	Internacional (Brazil)	2	1	0	1	3	2	+1	3	Qualified to the Semi-finals
2	LDU Quito (Ecuador)	2	1	0	1	2	3	−1	3	

May 10 Quarter-finals	LDU Quito (Ecuador)	2–1	(Brazil) Internacional	Quito, Ecuador
18:30 UTC−05:00	Delgado 58'; Graziani 84'	Report	Jorge Wagner 25'	Stadium: Estadio Casa Blanca; Referee: Horacio Elizondo (Argentina)

July 19 Quarter-finals	Internacional (Brazil)	2–0	(Ecuador) LDU Quito	Porto Alegre, Brazil
20:15 UTC−03:00	Rafael Sóbis 52'; Rentería 87'	Report		Stadium: Estádio Beira-Rio; Referee: Jorge Larrionda (Uruguay)

=== Copa Sudamericana ===
==== Copa Sudamericana squad ====
No.	Pos.	Nation	Player
1	GK	ECU	Luis Preti
2	DF	ECU	Jayro Campos
3	DF	ECU	Santiago Jácome
4	MF	ECU	Paúl Ambrosi
5	MF	ECU	Alfonso Obregón (captain)
6	MF	ECU	Juan Guerrón
8	MF	ECU	Patricio Urrutia
9	FW	ECU	Agustín Delgado
10	MF	PER	Roberto Palacios
11	FW	ECU	Franklin Salas
12	GK	ECU	Cristian Mora

No.	Pos.	Nation	Player
13	MF	ECU	Pedro Larrea
14	MF	ECU	Walter Iza
15	MF	ECU	Moisés Candelario
16	MF	COL	Elkin Murillo
17	DF	ECU	Giovanny Espinoza
18	FW	VEN	Héctor González
19	FW	ECU	Joffre Guerrón
20	MF	PAR	Enrique Vera
22	GK	ECU	Sandro Borja
23	DF	PAR	Carlos Espínola
25	FW	ARG	Ariel Graziani

Overall								Home						Away					
Pld	W	D	L	GF	GA	GD	Pts	W	D	L	GF	GA	GD	W	D	L	GF	GA	GD
2	0	1	1	3	4	−1	1	0	0	1	2	3	−1	0	1	0	1	1	0

==== First stage ====
First Stage standings
Pos	Team	Pld	W	D	L	GF	GA	GD	Pts
1	El Nacional (Ecuador)	2	1	1	0	4	3	+1	4
2	LDU Quito (Ecuador)	2	0	1	1	3	4	−1	1

August 22 First Stage	LDU Quito (Ecuador)	2–3	(Ecuador) El Nacional	Quito, Ecuador
14:45 UTC−05:00	Delgado 53'; Candelario 76'	Report	Calle 44'; Ordóñez 45'; Caicedo 81'	Stadium: Estadio Casa Blanca; Referee: Samuel Haro (Ecuador)

August 30 First Stage	El Nacional (Ecuador)	1–1	(Ecuador) LDU Quito	Quito, Ecuador
14:00 UTC−05:00	Ordóñez 50'	Report	Candelario 22'	Stadium: Estadio Olímpico Atahualpa; Referee: José Carpio (Ecuador)
