= 2007 Campeonato Ecuatoriano de Fútbol Serie A =

Annual soccer tournament

Copa Pílsener Serie A
- Season: 2007
- Champions: LDU Quito (9th Title)
- Relegated: Imbabura
- Copa Libertadores: Deportivo Cuenca; LDU Quito; Olmedo
- Copa Sudamericana: 2007: Olmedo; 2008: LDU Quito
- Matches: 210
- Goals: 529 (2.52 per match)
- Top goalscorer: Juan Carlos Ferreyra (17 goals)
- Biggest home win: LDU Quito 5–0 Imbabura (Aug 29)
- Biggest away win: Imbabura 1–6 LDU Quito (Apr 29)
- Highest scoring: Emelec 4–3 LDU Quito (Feb 25); Imbabura 1–6 LDU Quito (Apr 29); Emelec 4–3 El Nacional (Jun 13)
- Longest winning run: 4 matches: Deportivo Azogues (Apr 06 – Apr 29); LDU Quito (Apr 29 – May 20 & Sep 16 – Sep 29)
- Longest unbeaten run: 17 matches: LDU Quito (Aug 29 – Dec 9)
- Longest losing run: 5 matches: Imbabura (Feb 25 – Apr 01)

The 2007 Campeonato Ecuatoriano de Fútbol de la Serie A (known as 2007 Copa Pílsener Serie A for sponsorship reasons) was the 49th season of Ecuador's Serie A, the country's top football league. The season began on February 10. LDU Quito won their 9th title.

== Format ==
The format for this season remains the same as the previous season.

The First Stage and Second Stage are identical. The ten teams competed in a double round-robin tournament, one game at home and one away. The top three teams in each stage qualified to the Liguilla Final with bonus points (3, 2, and 1 point[s], respectively). The winner of each group also qualified to the 2007 and 2008 Copa Sudamericana, respectively. At the end of the second stage, the team with the fewest points in the First and Second Stage aggregate table was relegated to the Serie B.

The Liguilla Final was a double round-robin tournament between the six qualified teams of the First and Second Stage. The winner of the Liguilla Final was crowned the Serie A champion. The champion and runner-up also qualified to the 2008 Copa Libertadores into the Second Stage, while the third-place finisher qualified to the First Stage.

== Teams ==
The number of teams remained the same for this season. Aucas was relegated after the Second Stage of the 2006 season. They were replaced by Imbabura, the 2006 Serie B E2 winner, who was making their first appearance in the Serie A.

Club	Home city	Stadium
Barcelona	Guayaquil	Monumental Banco Pichincha
Deportivo Azogues	Azogues	Municipal Jorge Andrade Cantos
Deportivo Cuenca	Cuenca	Alejandro Serrano Aguilar
Deportivo Quito	Quito	Olímpico Atahualpa
El Nacional	Quito	Olímpico Atahualpa
Emelec	Guayaquil	George Capwell
Imbabura	Ibarra	Olímpico de Ibarra
LDU Quito	Quito	La Casa Blanca
Macará	Ambato	Bellavista
Olmedo	Riobamba	Olímpico de Riobamba

== First stage ==
The first stage was played between February 1, 2007 and June 13, 2007.

Pos	Team	Pld	W	D	L	GF	GA	GD	Pts	Qualification
1	Olmedo	18	11	4	3	27	15	+12	37	2007 Copa Sudamericana Preliminary Round & Liguilla Final
2	Deportivo Cuenca	18	10	2	6	26	19	+7	32	Qualified to the Liguilla Final
3	LDU Quito	18	8	4	6	36	26	+10	28	Qualified to the Liguilla Final
4	Deportivo Azogues	18	8	4	6	26	26	0	28	
5	El Nacional	18	8	3	7	37	27	+10	27	
6	Deportivo Quito	18	5	6	7	21	26	−5	21	
7	Barcelona	18	5	5	8	19	28	−9	20	
8	Imbabura	18	5	5	8	21	23	−2	20	
9	Macará	18	5	3	10	25	31	−6	18	
10	Emelec	18	4	6	8	23	30	−7	18	

Updated to match(es) played on June 13, 2007. Source: 2007 First Stage Table
Rules for classification: 1) points; 2) goal difference; 3) number of goals scored.

== Second stage ==
The second stage was played between July 15, 2007 and October 7, 2007.

Pos	Team	Pld	W	D	L	GF	GA	GD	Pts	Qualification
1	LDU Quito	18	10	3	5	28	11	+17	33	2008 Copa Sudamericana First Stage & Liguilla Final
2	El Nacional	18	9	5	4	24	18	+6	32	Qualified to the Liguilla Final
3	Deportivo Quito	18	9	2	7	22	15	+7	29	Qualified to the Liguilla Final
4	Emelec	18	8	2	8	23	21	+2	26	
5	Deportivo Azogues	18	7	3	8	20	25	−5	24	
6	Barcelona	18	7	3	8	19	25	−6	24	
7	Olmedo	18	5	7	6	13	15	−2	22	
8	Macará	18	5	6	7	21	25	−4	21	
9	Deportivo Cuenca	18	5	4	9	22	24	−2	19	
10	Imbabura	18	4	7	7	18	30	−12	19	

Updated to match(es) played on October 7, 2007. Source: 2007 Second Stage Table
Rules for classification: 1) points; 2) goal difference; 3) number of goals scored.

== Aggregate table ==
Pos	Team	Pld	W	D	L	GF	GA	GD	Pts	Qualification or relegation
1	LDU Quito	36	18	7	11	64	37	+27	61	
2	El Nacional	36	17	8	11	61	45	+16	59	
3	Olmedo	36	16	11	9	22	15	+7	59	
4	Deportivo Azogues	36	15	7	14	46	51	−5	52	Qualified to the Liguilla Final (Note: Deportivo Azogues qualified as the best team in the aggregate table not qualified as a top-three team in the First or Second Stage. They earned no bonus points.)
5	Deportivo Cuenca	36	15	6	15	48	44	+4	51	
6	Deportivo Quito	36	14	8	14	43	41	+2	50	
7	Emelec	36	12	8	16	46	51	−5	44	
8	Barcelona	32	12	8	12	38	53	−15	44	
9	Macará	36	10	9	17	46	56	−10	39	
10	Imbabura	36	9	12	15	39	63	−24	39	Relegation to Serie B

Updated to match(es) played on October 7, 2007. Source: RSSSF
Rules for classification: 1) points; 2) goal difference; 3) number of goals scored.

== Liguilla Final ==
The Liguilla Final was played between October 21, 2007 and December 16, 2007.

Pos	Team	Pld	W	D	L	GF	GA	GD	BP	Pts	Qualification
1	LDU Quito	10	7	2	1	13	4	+9	4	27	2008 Copa Libertadores Second Stage
2	Deportivo Cuenca	10	4	6	0	12	5	+7	2	20	2008 Copa Libertadores Second Stage
3	Olmedo	10	4	4	2	9	5	+4	3	19	2008 Copa Libertadores First Stage
4	Deportivo Azogues	10	4	2	4	8	8	0	0	14	
5	El Nacional	10	1	3	6	10	18	−8	2	8	
6	Deportivo Quito	10	1	1	8	6	18	−12	1	5	

Updated to match(es) played on December 16, 2007. Source: 2007 Liguilla Final Table
Rules for classification: 1) points; 2) goal difference; 3) number of goals scored. Includes Bonus Points earned from the previous rounds.

Copa Pílsener Serie A
2007 champion

9th title

== Top goalscorers ==
Pos	Player	Club	Goals
1	(Argentina) Juan Carlos Ferreyra	Deportivo Cuenca	17
2	(Argentina) Luis Miguel Escalada	LDU Quito	16
2	(Ecuador) Christian Lara	LDU Quito	16
2	(Argentina) Daniel Neculman	Imbabura	16
5	(Ecuador) Pablo Palacios	Deportivo Quito	15
6	(Ecuador) Iván Kaviedes	El Nacional	14
7	(Argentina) Pedro Galván	Olmedo	13
8	(Argentina) Germán Castillo	Deportivo Cuenca	12
8	(Ecuador) Jorge Ladines	Emelec	12
10	(Argentina) Martín Mandra	Deportivo Azogues	11

== See also ==
- Serie A de Ecuador
- 2007 Copa Libertadores
- 2007 Copa Sudamericana
- 2007 in Ecuadorian football
- Federación Ecuatoriana de Fútbol
