= 2006 in Ecuadorian football =

Football in Ecuador
- Season: 2006

The 2006 season was the 84th season of competitive football in Ecuador.

== National leagues ==
=== Serie A ===
- Champion: El Nacional (13th title)
- International cup qualifiers:
  - 2007 Copa Libertadores: El Nacional, Emelec, LDU Quito
  - 2006 Copa Sudamericana: LDU Quito
  - 2007 Copa Sudamericana: El Nacional
- Relegated: ESPOLI (after first stage); Aucas (after second stage)

=== Serie B ===
- Winner:
  - Apertura: Deportivo Azogues (1st title)
  - Clausura: Imbabura (1st title)
- Promoted: Deportivo Azogues (after first stage); Imbabura (after second stage)
- Relegated: Esmeraldas Petrolero, Deportivo Quevedo

=== Segunda ===
- Winner: Brasilia
- Promoted: Brasilia, Municipal Cañar

== Clubs in international competitions ==
Team	2006 Copa Libertadores	2006 Copa Sudamericana
Deportivo Cuenca	Eliminated in the First Stage	N/A
El Nacional	Eliminated in the Second Stage	Eliminated in the Round of 16
LDU Quito	Eliminated in the quarterfinals	Eliminated in the Preliminary Stage

== National team ==
=== Senior team ===
The Ecuador national team played in eleven international matches: four during the 2006 FIFA World Cup, and seven friendlies.

==== FIFA World Cup ====
Ecuador played in their second consecutive FIFA World Cup.

===== Group stage =====
Ecuador was drawn into Group A along with Costa Rica, hosts Germany, and Poland. After shutout wins against Poland and Costa Rica, Ecuador secured a spot in the Round of 16. Their last match of group play was a loss to the host team, making them the group runner-up.

Team	Pld	W	D	L	GF	GA	GD	Pts
Germany	3	3	0	0	8	2	+6	9
Ecuador	3	2	0	1	5	3	+2	6
Poland	3	1	0	2	2	4	−2	3
Costa Rica	3	0	0	3	3	9	−6	0

9 June 2006
21:00 (UTC+2)

Poland	0 – 2	Ecuador
	(Report)	C. Tenorio 24'; Delgado 80'

FIFA WM Stadion Gelsenkirchen, Gelsenkirchen
Attendance: 52,000
Referee: Toru Kamikawa (Japan)

15 June 2006
15:00 (UTC+2)

Ecuador	3 – 0	Costa Rica
C. Tenorio 8'; Delgado 54'; Kaviedes 90+2'	(Report)

FIFA WM Stadion Hamburg, Hamburg
Attendance: 50,000
Referee: Coffi Codjia (Benin)

20 June 2006
16:00 (UTC+2)

Ecuador	0 – 3	Germany
	(Report)	Klose 4', 44'; Podolski 57'

Olympiastadion, Berlin
Attendance: 72,000
Referee: Valentin Ivanov (Russia)

===== Round of 16 =====
Ecuador was matched-up against Group B winner, England. Despite a close game, a free-kick goal by English captain David Beckham proved to be the difference in the game and were eliminated. To date, this is the furthest progression in the tournament.

25 June 2006
17:00 (UTC+2)

England	1 – 0	Ecuador
Beckham 60'	(Report)

Gottlieb-Daimler-Stadion, Stuttgart
Attendance: 52,000
Referee: Frank De Bleeckere (Belgium)

==== Friendlies ====
2006-01-25

Ecuador	1 – 0	Honduras
Caicedo 67'

Estadio Modelo, Guayaquil
Referee: Pedro Ramos (Ecuador)

2006-03-01

Netherlands	1 – 0	Ecuador
Kuyt 48'

Amsterdam Arena, Amsterdam
Referee: Olegário Benquerença (Portugal)

2006-03-30

Japan	1 – 0	Ecuador
Sato 85'

Ōita Stadium, Ōita
Referee: Shamsul Maidin (Singapore)

2006-05-24

Ecuador	1 – 1	Colombia
Castillo 52'		Soto 55'

Giants Stadium, East Rutherford, New Jersey
Referee: Terry Vaughn (United States)

2006-05-28

Ecuador	1 – 2	North Macedonia
Tenorio 52'		Maznov 28'; Mitreski 73'

Coliseum Alfonso Pérez, Getafe
Referee: Carlos del Cerro Grande (Spain)

2006-09-06

Ecuador	1 – 1	Peru
Benítez 14'		Guerrero 75'

Giants Stadium, East Rutherford, New Jersey
Referee: Terry Vaughn (United States)

2006-10-10

Ecuador	1 – 2	Brazil
Borja 22'		Fred 44'; Kaká 74'

Råsunda Stadium, Solna
Referee: Stefan Johansson (Sweden)
