= Torales =

Torales is a Spanish surname. Notable people with the surname include:

- Jorge Torales (born 1984), Paraguayan footballer
- Juan Torales (born 1956), Paraguayan footballer
- Sergio Torales (born 1982), Paraguayan footballer
- Silvio Torales (born 1991), Paraguayan footballer
