= Richard Mercado =

Ecuadorian professional footballer (born 1986)

Personal information
- Full name: Richar Luis Mercado Corozo
- Date of birth: 20 December 1986 (age 39)
- Place of birth: Esmeraldas, Ecuador
- Height: 1.96 m (6 ft 5 in)
- Position: Forward

Team information
- Current team: Guayaquil SC

Senior career*
Years	Team	Apps	(Gls)
2004–2006	UT Cotopaxi	20	(5)
2007	El Nacional	8	(2)
2008	Melgar	21	(5)
2009	Manta	8	(0)
2009	Deportivo Azogues	11	(1)
2010	Independiente José Terán	8	(1)
2010	Técnico Universitario	13	(3)
2011	Deportivo Quevedo	2	(0)
2011	Mushuc Runa	3	(2)
2011–2013	Montevideo Wanderers	37	(11)
2014	→ Olmedo (loan)	5	(0)
2015	Universitario de Sucre	6	(1)
2016	Atlético Pantoja		
2017–2018	Villa Española	12	(2)
2018	LDU Portoviejo	?	(4)
2019	Águila	15	(1)
2020	Rocha		
2021–	Guayaquil SC		
- * Club domestic league appearances and goals

Richar Luis Mercado Corozo (born December 20, 1986, in Esmeraldas, Ecuador) is an Ecuadorian professional footballer who plays as a forward.

== Club career ==
Mercado started his professional career playing for U.T. de Cotopaxi in August 2004, playing in the Ecuadorian Segunda Categoría. After two years in this club, he took a big step in his career, signing with Ecuadorian giants El Nacional.

In January 2008, he signed a deal with Peruvian side FBC Melgar.

In mid 2011, Mercado signed a contract with Uruguayan side Montevideo Wanderers.

=== Later career ===
In December 2018, Mercado signed with Águila of the Salvadoran Primera División. He left the club in the summer 2019.

In February 2020, it was reported that Mercado had joined Paraguayan club Sportivo Luqueño. However, in October 2020 Luqueño confirmed on Twitter, that Mercado never had signed officially with the club, but only trained with the team and played a few friendly games for them. This clarification came after Mercado was presented at Uruguayan club Rocha in October 2020, where Rocha, in a part of the welcome, mentioned Sportivo Luqueño as Mercado's last club. Mercado later sued Luqueño because he claimed, that he had signed a contract with the club and didn't receive the payment of the commitments contained in the contract.

Mercado officially joined Uruguayan club Rocha F.C. in the beginning of October 2020. In March 2021, Mercado joined Guayaquil SC.

== Honours ==
=== Player ===
==== Club ====
C.D. Águila

- Primera División
  - Champion: Clausura 2019
