= Ayoví =

Ayoví may refer to:

- Arlín Ayoví (born 1979), Ecuadorian footballer
- Jaime Ayoví (born 1988), Ecuadorian footballer
- Marlon Ayoví (born 1971), Ecuadorian footballer
- Orlindo Ayoví (born 1984), Ecuadorian footballer
- Walter Ayoví (born 1979), Ecuadorian footballer
- Guillermo Ayoví Erazo (born 1930), better known as Papá Roncón, Afro-Ecuadorian musician
- José Ayoví (born 1991), Ecuadorian footballer
