= Pedro Cardoso =

Pedro Cardoso may refer to:

== Footballers ==
- Pedro Miguel Cardoso Monteiro, Cape Verdean footballer known as Pelé
- Pedro Gonçalo Gonçalves Mesquita Cardoso, Portuguese footballer
- Pedro Cardoso (footballer), Uruguayan footballer

== Others ==
- Pedro Cardoso (actor) (born 1962), Brazilian actor
- Pedro Cardoso (cyclist), in GP Internacional Paredes Rota dos Móveis
- Pedro Cardoso (poet) (1890–1942), Cape Verdean writer, poet and folklorist
