= Luis Mercado =

Luis Mercado can refer to:

- Luis de Mercado (16th century), Spanish king Felipe II's chamber doctor, see Portrait of a Doctor
- Luis Edgardo Mercado Jarrín (1919–2012), Peruvian politician and prime minister from 1973 to 1975
- Luis Borrero Mercado (fl. 1929), Colombian politician and mayor of Bogotá
- Luis Enrique Mercado (born 1952), Mexican journalist and politician
- Luis Mercado (fl. 2005), Puerto Rican race walker; see 2005 Pan American Race Walking Cup
- Luis Mercado (f'. 2010–2011), Honduran footballer in Honduran Liga Nacional
- Luis Mercado, host of the web series To Catch a Cheater

== See also ==
- Luis Gonzales (also Luis Mercado, 1928–2012), Filipino actor
- Héctor Mercado (Héctor Luis Mercado, born 1974), Puerto Rican baseball player
- Richard Mercado (Richard Luis Mercado Corozo, born 1986), Ecuadorian footballer
