= Triviño =

Triviño is a surname. Notable people with the surname include:

- Juan Triviño (born 1980), Ecuadorian footballer
- Lou Trivino (born 1991), American baseball player
- Ricardo Triviño (born 1973), Mexican rally driver
- Tulio Triviño, fictional character in Chilean comedy TV series 31 Minutos
- Juancho Triviño (born 1993), Filipino actor
