= Luis Macias =

Luis Macias may refer to:

- Luis Macias (Mexican footballer) (born 1972), Mexican football forward
- Luis Macias (cyclist) (born 1982), Mexican cyclist
- Luis Macias (Ecuadorian footballer) (born 1985), Ecuadorian football attacking midfielder
