= Club Deportivo Valle del Chota =

Ecuadorian football club

Valle del Chota
- Full name: Club Deportivo Valle del Chota
- Founded: September 27, 2001; 24 years ago
- Ground: Estadio Olímpico de Ibarra
- Capacity: 18,600
- Chairman: Agustín Delgado Chalá
- Manager: Juan Yépez
- League: Segunda Categoría
- 2012: Serie B, 12th (relegated)
Home colours	Away colours

Club Deportivo Valle del Chota is an Ecuadorian professional football club based in Ibarra. It is the current winner of the Segunda Categoría, for which it has gained promotion to the second-level Serie B for the 2011 season.

== Current squad ==
Note: Flags indicate national team as defined under FIFA eligibility rules; some limited exceptions apply. Players may hold more than one non-FIFA nationality.

No.	Pos.	Nation	Player
1	GK	ECU	Juan Francisco Delgado
3	MF	BRA	Junior Mota
4	DF	ECU	Juan Kely Guerron
6	MF	ECU	Ronal Rodriguez
8	MF	ECU	Erik de Jesús
9	FW	ECU	Jeferson Congo
11	FW	ECU	Ruben Dario Delgado
13	FW	ECU	Diego Betancourt
14	MF	ECU	Fabricio Garcia
15	MF	ECU	Diego Anangono
16	MF	ECU	Andres Padilla
17	MF	ECU	Cristobal Rodriguez

No.	Pos.	Nation	Player
18	DF	ECU	Jefferson Lara
19	FW	ECU	Carlos Lara
20	FW	ECU	Elvis Vasquez
21	FW	ECU	Diego Rodolfo Ayala
22	MF	ECU	José Rodríguez
24	MF	ECU	Victor Chala
25	DF	ECU	Jose Ricardo Pavon
50	MF	ECU	Fernando Delgado
52	MF	ECU	Felix Adan Delgado
55	MF	ECU	Geordi Palacios
—	FW	ECU	Armando Paredes
