= José Luis Cortez =

Ecuadorian footballer (born 1979)

Personal information
- Full name: José Luis Cortez Arroyo
- Date of birth: November 21, 1979 (age 46)
- Place of birth: Ecuador
- Height: 1.82 m (6 ft 0 in)
- Position: Center midfielder

Team information
- Current team: Club Deportivo Quevedo
- Number: 5

Senior career*
| Years | Team | Apps | (Gls) |
| 1998–2004 | Espoli | 115 | (4) |
| 2005 | Aucas | 43 | (1) |
| 2006 | Espoli | 14 | (0) |
| 2006 | Deportivo Azogues | 16 | (0) |
| 2007 | Barcelona SC | 22 | (0) |
| 2008–2009 | Deportivo Quito | 53 | (3) |
| 2010 | Universidad Católica | 44 | (1) |
| 2011 | Independiente José Terán | 21 | (0) |
| 2012 | Macará | 32 | (0) |
| 2013 | Club Deportivo Quevedo | | |

International career^{‡}
| 2005– | Ecuador | 5 | (3) |
- * Club domestic league appearances and goals as of 15 August 2013 ‡ National team caps and goals as of 15 August 2013

José Luis Cortez (born November 21, 1979, in Guayaquil) is an Ecuadorian footballer currently playing for Club Deportivo Quevedo.

== Club career ==
Pépe's first started out at Espoli. In 2005, he was loaned to Aucas, but returned to Espoli the following season. Cortez also played for Deportivo Azogues before transferring to Barcelona Sporting Club for the 2007 campaign.

After spending one year in Barcelona SC, he became the new official player of Deportivo Quito.

In Deportivo Quito, Pépe had a great season. So far he has 34 appearances scoring two goals for the club. He played in the Copa Sudamericana 2008 where his team eventually fell to San Luis F.C. He is guaranteed a starting position and plays in the center midfield. Cortez is a key player to Dep. Quito and he is often called to the national team.

In December 2008, Dep. Quito won the Copa Pilsener 2008 with Pépe's help.

== International career ==
He made his debut on the national team against Chile in the final game of the FIFA 2006 World Cup qualifier. He was called up to play against Iran and Oman in a friendly tournament.
