= Daniel Suarez (disambiguation) =

Daniel Suarez may refer to:

- Daniel Suarez (author) (born 1964), American novelist
- Daniel Alberto Néculman Suárez (born 1985), Argentine footballer
- Daniel Suárez (born 1992), Mexican-born racing driver (NASCAR)
