= Gonçalo Cardoso =

Gonçalo Cardoso may refer to:

- Gonçalo Cardoso (footballer, born 1990), Portuguese footballer
- Gonçalo Cardoso (footballer, born 2000), Portuguese footballer
