= 2007 in Ecuadorian football =

Football in Ecuador
- Season: 2007

The 2007 season is the 85th season of competitive football in Ecuador.

== National leagues ==
=== Serie A ===
- Champion: LDU Quito (9th title)
- Runner-up: Deportivo Cuenca
- International qualifiers:
  - 2008 Copa Libertadores: LDU Quito, Deportivo Cuenca, El Nacional
  - 2007 Copa Sudamericana: Olmedo
  - 2008 Copa Sudamericana: LDU Quito
- Relegated: Imbabura

=== Serie B ===
- Winner: Universidad Católica
- Runner-up: ESPOLI
- Promoted: Universidad Católica, ESPOLI, Técnico Universitario
- Relegated: Delfín

=== Segunda ===
- Winner: Independiente José Terán
- Runner-up: Grecia
- Promoted: Independiente José Terán, Grecia, LDU Cuenca

== Clubs in international competitions ==
Team	Copa Libertadores 2007	Copa Sudamericana 2007
El Nacional	Eliminated in the Group stage	Eliminated in the Round of 16
Emelec	Eliminated in the Group stage	N/A
LDU Quito	Eliminated in the Group stage	N/A
Olmedo	N/A	Eliminated in preliminary round

== National team ==
=== Senior team ===
Luis Fernando Suárez resigned as the head coach of the senior team. He was replaced by Sixto Vizuete, who was previously the coach of the U-20 team.

==== Copa América ====
Ecuador participated in their 24th Copa América. They were drawn into Group B and finished last in the group.

Team	Pld	W	D	L	GF	GA	GD	Pts
Mexico	3	2	1	0	4	1	+3	7
Brazil	3	2	0	1	4	2	+2	6
Chile	3	1	1	1	3	5	−2	4
Ecuador	3	0	0	3	3	6	−3	0

2007-06-27
18:35

Ecuador	2 – 3	Chile
Valencia 16'; Benítez 23'	Report	Suazo 20', 80'; Villanueva 86'

Polideportivo Cachamay, Puerto Ordaz
Attendance: 35,000
Referee: Óscar Ruiz (Colombia)

2007-07-01
18:20

Mexico	2 – 1	Ecuador
Castillo 21'; Bravo 79'	Report	Méndez 84'

Estadio Monumental de Maturín, Maturín
Attendance: 52,000
Referee: René Ortube (Bolivia)

2007-07-04
20:50

Brazil	1 – 0	Ecuador
Robinho 56' (pen.)	Report

Estadio Olímpico Luis Ramos, Puerto la Cruz
Attendance: 38,000
Referee: Sergio Pezzotta (Argentina)

==== World Cup qualifying ====
CONMEBOL's qualification for the 2010 FIFA World Cup started in 2007.

2007-10-13
17:50 UTC-5

Ecuador	0 – 1	Venezuela
	Report	Rey 68'

Estadio Olímpico Atahualpa, Quito
Attendance: 29,644
Referee: René Ortubé (Bolivia)

2007-10-17
21:45 UTC-2

Brazil	5 – 0	Ecuador
Vágner Love 19'; Ronaldinho 72'; Kaká 77', 85'; Elano 83'	Report

Estádio do Maracanã, Rio de Janeiro
Attendance: 87,000
Referee: Jorge Larrionda (Uruguay)

2007-11-17
20:10 UTC-3

Paraguay	5 – 1	Ecuador
Valdez 8'; Riveros 26', 87'; Santa Cruz 50'; Ayala 82'	Report	Kaviedes 79'

Estadio Defensores del Chaco, Asunción
Attendance: 25,433
Referee: Heber Lopes (Brazil)

2007-11-21
16:30 UTC-5

Ecuador	5 – 1	Peru
Ayoví 10', 48'; Kaviedes 24'; Méndez 44', 62'	Report	Mendoza 86'

Estadio Olímpico Atahualpa, Quito
Attendance: 28,557
Referee: Carlos Chandia (Chile)
