= Jaime Ayoví =

Ecuadorian footballer (born 1988)

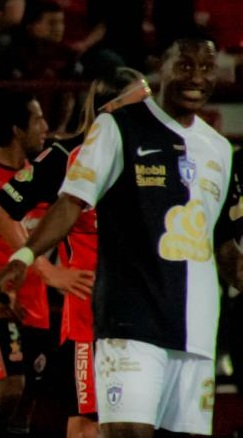
- Ayoví playing for Pachuca

Personal information
- Full name: Jaime Javier Ayoví Corozo
- Date of birth: 21 February 1988 (age 38)
- Place of birth: Eloy Alfaro, Esmeraldas, Ecuador
- Height: 1.86 m (6 ft 1 in)
- Position: Forward

Team information
- Current team: Emelec
- Number: 17

Youth career
- 2004–2005: Paladín "S"
- 2005: Espol
- 2006–2008: Emelec

Senior career*
Years	Team	Apps	(Gls)
2006–2010	Emelec	75	(26)
2009	→ Manta (loan)	34	(7)
2011	Toluca	12	(5)
2011–2013	Pachuca	33	(8)
2012–2013	→ Al-Nassr (loan)	15	(8)
2013–2015	Tijuana	8	(1)
2013	→ LDU Quito (loan)	15	(8)
2014	→ Godoy Cruz (loan)	13	(9)
2015–2017	Godoy Cruz	59	(26)
2017–2018	Beijing Renhe	35	(21)
2018–2020	Shabab Al Ahli	21	(12)
2020	Guayaquil City	8	(0)
2020	LDU Portoviejo	9	(0)
2021	Olmedo	13	(8)
2021	Estudiantes	17	(1)
2022–2023	Independiente del Valle	15	(2)
2023	Gençlerbirliği	12	(1)
2023-	C.S. Emelec	56	(12)

International career^{‡}
2010–2016	Ecuador	40	(10)
- * Club domestic league appearances and goals as of 20 August 2025 ‡ National team caps and goals as of 16 June 2016

Jaime Javier Ayoví Corozo (Spanish pronunciation: [ˈxajme aʝoˈβi]) (born 21 February 1988 in Eloy Alfaro, Esmeraldas) is an Ecuadorian footballer who plays for Emelec.

== Club career ==
=== Emelec ===
Ayoví started at the lower division club Paladín "S". In 2006, his cousin Walter Ayoví recommended him to try out at Emelec. He did and was impressive enough to be signed on a 4-year deal when he was 18 years.

Despite his height and size he started playing as an open forward, or a winger and not as a center forward, because he is very skilled with the ball and very fast and he did not like to have to go down the middle but preferred to run to the sides where there was more space to move.

On 2009 he was loaned to first division club Manta to gain more minutes and experience. He did well playing in 32 matches of the Ecuadorian league and scoring 7 goals, despite this Emelec management were going to loan him again for the next season, but newly signed manager Jorge Sampaoli saw videos of Ayoví and requested him to stay in the 2010 squad, as a first substitution for the Argentinian striker Hernan Peirone.

As the 2010 season started it was becoming clear that Ayoví would have plenty more chances than expected and soon he became Sampaoli's first choice for the attack leaving Peirone in the bench. Ayoví did not disappoint and quickly started scoring important goals for his team, and was absolutely key to Emelec winning the first stage of the 2010 Ecuadorian tournament and reaching the final to be played in December 2010.

=== Toluca ===
==== 2011 ====
After the 2010 Ecuadorian season ended Jaime agree to join Mexican team Toluca on a three-year deal. He scored his first goal in his second appearance against Chiapas. On February 13 he scored his second in an emphatic 5–0 away win against Querétaro. He scored in a 3–2 home loss against Necaxa. On 13 February Ayovi scored an impressive header against Santos Laguna, in just under a minute of game time. Toluca won 3–1 at home turf. His final goal with Toluca came on 3 April and impressive solo effort, to draw the game against Monterrey 1–1.

=== Pachuca ===
==== 2011–12 season ====
After only half a season, Ayovi impressed the Pachuca manager, which sought to sign him for the team, Pachuca. His first goal for Pachuca was on 31 June, in a 2–2 away draw against Puebla FC. He would only score 3 more goals for the rest of the Apertura season against Cruz Azul, Estudiantes Tecos and Atlante FC. The 2012 Clausura would prove to be the same, scoring only 4 goals against Puebla, Cruz Azul, Querétaro and Chivas de Guadalajara. Due to his form with Pachuca, he was loaned to Saudi Arabian Premier League club Al Nassr.

=== Loan to Al Nassr FC ===
==== 2012–13 season ====
Jaime Ayovi was loaned to Al Nassr FC for an undisclosed fee which may lead up to the end of the Saudi Premier League season. On 29 September, Ayovi scored his first goal with Al Nassr, winning 3–1 against Al Wahda. He would go on to score 7 more goals for Al Nassr, including 2 doubles against Al Faisaly and Al Taawon, winning 2–1 and 3–2. His Saudi Premier League season was cut short when he was injured and was side-lined for 8 months. He finished his season with Al Nassr with 8 goals in 15 matches.

=== Club Tijuana ===
Northern Mexican football club Xolos de Tijuana signed Jaime Ayoví, with the agreement that he would be loaned to Ecuadorian giants LDU Quito for one full season, to fully recover his lost form due to injury.

==== 2013 ====
Jaime Ayovi was given the number 11 jersey for his year-long stay at LDU Quito. On 17 August Ayovi scored his first goals, in a 2–2 home draw against Independiente del Valle. On 22 September Jaime scored his third in a 1–1 home draw against Macara. On October 3 he scored again in a 1–1 home draw versus Deportivo Quito. On 27 October Jaime scored his fifth goal with LDU Quito, in a 2–1 home win over LDU Loja. On November 10 Ayovi scored another double, this time in a 3–1 home win over Deportivo Quevedo.

==== Return to Tijuana ====
On 7 March 2014, Ayoví scored his first goal for Tijuana against Guadalajara in a 2-0 Home Win. On 17 July 2014 it was confirmed that Ayoví would no longer fit the plans of the club.

==== Loan to Godoy Cruz ====
On 14 August 2014, it was confirmed that Ayoví would play for Godoy Cruz on loan for 6 months.

==== Beijing Renhe ====
On 20 February 2017, it was confirmed that Ayoví would play for Chinese League One side Beijing Renhe.

=== Gençlerbirliği ===
On 5 January 2023, Ayoví joined TFF First League club Gençlerbirliği on a one-and-a-half-year deal.

== International career ==
Ayoví was called by Ecuador's new manager, the Colombian Reinaldo Rueda, to defend the Ecuador national team for the first time in a match against Mexico in Guadalajara on 4 September 2010, when he played well and even managed to score Ecuador's second goal for an overall 2–1 victory.

== Career statistics ==
=== Club ===
As of match played 8 December 2025

Appearances and goals by club, season and competition
Club	Season	League			Cup		Continental		Other		Total	
Club	Season	Division	Apps	Goals	Apps	Goals	Apps	Goals	Apps	Goals	Apps	Goals
Emelec	2006	Serie A	13	0	—		—		—		13	0
Emelec	2007	Serie A	15	2	—		3	0	—		18	2
Emelec	2008	Serie A	6	1	—		—		—		6	1
Emelec	2010	Serie A	42	23	—		10	2	—		52	25
Emelec	Total		76	26	—		13	2	—		89	28
Manta (loan)	2009	Serie A	34	7	—		—		—		34	7
Toluca	2010–11	Mexican Primera División	12	5	—		2	0	—		14	5
Pachuca	2011–12	Mexican Primera División	33	8	—		—		—		33	8
Al-Nassr (loan)	2012–13	Saudi Pro League	15	8	3	0	—		—		18	8
Tijuana	2013–14	Liga MX	8	1	—		3	2	—		11	3
LDU Quito (loan)	2013	Serie A	15	8	—		—		—		15	8
Godoy Cruz (loan)	2014	Argentine Primera División	13	9	—		1	0	—		14	9
Godoy Cruz	2015	Argentine Primera División	18	5	0	0	—		—		18	5
Godoy Cruz	2016	Argentine Primera División	16	6	—		—		—		16	6
Godoy Cruz	2016–17	Argentine Primera División	12	6	2	0	—		—		14	6
Godoy Cruz	Total		59	26	2	0	1	0	—		62	23
Beijing Renhe	2017	China League One	29	20	0	0	—		—		29	20
Beijing Renhe	2018	Chinese Super League	6	1	0	0	—		—		6	1
Beijing Renhe	Total		35	21	0	0	—		—		35	21
Shabab Al Ahli	2018–19	UAE Pro League	21	12	4	1	—		7	5	32	18
Godoy Cruz	2019–20	Argentine Primera División	0	0	—		—		1	0	1	0
Guayaquil City	2020	Serie A	8	0	—		—		—		8	0
LDU Portoviejo	2020	Serie A	9	0	—		—		—		9	0
Olmedo	2021	Serie A	13	8	—		—		—		13	8
Estudiantes	2021	Argentine Primera División	17	1	—		—		—		17	1
Independiente del Valle	2022	Serie A	25	3	8	3	10	1	—		43	7
Gençlerbirliği	2022–23	TFF First League	12	1	0	0	—		—		12	1
Emelec	2023	Serie A	14	5	—		0	0	—		14	5
Emelec	2024	Serie A	25	4	1	0	—		—		26	4
Emelec	2025	Serie A	27	5	2	0	—		—		29	5
Emelec	Total		66	14	3	0	0	0	—		70	14
Career total			456	149	21	4	29	5	7	5	513	163

=== International ===
As of June 12, 2016

Ecuador national team
Year	Apps	Goals
2010	4	1
2011	13	4
2012	7	3
2013	4	1
2014	2	0
2015	3	0
2016	5	1
Total	38	10

=== International goals ===
#	Date	Venue	Opponent	Score	Final	Competition
1.	September 4, 2010	Estadio Omnilife, Zapopan, Mexico	Mexico	2–1	2–1	Friendly
2.	September 2, 2011	Estadio Olímpico Atahualpa, Quito, Ecuador	Jamaica	1–0	5–2	Friendly
3.	September 6, 2011	Estadio Olímpico Atahualpa, Quito, Ecuador	Costa Rica	2–0	4–0	Friendly
4.	October 7, 2011	Estadio Olímpico Atahualpa, Quito, Ecuador	Venezuela	1–0	2–0	2014 FIFA World Cup qualification
5.	October 12, 2011	Red Bull Arena, Harrison, United States	United States	1–0	1–0	Friendly
6.	February 29, 2012	Estadio George Capwell, Guayaquil, Ecuador	Honduras	1–0	2–0	Friendly
7.	February 29, 2012	Estadio George Capwell, Guayaquil, Ecuador	Honduras	2–0	2–0	Friendly
8.	August 15, 2012	Citi Field, Queens, New York City, United States	Chile	2–0	3–0	Friendly
9.	November 19, 2013	BBVA Compass Stadium, Houston, United States	Honduras	1–0	2–2	Friendly
10.	June 12, 2016	MetLife Stadium, East Rutherford, United States	Haiti	2–0	4–0	Copa América Centenario

== Honours ==
=== Club ===
Emelec

- Serie A Runner-up (2): 2006, 2010

Independiente del Valle

- Copa Sudamericana: 2022

=== Individual ===
Emelec

- 2010 Ecuadorian Serie A: Best Player
- 2010 Ecuadorian Serie A: Top goalscorer
