= Carlos Castro (Ecuadorian footballer) =

Ecuadorian footballer (born 1978)

Personal information
- Full name: Carlos Ernesto Castro Cadena
- Date of birth: 24 September 1978 (age 48)
- Place of birth: Quito, Ecuador
- Position: Centre back

Team information
- Current team: Deportivo Quito (manager)

Senior career*
Years	Team	Apps	(Gls)
1999–2003	Aucas	161	(2)
2004–2007	El Nacional	135	(0)
2008–2009	Barcelona SC	52	(0)
2010	El Nacional	32	(2)
2011–2012	Deportivo Cuenca	71	(3)
2013	Deportivo Quevedo	25	(2)
2014	UIDE		

International career
2005–2008	Ecuador	9	(0)

Managerial career
- 2024–: Deportivo Quito
- * Club domestic league appearances and goals

Carlos Ernesto Castro Cadena (born 24 September 1978) is an Ecuadorian football manager and former player who played as a defender. He is the current manager of Deportivo Quito.

== Club career ==
Castro played his final season for Club Deportivo Quevedo in the Campeonato Ecuatoriano de Fútbol.
