= Jimmy Bran =

Ecuadorian footballer (born 1979)

Personal information
- Full name: Jimmy Alfredo Bran Orozco
- Date of birth: July 15, 1979 (age 47)
- Place of birth: Guayaquil, Guayas, Ecuador
- Height: 1.82 m (6 ft 0 in)
- Position: Midfielder

Senior career*
Years	Team	Apps	(Gls)
1996–1998	Rocafuerte		
1998	Emelec		
1999–2006	El Nacional	92	
2006	Manta	15	
2007	Deportivo Azogues	39	
2008	Deportivo Cuenca	17	
2009	Emelec		
2010	Olmedo		
2011	Independiente del Valle		
2012	Técnico Universitario		
2012–	Rocafuerte		

International career
2007	Ecuador	1	(0)
- * Club domestic league appearances and goals

Jimmy Alfredo Bran Orozco (born July 15, 1979) is an Ecuadorian footballer who plays as a midfielder for the top-level Ecuadorian club Rocafuerte.

== Playing style ==
Bran is a defensive midfielder, that covers a lot of terrain on the pitch, being very fast and using tackles and marking. Once he recuperates the ball, he tends to pass it very quickly to his nearest teammate.

Although he is mainly a defensive midfielder, he can play in several positions in the back specially as wingback in both sides of the pitch.

== Career ==
He played most of his career in Quito for El Nacional where he was part of the team that took the 2005 and 2006 Ecuadorian championship, although he was mainly a substitute player. Then he was released and had a short spell in Ecuador's Serie B playing for Manta F.C., the next year he returned to the first division with the then newly promoted Deportivo Azogues where he had a terrific year and was called up to defend the Ecuador National team several times. In 2008 he was transferred to Deportivo Cuenca and, due to a financial crisis, the club had to release him; he was quickly picked up by former youth team and Ecuadorian, Emelec.
