= Erik de Jesús =

Ecuadorian footballer (born 1982)

Personal information
- Full name: Erick Rolando De Jesús Delgado
- Date of birth: 8 November 1982 (age 43)
- Place of birth: Ibarra, Imbabura, Ecuador
- Position: Right back

Team information
- Current team: Valle del Chota

Youth career
- 2001–2003: El Nacional U-19

Senior career*
Years	Team	Apps	(Gls)
2003–2010	El Nacional	218	(8)
2011	Independiente José Terán	16	(0)
2011	Valle del Chota	5	(0)

International career^{‡}
2004–2008	Ecuador	10	
- * Club domestic league appearances and goals as of 30 October 2008 ‡ National team caps and goals as of 30 October 2008

Erik Rolando de Jesús Delgado (born November 8, 1982) is an Ecuadorian footballer currently playing for Valle del Chota. He is a regular starter and plays as a right back for his club.

== Club career ==
De Jesús started at Nacional when he was young. He has spent all his career at Nacional. He won many titles with the juveniles during his time. In 2003, he was promoted to the first team of his club. However, in 2005-2006 he was a champion with El Nacional as they won the clausura of the Ecuadorian league. His good displays of defending earned him a chance to play with the national team in 2006.

== International career ==
De Jesús played in the 3-1 friendly win for Ecuador against Haiti in March 2008.
