= Sergio Torales =

Paraguayan footballer (born 1982)

Sergio Martín Torales Coronel (born 11 April 1982) is a Paraguayan former professional footballer who played as a centre-back. With Sportivo Trinidense, he achieved promotion to the Paraguayan Primera División, captaining the team as it finished the 2006 season in second place.

== Teams ==
- (Paraguay) Presidentes Hayes 2000–2003
- (Paraguay) General Caballero 2004
- (Paraguay) Sportivo Trinidense 2004–2007
- (Paraguay) 2 de Mayo 2008
- (Peru) Sport Huancayo 2009
- (Mexico) Toros Neza 2010
- (Paraguay) Sportivo Trinidense 2011
- (Argentina) Racing de Córdoba 2011
- (Paraguay) General Caballero 2012
- (Paraguay) Sportivo Trinidense 2017
