= 2006 Campeonato Ecuatoriano de Fútbol Serie A =

Copa Pílsener Serie A
- Season: 2006
- Champions: El Nacional (13th title)
- Relegated: ESPOLI; Aucas
- Copa Libertadores: El Nacional; Emelec; LDU Quito
- Copa Sudamericana: 2006: LDU Quito; 2007: El Nacional
- Matches played: 210
- Goals scored: 587 (2.8 per match)
- Top goalscorer: Luis Miguel Escalada (29 goals)

The 2006 Campeonato Ecuatoriano de Fútbol de la Serie A (known as the 2006 Copa Pílsener Serie A for sponsorship reasons) was the 48th season of Ecuador's Serie A, the country's top football tournament for the country's top league. El Nacional won their 13th title to tie Barcelona for the most top-flight championships in Ecuadorian football history.

== Format ==
The Serie A returned to its year-long format this season. The tournament was composed of three stages.

The First Stage and Second Stage are identical. The ten teams competed in a double round-robin tournament, one game at home and one away. The top three teams in each stage qualified to the Liguilla Final with bonus points (3, 2, and 1 point[s], respectively). The winner of each group also qualified to the 2006 and 2007 Copa Sudamericana, respectively. At the end of each, the team with the fewest points was relegated to the Serie B.

The Liguilla Final was a double round-robin tournament between the six qualified teams of the First and Second Stage. The winner of the Liguilla Final was crowned the Serie A champion. The champion and runner-up also qualified to the 2008 Copa Libertadores into the Second Stage, while the third-place finisher qualified to the First Stage.

== First stage ==
Pos	Team	Pld	W	D	L	GF	GA	GD	Pts	Qualification or relegation
1	LDU Quito	18	11	3	4	37	24	+13	36	2006 Copa Sudamericana Preliminary Round & the Liguilla Final
2	El Nacional	18	9	4	5	35	26	+9	31	Qualified to the Liguilla Final
3	Olmedo	18	9	2	7	19	21	−2	29	Qualified to the Liguilla Final
4	Emelec	18	8	4	6	30	21	+9	28	
5	Deportivo Quito	18	7	4	7	22	23	−1	25	
6	Barcelona	18	8	0	10	26	24	+2	24	
7	Aucas	18	6	4	8	25	35	−10	22	
8	Deportivo Cuenca	18	7	0	11	18	26	−8	21	
9	Macará	18	6	3	9	17	28	−11	21	
10	ESPOLI	18	4	6	8	31	32	−1	18	Relegation to Serie B

Source: RSSSF
Rules for classification: 1) points; 2) goal difference; 3) number of goals scored.

== Second stage ==
Pos	Team	Pld	W	D	L	GF	GA	GD	Pts	Qualification or relegation
1	El Nacional	18	8	7	3	31	16	+15	31	2007 Copa Sudamericana Preliminary Round & the Liguilla Final
2	Emelec	18	8	7	3	29	21	+8	31	Qualified to the Liguilla Final
3	Barcelona	18	9	4	5	27	20	+7	31	Qualified to the Liguilla Final
4	Olmedo	18	8	7	3	24	18	+6	31	
5	Deportivo Quito	18	6	4	8	21	25	−4	22	
6	LDU Quito	18	6	3	9	21	32	−11	21	
7	Deportivo Cuenca	18	4	8	6	16	14	+2	20	
8	Macará	18	5	5	8	28	29	−1	20	
9	Deportivo Azogues	18	5	4	9	16	28	−12	19	
10	Aucas	18	5	3	10	23	35	−12	18	Relegation to Serie B

Source: RSSSF
Rules for classification: 1) points; 2) goal difference; 3) number of goals scored.

== Aggregate table ==
Pos	Team	Pld	W	D	L	GF	GA	GD	Pts
1	El Nacional	36	17	11	8	66	42	+24	62
2	Olmedo	36	17	9	10	43	39	+4	60
3	Emelec	36	16	11	9	59	40	+19	59
4	LDU Quito	36	17	6	13	58	56	+2	57
5	Barcelona	36	17	4	15	53	44	+9	55
6	Deportivo Quito	36	13	8	15	43	48	−5	47
7	Deportivo Cuenca	36	11	8	17	34	40	−6	41
8	Macará	36	11	8	17	45	57	−12	41
9	Aucas	36	11	7	18	48	70	−22	40
10	Deportivo Azogues	18	5	4	9	16	28	−12	19
11	ESPOLI	18	4	6	8	31	32	−1	18

Source: RSSSF
Rules for classification: 1) points; 2) goal difference; 3) number of goals scored.

== Liguilla Final ==
Pos	Team	Pld	W	D	L	GF	GA	GD	BP	Pts	Qualification
1	El Nacional (C)	10	3	5	2	16	11	+5	5	19	2007 Copa Libertadores Second Stage
2	Emelec	10	4	3	3	20	17	+3	2	17	2007 Copa Libertadores Second Stage
3	LDU Quito	10	3	4	3	17	13	+4	3	16	2007 Copa Libertadores First Stage
4	Olmedo	10	3	5	2	14	12	+2	1	15	
5	Barcelona	10	3	4	3	10	15	−5	1	14	
6	Deportivo Quito	10	3	1	6	14	23	−9	0	10	

Source: RSSSF
Rules for classification: 1) points; 2) goal difference; 3) number of goals scored. Include Bonus Points earned in the previous rounds.
(C) Champions

Copa Pílsener Serie A
2006 champion
El Nacional
13th title

== See also ==
- Serie A de Ecuador
- 2006 Copa Libertadores
- 2006 Copa Sudamericana
- Federación Ecuatoriana de Fútbol
