= Club Deportivo Quevedo =

Ecuadorian football club

Deportivo Quevedo
- Full name: Club Social, Cultural, y Deportivo Quevedo
- Nicknames: Los Montubios; El ídolo de Los Ríos (The Los Ríos Idol); El ídolo de Quevedo (The Quevedo Idol); Los Rojiazules (The Red-and-Blues)
- Founded: June 15, 1952; 73 years ago
- Ground: Estadio 7 de Octubre
- Capacity: 15,200
- Chairman: Ramón Terreros
- Manager: José Mora
- League: Serie B
- 2013: Serie A, 11th (relegated)
| Home colours | Away colours |

Club Deportivo Quevedo is an Ecuadorian professional football club based in Quevedo. They currently play in the Ecuadorian Serie B, the country's second division-flight professional league.

== Current squad ==
Note: Flags indicate national team as defined under FIFA eligibility rules; some limited exceptions apply. Players may hold more than one non-FIFA nationality.

| No. | Pos. | Nation | Player |
|---|---|---|---|
| 1 | GK | ECU | Edwin Villafuerte |
| 2 | DF | ECU | Kevin Cherrez |
| 3 | DF | ECU | Carlos Ernesto Castro |
| 5 | MF | ECU | Franklin Quiñonez |
| 6 | DF | ECU | Raúl Quijije |
| 7 | MF | PAR | Luis Carlos Espínola |
| 8 | MF | ECU | Walter Zea |
| 9 | FW | ECU | Luis Macias |
| 10 | MF | ECU | Jhon Antonio García |
| 11 | MF | ECU | Patricio Quiñonez |
| 12 | GK | ECU | Claudio Castillo |
| 13 | DF | ECU | Edwin Manolo Hurtado |

| No. | Pos. | Nation | Player |
|---|---|---|---|
| 14 | MF | ECU | Miguel Mesias |
| 15 | MF | ECU | Adrian Vera |
| 16 | DF | ECU | Fabricio Bagui |
| 17 | FW | ECU | Tito Valencia |
| 22 | GK | ECU | Héctor Rolando Carabalí |
| 23 | MF | ECU | Juan Carlos Godoy |
| 24 | MF | ECU | Armando Paredes |
| 25 | GK | ECU | Geovanny Camacho |
| 27 | DF | ECU | Jose Luis Cortez |
| 28 | DF | ECU | Marvin Corozo |
| 29 | FW | PAR | Cristian Hermosillo |

== Managers ==
- (Paraguay) Raúl Duarte (Jan 1, 2012 – July 22, 2013)
- (Argentina) Juan Urquiza (July 22, 2013 – Sept 25, 2013)
- (Ecuador) José Mora (Sept 25, 2013 – present)
