= Luis Macias (Ecuadorian footballer) =

Ecuadorian footballer (born 1985)

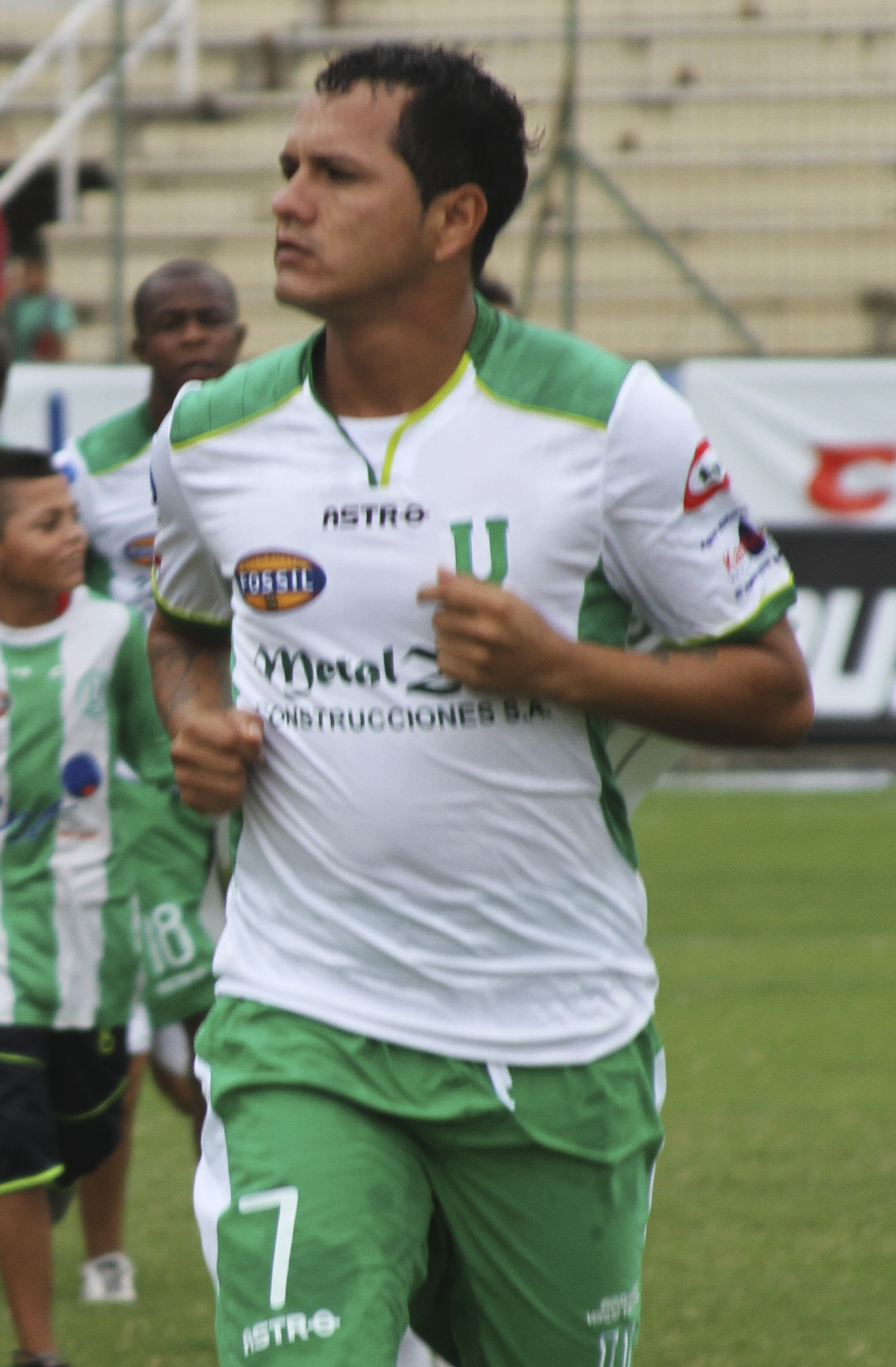

Personal information
- Full name: Luis Miguel Macias Espinoza
- Date of birth: 1 April 1985 (age 41)
- Place of birth: Portoviejo, Ecuador
- Position: Attacking midfielder

Team information
- Current team: El Nacional
- Number: 7

Youth career
- 2001 – 2005: LDU Portoviejo

Senior career*
| Years | Team | Apps | (Gls) |
| 2005–2009 | LDU Portoviejo | 130 | (?) |
| 2010 | Barcelona | 6 | (1) |
| 2010 | River Plate | | |
| 2011 | Barcelona | | |
| 2011 | Aucas | | |
| 2011 | Deportivo Quevedo | | |
| 2012 | LDU Portoviejo | | |
| 2013 | Deportivo Quevedo | | |
| 2013 | LDU Portoviejo | | |
| 2016 | Colon | | |
- * Club domestic league appearances and goals as of 12 July 2010

Luis Miguel Macias Espinoza (born 1 April 1985, in Portoviejo), sometimes known as Cocacho, is an Ecuadorian football forward. He currently plays for LDU Portoviejo.

== Club career ==
Macias began his professional football career with LDU Portoviejo. For the 2010 season, he will be playing for the Ecuadorian giants Barcelona SC.

Macias scored his first goal with Barcelona on 21 February 2010, in a match against Independiente José Terán.
