= Ángel Pután =

Ecuadorian footballer (born 1986)

Personal information
- Full name: Ángel Enrique Pután Sandoval
- Date of birth: June 20, 1986 (age 40)
- Place of birth: Machala, Ecuador
- Position: Forward

Team information
- Current team: UTC

Youth career
- 2002–2007: LDU Quito

Senior career*
Years	Team	Apps	(Gls)
2005	LDU Quito	19	(0)
2008	LDU Loja	37	(9)
2009–2010	Olmedo	49	(3)
2011	Técnico Universitario	33	(6)
2012	Olmedo	4	(0)
2012	River Plate Ecuador	16	(1)
2013	Fuerza Amarilla	18	(2)
2014	Macará	10	(0)
2015	Manta	10	(0)
2016–	UTC	32	(19)
- * Club domestic league appearances and goals as of June 28, 2017

Ángel Enrique Pután Sandoval (born June 20, 1986) is an Ecuadorian footballer currently playing for UTC.
