= Moisés Candelario =

Ecuadorian footballer (born 1978)

Personal information
- Full name: Moisés Antonio Candelario Díaz
- Date of birth: October 10, 1978 (age 48)
- Place of birth: Guayaquil, Ecuador
- Height: 1.78 m (5 ft 10 in)
- Position: Defensive midfielder

Senior career*
Years	Team	Apps	(Gls)
1995–2005	Emelec	277	(58)
2006	LDU Quito	21	(3)
2007	Barcelona SC	3	(0)
2008	El Nacional	19	(3)
2009	LDU Portoviejo	11	(0)
2010	Audaz Octubrino	23	(23)
2011–2013	Bolívar	28	(6)

International career^{‡}
1999–2004	Ecuador	8	(0)
- * Club domestic league appearances and goals as of April 13, 2013 ‡ National team caps and goals as of 1 January 2008

Moisés Antonio Candelario (born 10 October 1978 in Guayaquil) is a retired international football player from Ecuador. He played as a defensive midfielder.

== Club career ==
Candelario played most of his career for Emelec. Since 2006 he has played for a number of other teams in Ecuador.
