= To Catch a Cheater =

- Genre: "Reality"; Comedy
- Created by: Sameer Bhavnani
- Directed by: Sameer Bhavnani (2016–present)
- Presented by: Luis Mercado (2016–present), Sameer Bhavnani (2016–present)
- Country of origin: United States
- Original language: English
- No. of episodes: 188

Original release
- Network: YouTube
- Release: May 31, 2015

To Catch a Cheater is a scripted American web series published on YouTube. With over 3 million subscribers, the web series supposedly follows people suspected of committing adultery, or cheating, on their partners. Actors have repeatedly come out in interviews and videos admitting the series is completely scripted, a claim producer Sameer Bhavnani states is not true and that the show features real couples and those claiming are actors are couples who "have changed their mind and regret being on the show".

== Development and production ==
To Catch a Cheater aired on May 2, 2016, on YouTube. The show is produced and created by Sameer Bhavnani and the format and execution is custom tailored for the YouTube platform and audiences. Investigations were headed by Sameer Bhavnani and Luis Mercado. The web series featured complainants married or long-term significant others, and have included both opposite-sex and same-sex couples. Each episode begins with Mercado asking his viewers to visit his sponsors, a brief interview of the complainant, detailing how the complainant met their partner and what has led them to believe that the partner is cheating, explaining suspicious activities or behavior.

== Notable episodes ==
- A guy gets offered oral sex by a stranger as his girlfriend secretly watches the whole thing.
- A girlfriend's man actually had sex with the accomplice (banned episode).

== See also ==
Other concepts and entities based on the premise of baiting misconduct:

- Bait car, a police tactic to catch potential car thieves
- To Catch a Predator, a TV show that tries to bait potential child predators
- Scam baiting, which baits con artists
