= Luis Preti =

Ecuadorian footballer (born 1983)

Personal information
- Full name: Luis Humberto Preti Maldonado
- Date of birth: January 2, 1983 (age 43)
- Place of birth: Quito, Ecuador
- Position: Goalkeeper

Youth career
- 1997–2003: LDU Quito

Senior career*
Years	Team	Apps	(Gls)
2002–2008	LDU Quito	11	(0)
2008–2011	Universidad Católica	66	(0)
Total		77	(0)
- * Club domestic league appearances and goals as of November 26, 2011

Luis Humberto Preti Maldonado (born January 2, 1983) is a retired Ecuadorian football goalkeeper.

== Club career ==
He has spent the majority of his career at LDU Quito as a product of its youth system. Although he began making senior squad appearances in 2002, he saw little playing time as a back-up goalie. He was the second back-up for the squad when it won the 2008 Copa Libertadores. Following the Copa Libertadores, he was traded to another Quito club, Universidad Católica, who at the time were in the top-tier Serie A. He did not see playing time again in 2008. In 2009, he became the starting goalkeeper for the club, which had been relegated from the previous season.

== Honors ==
LDU Quito

- Serie A: 2003, 2005 Apertura, 2007
- Copa Libertadores: 2008
