= Arlín Ayoví =

Ecuadorian footballer (born 1979)

Personal information
- Full name: Arlín Segundo Ayoví Ayoví
- Date of birth: 6 May 1979 (age 47)
- Place of birth: Ecuador
- Height: 1.87 m (6 ft 2 in)
- Position: Defender

Senior career*
Years	Team	Apps	(Gls)
1997–2001	Barcelona	76	(3)
2003–2006	Olmedo	130	(4)
2007	LDU Quito	26	(1)
2008	Deportivo Cuenca	22	(0)
2009	Olmedo	17	(0)
2010	Deportivo Cuenca	17	(1)
2011	Independiente del Valle	19	(0)
2012	Técnico Universitario	11	(0)
2013	Manta	12	(0)
Total		330	(9)

International career
2001	Ecuador		
- * Club domestic league appearances and goals as of August 23, 2013

Arlín Segundo Ayoví Ayoví (born 6 May 1979) is a retired Ecuadorian footballer.

== Honors ==
LDU Quito

- Serie A: 2007
