= Diego Ceballos =

Argentine footballer (born 1980)

Personal information
- Full name: Diego Marcelo Ceballos
- Date of birth: 25 March 1980 (age 46)
- Place of birth: Santa Fe, Argentina
- Height: 1.86 m (6 ft 1 in)
- Position: Forward

Senior career*
Years	Team	Apps	(Gls)
1999–2001	Platense	26	(7)
2001–2002	Gimnasia y Esgrima	44	(26)
2002–2003	Nueva Chicago	30	(10)
2003–2004	Quilmes	34	(6)
2004–2005	Banfield	33	(6)
2005	Lanús	13	(1)
2006	L.D.U. Quito	8	(3)
2006–2007	Talleres de Córdoba	36	(16)
2007–2008	Quilmes	32	(9)
2008–2009	San Martín	24	(6)
2009–2010	Platense	24	(6)
2010–2011	Deportivo Merlo	32	(8)
2011	Lobos BUAP	15	(4)
2012–2014	Almirante Brown	40	(2)
2014	Brown	8	(1)
2015–2016	Deportivo Camioneros	11	(2)
2016	Deportivo Laferrere	4	(0)
Total		414	(113)
- * Club domestic league appearances and goals

Diego Marcelo Ceballos (born 25 March 1980) is an Argentine former professional footballer who played as a forward.
