= Juan Guerrón =

Ecuadorian footballer (born 1983)

Personal information
- Full name: Juan Kely Guerrón Vasquez
- Date of birth: 21 October 1983 (age 43)
- Place of birth: Chota, Ecuador
- Position: Wing back

Team information
- Current team: Deportivo Quito
- Number: 19

Senior career*
Years	Team	Apps	(Gls)
2002–2003	ESPOLI	33	(2)
2004	El Nacional	9	(0)
2005–2006	LDU Quito	15	(1)
2007	Macará	9	(0)
2008	Olmedo	16	(0)
2009–2010	Deportivo Cuenca	48	(1)
2011	LDU Loja	10	(0)
2012	Valle del Chota	27	(2)
2013–2014	Imbabura SC	41	(2)
2015–	Deportivo Quito	64	(0)
- * Club domestic league appearances and goals as of 30 June 2012

Juan Kely Guerrón Vasquez (born 21 October 1983) is an Ecuadorian footballer currently playing for Deportivo Quito in the Ecuadorian Segunda Categoría.

== Club career ==
Guerrón started playing football professionally with ESPOLI in 2002. He played 33 games for them but did not score any goals. In 2004, he was signed by El Nacional, where he did not play many games. He managed to play 9 games in total for Nacional.

After an unsuccessful season with the military club, he signed for nearby city rivals, LDU Quito. Guerrón played more games for Liga than he did for Nacional but he still was limited for the bench. After Liga, he played for Macará, Olmedo, and Deportivo Cuenca. In Cuenca, he scored his first goal in a 3–4 win against El Nacional.

== Personal life ==
Guerron is the half-brother of Raúl Guerrón and Copa Libertadores 2008 best player and champion Joffre Guerrón, who has represented Ecuador national football team.
