= Luis Miguel Escalada =

Argentine footballer

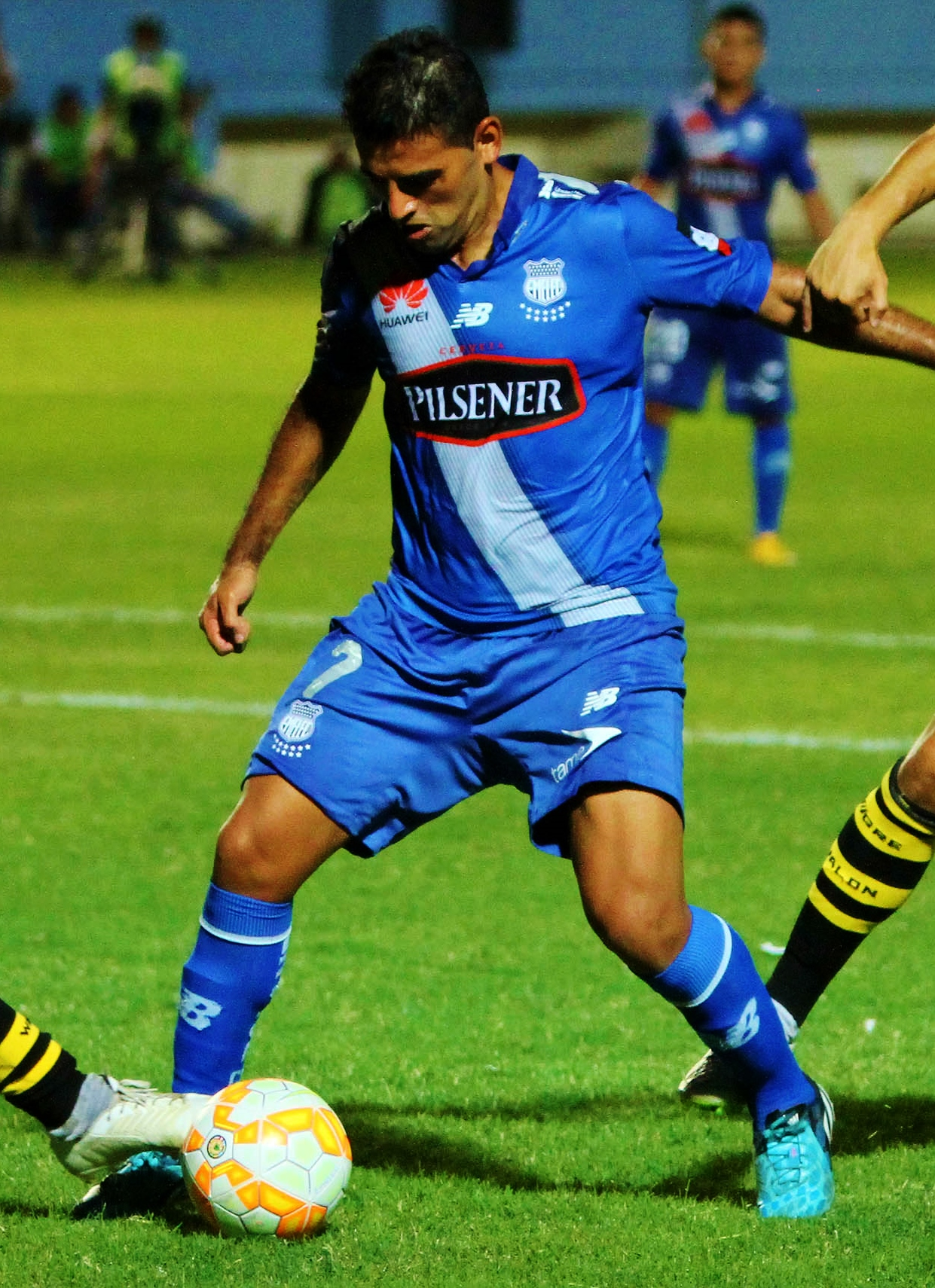
- Luis Miguel Escalada with Emelec in February 2015

Personal information
- Full name: Luis Miguel Escalada
- Date of birth: 27 February 1986 (age 40)
- Place of birth: Ceres, Argentina
- Height: 5 ft 9 in (1.75 m)
- Position: Forward

Team information
- Current team: Aucas
- Number: 22

Youth career
- 2002–2004: Boca Juniors

Senior career*
Years	Team	Apps	(Gls)
2004–2010	Boca Juniors	6	(0)
2006	Emelec	40	(29)
2007–2010	LDU Quito	38	(16)
2008	→ Botafogo (loan)	2	(0)
2008	→ Gimnasia de Jujuy (loan)	11	(2)
2008–2009	→ Newell's Old Boys (loan)	0	(0)
2009	→ Real Salt Lake (loan)	5	(1)
2010–2011	Deportivo Cuenca	40	(16)
2011	Sporting Cristal	7	(2)
2011–2012	Manta	19	(8)
2012	Deportivo Quito	10	(3)
2012–2013	Deportivo Táchira	12	(4)
2013–2014	Manta	42	(10)
2014–2015	Emelec	54	(12)
2016–2019	Universidad Católica	72	(17)
2019	Deportivo Cuenca	27	(5)
2020–	Aucas	8	(2)
- * Club domestic league appearances and goals as of 21:28, 1 December 2020 (UTC)

Luis Miguel Escalada (born 27 February 1986) is an Argentine professional footballer who plays as a forward for S.D. Aucas.

== Career ==
Escalada was born in Ceres. He has previously played for Boca Juniors, Gimnasia de Jujuy and Newell's Old Boys in Argentina, Emelec and LDU Quito in Ecuador, and Botafogo in Brazil.

Escalada signed with Major League Soccer side Real Salt Lake in early 2009 and made his MLS debut on 18 April 2009 as a substitute in a game against the New York Red Bulls. He scored his first goal on 25 April 2009 in a 6–0 win over New England Revolution.

== Career statistics ==
As of 13 March 2016

Club	Season	League		State League		Cup		Continental		Total	
Club	Season	Apps	Goals	Apps	Goals	Apps	Goals	Apps	Goals	Apps	Goals
Boca Juniors	2004-05	6	0	–		0	0	1	0	7	0
Emelec	2006	40	29	–		–		0	0	40	29
LDU Quito	2007	38	16	–		–		6	0	44	16
Botafogo	2008	0	0	2	0	0	0	0	0	2	0
Gimnasia de Jujuy	2007-08	11	2	–		0	0	0	0	11	2
Newell's Old Boys	2008-09	0	0	–		0	0	0	0	0	0
Real Salt Lake	2009	5	1	–		0	0	0	0	5	1
Deportivo Cuenca	2010	40	16	–		–		6	2	46	18
Sporting Cristal	2011	7	2	–		0	0	0	0	7	2
Manta	2011	19	8	–		–		0	0	19	8
Deportivo Quito	2012	10	3	–		–		2	0	12	3
Deportivo Táchira	2012-13	12	4	–		0	0	2	0	14	4
Manta	2013	42	10	–		–		0	0	42	10
Emelec	2014	27	5	–		–		8	4	35	9
Emelec	2015	27	7	–		–		10	1	37	8
Emelec	Total	54	12	—		—		18	5	72	17
Universidad Católica	2016	40	14	–		–		2	0	42	14
Universidad Católica	2017	5	1	–		–		0	0	5	1
Universidad Católica	Total	45	15	—		—		2	0	47	15
Career total		329	118	2	0	0	0	37	7	368	125

== Honors ==
=== Club ===
LDU Quito

- Serie A: 2007

Real Salt Lake

- MLS: 2009

Emelec

- Serie A: 2014

=== Individual ===
Emelec

- 2006 Ecuadorian Serie A: top scorer
