= Germán Castillo =

Argentine footballer

Personal information
- Full name: Germán Pablo Castillo
- Date of birth: 19 October 1977 (age 49)
- Place of birth: El Trébol, Argentina
- Height: 1.79 m (5 ft 10 in)
- Position: Midfielder

Team information
- Current team: Cerro Porteño

Senior career*
Years	Team	Apps	(Gls)
1998–2001	Unión	70	(13)
1999	→Lanús (loan)	1	(0)
2001–2004	Gimnasia (LP)	73	(5)
2005	Unión	?	(?)
2005	Juventud Antoniana	?	(?)
2006	Olmedo	13	(0)
2007–2008	Cuenca	48	(2)
2008	Huracán	7	(0)
2009–	Cerro Porteño	0	(0)
- * Club domestic league appearances and goals as of 23 January 2009

Germán Pablo Castillo (born 19 October 1977 in El Trébol) is an Argentine footballer who plays for Cerro Porteño in Paraguay.
