= Gonçalo Cardoso (footballer, born 1990) =

Portuguese footballer

Gonçalo
Personal information
- Full name: Pedro Gonçalo Gonçalves Mesquita Cardoso
- Date of birth: 28 December 1990 (age 35)
- Place of birth: Guimarães, Portugal
- Height: 1.75 m (5 ft 9 in)
- Position: Defender

Team information
- Current team: Leça FC
- Number: 20

Youth career
- 2001–2009: Vitória S.C.

Senior career*
Years	Team	Apps	(Gls)
2009–2011	Vitória S.C.	0	(0)
2009–2010	→ Maria da Fonte (loan)		
2010	→ Vizela (loan)		
2011	→ Limianos (loan)		
2011–2012	Tourizense	27	(0)
2012–2014	Vitória S.C. B	21	(0)
2013	Vitória S.C.	1	(0)
2014–2017	Bragança	49	(5)
2017–2018	Gafanha	27	(1)
2018–	Espinho	42	(0)
- * Club domestic league appearances and goals as of 23:04, 10 December 2019 (UTC)

Pedro Gonçalo Gonçalves Mesquita Cardoso (born 28 December 1990), often known simply as Gonçalo, is a Portuguese footballer who plays for Leça FC.

== Club career ==
He made his professional debut in the Segunda Liga for Vitória Guimarães B on 18 August 2012 in a game against Sporting B.

He made his Primeira Liga debut for Vitória Guimarães on 20 January 2013, when he came on as a late substitute for Luís Rocha in a 3–1 victory over Rio Ave.
