= Club Deportivo Universidad Técnica de Cotopaxi =

Ecuadorian football club

Universidad Técnica de Cotopaxi
- Full name: Club Deportivo Universidad Técnica de Cotopaxi
- Founded: August 8, 2007; 18 years ago
- Ground: Estadio La Cocha
- Capacity: 15,200
- Chairman: Marlon Tinajero
- Manager: Alcides de Oliveira
- League: Serie B
- 2010: 6th
Home colours	Away colours

Club Deportivo Universidad Técnica de Cotopaxi is a professional Ecuadorian football club based in Latacunga. They currently play in the country's second-level football league—the Serie B—after gaining promotion from the third-level Segunda Categoria, which they won in 2009.

== Achievements ==
- Campeonato de Segunda
  - Winner (1): 2009
