= Pedro Cardoso (footballer) =

Uruguayan association football player

Personal information
- Full name: José Pedro Cardoso
- Date of birth: 14 July 1975 (age 51)
- Place of birth: Rocha, Uruguay
- Position: Forward

Senior career*
Years	Team	Apps	(Gls)
2000–2006	Rocha		
2006–2007	Peñarol		
2007	Rocha		
2007–2008	River Plate UY		
2008–2010	Rocha		
- * Club domestic league appearances and goals

José Pedro Cardoso (born 14 July 1975) is a Uruguayan former footballer who played as a forward. He helped Rocha to the Apertura title in the Uruguayan Primera División in 2005–06, finishing the season as top scorer with 17 goals. He also represented Peñarol and River Plate Montevideo in the top flight, with less success. He was called up to the Uruguay national football team in 2006, but withdrew through injury.

== Club career ==
=== Rocha ===
Born in Rocha, Cardoso spent his early career in amateur football, broken cruciate ligaments since the age of 15 and missing two years of play at Huracán Buceo from 1997. He signed with Rocha F.C. in the Uruguayan Primera División in 2000, and winning an Apertura title with the club in the Uruguayan Segunda División in 2003–04.

In 2005–06 in the Uruguayan Primera División Cardoso was the top scorer with 17 goals, helping his team to the Apertura title before losing overall to Club Nacional de Football 6–1 on aggregate. Rocha qualified for the Copa Libertadores in 2006, with Cardoso scoring their first continental goal on 7 March, opening a 3–2 win at L.D.U. Quito in which he scored twice.

Cardoso's performances for Rocha resulted in interests from other clubs. He received a million-dollar offer from a Japanese club managed by a Spaniard, but it fell through due to third parties; approaches from Ecuador after playing well there in the Copa Libertadores also collapsed. He once rejected a move to Boca Juniors of Argentina because he would have missed his mother's cooking, and in 2005 he was turned down by Peñarol manager Fernando Morena.

=== Later career ===
In 2006, Cardoso transferred to Peñarol, the club that he and his father supported. The move was not a success, as manager Gregorio Pérez told Cardoso that he wanted a taller centre-forward, and therefore played him sparingly. After being unused completely in a crucial game against Danubio F.C. he chose to return to Rocha.

After his spell in Montevideo, Cardoso returned to his hometown club, and reflected in 2022 that this was the point when alcohol began to affect his career. He went back to the capital city to play for River Plate F.C. where he scored one goal in the Apertura stage of 2007–08, then concluded his career back in his native Rocha Department.

== International career ==
Cardoso was called up to the Uruguay national football team in April 2006 for a friendly tour of the United States, Europe and Africa, at the start of Óscar Tabárez's second tenure as manager. Training twice a day, 31-year-old Cardoso withdrew on the sixth day of the training camp due to a flare-up of his chronic ligament injury.

== Personal life ==
Cardoso had four children, all daughters. As of 2022, he worked with one of his daughters and her husband, selling hamburgers in Rocha. He was also painting houses and mowing lawns.

== Honours ==
Rocha

- Uruguayan Primera División: 2005–06 (Apertura)
- Uruguayan Segunda División: 2003–04 (Apertura)

Individual

- Uruguayan Primera División top scorer: 2005–06
