= Jorge Ladines =

Ecuadorian footballer (born 1986)

Personal information
- Full name: Jorge Washington Ladines Garcés
- Date of birth: September 21, 1986 (age 40)
- Place of birth: Guayaquil, Ecuador
- Height: 1.65 m (5 ft 5 in)
- Position: Winger

Senior career*
Years	Team	Apps	(Gls)
2005–2008	Emelec	95	(21)
2009–2010	El Nacional	14	(4)
2010	Deportivo Cuenca	10	(1)
2011	LDE Guayaquil	4	(0)
2012	Barcelona	0	(0)

International career^{‡}
2006–present	Ecuador	1	(0)
- * Club domestic league appearances and goals as of 28 February 2008 ‡ National team caps and goals as of 28 February 2008

Jorge Washington Ladines Garcés (born September 21, 1986) is an Ecuadorian footballer. He currently plays for Barcelona Sporting Club in the Campeonato Ecuatoriano de Fútbol.

== Club career ==
He has played for multiple club teams, including Emelec Guayaquil, El Nacional Quito, and Patria Guayaquil.

== International career ==
He received his first international call up for Ecuador for a September 2007 friendly against El Salvador, which Ecuador won 5–1. He also was included in the squad that began the 2010 World Cup qualifying campaign.
