= Pedro Galván (footballer) =

Argentine footballer

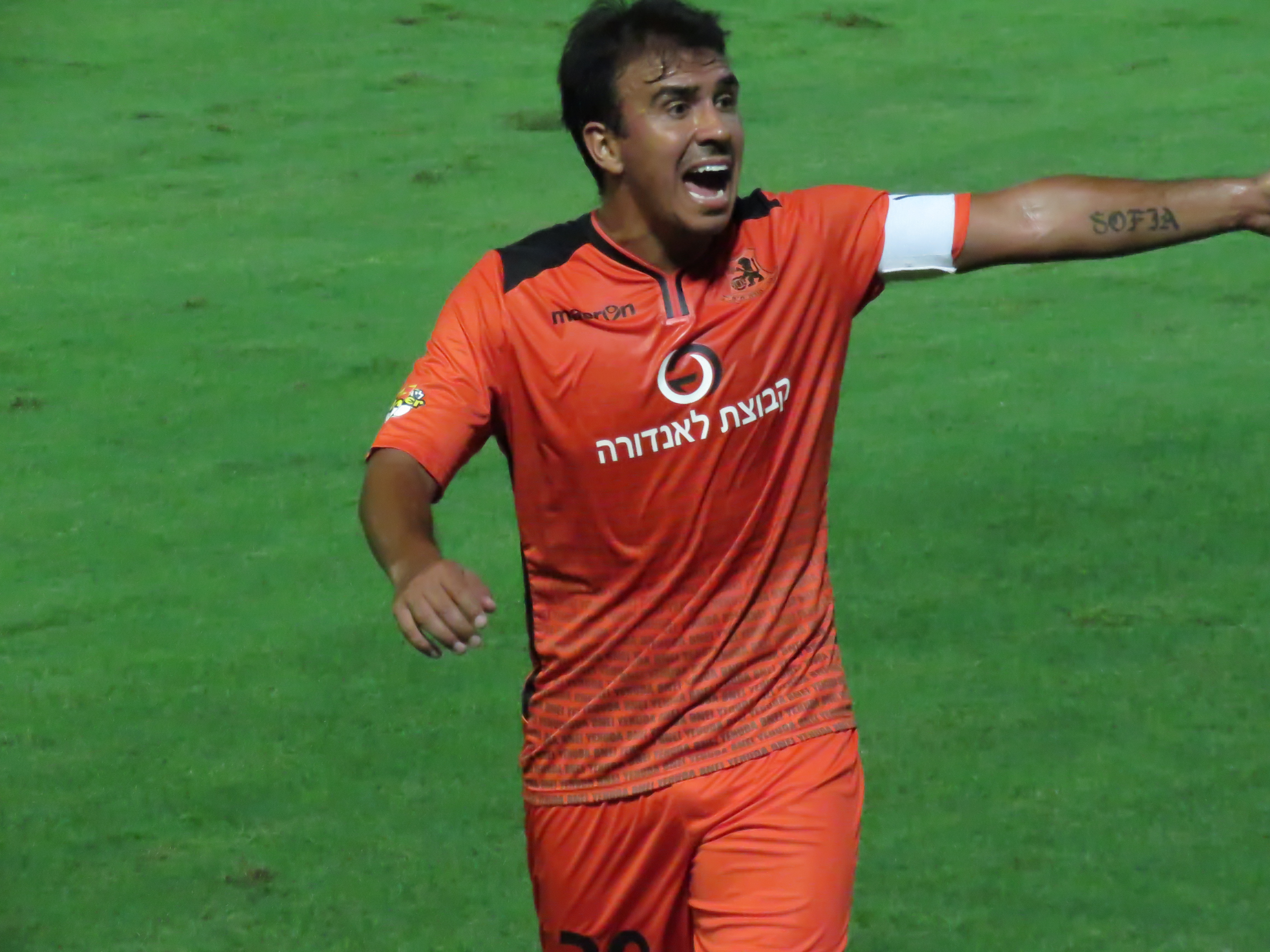
- Galván playing for Bnei Yehuda in 2015

Personal information
- Full name: Pedro Joaquín Galván
- Date of birth: 18 August 1985 (age 41)
- Place of birth: Arrecifes, Argentina
- Height: 1.84 m (6 ft 0 in)
- Position: Attacking midfielder

Youth career
- Gimnasia LP

Senior career*
Years	Team	Apps	(Gls)
2003–2005	Gimnasia LP	4	(0)
2006	San Martín SJ	18	(2)
2007	Olmedo	41	(14)
2008	San Martín SJ	13	(0)
2008–2013	Bnei Yehuda	158	(65)
2013–2014	Maccabi Petah Tikva	30	(7)
2014–2016	Bnei Yehuda	60	(33)
2016–2017	Hapoel Ashkelon	8	(1)
2017	Bnei Yehuda	15	(2)
2017–2018	Hapoel Tel Aviv	16	(2)
2018	→ Hapoel Marmorek (loan)	17	(6)
2018–2019	Hapoel Rishon LeZion	7	(0)
2019–2020	Olimpo	4	(0)
2021	Ciudad Bolívar		
2021–2024	Balonpie Bolivar		
2025	Ciudad Bolívar	7	(0)
- * Club domestic league appearances and goals as of 14:11, 06 January 2026 (UTC)

Pedro Joaquín Galván (born 18 August 1985) is an Argentine professional footballer who plays as an attacking midfielder. He is currently without a team.

== Career ==
Galván started his career in 2003 with Club de Gimnasia y Esgrima La Plata. In 2005, he joined San Martín de San Juan. He spent 2007 in Ecuador playing for Olmedo before returning to San Martín.

After San Martín were relegated from the Argentine Primera Galván joined Bnei Yehuda. At the end of the 2012–13 season, Galván joined Maccabi Petah Tikva. On 22 February 2014, he scored his 71st goal in the Israeli Premier League, becoming the league's best scoring foreign player in history, beating former Maccabi Haifa star Đovani Roso.

In the summer of 2014, Galván left Israel for French Ligue 2 side Nîmes. In the end he had to return to play in Israel and signed for Bnei Yehuda and played there for two seasons. When Borak Obramov became the owner of the team, Galv'an said that he is going to leave the club on summer.

In 2025, he returned to Ciudad Bolívar where he would have his second stint with the club. He was part of the team that was promoted to the Federal A in 2021.

== Career statistics ==
As of 7 August 2014

Appearances and goals by club, season and competition
Club	Season	League			Cup		Toto Cup		Europe		Total	
Club	Season	Division	Apps	Goals	Apps	Goals	Apps	Goals	Apps	Goals	Apps	Goals
Bnei Yehuda	2008–09	Israeli Premier League	30	10	2	0	7	0	0	0	39	10
Bnei Yehuda	2009–10	Israeli Premier League	28	12	2	1	4	1	8	3	42	17
Bnei Yehuda	2010–11	Israeli Premier League	29	16	1	0	4	1	0	0	34	17
Bnei Yehuda	2011–12	Israeli Premier League	37	16	1	0	3	4	0	0	41	20
Bnei Yehuda	2012–13	Israeli Premier League	34	11	1	0	3	1	4	1	42	13
Bnei Yehuda	Total		158	65	7	1	19	7	12	4	196	77
Maccabi Petah Tikva	2013–14	Israeli Premier League	30	7	4	0	0	0	0	0	34	7
Bnei Yehuda	2014–15	Liga Leumit	31	22	1	1	5	1	0	0	37	24
Career total			219	94	12	2	24	8	12	4	267	108

== Honours ==
Bnei Yehud

- Israel State Cup: 2016–17

Ciudad Bolívar

- Torneo Federal A : 2025
