= Jorge Torales =

Paraguayan footballer (born 1984)

Personal information
- Full name: Jorge Arnaldo Torales
- Date of birth: 1 June 1984 (age 42)
- Place of birth: Asunción, Paraguay
- Height: 1.72 m (5 ft 8 in)
- Position: Forward

Senior career*
Years	Team	Apps	(Gls)
2000–2001	Sportivo Trinidense	10	(1)
2001–2004	Chacarita Juniors	45	(8)
2004	Guaraní Antonio Franco	40	(8)
2005	Tembetary		
2005–2006	Estudiantes BA	11	(4)
2006–2007	Olmedo	46	(17)
2007	Olimpo	10	(3)
2008	Deportivo Cuenca	14	(8)
2009	Emelec	25	(5)
2010	Everton	12	(4)
2010	Independiente del Valle	13	(2)
2011	Nacional Asunción	7	(1)
2011	3 de Febrero	5	(0)
2013	San Jorge	8	(0)
2013–2014	Estudiantes RC	10	(1)
2014	Olimpia Itá		

International career
2001	Paraguay U20		
- * Club domestic league appearances and goals

Jorge Arnaldo Torales (born 1 June 1984) is a Paraguayan former football striker.

== Teams ==
- (Paraguay) Sportivo Trinidense 2000–2001
- (Argentina) Chacarita Juniors 2001–2004
- (Argentina) Guaraní Antonio Franco 2004
- (Paraguay) Tembetary 2005
- (Argentina) Estudiantes de Buenos Aires 2005–2006
- (Ecuador) Olmedo 2006–2007
- (Argentina) Olimpo 2007
- (Ecuador) Deportivo Cuenca 2008
- (Ecuador) Emelec 2009
- (Chile) Everton 2010
- (Ecuador) Independiente del Valle 2010
- (Paraguay) Nacional 2011
- (Paraguay) 3 de Febrero 2011
- (Argentina) San Jorge 2013
- (Argentina) Estudiantes de Río Cuarto 2013–2014
- (Paraguay) Olimpia Itá 2014
