= Juan Triviño =

Ecuadorian footballer (born 1980)

Personal information
- Full name: Juan Ignacio Triviño Burgos
- Date of birth: September 3, 1980 (age 46)
- Place of birth: Guayaquil, Ecuador
- Height: 1.81 m (5 ft 11 in)
- Position: Defender

Team information
- Current team: El Nacional
- Number: 2

Youth career
- 1996–1999: LDE Guayaquil
- 1999–2001: Emelec

Senior career*
Years	Team	Apps	(Gls)
1999–2006	Emelec	202	(8)
2007	Deportivo Quito	43	(1)
2008	Emelec	28	(1)
2009	LDU Portoviejo	33	(0)
2010	Universidad Católica	38	(1)
2011–	El Nacional	3	(0)

International career^{‡}
2004–2005	Ecuador	5	(0)
- * Club domestic league appearances and goals as of December 22, 2009 ‡ National team caps and goals as of February 28, 2008

Juan Ignacio Triviño Burgos (born September 3, 1980) is an Ecuadorian football defender. He is recently signed with El Nacional, and also played for the Ecuador national team between 2004 and 2005.

== Playing style ==
Triviño is an able and accurate center back with adequate heading and passing skills. Some managers have used him as a defensive midfielder rather than his ideal position of center back.

== Honors ==
Emelec

- Serie A: 2001, 2002
