= Armando Paredes =

Ecuadorian footballer (born 1984)

Personal information
- Full name: Armando Paredes
- Date of birth: June 23, 1984 (age 42)
- Place of birth: Guayaquil, Ecuador
- Position: Centre midfielder

Senior career*
Years	Team	Apps	(Gls)
2002–2007	Barcelona SC		
2008	Emelec		
2009	→ Olmedo (loan)		
- * Club domestic league appearances and goals

Armando Paredes (born June 23, 1984, in Guayaquil) is an Ecuadorian football player. He played center midfielder for Barcelona Sporting Club in the Ecuadorian Copa Pilsener 2007.

Paredes was transferred to Barcelona Sporting Club from Club Venezia on July 5, 2002, for an undisclosed amount. In 2008 he played for Club Sport Emelec. He was loaned to Olmedo for the 2009 season.
