= Daniel Neculmán =

Argentine footballer (born 1985)

Daniel Néculman
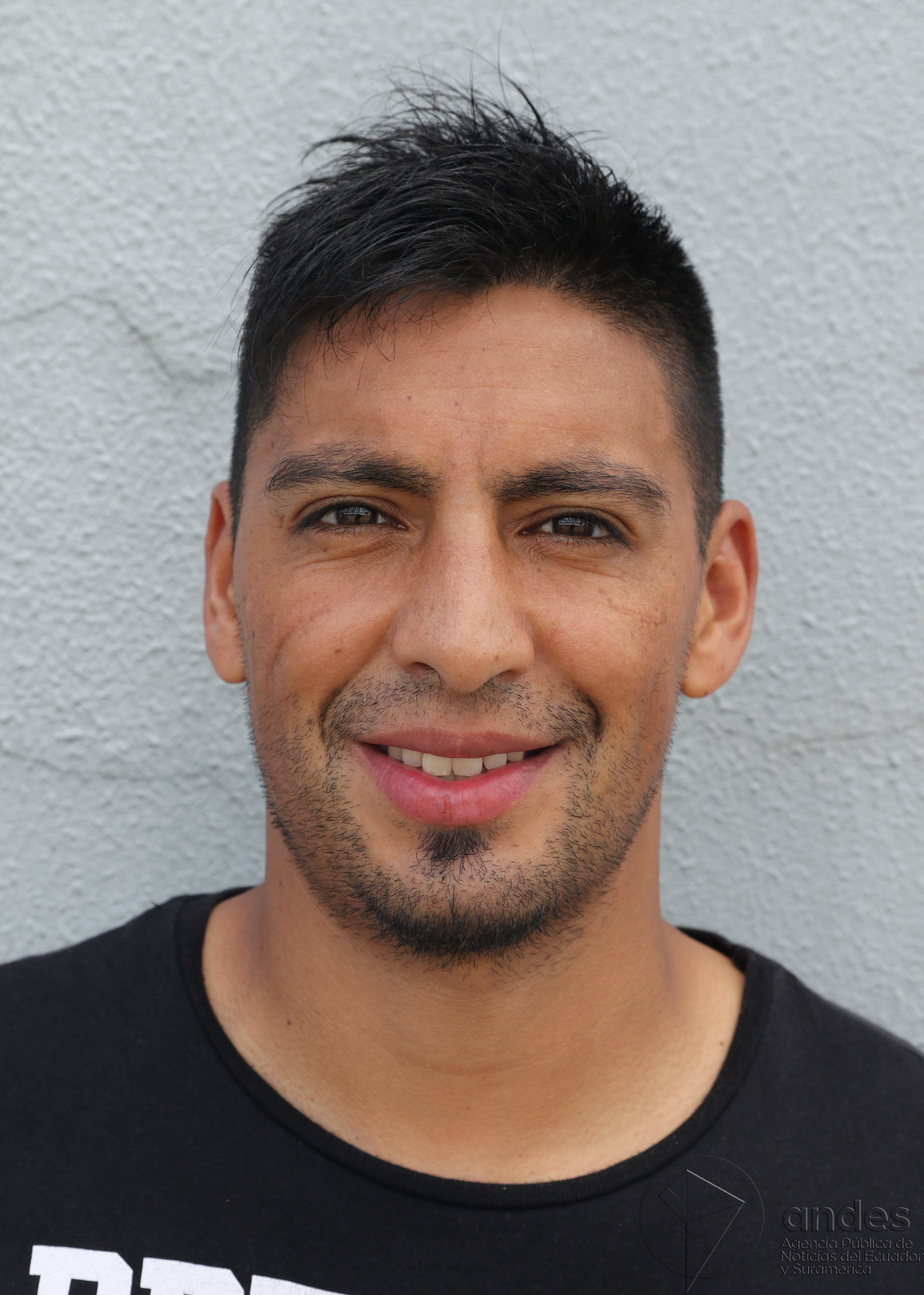
- Néculman with River Plate Ecuador in 2016

Personal information
- Full name: Daniel Alberto Néculman Suárez
- Date of birth: 27 October 1995 (age 31)
- Place of birth: Bariloche, Argentina
- Height: 1.80 m (5 ft 11 in)
- Position: Forward

Youth career
- Deportivo Municipales (Bariloche)

Senior career*
| Years | Team | Apps | (Gls) |
| 2003–2006 | C.A.I. | 14 | (0) |
| 2004–2006 | → Huracán de Comodoro (loan) | 55 | (18) |
| 2006–2007 | Deportivo Madryn | 16 | (9) |
| 2007 | Imbabura | 33 | (16) |
| 2008–2009 | Santa Fe | 32 | (8) |
| 2010 | Deportivo Pereira | 16 | (2) |
| 2010 | Sporting Cristal | 11 | (2) |
| 2011 | Unión Temuco | 20 | (6) |
| 2012 | C.A.I. | 11 | (5) |
| 2012 | Naval | 13 | (4) |
| 2013 | Olmedo | 36 | (29) |
| 2014 | Mérida | 7 | (0) |
| 2014 | LDU Portoviejo | | (7) |
| 2015–2017 | River Plate Ecuador | 90 | (33) |
| 2017 | → Blooming (loan) | 15 | (2) |
| 2018 | LDU Portoviejo | | (14) |
| 2019 | Atlético Porteño | 9 | (2) |
| 2019 | Ferro General Pico | 12 | (4) |
| 2020 | Deportivo Cuenca | 18 | (1) |
| 2021 | Cumbayá | | (4) |

Managerial career
- 2022: Independiente Juniors (assistant)
- 2023: Universidad Católica (assistant)
- 2024: Deportivo Cuenca (assistant)
- 2024: Huachipato (assistant)
- 2025: Cumbayá
- 2026: Deportivo Cuenca
- * Club domestic league appearances and goals

Daniel Alberto Néculman Suárez (born May 25, 1985) is an Argentine-Chilean former footballer who played for clubs in Argentina, Ecuador, Colombia, Peru, Chile, Mexico and Bolivia.

== Career ==
Born in Bariloche, Néculman began playing club football for local side Club Deportivo Municipales. After he impressed in the Bariloche local league with Municipales, Néculman signed for another Patagonian club Comisión de Actividades Infantiles Comodoro Rivadavia in the summer of 2002. He made his senior debut for C.A.I. in the 2002–03 Primera B Nacional relegation playoffs against Racing de Córdoba. Néculman failed to secure a regular place in C.A.I.'s first team, so he went on loan to Argentino A side Huracán de Comodoro Rivadavia. By 2006, Néculman moved to another Patagonian club Deportivo Madryn, playing in the Argentino B.

Néculman had his first opportunity to play abroad when he signed with Ecuador's Imbabura S.C. in 2007. It was the club's first ever season in the Ecuadorian Serie A, and Néculman led the club by scoring 16 goals (the second most in the league) but the club were relegated at the end of the season.

Néculman joined Colombia's Categoría Primera A side Independiente Santa Fe at the beginning of 2008. Initially, he failed to settle, but when manager "Pecoso" Castro was dismissed midway through the season, Néculman flourished under new manager Hernán Darío Gómez.

After a few seasons in Colombia, Néculman returned to Ecuador where he played for C.D. Olmedo and L.D.U. Portoviejo before joining Serie A side River Plate Ecuador in 2015. He was the top goalscorer for River, notching 10 goals by May 2015.

Late in his career, Néculman returned to Argentina where he played for Ferro Carril Oeste (General Pico) in the 2019–20 Torneo Federal A.

In total, Néculman played for 19 professional football clubs over nearly two decades; most of them outside his native Argentina.

== Coaching career ==
After serving as assistant coach in club such as Universidad Católica and Huachipato, Neculmán assumed as head coach of Cumbayá in February 2025. On 25 July 2026, he was appointed as manager of Deportivo Cuenca in the Ecuadorian Serie A.

== Personal life ==
Neculmán holds Chilean nationality by descent, since his mother is Chilean. He also naturalized Ecuadorian by residence.

== Honours ==
=== As player ===
- Independiente Santa Fe 2009 (Copa Colombia)
