= Iván Kaviedes =

Ecuadorian footballer (born 1977)

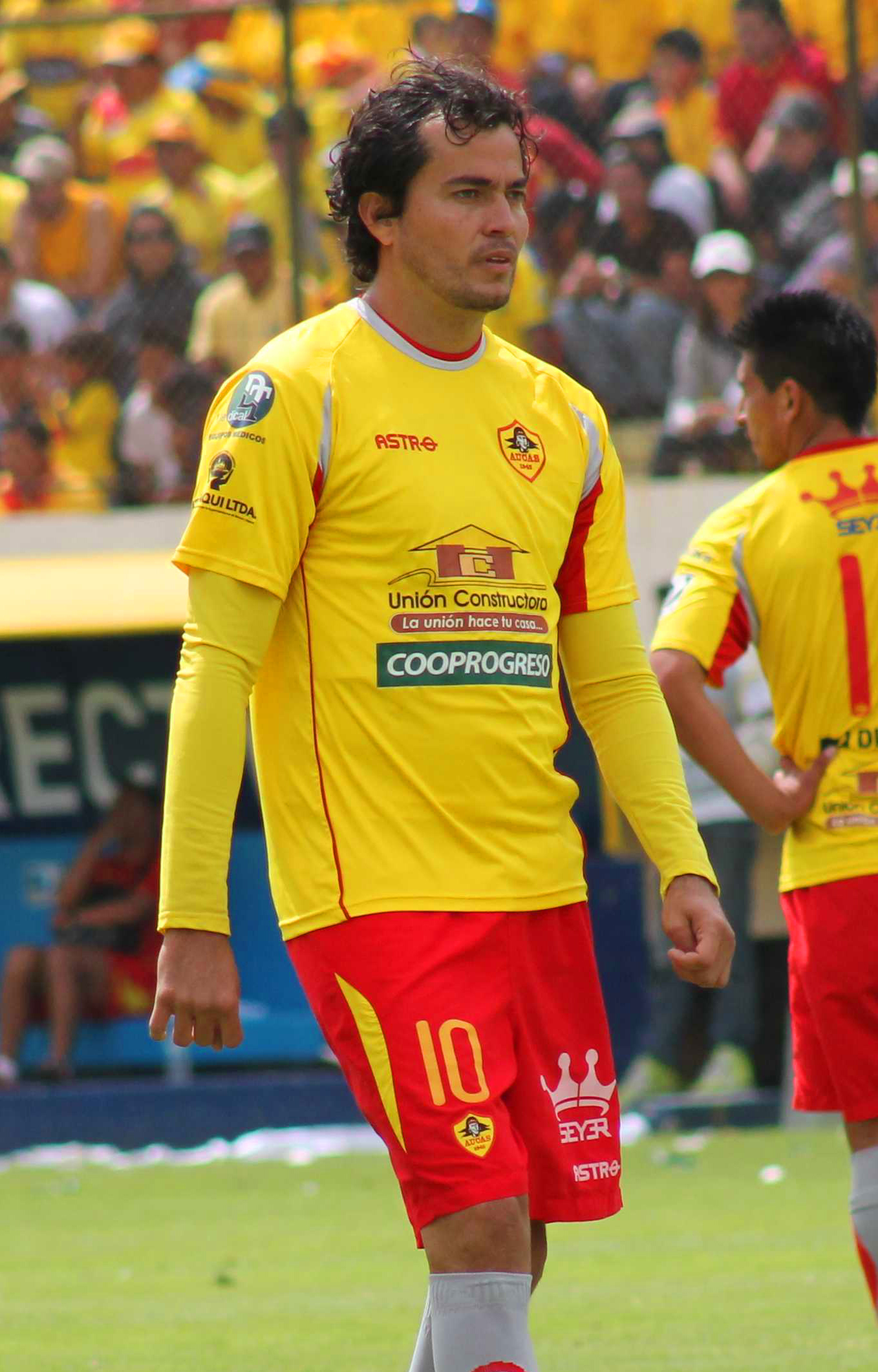
- Kaviedes in 2012

Personal information
- Full name: Jaime Iván Kaviedes Llorenty
- Date of birth: 24 October 1977 (age 49)
- Place of birth: Santo Domingo, Ecuador
- Height: 1.82 m (6 ft 0 in)
- Position: Forward

Senior career*
Years	Team	Apps	(Gls)
1995–1998	Emelec	57	(48)
1999	Perugia	14	(4)
1999–2003	Celta	6	(0)
2000	→ Puebla (loan)	17	(4)
2000–2001	→ Valladolid (loan)	23	(6)
2002	→ Porto (loan)	0	(0)
2002	→ Barcelona SC (loan)	8	(4)
2003	Puebla	6	(0)
2003	Deportivo Quito	10	(2)
2004–2006	Barcelona SC	43	(14)
2004	→ Crystal Palace (loan)	4	(0)
2005–2006	→ Argentinos Juniors (loan)	13	(1)
2007	El Nacional	34	(14)
2008	LDU Quito	2	(1)
2010–2011	Macará	22	(10)
2011–2012	El Nacional	16	(7)
2012	Deportivo Quito	0	(0)
2012	Aucas	17	(4)
2014	L.D.U. Loja	3	(0)
2014	L.D.U. Portoviejo	1	(0)
Total		296	(119)

International career
1996–2012	Ecuador	57	(17)
- * Club domestic league appearances and goals

Jaime Iván Kaviedes Llorenty (Greek: Ιβάν Καβιέδες; born 24 October 1977) is an Ecuadorian former professional footballer who played as a forward.

== Club career ==
Kaviedes rose to fame after scoring 43 goals in one season for Emelec in the 1998 Ecuadorian league. This led to a move to Perugia in the Italian Serie A in January 1999 for a transfer fee of 4 million USD (or 6 billion lire at the time). Kaviedes' stint was unsuccessful at Perugia, coached by Vujadin Boškov. He only stayed there five months, moving to Celta in the summer of 1999, and ever since then he journeyed around the world playing for a number of clubs in Europe, Mexico, and South America, even returning to his homeland.

After a brief spell in Deportivo Quito, Kaviedes signed with Premier League club Crystal Palace in 2004, and became the third Ecuadorian to play in the Premier League. He arrived at the club for a reported fee of reputedly £2 million, though there was confusion over whether he was signed on loan or on a full transfer. However, Kaviedes did not fit into Crystal Palace or with manager Iain Dowie's 4–5–1 formation. He was transferred out of the club in the 2004–05 winter transfer window.

After the 2006 FIFA World Cup he transferred from Argentinos Juniors in Argentina to El Nacional in his homeland, the 2006 Ecuadorian League Champions. In his first official game for the club, he scored an impressive four goals. He scored 14 goals in 2007. Kaviedes was transferred to LDU Quito for the 2008 season. After two games and one goal for the club, Kaviedes had a row with the directors of the Quito club and did not make an appearance for them for the rest of 2008. In 2009, he began to train again with LDU Portoviejo, but never signed with the club. At the end of 2009, Kaviedes was in a rehabilitation clinic for a couple of months. Because of unsportsmanlike conduct, Macara cancelled his contract and Kaviedes was searching for a club in Turkey or Lebanon.

In 2010, almost two years after last playing as a professional, he was signed by Macará of Ambato. In his third game for the club on 28 February against Universidad Católica, Kaviedes scored his first professional goal in 743 days. By the end of the day, he scored a hat-trick to give Macará their first win of the season. His last official appearance was with Ecuadorian outfit L.D.U. Portoviejo in 2014.

== International career ==
Due to his rise in worldwide prominence in the late 1990s, Kaviedes was given his Ecuador national team debut in a 2002 FIFA World Cup qualifier against Brazil in 1998.

Kaviedes scored in Ecuador's 1–1 draw with Uruguay in 2001 during the 2002 FIFA World Cup qualifiers, which allowed Ecuador to qualify for the first time ever for a FIFA World Cup.

He was part of the Ecuador national team that played at the 2002 and 2006 FIFA World Cups. He inherited the number 10 shirt for Ecuador after Alex Aguinaga's retirement, although it has been worn by Felipe Caicedo among a few others.

Kaviedes played for Ecuador during the 2006 World Cup, defeating Poland 2–0 in the opening match and Costa Rica 3–0. It was in this game that El Nine (his nickname) scored his first World Cup goal, from a cross by Edison Mendez. Kaviedes' celebration involved donning a yellow Spider-Man mask and raising his arms—mimicking his late teammate Otilino Tenorio's trademark goal celebration, who was killed in a car crash in 2005. "Otilino is accompanying us from heaven," Kaviedes later said. That goal helped Ecuador qualify to the second round alongside host Germany in Group A. As of 2008, he also has scored two goals in the qualifying campaign for his country.

Kaviedes also represented his country at the 1999 Copa América.

== Style of play ==
Kaviedes was known as a striker with good touch, vision, passing range, and a keen eye for goal. While not particularly strong in the air, Kaviedes has scored spectacular overhead goals in his career. He scored a goal with a bicycle kick with his back turned against FC Barcelona while playing for Real Valladolid. This goal was voted goal of the year.

== Personal life ==
Kaviedes is of Greek and Italian descent.

== Career statistics ==
List of international goals scored by Iván Kaviedes
No.	Date	Venue	Opponent	Score	Result	Competition	Ref.
1	1 July 1999	Estadio Feliciano Cáceres, Luque, Paraguay	Argentina	1–3	1–3	1999 Copa America	
2	4 July 1999	Estadio Feliciano Cáceres, Luque, Paraguay	Uruguay	1–2	1–2	1999 Copa America	
3	25 June 2000	Estadio Olímpico Atahualpa, Quito, Ecuador	Panama	2–0	5–0	Friendly	
4	25 June 2000	Estadio Olímpico Atahualpa, Quito, Ecuador	Panama	4–0	5–0	Friendly	
5	25 June 2000	Estadio Olímpico Atahualpa, Quito, Ecuador	Panama	5–0	5–0	Friendly	
6	15 November 2000	Estadio José Pachencho Romero, Maracaibo,Venezuela	Venezuela	1–0	2–1	2002 FIFA World Cup qualification	
7	6 October 2001	Hernando Siles Stadium, La Paz, Bolivia	Bolivia	3–0	5–1	2002 FIFA World Cup qualification	
8	7 November 2001	Estadio Olímpico Atahualpa, Quito, Ecuador	Uruguay	1–1	1–1	2002 FIFA World Cup qualification	
9	27 March 2002	Giant Stadium, East Rutherford, United States	Bulgaria	1–0	3–0	Friendly	
10	27 March 2002	Giant Stadium, East Rutherford, United States	Bulgaria	3–0	3–0	Friendly	
11	20 November 2002	Estadio Olímpico Atahualpa, Quito, Ecuador	Costa Rica	2–2	2–2	Friendly	
12	10 October 2004	Estadio Olímpico Atahualpa, Quito, Ecuador	Chile	1–0	2–0	2006 FIFA World Cup qualification	
13	29 December 2005	Cairo International Stadium, Cairo, Egypt	Uganda	1–0	1–2	Friendly	
14	15 June 2006	Volksparkstadion, Hamburg, Germany	Costa Rica	3–0	3–0	2006 World Cup	
15	17 November 2007	Estadio Defensores del Chaco, Asunción, Paraguay	Paraguay	1–3	1–5	2010 World Cup qualification	
16	21 November 2007	Estadio Olímpico Atahualpa, Quito, Ecuador	Peru	2–0	5–1	2010 World Cup qualification	
