= 2007 Copa Sudamericana =

2007 Copa Nissan Sudamericana de Clubes 2007 Copa Nissan Sul-americana do Clubes

Tournament details
- Dates: July 31 – December 5
- Teams: 34 (from 12 associations)

Final positions
- Champions: (Argentina) Arsenal (1st title)
- Runners-up: (Mexico) América

Tournament statistics
- Matches played: 66
- Goals scored: 155 (2.35 per match)
- Top scorer: (Colombia) Ricardo Ciciliano (6)
- Best goalkeeper: (Mexico) Guillermo Ochoa

The 2007 edition of the Copa Sudamericana was played by 34 teams; 30 teams from the CONMEBOL and 4 teams from the CONCACAF. CONMEBOL organized the tournament and invited three North American clubs which were the best three of the CONCACAF Champions' Cup 2007; the fourth North American club was the defending champion Pachuca. The official draw took place on May 22 in Buenos Aires.

The Argentine club Arsenal de Sarandí won their first international title by defeating América in the final, winning 3-2 in the first leg and losing 2-1 in the second leg, which was the only game that they lost. Arsenal scored at least three goals in their opponents stadium in four of the five games they played. They defeated San Lorenzo, an Argentine club that recently won the 2007 Clausura, the Brazilian club Goiás, Argentine giant River Plate and the strongest rivals of Mexican football, Guadalajara and America.

This is the third time a Mexican club has reached the final, and the fourth title for Argentine clubs in the competition. Arsenal became only the third Argentine club to win a major international tournament without winning the Argentine league first, after Lanús and Talleres de Córdoba. They were also the first Argentine club other than Boca Juniors to win an international title since San Lorenzo won the Copa Sudamericana 2002.

== Qualified teams ==
The Copa Sudamericana 2007 tournament was the seventh edition of the Copa Sudamericana soccer tournament.

Association	Team	Qualify method
Argentina	Boca Juniors	Invitee
Argentina	River Plate	Invitee
Argentina	Estudiantes	2006–07 Argentine Primera División 2nd place overall
Argentina	San Lorenzo	2006–07 Argentine Primera División 3rd place overall
Argentina	Arsenal	2006–07 Argentine Primera División 5th place overall
Argentina	Lanús	2006–07 Argentine Primera División 6th place
Bolivia	Jorge Wilstermann	2006 Segundo Torneo winner
Bolivia	Real Potosí	2006 Segundo Torneo runner-up
Brazil	São Paulo	2006 Série A winner
Brazil	Vasco da Gama	2006 Série A 6th place
Brazil	Figueirense	2006 Série A 7th place
Brazil	Goiás	2006 Série A 8th place
Brazil	Corinthians	2006 Série A 9th place
Brazil	Cruzeiro	2006 Série A 10th place
Brazil	Botafogo	2006 Série A 12th place
Brazil	Atlético Paranaense	2006 Série A 13th place
Chile	Colo-Colo	2007 Liguilla Pre-Sudamericana winner
Chile	Audax Italiano	2007 Liguilla Pre-Sudamericana runner-up
Colombia	Atlético Nacional	2006 Reclasificacion 2nd place
Colombia	Millonarios	2006 Reclasificacion 3rd place
Ecuador	El Nacional	2006 Second Stage winner
Ecuador	Olmedo	2007 First Stage winner
Mexico	Pachuca	2006 Copa Sudamericana champion
Mexico	Guadalajara	2007 CONCACAF Champions' Cup runner-up
Mexico	América	Most total points in 2007 Clausura & 2006 Apertura
Paraguay	Libertad	2006 Liga Paraguaya winner
Paraguay	Tacuary	2006 Liguilla Pre-Sudamericana winner
Peru	Coronel Bolognesi	2006 Torneo Descentralizado 4th place
Peru	Universitario	2006 Torneo Descentralizado 5th place
United States	D.C. United	2007 CONCACAF Champions' Cup third place
Uruguay	Danubio	2006–07 Liguilla 3rd place
Uruguay	Defensor Sporting	2006–07 Liguilla 4th place
Venezuela	Zamora	2006–07 Primera División 4th place
Venezuela	Carabobo	2006–07 Primera División 5th place

== Fixture Dates ==
- Preliminary Rounds: Between July 31 and September 6
- Round of 16: Between September 11 and October 4
- Quarterfinals: Between October 9 and November 1
- Semifinals: Between November 6 and November 15
- Finals: Between November 28 and December 5
- Full Schedule

== First stage ==
The table gives the teams in the first round gathered in elimination groups of 2 teams or 4 teams. Teams hosting the first game are on the left. Advancing teams are in bold.

Team 1	Agg.	Team 2	1st leg	2nd leg
Chile/Bolivia Preliminary
**Audax Italiano** (Chile)	3–1	(Bolivia) Jorge Wilstermann	2–0	1–1
Real Potosí (Bolivia)	2–4	(Chile) **Colo-Colo**	1–1	1–3
Venezuela/Ecuador Preliminary
**Olmedo** (Ecuador)	3–1	(Venezuela) Zamora	1–0	2–1
Carabobo (Venezuela)	0–5	(Ecuador) **El Nacional**	0–1	0–4
Colombia/Perú Preliminary
**Millonarios** (Colombia)	1–1 (5–4 p)	(Peru) Coronel Bolognesi	0–1	1–0
Universitario (Peru)	0–2	(Colombia) **Atlético Nacional**	0–1	0–1
Paraguay/Uruguay Preliminary
**Defensor Sporting** (Uruguay)	4–3	(Paraguay) Libertad	2–1	2–2
**Tacuary** (Paraguay)	2–2 (4–1 p)	(Uruguay) Danubio	1–1	1–1

== Second stage ==
Team 1	Agg.	Team 2	1st leg	2nd leg
Atlético Paranaense (Brazil)	2–6	(Brazil) **Vasco da Gama**	2–4	0–2
**Lanús** (Argentina)	3–2	(Argentina) Estudiantes	2–0	1–2
**Arsenal** (Argentina)	4–1	(Argentina) San Lorenzo	1–1	3–0
**Goiás** (Brazil)	2–1	(Brazil) Cruzeiro	2–0	0–1
**Colo-Colo** (Chile)	1–1 (a)	(Chile) Audax Italiano	0–0	1–1
Atlético Nacional (Colombia)	2–3	(Colombia) **Millonarios**	2–3	0–0
Figueirense (Brazil)	3–3 (a)	(Brazil) **São Paulo**	2–2	1–1
**Botafogo** (Brazil)	5–2	(Brazil) Corinthians	3–1	2–1
**El Nacional** (Ecuador)	3–0	(Ecuador) Olmedo	2–0	1–0
Tacuary (Paraguay)	1–4	(Uruguay) **Defensor Sporting**	1–1	0–3

== Final stages ==
=== Bracket ===
To prevent a final with two teams from the same country, CONMEBOL paired Arsenal with River Plate in the semifinals, thus reordering the bracket.

Round of 16
(Argentina) Lanús	2	0	2
(Brazil) **Vasco da Gama**	0	3	3
(Mexico) Pachuca	1	2	3
(Mexico) **América**	4	0	4
(Argentina) Boca Juniors	2	0	2
(Brazil) **São Paulo** (a)	1	1	2
(Colombia) **Millonarios** (p)	1	1	2 (7)
(Chile) Colo Colo	1	1	2 (6)
(United States) D.C. United	2	0	2
(Mexico) **Guadalajara** (a)	1	1	2
(Brazil) Goiás	2	1	3
(Argentina) **Arsenal**	3	1	4
(Uruguay) **Defensor**	3	0	3
(Ecuador) El Nacional	0	2	2
(Brazil) Botafogo	1	2	3
(Argentina) **River Plate**	0	4	4

Quarterfinals
(Brazil) Vasco da Gama	0	1	1
(Mexico) **América**	2	0	2
(Brazil) São Paulo	0	0	0
(Colombia) **Millonarios**	1	2	3
(Mexico) Guadalajara	0	1	1
(Argentina) **Arsenal**	0	3	3
(Uruguay) Defensor Sporting	2	0	2
(Argentina) **River Plate** (a)	2	0	2

Semifinals
(Mexico) **América**	3	2	5
(Colombia) Millonarios	2	0	2
(Argentina) **Arsenal** (p)	0	0	0 (4)
(Argentina) River Plate	0	0	0 (2)

Finals
(Mexico) América	2	2	4
(Argentina) **Arsenal** (a)	3	1	4
