= Deportivo Azogues =

Ecuadorian football club

- Full name: Deportivo Azogues
- Nickname(s): Guacamayos (Macaws)
- Founded: May 25, 2005; 19 years ago
- Dissolved: 2016
- Ground: Estadio Municipal Jorge Andrade Cantos
- Capacity: 9,000
- Chairman: Eugenio Morocho
- Manager: Renato Salas
- League: Serie B
- Dissolved: Serie B, 7th
Home colours	Away colours

Deportivo Azogues was an Ecuadorian football club based in Azogues. It played in the Serie B, until they got relegated in 2015 into Segunda Categoria the third tier of football in Ecuador. It played its home games at the Estadio Municipal Jorge Andrade Cantos.

The Club did not present itself to play a match in the 3rd tier and later it was confirmed that it dissolved.
