= Alexis Sánchez =

Chilean footballer (born 1988)

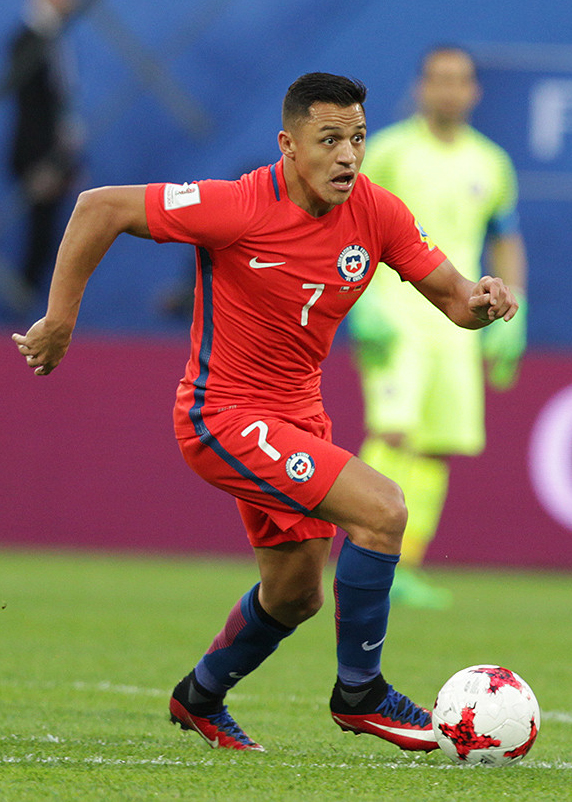
- Sánchez with Chile at the 2017 FIFA Confederations Cup

Personal information
- Full name: Alexis Alejandro Sánchez Sánchez
- Date of birth: 19 December 1988 (age 37)
- Place of birth: Tocopilla, Chile
- Height: 1.69 m (5 ft 7 in)
- Positions: Winger; striker

Team information
- Current team: CF Montréal
- Number: 10

Youth career
- 1999–2000: Universidad Católica
- 2000–2003: Escuela Bernardo O'Higgins
- 2004–2005: Cobreloa

Senior career*
Years	Team	Apps	(Gls)
2005–2006	Cobreloa	47	(12)
2006–2011	Udinese	95	(20)
2006–2007	→ Colo-Colo (loan)	32	(5)
2007–2008	→ River Plate (loan)	23	(4)
2011–2014	Barcelona	88	(39)
2014–2018	Arsenal	122	(60)
2018–2020	Manchester United	32	(3)
2019–2020	→ Inter Milan (loan)	22	(4)
2020–2022	Inter Milan	57	(12)
2022–2023	Marseille	35	(14)
2023–2024	Inter Milan	23	(2)
2024–2025	Udinese	13	(0)
2025–2026	Sevilla	28	(4)
2026–	CF Montréal	15	(0)

International career^{‡}
2004	Chile U16	2	(0)
2005	Chile U17	4	(2)
2006–2007	Chile U20	15	(7)
2006	Chile U23	2	(0)
2006–	Chile	168	(51)
Medal record
Men's football
Representing Chile
Copa América
Winner	2015 Chile
Winner	2016 United States
FIFA Confederations Cup
Runner-up	2017 Russia
FIFA U-20 World Cup
Third place	2007 Canada
- * Club domestic league appearances and goals as of 03:35, 8 November 2026 (UTC) ‡ National team caps and goals as of 03:42, 11 June 2025 (UTC)

Alexis Alejandro Sánchez Sánchez (Spanish pronunciation: [aˈleksis ˈsantʃes]; born 19 December 1988), also known mononymously as Alexis, is a Chilean professional footballer who plays as a winger or a striker for Major League Soccer club CF Montréal and the Chile national team. He is regarded as one of the best forwards of his generation and one of the greatest Chilean players of all time. He is also one of the few footballers to have made at least 1,000 competitive appearances (the first Chilean to achieve the feat, since the time matches are recorded).

Dubbed "El Niño Maravilla" (The Wonderboy), Sánchez began his senior club career playing for Cobreloa, aged 15, and signed with Udinese in 2006, aged 18; he won consecutive league titles while on loan to Colo-Colo and River Plate. Sánchez was the subject of a record association football transfer when he signed for Barcelona in 2011 in a transfer worth €37.5 million, becoming the most expensive Chilean player of all time. There, Sánchez won six trophies, including a La Liga title and a Copa del Rey.

Sánchez joined Arsenal in 2014 in a transfer worth £31.7 million (€35 million). In England, he experienced his peak years individually, helping Arsenal win two FA Cups, being awarded the 2015 PFA Fans' Player of the Year, and being voted into the 2015 PFA Team of the Year. In 2018, he moved to league rivals Manchester United in a swap deal; he signed for Inter Milan a year later, and won a Serie A title and a Coppa Italia. In 2022, he signed for Ligue 1 club Marseille, before returning to Inter a year later and winning a second Serie A title in 2023–24.

Sánchez made his senior international debut for Chile in 2006 at age 18, and has since earned 168 caps, appearing in eight major tournaments and becoming both his country's most capped player and all-time top goalscorer. He led Chile to their first victory in a major tournament by winning the 2015 Copa América, scoring the winning penalty in the final; he captained the team to a repeat of this triumph at the Copa América Centenario in 2016, winning the Golden Ball for the tournament's best player.

== Club career ==
=== Early career ===
Sánchez had a brief stint with a Universidad Católica Academy based in Rancagua in 1999, being coached by the Chilean former international footballer René Valenzuela. In addition to this, he represented the Escuela Bernardo O'Higgins team from Tocopilla in national championships.

=== Cobreloa ===
Born in Tocopilla, Sánchez was a product of C.D. Cobreloa's prolific youth ranks where he was teammate of current Chile national team players such as Charles Aránguiz and Eduardo Vargas. In February 2005, Sánchez was promoted to the senior first team by manager Nelson Acosta.

Sánchez's made his debut against Deportes Temuco on 12 February and scored his first professional goal in a 2–1 victory over Deportes Concepción on 18 March. He played his first Copa Libertadores game against Once Caldas aged 16, which made him one of the youngest players on debut for the tournament.

After an impressive season with Cobreloa, Sánchez caught the attention of Serie A club Udinese, which signed him for a £1.7 million fee, on 21 April 2006. Udinese, however, began a maturation project with Sánchez and immediately loaned him to Chilean giants Colo-Colo in a season-long deal.

=== Colo-Colo ===
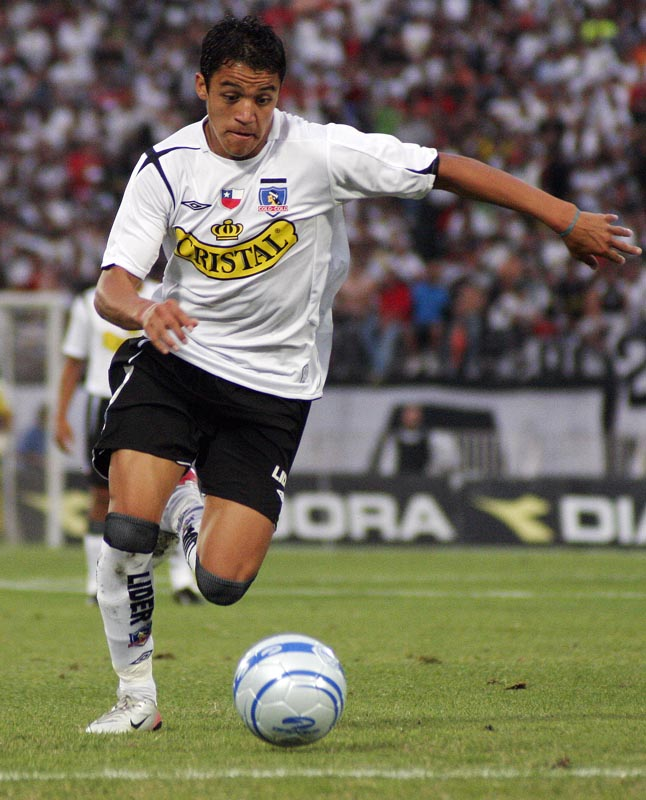
Sánchez on loan at Colo-Colo against Audax Italiano in the 2006 Torneo Clausura final

Sánchez debuted for Colo-Colo on 23 June 2006 in a 1–1 draw with Antofagasta; he scored his first goal on 29 October during the Chilean football derby against Universidad de Chile in a 4–2 win. His good performances allowed him to break into the starting lineup after successfully challenging veteran striker Mario Cáceres, and he then began partnering Humberto Suazo in the forward position. On 1 November, he scored a brace in a 4–4 league draw against Deportes La Serena. as well as his first continental goal in a 7–2 thrash over Alajuelense from Costa Rica for the Copa Sudamericana. Nevertheless, Colo-Colo was runner-up of that tournament after losing the final against Pachuca of Mexico. On 23 December 2006, Sánchez won his first professional title after being starter in the Torneo Clausura final against Audax Italiano which his team won 3–2.

The next season, on 23 March 2007, he scored his first Copa Libertadores goals against Caracas at Cúcuta where he netted a hat-trick to a 4–0 away win. On 12 May, Sánchez scored his first and only one league goal during a 3–1 home win over Santiago Wanderers, key in the race for title with Universidad Católica which Colo-Colo finally reached after beat Palestino 1–0 at Monumental the last matchday. Noteworthy, it meant the club's 26th league title.

After Sánchez's impressive FIFA U-20 World Cup (where Chile achieved the third place with José Sulantay as coach), his loan with Colo-Colo expired and on 15 August 2007, he joined Argentina's River Plate on loan from Udinese.

=== Udinese ===
After a successful season in Argentina, Sánchez left South America in July 2008 to join Udinese, where he would meet up with Chilean compatriot Mauricio Isla. Sánchez made his non-competitive debut in a 3–0 win over Bassano and was named the man of match. On 14 September, he played his first Serie A match in a 1–0 loss with Juventus and four days later, he made his European debut against Borussia Dortmund. On 19 October 2008, Sánchez scored his first league goal against Lecce. After this first goal, Sánchez got into a minor slump, in which he took much criticism. The criticism ended after scoring the winning goal in the 90th minute against Bologna in a 1–0 win, being named the man of match.

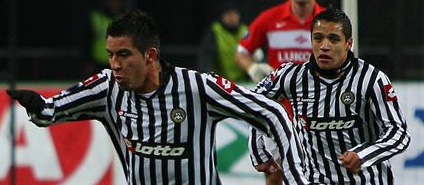
Sánchez (right) and fellow Chilean Mauricio Isla in a UEFA Cup match against Spartak Moscow in 2008

The next season, Sánchez played an important role for Udinese in the Coppa Italia, being a key player in the team that eliminated Milan, assisting Gökhan Inler for the winning goal. In the semi-final second leg, Sánchez was the man of match after playing a successful game against Roma, including scoring his first Coppa Italia goal in the 81st minute. It was not enough, however, as the aggregate score finished 2–1 in favour of Roma. By the end of this year, Sánchez scored a total of 5 goals (4 at the end of tournament) in 32 appearances.

On 27 February 2011, Sánchez scored four of his team's seven goals as Udinese comfortably defeated Palermo 7–0, playing only the first 52 minutes of the game. This event meant he broke the record of goals scored by a Chilean player (in a single match) in Serie A, beating the records set by countrymen Marcelo Salas and Iván Zamorano.

During his successful season at Udinese, Sánchez and Italian striker Antonio Di Natale became one of the best scoring duos in Serie A; they tallied 39 goals between them, two goals short of the Alessandro Del Piero–David Trezeguet duo that completed 41 goals in the 2007–08 season. In recognition of his achievements, Sánchez was named the world's most promising youngster of the 2011 season by the users of FIFA.com, where users had to choose between Sánchez, Gareth Bale, Javier Pastore, Ganso and Neymar in a poll. Sánchez ranked 56th in the May 2011 edition of Castrol Performance Index and 24th among the forwards.

=== Barcelona ===
"I am a great admirer of Ronaldo. I want to wear the same number. He wore number 9 here and was very successful"

— Sánchez on wanting to emulate Ronaldo at Barcelona, whom he regards as "the best player of all time".

On 20 July 2011, Barcelona confirmed they had agreed to a €26 million fee (including €11.5 million in certain bonuses) with Udinese for the transfer of Sánchez and he became the first Chilean to play for the club. "Sánchez is very young", said then-manager Pep Guardiola; "He can play in all three attacking positions, he shows intense defensive skills, he's direct and from what I've been told, he's a very nice kid." The transfer was finalised five days later when he passed a medical and signed a five-year contract. "I want to learn from players like Lionel Messi and Xavi Hernández—and I want to help the club win more titles", said Sánchez.

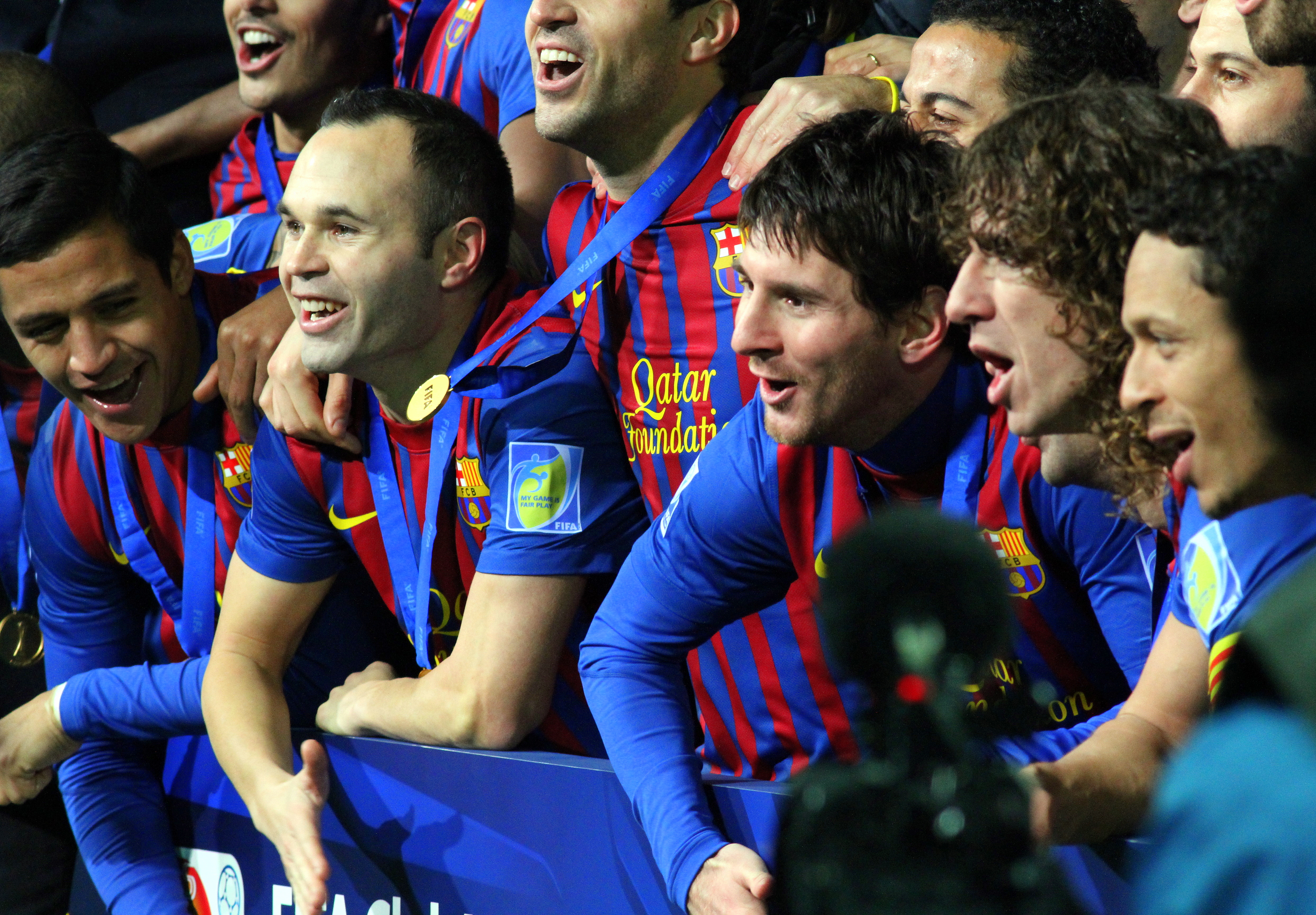
Sánchez (far left) celebrating with his Barcelona teammates after defeating Santos in the 2011 FIFA Club World Cup Final

Sánchez's debut season for Barcelona was mired with short-term injuries. He made his debut on 14 August 2011 against archrivals Real Madrid in the 2011 Supercopa de España first leg away match, suffering a thigh injury after a challenge by Marcelo. Barcelona won the tie 5–4 on aggregate. He made his return two weeks later as a substitute in the 2011 UEFA Super Cup, won by Barca 2–0. Sánchez then started the opening match of La Liga, at home against Villarreal, and scored his first goal in a 5–0 win. A week later, on 10 September, he was stretchered off after 30 minutes following a challenge from Dani Estrada in a domestic league match against Real Sociedad. Sánchez returned on 1 November in an away match against Viktoria Plzeň. On 10 December, he scored Barça's equaliser against Real Madrid in a match they went on to win 3–1 away at the Santiago Bernabéu Stadium. On 14 February 2012, Sánchez scored the first and second UEFA Champions League goals of his career in Barcelona's 3–1 victory against Bayer Leverkusen.

In the 2012–13 campaign, on 2 October 2012 Sánchez scored the first goal for Barcelona in a 2–0 away win against Benfica. On 10 February 2013, then scored his first goal of the Liga season in Barça's 6–1 home win against Getafe. From February onwards, Sánchez scored in matches against Deportivo de La Coruña, Mallorca, Athletic Bilbao, Real Betis, Atlético Madrid and Espanyol to end the season with eight league goals. Barcelona won the league title, ending the season with 100 points.

On 26 October 2013, Sánchez scored the winning goal as Barça beat Real Madrid 2–1 at Camp Nou in the first Clásico fixture of the 2013–14 La Liga season. On 5 January 2014, Sánchez scored his first hat-trick for Barcelona in a 4–0 win against Elche. He ended the 2013–14 season with a career-high 21 goals in all competitions, including 19 in La Liga.

=== Arsenal ===
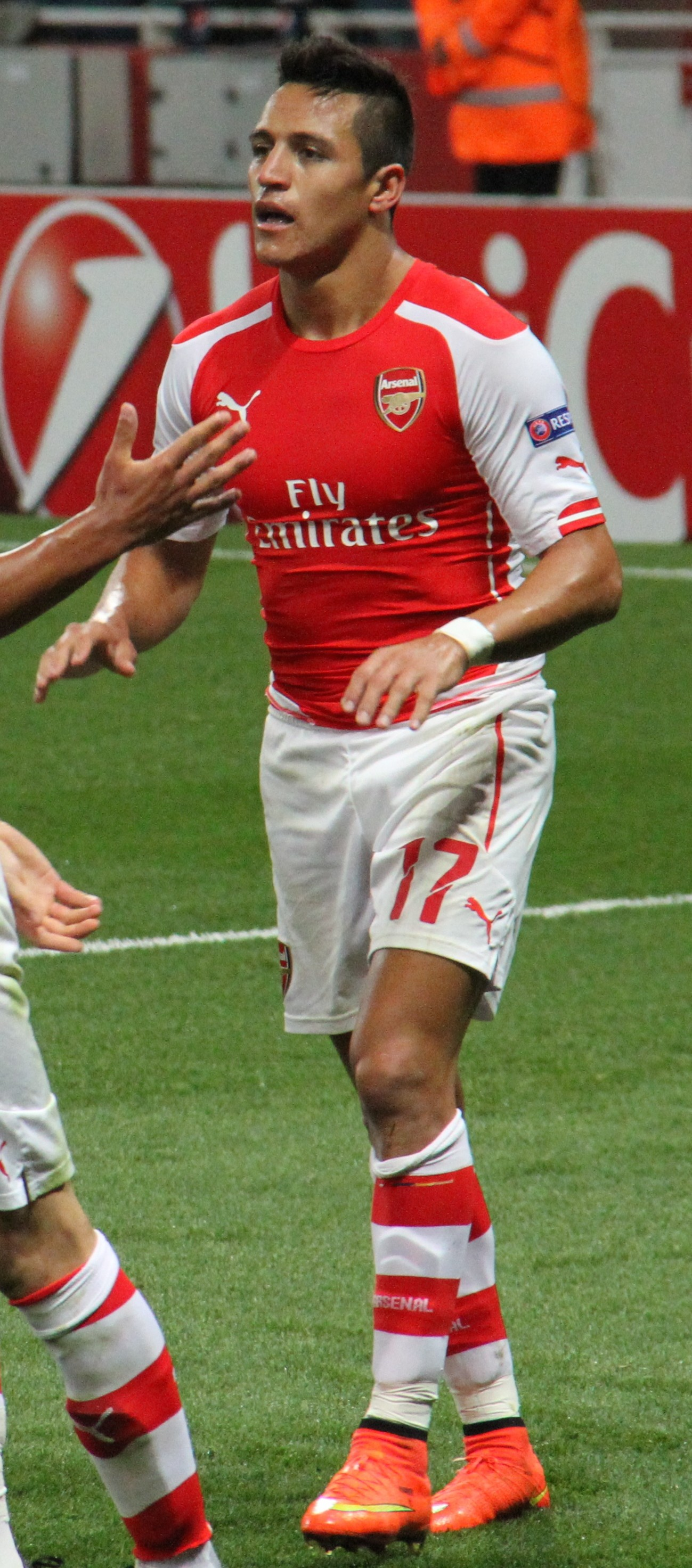
Sánchez with Arsenal in 2014

On 10 July 2014, Sánchez signed for Arsenal on a long-term contract for a transfer fee of £31.7 million. Sánchez was given the squad number 17, previously worn by Nacho Monreal, who took the vacant number 18 instead. In a statement released by the club, Sánchez said that he was "so happy to be joining Arsenal, a club which has a great manager, a fantastic squad of players, huge support around the world and a great stadium in London". Manager Arsène Wenger praised Sánchez, saying that the Chilean international "has consistently produced top-quality performances at the highest level for a number of seasons now and we are all excited to see him integrate into the Arsenal squad". Sánchez made his first appearance for Arsenal on 2 August 2014, as a substitute during a 5–1 win against Benfica in the pre-season Emirates Cup tournament.

==== 2014–17: FA Cup wins ====
Sánchez's first competitive appearance was against Manchester City in the Community Shield, on 10 August, playing in the first half and helping Arsenal to a 3–0 win. On 16 August, he made his Premier League debut against Crystal Palace, assisting Laurent Koscielny's equaliser in a 2–1 home win. He then scored his first goal for Arsenal on 27 August, slotting the ball past Beşiktaş goalkeeper Tolga Zengin in stoppage time of the first half to secure a 1–0 aggregate victory and a spot in the group stage of the 2014–15 Champions League. Following the game, Wenger was full of praise for Sánchez, with the Arsenal manager saying, "He had a good game, not only on the technical side but on the fighting side. He was mobile, dangerous and has shown as well he has great fighting spirit, qualities that will be very important in the Premier League." His first league goal came four days later, netting the opening goal in a 1–1 draw away to newly promoted Leicester City. He then scored his second league goal in as many games against previous season champions Manchester City, demonstrating perfect technique to sidefoot a volley high past goalkeeper Joe Hart in a 2–2 draw at the Emirates Stadium.

Sánchez scored his fourth goal for Arsenal, from a free-kick, as the Gunners fell to 2–1 defeat to Southampton in the League Cup. He scored his first goal in the Champions League proper for the Gunners on 1 October, scoring Arsenal's third goal of their 4–1 home win over Galatasaray and also provided assists for two goals by Danny Welbeck. On 18 October, he scored the opening goal and later assisted a late Welbeck equaliser in a 2–2 draw against Hull City at home. The following league fixture saw him scoring a brace against Sunderland after capitalising on errors made by defender Wes Brown and former Arsenal goalkeeper Vito Mannone. On 1 November, Sánchez again scored a brace, this time against Burnley in a 3–0 victory. With that brace, he moved to 10 goals for the season across all competitions. He and Yaya Sanogo scored against Borussia Dortmund in 2–0 win as Arsenal qualified for the knockout stages of the Champions League. On 3 December, he scored the winner against Southampton in the 89th minute to give the Gunners a 1–0 win.

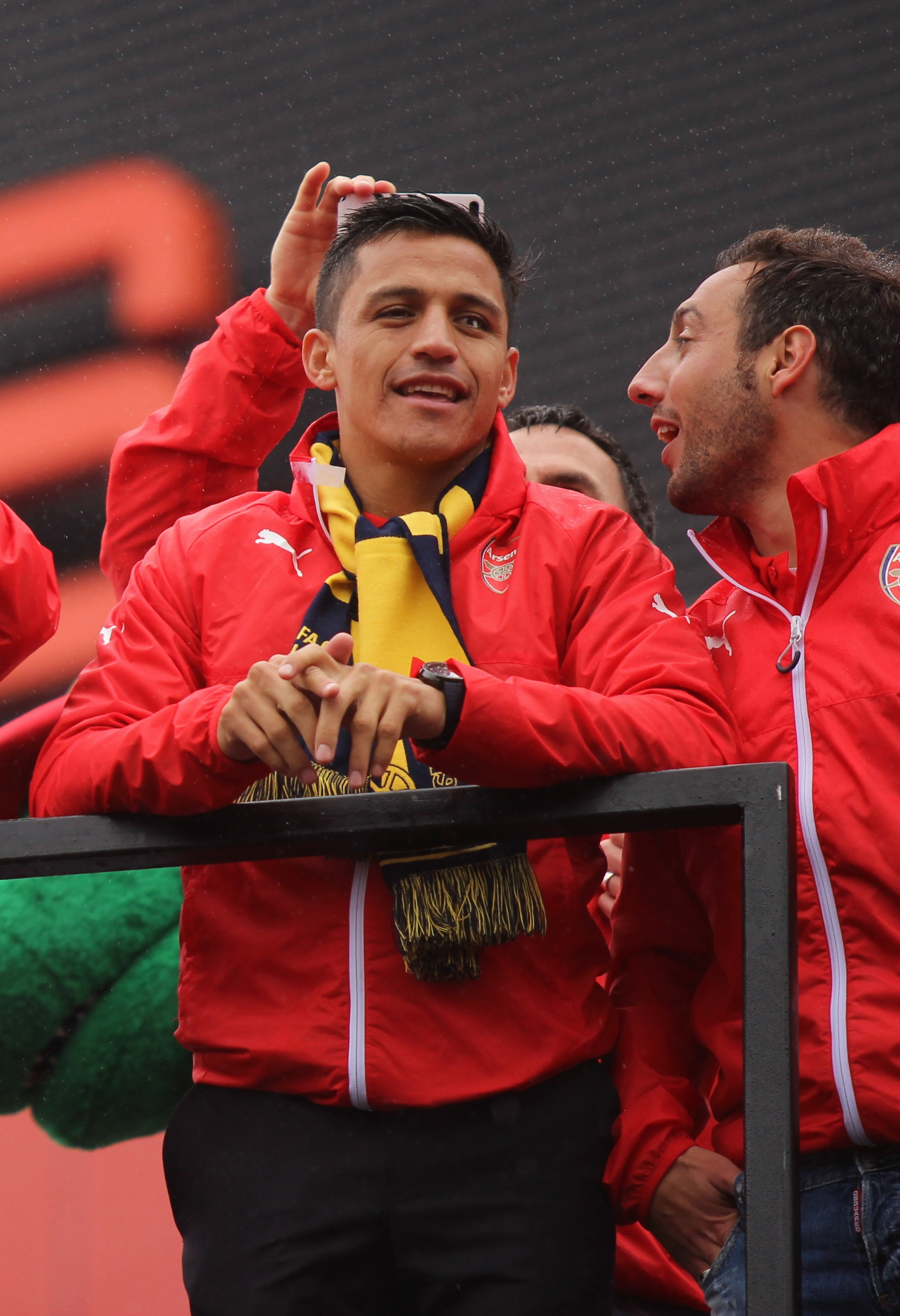
Sánchez during Arsenal's FA Cup victory parade in 2015

Sánchez scored the first goal in Arsenal's 2–1 home win over Queens Park Rangers on 26 December and assisted the second goal for Tomáš Rosický; earlier in the same match, Sánchez had a penalty saved by goalkeeper Robert Green after being brought down by Armand Traoré. On 4 January 2015, Sánchez scored and assisted his first ever FA Cup goals as Arsenal knocked out Hull City, the previous season's runners-up in the third round. Sánchez assisted Per Mertesacker and scored in the 82nd minute, being substituted two minutes later by Chuba Akpom. In Arsenal's next Premier League match, against Stoke City, Sánchez was involved in all the three goals as Arsenal beat the Potters 3–0 at the Emirates. He first assisted Laurent Koscielny and then scored two goals of his own. His performance was praised by Thierry Henry, who called him, "Arsenal's best signing of the last six years."

On 4 March, Sánchez ended a run of eight games without a goal by scoring Arsenal's second goal as they beat QPR 2–1 at Loftus Road. Sánchez scored Arsenal's third goal on 4 April as they beat Liverpool 4–1 at the Emirates and was chosen as the man of the match.

On 18 April, Sánchez scored both of Arsenal's goals in the FA Cup semi-final as Arsenal defeated Reading 2–1 after extra time. Eight days later, he was the only Arsenal player named in the PFA Team of the Year. On 4 May, Sánchez scored another brace, this time against Hull City in a 3–1 away win. On 29 May, he was voted as the 2015 PFA Fans' Player of the Year.

Sánchez reached his 25th goal of the season in the 2015 FA Cup Final on 30 May with the second goal in a 4–0 defeat of Aston Villa at Wembley Stadium, a long-range strike. Sánchez, who also headed an assist for Theo Walcott's opening goal, became the first Chilean to score in an FA Cup final since Newcastle United's George Robledo in 1952. He capped off his first season by winning Arsenal's Player of the Year award.

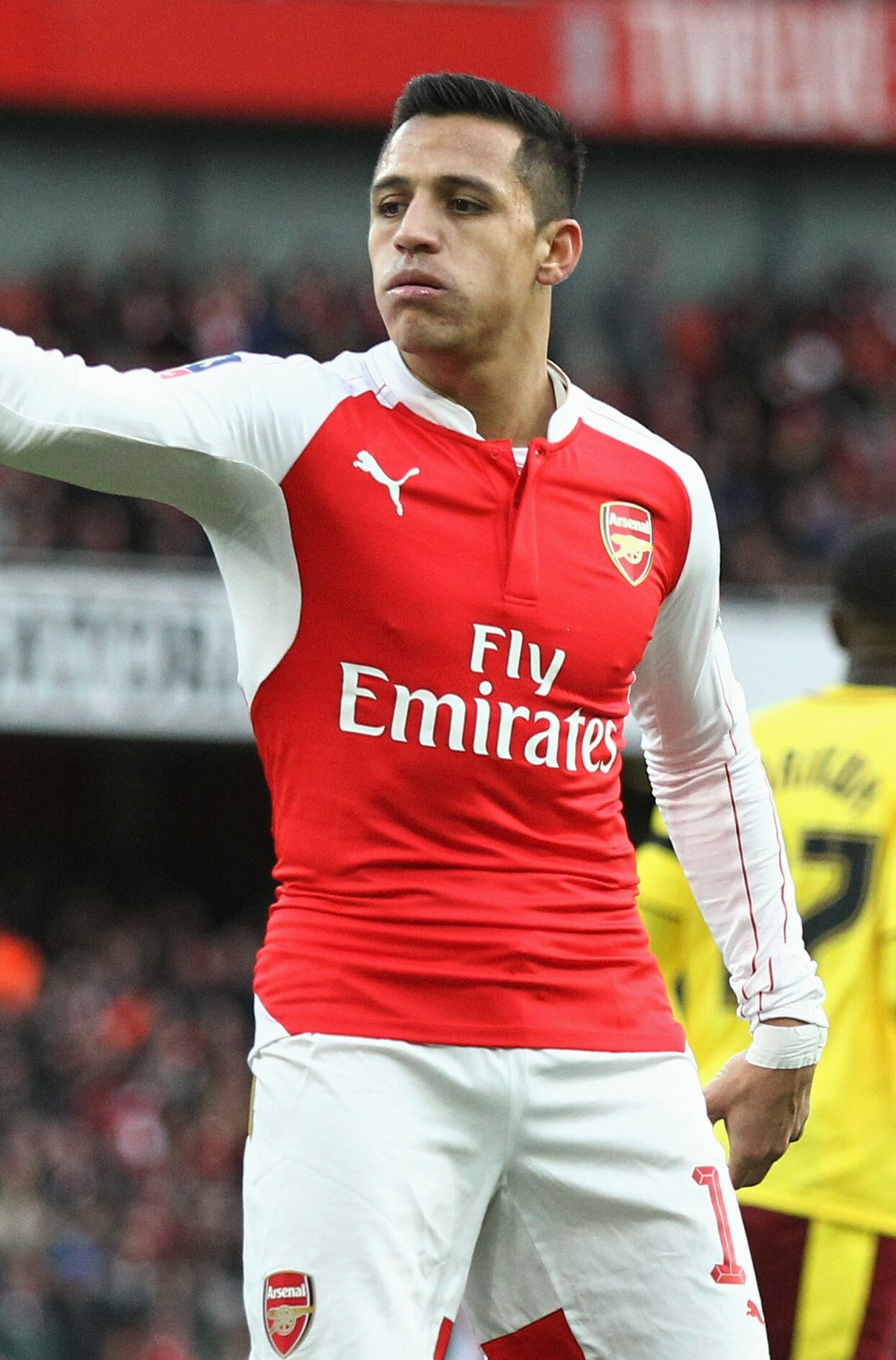
Sánchez playing for Arsenal in 2016

Sánchez made his first appearance of the 2015–16 season as a substitute in Arsenal's 2–0 loss to West Ham United on the opening day of the 2015–16 Premier League. The following week, on his first start of the season, Sánchez had a header deflected into the Crystal Palace net by Damien Delaney to give Arsenal a 2–1 win at Selhurst Park. The goal, however, was later credited as an own goal by the Palace defender.

On 26 September 2015, Sánchez ended a run of ten Premier League matches without a goal by scoring his first hat-trick for Arsenal in a 5–2 win at Leicester. This made him the first player to score hat-tricks in each of the Premier League, Serie A and La Liga. Sánchez then scored his first Champions League goal of the season a few days later, in a 3–2 loss to Olympiacos, latching onto a Theo Walcott cross to head beyond Olympiacos goalkeeper Roberto. The following league match, the last match before the international break, Sánchez scored for the third match in a row, scoring a brace in the first 20 minutes as Arsenal defeated Manchester United 3–0 at the Emirates Stadium and moved up to second place in the league. After the international break, Sánchez carried on his fine goalscoring form by netting against Watford at Vicarage Road, through a Mesut Özil assist, in a 3–0 Arsenal win, keeping Arsenal in second-place and grabbing his sixth goal in three Premier League matches for the club. Following a brief period on the sidelines due to injury, Sánchez returned to full first-team action on 30 January 2016 in the FA Cup fourth round tie against Burnley, scoring Arsenal's second goal of the game following a low cross from Alex Oxlade-Chamberlain. Sánchez netted his first Premier League goal since October with a goal in the North London derby against rivals Tottenham Hotspur, equalising for Arsenal in the 76th minute and keeping the Gunners' title challenge alive. During April 2016, Sánchez scored in four consecutive league matches, with goals against Watford, West Ham, Crystal Palace, and a brace against West Bromwich Albion.

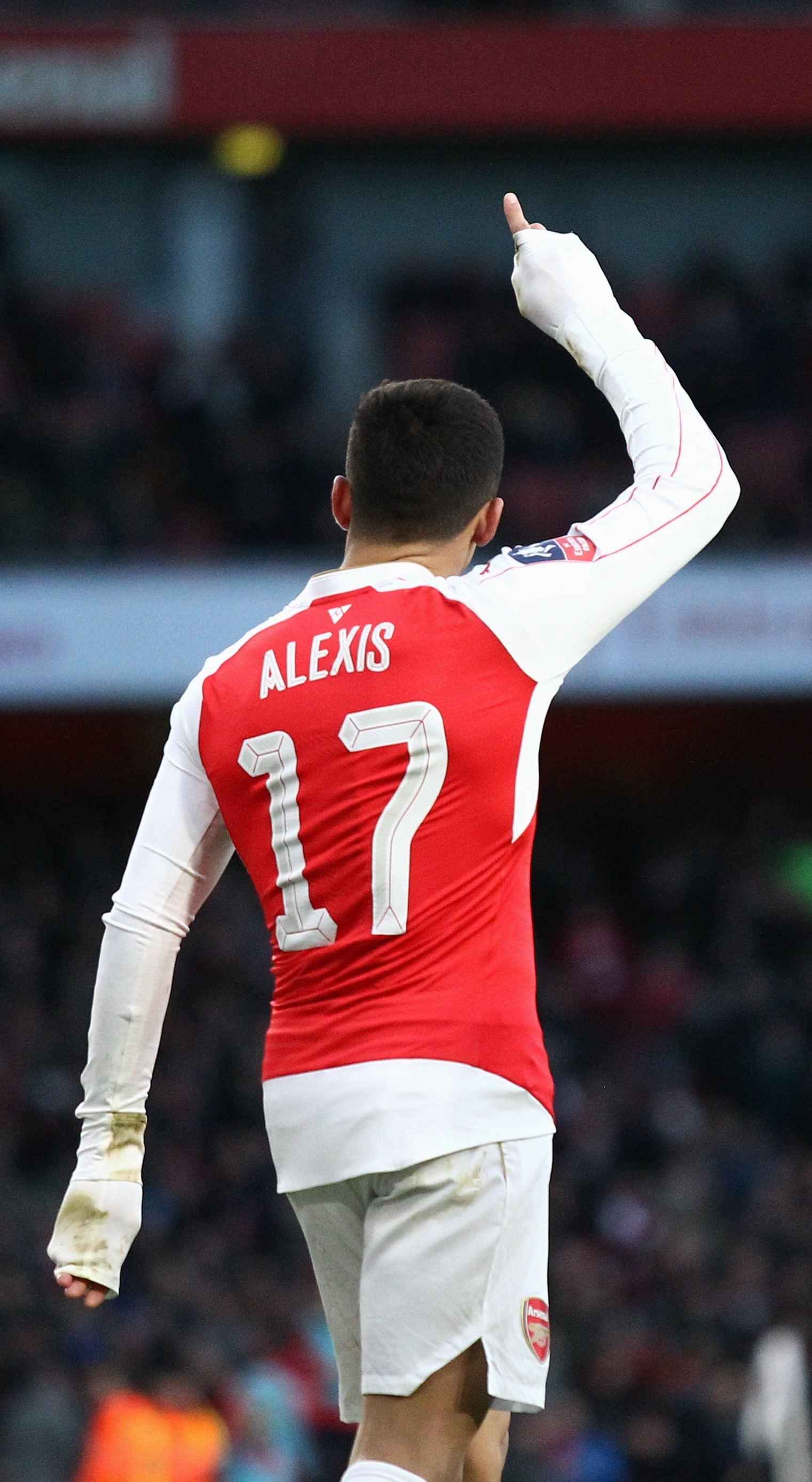
Sánchez (pictured celebrating a goal with the number 17) was given the number 7 jersey for the 2016–17 season.

When launching their new kit for the 2016–17 season, Arsenal announced that Sánchez will change squad number from 17 to 7, which was vacated by the departing Tomáš Rosický. Sánchez scored his first goal of Arsenal's campaign and grabbed his first assist in Arsenal's 3–1 away win over Watford. Sánchez scored his first Champions League goal of the campaign in a 1–1 draw with Paris Saint-Germain on 13 September 2016, latching onto Alex Iwobi's rebounded shot, to secure Arsenal a point in the French capital. Sánchez kept up his spectacular run of form throughout September by netting against Hull, then scoring and assisting in a 3–0 victory over Chelsea. He scored a brace in a 4–1 win at Sunderland's Stadium of Light, bringing his total to 50 goals in 106 appearances across all competitions for Arsenal. He also scored a hat trick and provided an assist in a man-of-the-match display in a 5–1 win at West Ham on 3 December. On 22 January 2017, Sánchez scored his first penalty for the club (having missed his previous two) against Burnley in an eventual 2–1 win, which put Arsenal into second place in the Premier League table. Sánchez scored his first goal in the season's FA Cup, in a 5–0 quarter-final win over Lincoln City, taking his tally to 21 goals for the season in all competitions. Sánchez scored the winning goal in Arsenal's 2–1 win over Manchester City, to send Arsenal through to their third FA Cup final, in four years.

On 13 April, Sánchez was included in the six player shortlist for the PFA Player of the Year. He also, in May 2017, won Arsenal's Player of the Season award. Sánchez finished off the season by claiming the man-of-the-match award and scoring Arsenal's opening goal in an eventual 2–1 win over Chelsea in the FA Cup Final, ensuring that Arsenal secured a record 13th FA Cup and that manager Arsène Wenger won a record 7th FA Cup in the process. He finished as the club's top goalscorer with 24 Premier League goals, and 30 goals in all competitions, becoming the first player since Robin van Persie in 2011–12 to score more than 20 goals in the league.

==== 2017–18: Final season ====
Sánchez returned from the 2017 Confederations Cup with an injury, and therefore had to miss the team's victory over Chelsea in the 2017 FA Community Shield and the team's opening 4–3 win over Leicester City. Sánchez' first start of the season came in the 4–0 away defeat to Liverpool. But throughout the transfer window, there was increasing speculation about his future, with a huge amount of reports stating his desire to leave, in order to play in the Champions League. A deadline day move to Manchester City was unsuccessful as Arsenal's deal for Sánchez's replacement Thomas Lemar was rejected. He scored his first goal for the season in Arsenal's 3–1 UEFA Europa League victory over German side Köln, in which he picked the ball up outside the penalty area and curled a shot past goalkeeper Timo Horn, to score Arsenal's second goal of the evening. Sánchez also played in Arsenal's 1–0 win over Doncaster Rovers in the League Cup, in which Sánchez provided his first assist of the season, by delivering a cross-field pass which Theo Walcott subsequently put past Doncaster goalkeeper, Ian Lawlor.

Sánchez scored his first Premier League goal of the season in a 5–2 win over Everton and he also provided an assist for Mesut Özil to put Arsenal ahead. Sánchez followed up this by scoring the second in Arsenal's 2–0 win against Tottenham on 18 November, and a week later scoring a decisive and controversial injury-time penalty in a 1–0 win against Burnley. Sánchez continued his fine goalscoring form by scoring Arsenal's third goal in a 5–0 rout of Huddersfield Town, his third goal in consecutive games. He also scored with a diving header in a 3–3 draw against Liverpool on 22 December. He scored his last two goals for Arsenal in a 3–2 away win against Crystal Palace on 28 December.

=== Manchester United ===
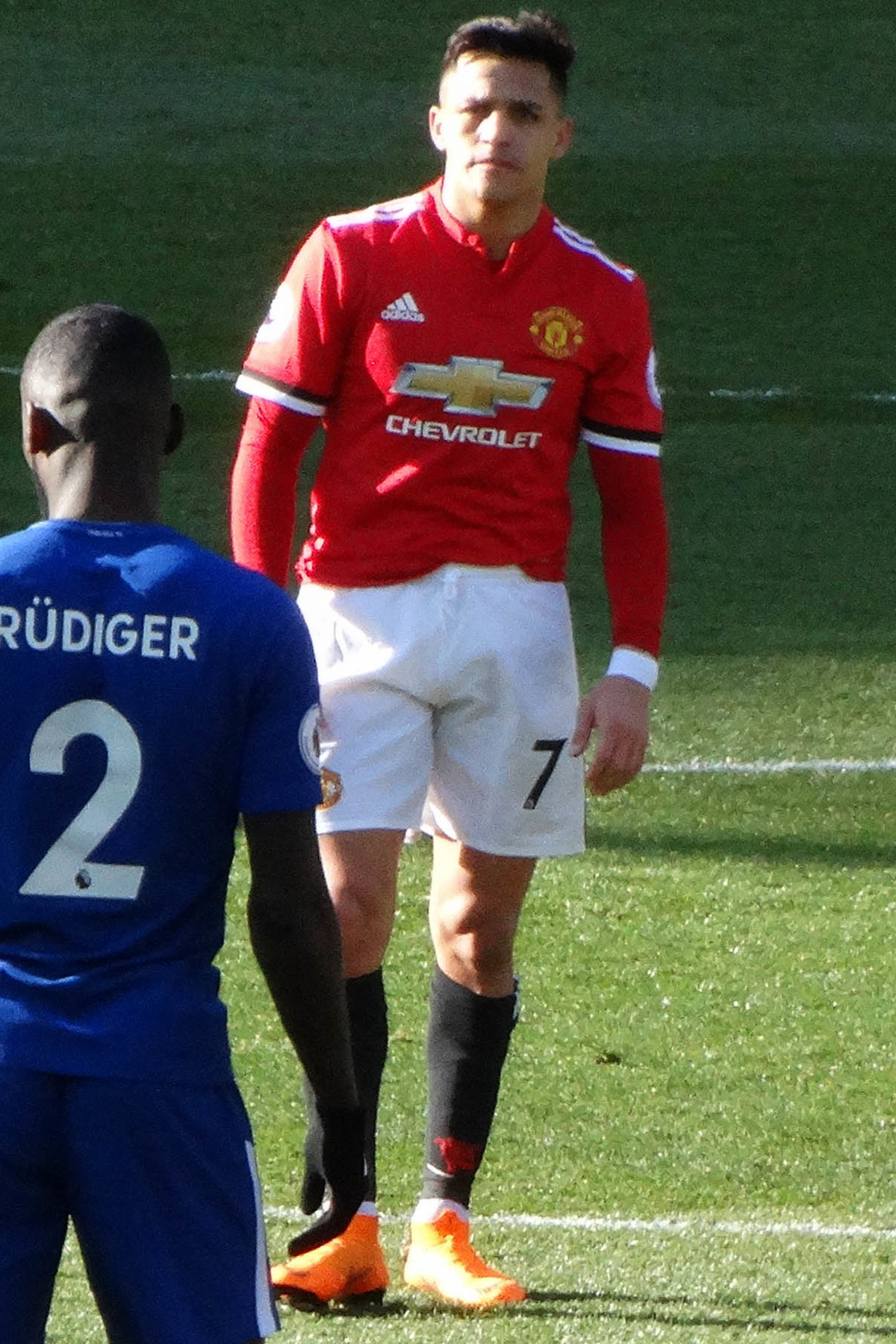
Sánchez with Manchester United in 2018

On 22 January 2018, it was announced that Sánchez had completed a transfer to Manchester United, in a swap deal that saw Henrikh Mkhitaryan move the opposite way. Sánchez was given the number 7 shirt. He made his debut for the club in a 4–0 victory against Yeovil Town in the fourth round of the FA Cup. He became the first Chilean to play a competitive match for United. He scored his first United goal on 3 February 2018 in a 2–0 home win against Huddersfield Town, after netting the rebound from his penalty, which had been saved by Jonas Lössl.

He scored his first goal of the 2018–19 season on 6 October, scoring a 90th minute winning goal to complete a 3–2 comeback win over Newcastle United, after the club initially went 2–0 down in the first ten minutes.

=== Inter Milan ===
On 29 August 2019, Sánchez joined Inter Milan on loan for the duration of the 2019–20 season. Sánchez later said on his move from Arsenal to Manchester United, "I realised a lot of things. After my first training session, I got home and told my family and my agent – can I not rip up my contract and go back to Arsenal?".

On 14 September, Sánchez made his debut for Inter when he came on as a 79th-minute substitute in a 1–0 win against his former club, Udinese. and scored his first goal two weeks later in a 3–1 win against Sampdoria, before he was sent off after receiving a second yellow card for diving inside the box.

On 6 August 2020, Sánchez signed permanently for Inter on a free transfer, signing a three-year deal. On 4 March 2021, Sánchez scored a brace in a 2–1 away win at Parma.

On 12 January 2022, Sánchez scored a late winner against Juventus in the Supercoppa Italiana to give Inter a 2–1 win. Later that year, on 8 August, Sánchez agreed to mutually terminate his contract with Inter.

=== Marseille ===
On 9 August 2022, Ligue 1 club Marseille announced that they had reached an agreement in principle with Sánchez, with the transfer dependent on the outcome of his medical. The following day, he signed a two-year contract with an option for an additional year's extension.

=== Return to Inter Milan ===
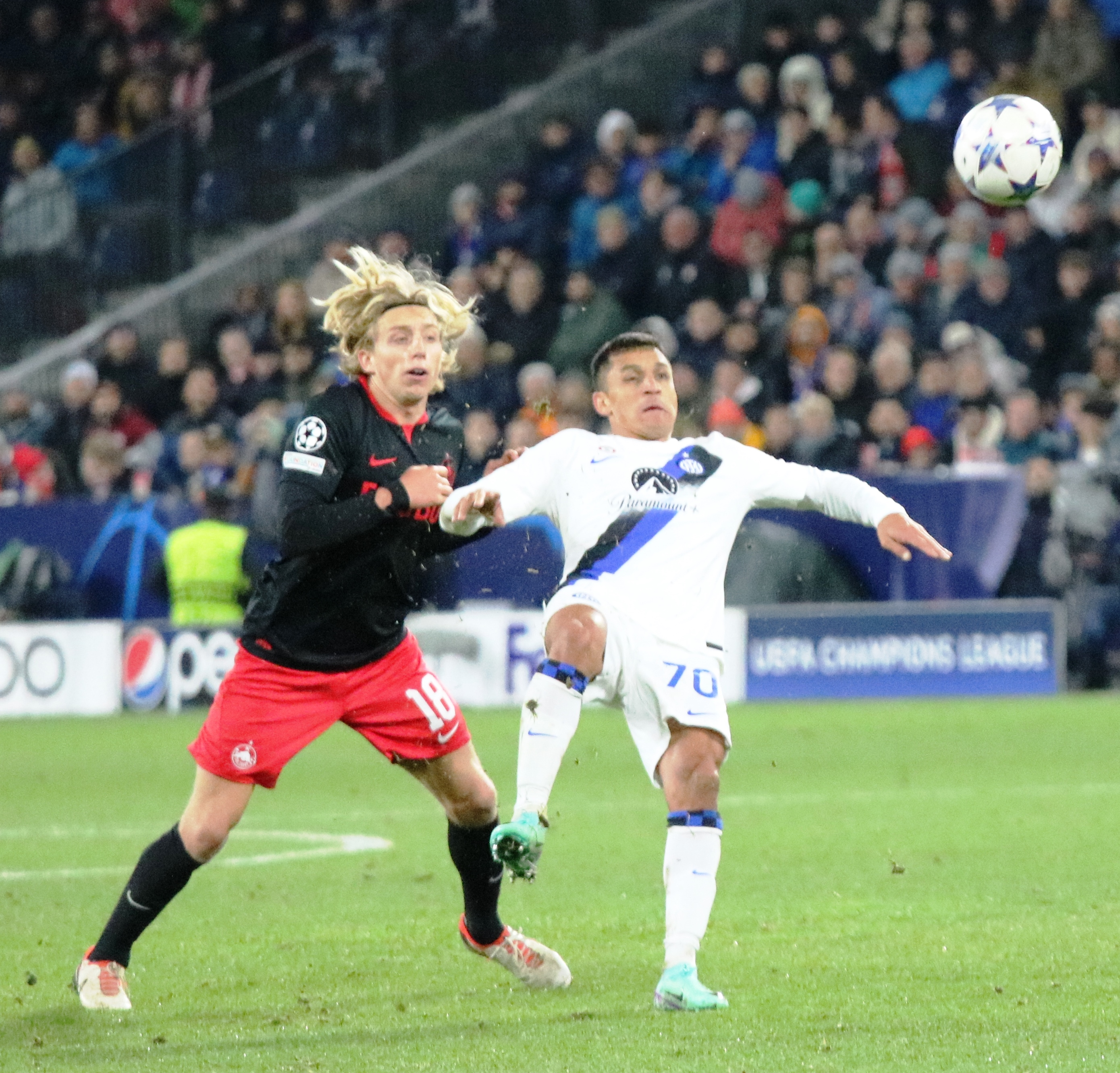
Sánchez battling FC Red Bull Salzburg's Mads Bidstrup for ball possession in October 2023

On 26 August 2023, Inter Milan announced the return of Sánchez on a free transfer, agreeing a one-season deal with the player. He won the Serie A title for the second time.

=== Return to Udinese ===
On 10 August 2024, Udinese announced the return of Sánchez on a free transfer, agreeing a two-year deal with the player.

=== Sevilla ===
On 1 September 2025, Sánchez joined La Liga side Sevilla, signing a one-season deal. Later that month, on 20 September, he scored his first goal for the club in a 2–1 away win over Alavés.

=== CF Montréal ===
On 11 August 2026, free agent Sánchez signed for Major League Soccer club CF Montréal on a two-year deal as a Designated Player.

== International career ==
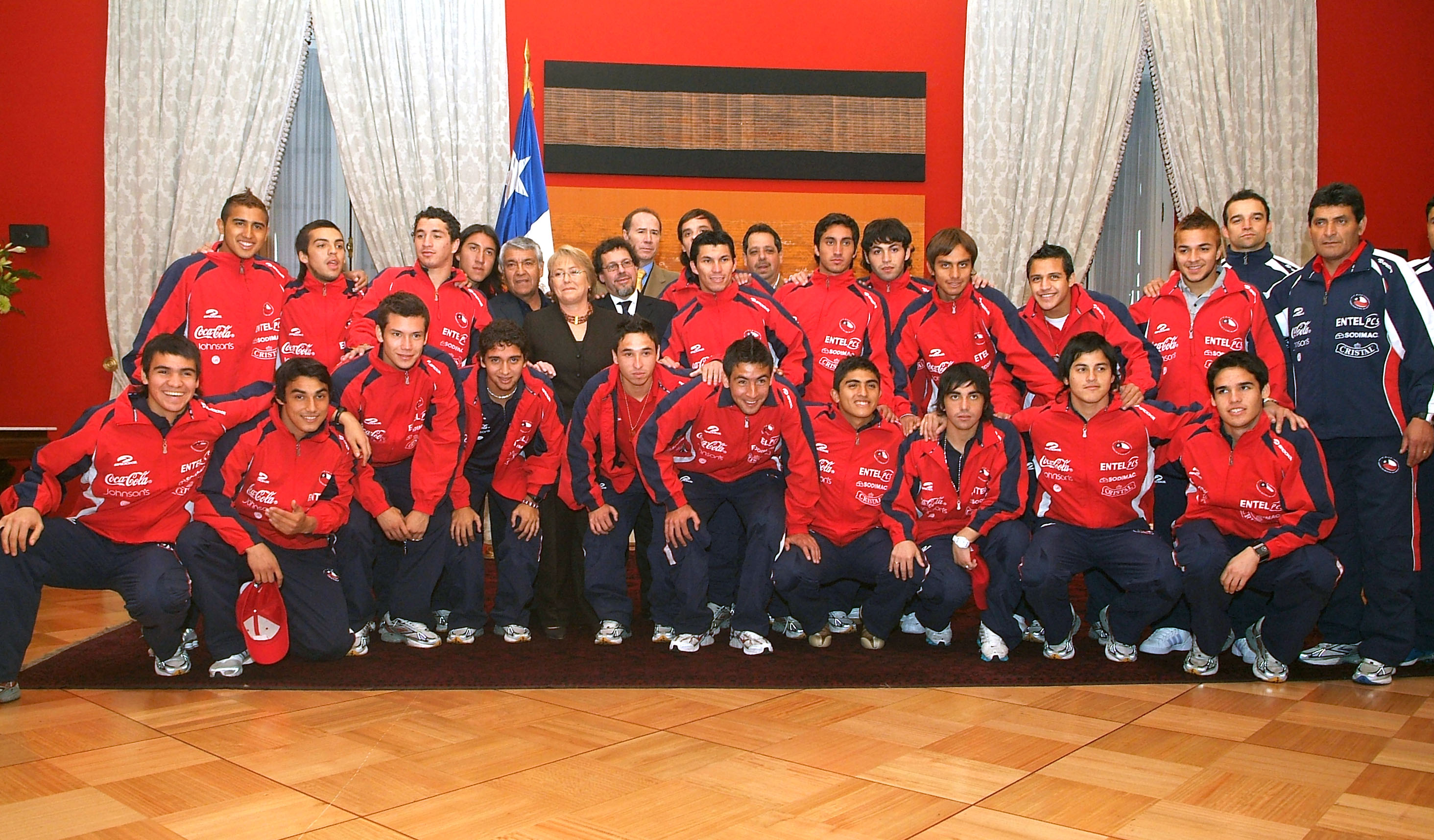
Sánchez (back row, second in red from right) with Chile Under-20 in 2007

In his early career, Sánchez took part with Chile at under-15 level in the 2004 South American Championship and with Chile U17 in the 2005 South American Championship.

Sánchez made his international debut for the Chile national team against New Zealand on 27 April 2006. He was called up by the coach José Sulantay to represent the Chilean under-20 team at the 2007 FIFA U-20 World Cup held in Canada, where they finished third.

After his participation in the youth championship, Sánchez scored his first senior international goal in a 2–1 loss against Switzerland on 7 September 2007. He scored three times during La Roja's successful 2010 FIFA World Cup qualification campaign and appeared on every match during the tournament finals. He then participated in the 2011 Copa América, scoring once in a 1–1 group stage draw with Uruguay, as Chile reached the quarter-finals. On 15 November 2013, Sánchez scored both goals as Chile beat England 2–0 at Wembley, repeating the achievement of national team legend Marcelo Salas in 1998.

=== 2014 World Cup ===
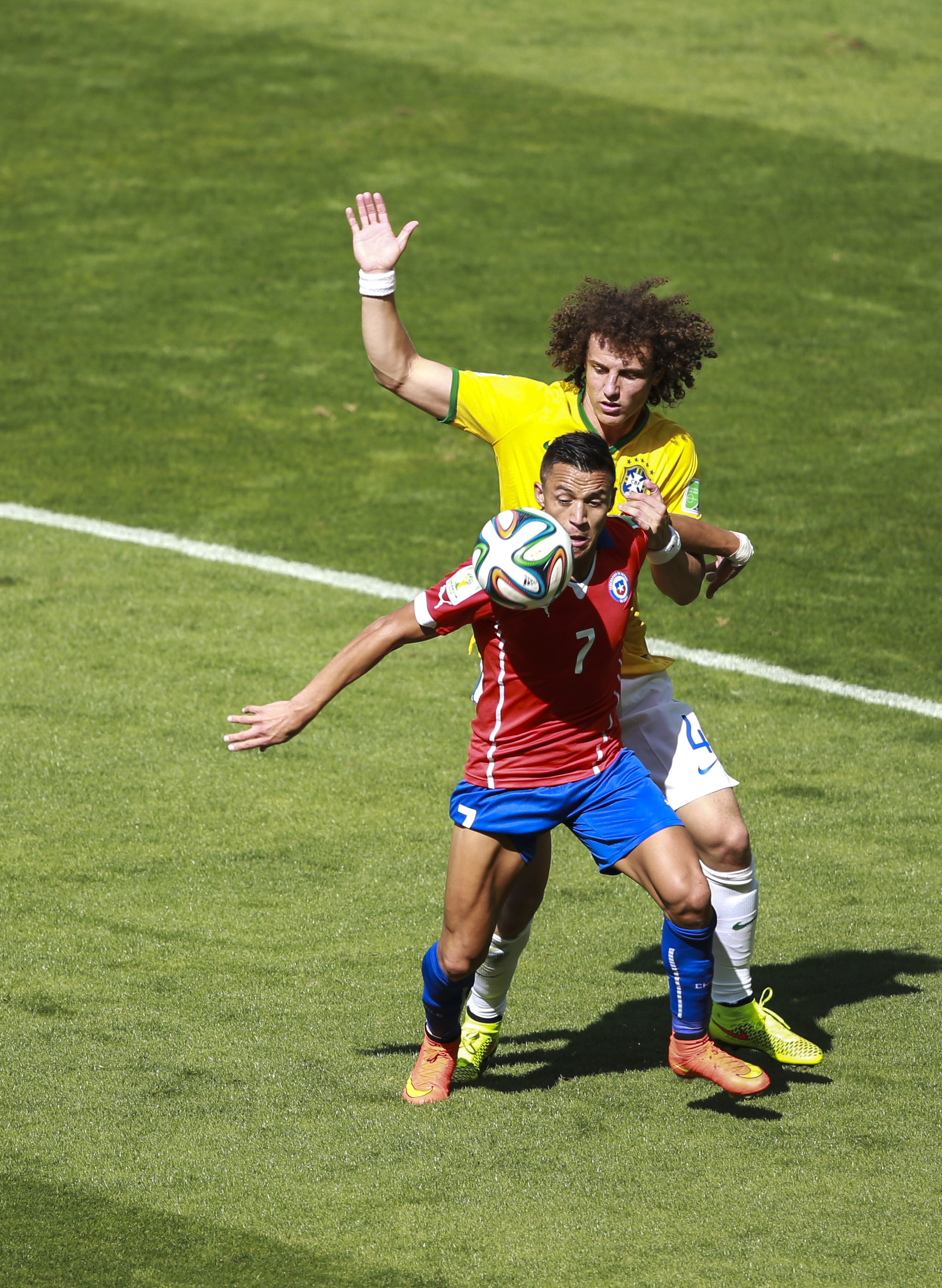
Sánchez playing against David Luiz of Brazil at the 2014 FIFA World Cup

Sánchez scored four times in Chile's qualification campaign for the 2014 FIFA World Cup.

On 13 June 2014, Sánchez scored Chile's opening goal of the 2014 World Cup, and provided an assist, in a 3–1 defeat of Australia in Cuiabá. During the round of 16, Sánchez scored the equalising goal in a 1–1 draw against the hosts Brazil. However, he was one of three Chileans to fail to convert their kicks in the penalty shoot-out, having his shot saved by Júlio César as Brazil prevailed 3–2.

=== 2015 Copa América ===
Sánchez was a member of Chile's squad as they hosted the 2015 Copa América. He assisted Eduardo Vargas in Chile's 2–0 win over Ecuador in the tournament opener, then scored a header in their final group game, a 5–0 win against Bolivia which sent Chile through as group winners – he and Arturo Vidal were rested by being substituted at half time.

Sánchez was named man of the match in Chile's ill-tempered and highly controversial quarter-final win over defending champions Uruguay. In the semi-final against Peru, he created the opening goal for Eduardo Vargas as Chile progressed to the final with a 2–1 victory. On 4 July, Sánchez converted the winning kick in the final as Chile defeated Argentina in a penalty shootout to win their first major title, executing it in the Panenka style.

=== 2018 FIFA World Cup Qualification ===
In Chile's first match of 2018 World Cup qualification on 9 October 2015, Sánchez scored in a 2–0 win over Brazil, Chile's first victory against the opponents since 2000. Four days later, he scored twice in a 4–3 win at rivals Peru.

=== Copa América Centenario ===
In June 2016, Sánchez was part of the Chile squad that defended their Copa América title at the Copa América Centenario in the United States. On 14 June, needing a draw to progress to the knockout rounds, Chile fell 1–0 behind to Panama before both Sánchez and Eduardo Vargas scored twice in a 4–2 win in Philadelphia to qualify for the tournament quarter-finals.

Four days later, he scored one goal and registered two assists at Levi's Stadium in a 7–0 rout of Mexico, who were previously on a 22-game unbeaten streak. In Chile's 2–0 semi-final victory over Colombia, he became only the second Chilean – after Claudio Bravo – to reach 100 caps. Sánchez was involved in Chile's second goal when his shot rebounded off the inside of the post and across the goal, presenting a tap-in for José Pedro Fuenzalida.

In a repeat of the previous Copa América final, Chile faced Argentina. Both teams had a player sent-off before half-time, and after a 0–0 draw, Chile were victorious via penalty kicks (4–2) to retain their title. Sánchez was awarded the Golden Ball as the tournament's best player.

=== 2017 FIFA Confederations Cup ===
In Chile's opening match of the 2017 FIFA Confederations Cup on 18 June, Sánchez, who had been recovering from an ankle injury, came off the bench to set up Arturo Vidal's opening goal in an eventual 2–0 win over Cameroon. On 22 June 2017, Sánchez became Chile's out-right all-time goalscorer when he scored the opening goal in an eventual 1–1 draw against reigning World Cup champions Germany in his team's second group match of the tournament, overtaking Marcelo Salas with his 38th international goal in 112 appearances, and also equalling Claudio Bravo as his nation's joint top appearance holder in the process. Chile defeated Portugal on penalties in the semi-final, before losing 0–1 in the final against Germany, with Sánchez coming close to an equaliser with his injury time free kick saved by German goalkeeper Marc-André ter Stegen.

=== 2019 Copa América ===
In Chile's opening match of the 2019 Copa América on 17 June, Sánchez scored a goal in a 4–0 win against Japan. In the following group match against Ecuador on 21 June, he scored again in a 2–1 victory, which enabled Chile to advance to the quarter-finals. In the quarter-finals against Colombia on 28 June, following a 0–0 draw after regulation time, he scored the winning penalty in the resulting shoot-out to send Chile to the semi-finals of the competition.

He was injured in October 2019 while on international duty with Chile.

=== 2021 Copa América ===
Sánchez was set to miss the Copa America group stage matches after suffering a foot injury in training.

His final game for Chile was in a World Cup qualifying defeat to Bolivia on 10 June 2025, which confirmed that La Roja would miss their third straight World Cup. After the game, Sánchez said: "Sad, I am feeling bad. Never lived something like this. We have to ask people to forgive us. We have to keep working. There's change already, the golden generation is buried, I am the only one left." He said in September 2025 that he would still like to play at the 2030 FIFA World Cup, when he will be 41 years old, though he has not been called up since the defeat to Bolivia.

== Style of play ==
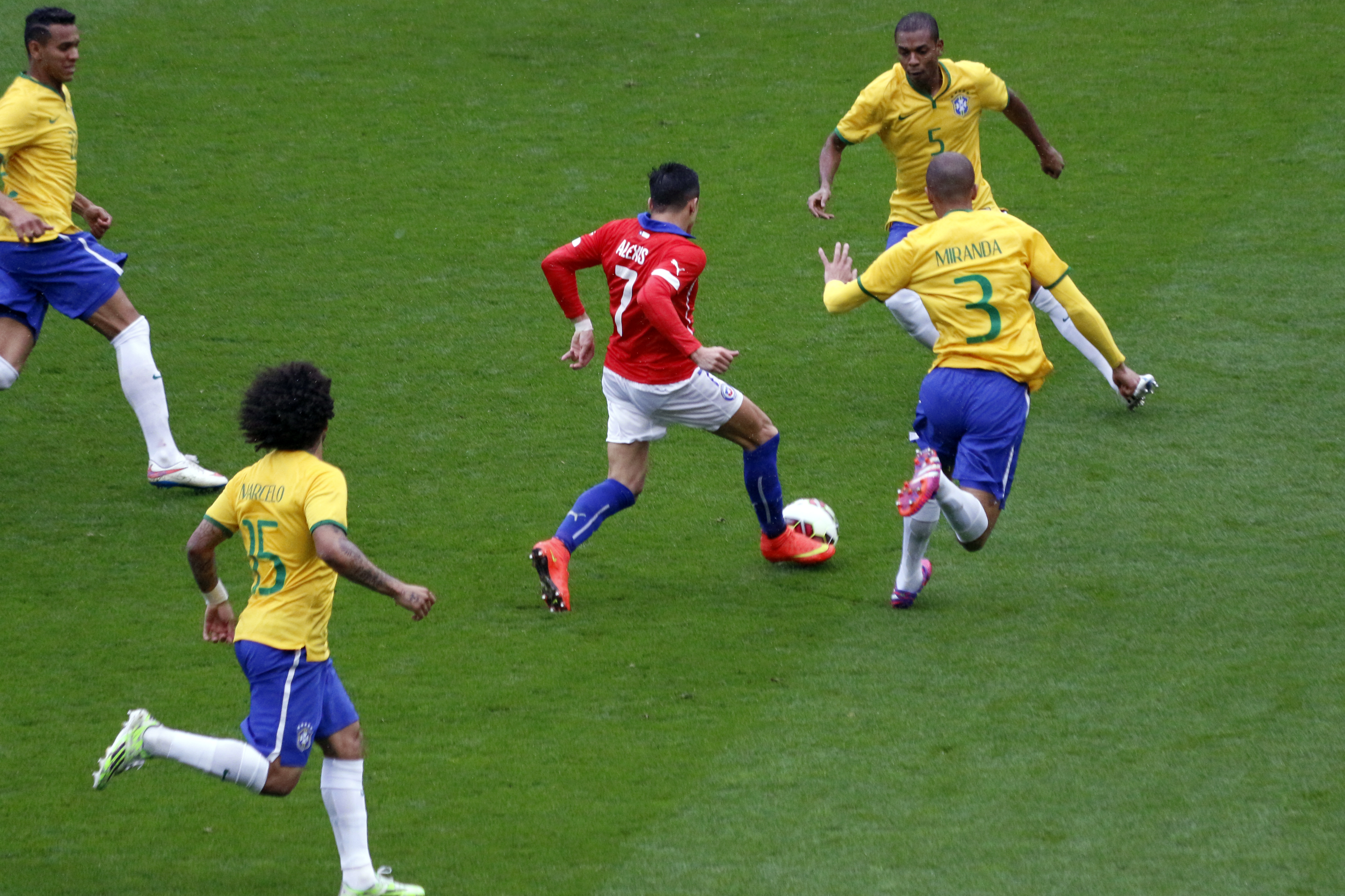
Sánchez during a friendly against Brazil in March 2015

Sánchez is a quick, creative, intelligent and hard-working player with an eye for goal, who is known in particular for his energy, strength, technical skills and work-rate on the pitch. Although naturally right-footed, due to his ability with either foot, he is capable of playing anywhere along the front line, on either flank, or through the centre of the pitch: throughout his career, he has excelled as a supporting striker, as a winger, as a false-9, and even as an attacking midfielder; he has also been deployed in a more advanced, central role, as a main striker, due to his physicality and ability to score from powerful long-distance strikes.

A talented forward, Sánchez is gifted with excellent dribbling skills, flair, finishing, vision and acceleration, which enables him to successfully take on opponents with feints in one on one situations, create space, and either score goals himself or set-up his teammates from through balls, long-range passes, or one-twos. Owing to his ability to place shots, he is also effective from set-pieces. In his prime, he was considered by pundits to be one of the best left wingers in Europe, alongside Neymar and Eden Hazard.

== Personal life ==
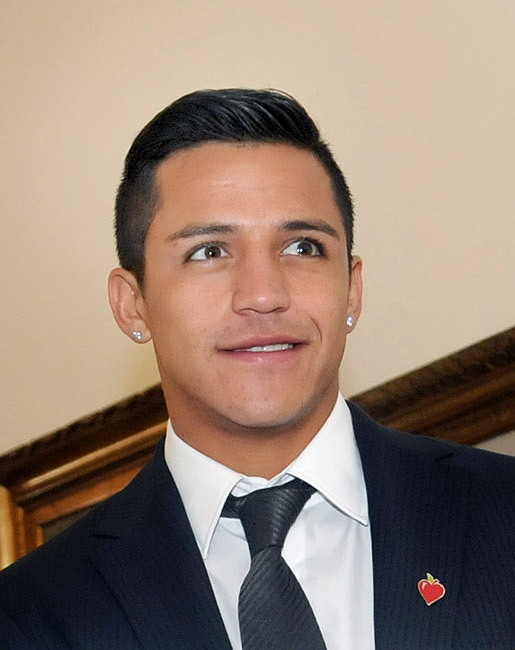
Sánchez in 2011

Sánchez had a statue erected in his honour within his native town of Tocopilla in March 2017.

In October 2015, Sánchez was named as a brand ambassador for Huawei.

In February 2017, Sánchez signed a sponsorship deal with Pepsi. In June 2022, he announced the purchase of land in Mendoza in Argentina, Maule Region in Chile and Friuli in Italy for his undertaking called Alma Soul, focused on wine production.

In July 2024, Sánchez graduated as a football instructor at INAF (National Football Institute). In December of the same year, he graduated as a football manager at the same institution.

== Career statistics ==
=== Club ===
As of match played 7 November 2026

Appearances and goals by club, season and competition
Club	Season	League			National cup (Note: Includes Coppa Italia, Copa del Rey, FA Cup, Coupe de France, Canadian Championship)		League cup (Note: Includes Football League/EFL Cup)		Continental		Other		Total	
Club	Season	Division	Apps	Goals	Apps	Goals	Apps	Goals	Apps	Goals	Apps	Goals	Apps	Goals
Cobreloa	2005	Chilean Primera División	35	3	0	0	—		3 (Note: Appearances in Copa Libertadores)	0	—		38	3
Cobreloa	2006	Chilean Primera División	12	9	0	0	—		—		—		12	9
Cobreloa	Total		47	12	0	0	—		3	0	—		50	12
Colo-Colo	2006	Chilean Primera División	18	4	0	0	—		10 (Note: Appearances in Copa Sudamericana)	1	—		28	5
Colo-Colo	2007	Chilean Primera División	14	1	0	0	—		7	3	—		21	4
Colo-Colo	Total		32	5	0	0	—		17	4	—		49	9
River Plate	2007–08	Argentine Primera División	23	4	0	0	—		8	0	—		31	4
Udinese	2008–09	Serie A	32	3	2	0	—		9 (Note: Appearances in UEFA Cup)	0	—		43	3
Udinese	2009–10	Serie A	32	5	4	1	—		—		—		36	6
Udinese	2010–11	Serie A	31	12	2	0	—		—		—		33	12
Udinese	Total		95	20	8	1	—		9	0	—		112	21
Barcelona	2011–12	La Liga	25	12	7	1	—		6 (Note: Appearances in UEFA Champions League)	2	3 (Note: One appearance in Supercopa de España, one appearance in UEFA Super Cup, one appearance in FIFA Club World Cup)	0	41	15
Barcelona	2012–13	La Liga	29	8	6	2	—		9	1	2 (Note: Appearances in Supercopa de España)	0	46	11
Barcelona	2013–14	La Liga	34	19	9	2	—		9	0	2	0	54	21
Barcelona	Total		88	39	22	5	—		24	3	7	0	141	47
Arsenal	2014–15	Premier League	35	16	6	4	1	1	9	4	1 (Note: Appearance in FA Community Shield)	0	52	25
Arsenal	2015–16	Premier League	30	13	3	1	1	0	7	3	0	0	41	17
Arsenal	2016–17	Premier League	38	24	5	3	0	0	8	3	—		51	30
Arsenal	2017–18	Premier League	19	7	0	0	2	0	1 (Note: Appearance in UEFA Europa League)	1	0	0	22	8
Arsenal	Total		122	60	14	8	4	1	25	11	1	0	166	80
Manchester United	2017–18	Premier League	12	2	4	1	—		2	0	—		18	3
Manchester United	2018–19	Premier League	20	1	3	1	0	0	4	0	—		27	2
Manchester United	Total		32	3	7	2	0	0	6	0	—		45	5
Inter Milan (loan)	2019–20	Serie A	22	4	4	0	—		6 (Note: One appearance in UEFA Champions League, five appearances in UEFA Europa League)	0	—		32	4
Inter Milan	2020–21	Serie A	30	7	3	0	—		5	0	—		38	7
Inter Milan	2021–22	Serie A	27	5	5	2	—		6	1	1 (Note: Appearance(s) in Supercoppa Italiana)	1	39	9
Inter Milan	Total		79	16	12	2	—		17	1	1	1	109	20
Marseille	2022–23	Ligue 1	35	14	4	2	—		5	2	—		44	18
Inter Milan	2023–24	Serie A	23	2	0	0	—		8	2	2	0	33	4
Udinese	2024–25	Serie A	13	0	1	0	—		—		—		14	0
Sevilla	2025–26	La Liga	28	4	2	0	—		—		—		30	4
CF Montréal	2026	Major League Soccer	15	0	2	0	—		—		—		17	0
Career total			632	179	72	20	4	1	122	23	11	1	841	224

=== International ===
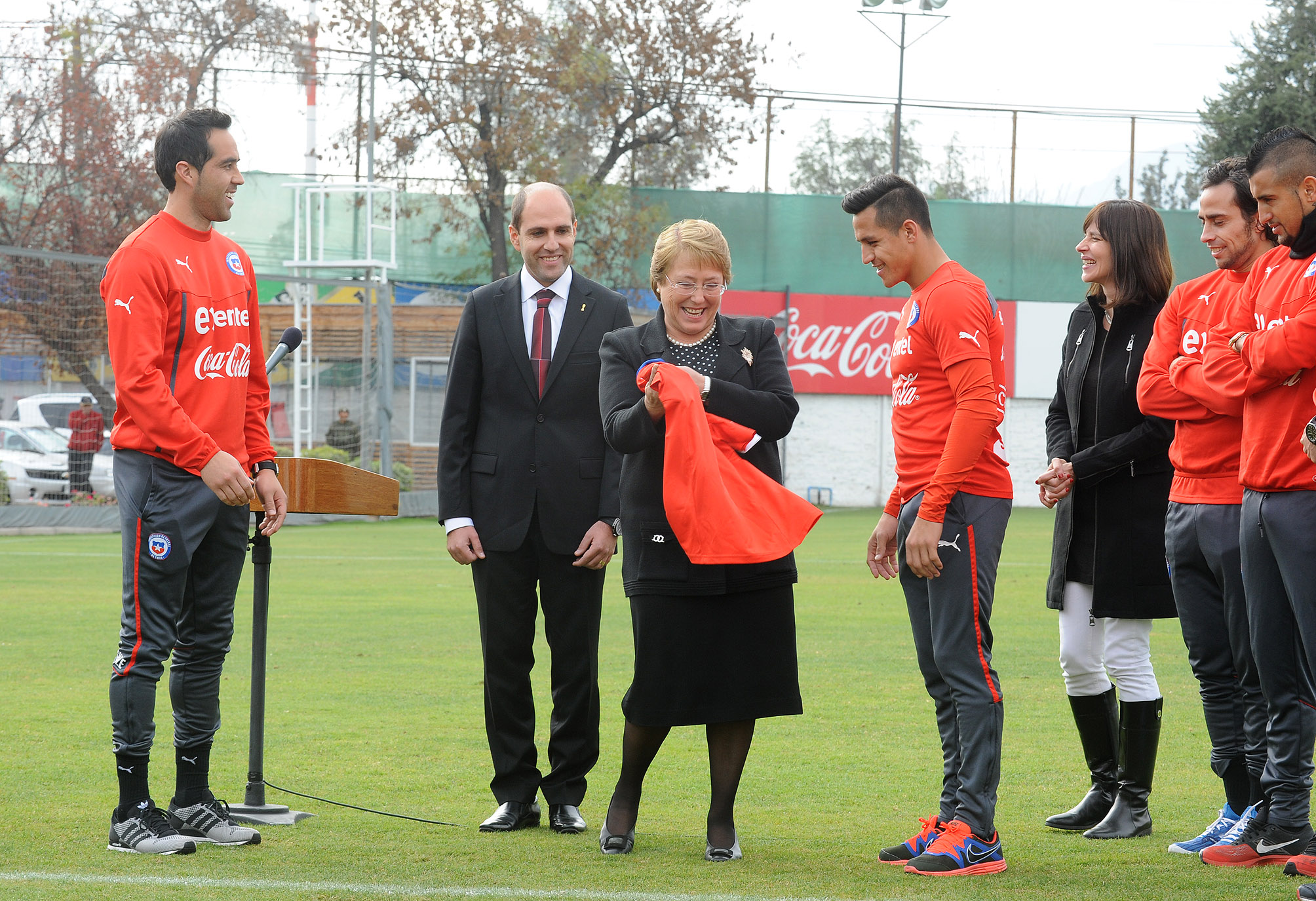
Sánchez (right) meeting Chilean President Michelle Bachelet, alongside his compatriots in 2014

As of match played 10 June 2025

Appearances and goals by national team and year
National team	Year	Apps	Goals
Chile	2006	5	0
Chile	2007	4	1
Chile	2008	9	2
Chile	2009	9	5
Chile	2010	7	4
Chile	2011	11	2
Chile	2012	8	0
Chile	2013	11	8
Chile	2014	13	4
Chile	2015	14	5
Chile	2016	15	5
Chile	2017	13	3
Chile	2018	5	2
Chile	2019	8	2
Chile	2020	4	2
Chile	2021	8	2
Chile	2022	8	3
Chile	2023	8	1
Chile	2024	6	0
Chile	2025	2	0
Total		168	51

== Honours ==
Colo-Colo

- Primera División de Chile: 2006 Clausura, 2007 Apertura
- Copa Sudamericana runner-up: 2006

River Plate

- Argentine Primera División: 2008 Clausura

Barcelona

- La Liga: 2012–13
- Copa del Rey: 2011–12
- Supercopa de España: 2011, 2013
- UEFA Super Cup: 2011
- FIFA Club World Cup: 2011

Arsenal

- FA Cup: 2014–15, 2016–17
- FA Community Shield: 2014

Manchester United

- FA Cup runner-up: 2017–18

Inter Milan

- Serie A: 2020–21, 2023–24
- Coppa Italia: 2021–22
- Supercoppa Italiana: 2021, 2023
- UEFA Europa League runner-up: 2019–20

CF Montréal

- Canadian Championship runner-up: 2026

Chile

- Copa América: 2015, 2016
- FIFA Confederations Cup runner-up: 2017

Individual

- Serie A Player of the Month: February 2011
- PFA Fans' Player of the Year: 2015
- PFA Team of the Year: 2014–15 Premier League
- Ballon d'Or tenth place: 2015
- PFA Fans' Premier League Player of the Month: October 2014, October 2015
- BBC Goal of the Month: October 2015
- Arsenal Player of the Season Award: 2014–15, 2016–17
- FSF Player of the Year: 2015
- Facebook FA Premier League Player of the Year: 2015
- Kids' Choice Awards Favorite UK Footballer: 2015
- UEFA Champions League top assist provider: 2015–16
- CIES Football Observatory Best Premier League Forward: 2015–16
- Copa América Golden Ball: 2016
- Copa América Team of the Tournament: 2016
- FIFA Confederations Cup Silver Ball: 2017
- Marseille Player of the Season: 2022–23

Records

- Chile all-time top goalscorer: 51 goals
- Chile most appearances: 168 caps

== See also ==
- List of men's footballers with 1,000 or more official appearances
- List of top international men's football goal scorers by country
- List of men's footballers with 100 or more international caps
- List of men's footballers with 50 or more international goals
