= Cristián Muñoz =

Cristián Muñoz may refer to:

- Cristián Muñoz (footballer, born 1977), Argentine-born Chilean football goalkeeper
- Cristián Muñoz (footballer, born 1983), Chilean football manager and football midfielder
- Cristian Muñoz (racewalker), Chilean racewalker
- Cristian Camilo Muñoz (1996–2026), Colombian cyclist
