= List of international goals scored by Alexis Sánchez =

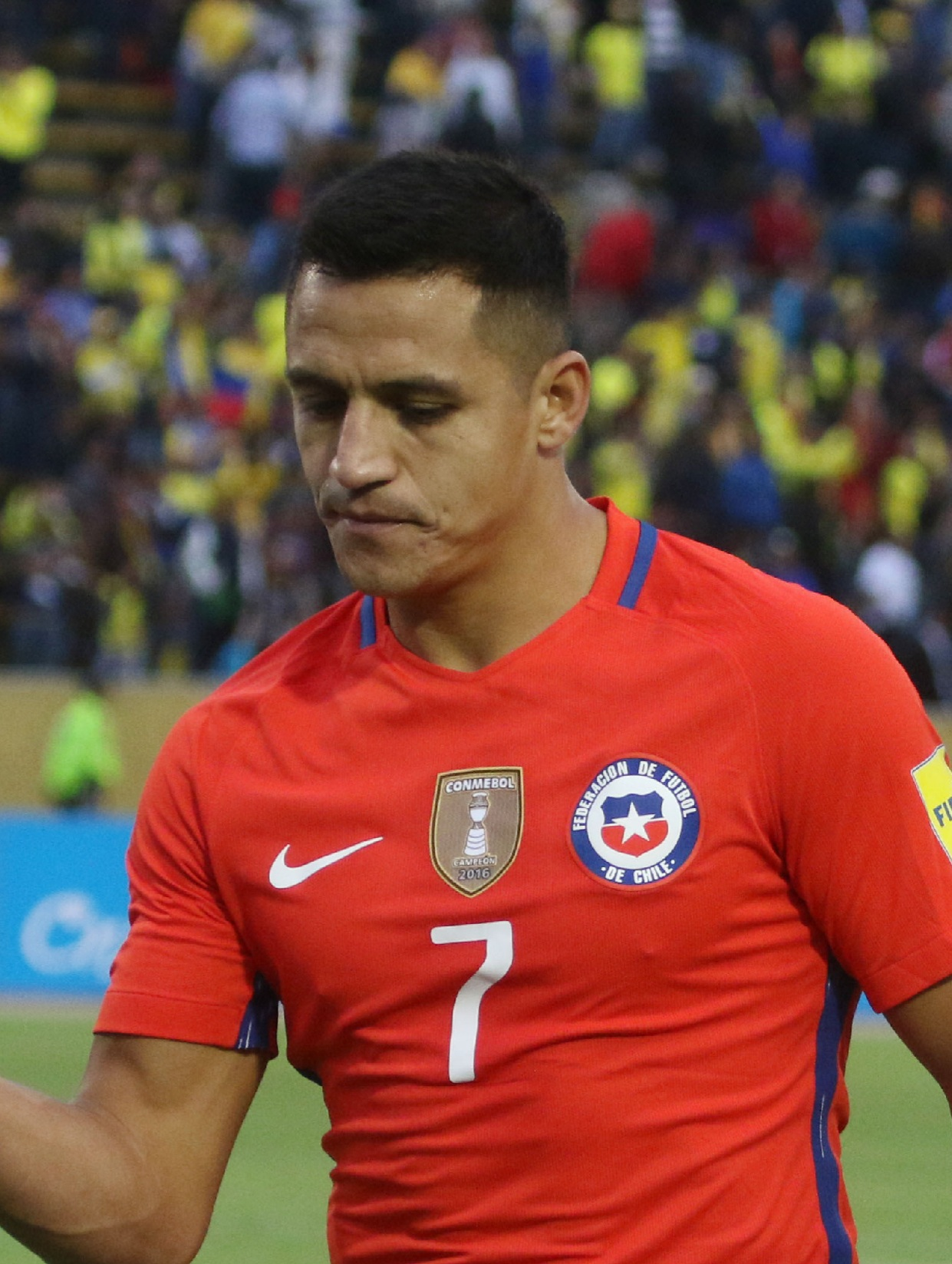
Sánchez with Chile in 2016

Alexis Sánchez is a Chilean professional footballer who represents the Chile national team as a striker. Nicknamed El Niño Maravilla ("The Boy Wonder"), he made his debut for his country in a 1–0 victory over New Zealand in April 2006. His first international goal came on his eighth appearance for Chile when he scored Chile's only goal in a 1–2 defeat to Switzerland in a friendly tournament in Vienna. As of June 2025, Sánchez is his country's top scorer and also has the most caps, with 51 goals in 168 appearances. He passed the previous record of 37 goals, held by Marcelo Salas, when he scored the opener against Germany in the group stage of the 2017 FIFA Confederations Cup in June 2017. Sánchez's most recent goal came against Paraguay in a 3–2 friendly win. Despite Sánchez scoring seven goals, making him second-equal top scorer in 2018 FIFA World Cup qualifying (along with Lionel Messi, Gabriel Jesus and Felipe Caicedo), Chile failed to qualify for the finals. Sánchez made his most recent and 168th appearance for Chile in a 0–2 World Cup qualifying loss against Bolivia in June 2025.

As of June 2025, Sánchez has not scored an international hat-trick, but has scored twice in a match on ten occasions. Sánchez has scored more goals in friendlies than in any other format with 21, followed by FIFA World Cup qualifying matches with twenty. He has scored two goals in FIFA World Cup finals, seven in the Copa América and one in the Confederations Cup. He has scored more goals against Uruguay and Bolivia (six each) than any other nation, and more times at the Estadio Nacional de Chile (ten) than any other stadium.

== Goals ==
As of 27 March 2023
Scores and results list Chile's goal tally first.

International goals by cap, date, venue, opponent, score, result and competition
No.	Cap	Date	Venue	Opponent	Score	Result	Competition	Ref.
1	8	7 September 2007	Ernst-Happel-Stadion, Vienna, Austria	Switzerland	1–1	1–2	Friendly	
2	11	4 June 2008	Estadio El Teniente, Rancagua, Chile	Guatemala	1–0	2–0	Friendly	
3	11	4 June 2008	Estadio El Teniente, Rancagua, Chile	Guatemala	2–0	2–0	Friendly	
4	19	11 February 2009	Peter Mokaba Stadium, Polokwane, South Africa	South Africa	2–0	2–0	Friendly	
5	20	28 March 2009	Estadio Monumental "U", Lima, Peru	Peru	1–0	3–1	2010 FIFA World Cup qualification	
6	23	10 June 2009	Estadio Nacional de Chile, Santiago, Chile	Bolivia	3–0	4–0	2010 FIFA World Cup qualification	
7	23	10 June 2009	Estadio Nacional de Chile, Santiago, Chile	Bolivia	4–0	4–0	2010 FIFA World Cup qualification	
8	24	12 August 2009	Brøndby Stadium, Brøndby, Denmark	Denmark	2–1	2–1	Friendly	
9	28	26 May 2010	Estadio Municipal de Calama, Calama, Chile	Zambia	1–0	3–0	Friendly	
10	28	26 May 2010	Estadio Municipal de Calama, Calama, Chile	Zambia	2–0	3–0	Friendly	
11	29	30 May 2010	Estadio Municipal de Concepción, Concepción, Chile	Israel	2–0	3–0	Friendly	
12	34	17 November 2010	Estadio Monumental David Arellano, Santiago, Chile	Uruguay	1–0	2–0	Friendly	
13	37	19 June 2011	Estadio Monumental David Arellano, Santiago, Chile	Estonia	4–0	4–0	Friendly	
14	39	8 July 2011	Estadio Malvinas Argentinas, Mendoza, Argentina	Uruguay	1–1	1–1	2011 Copa América	
15	57	11 June 2013	Estadio Nacional de Chile, Santiago, Chile	Bolivia	2–0	3–1	2014 FIFA World Cup qualification	
16	58	14 August 2013	Brøndby Stadium, Brøndby, Denmark	Iraq	2–0	6–0	Friendly	
17	58	14 August 2013	Brøndby Stadium, Brøndby, Denmark	Iraq	3–0	6–0	Friendly	
18	61	11 October 2013	Estadio Metropolitano Roberto Meléndez, Barranquilla, Colombia	Colombia	2–0	3–3	2014 FIFA World Cup qualification	
19	61	11 October 2013	Estadio Metropolitano Roberto Meléndez, Barranquilla, Colombia	Colombia	3–0	3–3	2014 FIFA World Cup qualification	
20	62	15 October 2013	Estadio Nacional de Chile, Santiago, Chile	Ecuador	1–0	2–1	2014 FIFA World Cup qualification	
21	63	15 November 2013	Wembley Stadium, London, England	England	1–0	2–0	Friendly	
22	63	15 November 2013	Wembley Stadium, London, England	England	2–0	2–0	Friendly	
23	68	13 June 2014	Arena Pantanal, Cuiabá, Brazil	Australia	1–0	3–1	2014 FIFA World Cup	
24	71	28 June 2014	Mineirão, Belo Horizonte, Brazil	Brazil	1–1	1–1	2014 FIFA World Cup	
25	76	14 November 2014	Estadio CAP, Talcahuano, Chile	Venezuela	1–0	5–0	Friendly	
26	77	18 November 2014	Estadio Monumental David Arellano, Santiago, Chile	Uruguay	1–0	1–2	Friendly	
27	83	20 June 2015	Estadio Nacional de Chile, Santiago, Chile	Bolivia	2–0	5–0	2015 Copa América	
28	87	5 September 2015	Estadio Nacional de Chile, Santiago, Chile	Paraguay	3–2	3–2	Friendly	
29	88	8 October 2015	Estadio Nacional de Chile, Santiago, Chile	Brazil	2–0	2–0	2018 FIFA World Cup qualification	
30	89	13 October 2015	Estadio Nacional de Lima, Lima, Peru	Peru	1–0	4–3	2018 FIFA World Cup qualification	
31	89	13 October 2015	Estadio Nacional de Lima, Lima, Peru	Peru	3–2	4–3	2018 FIFA World Cup qualification	
32	98	14 June 2016	Lincoln Financial Field, Philadelphia, United States	Panama	3–1	4–2	Copa América Centenario	
33	98	14 June 2016	Lincoln Financial Field, Philadelphia, United States	Panama	4–2	4–2	Copa América Centenario	
34	99	18 June 2016	Levi's Stadium, Santa Clara, United States	Mexico	3–0	7–0	Copa América Centenario	
35	106	15 November 2016	Estadio Nacional de Chile, Santiago, Chile	Uruguay	2–1	3–1	2018 FIFA World Cup qualification	
36	106	15 November 2016	Estadio Nacional de Chile, Santiago, Chile	Uruguay	3–1	3–1	2018 FIFA World Cup qualification	
37	108	28 March 2017	Estadio Monumental David Arellano, Santiago, Chile	Venezuela	1–0	3–1	2018 FIFA World Cup qualification	
38	112	22 June 2017	Kazan Arena, Kazan, Russia	Germany	1–0	1–1	2017 FIFA Confederations Cup	
39	118	5 October 2017	Estadio Monumental David Arellano, Santiago, Chile	Ecuador	2–1	2–1	2018 FIFA World Cup qualification	
40	123	16 November 2018	Estadio El Teniente, Rancagua, Chile	Costa Rica	2–3	2–3	Friendly	
41	124	20 November 2018	Estadio Germán Becker, Temuco, Chile	Honduras	3–1	4–1	Friendly	
42	125	17 June 2019	Estádio do Morumbi, São Paulo, Brazil	Japan	3–0	4–0	2019 Copa América	
43	126	21 June 2019	Itaipava Arena Fonte Nova, Salvador, Brazil	Ecuador	2–1	2–1	2019 Copa América	
44	133	8 October 2020	Estadio Centenario, Montevideo, Uruguay	Uruguay	1–1	1–2	2022 FIFA World Cup qualification	
45	134	13 October 2020	Estadio Nacional de Chile, Santiago, Chile	Colombia	2–1	2–2	2022 FIFA World Cup qualification	
46	137	3 June 2021	Estadio Único Madre de Ciudades, Santiago del Estero, Argentina	Argentina	1–1	1–1	2022 FIFA World Cup qualification	
47	143	11 November 2021	Estadio Defensores del Chaco, Asunción, Paraguay	Paraguay	1–0	1–0	2022 FIFA World Cup qualification	
48	146	1 February 2022	Estadio Hernando Siles, La Paz, Bolivia	Bolivia	1–0	3–2	2022 FIFA World Cup qualification	
49	146	1 February 2022	Estadio Hernando Siles, La Paz, Bolivia	Bolivia	3–1	3–2	2022 FIFA World Cup qualification	
50	150	27 September 2022	Franz Horr Stadium, Vienna, Austria	Qatar	1–0	2–2	Friendly	
51	153	27 March 2023	Estadio Monumental David Arellano, Santiago, Chile	Paraguay	2–2	3–2	Friendly	

== Statistics ==
As of match played 10 June 2025

Appearances and goals by year
Year	Apps	Goals
2006	5	0
2007	4	1
2008	9	2
2009	9	5
2010	7	4
2011	11	2
2012	8	0
2013	11	8
2014	13	4
2015	14	5
2016	15	5
2017	13	3
2018	5	2
2019	8	2
2020	4	2
2021	8	2
2022	8	3
2023	8	1
2024	6	0
2025	2	0
Total	168	51

Goals by competition
Competition	Goals
Friendlies	21
FIFA World Cup qualifiers	20
Copa América	7
FIFA World Cup finals	2
FIFA Confederations Cup	1
Total	51

Goals by opponent
Opponent	Goals
Bolivia	6
Uruguay	6
Colombia	3
Ecuador	3
Paraguay	3
Peru	3
Brazil	2
England	2
Guatemala	2
Iraq	2
Panama	2
Venezuela	2
Zambia	2
Argentina	1
Australia	1
Costa Rica	1
Denmark	1
Estonia	1
Germany	1
Honduras	1
Israel	1
Japan	1
Mexico	1
Qatar	1
South Africa	1
Switzerland	1
Total	51

== See also ==
- List of men's footballers with 50 or more international goals
- List of top international men's football goal scorers by country
- List of men's footballers with 100 or more international caps
