= 2006 Campeonato Nacional Primera División =

The 2006 Primera División de Chile season was both 79th and 80th season of top-flight football in Chile.

== Torneo Apertura ==
Torneo Apertura
- Season: 2006
- Champions: Colo-Colo; 24th title
- 2007 Copa Libertadores: Colo-Colo
- Copa Sudamericana: Colo-Colo; Huachipato
- Matches: 187
- Goals: 571 (3.05 per match)
- Top goalscorer: Humberto Suazo (19 goals)
- Biggest home win: Colo-Colo 7–2 Rangers (2 April)
- Biggest away win: Palestino 1–5 Puerto Montt (31 March)
- Longest winning run: 8 matches Colo-Colo
- Longest unbeaten run: 9 matches Universidad de Chile
- Longest winless run: 9 matches Santiago Morning
- Longest losing run: 4 matches Santiago Morning
- Highest attendance: 61,000; Colo-Colo 0–1 Universidad de Chile

The 2006 Torneo Apertura was the first tournament in the 2006 season of the Chilean Primera División. The tournament also was known as Copa Banco Estado for sponsorship reasons.

The defending champions is Universidad Católica that won their 9th Primera División title the last season, after defeat Universidad de Chile in the playoffs finals.

=== Qualification stage ===
==== Group standings ====
Group A
Pos	Team	Pld	W	D	L	GF	GA	GD	Pts	Qualification
1	Universidad de Concepción	18	9	6	3	31	23	+8	33	Qualify to the playoffs
2	Audax Italiano	18	9	5	4	32	22	+10	32	Qualify to the playoffs
3	Universidad Católica	18	9	5	4	27	20	+7	32	Qualify to the repechaje
4	Cobresal	18	6	4	8	26	32	−6	22	
5	Santiago Wanderers	18	5	2	11	16	30	−14	17	

Group B
Pos	Team	Pld	W	D	L	GF	GA	GD	Pts	Qualification
1	Universidad de Chile	18	10	5	3	27	20	+7	35	Qualify to the playoffs
2	La Serena	18	5	7	6	32	31	+1	22	Qualify to the repechaje
3	Everton	18	5	6	7	20	27	−7	21	
4	Coquimbo Unido	18	3	8	7	16	26	−10	17	
5	Santiago Morning	18	2	6	10	15	31	−16	12	

Group C
Pos	Team	Pld	W	D	L	GF	GA	GD	Pts	Qualification
1	Colo-Colo	18	13	1	4	54	22	+32	40	Qualify to the playoffs
2	Cobreloa	18	9	3	6	32	24	+8	30	Qualify to the playoffs
3	Unión Española	18	8	4	6	24	21	+3	28	Qualify to the repechaje
4	Deportes Antofagasta	18	5	6	7	26	31	−5	21	
5	Deportes Puerto Montt	18	4	5	9	33	32	+1	17	

Group D
Pos	Team	Pld	W	D	L	GF	GA	GD	Pts	Qualification
1	Huachipato	18	11	3	4	32	19	+13	36	Qualify to the playoffs
2	O'Higgins	18	5	6	7	26	31	−5	21	Qualify to the repechaje
3	Palestino	18	4	4	10	22	35	−13	16	
4	Rangers	18	4	4	10	26	40	−14	16	

==== Repechaje ====
Match	Home	Visitor	Result
1	Unión Española *	Deportes La Serena	2–2
2	Universidad Católica *	O'Higgins	1–1

* both teams qualified due to better position in the Regular season

=== Aggregate table ===
Pos	Team	Pld	W	D	L	GF	GA	GD	Pts	Qualification
1	Colo-Colo	18	13	1	4	54	22	+32	40	Copa Sudamericana First Stage
2	Huachipato	18	11	3	4	32	19	+13	36	Copa Sudamericana Preliminary Stage
3	Universidad de Chile	18	10	5	3	27	20	+7	35	
4	Universidad de Concepción	18	9	6	3	31	23	+8	33	
5	Audax Italiano	18	9	5	4	32	22	+10	32	
6	Universidad Católica	18	9	5	4	27	20	+7	32	
7	Cobreloa	18	9	3	6	32	24	+8	30	
8	Unión Española	18	8	4	6	24	21	+3	28	
9	Deportes La Serena	18	5	7	6	32	31	+1	22	
10	Cobresal	18	6	4	8	26	32	−6	22	
11	O'Higgins	18	5	6	7	26	31	−5	21	
12	Everton	18	5	6	7	20	27	−7	21	
13	Deportes Antofagasta	18	5	6	7	26	31	−5	21	
14	Deportes Puerto Montt	18	4	5	9	33	32	+1	17	
15	Coquimbo Unido	18	3	8	7	16	26	−10	17	
16	Santiago Wanderers	18	5	2	11	16	30	−14	17	
17	Palestino	18	4	4	10	22	35	−13	16	
18	Rangers	18	4	4	10	26	40	−14	16	
19	Santiago Morning	18	2	6	10	15	31	−16	12	

=== Playoffs ===
Quarterfinals
2	Huachipato	1	4	5
7	Cobreloa	3	0	3
3	Universidad de Chile	2	3	5
5	Universidad Católica	2	1	3
4	U. de Concepción	2	2	4
5	Audax Italiano	1	0	1
1	Colo-Colo	4	5	9
8	Unión Española	0	0	0

Semifinals
2	Huachipato	1	2	3
3	Universidad de Chile	6	2	8
4	U. de Concepción	3	0	3
1	Colo-Colo	4	2	6

Finals
3	Universidad de Chile	1	1	2 (2)
1	Colo-Colo	2	0	2 (4)

2006 Apertura winners
Colo-Colo
24th title

=== Top goalscorers ===
Rank	Player	Club	Goals
1	(Chile) Humberto Suazo	Colo-Colo	19
2	(Chile) Matías Fernández	Colo-Colo	14
3	(Chile) Juan Quiroga	Cobresal	13
3	(Chile) Leonardo Monje	Deportes Puerto Montt	13
4	(Chile) Rodrigo Millar	Huachipato	12
4	(Chile) Héctor Mancilla	Colo-Colo	12
5	(Colombia) Herly Alcázar	Universidad de Chile	11
6	(Argentina) José Luis Díaz	Cobreloa	10
6	(Chile) Carlos Villanueva	Audax Italiano	10

== Torneo Clausura ==
Torneo Clausura
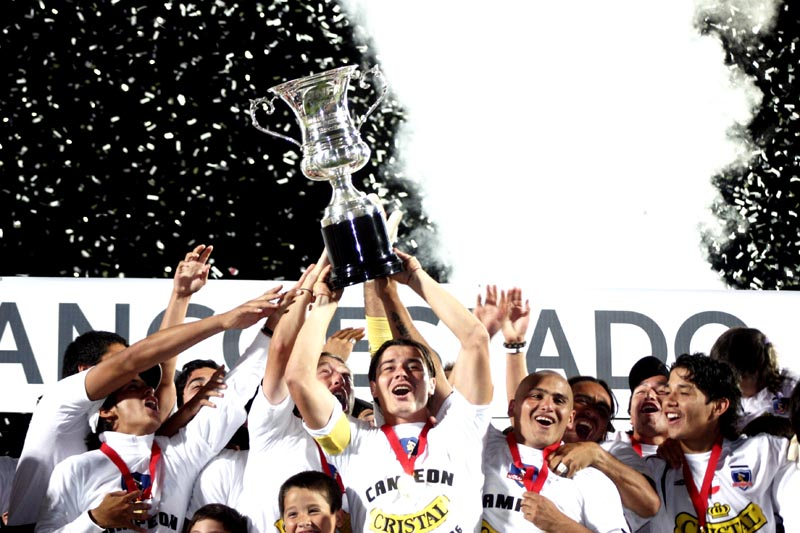
- Season: 2006
- Champions: Colo-Colo; 25th title
- 2007 Copa Libertadores: Colo-Colo; Audax Italiano; Cobreloa
- Matches: 187
- Goals: 547 (2.93 per match)
- Top goalscorer: Leonardo Monje (17 goals)
- Biggest home win: Audax Italiano 5–3 Cobreloa (10 September); Universidad Católica 5–1 Audax Italiano (17 September); Audax Italiano 5–0 Cobresal (23 September); Universidad de Concepción 5–1 Everton (19 November)
- Biggest away win: La Serena 3–6 Cobreloa (6 August); Unión Española 2–6 Universidad de Chile (1 November)
- Highest attendance: 65,000; Colo-Colo 3–2 Audax Italiano (23 December)

The 2006 Torneo Clausura was the season's second tournament. Colo-Colo was the defending champion after beating its rivals Universidad de Chile in the Torneo Apertura final.

=== Qualifications ===
==== Group standings ====
Group A
Pos	Team	Pld	W	D	L	GF	GA	GD	Pts	Qualification
1	Cobreloa	18	11	4	3	40	24	+16	37	Qualify to the playoffs
2	Colo-Colo	18	8	5	5	37	31	+6	29	Qualify to the playoffs
3	Santiago Wanderers	18	8	4	6	22	21	+1	28	Qualify to the repechaje
4	Palestino	18	5	5	8	16	25	−9	20	
5	Cobresal	18	5	3	10	20	28	−8	18	

Group B
Pos	Team	Pld	W	D	L	GF	GA	GD	Pts	Qualification
1	O'Higgins	18	10	5	3	31	20	+11	35	Qualify to the playoffs
2	Coquimbo Unido	18	8	5	5	23	22	+1	29	Qualify to the playoffs
3	Rangers	18	6	6	6	22	24	−2	24	
4	Huachipato	18	6	2	10	29	32	−3	20	
5	Unión Española	18	3	5	10	20	34	−14	14	

Group C
Pos	Team	Pld	W	D	L	GF	GA	GD	Pts	Qualification
1	Deportes Puerto Montt	18	10	3	5	26	21	+5	33	Qualify to the playoffs
2	Audax Italiano	18	9	2	7	32	24	+8	29	Qualify to the playoffs
3	Universidad de Concepción	18	7	4	7	34	30	+4	25	
4	Deportes La Serena	18	4	6	8	32	39	−7	18	
5	Santiago Morning	18	4	5	9	22	32	−10	17	

Group D
Pos	Team	Pld	W	D	L	GF	GA	GD	Pts	Qualification
1	Universidad Católica	18	9	4	5	24	18	+6	31	Qualify to the playoffs
2	Universidad de Chile	18	7	2	9	24	25	−1	23	Qualify to the repechaje
3	Deportes Antofagasta	18	5	6	7	25	25	0	21	
4	Everton	18	5	6	7	23	27	−4	21	

=== Aggregate table ===
Pos	Team	Pld	W	D	L	GF	GA	GD	Pts	Qualification
1	Cobreloa	18	11	4	3	40	24	+16	37	Playoffs
2	O'Higgins	18	10	5	3	31	20	+11	35	Playoffs
3	Deportes Puerto Montt	18	10	3	5	26	21	+5	33	Playoffs
4	Universidad Católica	18	9	4	5	24	18	+6	31	Playoffs
5	Audax Italiano	18	9	2	7	32	24	+8	29	Playoffs
6	Colo-Colo	18	8	5	5	37	31	+6	29	Playoffs
7	Coquimbo Unido	18	8	5	5	23	22	+1	29	Playoffs
8	Santiago Wanderers	18	8	4	6	22	21	+1	28	Repechaje
9	Universidad de Concepción	18	7	4	7	34	30	+4	25	
10	Rangers	18	6	6	6	22	24	−2	24	
11	Universidad de Chile	18	7	2	9	24	25	−1	23	Repechaje
12	Deportes Antofagasta	18	5	6	7	25	25	0	21	
13	Everton	18	5	6	7	23	27	−4	21	
14	Huachipato	18	6	2	10	29	32	−3	20	
15	Palestino	18	5	5	8	16	25	−9	20	
16	La Serena	18	4	6	8	32	39	−7	18	
17	Cobresal	18	5	3	10	20	28	−8	18	
18	Santiago Morning	18	4	5	9	22	32	−10	17	
19	Unión Española	18	3	5	10	20	34	−14	14	

==== Repechaje ====
Match	Home	Visitor	Result
1	Santiago Wanderers	Universidad de Chile	0–1

=== Playoffs ===
Quarterfinals
1	Cobreloa	0	3	3
11	Universidad de Chile	1	1	2
3	Deportes Puerto Montt	0	0	0
6	Colo-Colo	1	4	5
5	Universidad Católica	0	0	0
4	Audax Italiano	1	3	4
2	O'Higgins	0	2	2
7	Coquimbo Unido	0	1	1

Semifinals
1	Cobreloa	0	3	3
6	Colo-Colo	3	3	6
5	Audax Italiano	4	2	6
2	O'Higgins	1	4	5

Finals
6	Colo-Colo	3	3	6
4	Audax Italiano	0	2	2

2006 Clausura winners
Colo-Colo
25th title

=== Relegation table ===
Pos	Team	Pld	W	D	L	GF	GA	GD	Pts	Qualification or relegation
1	Colo-Colo	36	21	6	9	91	53	+38	69	
2	Cobreloa	36	20	7	9	72	48	+24	67	
3	Universidad Católica	36	18	9	9	51	38	+13	63	
4	Audax Italiano	36	18	7	11	64	46	+18	61	
5	Universidad de Concepción	36	16	10	10	65	53	+12	58	
6	Universidad de Chile	36	17	7	12	51	45	+6	58	
7	Huachipato	36	17	5	14	61	51	+10	56	
8	O'Higgins	36	15	11	10	51	45	+6	56	
9	Deportes Puerto Montt	36	14	8	14	59	53	+6	50	
10	Coquimbo Unido	36	11	13	12	39	48	−9	46	
11	Santiago Wanderers	36	13	6	17	38	51	−13	45	
12	Deportes Antofagasta	36	10	12	14	51	56	−5	42	
13	Unión Española	36	11	9	16	44	55	−11	42	
14	Everton	36	10	12	14	43	54	−11	42	
15	Deportes La Serena	36	9	13	14	64	70	−6	40	
16	Cobresal	36	11	7	18	48	60	−12	40	
17	Rangers	36	10	10	16	48	64	−16	40	Promotion Playoffs
18	Palestino	36	9	9	18	38	60	−22	36	Promotion Playoffs
19	Santiago Morning	36	6	11	19	37	63	−26	29	Relegation to Primera B

=== Promotion playoffs ===
Lota Schwager reached its promotion to Primera División after beating Rangers in the 2nd leg match’s penalty shoot-out at Coronel. Whilst Palestino remained in the top level after beating Arturo Fernández Vial 3–1 in Concepción and 1–0 in La Cisterna, Santiago.

Match	Home	Visitor	First leg	Second leg	Agg Result
1	Rangers	Lota Schwager	2–1	1–2 (3–4 p)	3–3
2	Fernández Vial	Palestino	1–3	0–1	1–4

=== Top goalscorers ===
Rank	Player	Club	Goals
1	(Chile) Leonardo Monje	Universidad de Concepción	17
2	(Chile) Humberto Suazo	Colo-Colo	15
2	(Chile) Matías Fernández	Colo-Colo	15
3	(Paraguay) Lucas Barrios	Cobreloa	12
3	(Chile) Carlos Villanueva	Audax Italiano	12
4	(Argentina) José Luis Díaz	Cobreloa	11
4	(Venezuela) Giancarlo Maldonado	O'Higgins	11
4	(Chile) Manuel Neira	Unión Española	11
6	(Chile) Renato Ramos	Deportes Antofagasta	10
2	(Argentina) Matías Urbano	Deportes La Serena	9
2	(Argentina) Rodrigo Mannara	Cobreloa	9
