= Cristián Muñoz (footballer, born 1977) =

Argentine-born Chilean footballer

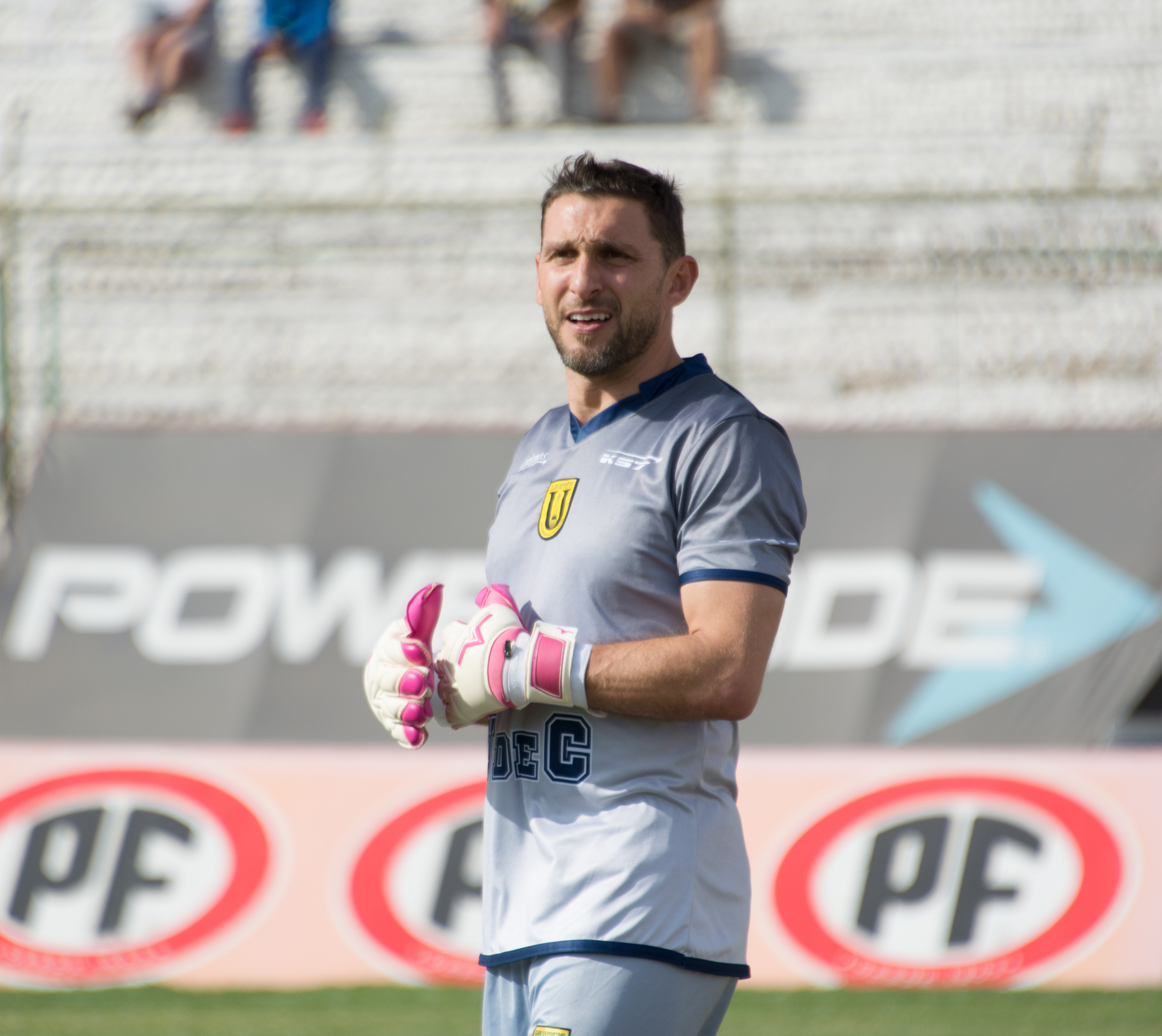
- Muñoz with Universidad de Concepción in May 2018

Personal information
- Full name: Cristián Fernando Muñoz
- Date of birth: 1 July 1977 (age 49)
- Place of birth: Junín, Argentina
- Height: 1.77 m (5 ft 10 in)
- Position: Goalkeeper

Youth career
- Sarmiento

Senior career*
Years	Team	Apps	(Gls)
1994–1997	Sarmiento		
1997–2004	Boca Juniors	6	(0)
2000	→ Los Andes (loan)	10	(0)
2001–2002	→ Talleres (loan)	6	(0)
2005–2007	Huachipato	98	(0)
2007–2009	Colo-Colo	95	(0)
2010–2012	Huachipato	89	(0)
2013–2019	Universidad de Concepción	187	(0)
Total		491	(0)

International career
1997	Argentina U20	1	(0)
- * Club domestic league appearances and goals as of 29 December 2018

Cristián Fernando Muñoz (born 1 July 1977) is an Argentine-born Chilean former professional footballer who played as goalkeeper. He is best known for his spells at Colo-Colo and Huachipato. Muñoz was nicknamed El Tigre (Spanish: the tiger) for his skills.

He was member of the Argentina U20 squad that won the 1997 FIFA World Youth Championship celebrated in Malaysia.

He was the last active footballer to have played professionally alongside Diego Maradona.

== Club career ==
=== Early career ===
Born in Junín, Buenos Aires, Muñoz started his career at his local village team Sarmiento in 1994, moving at the age of 20 to the Argentine giant club, Boca Juniors, after the 1997 FIFA World Youth Championship. He made his competitive debut for Boca against Newell's Old Boys on 14 September of that year (1997). During his stay in the club, he was loaned to teams as Los Andes in 2000 and Talleres de Córdoba in 2001, remaining him in this club until 2002. In the next season, he returned to Boca as substitute of Roberto Abbondanzieri, winning the Copa Libertadores and then the Copa Sudamericana.

After two seasons in Argentina as substitute, in January 2005, Muñoz was signed by the Chilean side Huachipato for play the 2005 Torneo de Apertura. He made his club's competitive debut in a 2–1 league away win over Deportes Temuco on 6 February. The club also impressed finishing in the semi-finals of the league championship playoffs. He made 100 appearances in all competitions in two years. Muñoz played a key role in Huachipato's qualification to the 2007 Copa Sudamericana playoffs after of finish in the fourth position of the Apertura tournament with 40 points behind Audax Italiano with 44 points.

=== Colo-Colo ===
Muñoz was signed by defending Chilean Primera División champions Colo-Colo in July 2007 for an undisclosed fee, with the mission of replace to his countrymen Sebastián Cejas in the goal, who left the club for high costs. In his arrival to the club, he was assigned with the jersey number 1, because the departure of Cejas, who wears this number. He made his unofficial debut for the club in a 1–1 pre-season draw with the club's rival Universidad de Chile for the Copa Gato.

His competitive debut for the club came on 29 July 2007 in the 3–0 away victory against Deportes Concepción. He received more competition when Rainer Wirth broke into the first team during the first games of the 2007 Clausura, and this made a rotation between the keepers, but because to the several errors of Wirth, Muñoz became in the club's first goalkeeper. He played in the Clausura final against Universidad de Concepción in the 3–0 win, being this his first honour for the club, and also the club completed four titles consecutives since 2006 under the coach Claudio Borghi, being an historic record in the Chilean football. In the next season, Muñoz was runner-up of the 2008 Apertura, but champion of the Clausura tournament.

== International career ==
With the Argentina Under-20 team, Muñoz won the 1997 FIFA World Youth Championship in Malaysia, being teammate of players like Juan Román Riquelme, Esteban Cambiasso, Luciano Galletti, Diego Placente, among others. He was substitute of Leo Franco during the tournament and played in the second round against England under-20 team, in a game that finished in a 2–1 win of his country.

== Club statistics ==
Club Performance
Club	Season	League		Copa Chile		Total
Club	Season	App	G.A	App	G.A	App	G.A
Huachipato	Apertura 2005	18	-	-	-	18	-
Huachipato	Clausura 2005	21	-	-	-	21	-
Huachipato	Apertura 2006	22	-	-	-	22	-
Huachipato	Clausura 2006	16	-	-	-	16	-
Huachipato	Apertura 2007	20	-	-	-	20	-
Club Total		97	–	–	–	97	–
Colo-Colo	Clausura 2007	19	-	-	-	19	-
Colo-Colo	Apertura 2008	20	-	-	-	20	-
Colo-Colo	Clausura 2008	24	-	-	-	24	-
Colo-Colo	Apertura 2009	13	-	-	-	13	-
Colo-Colo	Clausura 2009	20	-	-	-	20	-
Club Total		96	–	–	–	96	–
Huachipato	Torneo 2010	34	-	-	-	34	-
Huachipato	Apertura 2011	15	-	-	-	15	-
Huachipato	Clausura 2011	17	-	-	-	17	-
Huachipato	Apertura 2012	16	-	-	-	16	-
Huachipato	Clausura 2012	6	-	3	-	9	-
Club Total		88	–	3	–	91	–
Universidad de Concepción	Primera B 2013	16	-	-	-	16	-
Universidad de Concepción	Apertura 2013	16	-	2	-	18	-
Universidad de Concepción	Clausura 2014	18	-	-	-	18	-
Universidad de Concepción	Apertura 2015	17	-	2	-	19	-
Club Total		67	–	4	–	71	–
Career Total		348	–	7	–	355	–

== Honours ==
Boca Juniors

- Primera División Argentina: 1999 Clausura, 2003 Apertura
- Copa Libertadores: 2001, 2003
- Copa Sudamericana: 2004

Colo-Colo

- Primera División de Chile: 2007-C, 2008-C, 2009-C

Huachipato

- Primera División de Chile: 2012 Clausura

Universidad de Concepción

- Primera B de Chile: 2013 Transición
- Copa Chile: 2014–15

Argentina U-20

- FIFA World Youth Championship: 1997
