= Leonardo Monje =

Chilean footballer (born 1981)

Personal information
- Full name: Leonardo Esteban Monje Valenzuela
- Date of birth: 16 March 1981 (age 45)
- Place of birth: Temuco, Chile
- Height: 1.65 m (5 ft 5 in)
- Position: Forward

Youth career
- Universidad Católica

Senior career*
Years	Team	Apps	(Gls)
2000–2004	Universidad Católica	14	(1)
2001	→ Everton (loan)	15	(5)
2001	→ Santiago Morning (loan)	11	(2)
2002	→ Palestino (loan)	12	(0)
2003	→ Deportes Antofagasta (loan)	11	(0)
2003	→ Audax Italiano (loan)	10	(0)
2004	→ Magallanes (loan)	19	(3)
2005	Palestino	31	(9)
2006	Deportes Puerto Montt	18	(13)
2006–2007	Universidad de Concepción	36	(23)
2007	Deportes Concepción	18	(6)
2008–2009	Huachipato	64	(33)
2010–2011	Unión Española	60	(19)
2012	Rosario Central	17	(1)
2012–2013	Deportes Iquique	23	(1)
2013	Municipal	22	(8)
2013–2014	Universidad de Concepción	28	(6)
2015–2017	Coquimbo Unido	70	(18)
Total		479	(148)

International career
2006–2011	Chile	3	(0)

Managerial career
- 2026: Santiago Morning (assistant)
- * Club domestic league appearances and goals

Leonardo Esteban Monje Valenzuela (born 16 March 1981) is a Chilean former professional footballer who played as a forward.

== Coaching career ==
In March 2026, Monje joined the technical staff of Esteban Paredes in Santiago Morning as assistant coach.

== Personal life ==
His son, Joaquín, is a professional footballer who was with the Unión Española youth ranks and then moved to Coquimbo Unido since his father played at the club.

== Honours ==
Universidad de Concepción

- Copa Chile: 2014–15

Individual

- Primera División de Chile top scorer: 2006 Clausura
