= 2006 Torneo Clausura (Chile) =

Campeonato Nacional Clausura Copa Banco del Estado
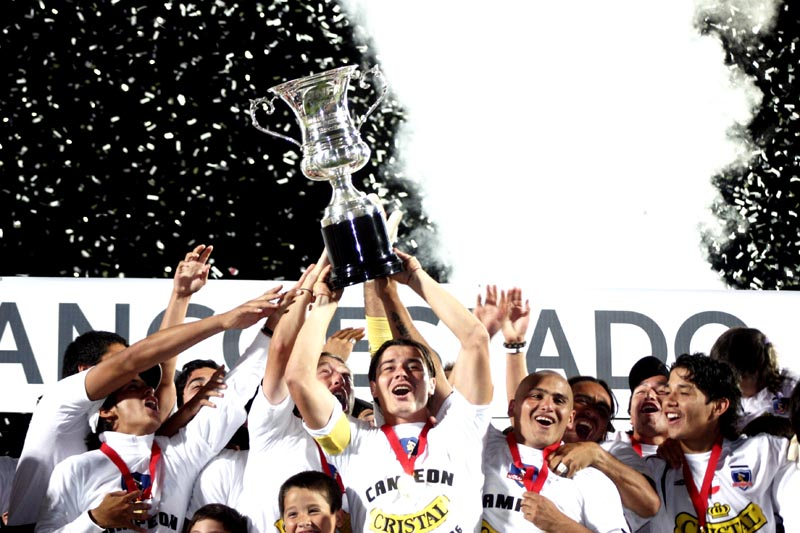
- Season: 2006
- Dates: 15 July – 23 December 2006
- Champions: Colo-Colo; 25th title
- Relegated: Santiago Morning; Rangers (Rel. play-off)
- 2007 Copa Libertadores: Audax Italiano (Clausura runner-up); Cobreloa (Best team not yet qualified)
- Matches played: 186
- Goals scored: 548 (2.95 per match)
- Top goalscorer: Leonardo Monje (17 goals)
- Biggest home win: Audax Italiano 5–0 Cobresal (23 September)
- Biggest away win: U. Española 2–6 U. de Chile (1 November)
- Highest attendance: 60,000; Audax Italiano 2–3 Colo-Colo (23 December)
- Total attendance: 1,090,353
- Average attendance: 5,862

The 2006 Campeonato Nacional Clausura Copa Banco del Estado was the 80th Chilean League top flight, in which Colo-Colo won its 25th league title after beating Audax Italiano in the finals.

== Qualifying stage ==
=== Scores ===
	ANT	AUD	CLO	CSA	COL	COQ	EVE	HUA	LSE	OHI	PAL	PMO	RAN	SMO	UCA	UCH	UCO	UES	SWA
Antofagasta					1–1	0–1	0–0	2–0	3–2			3–1	1–1		1–2		3–2		
Audax	1–1		5–3	5–0		2–0		2–1				1–1	1–0	1–2		0–1			2–0
Cobreloa	3–1			3–1	2–2		3–0	1–1		3–1	1–0			2–1			1–0		3–1
Cobresal	1–0				4–1				1–1	2–1			0–0	3–0	1–2		4–1	2–4	
Colo-Colo		2–3							4–4	4–1	1–3	4–1		2–2		4–2	4–2	1–0	
Coquimbo			1–1	1–0	1–4		0–0		4–3		3–0	0–1							2–0
Everton		4–3		2–0	3–0			1–3	1–1			1–2	3–0	1–1				1–2	
Huachipato				1–1	1–2	0–1			2–0				1–3				2–3	1–0	2–3
La Serena		2–1	3–6							4–4	1–1	0–0	1–2	1–0	2–3	3–0			
O'Higgins	3–1	1–0				3–0	2–0	3–2						4–2		2–0			1–0
Palestino	1–1	0–3		1–0			1–1		2–4	0–0						1–0	2–2	1–0	
Puerto Montt			4–1	2–0				2–1		1–1	2–1				3–1	3–0	1–0	0–1	
Rangers			1–3		0–0	1–2				1–1	3–1	1–2		3–1	1–1		2–1		3–1
S. Morning	1–4					2–2		3–4			0–1	2–0				1–0	1–1		1–1
U. Católica		5–1	1–0		0–1	0–0	2–1	3–1		0–1	1–0			1–0			0–2		
U. Chile	1–0		1–1	2–0		1–2	1–2	0–2					4–0		1–0				2–0
U. Concepción		1–0				3–2	5–1		4–1	0–0						2–2		4–2	1–2
U. Española	3–3	0–1	0–3			1–1			1–3	0–2			0–0	1–2	1–1	2–6			
S. Wanderers	1–0			1–0	1–0		1–1		2–0		2–0	3–0			1–1			2–2	

=== Group standings ===
==== Group A ====
Pos	Team	Pld	W	D	L	GF	GA	GD	Pts	Qualification
1	Cobreloa	18	11	4	3	40	24	+16	37	Qualify to the playoffs
2	Colo-Colo	18	8	5	5	37	31	+6	29	Qualify to the playoffs
3	Santiago Wanderers	18	8	4	6	22	21	+1	28	Qualify to the repechaje
4	Palestino	18	5	5	8	16	25	−9	20	
5	Cobresal	18	5	3	10	20	28	−8	18	

==== Group B ====
Pos	Team	Pld	W	D	L	GF	GA	GD	Pts	Qualification
1	O'Higgins	18	10	5	3	31	20	+11	35	Qualify to the playoffs
2	Coquimbo Unido	18	8	5	5	23	22	+1	29	Qualify to the playoffs
3	Rangers	18	6	6	6	22	24	−2	24	
4	Huachipato	18	6	2	10	29	32	−3	20	
5	Unión Española	18	3	5	10	20	34	−14	14	

==== Group C ====
Pos	Team	Pld	W	D	L	GF	GA	GD	Pts	Qualification
1	Deportes Puerto Montt	18	10	3	5	26	21	+5	33	Qualify to the playoffs
2	Audax Italiano	18	9	2	7	32	24	+8	29	Qualify to the playoffs
3	Universidad de Concepción	18	7	4	7	34	30	+4	25	
4	Deportes La Serena	18	4	6	8	32	39	−7	18	
5	Santiago Morning	18	4	5	9	22	32	−10	17	

==== Group D ====
Pos	Team	Pld	W	D	L	GF	GA	GD	Pts	Qualification
1	Universidad Católica	18	9	4	5	24	18	+6	31	Qualify to the playoffs
2	Universidad de Chile	18	7	2	9	24	25	−1	23	Qualify to the repechaje
3	Deportes Antofagasta	18	5	6	7	25	25	0	21	
4	Everton	18	5	6	7	23	27	−4	21	

=== Aggregate table ===
Pos	Team	Pld	W	D	L	GF	GA	GD	Pts	Qualification
1	Cobreloa	18	11	4	3	40	24	+16	37	Playoffs
2	O'Higgins	18	10	5	3	31	20	+11	35	Playoffs
3	Deportes Puerto Montt	18	10	3	5	26	21	+5	33	Playoffs
4	Universidad Católica	18	9	4	5	24	18	+6	31	Playoffs
5	Audax Italiano	18	9	2	7	32	24	+8	29	Playoffs
6	Colo-Colo	18	8	5	5	37	31	+6	29	Playoffs
7	Coquimbo Unido	18	8	5	5	23	22	+1	29	Playoffs
8	Santiago Wanderers	18	8	4	6	22	21	+1	28	Repechaje
9	Universidad de Concepción	18	7	4	7	34	30	+4	25	
10	Rangers	18	6	6	6	22	24	−2	24	
11	Universidad de Chile	18	7	2	9	24	25	−1	23	Repechaje
12	Deportes Antofagasta	18	5	6	7	25	25	0	21	
13	Everton	18	5	6	7	23	27	−4	21	
14	Huachipato	18	6	2	10	29	32	−3	20	
15	Palestino	18	5	5	8	16	25	−9	20	
16	La Serena	18	4	6	8	32	39	−7	18	
17	Cobresal	18	5	3	10	20	28	−8	18	
18	Santiago Morning	18	4	5	9	22	32	−10	17	
19	Unión Española	18	3	5	10	20	34	−14	14	

==== Repechaje ====
Match	Home	Visitor	Result
1	Santiago Wanderers	Universidad de Chile	0–1

== Playoffs ==
Quarterfinals
1	Cobreloa	0	3	3
11	Universidad de Chile	1	1	2
3	Deportes Puerto Montt	0	0	0
6	Colo-Colo	1	4	5
5	Universidad Católica	0	0	0
4	Audax Italiano	1	3	4
2	O'Higgins	0	2	2
7	Coquimbo Unido	0	1	1

Semifinals
1	Cobreloa	0	3	3
6	Colo-Colo	3	3	6
5	Audax Italiano	4	2	6
2	O'Higgins	1	4	5

Finals
6	Colo-Colo	3	3	6
4	Audax Italiano	0	2	2

2006 Clausura winners
Colo-Colo
25th title

== Relegation table ==
Pos	Team	Pld	W	D	L	GF	GA	GD	Pts	Qualification or relegation
1	Colo-Colo	36	21	6	9	91	53	+38	69	
2	Cobreloa	36	20	7	9	72	48	+24	67	
3	Universidad Católica	36	18	9	9	51	38	+13	63	
4	Audax Italiano	36	18	7	11	64	46	+18	61	
5	Universidad de Concepción	36	16	10	10	65	53	+12	58	
6	Universidad de Chile	36	17	7	12	51	45	+6	58	
7	Huachipato	36	17	5	14	61	51	+10	56	
8	O'Higgins	36	15	11	10	51	45	+6	56	
9	Deportes Puerto Montt	36	14	8	14	59	53	+6	50	
10	Coquimbo Unido	36	11	13	12	39	48	−9	46	
11	Santiago Wanderers	36	13	6	17	38	51	−13	45	
12	Deportes Antofagasta	36	10	12	14	51	56	−5	42	
13	Unión Española	36	11	9	16	44	55	−11	42	
14	Everton	36	10	12	14	43	54	−11	42	
15	Deportes La Serena	36	9	13	14	64	70	−6	40	
16	Cobresal	36	11	7	18	48	60	−12	40	
17	Rangers	36	10	10	16	48	64	−16	40	Promotion Playoffs
18	Palestino	36	9	9	18	38	60	−22	36	Promotion Playoffs
19	Santiago Morning	36	6	11	19	37	63	−26	29	Relegation to Primera B

=== Promotion/relegation playoffs ===
Lota Schwager reached its promotion to Primera División after beating Rangers in the 2nd leg match’s penalty shoot-out at Coronel. Whilst Palestino remained in the top level after beating Arturo Fernández Vial 3–1 in Concepción and 1–0 in La Cisterna, Santiago.

Match	Home	Visitor	First leg	Second leg	Agg Result
1	Rangers	Lota Schwager	2–1	1–2 (3–4 p)	3–3
2	Fernández Vial	Palestino	1–3	0–1	1–4

== Top goalscorers ==
Rank	Player	Club	Goals
1	(Chile) Leonardo Monje	Universidad de Concepción	17
2	(Chile) Humberto Suazo	Colo-Colo	15
2	(Chile) Matías Fernández	Colo-Colo	15
3	(Paraguay) Lucas Barrios	Cobreloa	12
3	(Chile) Carlos Villanueva	Audax Italiano	12
4	(Argentina) José Luis Díaz	Cobreloa	11
4	(Venezuela) Giancarlo Maldonado	O'Higgins	11
4	(Chile) Manuel Neira	Unión Española	11
6	(Chile) Renato Ramos	Deportes Antofagasta	10
2	(Argentina) Matías Urbano	Deportes La Serena	9
2	(Argentina) Rodrigo Mannara	Cobreloa	9
