= 2008 Liga Deportiva Universitaria de Quito season =

LDU Quito
2008 season
- President: Carlos Arroyo
- Manager: Edgardo Bauza
- Serie A: 2nd
- Copa Libertadores: Champion
- Copa Sudamericana: Round of 16
- FIFA Club World Cup: Runner-up
- Top goalscorer: League: Claudio Bieler (13 goals); All: Claudio Bieler (17 goals)
Home colours	Away colours	Third colours

Liga Deportiva Universitaria de Quito's 2008 season is the club's 55th year in professional football, and the 47th in the top level of national football, Ecuador's Serie A.

In the domestic tournament, the club unsuccessfully defended their 2007 title, finishing as the runner-up to Deportivo Quito. The club reached a level of success in international tournaments that no other Ecuadorian club has ever achieved. LDU Quito became the first Ecuadorian club to win an international title by winning their first Copa Libertadores. The win allowed the club to participate in FIFA's annual Club World Cup, which they finished in 2nd place.

2008 marked the last season Argentine manager Edgardo Bauza will remain at the position. He would be replaced by Uruguayan Jorge Fossati, who previously led the team from 2003-2004.

== Club ==
=== Coaching staff ===
Position	Staff
Head coach	(Argentina) Edgardo Bauza
Assistant coach	(Argentina) Jose Daniel Di Leo
Physical trainer	(Argentina) Bruno Militano
Club doctor	(Ecuador) Juan Barriga (Ecuador) Marco Lascano
Physical therapist	(Ecuador) Fernando Iza (Ecuador) Edgar Alvarez

Last updated: December 17, 2008
Source: Plantel 2008

=== Kit ===
Supplier: Umbro
Sponsor(s): Holcim

CS alt.	Club World Cup

== Squad ==
Note: Flags indicate national team as defined under FIFA eligibility rules; some limited exceptions apply. Players may hold more than one non-FIFA nationality.

No.	Pos.	Nation	Player
1	GK	ECU	José Francisco Cevallos
2	DF	ARG	Norberto Araujo
3	DF	ECU	Renán Calle
4	MF	ECU	Paúl Ambrosi
5	MF	ECU	Alfonso Obregón
7	MF	ECU	Luis Bolaños
8	FW	ECU	Patricio Urrutia (captain)
9	FW	ECU	Agustín Delgado
10	MF	ECU	Edder Vaca
11	FW	ECU	Franklin Salas
12	GK	ECU	Carlos Espinoza
13	MF	ECU	Néicer Reasco
14	MF	ECU	Diego Calderón
15	DF	ECU	William Araujo
16	FW	ARG	Claudio Bieler
17	FW	ECU	Christian Suárez

No.	Pos.	Nation	Player
18	DF	ECU	Byron Camacho
19	FW	CHI	Reinaldo Navia
20	MF	ECU	Pedro Larrea
21	MF	ARG	Damián Manso
22	GK	ECU	Alexander Domínguez
23	DF	ECU	Jayro Campos
24	MF	ECU	Gabriel Espinosa
25	GK	ECU	Daniel Viteri
27	FW	ECU	Víctor Estupiñán
50	MF	ECU	Danny Vaca
51	FW	ECU	Jefferson Lara
52	MF	ECU	Israel Chango
53	MF	ECU	Tito Valencia
54	MF	ECU	Carlos Alfredo Delgado
55	FW	ECU	Lenin Ibujes
57	MF	ECU	Efren de la Cruz

=== Transfers ===
Out

- (Ecuador) Andrés Arrunátegui to Independiente del Valle (loan)
- (Ecuador) Arlín Ayoví to Deportivo Cuenca
- (Ecuador) Joffre Guerrón to Getafe CF
- (Ecuador) Christian Lara to Barcelona (loan)
- (Ecuador) Jhonaton Monar to Independiente del Valle (loan)
- (Ecuador) Cristhian Mora to El Nacional (loan)
- (Ecuador) Luis Ortiz to Emelec
- (Ecuador) Luis Preti to Universidad Católica
- (Ecuador) Ángel Pután to LDU Loja (loan)
- (Paraguay) Enrique Vera to Club América

In

- (Argentina) Claudio Bieler from Atlético de Rafaela
- (Ecuador) José Francisco Cevallos from Deportivo Azogues (loan)
- (Ecuador) Iván Kaviedes* from El Nacional (loan from Norte América)
- (Chile) Reinaldo Navia from Racing Club
- (Ecuador) Néicer Reasco from São Paulo
- (Ecuador) Franklin Salas from Red Star Belgrade
- (Ecuador) Christian Suárez from Deportivo Azogues
- (Ecuador) Edder Vaca from Independiente del Valle (loan from Rocafuerte)

(*) Currently suspended.

=== Copa Libertadores squad ===
Note: Flags indicate national team as defined under FIFA eligibility rules; some limited exceptions apply. Players may hold more than one non-FIFA nationality.

No.	Pos.	Nation	Player
1	GK	ECU	José Francisco Cevallos
2	DF	ARG	Norberto Araujo
3	DF	ECU	Renán Calle
4	DF	ECU	Paúl Ambrosi
5	MF	ECU	Alfonso Obregón
6	DF	ECU	Jefferson Lara
7	FW	ECU	Luis Bolaños
8	MF	ECU	Patricio Urrutia (captain)
9	FW	ECU	Agustín Delgado
10	FW	ECU	Víctor Estupiñán
11	FW	ECU	Franklin Salas
12	GK	ECU	Luis Preti
13	MF	ECU	Pedro Larrea
14	MF	ECU	Diego Calderón

No.	Pos.	Nation	Player
15	MF	ECU	William Araujo
16	FW	ARG	Claudio Bieler
17	MF	ECU	Christian Suárez
18	MF	ECU	Byron Camacho
19	FW	ECU	Joffre Guerrón
20	MF	PAR	Enrique Vera
21	MF	ARG	Damián Manso
22	MF	ECU	Edder Vaca
23	DF	ECU	Jayro Campos
24	MF	ECU	Israel Chango
25	GK	ECU	Daniel Viteri
—	MF	ECU	Andrés Arrunátegui
—	FW	ECU	Iván Kaviedes

=== Copa Sudamericana squad ===
Note: Flags indicate national team as defined under FIFA eligibility rules; some limited exceptions apply. Players may hold more than one non-FIFA nationality.

No.	Pos.	Nation	Player
1	GK	ECU	José Francisco Cevallos
2	DF	ECU	Norberto Araujo
3	DF	ECU	Renán Calle
4	MF	ECU	Paúl Ambrosi
5	MF	ECU	Alfonso Obregón
6	DF	ECU	Jefferson Lara
7	MF	ECU	Luis Bolaños
8	MF	ECU	Patricio Urrutia (captain)
9	FW	ECU	Agustín Delgado
10	MF	ECU	Edder Vaca
11	FW	ECU	Franklin Salas
12	MF	ECU	Gabriel Espinosa
13	MF	ECU	Néicer Reasco

No.	Pos.	Nation	Player
14	MF	ECU	Diego Calderón
15	DF	ECU	William Araujo
16	FW	ARG	Claudio Bieler
17	FW	ECU	Christian Suárez
18	MF	ECU	Byron Camacho
19	FW	CHI	Reinaldo Navia
20	MF	ECU	Pedro Larrea
21	MF	ARG	Damián Manso
22	GK	ECU	Alexander Domínguez
23	DF	ECU	Jayro Campos
24	MF	ECU	Israel Chango
25	GK	ECU	Daniel Viteri

=== Club World Cup squad ===
Note: Flags indicate national team as defined under FIFA eligibility rules; some limited exceptions apply. Players may hold more than one non-FIFA nationality.

No.	Pos.	Nation	Player
1	GK	ECU	José Francisco Cevallos
2	DF	ARG	Norberto Araujo
3	DF	ECU	Renán Calle
4	MF	ECU	Paúl Ambrosi
5	MF	ECU	Alfonso Obregón
7	MF	ECU	Luis Bolaños
8	FW	ECU	Patricio Urrutia (captain)
9	FW	ECU	Agustín Delgado
10	MF	ECU	Edder Vaca
11	MF	ECU	Danny Vaca
13	MF	ECU	Néicer Reasco
14	MF	ECU	Diego Calderón

No.	Pos.	Nation	Player
15	DF	ECU	William Araujo
16	FW	ARG	Claudio Bieler
17	FW	ECU	Christian Suárez
19	FW	CHI	Reinaldo Navia
20	MF	ECU	Pedro Larrea
21	MF	ARG	Damián Manso
22	GK	ECU	Alexander Domínguez
23	DF	ECU	Jayro Campos
24	MF	ECU	Gabriel Espinosa
25	GK	ECU	Daniel Viteri
28	MF	ECU	Israel Chango

== Competitions ==
=== Overall ===
Competition	Started round	Final position / round	First match	Last match
Serie A	First Stage	4th	Feb 1	Dec 6
Copa Libertadores	Second Stage	Winner	Feb 20	Jul 2
Copa Sudamericana	First Stage	Round of 16	Aug 14	Oct 1
Club World Cup	Semifinal	Runner-up	Dec 17	Dec 21

=== Serie A ===
2008 was the club's 47th season in the top-flight national tournament.

==== First stage ====
Pos	Team	Pld	W	D	L	GF	GA	GD	Pts	Qualification
1	Deportivo Quito	22	13	6	3	38	17	+21	45	2008 Copa Sudamericana Preliminary Round & Liguilla Final
2	LDU Quito	22	11	5	6	36	22	+14	38	Qualified to the Liguilla Final
3	Deportivo Cuenca	22	10	7	5	26	16	+10	37	Qualified to the Liguilla Final
4	El Nacional	22	10	7	5	21	9	+12	37	Qualified to the Liguilla Final
5	Barcelona	22	9	8	5	34	27	+7	35	

Updated to match(es) played on July 13, 2008. Source: RSSSF
Rules for classification: 1) points; 2) goal difference; 3) number of goals scored.

LDU Quito qualified for the Liguilla Final with 2 bonus points.

==== Second stage ====
For the second stage, LDU Quito was drawn into Group B.

Pos	Team	Pld	W	D	L	GF	GA	GD	Pts	Qualification
1	Macará	10	5	3	2	17	13	+4	18	Qualified to the Liguilla Final
2	LDU Quito	10	4	4	2	12	10	+2	16	
3	Técnico Universitario	10	3	6	1	10	9	+1	15	
4	Universidad Católica	10	3	3	4	14	16	−2	12	
5	Deportivo Cuenca	10	2	4	4	12	13	−1	10	

Updated to match(es) played on September 27, 2008. Source: RSSSF
Rules for classification: 1) points; 2) goal difference; 3) number of goals scored.

==== Aggregate table ====
Pos	Team	Pld	W	D	L	GF	GA	GD	Pts
1	Deportivo Quito	32	18	8	6	53	27	+26	62
2	Barcelona	32	16	9	7	47	31	+16	57
3	LDU Quito	32	15	9	8	48	32	+16	54
4	El Nacional	32	14	8	10	37	32	+5	50
5	Macará	32	13	9	10	35	32	+3	48

Updated to match(es) played on September 27, 2008. Source: RSSSF
Rules for classification: 1) points; 2) goal difference; 3) number of goals scored.

==== Liguilla Final ====
Pos	Team	Pld	W	D	L	GF	GA	GD	Pts	Qualification
1	Deportivo Quito (C)	10	6	2	2	12	5	+7	23 (Note: Points include Bonus Points earned in the previous rounds: Deportivo Quito (3); LDU Quito (2); Barcelona, Deportivo Cuenca, & Macará (1).)	2009 Copa Libertadores Second Stage
2	LDU Quito	10	5	1	4	15	14	+1	18	
3	Deportivo Cuenca	10	4	2	4	10	11	−1	15	2009 Copa Libertadores First Stage
4	El Nacional	10	3	5	2	10	9	+1	14	2009 Copa Libertadores First Stage
5	Barcelona	10	2	6	2	10	11	−1	13	

Updated to match(es) played on December 7, 2008. Source: RSSSF
Rules for classification: 1) points; 2) goal difference; 3) number of goals scored.
(C) Champions

==== Results summary ====
Overall								Home						Away					
Pld	W	D	L	GF	GA	GD	Pts	W	D	L	GF	GA	GD	W	D	L	GF	GA	GD
42	20	10	12	63	46	+17	70	13	5	3	39	20	+19	7	5	9	24	26	−2

=== Copa Libertadores ===
LDU Quito qualified to the 2008 Copa Libertadores as the 2007 Serie A champion. It would be their 13th participation in CONMEBOL's top continental tournament. LDU Quito was drawn into Group 8 with Argentine 2006–07 season 5th place finishers Arsenal de Sarandí, 2007 Copa do Brasil winner Fluminense FC, and Paraguayan Clausura 2007 winner Club Libertad. They were the first team in the tournament to qualify to the knock-out round.

LDU Quito advanced to their first Copa Libertadores finals; they were the second Ecuadorian club to do so (the first being Barcelona). Los Albos won their first Copa Libertadores by penalty shootout after a 5-5 aggregate score at the end of the second leg. Goalkeeper José Francisco Cevallos blocked three penalty kicks to secure the title for his team.

Pos	Team	Pld	W	D	L	GF	GA	GD	Pts
1	(Brazil) Fluminense	6	4	1	1	11	3	+8	13
2	(Ecuador) LDU Quito	6	3	1	2	10	5	+5	10
3	(Argentina) Arsenal	6	3	0	3	6	14	−8	9
4	(Paraguay) Libertad	6	1	0	5	5	10	−5	3

February 20 Second Stage	LDU Quito (Ecuador)	0–0	(Brazil) Fluminense	Quito
19:50 UTC−05:00		(Report)		Stadium: Estadio Casa Blanca; Attendance: 42,144; Referee: Albert Duarte (Colombia)

March 4 Second Stage	LDU Quito (Ecuador)	2–0	(Paraguay) Libertad	Quito
17:20 UTC−05:00	Urrutia 71'; Guerrón 82'	(Report)		Stadium: Estadio Casa Blanca; Attendance: 27,523; Referee: Óscar Ruiz (Colombia)

March 12 Second Stage	Arsenal (Argentina)	0–1	(Ecuador) LDU Quito	Avellaneda
19:10 UTC−03:00		(Report)	Urrutia 79'	Stadium: Estadio Julio Humberto Grondona; Attendance: 1,586; Referee: Carlos Chandía (Chile)

March 26 Second Stage	LDU Quito (Ecuador)	6–1	(Argentina) Arsenal	Quito
17:00 UTC−05:00	Díaz 14' (o.g.); Manso 19'; Bolaños 28', 42'; Bieler 65'; Obregón 90'	(Report)	Leguizamón 4'	Stadium: Estadio Casa Blanca; Attendance: 41,767; Referee: Benito Archundia (Mexico)

April 8 Second Stage	Libertad (Paraguay)	3–1	(Ecuador) LDU Quito	Asunción
21:30 UTC−03:00	López 10'; Olivera 14'; Cuevas 65'	(Report)	Obregón 63'	Stadium: Estadio Defensores del Chaco; Attendance: 2,800; Referee: Jorge Larrionda (Uruguay)

April 17 Second Stage	Fluminense (Brazil)	1–0	(Ecuador) LDU Quito	Rio de Janeiro
19:10 UTC−03:00	Cícero 31'	(Report)		Stadium: Maracanã Stadium; Attendance: 20,669; Referee: Roberto Silvera (Uruguay)

April 29 Round of 16	LDU Quito (Ecuador)	2–0	(Argentina) Estudiantes	Quito
20:30 UTC−05:00	Guerrón 64'; Manso 78'	(Report)		Stadium: Estadio Casa Blanca; Attendance: 17,540; Referee: Leonardo Gaciba (Brazil)

May 6 Round of 16	Estudiantes (Argentina)	2–1	(Ecuador) LDU Quito	La Plata
21:00 UTC−03:00	Alayes 42'; Maggiolo 66'	(Report)	Bolaños 26'	Stadium: Estadio Ciudad de La Plata; Referee: Óscar Ruiz (Colombia)

May 15 Quarterfinals	San Lorenzo (Argentina)	1–1	(Ecuador) LDU Quito	Buenos Aires
19:00 UTC−03:00	González 38'	(Report)	Bieler 35'	Stadium: Estadio Pedro Bidegain; Referee: Carlos Simon (Brazil)

May 22 Quarterfinals	LDU Quito (Ecuador)	1–1 (5–3 p)	(Argentina) San Lorenzo	Quito
17:20 UTC−05:00	Manso 26'	(Report)	Bergessio 47'	Stadium: Estadio Casa Blanca; Referee: Marco Antonio Rodríguez (Mexico)
	Penalties
	Urrutia (penalty scored); Campos (penalty scored); Vaca (penalty scored); Guerrón (penalty scored); Bieler (penalty scored)		(penalty scored) González; (penalty scored) D'Alessandro; (penalty missed) Torres; (penalty scored) Alvarado

May 27 Semifinals	América (Mexico)	1–1	(Ecuador) LDU Quito	Mexico City
20:10 UTC−06:00	Esqueda 72'	(Report)	Bolaños 62'	Stadium: Estadio Azteca; Attendance: 105,000; Referee: Martín Vázquez (Uruguay)

June 3 Semifinals	LDU Quito (Ecuador)	0–0	(Mexico) América	Quito
20:10 UTC−05:00		(Report)		Stadium: Estadio Casa Blanca; Attendance: 58,336; Referee: Pablo Pozo (Chile)

June 25 Finals	LDU Quito (Ecuador)	4–2	(Brazil) Fluminense	Quito
19:50 UTC−05:00	Bieler 2'; Guerrón 29'; Campos 34'; Urrutia 45'	(Report)	Conca 12'; Thiago Neves 52'	Stadium: Estadio Casa Blanca; Attendance: 62,262; Referee: Carlos Chandía (Chile)

July 2 Finals	Fluminense (Brazil)	3–1 (a.e.t.) (1–3 p)	(Ecuador) LDU Quito	Rio de Janeiro
21:50 UTC−03:00	Thiago Neves 12', 28', 56'	(Report)	Bolaños 6'	Stadium: Maracanã Stadium; Attendance: 86,027; Referee: Héctor Baldassi (Argentina)
	Penalties
	Conca (penalty missed); Thiago Neves (penalty missed); Cícero (penalty scored); Washington (penalty missed)		(penalty scored) Urrutia; (penalty missed) Campos; (penalty scored) Salas; (penalty scored) Guerrón

=== Copa Sudamericana ===
LDU Quito participated in their 5th Copa Sudamericana. They qualified by finishing first in the second stage of the 2007 Serie A.

August 14 First Round	LDU Quito (Ecuador)	4–2	(Bolivia) Bolívar	Quito, Ecuador
16:00 UTC−05:00	Manso 10'; Ambrosi 36'; Bolaños 63'; Navia 75'	Report	Valentierra 14'; Ramos 89'	Stadium: Estadio Casa Blanca; Attendance: 6,625; Referee: Víctor Hugo Carrillo (Peru)

September 18 First Round	Bolívar (Bolivia)	2–1	(Ecuador) LDU Quito	La Paz, Bolivia
20:15 UTC−04:00	Ramos 1'; Martínez 5'	Report	Navia 64'	Stadium: Estadio Hernando Siles; Referee: Ricardo Grance (Paraguay)

September 23 Round of 16	Boca Juniors (Argentina)	4–0	(Ecuador) LDU Quito	Buenos Aires, Argentina
19:30 UTC−03:00	Forlín 27'; Espinosa 32' (o.g.); Mouche 50'; Gaitán 83'	Report		Stadium: La Bombonera; Attendance: 11,726; Referee: Rubén Selman (Chile)

October 1 Round of 16	LDU Quito (Ecuador)	1–1	(Argentina) Boca Juniors	Quito, Ecuador
17:30UTC−05:00	Delgado 71'	Report	Dátolo 29' (pen.)	Stadium: Estadio Casa Blanca; Referee: Juan Soto (Venezuela)

=== FIFA Club World Cup ===
LDU Quito was the first Ecuadorian club to participate in the FIFA Club World Cup and the first non-Argentine/Brazilian club from CONMEBOL to participate. As the winner of the Copa Libertadores, they received a bye into the semifinals.

December 17 Semifinals	Pachuca (Mexico)	0–2	(Ecuador) LDU Quito	Tokyo, Japan
19:30 UTC+09:00		Report	Bieler 4'; Bolaños 26'	Stadium: National Stadium; Attendance: 33,366; Referee: Alberto Undiano Mallenco (Spain)

December 21 Final	LDU Quito (Ecuador)	0–1	(England) Manchester United	Yokohama, Japan
19:30 UTC+09:00		Report	Rooney 73'	Stadium: International Stadium; Attendance: 68,682; Referee: Ravshan Irmatov (Uzbekistan)

== Statistics ==
=== Top scorer ===
Season: Claudio Bieler (17 goals)

- Serie A: Claudio Bieler (13 goals)
- International: Luis Bolaños (7 goals)
  - Copa Libertadores: Luis Bolaños (5 goals)
  - Copa Sudamericana: Reinaldo Navia (2 goals)
  - FIFA Club World Cup: Claudio Bieler & Luis Bolaños (1 goal each)
