= 2008 in Ecuadorian football =

Football in Ecuador
- Season: 2008

The 2008 season is the 86th season of competitive football in Ecuador.

== National leagues ==
=== Serie A ===
- Champion: Deportivo Quito (3rd title)
- International cup qualifiers:
  - Copa Libertadores: Deportivo Quito, Deportivo Cuenca, El Nacional
  - Copa Sudamericana: Deportivo Quito
- Relegated: Universidad Católica, Deportivo Azogues

=== Serie B ===
- Winner: Manta (1st title)
- Promoted: Manta, LDU Portoviejo
- Relegated: LDU Cuenca, Brasilia

=== Segunda ===
- Winner: Rocafuerte
- Promoted: Rocafuerte, Atlético Audaz

== Clubs in international competitions ==
Team	2008 Copa Libertadores	2008 Copa Sudamericana	2008 FIFA Club WC
Deportivo Cuenca	Eliminated in the Second Stage	N/A	N/A
Deportivo Quito	N/A	Eliminated in the First Stage	N/A
LDU Quito	Champion	Eliminated in the Round of 16	Runner-up
Olmedo	Eliminated in the First Stage	N/A	N/A

== National team ==
=== Senior team ===
==== 2010 FIFA World Cup qualifiers ====
2008-06-15
18:10 UTC-3

Argentina	1 – 1	Ecuador
Palacio 90+3'	Report	Urrutia 68'

El Monumental, Buenos Aires
Attendance: 41,167
Referee: René Ortubé (Bolivia)

2008-06-18
17:00 UTC-5

Ecuador	0 – 0	Colombia
	Report

Estadio Olímpico Atahualpa, Quito
Attendance: 33,588
Referee: Héctor Baldassi (Argentina)

2008-09-06
16:10 UTC-5

Ecuador	3 – 1	Bolivia
Caicedo 21'; Méndez 51' (pen.); Benítez 72'	Report	Botero 40'

Estadio Olímpico Atahualpa, Quito
Attendance: 35,000
Referee: Pablo Pozo (Chile)

2008-09-10
17:40 UTC-3

Uruguay	0 – 0	Ecuador
	Report

Estadio Centenario, Montevideo
Attendance: 45,000
Referee: Óscar Ruiz (Colombia)

2008-10-12
16:55 UTC-5

Ecuador	1 – 0	Chile
Benítez 71'	Report

Estadio Olímpico Atahualpa, Quito
Attendance: 33,079
Referee: Martin Vásquez (Uruguay)

2008-10-15
20:30 UTC-4:30

Venezuela	3 – 1	Ecuador
Maldonado 48'; Moreno 56'; Arango 67'	Report	Mina 12'

Estadio Olímpico Luis Ramos, Puerto la Cruz
Attendance: 10,581
Referee: Enrique Osses (Chile)

==== Friendlies ====
March 26

Ecuador	3 - 1	Haiti
Castillo 45'; Ayoví 59'; Tenorio 61'		Charles 5'

Estadio La Cocha, Latacunga

May 27

France	2 - 0	Ecuador
Gomis 60', 86'

Stade des Alpes, Grenoble

August 20

Ecuador	1 - 0	Colombia
Benítez 38'

Giants Stadium, East Rutherford, New Jersey

November 12

Ecuador	1 - 2	Mexico
Mina 8'		López 50'; Matías Vuoso 90 + 3'

Chase Field, Phoenix, Arizona

December 17
20:30 (UTC+4)

Iran	0 - 1	Ecuador
	Article	Martínez 56'

Sultan Qaboos Sports Complex, Muscat

December 19

Oman	2 - 0	Ecuador
	Article

Sultan Qaboos Sports Complex, Muscat

=== Women's U-20 team ===
The women's U-20 team participated in the South American Women's U-20 tournament in Brazil. They were drawn into Group A and finished third in the group; they failed to advance.
