= Octavio Zapata =

Colombian footballer (born 1989)

Personal information
- Full name: Octavio Mauricio Zapata Possu
- Date of birth: 14 November 1989 (age 36)
- Place of birth: Bogotá, Colombia
- Height: 1.86 m (6 ft 1 in)
- Position: Center-back

Team information
- Current team: Aragua F.C.
- Number: 2

Senior career*
Years	Team	Apps	(Gls)
2016	Monagas S.C.	15	(0)
2016–2017	Deportivo Lara	22	(0)
2017–2018	Academia Puerto Cabello	13	(0)
2018–2019	Deportivo Anzoátegui	7	(0)
2019–	Aragua F.C.	4	(0)
- * Club domestic league appearances and goals as of 23 March 2019

Octavio Mauricio Zapata Possu (born 14 November 1989) is a Colombian footballer who plays as a defender for Aragua F.C. in the Venezuelan Primera División.
