= 2007–08 Copa Venezuela =

The 2007–08 Copa Venezuela was the 38th staging of the Copa Venezuela.

The competition started on August 29, 2007, and concluded on April 16, 2008, with a two leg final, in which Aragua FC won the trophy for the first time with a 2–2 draw and a 0–0 at home over Unión Atlético Maracaibo.

== First round ==
The matches were played on 29 August 2007.

Team 1	Score	Team 2
Universitario FC	1-2	Atlético PDVSA-Gas FC
Hermandad Gallega	0-1	Centro Ítalo Venezolano FC
Unión Atlético Piar	2–2; 4–3 (pen)	América FC
Orinoco FC	1–3	Minervén Bolívar FC
UCV Aragua	2–3	UCV FC
Deportivo Barinas	0–4	Atlético Turén
Yaracuyanos FC	2–1	Policía de Lara FC
Cenfemaca FC	0–2 (aet)	Unión Atlético Trujillo
Unión Atlético Falcón	0–2	Zulia FC
Unión Liga Municipal	0–3	Baralt FC
UCLA FC	bye	

== Second round ==
One leg - 2A/2B Division Teams v/s 1 Division Teams. The matches were played on 8–9 September 2007.

Team 1	Score	Team 2
UCV FC	0-3	Dvo. Italia FC
UA Piar	0-3	Monagas SC
AC Minerven FC	1-3	AC Mineros de Guayana
Baralt FC	5-2	Unión Lara FC
Zulia FC	1-2	Guaros de Lara FC
UCLA FC	1-2	Carabobo FC
Atl. Turén	2-1 (aet)	Portuguesa FC
Atl. PDVSA-Gas FC	0-5	Dvo. Anzoátegui SC
Yaracuyanos FC	1-2 (aet)	Aragua FC
UA Trujillo	0-3	Trujillanos FC
Centro Ítalo FC	0-0; 4-1 (pen)	Estrella Roja FC

Two legs - 1 Division Teams v/s 1 Division Teams. The matches were played on 9–12 September 2007.

Team 1	Agg.	Team 2	1st leg	2nd leg
Llaneros FC	3-3; 2-4 (pen)	Zamora FC	1-2	2-1
Atl. El Vigía FC	4-1	Estudiantes FC	3-0	1-1
Dvo. Táchira	bye			

== Third round ==
The matches were played on 19–26 September 2007.

Team 1	Agg.	Team 2	1st leg	2nd leg
Dvo. Italia FC	3-4	Monagas SC	3-2	0-2
Dvo. Anzoátegui SC	2-1	AC Mineros de Guayana	2-0	0-1
Baralt FC	1-2	Guaros de Lara FC	1-2	0-0
Carabobo FC	1-3	Caracas FC	1-1	0-2
UA Maracaibo	3-1	Atl. Turén	2-1	1-0
Aragua FC	1-1 (a)	Centro Ítalo FC	0-0	1-1
Trujillanos FC	1-7	Zamora FC	1-3	0-4
Atl. El Vigía FC	4-4 (a)	Dvo. Táchira	1-1	3-3

== Quarterfinals ==
The matches were played on 10–14 October 2007.

Team 1	Agg.	Team 2	1st leg	2nd leg
Dvo. Anzoátegui SC	4-4 (a)	Monagas SC	1-2	3-2
Aragua FC	2-1	Caracas FC	1-1	1-0
Guaros de Lara FC	1-1; 2-4 (pen)	UA Maracaibo	0-1	1-0
Zamora FC	1-6	Atl. El Vigía FC	1-2	0-4

== Semifinals ==
The matches were played on 31 October–18 November 2007 and 5–19 March 2008.

Team 1	Agg.	Team 2	1st leg	2nd leg
Aragua FC	2-2 (a)	Dvo. Anzoátegui SC	0-0	2-2
Atl. El Vigía FC	1-3	UA Maracaibo	1-1	0-2

== Finals ==
The matches were played on 2–16 April 2008.

Team 1	Agg.	Team 2	1st leg	2nd leg
UA Maracaibo	2-2 (a)	Aragua FC	2-2	0-0

Aragua FC winners, qualify to Copa Nissan Suramericana 2008.
