= Rafael Mea Vitali =

Venezuelan footballer (born 1975)

Personal information
- Full name: Rafael Loreto Mea Vitali
- Date of birth: February 17, 1975 (age 51)
- Place of birth: Caracas, Venezuela
- Height: 1.84 m (6 ft 1/2 in)
- Position: Defender

Senior career*
Years	Team	Apps	(Gls)
1993–2000	Caracas FC		
2000	New Jersey Stallions		
2000–2002	Caracas FC		
2002–2003	Waldhof Mannheim		
2003–2004	Caracas FC		
2003–2004	Sportfreunde Siegen		
2004–2006	Caracas FC		
2006–2008	UA Maracaibo		
2008–2009	Estrella Roja		
2008–2009	Mineros de Guayana		
2009–2012	Aragua		
2012–	Atlético Venezuela		

International career
2001–2002	Venezuela	11	(0)
- * Club domestic league appearances and goals as of May 2009

Rafael Loreto Mea Vitali (born 17 February 1975, in Caracas) is a Venezuelan football defender who made a total number of 11 appearances for the Venezuela national team between 2001 and 2002.

== Club career ==
He started his professional career at Caracas FC and actually coaches for CIEX Sports Academy.
