= 2008 Campeonato Ecuatoriano de Fútbol Serie A =

Copa Pílsener Serie A
- Season: 2008
- Champions: Deportivo Quito (3rd title)
- Relegated: Deportivo Azogues; Universidad Católica
- Copa Libertadores: Deportivo Quito; Deportivo Cuenca; El Nacional
- Copa Sudamericana: Deportivo Quito
- Matches played: 122
- Goals scored: 519 (4.25 per match)
- Top goalscorer: Pablo Palacios (20 goals)
- Biggest home win: Deportivo Quito 6−0 Emelec (Sep 21)
- Biggest away win: Universidad Católica 0−6 Deportivo Quito (Mar 2)
- Highest scoring: ESPOLI 6−2 Emelec (Apr 26)
- Longest winning run: 7 matches: Deportivo Quito (May 9−Jun 29)
- Longest unbeaten run: 12 matches: Deportivo Quito (Apr 6−Jun 29)
- Longest losing run: 4 matches: Técnico Universitario (Feb 10−Feb 27); Universidad Católica (Feb 23−Mar 8); Olmedo (May 23−Jun 22)

The 2008 Campeonato Ecuatoriano de Fútbol de la Serie A (known as the 2008 Copa Pílsener Serie A for sponsorship reasons) was the 50th season of the Ecuadorian Serie A, Ecuador's premier football league. The three-stage season ran from February 8 and December 7.

Deportivo Quito became the league champion on December 3 by defeating Macará 2–1 in Latacunga. It is Deportivo Quito's 3rd title, and first in 40 years.

== Format ==
The format for 2008 was new, but similar to the 2007 Serie A. The season was composed of three stages:

The format for the First Stage remained the same. The twelve teams competed against each other in a double round-robin format playing each opponent once at home and once away. The top-four teams at the end of the stage qualified to the Liguilla Final. The top-three teams earned bonus points for the Liguilla Final (3, 2, & 1 point[s] respectively) The top-team of the stage qualified to the last Ecuadorian spot in the 2008 Copa Sudamericana.

The format for the Second Stage changed. The twelve teams were divided into two groups of six, where they played within their groups in a double round-robin tournament. The winner of the each group qualified to the final two spots in the Liguilla Final. If a team who has already qualified for the Liguilla Final manages to qualify again by winning their group, the last spots for the Liguilla Final went to the highest positioned team(s) in the Aggregate Table who have not already qualified. The top-team of each group received one bonus point for the Liguilla Final (if a team who earned bonus points from the First Stage finishes last in their group, they will lose their bonus points for the Liguilla Final). At the end of this stage, the two teams with the fewest points in the aggregate table were relegated to the Serie B for the 2009 season.

The format for the Liguilla Final remained the same. The six qualified team competed in a double round-robin tournament. The winner of this stage was crowned the champion of the Copa Pílsener Serie A. The champion will qualified to the 2009 Copa Libertadores Second Stage, while the runner-up and third-place finisher qualify to the First Stage (this slight change from other years is due to the fact that the defending Copa Libertadores champion is an Ecuadorian team).

== Teams ==
The number of teams for the Serie A expanded this season from 10 to 12. Imbabura was the only team relegated at the end of the 2007 season by accumulating the fewest points in the aggregate table. Universidad Católica, ESPOLI, and Técnico Universitario were promoted as 2007 Serie B winner, runner-up, and third-place finisher, respectively. All the new teams have previously played in the Serie A.

Locations of the 2010 Serie A teams

Team	Home city	Home ground
Barcelona	Guayaquil	Monumental Banco Pichincha
Deportivo Azogues	Azogues	Municipal Jorge Andrade Cantos
Deportivo Cuenca	Cuenca	Alejandro Serrano Aguilar
Deportivo Quito	Quito	Olímpico Atahualpa
El Nacional	Quito	Olímpico Atahualpa
Emelec	Guayaquil	George Capwell
ESPOLI	Quito	La Cocha (in Latacunga)
LDU Quito	Quito	La Casa Blanca
Macará	Ambato	Bellavista
Olmedo	Riobamba	Olímpico de Riobamba
Técnico Universitario	Ambato	Bellavista
Universidad Católica	Quito	Olímpico Atahualpa

== First stage ==
The first stage ran from February 8 to July 13.

=== Standings ===
Pos	Team	Pld	W	D	L	GF	GA	GD	Pts	Qualification
1	Deportivo Quito	22	13	6	3	38	17	+21	45	2008 Copa Sudamericana Preliminary Round & Liguilla Final
2	LDU Quito	22	11	5	6	36	22	+14	38	Qualified to the Liguilla Final
3	Deportivo Cuenca	22	10	7	5	26	16	+10	37	Qualified to the Liguilla Final
4	El Nacional	22	10	7	5	21	9	+12	37	Qualified to the Liguilla Final
5	Barcelona	22	9	8	5	34	27	+7	35	
6	ESPOLI	22	9	4	9	31	29	+2	31	
7	Macará	22	8	6	8	18	19	−1	30	
8	Emelec	22	7	8	7	23	28	−5	29	
9	Técnico Universitario	22	7	2	13	20	40	−20	23	
10	Olmedo	22	3	9	10	15	27	−12	18	
11	Universidad Católica	22	4	6	12	22	38	−16	18	
12	Deportivo Azogues	22	3	8	11	22	31	−9	17	

Updated to match(es) played on July 13, 2008. Source: RSSSF
Rules for classification: 1) points; 2) goal difference; 3) number of goals scored.

=== Results ===
Home \ Away	BAR	AZO	CUE	QUI	NAC	EME	ESP	LDQ	MAC	OLM	TEC	CAT
Barcelona	—	2–0	2–2	2–1	3–1	0–0	1–3	1–1	2–0	3–2	2–0	1–0
Deportivo Azogues	1–1	—	0–1	0–1	1–1	0–0	1–0	2–2	0–0	3–0	5–0	2–4
Deportivo Cuenca	2–2	1–0	—	0–0	1–0	4–0	2–1	2–1	1–1	0–1	2–0	2–1
Deportivo Quito	2–2	3–2	1–1	—	0–0	2–1	3–0	3–2	2–0	1–0	1–0	2–1
El Nacional	3–2	3–2	1–0	2–0	—	3–0	2–0	2–1	0–0	2–1	1–0	1–1
Emelec	1–1	1–1	0–0	1–1	1–0	—	2–0	2–1	3–0	1–1	1–0	2–1
ESPOLI	2–1	0–0	0–1	2–2	3–2	6–2	—	1–2	0–2	2–2	1–3	1–0
LDU Quito	1–0	4–0	1–0	1–0	2–2	2–0	0–1	—	1–1	3–1	3–1	1–1
Macará	1–0	3–0	2–1	1–3	0–0	3–1	0–1	0–1	—	0–0	1–0	1–2
Olmedo	2–2	1–0	0–0	0–1	0–2	0–0	1–1	0–3	0–1	—	0–0	1–1
Técnico Universitario	2–3	1–0	0–2	0–4	3–2	2–1	0–4	2–1	1–0	1–0	—	3–3
Universidad Católica	0–1	2–2	2–1	0–6	0–0	0–3	0–2	0–2	0–1	0–2	3–1	—

Updated to match(es) played on July 13, 2008. Source: RSSSF
Legend: Blue = home team win; Yellow = draw; Red = away team win.

== Second stage ==
The second stage was played between July 19, 2008, and September 27, 2008.

=== Group A ===
==== Standings ====
Pos	Team	Pld	W	D	L	GF	GA	GD	Pts	Qualification
1	Barcelona	10	7	1	2	13	4	+9	22	Qualified to the Liguilla Final
2	Deportivo Quito	10	5	2	3	14	7	+7	17	
3	Olmedo	10	5	2	3	15	9	+6	17	
4	El Nacional	10	4	1	5	7	11	−4	13	
5	Emelec	10	4	1	5	7	15	−8	13	
6	Deportivo Azogues	10	1	1	8	7	17	−10	4	

Updated to match(es) played on September 27, 2008. Source: RSSSF
Rules for classification: 1) points; 2) goal difference; 3) number of goals scored.

==== Results ====
Home \ Away	BAR	AZO	QUI	NAC	EME	OLM
Barcelona	—	2–0	1–0	1–0	0–1	1–0
Deportivo Azogues	1–3	—	0–1	1–1	1–2	0–2
Deportivo Quito	0–0	2–1	—	1–0	6–0	2–2
El Nacional	2–1	1–0	2–1	—	1–0	0–4
Emelec	0–3	0–1	1–0	1–0	—	1–1
Olmedo	0–1	3–2	0–1	1–0	2–1	—

Updated to match(es) played on September 27, 2008. Source: RSSSF
Legend: Blue = home team win; Yellow = draw; Red = away team win.

=== Group B ===
==== Standings ====
Pos	Team	Pld	W	D	L	GF	GA	GD	Pts	Qualification
1	Macará	10	5	3	2	17	13	+4	18	Qualified to the Liguilla Final
2	LDU Quito	10	4	4	2	12	10	+2	16	
3	Técnico Universitario	10	3	6	1	10	9	+1	15	
4	Universidad Católica	10	3	3	4	14	16	−2	12	
5	Deportivo Cuenca	10	2	4	4	12	13	−1	10	
6	ESPOLI	10	2	2	6	7	11	−4	8	

Updated to match(es) played on September 27, 2008. Source: RSSSF
Rules for classification: 1) points; 2) goal difference; 3) number of goals scored.

==== Results ====
Home \ Away	CUE	ESP	LDQ	MAC	TEC	CAT
Deportivo Cuenca	—	1–1	0–0	4–3	2–0	2–2
ESPOLI	0–0	—	0–1	0–1	1–2	0–1
LDU Quito	2–1	2–1	—	2–2	0–0	4–0
Macará	1–0	2–3	2–0	—	1–1	3–2
Técnico Universitario	2–1	1–0	1–1	0–0	—	2–2
Universidad Católica	2–1	0–1	3–0	1–2	1–1	—

Updated to match(es) played on September 27, 2008. Source: RSSSF
Legend: Blue = home team win; Yellow = draw; Red = away team win.

== Aggregate table ==
Pos	Team	Pld	W	D	L	GF	GA	GD	Pts	Relegation
1	Deportivo Quito	32	18	8	6	53	27	+26	62	
2	Barcelona	32	16	9	7	47	31	+16	57	
3	LDU Quito	32	15	9	8	48	32	+16	54	
4	El Nacional	32	14	8	10	37	32	+5	50	
5	Macará	32	13	9	10	35	32	+3	48	
6	Deportivo Cuenca	32	12	11	9	38	29	+9	47	
7	Emelec	32	11	9	12	30	43	−13	42	
8	ESPOLI	32	11	6	15	38	40	−2	39	
9	Técnico Universitario	32	10	8	14	30	49	−19	38	
10	Olmedo	32	8	11	13	30	36	−6	35	
11	Universidad Católica	32	7	9	16	36	54	−18	30	Relegation to Serie B
12	Deportivo Azogues	32	4	9	19	29	48	−19	21	Relegation to Serie B

Updated to match(es) played on September 27, 2008. Source: RSSSF
Rules for classification: 1) points; 2) goal difference; 3) number of goals scored.

== Liguilla Final ==
The Liguilla Final was played between October 19, 2008, and December 7, 2008. The top team qualifies directly to the 2009 Copa Libertadores Second Stage, with the runner-up and third-place finisher qualifying to the First Stage (LDU Quito already has a berth into the Second Stage of the 2009 Copa Libertadores as the defending tournament champion).

Pos	Team	Pld	W	D	L	GF	GA	GD	Pts	Qualification
1	Deportivo Quito (C)	10	6	2	2	12	5	+7	23 (Note: Points include Bonus Points earned in the previous rounds: Deportivo Quito (3); LDU Quito (2); Barcelona, Deportivo Cuenca, & Macará (1).)	2009 Copa Libertadores Second Stage
2	LDU Quito	10	5	1	4	15	14	+1	18	
3	Deportivo Cuenca	10	4	2	4	10	11	−1	15	2009 Copa Libertadores First Stage
4	El Nacional	10	3	5	2	10	9	+1	14	2009 Copa Libertadores First Stage
5	Barcelona	10	2	6	2	10	11	−1	13	
6	Macará	10	0	4	6	12	19	−7	5	

Updated to match(es) played on December 7, 2008. Source: RSSSF
Rules for classification: 1) points; 2) goal difference; 3) number of goals scored.
(C) Champions
Notes:

Home \ Away	BAR	CUE	QUI	NAC	LDQ	MAC
Barcelona	—	1–0	1–1	1–1	2–1	2–2
Deportivo Cuenca	2–0	—	0–1	1–1	0–2	2–2
Deportivo Quito	1–1	0–1	—	1–0	2–0	2–0
El Nacional	0–0	2–0	1–0	—	1–1	2–2
LDU Quito	2–1	1–2	0–2	3–1	—	4–3
Macará	1–1	1–2	1–2	0–1	0–1	—

Updated to match(es) played on December 7, 2008. Source: RSSSF
Legend: Blue = home team win; Yellow = draw; Red = away team win.

Copa Pílsener Serie A
2008 champion
Deportivo Quito
3rd title

== Top-ten goalscorers ==
Pos	Player	Club	Goals
1	(Ecuador) Pablo Palacios	Barcelona	20
2	(Argentina) Martín Mandra	Deportivo Quito	17
3	(Argentina) Claudio Bieler	LDU Quito	13
4	(Colombia) José Herrera	Macará	11
4	(Ecuador) David Quiroz	Barcelona	11
6	(Ecuador) Carlos Quiñónez	El Nacional	10
7	(Ecuador) Ebelio Ordóñez	Deportivo Quito	9
7	(Paraguay) Jorge Torales	Deportivo Cuenca	9
9	(Ecuador) Luis Saritama	Deportivo Qutio	8
10	(Ecuador) Orlindo Ayoví	Deportivo Azogues	7
10	(Ecuador) Walter Calderón	Deportivo Quito	7
10	(Argentina) Germán Castillo	Deportivo Cuenca	7
10	(Ecuador) Ángel Escobar	Macará	7
10	(Argentina) Mauricio Ferradas	Deportivo Cuenca	7
10	(Ecuador) Edder Vaca	LDU Quito	7

Last updated: December 6, 2008

== See also ==
- Serie A de Ecuador
- 2008 Copa Libertadores
- 2008 Copa Sudamericana
- 2008 in Ecuadorian football
- Federación Ecuatoriana de Fútbol
