= Isaac Mina =

Ecuadorian footballer (born 1980)

Personal information
- Full name: Isaac Bryan Mina Arboleda
- Date of birth: October 17, 1980 (age 46)
- Place of birth: Esmeraldas, Ecuador
- Height: 1.85 m (6 ft 1 in)
- Positions: Centre-back; leftback

Team information
- Current team: Clan Juvenil

Senior career*
Years	Team	Apps	(Gls)
2002	Esmeraldas Petrolero	0	(0)
2003–2006	Espoli	44	(3)
2006	Deportivo Azogues	9	(0)
2007	Barcelona SC	20	(0)
2008–2014	Deportivo Quito	124	(11)
2015	Mushuc Runa	12	(0)
2016–2017	Aucas	22	(2)
2017–	Clan Juvenil	0	(0)

International career^{‡}
2008–2011	Ecuador	20	(2)
- * Club domestic league appearances and goals as of 24 May 2008 ‡ National team caps and goals as of 28 May 2011

Isaac Bryan Mina Arboleda (born 17 October 1980) is an Ecuadorian footballer who plays club football for Clan Juvenil of Ecuador.

== Club career ==
Mina broke in as a youth in his hometown club, Esmeraldas Petrolero. However, he opted for a team of higher calibre in Club Deportivo ESPOLI of Quito. In 2006, Mina played for Deportivo Azogues, where he impressed with his display of power in the air. After a short and unsuccessful spell in Barcelona SC in 2007, he returned to Quito with Deportivo Quito, where he got his chance of starting and making the national team.

=== Transfer Rumors ===
In July 2008, it was rumoured that Chievo Verona of the Italian Serie A was interested in making a move for him.

In December 2008, it was said that River Plate was interested in acquiring Mina's services.

== International career ==
Mina was first called up for a friendly against Haiti in spring of 2008, beating them 3–1. He then made an appearance for the Ecuador national team in an important friendly against world powers France. Despite going down 2–0 against them, Mina impressed with his defensive ability and might. He was successful in keeping Lionel Messi scoreless during the 2010 FIFA World Cup qualifier against Argentina, eventually drawing 1–1 in Buenos Aires. He also featured in the 0–0 draw with Colombia in Quito. Mina is now seen as Ecuador's starting leftback.

== Honors ==
Deportivo Quito

- Serie A: 2008, 2009, 2011
