= Mauricio Ferradas =

Argentine footballer

Personal information
- Full name: Mauricio Javier Ferradas
- Date of birth: 5 November 1979 (age 46)
- Place of birth: Junín, Argentina
- Height: 1.71 m (5 ft 7 in)
- Position: Second striker

Senior career*
Years	Team	Apps	(Gls)
1997–1999	Sarmiento		
1999–2000	Almagro		
2000–2006	Sarmiento		
2006–2007	Platense		
2007	Racing Club	0	(0)
2008	Deportivo Cuenca	25	(11)
2008–2009	Gimnasia y Esgrima de Jujuy	20	(2)
2009–2013	Independiente Rivadavia	148	(29)
2013–20??	Sarmiento	24	(4)
- * Club domestic league appearances and goals

Mauricio Javier Ferradas (born 5 November 1979) is an Argentine footballer.

== Club career ==
Ferradas previously played for Deportivo Cuenca in Serie A de Ecuador.
