= Byron Camacho =

Ecuadorian footballer (born 1988)

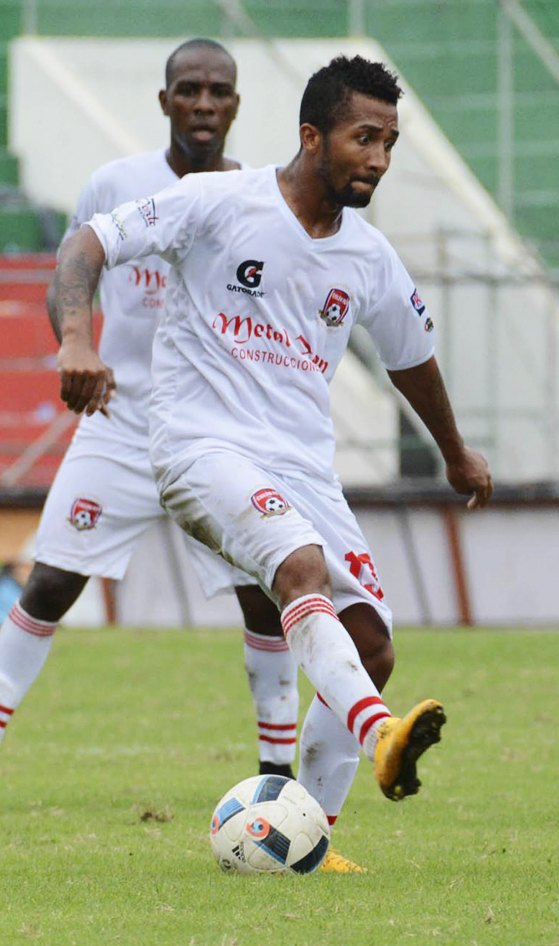
- Byron Camacho in 2016.

Personal information
- Full name: Byron Darwin Camacho Bautista
- Date of birth: May 24, 1988 (age 38)
- Place of birth: Quinindé, Ecuador
- Position: Midfielder

Team information
- Current team: Manta
- Number: 6

Youth career
- 2003–2009: LDU Quito

Senior career*
Years	Team	Apps	(Gls)
2007–2009	LDU Quito	9	(0)
2009	Aucas	1	(0)
2010	UT Cotopaxi	18	(0)
2011–2012	Técnico Universitario	65	(2)
2013	Mushuc Runa	24	(0)
2014	LDU Portoviejo	13	(0)
2015	River Plate Ecuador	28	(0)
2016	Colón	29	(0)
2017–	Manta	10	(0)
- * Club domestic league appearances and goals as of August 12, 2017

Byron Darwin Camacho Bautista (born May 24, 1988) is an Ecuadorian footballer currently playing for River Ecuador. He is a midfielder who was part of the squad who won the 2008 Copa Libertadores with LDU Quito.
