= Danny Vaca =

Ecuadorian footballer (born 1990)

Personal information
- Full name: Danny Josue Vaca Figueroa
- Date of birth: May 12, 1990 (age 36)
- Place of birth: Quito, Ecuador
- Height: 1.76 m (5 ft 9 in)
- Position: Forward

Team information
- Current team: JIT

Youth career
- 2004–2009: LDU Quito

Senior career*
Years	Team	Apps	(Gls)
2007–2011	LDU Quito	28	(1)
2010	→ UT Equinoccial (loan)	39	(8)
2011	→ Universidad Católica (loan)	4	(0)
2012	UT Equinoccial	20	(8)
2012	Grecia	16	(2)
2013	Aucas	22	(0)
2014–2016	Patria	29	(16)
2017–	JIT	16	(3)
- * Club domestic league appearances and goals as of July 15, 2017

Danny Josue Vaca Figueroa (born 12 May 1990, in Quito) is an Ecuadorian footballer who plays for JIT.

Vaca played for LDU Quito in the 2008 FIFA Club World Cup.
