= Jefferson Lara =

Ecuadorian footballer (born 1990)

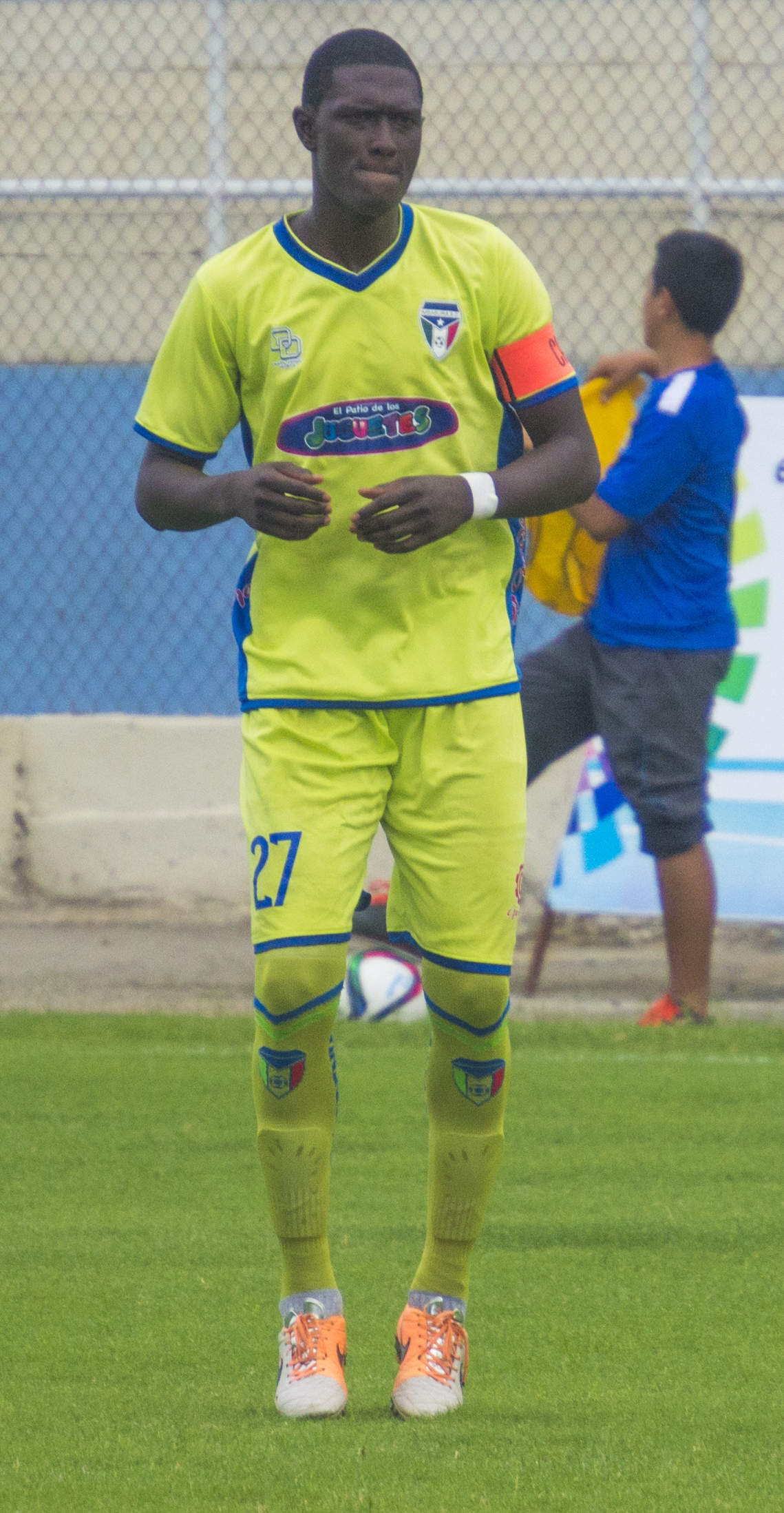

Personal information
- Full name: Jefferson Darío Lara Acosta
- Date of birth: February 20, 1990 (age 36)
- Place of birth: Ibarra, Ecuador
- Height: 1.86 m (6 ft 1 in)
- Position: Defender

Team information
- Current team: Anaconda FC

Youth career
- 2005–2009: LDU Quito

Senior career*
Years	Team	Apps	(Gls)
2007–2010	LDU Quito	17	(0)
2010	→ UT Cotopaxi (loan)	12	(0)
2011	Aucas	9	(1)
2012	Valle del Chota	32	(0)
2013	Deportivo Azogues	36	(2)
2014–2015	Imbabura	71	(3)
2016	Delfín	2	(0)
2016–2018	Manta	43	(3)
2018	Clan Juvenil	12	(0)
2019–	Anaconda FC	2	(1)
- * Club domestic league appearances and goals as of 13:37, 20 June 2019 (UTC)

Jefferson Darío Lara Acosta (born February 20, 1990, in Ibarra) is an Ecuadorian football defender playing for Anaconda FC.

== Club career ==
A product of LDU Quito's youth system, he played at both the senior and youth levels of the club. He became part of the senior squad in 2007, but didn't earn his first senior cap until 2008. In 2010, he was loaned to Serie B squad UT Cotapaxi to gain professional experience.

== Honors ==
LDU Quito

- Copa Libertadores: 2008
- Recopa Sudamericana: 2009
- Copa Sudamericana: 2009
