= Davidson Charles =

Haitian footballer (born 1983)

Personal information
- Full name: Davidson Charles
- Date of birth: 28 March 1983 (age 43)
- Place of birth: Cabaret, Haiti
- Height: 1.80 m (5 ft 11 in)
- Position: Striker

Senior career*
Years	Team	Apps	(Gls)
2002–2003	Racing CF	2	(0)
2003–2004	ASA Issy	18	(4)
2004–2005	Levallois SC	1	(0)
2005–2007	Red Star	26	(5)
2007–2008	L'Entente SSG	20	(4)
2008–2009	Épinal	2	(0)
2009–2010	Safa		(7)
2010–2011	SO Châtellerault	6	(2)
2011–2012	Limoges FC		
2013–2016	Petit-Goâve FC		
2016	Roulado		

International career
2008–2009	Haiti	9	(1)
- * Club domestic league appearances and goals

Davidson Charles (born 28 March 1983) is a Haitian former professional footballer who played as a striker.

== Club career ==
Charles was born in Cabaret, Haiti. He played for different teams in the lower French divisions before moving to L'Entente SSG in summer 2007.

== International career ==
He made his debut for Haiti in the February 2008 friendly series against Venezuela, which served as a warm-up for the 2010 FIFA World Cup qualification match against Nicaragua or the Netherlands Antilles.
