= 2008 Copa Sudamericana =

2008 Copa Nissan Sudamericana de Clubes 2008 Copa Nissan Sul-americana do Clubes

Tournament details
- Dates: July 30 - December 3
- Teams: 34 (from 12 associations)

Final positions
- Champions: (Brazil) Internacional (1st title)
- Runners-up: (Argentina) Estudiantes

Tournament statistics
- Matches played: 66
- Goals scored: 181 (2.74 per match)
- Top scorer(s): (Brazil) Alex (Brazil) Nilmar (5 goals each)
- All statistics correct as of December 3, 2008.

The 2008 Copa Sudamericana de Clubes was the seventh edition of the Copa Sudamericana football tournament. The draw for the tournament took place on June 10, 2008 in Buenos Aires and the competition was played between July 30 and December 3. Arsenal de Sarandí were the defending champions, having won the trophy the previous season. Brazilian side Internacional won the 2008 tournament, becoming the first Brazilian winners of the trophy.

== Qualified teams ==
A total of 34 teams are participating in the 2008 Copa Sudamericana, from 12 associations (10 from CONMEBOL and 2 from CONCACAF).

Association	Team	Qualify method
(Argentina) Argentina 6 + 1 berths	Arsenal	2007 Copa Sudamericana champion
(Argentina) Argentina 6 + 1 berths	Boca Juniors	Invitee
(Argentina) Argentina 6 + 1 berths	River Plate	Invitee
(Argentina) Argentina 6 + 1 berths	Estudiantes	2007–08 Primera División 2nd place
(Argentina) Argentina 6 + 1 berths	San Lorenzo	2007–08 Primera División 4th place
(Argentina) Argentina 6 + 1 berths	Argentinos Juniors	2007–08 Primera División 5th place
(Argentina) Argentina 6 + 1 berths	Independiente	2007–08 Primera División 6th place
(Bolivia) Bolivia 2 berths	Bolívar	2007 Apertura & Clausura Runners-up Playoff runner-up
(Bolivia) Bolivia 2 berths	Blooming	2007 Apertura & Clausura 3rd place Playoff winners
(Brazil) Brazil 8 berths	São Paulo	2007 Série A champion
(Brazil) Brazil 8 berths	Grêmio	2007 Série A 6th place
(Brazil) Brazil 8 berths	Palmeiras	2007 Série A 7th place
(Brazil) Brazil 8 berths	Atlético Mineiro	2007 Série A 8th place
(Brazil) Brazil 8 berths	Botafogo	2007 Série A 9th place
(Brazil) Brazil 8 berths	Vasco da Gama	2007 Série A 10th place
(Brazil) Brazil 8 berths	Internacional	2007 Série A 11th place
(Brazil) Brazil 8 berths	Atlético Paranaense	2007 Série A 12th place
(Chile) Chile 2 berths	Ñublense	2008 Apertura league stage 1st place
(Chile) Chile 2 berths	Universidad Católica	2008 Apertura league stage 2nd place
(Colombia) Colombia 2 berths	Deportivo Cali	2007 Reclasificación 4th place
(Colombia) Colombia 2 berths	América de Cali	2007 Reclasificación 5th place
(Ecuador) Ecuador 2 berths	LDU Quito	2007 Serie A Second Stage winner
(Ecuador) Ecuador 2 berths	Deportivo Quito	2008 Serie A First Stage winner
(Paraguay) Paraguay 2 berths	Libertad	2007 Primera División champion
(Paraguay) Paraguay 2 berths	Olimpia	2007 Primera División 2nd best-placed non-champion
(Peru) Peru 2 berths	Sport Áncash	2007 Descentralizado 2nd best-placed non-champion
(Peru) Peru 2 berths	Universitario	2007 Descentralizado 3rd best-placed non-champion
(Uruguay) Uruguay 2 berths	Defensor Sporting	2007–08 Uruguayan Primera División champion
(Uruguay) Uruguay 2 berths	River Plate	2008 Liguilla 4th place
(Venezuela) Venezuela 2 berths	Aragua	2007–08 Copa Venezuela champion
(Venezuela) Venezuela 2 berths	Maracaibo	2007–08 Primera División 2nd best-placed non-finalist
(Mexico) Mexico 2 berths	Guadalajara	Best-placed eligible team in 2008 Clausura
(Mexico) Mexico 2 berths	San Luis	2nd best-placed eligible team in 2008 Clausura
(Honduras) Honduras 1 berth	Motagua	Invitee

== Preliminary stage ==
The Preliminary Stage opened the Copa Sudamericana. All the second berths of 8 South American football associations contested this round. The four winners advanced to the First Round. Team #1 played at home first.

Team 1	Agg.	Team 2	1st leg	2nd leg
River Plate (Uruguay)	2–4	(Chile) Universidad Católica	2–0	0–4
Maracaibo (Venezuela)	2–4	(Colombia) América de Cali	0–0	2–4
Universitario (Peru)	1–2	(Ecuador) Deportivo Quito	0–0	1–2
Olimpia (Paraguay)	4–3	(Bolivia) Blooming	4–2	0–1

== First stage ==
The First Stage consisted of twenty-eight teams each playing two-legged matches. Twenty-four teams qualified directly to this round. The fourteen winners advanced to the Round of 16. Team #1 played at home first.

Team 1	Agg.	Team 2	1st leg	2nd leg
Defensor Sporting (Uruguay)	5–4	(Paraguay) Libertad	2–1	3–3
LDU Quito (Ecuador)	5–4	(Bolivia) Bolívar	4–2	1–2
América de Cali (Colombia)	2–1	(Colombia) Deportivo Cali	2–0	0–1
Ñublense (Chile)	1–4	(Peru) Sport Áncash	1–0	0–4
Universidad Católica (Chile)	6–2	(Paraguay) Olimpia	4–0	2–2
Aragua (Venezuela)	2–3	(Mexico) Guadalajara	1–2	1–1
San Luis (Mexico)	5–4	(Ecuador) Deportivo Quito	3–1	2–3
Arsenal (Argentina)	6–1	(Honduras) Motagua	4–0	2–1
Independiente (Argentina)	3–3 (3–5 p)	(Argentina) Estudiantes	2–1	1–2
Argentinos Juniors (Argentina)	2–0	(Argentina) San Lorenzo	0–0	2–0
Atlético Paranaense (Brazil)	0–0 (4–3 p)	(Brazil) São Paulo	0–0	0–0
Internacional (Brazil)	3–3 (a)	(Brazil) Grêmio	1–1	2–2
Vasco da Gama (Brazil)	3–4	(Brazil) Palmeiras	3–1	0–3
Botafogo (Brazil)	8–3	(Brazil) Atlético Mineiro	3–1	5–2

== Knockout stages ==
Round of 16
(Ecuador) LDU Quito	0	1	1
(Argentina) Boca Juniors *	4	1	5
(Chile) Universidad Católica *	1	0	1
(Brazil) Internacional (a)	1	0	1
(Mexico) Guadalajara *	2	4	6
(Brazil) Atlético Paranaense	2	3	5
(Uruguay) Defensor Sporting *	1	1	2
(Argentina) River Plate	2	2	4
(Colombia) América de Cali *	1	1	2
(Brazil) Botafogo	0	3	3
(Argentina) Arsenal	1	0	1
(Argentina) Estudiantes *	2	0	2
(Mexico) San Luis *	2	0	2
(Argentina) Argentinos Juniors	1	2	3
(Peru) Sport Áncash *	0	0	0
(Brazil) Palmeiras	0	1	1

Quarterfinals
(Argentina) Boca Juniors	0	1	1
(Brazil) Internacional *	2	2	4
(Mexico) Guadalajara	2	2	4
(Argentina) River Plate *	1	2	3
(Brazil) Botafogo	0	2	2
(Argentina) Estudiantes *	2	2	4
(Argentina) Argentinos Juniors	1	2	3
(Brazil) Palmeiras *	0	0	0

Semifinals
(Brazil) Internacional	2	4	6
(Mexico) Guadalajara *	0	0	0
(Argentina) Estudiantes	1	1	2
(Argentina) Argentinos Juniors *	1	0	1

Finals
(Brazil) Internacional	1	1	2
(Argentina) Estudiantes *	0	1	1

(*)Indicates that the team plays at home for the first leg

=== Round of 16 ===
The Second Stage was the Round of 16, played by the fourteen winners from the First Round, plus River Plate and Boca Juniors. As in the First Round, these teams played two-legged matches. Team #1 played at home first.

Team 1	Agg.	Team 2	1st leg	2nd leg
Boca Juniors (Argentina)	5–1	(Ecuador) LDU Quito	4–0	1–1
América de Cali (Colombia)	2–3	(Brazil) Botafogo	1–0	1–3
San Luis (Mexico)	2–3	(Argentina) Argentinos Juniors	2–1	0–2
Guadalajara (Mexico)	6–5	(Brazil) Atlético Paranaense	2–2	4–3
Defensor Sporting (Uruguay)	2–4	(Argentina) River Plate	1–2	1–2
Sport Áncash (Peru)	0–1	(Brazil) Palmeiras	0–0	0–1
Estudiantes (Argentina)	2–1	(Argentina) Arsenal	2–1	0–0
Universidad Católica (Chile)	1–1(a)	(Brazil) Internacional	1–1	0–0

=== Quarterfinals ===
The Quarterfinals was played by the eight winners from the Round of 16. As in the First Round, these teams played two-legged matches. Team #1 played at home first.

Team 1	Agg.	Team 2	1st leg	2nd leg
Internacional (Brazil)	4–1	(Argentina) Boca Juniors	2–0	2–1
Estudiantes (Argentina)	4–2	(Brazil) Botafogo	2–0	2–2
Palmeiras (Brazil)	0–3	(Argentina) Argentinos Juniors	0–1	0–2
River Plate (Argentina)	3–4	(Mexico) Guadalajara	1–2	2–2

=== Semifinals ===
The Semifinals was played by the four winners from the Quarterfinals. As in the First Round, these teams played two-legged matches. Team #1 played at home first.

Team 1	Agg.	Team 2	1st leg	2nd leg
Guadalajara (Mexico)	0–6	(Brazil) Internacional	0–2	0–4
Argentinos Juniors (Argentina)	1–2	(Argentina) Estudiantes	1–1	0–1

=== Finals ===
The Finals were played by the two winners from the Semifinals. As in the First Round, these teams played two-legged matches. Team #1 played at home first.

Team 1	Agg.	Team 2	1st leg	2nd leg
Estudiantes (Argentina)	1–2	(Brazil) Internacional	0–1	1–1 (aet).

== Champion ==
Copa Sudamericana
2008 Winner

Internacional
1st Title
